= 2002 Louisville Cardinals football team =

American college football season

2002 Louisville Cardinals football

GMAC Bowl, L 15–38 vs. Marshall
- Conference: Conference USA
- Record: 7–6 (5–3 C-USA)
- Head coach: John L. Smith (5th season)
- Offensive coordinator: John Pettas (1st season)
- Offensive scheme: Spread
- Defensive coordinator: Chris Smeland (5th season)
- Base defense: 4–3
- Home stadium: Papa John's Cardinal Stadium

2002 Conference USA football standings
	Conf.			Overall
Team	W		L	W		L
Cincinnati +	6	–	2	7	–	7
No. 23 TCU +	6	–	2	10	–	2
Louisville	5	–	3	7	–	6
Southern Miss	5	–	3	7	–	6
Tulane	4	–	4	8	–	5
UAB	4	–	4	5	–	7
East Carolina	4	–	4	4	–	8
Houston	3	–	5	5	–	7
Memphis	2	–	6	3	–	9
Army	1	–	7	1	–	11
+ – Conference co-champions; Rankings from AP Poll

The 2002 Louisville Cardinals football team represented the University of Louisville in the 2002 NCAA Division I-A football season. The team, led by John L. Smith and played their home games in Papa John's Cardinal Stadium.

== Schedule ==
Date	Time	Opponent	Rank	Site	TV	Result	Attendance	Source
September 1	6:00 pm	Kentucky*	No. 17	Papa John's Cardinal Stadium; Louisville, KY (Governor's Cup)	ESPN2	L 17–22	42,660	
September 7	7:00 pm	at Duke*		Wallace Wade Stadium; Durham, NC	WDRB	W 40–3	25,486	
September 14	9:30 pm	at No. 24 Colorado State*		Hughes Stadium; Fort Collins, CO	ESPN2	L 33–36	31,607	
September 21	1:00 pm	at Army		Michie Stadium; West Point, NY	WDRB	W 45–14	28,625	
September 26	7:30 pm	No. 4 Florida State*		Papa John's Cardinal Stadium; Louisville, KY	ESPN	W 26–20 ^{OT}	38,109	
October 8	8:00 pm	at Memphis		Liberty Bowl Memorial Stadium; Memphis, TN (rivalry)	ESPN2	W 38–32	44,081	
October 19	2:00 pm	TCU^{†}		Papa John's Cardinal Stadium; Louisville, KY		L 31–45	34,127	
October 26	2:00 pm	East Carolina		Papa John's Cardinal Stadium; Louisville, KY		W 44–20	32,428	
November 7	7:30 pm	Cincinnati		Papa John's Cardinal Stadium; Louisville, KY (The Keg of Nails)	ESPN	L 14–24	36,253	
November 14	7:30 pm	at Southern Miss		M. M. Roberts Stadium; Hattiesburg, MS	ESPN	W 20–17 ^{OT}	28,076	
November 23	1:00 pm	UAB		Papa John's Cardinal Stadium; Louisville, KY		W 41–21	35,261	
November 30	3:00 pm	at Houston		Robertson Stadium; Houston, TX	WDRB	L 10–27	11,048	
December 18	8:00 pm	vs. No. 24 Marshall*		Ladd–Peebles Stadium; Mobile, AL (GMAC Bowl)	ESPN2	L 15–38	40,646	
*Non-conference game; ^{†}Homecoming; Rankings from AP Poll released prior to the game; All times are in Eastern time

== Roster ==
2002 Louisville Cardinals football team roster
Players
Coaches
Offense

Pos.	#	Name	Class
QB	8	Gerry Ahrens	Jr
RB	23	Lionel Gates	So
TE	86	Ronnie Ghent	Sr
WR	88	Victor Glenn	Jr
WR	2	Tiger Jones	So
QB	17	Stefan LeFors	So
C	68	Dan Koons	Jr
QB	7	Justin Rascati	Fr
TE	89	Richard Owens	Jr
RB	28	T. J. Patterson	So
OL	70	Will Rabatin	So
QB	15	Dave Ragone	Sr
WR	82	J. R. Russell	So
RB	32	Eric Shelton	So
G	59	Jason Spitz	Fr

Defense

Pos.	#	Name	Class
LB	35	Michael Brown	Sr
S	12	Curry Burns	Sr
DE	58	Elvis Dumervil	Fr
CB	24	Anthony Floyd	Sr
DB	42	Laroni Gallishaw	So
LB	97	Brandon Johnson	Fr
CB	3	Chris Johnson	Sr
LB	98	Chad Lee	Sr
LB	54	Robert McCune	So
S	1	Kerry Rhodes	So
DT	92	Montavious Stanley	Fr
DE	99	Dewayne White	Sr

Special teams

Pos.	#	Name	Class
K	14	Nate Smith	Jr

Head coach

- John L. Smith

Coordinators/assistant coaches

- Mike Cox (LB)

Legend

- (C) Team captain
- (S) Suspended
- (I) Ineligible
- Injured
- Redshirt

Roster
Last update: 2002-10-16

== Team players in the NFL ==
Player	Position	Round	Pick	NFL club
Dewayne White	Defensive end	2	64	Tampa Bay Buccaneers
Dave Ragone	Quarterback	3	88	Houston Texans
Curry Burns	Safety	7	217	Houston Texans
Chris Johnson	Cornerback	7	245	Green Bay Packers
