= Mike Cox (American football coach) =

American football player and coach (born 1965)

Biographical details
- Born: March 12, 1965 (age 61); Coeur d’Alene, Idaho, U.S.

Playing career
- 1983–1986: Idaho
- Position: Linebacker

Coaching career (HC unless noted)
- 1987–1994: Idaho (LB)
- 1995–1997: Utah State (LB)
- 1998–2002: Louisville (LB)
- 2003–2006: Michigan State (LB)
- 2007–2008: St. Louis Rams (defensive assistant)
- 2009–2011: Washington (LB)
- 2012–2016: Kansas State (LB)
- 2018–2020: UTEP (DC/LB)

Michael Douglas Cox (born March 12, 1965) is an American football coach and former player. He was most recently the defensive coordinator at the University of Texas at El Paso. He played collegiately at the University of Idaho.

== Playing career ==
Cox played linebacker for Idaho from 1983 through 1986, while working on his degree in general studies. He was a four-time letter-winner, and a three-year starter, while playing for Head Coaches Dennis Erickson and Keith Gilbertson. His 252 tackles still ranks among the school's all-time leaders. Cox was inducted to the Idaho Sports Hall of Fame in 2014.

== Coaching career ==
=== Idaho Vandals ===
Following his playing career, Cox immediately joined the coaching staff at Idaho as the linebackers coach. He worked for Keith Gilbertson in 1987 and 1988. Following Gilbertson's departure to coach the offensive line at Washington, Idaho brought back John L. Smith (whom served as the defensive coordinator during Cox's playing days) as the head coach. Cox worked on Smith's staff from 1989 to 1994.

While on staff, Idaho won four Big Sky Conference championships, and finished in the Division1-AA top ten rankings five times.

=== Utah State ===
Cox followed John L. Smith to Utah State. He coached the linebackers from 1995 to 1997. Utah State won back-to-back Big West Conference championships in 1996 and 1997.

=== Louisville ===
In 1998, Cox again followed Smith. This time to Louisville and again coaching the linebackers from 1998 to 2002. In 2000 and 2001, Louisville won back to back C-USA championships.

=== Michigan State ===
Following the 2002 season, John L. Smith took the Michigan State head coach position, and again, Cox went with him. He coached the linebackers from 2003 to 2006, and was the recruiting coordinator in 2006. In total, Cox worked for Smith for 17 seasons.

=== St. Louis Rams ===
In 2007, Cox made the lead to the NFL. He joined the staff of the St. Louis Rams as a defensive quality control coach working with the defensive line. In 2008, he was promoted to assistant defensive backs coach. Following a mid-season coaching change, Cox finished the 2008 season as the linebacker coach.

=== Washington ===
From 2009 to 2011, Cox coached the linebackers for Steve Sarkisian at Washington. He led one of the team's strongest units.

=== Kansas State ===
In 2012, Cox joined Bill Snyder’s staff coaching the linebackers for Kansas State. From 2012 to 2016, Cox coached numerous All-Big 12 performers. Following the 2016 season, Cox resigned, citing a desire to spend more time with his family, and he did so throughout the 2017 season.

=== UTEP ===
When Kansas State's offensive coordinator, Dana Dimel, was hired as the new head coach at UTEP, He gave Cox his first opportunity as a defensive coordinator. This opportunity was enough to lure Cox out of retirement, and on December 20, 2017, Dimel announced Cox's addition to the staff. In addition to his coordinator duties, Cox also oversees the linebackers. Following the 2020 football season, Cox was relieved of his duties.

== Personal life ==
Cox and his wife, Jill, have three children, Zac, Jake, and Addison.
