= Elvis Dumervil =

American football player (born 1984)

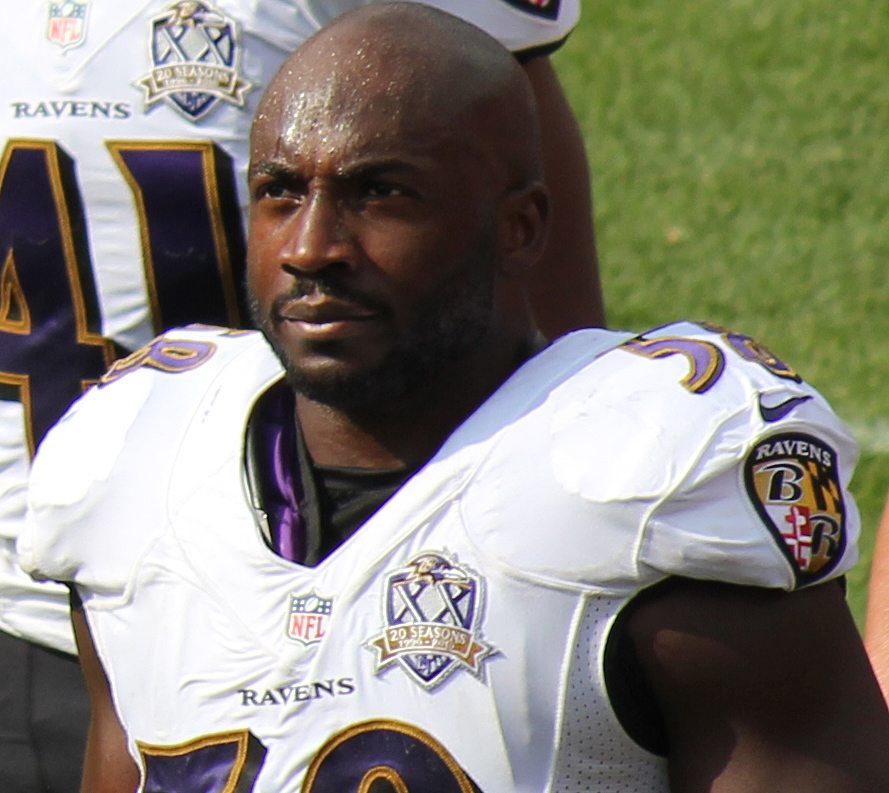
- Dumervil with the Baltimore Ravens in 2015

No. 92, 58
- Positions: Defensive end, linebacker

Personal information
- Born: January 19, 1984 (age 42); Miami, Florida, U.S.
- Listed height: 5 ft 11 in (1.80 m)
- Listed weight: 250 lb (113 kg)

Career information
- High school: Miami Jackson
- College: Louisville (2002–2005)
- NFL draft: 2006: 4th round, 126th overall pick

Career history
- Denver Broncos (2006–2012); Baltimore Ravens (2013–2016); San Francisco 49ers (2017)

Awards and highlights
- 2× First-team All-Pro (2009, 2014); 5× Pro Bowl (2009, 2011, 2012, 2014, 2015); NFL sacks leader (2009); Bronko Nagurski Trophy (2005); Ted Hendricks Award (2005); Bill Willis Trophy (2005); Big East Defensive Player of the Year (2005); Unanimous All-American (2005); NCAA (FBS) records: Forced fumbles in a season: 10

Career NFL statistics
- Total tackles: 365
- Sacks: 105.5
- Forced fumbles: 23
- Fumble recoveries: 13
- Interceptions: 1
- Stats at Pro Football Reference

Elvis Kool Dumervil (born January 19, 1984) is an American former professional football defensive end and linebacker who played in the National Football League (NFL) for 12 seasons. He played college football for the Louisville Cardinals, winning the Bronko Nagurski and Bill Willis trophies and the Ted Hendricks Award in 2005. Dumervil was selected by the Denver Broncos in the fourth round of the 2006 NFL draft.

During his seven seasons with the Broncos, Dumervil was the NFL sacks leader in 2009. He was also named to two Pro Bowls and one first-team All-Pro. Dumervil spent his next four seasons with the Baltimore Ravens, where he extended his Pro Bowl selections to five and his first-team All-Pros to two, as well as setting the franchise record for single-season sacks. In his final season, he was a member of the San Francisco 49ers.

== Early life ==
Dumervil was born in Miami, Florida. His parents were Haitian immigrants to Miami's Little Haiti neighborhood. Dumervil was named after Elvis Presley, of whom his father was a fan. Separated when Dumervil was three years old, they raised a total of 10 children. His half-brother, Curry Burns, played at the University of Louisville and was drafted by the Houston Texans in the 2003 NFL draft.

Dumervil attended Miami Jackson High School, where he was a two-sport star in football and track. He played high school football for the Jackson Generals team. Rated among the top 25 defensive ends by most football recruiting publications, Dumervil had a Jackson High School record 78 career sacks.

== College career ==
Despite standing at 5 ft. 11 in., Dumervil was one of the most dominating defensive players in school history and put together one of the most impressive collegiate seasons in 2005. Dumervil attended the University of Louisville, where he played for coach John L. Smith (2002) and Bobby Petrino's Louisville Cardinals football team from 2003 to 2005. As a freshman in 2002, Dumervil recorded six tackles and two tackles for loss, but he impressed the coaching staff with his quickness and his high energy. After John L. Smith left, Petrino took over, and Dumervil's career took off. In 2003, he tallied just 28 tackles and two sacks. The Cardinal coaching staff had planned on redshirting him during the 2002 season, but injuries to other players and a lackluster performance by the defensive line forced him into the rotation.

He showed glimpses of what was to come in 2004, when he tallied 52 tackles, 11.5 tackles for loss and a team-high 10 sacks in guiding the Cardinals to an 11–1 record and a win over Boise State in one of the most anticipated Liberty Bowls in history. His 2005 season was one of the best for a defensive end in both NCAA and school history, when he broke the NCAA single-game sack record (6) in a 31–24 win against the rival Kentucky Wildcats, and broke the NCAA record for forced fumbles. His sack total also broke the Big East record set by Dwight Freeney, who was a player that Elvis desired to emulate. He finished that season with a school record 20.5 sacks and 10 forced fumbles, which is still the best in NCAA history. He won several awards for the 2005 season, including the Bronko Nagurski Trophy, the Ted Hendricks Award, and Big East player of the year, and was recognized as a unanimous first-team All-American.

In the 2006 Gator Bowl, Virginia Tech quarterback Marcus Vick intentionally stomped on the back of Dumervil's leg after a whistle. While no penalty was called, the backlash from this play (in combination with a misdemeanor charge for driving with a suspended license) led to Vick's permanent dismissal from the Virginia Tech football team. Vick claimed that he had apologized to Dumervil after the game, while Dumervil disputed that claim and stated that he didn't receive any kind of apology from Vick.

In college, he was known for the "strip-sack" maneuver where he would sometimes strip the ball from ball carriers or quarterbacks.

The product of Miami Jackson High finished his career with 151 career tackles, 42.5 tackles for loss and 32 sacks. He ranks third all-time in tackles for loss and second in sacks, and had his No. 58 jersey honored during festivities at a November 7, 2015, home game against Syracuse.

=== Records and rankings ===
- 1st – NCAA single game sack total, 6 vs. the University of Kentucky (September 1, 2005)
- 1st – Big East Conference single season sack total
- 2nd – University of Louisville career sacks (to DeWayne White)

== Professional career ==
=== Pre-draft ===
Despite his collegiate success and comparisons to Colts defensive end Dwight Freeney, Dumervil was selected on the second day of the NFL Draft due to concerns about his small size (5'11", 258 pounds), and the fact that he went without a sack in his final three collegiate games. This may have been due to being consistently double-teamed, but it was perceived by some as a sign of fatigue. Several teams considered moving him to linebacker or only using him in pass rushing situations.

Pre-draft measurables
Height	Weight	Arm length	Hand span	40-yard dash	10-yard split	20-yard split	Bench press
5 ft 11 3/8 in (1.81 m)	257 lb (117 kg)	32 5/8 in (0.83 m)	9 1/8 in (0.23 m)	4.75 s	1.65 s	2.81 s	30 reps
All values from NFL Combine

=== Denver Broncos ===
Dumervil was selected in the fourth round of the 2006 NFL draft by the Denver Broncos. Broncos coach Mike Shanahan stated that he planned to keep Dumervil at defensive end.

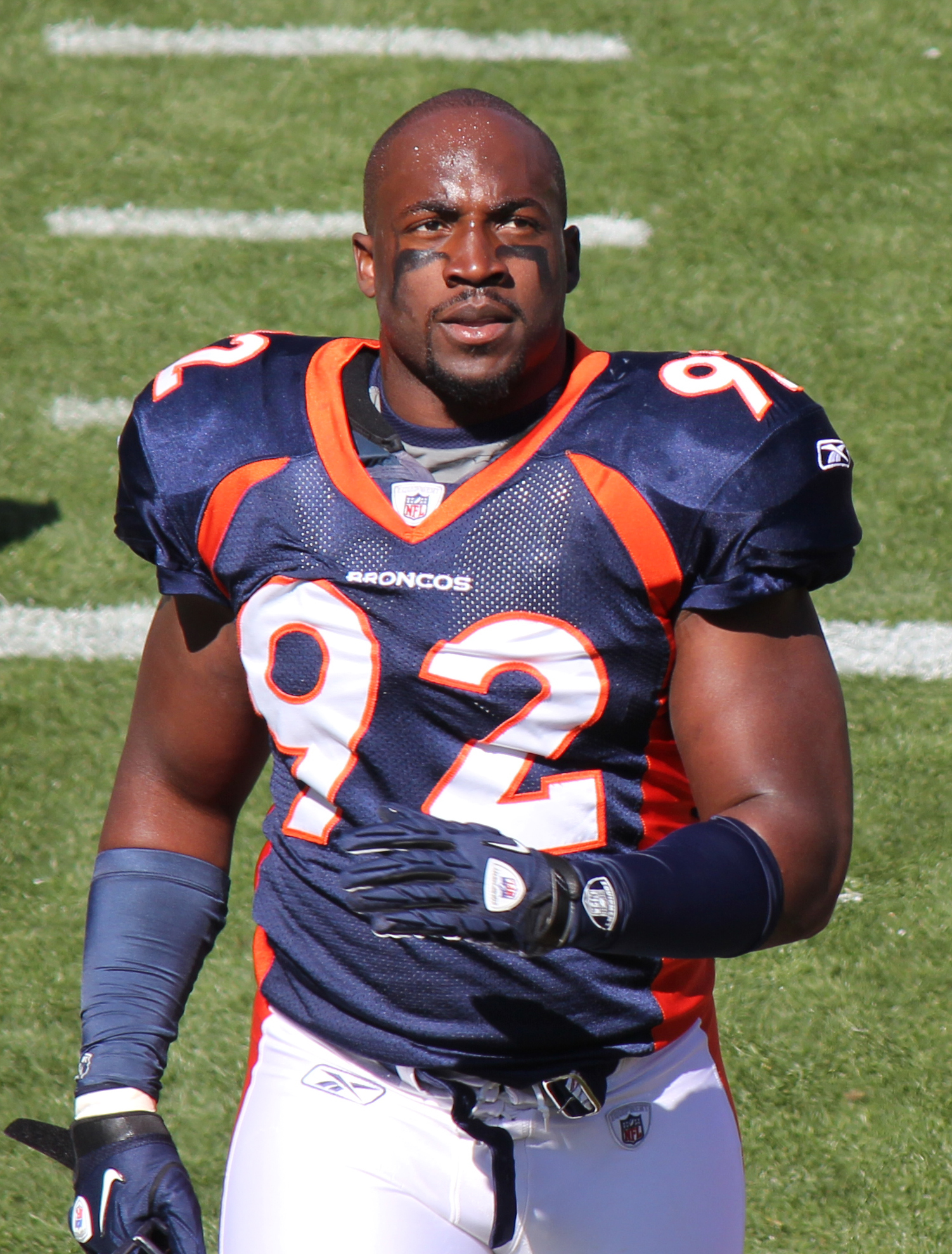
Dumervil with the Denver Broncos in 2011

Early in his rookie season, Dumervil saw little playing time. However, his minutes increased as the season progressed and he finished the year with 8.5 sacks in 13 games. In the first game of the 2007 NFL season, he would get the first and only interception of his career off of J. P. Losman and the Buffalo Bills. Dumervil would go on to lead the Broncos, and finish among league leaders, with 12.5 sacks in 2007.

With the Josh McDaniels coaching regime entering the 2009 season, defensive coordinator Mike Nolan moved Dumervil around as an outside linebacker in his 3–4 defensive scheme, but keeping him as a defensive end on 4–2–5 passing down situations. Dumervil led the league in sacks with 17, and tied a franchise record with 4 in the Sep 20 game against Cleveland. At the conclusion of the season, Dumervil was a near unanimous selection for the All-Pro Team, receiving 46 out of the 50 total votes. He also finished third in voting for Defensive Player of the Year.

In July 2010, Dumervil signed a six-year $61.5 million contract extension (including $43.168 million in guaranteed payments) to keep him with the Broncos through 2015. However, on August 4, 2010, Dumervil suffered a torn pectoral muscle during practice, and missed the entire 2010 season.

Dumervil's contract specified that if he were on the roster at 2:00 PM MT (4:00 PM ET) on March 15, 2013, his $12 million salary for the 2013 season would be fully guaranteed. The Broncos, looking to free up room under the salary cap, reached an agreement to restructure his contract to reduce his 2013 salary cap hit. However, Dumervil and his agent faxed the paperwork six minutes late at 2:06 PM MT, which caused the Broncos to release Dumervil rather than allow the $12 million to be guaranteed. As a result, while the Broncos could have re-signed Dumervil as soon as Saturday, March 16, they accrued $4.869 million in "dead money" against their 2013 cap, in addition to any salary cap hits from the new contract. The snafu led Dumervil to fire his agent.

=== Baltimore Ravens ===
==== 2013 season ====
On March 24, 2013, Dumervil agreed to a 5-year-deal with the Baltimore Ravens worth $35 million, including $8.5 million in the first year of the deal. Dumervil was given No. 58 – his college number at Louisville and the number of Peter Boulware, one of the greatest pass rushers in Ravens' history – with Baltimore because Pro Bowl defensive tackle Haloti Ngata had worn No. 92 – the number Dumervil wore in Denver – for his entire career with the Ravens.

==== 2014 season ====
Dumervil finished his 2014 season tying his career high of sacks with 17, as well as forcing two fumbles. The 17 sacks set a new Baltimore Ravens franchise record. Dumervil and Terrell Suggs combined for the most sacks by a pair in the regular season, as Suggs had 12 of his own and the two totaled 29. He was voted to his fourth Pro Bowl and also named to the Associated Press's All-Pro first-team.

==== 2015 season ====
Dumervil was the highest ranked Raven on the NFL Top 100 Players of 2015 list, coming in at number 46. He was the third highest ranked outside linebacker, behind fellow All-Pros Justin Houston and Von Miller.

Dumervil's production would slow down drastically in 2015, despite starting all 16 games for the Ravens for the first time.

In Week 3, Dumervil sacked Andy Dalton and forced a fumble, which was recovered by linebacker C. J. Mosley and returned 41 yards for a touchdown. However, the Bengals still won 28–24.

In Week 10, Dumervil sacked Blake Bortles twice and defended a pass, but he also ruined Baltimore's chances of winning. On what appeared to be the game's final play, the Jaguars got a snap off before the clock could hit zero, Dumervil ran past the Jacksonville offensive line untouched and got to Bortles. However, he was called for a facemask penalty, giving the Jaguars one last chance to win the game, and they did after kicking a 53-yard field goal with no time left. However, it was determined that Baltimore should have won the game regardless, as the Jaguars were not set on the line during the play in which Dumervil was flagged.

Dumervil's final decent performance of the year came against the Browns on Monday Night Football, where he had 1.5 sacks in a 33–27 win. Dumervil ended the year with 6 sacks, a defended pass and a forced fumble.

Dumervil was selected to play in the 2016 Pro Bowl as an alternate, and arrived in Hawaii after an airline mix up that sent his bags to Japan. He recorded one tackle in the game.

==== 2016 season ====
On March 8, 2017, Dumervil was released by the Ravens.

=== San Francisco 49ers ===
On June 5, 2017, Dumervil signed with the San Francisco 49ers. In 16 games with the 49ers in 2017, Dumervil recorded 6.5 sacks.

On March 9, 2018, the 49ers did not pick up the 2018 option on Dumervil's contract, making him a free agent.

=== Retirement ===
On August 30, 2018, Dumervil announced his retirement from the NFL.

== NFL career statistics ==
Legend
**Bold**	Career high

Year	Team	Games		Tackles				Fumbles			Interceptions					
Year	Team	GP	GS	Cmb	Solo	Ast	Sck	FF	FR	Yds	Int	Yds	Avg	Lng	TD	PD
2006	DEN	13	0	17	14	3	8.5	1	**3**	**13**	0	0	0.0	0	0	1
2007	DEN	16	16	39	34	5	12.5	4	**3**	0	**1**	**27**	**27.0**	**27**	0	**4**
2008	DEN	16	15	24	17	7	5.0	1	1	0	0	0	0.0	0	0	1
2009	DEN	16	14	49	**42**	7	**17.0**	4	1	0	0	0	0.0	0	0	3
2010	DEN	0	0	Did not play due to injury												
2011	DEN	14	14	42	31	11	9.5	0	1	0	0	0	0.0	0	0	1
2012	DEN	16	16	**54**	32	**22**	11.0	**6**	0	0	0	0	0.0	0	0	2
2013	BAL	15	3	31	18	13	9.5	2	0	0	0	0	0.0	0	0	3
2014	BAL	16	2	37	27	10	**17.0**	2	1	0	0	0	0.0	0	0	1
2015	BAL	16	16	48	29	19	6.0	1	2	0	0	0	0.0	0	0	1
2016	BAL	8	3	11	9	2	3.0	2	1	0	0	0	0.0	0	0	0
2017	SF	16	0	13	9	4	6.5	0	0	0	0	0	0.0	0	0	0
Career		162	99	365	262	103	105.5	23	13	13	1	27	27.0	27	0	14
