= 2002 GMAC Bowl =

Louisville Cardinals	Marshall Thundering Herd
(7–5)	(10–2)
C-USA	MAC
15	38
Head coach: John L. Smith	Head coach: Bob Pruett
	AP / Coaches / BCS; NR / 24 / NR
	1	2	3	4	Total
Louisville	0	7	0	8	15
Marshall	7	10	7	14	38
- Date: December 18, 2002
- Season: 2002
- Stadium: Ladd–Peebles Stadium
- Location: Mobile, Alabama
- MVP: Marshall QB Byron Leftwich
- Favorite: Marshall by 2.5
- Referee: Tom Ritter (SEC)
- Attendance: 40,646

United States TV coverage
- Network: ESPN

The 2002 GMAC Bowl was an American college football bowl game. It was part of the 2002 NCAA Division I-A football season and was the fifth edition of the bowl game. It was played in December 2002 and featured the Louisville Cardinals, and the Marshall Thundering Herd.

Marshall started the scoring with a 9-yard touchdown pass from Byron Leftwich to wide receiver Denero Marriott for a 7–0 lead. In the second quarter, Marshall's Curtis Head kicked a 23-yard field goal to give Marshall a 10–0 lead. Leftwich later tossed an 8-yard touchdown pass to wide receiver Demetrius Doss for a 17–0 lead. Louisville got on the board with a 2-yard TJ Patterson touchdown run, making the score 17–7.

In the third quarter, Leftwich again connected with Doss for a 12-yard touchdown pass and a 24–7 lead. He later found Marriott for a 26-yard touchdown pass in the fourth quarter. Franklin Wallace added a 15-yard touchdown run to give Marshall a 38–7 lead. With 13 seconds left in the game, quarterback Dave Ragone found Tiger Jones in the end zone for a Louisville touchdown. The two-point conversion to Jones made the final score 38–15.

The game was also notorious for Louisville's players learning from fans during the first half that head coach John L. Smith had accepted the head coaching job at Michigan State.
