= Louisville Cardinals football =

College football team representing University of Louisville

2026 Louisville Cardinals football team
- First season: 1912; 114 years ago
- Head coach: Jeff Brohm; 4th season, 34–15 (.694)
- Location: Louisville, Kentucky
- Stadium: L&N Federal Credit Union Stadium (capacity: 60,800)
- NCAA division: Division I FBS
- Conference: ACC
- Colors: Red and black
- All-time record: 570–507–17 (.529)
- Bowl record: 14–13–1 (.518)

Conference championships
- MVC: 1970, 1972 C-USA: 2000, 2001, 2004 Big East: 2006, 2011, 2012

Division championships
- ACC Atlantic: 2016
- Heisman winners: Lamar Jackson – 2016
- Consensus All-Americans: 7
- Rivalries: Cincinnati (rivalry); Kentucky (rivalry); Memphis (rivalry); Miami (rivalry)

Uniforms
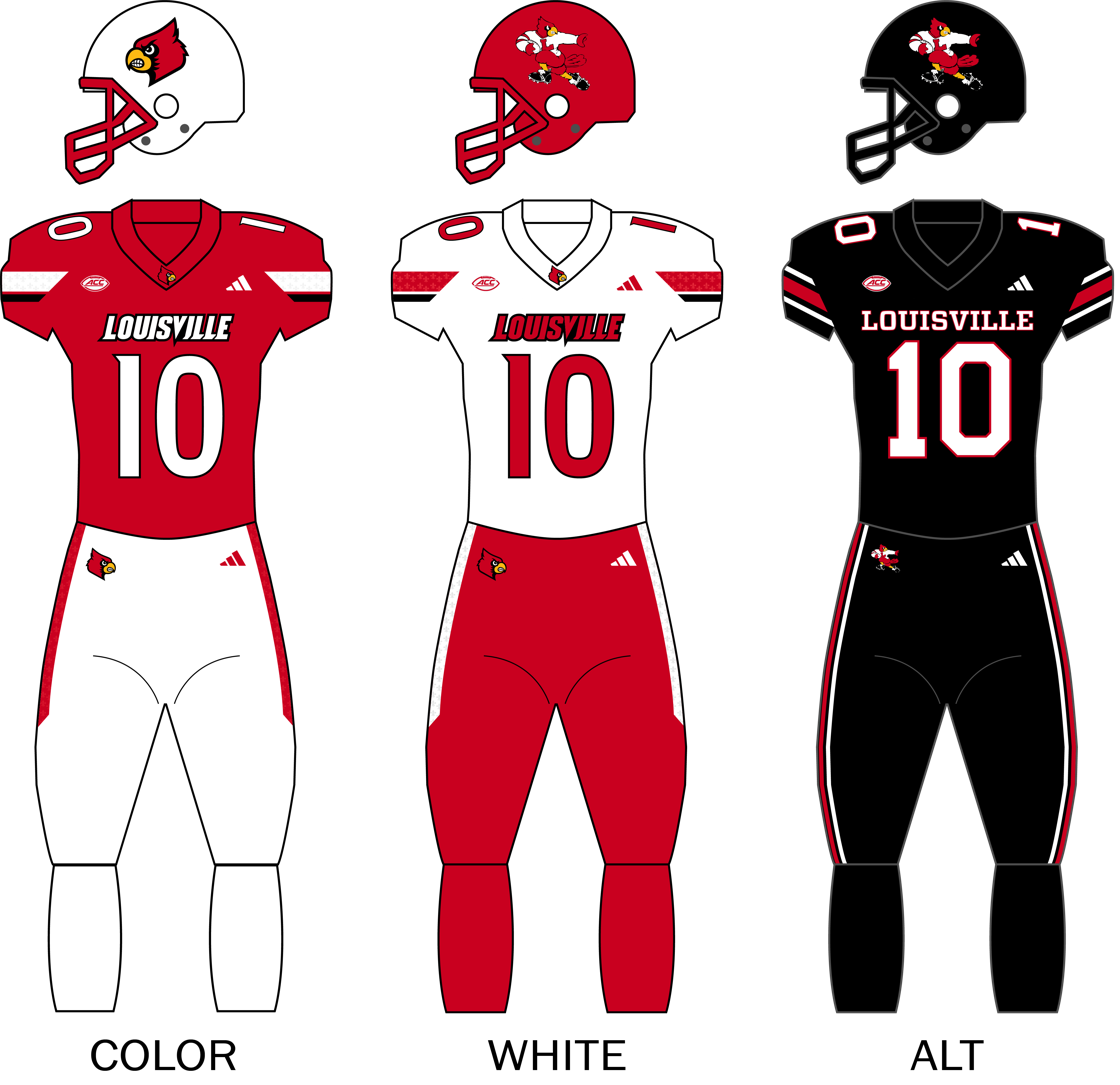
- Fight song: Fight! UofL
- Mascot: Louie The Cardinal Bird
- Marching band: U of L Cardinal Marching Band (Marching Cards)
- Outfitter: Adidas
- Website: gocards.com

The Louisville Cardinals football team represents the University of Louisville in the sport of American football. The Cardinals compete in the Football Bowl Subdivision (FBS) of the National Collegiate Athletic Association (NCAA) and compete in the Atlantic Coast Conference.

== History ==
=== Early history (1912–1924) ===
The University of Louisville began playing football in 1912 where the Cardinals went 3–1. Louisville had played several years at club level and teams were mostly composed of medical students. Beginning in 1914 the Cardinals joined the Southern Intercollegiate Athletic Association (SIAA) and they would participate in Kentucky Intercollegiate Athletic Conference (KIAC). Louisville did not field a team in the 1917–1921 seasons.

When the Cardinals did rejoin football they came back into the SIAA which was going through reorganization losing most major state schools and thus became a small college conference. The Cardinals would face mostly Kentucky state schools such as Eastern Kentucky, Murray State, Western Kentucky, and Morehead State, along with private state schools like Centre, Transylvania, Kentucky Wesleyan, and Georgetown College.

=== Tom King era (1925–1930) ===
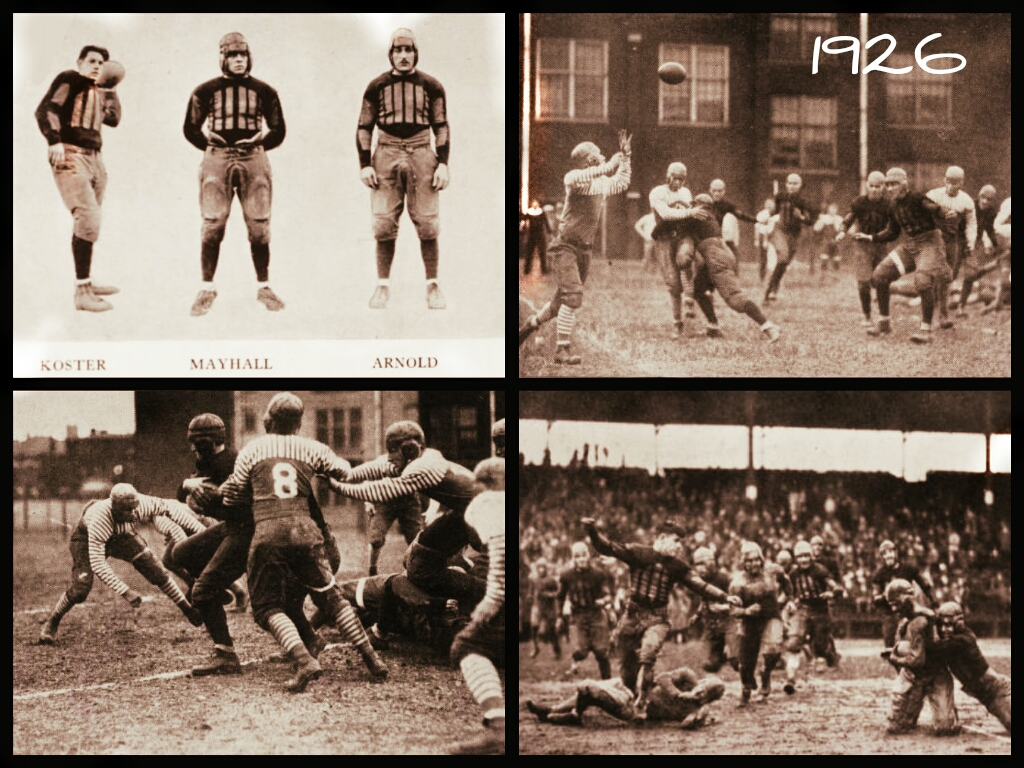
The 1926 football team saw success thanks to the direction of AD-Head Coach Tom King

Tom King was the first coach to attempt to build a program at Louisville. King played college football at Notre Dame (1915–1916) under Coach Palmer and Knute Rockne. King was an undersized end for the Irish who became well regarded at Notre Dame for his determination and speed. Before he came to the football team for punt returns he was on the track team and basketball team, where he was named captain in 1916. His experience at Notre Dame gave him ideas on developing a spread wing offense so his undersized players could be better utilized.

His first standout was Fred Koster. Koster drew national attention to Louisville in 1926 by racking up 68 points in his first 2 games of the season. In six games, Koster scored 18 touchdowns, 10 extra points, and 2 field goals and went on to finish second in scoring in college football with 124 points. Koster was an all-around athlete and was a letterman 16 times, 4 times each in baseball, basketball, football, and track. Koster was a standout forward for the basketball team, leading the team in scoring two years. In baseball, Koster played professionally for 10 years for the Philadelphia Phillies (one season) as well as the minor league teams Louisville Colonels and St. Paul Saints in the American Association.

Tom King had the program going in the right direction until he decided to play Detroit for $10,000. Rockne, who was head coach at Notre Dame and a fellow graduate, called King and asked if he would take the Detroit game because Rockne felt his team was not up to it. When King asked what was in it for Louisville Rockne replied $10,000, which was a substantial sum of money in 1928 for an athletics department. Louisville started the season with a 72–0 win over Eastern Kentucky but when they traveled to Detroit they were hammered with injuries and did not win another game or score for the rest of the season, as Detroit went undefeated and claimed a share of the national title.

King served as head football coach for two more years but he also served as track, baseball, basketball and athletic director during his tenure at Louisville. Louisville athletics took a step back when Dr. Raymond Kent was announced as the new president of Louisville. Dr. Kent began reducing the budget in the athletics department, making it difficult for teams to travel and outfit themselves. King, on the advice of his friend Rockne, moved on, and in 1933 became assistant coach at Michigan State.

=== Laurie Apitz Era (1936–1942) ===
Following years of instability in the Louisville program after Tom King's departure and three coaches in the span of five seasons, the university hired Lawrence E. Apitz. Apitz came from the University of the Pacific in Stockton, California where he coached basketball there from 1933 to 1936. He played football at the University of Chicago from 1926 to 1927 where he was a third-team selection to the 1926 All-Big Ten Conference football team. Apitz was the head coach at Louisville for seven seasons, he had an overall record of 22–29–3. He only produced one winning season which was the 1939 season posting a 5–3–1 overall record and a 1–1–1 record in conference play which was tied for 14th place in the Southern Intercollegiate Athletic Association. When Apitz got hired it was the height of the great depression and due to budget constraints, he coached the basketball and track teams along with the football team. When World War 2 caused football to be suspended at the university Apitz was reassigned to the physical education program for the hundreds of Navy cadets on campus. This was Apitz's last assignment at the university as he left shortly after. The Louisville football team did not start back up until 1946.

=== Frank Camp era (1946–1968) ===
Frank Camp revived the Cardinal Program in 1946 after World War II. Camp was collegiate player at Transylvania University in both football and basketball went on to accumulate a 102–35–04 record as a high school coach before he was tabbed for the head job at Louisville. Camp was responsible for moving away from the traditional KIAC competition and moving towards a more competitive schedule including match ups against some powerhouse traditional teams. Camp would see success early after going 7–0–1 in his second year and was accredited for being able to gel current players with the new recruits returning from war.

Camp, like King, would see another president pull resources and scholarships in the early 1950s, and would see both Otto Knop, who at the time was being recruited by Bear Bryant of Kentucky, and Johnny Unitas, who was being recruited by Indiana, elect to stay at Louisville and play for Camp. Louisville did see a lot of talent leave and they went into a slump from 1950 to 1954. Camp would only suffer two losing seasons for the rest of his career. The loss of the scholarships saw a loss talent on the team. So when scholarships were again available Camp would start to recruit black players and integrate the sports program at Louisville. Camp's legacy is tied to three players he brought to Louisville: Johnny Unitas, Lenny Lyles and Otto Knop.

The most enduring legacy Camp left behind was pioneering integration in southern athletics. Camp's first African-American player was Lawrence "Bumpy" Simmons, a local product from Central High School. He only played one year in 1952 and left the team on good terms. Camp would bring in Andy Walker, George Cain and Lenny Lyles in 1954 and they would become the first black scholarship players at Louisville. Once the university was integrated in 1951, Camp and his assistant coach, Wood, sought out potential recruits. Coach Wood would be integral in bringing in Lyles who was also a track star. All three players would go on to become starters and Lyles and Cain would become a dangerous tandem in the backfield.

Camp would introduce the rivalry of Memphis, taking the Cards out of independency and joining the Missouri Valley Conference (MVC) and lead the Cards to their first bowl game during his tenure. The University of Louisville made its first bowl appearance January 1, 1958, as Frank Camp's squad battered Drake 34–20 in the Sun Bowl. The victory over the Drake Bulldogs capped a near-perfect season for the Cardinals. UofL finished with a 9–1 record. Louisville's squad was headed by Lenny Lyles, the nation's leading rusher. Unfortunately, Lyles went down in the first quarter with an injury. He managed just six yards on two carries. In Lyles' absence, Ken Porco and Pete Bryant stepped forward offensively. Porco ran for a game-high 119 yards on 20 carries. Bryant added 80 yards on 14 carries, while also tossing a 20-yard scoring pass.

Camp coached the Cardinals until his retirement following the 1968 season. Camp is the Cardinals' all-time wins leader among head coaches in Louisville football history. Camp would also see the Cardinals leave Parkway Field and move to Manual Stadium. The stadium held 17,000 seats and was relief for players because they no longer had to play on a baseball field and it was well lit. In 1957, the Cards moved to Fairgrounds Stadium (later to be named Cardinal Stadium), serving as their home until they moved to the new Cardinal Stadium (then called Papa John's Cardinal Stadium) in 1998. In their inaugural season at Fairgrounds Stadium the Cardinals finished the season 9–1 with their first bowl appearance winning in the Sun Bowl against Drake 34–20. Louisville ended I-A independence by joining the MVC in 1963 only to leave for independency again in 1974. During Camp's tenure at Louisville he amassed a 118–95–2 record with a 1–0 bowl record to become the all-time winningest coach at Louisville. He retired following the 1968 season.

==== Johnny Unitas ====
In 1951, five games into Johnny Unitas' freshman season (Unitas was allowed to play as a freshman because Louisville had not yet joined the NCAA), he entered the game against St. Bonaventure when Louisville was trailing, 19–0. Unitas completed 11 consecutive passes, 3 for touchdowns, in a steady rain and helped put the Cards in front, 21–19. But St. Bonaventure kicked a last-ditch field goal and Louisville lost, 22–21. With Unitas leading the way, Louisville won its next four games, including a 35–28 victory over Houston; Louisville was a 19-point underdog against the Cougars. In that game the Cardinals were leading 28–21 and had the ball on their own eight-yard line in the fourth quarter. After two unsuccessful running plays, Unitas dropped back into his own end zone, sidestepped two defenders and threw a pass to Babe Ray, who scored a 92-yard TD.

In the next day's Louisville Courier-Journal, expressing a desire to preserve Unitas over the winter for the next season, reporter Jimmy Brown wrote: "If Coach Frank Camp is smart he'll take a certain Cardinal, enclose him in a cellophane bag, and put him right in with the uniforms for safekeeping."

In his sophomore season, Unitas completed 77 of his 154 passes and threw 12 TDs. Louisville went 3–5 that year. At Florida State, Unitas completed 17 of 22 passes in a 41–14 victory. Louisville, though, almost lost Unitas around this time due to administrative cost-cutting which caused 15 players to lose their athletic scholarships, thus emptying out much of the Cardinal roster. Unitas thought about transferring to Indiana, a program that denied him earlier, but decided to stay at Louisville out of loyalty to Coach Camp for taking a chance on him. Unitas holds just a few records at Louisville, most of them eclipsed by quarterbacks John Madeya, Ed Rubbert, Browning Nagle, Jeff Brohm, Marty Lowe, Chris Redman, Dave Ragone and Stefan LeFors. Unitas finished his career completing 247 of 502 passes for 2,912 yards and 27 touchdowns.

Unitas left Louisville and became the ninth-round pick of the Pittsburgh Steelers in 1955, but was cut by them in a numbers game. The Steelers had four quarterbacks; they only needed three. Unitas was the odd man out.

Unitas took a job with a Pittsburgh tiling company following the cut and then he joined the Bloomfield Rams, a semi-pro team. He made six dollars a game. But Unitas did not linger long in the bush league. The Colts got wind of him and invited him for a tryout. He made the team, signing for $7,000.

Unitas was inducted into the Pro Football Hall of Fame in 1979 and his record 47-consecutive-game touchdown passes is a record compared to Joe DiMaggio's 56-game hitting streak. (Drew Brees broke the record in 2012.)

==== Lenny Lyles ====
A trailblazer in the integration of the Louisville Cardinals football program, Lenny Lyles was a player on both sides of the football from 1954 to 1957. Although he faced many unwelcoming crowds in his time at Louisville he always had the support of his coaches and teammates. On a recruiting trip to IU, track star Milt Campbell would advise Lyles against IU so Lyles would settle in his hometown university and play for Camp. The Central High product was a prize recruit for Louisville not only for his skill on the field but also to help attract other black players to the school. Louisville was coming out of a de-emphasis on sports and scholarships were now available to offer.

A four-year starter for the Cardinals, Lyles totaled 2,786 yards on the ground and scored a school-record 41 touchdowns in his storied career, including 19 in 1957 to set a single season record which stood for more than 40 years. He is the school's second all-time scoring leader with 300 points in his storied career. He became the first Cardinal to surpass the 1,000-yard mark in a single season. In 1957, his 1,207 yards not only earned him All-America acclaim but led all of college football. He was selected in the first round of the 1958 NFL draft by the Baltimore Colts, where he teamed with Johnny Unitas.

==== Otto Knop ====
A four-year letterwinner at linebacker and center from 1949 to 1952, Otto Knop earned honorable mention Associated Press Little All-America honors as a sophomore and United Press International All-America his junior year. He was inducted into the UofL Athletic Hall of Fame in 1979 in its second induction class, and was inducted into the Kentucky Athletic Hall of Fame in 1995. His most memorable highlight was a fumble recovery that led to the tying touchdown in a stunning 13–13 deadlock at heavily favored Miami (FL) in 1950.

=== Lee Corso era (1969–1972) ===
Following Frank Camp's retirement, Navy defensive backs coach Lee Corso was hired to take over as Louisville's head football coach. Under Corso, the Cardinals went 28–11–3. Corso's final season saw the Cardinals finish 9–1 and ranked No. 18 in the final AP Poll. Corso would be the last coach until John L. Smith to leave Louisville with a winning record overall. After four seasons at Louisville, Corso left to become the head football coach at Indiana. Today, Corso is a well-known college football analyst for ESPN College Gameday.

=== Alley, Gibson and Weber (1973–1984) ===
Following Lee Corso's departure Louisville's football program struggled mightily as fan support grew weaker and weaker. The years between Corso's departure and Howard Schnellenberger's arrival are considered the dark years for Louisville football. Louisville only made one bowl appearance during the tenures of T. W. Alley, Vince Gibson and Bob Weber, the 1977 Independence Bowl, which they lost to Louisiana Tech. All three of those head coaches had losing records at Louisville. T. W. Alley was hired to replace Corso, but was fired after two unsuccessful seasons. Vince Gibson was then hired to lead the football program. During Vince Gibson's tenure at Louisville, Gibson nicknamed his team the "Red Rage". Although the moniker is no longer used to describe the football team, several other university organizations over the years have used the "Red Rage" nickname. Gibson had the best overall record of the three coaches between Corso and Schnellenberger at 25–29–2. After Gibson came Bob Weber, who went 20–35 in five seasons. After Weber's tenure, athletic officials considered dropping from Division I-A (now FBS) to I-AA (now FCS) in football, due to the program's on-the-field struggles and low attendance and fan support, but decided to stay at the I-A level.

Although this was a low point for the Cardinals in their history they did produce some notable NFL talent. Walter Peacock (1972–1975), Louisville's all-time leading rusher would become the first star of this era, at 3,204 yards Peacock would account for much of the Cards offense. On the defensive side of the ball Louisville Legends Frank Minnifield (1979–82), Otis Wilson (1977–79) and Dwayne Woodruff (1976–78) would go on to long NFL careers. Louisville would also begin producing elite wide receivers such as Ernest Givens (1984–85) and Mark Clayton (1979–82), Clayton would go on to become the first Cardinal to break the 1,000 yard mark with 1,112 receiving yards in a season (1981) until Arnold Jackson surpassed him in 1998. Joe Jacoby (1978–80) would go on to a very successful NFL career with 3 Super Bowls wins and becoming a 4 time Pro-Bowler for the Washington Redskins. Jacoby was not the only offensive line to see a long NFL career, Bruce Armstrong would go to play 13 season with the New England Patriots and accumulate 6 Pro-Bowls and 2 2nd team selections along the way.

=== Howard Schnellenberger era (1985–1994) ===
Following five unsuccessful seasons under the guidance of Bob Weber, Howard Schnellenberger, a native of Louisville and 1983 National Champion as the head football coach at Miami, was hired in hopes of making Louisville a national title contender for the first time. At the press conference announcing his hiring, Schnellenberger drew laughs when he said the Cardinals were "on a collision course with the national championship. The only variable is time."

Prior to accepting the Louisville job, Schnellenberger turned a lowly Miami football program that was nearly dropped from the athletic department into a national champion in five years. Schnellenberger also played at Kentucky for and served as offensive coordinator at Alabama under Bear Bryant. His best team was the 1990 unit, which went 10–1–1 and routed Alabama in the 1991 Fiesta Bowl en route to appearances in the final media polls. The 1990 season highlighted what was, at the time, the most successful decade in U of L football history. His teams earned 90 percent of the school's all-time TV appearances, made its first-ever appearance in a major bowl and helped increase stadium attendance. During the 1990 season alone, home attendance averaged 36,189, just over 36,103 "Old" Cardinal Stadium football limit.

His teams played a coast-to-coast schedule against the top conferences in the nation and produced victories over such teams as Texas (1), Alabama (1), Michigan State (1), North Carolina (1), Virginia (1), North Carolina State (1), West Virginia (1), Boston College (1), Arizona State (2) and Pittsburgh (4).

Schnellenberger also took Louisville to the Liberty Bowl in 1993, where it defeated Michigan State. 1993 would become a reflection of what the coach was trying to build by scheduling Texas, Texas A&M, Tennessee, Arizona St., Pittsburgh and West Virginia. With Louisville announcing that it would give up independent status and join Conference USA, a weak football conference at the time, for the 1995 season, Schnellenberger left for Oklahoma after the 1994 season. Years later, he said that the Cardinals would not be able to compete for a national championship while playing in Conference USA. While he never won a national title at Louisville, he did revive a program that had been on life support when he arrived. For that reason, even though he had a losing overall record of 54–56–2 in 10 seasons, he remains in the good graces of Cardinal fans.

Schnellenberger's lasting legacy at U of L, however, is new Cardinal Stadium, which he proposed from the minute he arrived. Schnellenberger planned and raised the money for its construction, but left for Oklahoma before the stadium opened. In 2006, Louisville named the Cardinals' football fieldhouse the Howard L. Schnellenberger Football Complex with Schnellenberger in attendance before U of L's game against Florida Atlantic University. The most valuable player award for the annual UofL-UK game is also named for him because he was born and raised in Louisville and he played at Kentucky.

=== Ron Cooper era (1995–1997) ===
Following the departure of Howard Schnellenberger to Oklahoma, Ron Cooper was hired away from Eastern Michigan, where he had a 9–13 record in two seasons as the head football coach. Cooper had also been an assistant at Notre Dame under Lou Holtz. Cooper was the first African American head football coach in Louisville football history, and also the youngest. He was 32 years old when he was named head coach. The committee responsible for hiring Cooper was very impressed with Cooper's optimism and vision for the program. Louisville went 6–5 and 5–6 in Cooper's first two seasons, but fell to 1–10 in Cooper's third and ultimately final season, prompting newly hired athletic director Tom Jurich to fire Cooper.

=== John L. Smith era (1998–2002) ===
After the firing of Ron Cooper, Jurich hired Utah State head coach John L. Smith as the new Louisville head football coach. Smith kick-started the program and went 7–5, 7–5, 9–3, 11–2 and 7–6 in his five seasons as head coach. On December 19, 2002, Smith accepted the head coaching job at Michigan State. He informed his Louisville players of the decision at halftime of the GMAC Bowl, which ended with a 38–15 loss to Marshall.

=== Bobby Petrino era (2003–2006) ===
Bobby Petrino, Auburn offensive coordinator and a former Louisville offensive coordinator under Smith, was hired to be the new head football coach. Petrino also served as offensive coordinator for the NFL's Jacksonville Jaguars under Tom Coughlin and tutored Jake Plummer while serving as an assistant coach at Arizona State. The high-scoring offense that was seen during John L. Smith's tenure got better under Petrino's guidance. The Cards earned national rankings as high as sixth in 2004 and 2006 during Petrino's tenure. Petrino went 41–9 in four seasons as head football coach, the best winning percentage (.82) of any head coach in Louisville football history. Prior to the 2006 season, Petrino agreed to a ten-year contract extension with Louisville, giving the impression he was going to be at Louisville for the long haul. Louisville went 12–1 in 2006, winning the Big East championship and the Orange Bowl, the school's first appearance in a Bowl Championship Series bowl game. The Cardinals had hopes of playing in the BCS National Championship Game before losing at Rutgers in November. After winning the Orange Bowl, and only six months after agreeing to a contract extension, Petrino left after accepting an offer to be the head coach of the NFL's Atlanta Falcons, a position he resigned before completing his first season, after 13 games.

=== Steve Kragthorpe era (2007–2009) ===
Less than 48 hours after Petrino's departure for the Atlanta Falcons, Steve Kragthorpe was hired from Tulsa, where he had gone 29–22 in four seasons as the head football coach. Things began to go downhill in Kragthorpe's first season as the Cardinals, fresh off an Orange Bowl win with most of the players returning, began the season ranked in the top 10 in the AP and Coaches' Poll but struggled to a 6–6 record and were not invited to a bowl for the first time since Ron Cooper's final season in 1997. A 5–7 2008 season followed that, and after finishing the 2009 season 4–8, Jurich fired Kragthorpe. Much of the fan base and media felt like Kragthorpe underachieved, was not a strong recruiter, and never had control of the program throughout his tenure as head coach.

=== Charlie Strong era (2010–2013) ===
Coach Strong

On December 9, 2009, Charlie Strong was hired as Louisville's 21st head coach.

After back to back 7–6 seasons in 2010 and 2011, Strong led Louisville to an 11–2 season in 2012 capped with a Sugar Bowl win over Florida, Louisville's second BCS game victory in school history, and after the season, Strong agreed to terms on a new contract that made him the seventh-highest paid head football coach in the country.

Strong's 2013 Cardinals team posted a 12–1 overall record with a dominating victory over Miami in the Russell Athletic Bowl. The 12-win season was the Cardinals' second in program history. On November 28, 2012, it was announced that Louisville would join the Atlantic Coast Conference, beginning in 2014. On January 4, 2014, it was announced that head coach Charlie Strong was leaving Louisville to accept the head football coach position at Texas.

=== Petrino's return (2014–2018) ===
In January 2014, seven years after leaving for the Atlanta Falcons, Bobby Petrino left Western Kentucky to return to Louisville as head coach after Strong's departure. In 2015, the team won the Music City Bowl in their second year under Petrino, in part due to the outstanding performance of freshman quarterback Lamar Jackson, who ran for 226 yards and scored four touchdowns.

The next season, Jackson, now the full-time starting quarterback, continued to impress, passing for 30 touchdowns and rushing for 21 more, leading Louisville to a 9–4 record, highlighted by a 63–20 win over then No. 2 Florida State. Jackson won the Heisman Trophy, Maxwell Award and Walter Camp Award, the first time a Louisville player had won any of the three. Despite the tremendous personal successes, the team lost in the Citrus Bowl to the slightly favored LSU Tigers.

Unfortunately for Petrino and the Cardinals, Jackson's presence had masked severe deficiencies with the offensive line, running game and defense. Those weaknesses were exposed in full in 2018 following Jackson's departure for the NFL. The Cardinals bottomed out with a seven-game losing streak, including blowouts by Clemson and Syracuse by a combined score of 131–39. Days after the 54–23 loss to Syracuse, Petrino was fired with a 2–8 record. Secondary coach Lorenzo Ward was named interim coach to finish the season, which ended with two more losses. The Cardinals finished the season 2–10, their worst season in over two decades.

=== Scott Satterfield era (2018–2022) ===
On December 4, 2018, Louisville hired Scott Satterfield as the program's 22nd different head coach. Satterfield was previously the head coach of his alma mater Appalachian State for the last 6 seasons.

On December 5, 2022, the University of Cincinnati hired Scott Satterfield to be the program's next head coach, replacing Luke Fickell. Deion Branch was named interim head coach for the Cardinals bowl game against Cincinnati.

=== Jeff Brohm era (2023–present) ===
On December 8, 2022, Jeff Brohm was hired as Louisville's 24th head coach. Jeff Brohm is a Louisville native and played college football for the Cardinals from 1989 to 1993. Brohm was an assistant coach for Louisville from 2003 to 2008. Brohm returned to his alma mater after head coaching stints at Western Kentucky (2014–2016) and Purdue University (2017–2022).

In his first season as head coach, the Cards compiled a 10–2 regular season record and Louisville's first ACC Championship berth. Louisville would later lose the ACC Championship 16–6 to #4 Florida State on December 2, 2023. The Cardinals went on to face USC in the Holiday Bowl on December 27, 2026, losing 42–28.

Brohm steered Louisville to a 5-3 ACC standing a 9–4 overall record in 2024. The Cardinals 2024 record against nationally ranked opponents was mixed. Louisville lost 31–24 to #16 Notre Dame on September 28, 2024, and then 52–45 to #6 Miami on October 19, 2024. But Brohm was able to topple #11 Clemson, winning 33–21, on November 2, 2024. Though the Cardinals didn't repeat their 2023 ACC Championship appearance, they did defeat Washington 35–34 in the Sun Bowl on December 31, 2024.

In 2025, Brohm's Cardinals equaled their 2024 9–4 overall standing, but wound up just 4–4 for the ACC. Brohm opened the season with four consecutive wins against Eastern Kentucky, James Madison, Bowling Green, and Pittsburgh.

Then, the Cardinals suffered their first loss of the 2025 season versus #24 Virginia in a close game that ended up 30–27 after a single overtime. Louisville stormed back two weeks later, defeating #2 Miami 24–21 away, followed by two more decisive victories against Boston College 38–24, and Virginia Tech 28–16.

The final weeks of the season took a turn for the worse, as Louisville lost its next three consecutive games against California 29–26 in overtime, Clemson 20–19, and SMU 38–6. Brohm and the Cardinals shutout Kentucky 41–0 in the Governor's Cup, ending the regular season on a high note.

Louisville faced Toledo in the 2025 Boca Raton Bowl, winning 27–22, rounding out another respectable season.

== Conference affiliations ==
Louisville has been both independent and affiliated with multiple conferences.

- Independent (1912–1947, 1949–1962)
- Ohio Valley Conference (1948)
- Missouri Valley Conference (1963–1974)
- Independent (1975–1995)
- Conference USA (1996–2004)
- Big East (2005–2012)
- American Athletic Conference (2013)
- Atlantic Coast Conference (2014–present)

== Championships ==
=== Conference championships ===
Louisville claims eight conference championships, five outright and three shared.

Season	Conference	Coach	Overall Record	Conference Record
1970	Missouri Valley Conference	Lee Corso	8–3–1	4–0
1972†	Missouri Valley Conference	Lee Corso	9–1	4–1
2000	Conference USA	John L. Smith	9–3	6–1
2001	Conference USA	John L. Smith	11–2	6–1
2004	Conference USA	Bobby Petrino	11–1	8–0
2006	Big East Conference	Bobby Petrino	12–1	6–1
2011†	Big East Conference	Charlie Strong	7–6	5–2
2012†	Big East Conference	Charlie Strong	11–2	5–2

† Co-champions

=== Division championships and championship game berths ===
Year	Coach	Division/Seed	Opponent	Result
2016†	Bobby Petrino	ACC Atlantic	N/A lost tiebreaker to Clemson	
2023	Jeff Brohm	ACC Runner-up	Florida State	L 6–16

† Co-champions

== Bowl games ==
Louisville has been to 28 bowl games; their overall bowl record is 14–13–1. During the BCS era (1998–2013), the Cardinals appeared in two BCS bowl games. Louisville attended a bowl each season from 1998 to 2006, and had a streak of eight seasons with bowl appearances (2010–2017).

Year	Bowl	Opponent	Result
1957	Sun Bowl	Drake	W 34–20
1970	Pasadena Bowl	Long Beach State	T 24–24
1977	Independence Bowl	Louisiana Tech	L 14–24
1990	Fiesta Bowl	Alabama	W 34–7
1993	Liberty Bowl	Michigan State	W 18–7
1998	Motor City Bowl	Marshall	L 29–48
1999	Humanitarian Bowl	Boise State	L 31–34
2000	Liberty Bowl	Colorado State	L 17–22
2001	Liberty Bowl	BYU	W 28–10
2002	GMAC Bowl	Marshall	L 15–38
2003	GMAC Bowl	Miami (OH)	L 28–49
2004	Liberty Bowl	Boise State	W 44–40
2005	Gator Bowl	Virginia Tech	L 24–35
2006	Orange Bowl (BCS)	Wake Forest	W 24–13
2010	Beef 'O' Brady's Bowl	Southern Miss	W 31–28
2011	Belk Bowl	NC State	L 24–31
2012	Sugar Bowl (BCS)	Florida	W 33–23
2013	Russell Athletic Bowl	Miami (FL)	W 36–9
2014	Belk Bowl	Georgia	L 14–37
2015	Music City Bowl	Texas A&M	W 27–21
2016	Citrus Bowl	LSU	L 9–29
2017	TaxSlayer Bowl	Mississippi State	L 27–31
2019	Music City Bowl	Mississippi State	W 38–28
2021	First Responder Bowl	Air Force	L 28–31
2022	Fenway Bowl	Cincinnati	W 24–7
2023	Holiday Bowl	USC	L 28–42
2024	Sun Bowl	Washington	W 35–34
2025	Boca Raton Bowl	Toledo	W 27–22

Bowl record by game

Bowl	Appearances	Win	Loss	Tie	Win %
Beef 'O' Brady's Bowl	1	1	0	0	1.000
Belk Bowl	2	0	2	0	.000
Boca Raton Bowl	1	1	0	0	1.000
Citrus Bowl	1	0	1	0	.000
Fenway Bowl	1	1	0	0	1.000
Fiesta Bowl	1	1	0	0	1.000
First Responder Bowl	1	0	1	0	.000
Gator Bowl †	2	0	2	0	.000
GMAC Bowl	2	0	2	0	.000
Holiday Bowl	1	0	1	0	.000
Humanitarian Bowl	1	0	1	0	.000
Independence Bowl	1	0	1	0	.000
Liberty Bowl	4	3	1	0	.750
Motor City Bowl	1	0	1	0	.000
Music City Bowl	2	2	0	0	1.000
Orange Bowl (BCS)	1	1	0	0	1.000
Pasadena Bowl	1	0	0	1	.500
Russell Athletic Bowl	1	1	0	0	1.000
Sugar Bowl (BCS)	1	1	0	0	1.000
Sun Bowl	2	2	0	0	1.000
Total	28	14	13	1	.518

† The 2017 Gator Bowl was known as the TaxSlayer Bowl.

== National rankings ==
As of the end of the 2025 football season, Louisville has ended the season ranked 12 times in either the AP poll or CFP rankings.

Year	Record	AP Poll	CFP†
1972	9–1–0	18	—N/a
1990	10–1–1	14	—N/a
1993	9–3–0	24	—N/a
2001	11–2–0	17	—N/a
2004	11–1–0	6	—N/a
2005	9–3–0	19	—N/a
2006	12–1–0	6	—N/a
2012	11–2–0	13	—N/a
2013	12–1–0	15	—N/a
2014	9–4–0	24	21
2016	9–4–0	21	13
2023	10–4–0	19	15

† CFP rankings started in 2014. The final rankings are before bowl games are played.

== Head coaches ==
Years	Coach	Games	Record	Pct.
1912–1913	Lester Larson	10	8–2	.800
1914	Bruce Baker	5	1–4	.200
1915–1916	Will Duffy	13	3–8–2	.308
1921–1922	Bill Duncan	14	4–9–1	.321
1923–1924	Fred Enke	17	8–8–1	.500
1925–1930	Tom King	48	27–21	.563
1931	Jack McGrath	8	0–8	.000
1932	C. V. Money	9	0–9	.000
1933–1935	Ben Cregor	23	4–18–1	.196
1936–1942	Laurie Apitz	54	22–29–3	.435
1946–1968	Frank Camp	215	118–95–2	.553
1969–1972	Lee Corso	42	28–11–3	.702
1973–1974	T.W. Alley	22	9–13	.409
1975–1979	Vince Gibson	56	25–29–2	.464
1980–1984	Bob Weber	55	20–35	.364
1985–1994	Howard Schnellenberger	112	54–56–2	.491
1995–1997	Ron Cooper	33	13–20	.394
1998–2002	John L. Smith	62	41–21	.661
2003–2006	Bobby Petrino	50	41–9	.820
2007–2009	Steve Kragthorpe	36	15–21	.417
2010–2013	Charlie Strong	52	37–15	.712
2014–2018	Bobby Petrino (cumulative record)	52 (102)	34–18 (75–27)	.654 (.735)
2018–2019	Lorenzo Ward †	2	0–2	.000
2019–2022	Scott Satterfield	49	25–24	.510
2022	Deion Branch†	1	1–0	1.000
2023–present	Jeff Brohm	40	28–12	.700

† Interim

== All-time head-to-head records ==
=== All-time record against current ACC teams ===
Louisville joined the ACC in 2014 and has played under three different conference schedule formats. Through the 2022 season, Louisville played in the ACC Atlantic division. In 2023, the ACC removed divisions to play a 3–5–5 format. In this format Louisville would play Georgia Tech, Miami, and Virginia annually. In 2024, the ACC expanded to 17 teams with the additions of California, SMU, and Stanford. As a result, the 3–5–5 format was abandoned after only one year and was replaced with the current 17 team format which is set through the 2030 season. Louisville has no annual matchups but will play every ACC team at least twice, once at home and once on the road.

The table below includes non-conference meetings played either before Louisville joined the conference or before Louisville's opponent joined the conference.

ACC opponents
Opponent	GP	First	Last	Won	Lost	Tied	Percentage	Streak	Next
Boston College	18	October 18, 1986	October 25, 2025	11	7	–	.611	W2	TBD
California	1	November 8, 2025	November 8, 2025	0	1	–	.000	L1	2027
Clemson	10	October 11, 2014	November 14, 2025	1	9	–	.100	L1	2027
Duke	4	September 7, 2002	October 28, 2023	4	0	–	1.000	W4	2027
Florida State	25	October 4, 1952	October 28, 2023	6	19	–	.240	L2	October 9, 2026
Georgia Tech	4	October 5, 2018	September 21, 2024	2	2	–	.500	W2	November 7, 2026
Miami (Note: Louisville and Miami play for the Schnellenberger Trophy)	18	November 11, 1933	October 17, 2025	5	12	1	.306	W1	2027
NC State	13	November 2, 1951	September 29, 2023	9	4	–	.692	W2	October 3, 2026
North Carolina	8	September 24, 1988	September 9, 2017	5	3	–	.625	W2	November 14, 2026
Pittsburgh	22	October 9, 1976	September 27, 2025	11	11	–	.500	W2	November 21, 2026
SMU	4	September 3, 1983	November 22, 2025	0	4	–	.000	L4	September 19, 2026
Stanford	1	November 16, 2024	November 16, 2024	0	1	–	.000	L1	October 31, 2026
Syracuse	21	October 5, 1985	September 3, 2022	13	8	–	.619	L1	October 17, 2026
Virginia	14	October 15, 1988	October 4, 2025	8	6	–	.571	L1	2027
Virginia Tech	10	September 8, 1979	November 1, 2025	4	6	–	.400	W2	2027
Wake Forest	10	January 2, 2006	October 29, 2022	7	3	–	.700	W1	September 26, 2026
Totals	183			86	96	1	.473	L3	

Records as of the end of the 2025 regular season.

=== All-time record against non-conference rivals ===
Louisville's only active rivalry is with SEC opponent Kentucky. The two teams have played an annual series every year since 1994 except 2020 when the game was cancelled due to the COVID-19 pandemic.

Non-conference Rivalries
Opponent	Rivalry	GP	First	Last	Won	Lost	Tied	Percentage	Streak	Next
Kentucky	Governor's Cup	37	October 28, 1912	November 29, 2025	17	19	–	.472	W2	November 28, 2026
Cincinnati	The Keg of Nails	54	November 4, 1922	December 17, 2022	24	30	1	.445	W3	TBD
Memphis	Louisville–Memphis rivalry	43	September 25, 1948	November 23, 2013	24	19	–	.558	W4	TBD
Totals		133			64	68	1	.485	W1	November 28, 2026

Records as of the end of the 2025 regular season.

== Facilities ==
=== L&N Federal Credit Union Stadium ===
The Louisville Cardinals football team plays its home games at L&N Federal Credit Union Stadium, renamed from Cardinal Stadium in 2023. Prior to that the team played its games at Old Cardinal Stadium. The stadium was constructed with a capacity of 42,000 in 1998 for $63 million. However, the university completed a major expansion and renovation for the 2010 season. The $72 million project, which began in December 2008, features an elevated south-end terrace connecting the east and west sides of the stadium, 33 additional suites, 1,725 additional club seats, a second 100-yard-long club room, and 13,000 more chairback seats, bringing the total capacity to 55,000-plus. The stadium was expanded again in 2018 adding 5,800 seats to bring the stadium to a total capacity of 60,800 seats.

Cardinal Stadium played host to its 20th season of Cardinal football in 2017. Specifically, since 1998, the Cardinals are 70–25 at home. Louisville went undefeated at home in 2001 and 2006 and won a school-record 20 straight home games from 2004 to 2007 (Syracuse snapped the streak with a 38–35 win in 2007). The structure, which sits on the south end of the metropolitan campus, is constructed with the ability for future expansion to more than 80,000 seats.

The Howard Schnellenberger Football Complex which honors the former Cardinal head coach, also sits inside the stadium area and houses the team's coaches, staff, training room, strength and conditioning area and academic services for the student athletes. Schnellenberger initially proposed building the on-campus Cardinal Stadium during his tenure at Louisville and is credited with keeping the project alive.

=== Old Cardinal Stadium ===
Cardinal Stadium is the name of a former college and minor league baseball and college football stadium in Louisville, Kentucky. It is on the grounds of the Kentucky Exposition Center, and was called Fairgrounds Stadium when it first opened its doors to baseball in 1957. Cardinal Stadium was demolished in 2019.

The lone Bluegrass Bowl was held at the stadium in 1958. Cardinal Stadium was home to the Louisville Raiders football team from 1960 through 1962. It was the home to two minor league baseball teams in Louisville: the Louisville Colonels in 1968–1972 and the Louisville Redbirds in 1982–1999. It was to be the home of the American League Kansas City Athletics when their owner Charles O. Finley signed a contract to move the team to Louisville in 1964, but the American League owners voted against the move. The Kentucky Trackers of the AFA played at Cardinal Stadium 1979–1980. It also served as the home of the University of Louisville football team from 1957 to 1997 and their baseball team 1998–2004. It was also used heavily as a high school football stadium, hosting state championship games from in 1964–2002, including hosting all four state championship games played annually 1979–2002. Several local schools also played some games in Cardinal Stadium prior to 1998, including the annual St. Xavier–Trinity rivalry featuring the two major boys Catholic high schools in the city (a game now played at Cardinal Stadium).

=== Trager Center ===
The University of Louisville's Trager Center indoor practice facility just north of Cardinal Stadium, was officially opened on December 1, 2019, and used by the Cardinal football team. The indoor practice facility features a 120-yard FieldTurf field, a 100-meter four-lane sprint track, pole vault and long jump pits, as well as, batting cages for both baseball and softball. It is also equipped for the soccer, field hockey and lacrosse teams to use.

== Rivalries ==
=== Cincinnati ===
Louisville's oldest and most-played football rival is Cincinnati. The Bearcats leads the series at 30–23–1 through the 2022 season. The rivalry started in 1929 with the “Keg of Nails” game between the two teams. Cincinnati won the first 12 meetings between the two teams, before Louisville won its first game against the Bearcats in 1970. The most recent meetings between the Cardinals and Bearcats were two overtime games in 2012 and 2013, both won by Louisville. The annual rivalry has been dormant since 2013; which was long questioned due to the geographical location being only two hours away from each other. The two teams became less competitive in later years, leading to viewers becoming less interested in the rivalry as a whole. However the rivalry was reignited in 2022 in the Fenway Bowl. Fueled by former head coach Scott Satterfield leaving for Cincinnati days before the bowl, Louisville won 24–7 to retain the Keg of Nails. Since Satterfield's hiring, both teams have become more competitive, adding tension to the newly reignited rivalry.

=== Kentucky ===
Louisville's biggest football rival is in-state opponent Kentucky. The football series between the teams was revived in 1994 after the success of the basketball series that restarted in 1983. The series was on a 70-year hiatus with the last game being played in 1924 before the 1994 series. Once the series was renewed, Kentucky had agreed to play Louisville on one condition. The game would be held at the Commonwealth Stadium located in Lexington until the Louisville Cardinals had a stadium that was able to hold at least 40,000 fans. UK leads the all-time series 20–17 but Louisville leads the revived series 17–14 since 1994. Louisville played Kentucky in their first 4 seasons and twice in the 1920s holding the Cardinals scoreless in all contests. Kentucky then left the SIAA in 1922 and joined the Southeastern Conference and has limited its play of state schools since. It would be 70 years before these two schools would face each other again.

In 2013, it was announced that the game would be moved to the final game of the season following Louisville's 2014 move to the ACC. This scheduling change fits with other end of year SEC vs. ACC rivalry games such as Georgia vs. Georgia Tech, Florida vs. Florida State and South Carolina vs. Clemson. Kentucky leads the series 19–17 through the 2025 season.

=== Memphis ===
The football rivalry, which spanned over four different conferences, started in 1948. Louisville leads the series with Memphis at 24–19 through the 2019 season. The most notable match up between the two teams was Louisville's shutout game versus Memphis on October 9, 2010. The Cardinals completely dominated this game, holding the Tigers to 39 rushing yards on 34 carries, recording 235 yards for themselves. Louisville took their second shutout win versus Memphis, with the first being a 62–0 game in 2006. However, not much is to be said of the rivalry today; before the rivalry went dormant in 2013, the Cardinals acquired a 4-game win streak. A once very prevalent rivalry to the Cardinals, the opposition between the two teams faded with time and competition from new teams. There is more than just football rivalries between the two schools; Louisville and Memphis University basketball teams also have an ongoing, intense rivalry that has outlasted the football rivalry.

=== Miami ===
The football rivalry between Louisville and Miami dates back to 1933 and has been played 17 times. The series became a conference rivalry when Louisville joined the ACC in 2014. The programs are connected by head coach Howard Schnellenberger, who resuscitated both schools' football programs and led both teams to great successes when they were struggling and facing financial issues. Schnellenberger coached at the University of Louisville from 1985 to 1994, and coached at the University of Miami from 1979 to 1984. A trophy was introduced to the rivalry in 2023 honoring Howard Schnellenberger, a bronzed pair of boots worn by Schnellenberger awarded to the winner of the game. These western dress boots were donated towards the rivalry from Schnellenbeger's family. Louisville and Miami are now slated to play one another every year to compete for this historical trophy. The Hurricanes lead the all-time series 12–5–1.

== Traditions ==
=== Spirit team ===
==== Cardinal Bird ====
The cardinal was chosen as the mascot in 1913 by Dean John Patterson's wife to reflect the state bird of Kentucky. The suited mascot would not appear until 1953 when cheerleaders first suited up T. Lee Adams for action. Now the Cardinal Bird dubbed Louie appears at most Louisville sporting events and along with the spirit squad leads the crowds in cheers. During some home football games Louie could be seen parachuting into PJCS on occasion and in the stands starting the C-A-R-D-S chant to the crowd. Other duties are to lead the team onto the field at the start of the game and being a part of pregame and halftime marching band shows.

==== Cheerleading and Lady Birds ====
The cheerleading squads are a national powerhouse with the large co-ed squad winning 15 National Cheerleaders Association Collegiate National championships (1985–86, 1989, 1992, 1994, 1996, 1998–99, 2003–05, 2007–09, 2011), the all girl squad winning 9 championships (1998–99, 2001–05, 2009, 2011) and the small co-ed cheerleading squad winning 7 championships (2005–11). The University of Louisville Spirit Groups hold more national titles than any other sport offered at the university. The teams are coached by James Speed, Todd Sharp, Misty Hodges.

The University of Louisville Ladybirds are 20-time national champions winning its seventh national title in 2008, making back-to-back titles for the squad after the win in 2007. In 2004, they successfully defended their crowns from 2002 and 2003 at the National Dance Alliance Collegiate Championship and U of L also won the Universal Dance Association title in 1995 and 1997. The Ladybirds have long been successful, placing in the top five in the national competition 13 of the last 19 years. The group is under the direction of coach Sheryl Knight.

==== The Marching Cards ====
The University of Louisville Cardinal Marching Band is made up of students from UofL and Metroversity students from the Louisville area. The group has been featured on ESPN, ABC World News Tonight, Oprah, Sports Illustrated, Extreme Makeover:Home Edition, just to name a few. The Marching Cards also has various performance groups in the spring semester including a dance band, a brass band and a spirit band. The Marching Cards is the official band to perform "My Old Kentucky Home" each year at the Kentucky Derby since 1938.

=== Card March ===
The University of Louisville football program created its annual Card March tradition prior to all home football contests to help bring fans out to the stadium earlier and to give the football team added inspiration before the game. The tradition began when the team buses would stop on Denny Crum Overpass on Central Ave and walked through the tunnel towards the stadium. Changes arrived in 2013 with the Card March beginning approximately two hours and 15 minutes prior to the announced (example 1:15 p.m. for Sunday's 3:30 p.m. kickoff). The team buses will drop the players off at Floyd Street at the south end of the stadium, which is the entrance to the Bronze D/E lots. After exiting the buses, the team will proceed to enter Gate 4 and then head into the stadium. Fans are encouraged to arrive early and greet the players with the assistance of the UofL marching band, cheerleaders, and Ladybirds. Fans should take note, if there are any bad weather conditions during the scheduled Card March times, that the team will proceed to the back of the Howard Schnellenberger Football Complex and will not travel to the designated Card March location.

=== Johnny Unitas statue ===
The Cardinals stadium houses a statue of former Cardinals quarterback Johnny Unitas. Current Cardinals football players often rub Unitas' statue for good luck before their games.

=== Helmets and logos ===
Louisville has experienced many changes in helmets over the years. Visually presented below is a list from 1960 to the present day. Before 1960 Louisville would use the traditional brown leather helmets until they would wear all white maskless helmets. Louisville jerseys would stay traditionally the same with plain white jersey with red lettering or a red jersey with black lettering. As seen in the picture of Fred Koster vertical stripes was the look for many national teams at the time. With more games being called on the radio the advent of numbers on the helmet and sleeves were made to help identify the players on the field. Sometime in the mid-2000s Louisville added a combination of new uniforms including an all black uniform as an alternative. Recently Louisville and Adidas finalized a contract for roughly $39 million. Since then Adidas and Louisville have paired on many great designs to catch recruits and medias attention. In most recent news Louisville sported an all chrome red helmet against Florida State University on September 17, 2016. A butterfly design was placed on the back of these specific helmets to give tribute to the late Muhammad Ali.

== Individual honors and notable players ==
=== College football awards ===
Year	Award	Player	Position
1999	Johnny Unitas Golden Arm Award	Chris Redman	QB
2005	Ted Hendricks Award	Elvis Dumervil	LB
2005	Bronko Nagurski Award	Elvis Dumervil	LB
2006	Lou Groza Award	Art Carmody	K
2014	Jim Thorpe Award	Gerod Holliman	S
2016	Heisman Trophy	Lamar Jackson	QB
2016	Maxwell Award	Lamar Jackson	QB
2016	Walter Camp Award	Lamar Jackson	QB

=== Retired numbers ===
Louisville Cardinals retired numbers
No.	Player	Pos.	Tenure	No. ret.	Ref.
**8**	Lamar Jackson	QB	2015–2017	2021	
**16**	Johnny Unitas	QB/S	1951–1955	2003	

=== Honored jerseys (Ring of Honor) ===
Louisville has honored the jerseys of 31 former players in their "Ring of Honor". Those numbers remain active and can be chosen by future players.

Louisville Cardinals honored jerseys
No.	Player	Pos.	Tenure
1	Howard Stevens	RB	1969–1972
1	Frank Minnifield	DB	1979–1982
5	Teddy Bridgewater	QB	2011–2013
7	Chris Redman	QB	1995–1999
9	Deion Branch	WR	2000–2001
9	DeVante Parker	WR	2011–2014
10	Dwayne Woodruff	DB, RB	1975–1978
10	Arnold Jackson	WR	1997–2000
11	Jeff Brohm	QB	1990–1993
12	Brian Brohm	QB	2004–2007
13	Sam Madison	DB	1993–1996
15	Dave Ragone	QB	2003–2006
17	Stefan LeFors	QB	2001–2004
19	Michael Bush	RB	2003–2006
24	Anthony Floyd	DB	1999–2002
26	Lenny Lyles	DB, RB	1954–1957
29	Ernest Givins	WR	1984–1985
34	Ray Buchanan	DB	1989–1992
42	Ernie Green	RB	1958–1962
50	Tom Jackson	LB	1970–1972
50	Otis Wilson	LB	1977–1979
52	Tyrus McCloud	LB	1993–1996
56	Doug Buffone	C, LB	1962–1965
56	Otto Knop	C, LB	1949–1952
58	Elvis Dumervil	DE, LB	2002–2005
72	Roman Oben	OT	1992–1995
75	Joe Jacoby	OT	1978–1980
77	Bruce Armstrong	TE, OT	1983–1988
85	Harry Douglas	WR	2003–2007
99	Ted Washington	NT	1987–1990
99	Dewayne White	DL	2000–2002

=== All Americans and notable players ===
Consensus and unanimous first-team All-Americans in bold.

Year	Name	Voter(s)
2016	**Lamar Jackson**	(AP, Walter Camp, Sporting News, AFCA, FWAA, USA Today, Pro Football Focus, Athlon, ESPN, Fox Sports, SI First Teams Heisman Trophy winner)
2014	**Gerod Holliman**	(AP, Walter Camp, Sporting News, AFCA, FWAA, USA Today, CBS, ESPN, Scout, SI First Teams; also Jim Thorpe Award winner)
2013	Marcus Smith	(FWAA 1st Team / Athlons, Walter Camp, USA Today 2nd Team / AP, CBS Sports 3rd Team)
2013	Calvin Pryor	(Athlon's 2nd Team)
2012	Keith Brown	(FOXSports.Net Freshman All-American)
2011	Teddy Bridgewater	(CBSSports.com Freshman All-American; Yahoo! Sports Freshman All-American; Sporting News Freshman All-American; FoxSportsNext Freshman All-American)
2011	Jake Smith	(Football Writers Association of America Freshman All-American)
2010	Hakeem Smith	(Rivals.com First Team; Phil Steele Freshman All-American Second Team)
2010	Johnny Patrick	(Phil Steele Third Team)
2008	Victor Anderson	(Sporting News First Team; collegefootballnews.com Second Team)
2007	Brian Brohm	(Playboy Magazine)
2007	Harry Douglas	(Associated Press Second Team)
2006	Peanut Whitehead	(Sporting News First Team)
2006	Art Carmody	(Associated Press Second Team, Lou Groza Award Winner)
2006	Kurt Quarterman	(Associated Press Third Team)
2006	Latarrius Thomas	(Sporting News Third Team)
2006	Art Carmody	(SI.com Honorable Mention)
2006	Kurt Quarterman	(SI.com Honorable Mention)
2005	**Elvis Dumervil**	(AFCA, Associated Press, Walter Camp, SI.com, collegefootballnews.com First Teams; also Bronko Nagurski Trophy winner)
2005	Abe Brown	(Sporting News, Rivals.com First Team)
2005	Eric Wood	(collegefootballnews Second Team)
2005	Mario Urrutia	(SI.com, Sporting News Honorable Mention)
2005	Rod Council	(Sporting News Honorable Mention)
2004	Travis Leffew	(Associated Press Third Team)
2002	Broderick Clark	(collegefootballnews Second Team)
2001	Bobby Leffew	(Sporting News First Team)
2001	Dewayne White	(collegefootballnews Second Team)
2001	Dewayne White	(Football News, Sporting News Third Teams)
2000	Anthony Floyd	(Walter Camp First Team)
2000	Anthony Floyd	(Football News, Associated Press Second Teams)
2000	Dave Ragone	(Football News Honorable Mention)
2000	Micah Josiah	(Football News Honorable Mention)
1999	Ibn Green	(AFCA First Team)
1999	Ibn Green	(Football News, Sporting News Second Teams)
1999	Chris Redman	(Football News Honorable Mention)
1998	Ibn Green	(Football News, Sporting News Second Teams)
1998	Ibn Green	(Associated Press Third Team)
1996	Sam Madison	(Football News First Team)
1996	Sam Madison	(Gannett News Third Team)
1996	Sam Madison	(Playboy Magazine)
1995	Jamie Asher	(Football News, United Press First Teams)
1995	Roman Oben	(College Sports, Football News Second Teams)
1995	Tyrus McCloud	(Sporting News Second Team)
1995	Sam Madison	(College Sports, Associated Press Third Teams)
1995	Tyrus McCloud	(Associated Press Third Team)
1995	Roman Oben	(Playboy Magazine)
1994	Roman Oben	(Gannett News First Team)
1994	Jamie Asher	(Sporting News Honorable Mention)
1993	Anthony Bridges	(Football News, UPI, Associated Press Second Teams)
1993	Ralph Dawkins	(Football News Honorable Mention)
1993	Joe Johnson	(United Press Honorable Mention)
1992	Ray Buchanan	(Football News Second Team)
1992	Ralph Dawkins	(Football News Honorable Mention)
1992	Ray Buchanan	(Associated Press Honorable Mention)
1991	Ray Buchanan	(Playboy Magazine)
1991	Ray Buchanan	(Associated Press Honorable Mention)
1990	Mark Sander	(Associated Press Third Team)
1989	Mark Sander	(Associated Press Honorable Mention)
1989	Allen Douglas	(Associated Press Honorable Mention)
1988	Ted Washington	(Sporting News Honorable Mention)
1987	Chris Thieneman	(Associated Press Honorable Mention)
1987	Chris Sellers	(Associated Press Honorable Mention)
1985	Matt Battaglia	(Associated Press Honorable Mention)
1979	Otis Wilson	(Sporting News First Team)
1972	Tom Jackson	(Walter Camp First Team)
1972	Howard Stevens	(Walter Camp, Football News, United Press, Associated Press Second Teams)
1972	Tom Jackson	(Associated Press Second Team)
1972	Scott Marcus	(Gridiron News Second Team)
1972	Tom Jackson	(Football News Third Team)
1972	Tom Jackson	(United Press Honorable Mention)
1972	John Madeya	(Associated Press Honorable Mention)
1972	Gary Barnes	(Associated Press Honorable Mention)
1972	Frank Gitschier	(Associated Press Honorable Mention)
1970	Bill Gatti	(Associated Press Honorable Mention)
1963	Ken Kortas	(Dell Sports First Team)
1961	John Finn	(Little America Third Team)
1961	Ernie Green	(Honorable Mention)
1957	Lenny Lyles	(Associated Press First Team)
1957	Ken Kortas	(Playboy Magazine)
1952	Otto Knop	(Little America First Team)
1949	Tom Lucia	(Associated Press First Team)
1948	Bob Bauer	(AP Little America Honorable Mention)
1941	Charles Isenbery	(AP Little America Honorable Mention)
1939	Lou Zimlich	(Little America First Team)
1930	Tom Thompson	(Little America First Team)
1930	Guy Shearer	(Little America Honorable Mention)

== Notable players ==
- David Akers – former Philadelphia Eagles placekicker
- Jaire Alexander – former defensive back for the Green Bay Packers, drafted 18th overall in the 2018 NFL draft.
- Bruce Armstrong – former offensive lineman, notably with the New England Patriots
- Gary Barnidge – former tight end, most notably with the Cleveland Browns
- Mekhi Becton – offensive lineman, Super Bowl LIX champion with the Philadelphia Eagles
- Deion Branch – former wide receiver, 2005 Super Bowl MVP with the New England Patriots
- John Brewer – former fullback
- Teddy Bridgewater – former quarterback, drafted in 2014 by the Minnesota Vikings
- Jeff Brohm – former quarterback with the San Diego Chargers, Washington Redskins, San Francisco 49ers, Tampa Bay Buccaneers, Denver Broncos and Cleveland Browns; now head coach at Louisville
- Doug Buffone – former linebacker, notably with the Chicago Bears
- Curry Burns – former safety, notably with the New Orleans Saints
- Michael Bush – former running back, drafted in 2007 by the Oakland Raiders
- Mark Clayton – former wide receiver, notably with the Miami Dolphins
- Geron Christian – former offensive lineman, was considered to be the team's best offensive lineman from the 2016 and 2017 season, team captain in 2017 season
- Elvis Dumervil – former defensive end, played for the Denver Broncos, Baltimore Ravens, and San Francisco 49ers
- Adam Froman – former quarterback
- William Gay – former cornerback, drafted by the Pittsburgh Steelers in the 2007 NFL draft with the Pittsburgh Steelers
- Breno Giacomini – former offensive tackle drafted by Green Bay Packers played on Super Bowl winner Seattle Seahawks
- Ernest Givins – former wide receiver, notably with the Houston Oilers
- Jay Gruden – former quarterback, six-time ArenaBowl champion, 1992 Arena Football League MVP, Arena Football League hall-of-fame coach, former head coach of the Washington Redskins
- Cole Hikutini – former tight end, played for Louisville in the 2015 and 2016 season after transferring from City of College of San Francisco, on the active roster with the San Francisco 49ers
- Gerod Holliman – former safety; 2014 Jim Thorpe Award recipient
- Arnold Jackson – former wide receiver from 1997 to 2000; broke the NCAA Division I record for career receptions with 300
- Lamar Jackson – quarterback; 2016 Heisman Trophy winner and 2018 ACC Athlete of the Year across all men's sports; drafted 32nd overall in the 2018 NFL draft by the Baltimore Ravens, NFL MVP in 2019 and 2023
- Joe Jacoby – former offensive lineman, notably with the Washington Redskins
- Chris Johnson – former cornerback, with the Baltimore Ravens
- Joe Johnson – former defensive end, notably with the New Orleans Saints and Green Bay Packers
- Stefan LeFors – former quarterback, 2004 AXA Liberty Bowl Offensive MVP, also formerly with the Winnipeg Blue Bombers of the Canadian Football League; now the head high school coach at Parkview Baptist School (Baton Rouge)
- Robert McCune – former linebacker, with the Baltimore Ravens
- Kevin Miller – former wide receiver, notably with the Minnesota Vikings
- Frank Minnifield – former cornerback, notably with the Cleveland Browns
- Frank Moreau – former running back, with the Kansas City Chiefs and Jacksonville Jaguars
- John Neidert – former linebacker, won Super Bowl III with New York Jets
- Roman Oben – former offensive tackle drafted by NY Giants played on Super Bowl winner Tampa Bay Buccaneers
- Amobi Okoye – former defensive tackle drafted by 10th overall by the Houston Texans in 2007, the youngest player in NFL history to be drafted in the first round at 19
- DeVante Parker – former wide receiver with the New England Patriots, first rounder in 2015 to Miami Dolphins
- Will Rabatin – former offensive lineman
- Kerry Rhodes – former safety, with the Arizona Cardinals
- Eric Shelton – former running back, drafted in 2nd round of 2005 draft by the Carolina Panthers
- Tyler Shough – quarterback for the New Orleans Saints
- Kolby Smith – former running back, drafted by the Kansas City Chiefs in the 2007 NFL draft
- Johnny Unitas – Pro Football Hall of Fame quarterback, notably with the Baltimore Colts
- Ted Washington – former defensive tackle, notably with the Buffalo Bills and New England Patriots
- Erik Watts – former quarterback and semi-retired professional wrestler
- Eric Wood – former center, drafted in 2009 in the first round by the Buffalo Bills, color commentator and analyst on the Buffalo Bills Radio Network.
- Dwayne Woodruff – former defensive back, notably with the Pittsburgh Steelers

== Future conference opponents ==
2026 schedule announced December 16, 2025. 2027 Schedule announced September 16, 2026.

2026	2027
Florida State	Clemson
Pittsburgh	North Carolina
SMU	Syracuse
Stanford	Virginia Tech
Wake Forest	at California
at Georgia Tech	at Duke
at North Carolina	at Florida State
at NC State	at Miami (FL)
at Syracuse	at Virginia

== Future non-conference opponents ==
Announced schedules as of December 11, 2025.

2026	2027	2028	2029	2030
at Kentucky	Kentucky	at Kentucky	Kentucky	at Kentucky
vs Ole Miss; Nashville, TN	Richmond	at Texas A&M	Texas A&M	Notre Dame
Villanova	at South Florida	Murray State	VMI	Stephen F. Austin
				South Florida
