= Greggton, Texas =

- Unincorporated community
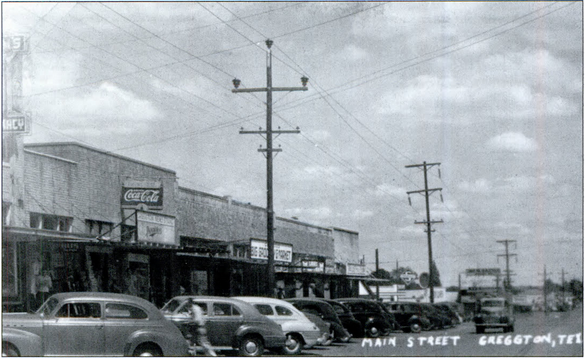
- Main street/U.S. 80 in Greggton, circa 1947

- Location within Texas Location within the United States
- Coordinates: 32°29′54″N 94°47′36″W
- Country: United States
- State: Texas
- County: Gregg
- Elevation: 351 ft (107 m)
- Time zone: UTC-6 (Central (CST))
  - Summer (DST): UTC-5 (CDT)
- Area codes: 430 & 903

Greggton was an unincorporated community in Gregg County, located in the U.S. state of Texas. The community was originally founded in 1873 under the name "Willow Springs" as a stop on the Texas and Pacific Railway. Greggton's main thoroughfare would be designated as part of U.S. Highway 80 upon its establishment in 1926.

The East Texas Oil Boom of the early 1930s saw the town grow. A post office was established in November 1932 and the name changed to "Greggton" around the same time. In 1920, the town had a population of 180. By 1936, the population had grown to 1,500 with 125 businesses and by 1949, the population had grown to 2,350. By the 1950s, the town had its own movie theater called "The Ritz"

The town was annexed to Longview in December 1959, with postal services transferred on May 31, 1960.

Today, the Pine Tree Independent School District serves the parts of Longview that were once Greggton.
