= Pine Tree Independent School District =

School district in Texas

Coordinates: 32.5243°N 94.8045°W

Location
- Longview, Gregg County, Texas; United States

District information
- Type: Independent School District
- Motto: "A Tradition of Excellence"
- Grades: PK–12
- Superintendent: Steven Clugston
- Enrollment: 4,424

Other information
- Website: www.ptisd.org

Pine Tree Independent School District is a public independent school district (ISD) based in Longview, Texas, United States. Pine Tree ISD serves western portions of Longview, including areas that were once Greggton, and a small section of the neighboring city of White Oak.

In 2018, the school district received a "met standard" rating for the district, Primary, Parkway Elementary, Birch Elementary, Middle School, Junior High, High School, and ExCEL (alternative). Distinction designations included Pine Tree High School for Academic Achievement in Science, and Parkway Elementary for Academic Achievement in ELA/Reading and Academic Achievement in Mathematics.

== Schools ==
- Pine Tree High School (grades 9–12)
- Pine Tree ExCEL High School (grades 9–12)
- Pine Tree Junior High School (grades 7–8)
- Pine Tree Middle School (grades 5–6)
- Pine Tree Birch Elementary School (grades 1–4)
- Pine Tree Parkway Elementary School (grades 1–4)
- Pine Tree Primary School (prekindergarten-kindergarten)
- PACE Discipline Alternative Campus

== Mascot and colors ==
The district's mascot is Pete the Pirate. Its school colors are blue and gold.

== History ==
Pine Tree, Texas, was first settled in the mid-1840s. The school was operating in the community in the 1850s. Growth was slow but stable, with agriculture being the primary source of income through the turn of the century. By the early 1940s, Pine Tree was an election precinct and a school district. After World War II, Pine Tree became part of Longview.
