= Pine Tree High School =

Coordinates: 32.514327°N 94.7824°W

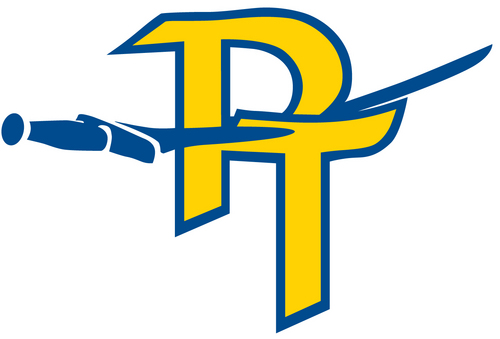

Location
- 1005 West Fairmont Street; Longview, Texas 75604; United States

Information
- School type: Public high school
- Motto: "A Tradition Of Excellence for All"
- Established: 1847
- School district: Pine Tree Independent School District
- Principal: Bryan Kraus
- Grades: 9-12
- Enrollment: 1,259 (23-24)
- Campus: Suburban
- Colors: Royal Blue & Gold
- Athletics conference: UIL 4A
- Mascot: Pirate
- Newspaper: The Cutlass
- Yearbook: The Buccaneer
- Mascot Name: Petey the Pirate
- Website: Pine Tree High School

Pine Tree High School is a suburban public high school located in the city of Longview, Texas, in Gregg County, United States and classified as a 4A school by the University Interscholastic League (UIL). It is a part of the Pine Tree Independent School District located in west central Gregg County. In 2013, the school was rated "Met Standard" by the Texas Education Agency.

== History ==
The Pine Tree ISD was established in 1847. Pine Tree High School was originally a boarding school for the region, and people came for miles to attend. It was a part of Pine Tree, Texas which was incorporated into Longview in the 1870s. Being founded in 1847, it is the 57th oldest public high school in America. Growth was slow but stable, with agriculture being the primary source of income through the turn of the century. The oil boom in 1931 brought thousands of people to East Texas and caused rapid growth for Pine Tree Schools.

Alma Mater

Pirates fight for old Pine Tree High
For our Alma Mater dear
Pirates fight for Old Pine Tree High,
For Victory is near.

To Pine Tree we’ll be loyal
‘Til the sun drops from the sky
Remembering until the end,
Pirates fight, never die!

Fight Song
written by Mickey Wright
to the tune of "You're a Grand Old Flag"

Pirates fight, fight, fight
Give 'em all of your might
Pirates fight for the old blue and gold.

The Pirates are
The best by far,
Daring, Courageous, and Bold.
Hey! Hey!

Pirates go, go, go
Till you conquer your foe
Pirates fight and they never die

So now we fight for victory,
For that good old Pine Tree High.

== Student demographics ==
As of the 2009-2010 school year, Pine Tree High had a total of 1,324 students (58.9% White, 19.2% Hispanic, 19.1% African American, 1.7% Asian/Pacific Islander, and 1.1% Native American). 39% of the students are considered economically disadvantaged. 44% of students are considered at risk and 3.4% are considered to have limited English proficiency. Pine Tree High School is 27.5% freshmen, 24.2% sophomores, 22.4% juniors, and 25.8% seniors.

The drop-out rate as of 2010 was 3.1 for grades 9-12. 92.8% of students completed high school.

== Academics ==
As of the 2011-2012 school year, Pine Tree High School performed similarly to other Texas schools regarding their TAKS scores. 94% passed Reading ELA, 87% passed Math, 88% passed Science, 97% passed Social Studies, and overall 80% passed each test. Regarding Commended TAKS Scores, 26% were commended in Reading ELA, 22% were commended in Math, 21% were commended in Science, 49% were commended in Social Studies, and overall 10% were commended in each test.

30.4% of students graduated on the minimum plan, 69.6% of students graduated on the recommended plan, and 14% of students graduated on the special education plan, including the distinguished plan. 15.4% of students took AP tests with 70.8% of students being at or above AP criteria. 26% of students engaged in advanced courses or dual enrollment. The average ACT score of a Pine Tree student is 22.1, compared to the state average of 20.5. The average SAT score out on a 1600 scale is 1089, compared to the state average of 985.

State Titles

- Academic Champions
  - 1996-97(4A)

== Athletics ==
The Pine Tree Pirates compete in these sports: Volleyball, Cross Country, Football, Basketball, Swimming, Powerlifting, Soccer, Golf, Tennis, Track, Baseball & Softball. As of 2014, with the addition of a 6A, Pine Tree moved up to 5A in UIL.

The Pine Tree Pirates were so named by their first coach, as he was a fan of the Pittsburgh Pirates.
State Titles

- Boys Basketball
  - 1973(3A)
- Boys Golf
  - 1951(B), 1952(B), 1953(B), 1955(1A)

== Facilities ==
As one of four public school districts serving Longview, Texas, Pine Tree High School is located in Gregg County, on Interstate 20 between Shreveport, LA and Dallas, TX. The High School has seen additions and major renovation to house grades 9-12 in the year 2008, and The Pirate Center: a Multi-Purpose Building which opened in the Spring of 2008. A new stadium located near campuses off Loop 281 near Pine Tree Parkway, opened in the fall of 2013.

== Theater ==
- One Act Play
  - 1952(B), 1975(3A), 2005(4A)

== Notable alumni ==
- Chris Johnson, NFL player for the Baltimore Ravens
- Clint Ford, voice actor and novelist, class of 1994
- Rodney Carrington, comedian and musician
- Robert Morris, founding pastor of Gateway Church (Texas)

== Awards ==
Pine Tree High School is a two-time National Blue Ribbon School award winner, in 1988-89 and again in 1992-93.
