= Louisville–Memphis rivalry =

American college multi-sports rivalry

Locations of Louisville and Memphis

The Louisville–Memphis rivalry is a sports rivalry between the University of Louisville Cardinals and University of Memphis Tigers. The two NCAA Division I schools compete in various sports, with men's basketball and college football in particular being prominent. Both schools were represented in a 2008 Sheraton commercial featuring fans of other college sport rivals such as Michigan/Ohio State, Duke/North Carolina, USC/UCLA, and Syracuse/Georgetown.

== Men's basketball ==
Louisville–Memphis basketball rivalry
- Louisville Cardinals Memphis Tigers
- Sport: College basketball
- First meeting: January 6, 1949; Louisville 72 – Memphis 53
- Latest meeting: November 15, 2026; Memphis 98 – Louisville 78
- Next meeting: 2027

Statistics
- Total meetings: 92
- All-time series: Louisville leads, 55–37
- Longest win streak: Louisville, 7 (1964–1970)
- Current win streak: Memphis, 1 (2026–present)

The series between the men's basketball programs began in 1949. Louisville leads the series 55–36. The two schools have played in four different conferences – the Missouri Valley Conference, Metro Conference, Conference USA, and for the 2013–14 season only, the American Athletic Conference. Louisville joined the Atlantic Coast Conference in 2014.

In May 2025, the two schools announced a 6-game series starting in 2025, marking the renewal of the basketball rivalry.

Louisville victories	Memphis victories

No.	Date	Location	Winner	Score
1	January 6, 1949	Memphis, TN	Louisville	72–53
2	December 7, 1949	Louisville, KY	Louisville	79–58
3	January 6, 1951	Memphis, TN	Louisville	51–48
4	January 13, 1951	Louisville, KY	Louisville	67–58
5	January 18, 1956	Louisville, KY	#10 Louisville	85–75
6	January 9, 1957	Louisville, KY	#5 Louisville	93–71
7	February 2, 1957	Memphis, TN	Memphis State	81–78
8	February 11, 1963	Memphis, TN	Memphis State	76–55
9	January 4, 1964	Louisville, KY	Louisville	69–57
10	January 10, 1968	Memphis, TN	Louisville	78–58
11	February 26, 1968	Louisville, KY	#19 Louisville	76–52
12	December 18, 1968	Louisville, KY	Louisville	67–66
13	February 6, 1969	Memphis, TN	Louisville	60–51
14	February 4, 1970	Louisville, KY	#19 Louisville	77–48
15	March 4, 1970	Louisville, KY	Louisville	77–44
16	January 9, 1971	Memphis, TN	Memphis State	78–75
17	March 6, 1971	Louisville, KY	Louisville	102–73
18	February 2, 1972	Louisville, KY	Memphis State	77–69
19	March 2, 1972	Memphis, TN	Memphis State	80–65
20	March 11, 1972	Memphis, TN	Louisville	83–72
21	January 25, 1973	Memphis, TN	#17 Memphis State	81–76
22	February 8, 1973	Louisville, KY	Louisville	83–69
23	January 19, 1974	Louisville, KY	#16 Louisville	94–81
24	February 14, 1974	Memphis, TN	Memphis State	78–71
25	March 4, 1975	Louisville, KY	#3 Louisville	85–79
26	November 29, 1975	Memphis, TN	#8 Louisville	79–75
27	March 5, 1976	Louisville, KY	Memphis State	87–76
28	February 5, 1977	Louisville, KY	#9 Louisville	111–92
29	February 19, 1977	Memphis, TN	#8 Memphis State	87–77
30	January 3, 1978	Memphis, TN	#10 Louisville	78–75
31	February 25, 1978	Louisville, KY	#20 Louisville	115–97
32	March 3, 1978	Cincinnati, OH	#20 Louisville	67–62
33	February 5, 1979	Louisville, KY	#6 Louisville	103–82
34	February 17, 1979	St. Louis, MO	Memphis State	60–53
35	January 12, 1980	Memphis, TN	#11 Louisville	69–48
36	February 4, 1980	Louisville, KY	#7 Louisville	88–60
37	February 29, 1980	Louisville, KY	#4 Louisville	84–65
38	January 22, 1981	Memphis, TN	Memphis State	60–55^{OT}
39	February 16, 1981	Louisville, KY	Louisville	95–65
40	February 6, 1982	Memphis, TN	Memphis State	74–65^{OT}
41	February 22, 1982	Louisville, KY	Louisville	65–61
42	March 7, 1982	Memphis, TN	Memphis State	73–62
43	February 19, 1983	Memphis, TN	#9 Louisville	75–66
44	March 6, 1983	Louisville, KY	#3 Louisville	64–62^{OT}
45	March 12, 1983	Cincinnati, OH	#3 Louisville	71–68
46	February 18, 1984	Memphis, TN	Louisville	85–78
47	March 3, 1984	Louisville, KY	Louisville	68–58

No.	Date	Location	Winner	Score
48	January 19, 1985	Louisville, KY	#5 Memphis State	69–66
49	March 2, 1985	Memphis, TN	#4 Memphis State	66–59
50	March 8, 1985	Louisville, KY	#5 Memphis State	81–74
51	January 9, 1986	Memphis, TN	Memphis State	73–71
52	March 2, 1986	Louisville, KY	#13 Louisville	70–69
53	March 9, 1986	Louisville, KY	#11 Louisville	88–79
54	January 28, 1987	Louisville, KY	Memphis State	64–48
55	February 22, 1987	Memphis, TN	Memphis State	58–57
56	March 8, 1987	Louisville, KY	Memphis State	75–52
57	January 30, 1988	Memphis, TN	Memphis State	72–68
58	February 29, 1988	Louisville, KY	Louisville	71–69
59	March 13, 1988	Memphis, TN	Louisville	81–73
60	February 4, 1989	Memphis, TN	#7 Louisville	101–85
61	February 20, 1989	Louisville, KY	Memphis State	72–67
62	March 11, 1989	Columbia, SC	#16 Louisville	71–70
63	January 20, 1990	Louisville, KY	#10 Louisville	86–69
64	February 20, 1990	Memphis, TN	Memphis State	82–68
65	March 9, 1990	Biloxi, MS.	#18 Louisville	76–73
66	January 10, 1991	Louisville, KY	Memphis State	65–56
67	February 16, 1991	Memphis, TN	Memphis State	91–73
68	March 8, 1991	Roanoke, VA	Louisville	72–70
69	March 17, 1995	Austin, TX	Memphis	77–56
70	February 3, 1996	Louisville, KY	Louisville	74–56
71	February 25, 1996	Memphis, TN	#19 Memphis	57–54
72	January 23, 1997	Louisville, KY	Memphis	64–58
73	February 9, 1997	Memphis, TN	Memphis	79–59
74	February 21, 1998	Memphis, TN	Memphis	93–75
75	February 4, 1999	Louisville, KY	Louisville	89–76
76	February 5, 2000	Memphis, TN	Louisville	74–59
77	March 3, 2001	Louisville, KY	Louisville	65–56
78	January 30, 2002	Memphis, TN	Memphis	80–70
79	February 19, 2003	Louisville, KY	Memphis	80–73
80	March 14, 2003	Louisville, KY	Louisville	78–75
81	February 4, 2004	Memphis, TN	Memphis	62–58
82	February 28, 2004	Louisville, KY	Louisville	66–60
83	February 9, 2005	Louisville, KY	Memphis	85–68
84	February 26, 2005	Memphis, TN	#11 Louisville	53–44
85	March 12, 2005	Memphis, TN	#6 Louisville	75–74
86	December 17, 2011	Louisville, KY	#4 Louisville	95–87
87	December 15, 2012	Memphis, TN	#6 Louisville	87–78
88	January 9, 2014	Louisville, KY	#24 Memphis	73–67
89	March 1, 2014	Memphis, TN	#21 Memphis	72–66
90	December 16, 2017	New York, NY	Louisville	81–72
91	December 13, 2025	Louisville, KY	#11 Louisville	99–73
92	November 15, 2026	Memphis, TN	Memphis	98–78
Series: Louisville leads 55–37

== Football ==
Louisville–Memphis football rivalry
- Louisville Cardinals Memphis Tigers
- First meeting: September 25, 1948; Memphis State, 13–7
- Latest meeting: November 23, 2013; Louisville, 24–17

Statistics
- Total meetings: 43
- All-time series: Louisville leads, 24–19
- Largest victory: Louisville, 56–0 (2010)
- Longest win streak: Memphis State, 8 (1948–1969)
- Current win streak: Louisville, 4 (2004–present)

The football series was first played in 1948 when Memphis State won 13–7 and has been played a total of 43 times. The teams played again in 1952, before starting a series in 1961 that played annually through 1983. The annual series resumed in 1986 and played every year but one through 2004. The two teams met three more times with their final meeting in 2013. Louisville leads the series 24–19.

Louisville victories	Memphis victories

No.	Date	Location	Winner	Score
1	September 25, 1948	Memphis, TN	Memphis State	13–7
2	November 8, 1952	Memphis, TN	Memphis State	29–25
3	October 7, 1961	Louisville, KY	Memphis State	28–13
4	October 6, 1962	Memphis, TN	Memphis State	49–0
5	November 2, 1963	Louisville, KY	Memphis State	25–0
6	November 14, 1964	Memphis, TN	Memphis State	34–0
7	November 30, 1968	Louisville, KY	Memphis State	44–14
8	November 22, 1969	Memphis, TN	Memphis State	69–19
9	November 7, 1970	Louisville, KY	Louisville	40–27
10	October 9, 1971	Memphis, TN	Louisville	26–20
11	November 18, 1972	Louisville, KY	Louisville	17–0
12	September 8, 1973	Memphis, TN	Memphis State	28–21
13	September 7, 1974	Louisville, KY	Memphis State	16–10
14	October 18, 1975	Memphis, TN	Memphis State	41–7
15	November 13, 1976	Louisville, KY	Memphis State	26–14
16	October 1, 1977	Memphis, TN	Louisville	14–13
17	November 11, 1978	Louisville, KY	Memphis State	29–22
18	November 10, 1979	Memphis, TN	Memphis State	10–6
19	October 11, 1980	Louisville, KY	Louisville	38–14
20	October 10, 1981	Memphis, TN	Louisville	14–7
21	November 20, 1982	Memphis, TN	Louisville	38–19
22	November 24, 1983	Louisville, KY	Memphis State	45–7

No.	Date	Location	Winner	Score
23	September 27, 1986	Louisville, KY	Louisville	34–8
24	November 14, 1987	Memphis, TN	Memphis State	43–8
25	September 17, 1988	Louisville, KY	Louisville	29–18
26	November 11, 1989	Memphis, TN	Louisville	40–10
27	October 13, 1990	Louisville, KY	Louisville	19–17
28	November 9, 1991	Memphis, TN	Memphis State	35–7
29	September 12, 1992	Louisville, KY	Louisville	16–15
30	September 11, 1993	Memphis, TN	Louisville	54–28
31	October 29, 1994	Louisville, KY	Louisville	10–6
32	September 30, 1995	Memphis, TN	Louisville	17–7
33	November 2, 1996	Louisville, KY	Louisville	13–10
34	November 15, 1997	Memphis, TN	Memphis	21–20
35	October 24, 1998	Louisville, KY	Louisville	35–32
36	October 16, 1999	Memphis, TN	Louisville	32–31
37	September 29, 2001	Louisville, KY	Louisville	38–21
38	October 8, 2002	Memphis, TN	Louisville	38–32
39	November 15, 2003	Louisville, KY	Memphis	37–7
40	November 4, 2004	Memphis, TN	#14 Louisville	56–49
41	October 10, 2008	Memphis, TN	Louisville	35–28
42	October 9, 2010	Louisville, KY	Louisville	56–0
43	November 23, 2013	Louisville, KY	#21 Louisville	24–17
Series: Louisville leads 24–19

== See also ==
- List of NCAA college football rivalry games
