= John L. Smith =

American football player and coach (born 1948)

Biographical details
- Born: November 15, 1948 (age 77); Idaho Falls, Idaho, U.S.

Playing career
- 1968–1970: Weber State
- Positions: Linebacker, quarterback

Coaching career (HC unless noted)
- 1971: Weber State (GA)
- 1972–1976: Montana (assistant)
- 1977–1981: Nevada (DC)
- 1982–1985: Idaho (DC)
- 1986: Wyoming (DC)
- 1987–1988: Washington State (DC)
- 1989–1994: Idaho
- 1995–1997: Utah State
- 1998–2002: Louisville
- 2003–2006: Michigan State
- 2009–2011: Arkansas (ST)
- 2012: Arkansas
- 2013–2015: Fort Lewis
- 2016–2018: Kentucky State

Head coaching record
- Overall: 157–137
- Bowls: 1–6
- Tournaments: 3–5 (NCAA D-I-AA playoffs)

Accomplishments and honors

Championships
- 2 Big Sky (1989, 1992); 2 Big West (1996–1997); 2 Conference USA (2000–2001)

Awards
- Idaho Athletics Hall of Fame (2001); 2× C-USA Coach of the Year (2000, 2001); Big Ten Coach of the Year (2003)

John Lawrence Smith (born November 15, 1948) is an American college football coach. He was the head football coach at Kentucky State University in Frankfort, Kentucky, a position he held from 2016 until he was fired by the university in 2018.

Smith was previously the head football coach at the University of Idaho (1989–1994), Utah State University (1995–1997), the University of Louisville (1998–2002), Michigan State University (2003–2006), University of Arkansas (2012), and Fort Lewis College in Colorado (2013–2016). He had been named head coach of his alma mater, Weber State University, after the 2011 season, but left after spring drills to take over at Arkansas following the firing of Bobby Petrino in April 2012. Smith has also been an assistant at multiple programs, most recently at Arkansas under Petrino, where he was in charge of special teams from 2009 to 2011.

== Early life ==
Born in Idaho Falls in eastern Idaho and raised in nearby Iona, Smith lettered in football, basketball, and track for the Bees at Bonneville High School, and graduated in 1967. He played college football at Weber State College in Ogden, Utah, as both a linebacker and quarterback for the Wildcats in the Big Sky, then a college division conference for football. Smith was a member of the Tau Kappa Epsilon fraternity and graduated in 1971 with a bachelor's degree in physical education.

== Coaching career ==
=== Early coaching career ===
Smith began his coaching career in 1971 as a graduate assistant at his alma mater, Weber State. For the next 17 seasons, Smith was an assistant coach, first at Montana for five seasons (1972–76) and then at Nevada (1977–81) for five more as the defensive coordinator. He then joined Dennis Erickson as defensive coordinator and assistant head coach for seven seasons at three schools: Idaho (1982–85), Wyoming (1986), and Washington State (1987–88).

The middle initial "L" became part of his public moniker in 1982, due to another John Smith at Idaho, John G. Smith (1924–1998). On the UI athletic staff since 1965, the elder Smith was the equipment manager at the time; he was the last head baseball coach (1967−1980) and a former assistant coach in football and basketball.

=== Idaho ===
After serving as an assistant head coach under Erickson for seven seasons, Smith began his head coaching career in 1989 back at Idaho, where he posted a 53–21 (.716) record in six seasons. Under his leadership, the Vandals won two Big Sky championships and made the 16-team NCAA Division I-AA playoffs five times, advancing to the national semifinals in 1993. Smith's 53 wins remain the most in school history, seventeen clear of runner-up Erickson (36 in five years). His starting salary at Idaho was under $60,000, but after two seasons he became the first UI coach to be granted a multi-year contract, with a four-year deal in January 1991.

Smith inherited an 11–2 team from Keith Gilbertson that had made the I-AA semifinals in 1988, and returned All-American quarterback in John Friesz. Despite losing the first two games of the 1989 season to Washington State and Portland State, Idaho went undefeated (8–0) in conference play, the only time in school history; the Vandals lost in the first round of the I-AA playoffs and finished at 9–3. Friesz won the Walter Payton Award, was drafted by the San Diego Chargers, and spent a decade in the National Football League (NFL). Smith's next Vandal quarterback was southpaw Doug Nussmeier, who threw for over 10,000 yards and won the Walter Payton Award in 1993; he was drafted in the fourth round by the New Orleans Saints.

=== Utah State ===
In January 1995, Smith left Moscow to move up to Division I-A at Utah State in the Big West, with a five-year contract exceeding $100,000 per year. He stayed in Logan with the Aggies for three seasons (16–18, .470). Although Smith took another job in late November, he coached the 1997 Aggies in the first Humanitarian Bowl on December 29, a 35–19 loss to Cincinnati.

=== Louisville ===
On November 24, 1997, Louisville hired Smith as head coach with a five-year contract at $375,000 per year. Inheriting a one-win team from 1997, the Cardinals improved to 7–5 in 1998 and were 41–21 (.661) through 2002, with five straight bowl appearances and consecutive Conference USA titles in 2000 and 2001. Under Smith's tutelage, quarterback Dave Ragone was a three-time conference player of the year (2000–02).

On December 19, 2002, Smith accepted the head coaching job at Michigan State. He informed his Louisville players of the decision at halftime of the GMAC Bowl, which ended with a 38–15 loss to Marshall.

=== Michigan State ===
==== 2003 ====
After opening his first season at Michigan State in 2003 with wins over Western Michigan and Rutgers, Smith's team was unable to hold off a series of late game drives by WAC member Louisiana Tech, losing a 20–19 decision. The Spartans ended the regular season 8–4, and were then defeated by Nebraska, 17–3, in the 2003 Alamo Bowl, a game which also featured the injury of the Spartans' anticipated star quarterback Drew Stanton while he was playing on special teams. Smith was named the Big Ten Conference Coach of the Year in 2003.

==== 2004 ====
The second game of the 2004 season was the second of a "home-and-home" series against Rutgers, which the Spartans lost in New Jersey, 19–14. The Spartans also lost to Notre Dame and dropped a three-overtime game against rival Michigan, but beat a top-10 ranked Wisconsin team, 49–14. The Spartans lost their final two games that season and did not receive a bowl invitation—the first time a Smith-coached team hadn't gone to a bowl since 1997.

==== 2005 ====
Michigan State began the 2005 season with a 4–0 record in non-conference play including an overtime win against Notre Dame in South Bend. However, the Spartans only won two games in the Big Ten and were again unable to beat Michigan, losing 34–31 in the second straight overtime game between the two rivals.

One of the most significant games of the season was against Ohio State. The Spartans had a brief 17–7 lead in the second quarter. With 24 seconds and no time outs remaining in the first half, Michigan State faced a second down and 12 yards to go at the Ohio State 17 yard-line. Michigan State tried a running play resulting in no gain. Facing third down, Michigan State likely could have easily spiked the ball to stop the clock. However, with the clock running, it was perceived by many fans and sports commentators that chaos reigned on the MSU sideline. The confusion resulted in Michigan State lining up on the field with only ten players. The ensuing field goal attempt was blocked, and returned by Ohio State for a touchdown to cut the lead to 17–14. In half-time comments on ABC by Jack Arute, Smith, while raising his voice, blamed the coaching staff remarking, "That's a dang coaching mistake...the kids are playing their tail off, and the coaches are screwing it up!"

Michigan State finished the season 5–6, and did not receive a bowl bid for the second straight year.

==== 2006 ====
Michigan State began 2006 with three wins and then suffered an infamous late-game loss against Notre Dame. The Spartans led 37–21 midway through the fourth quarter, but, despite a raging thunderstorm, the Irish rallied for a 40–37 victory. This led to a now-famous video of John L. Smith slapping himself at the post-game press conference.

The following week, Michigan State's homecoming game, the Spartans were defeated 23–20 by an Illinois team that had not won a Big Ten game since 2004. After the game, players from both teams fought at midfield after several Illinois players tried to plant their flag at midfield of Spartan Stadium. In the post-game press conference, Smith admitted the coaches were having trouble motivating the players. Smith also slapped himself in the face as a reference to a claim by Notre Dame head coach Charlie Weis who stated that he had been hit in the face during a sideline scrum earlier that season when his Fighting Irish played Michigan State.

Following another defeat to Michigan, Michigan State hosted and lost 38–7 to top-ranked Ohio State. At halftime, Spartan Stadium had mostly emptied, with a large portion of the remaining attendees being Ohio State fans.

MSU followed up those losses with a 41–38 win at Northwestern. The Spartans, down 38–3 in the middle of the third quarter, rallied for 38 unanswered points for the largest comeback in NCAA history. The Spartans then fell to Indiana the following week.

On November 1, Michigan State decided not to retain John L. Smith, and the remainder of his contract was bought out for $1.5 million. Smith and his coaching staff stayed on the job through the end of the 2006 season. Michigan State finished 4–8 (1–7 in the Big Ten). Smith was replaced by Mark Dantonio, previously the head coach of Cincinnati on November 27. Smith had a record of 22–26 (.458) in his four seasons at Michigan State.

Smith has compiled a record of 132–86 (.605) in his 18 years as a college head coach. 12 of his 18 teams have participated in postseason play, including seven straight from 1997 to 2003. Smith is one of 18 head coaches in college football history to take three different teams to bowl games. A defensive coach for most of his career, Smith is also known as one of the disciples of the spread offense, learned from Dennis Erickson, which he introduced at Michigan State.

=== Return to coaching: Arkansas ===
After two years of broadcasting, Smith returned to the sidelines in 2009 as the special teams coach at the University of Arkansas under head coach Bobby Petrino, his former assistant.

=== Weber State ===
Following his third year as an assistant at Arkansas in 2011, Smith left in December to lead his fifth Division I program at Weber State, his alma mater, an FCS program in the Big Sky Conference. He succeeded Ron McBride, who retired after seven seasons with the Wildcats. Smith coached the Wildcats through spring drills in April, but left days later to replace Petrino at Arkansas, who had been recently fired.

=== Arkansas ===
On April 10, 2012, the University of Arkansas fired head coach Bobby Petrino. Almost immediately, there was considerable media speculation that Smith would return to Arkansas, and replace Petrino. This was confirmed less than two weeks after the firing of Petrino, when multiple media outlets reported that Smith would indeed return to Arkansas. He was introduced as Arkansas' 29th full-time head coach the next day. The event was a reversal of roles as it was now Smith replacing Petrino as head coach; Petrino succeeded Smith at Louisville following Smith's departure in 2003. Smith signed a 10-month contract, leading to speculation that he was only taking the post on an interim basis for the 2012 season. The Razorbacks' formal announcement described him as "head coach", without any qualifiers; however, it also indicated that Smith's hiring would allow Arkansas to hire "a head coach for the future of the program" in a more appropriate timeframe following the 2012 season.

Coming off only the second 11-win season in school history, expectations were very high for the Razorbacks despite the acrimonious nature of Petrino's firing. However, they never recovered from a 1–4 September, and ultimately finished 4–8. On November 24, the university announced that Smith would not be retained as head coach, but would serve as a consultant to the team until his contract ran out in February 2013.

=== Fort Lewis ===
On January 16, 2013, Smith was introduced as the head coach at Fort Lewis College, a Division II team in Durango, Colorado. He took over a Skyhawks program that was 0–10 in 2012, last in the Rocky Mountain Athletic Conference (RMAC). In his three years at the helm, the Skyhawks went 14–19 (.424) overall and 11–16 (.407) in the Rocky Mountain Athletic Conference.

Fort Lewis notched seven wins in 2015, including six in conference games (7–4, 6–3 RMAC). The last time the Skyhawks notched seven wins in a season was 2006, during Ed Rifilato's first stint as the head coach. All four losses in 2015 came at the hands of nationally ranked teams.

=== Kentucky State ===
On December 7, 2015, it was announced that Smith had been hired as the head coach at Kentucky State University in Frankfort, a member of the Southern Intercollegiate Athletic Conference (SIAC) in Division II.

== Personal life, family, and honors ==
Smith is married with three children. He is the uncle of former NFL quarterback Alex Smith.

Smith has earned a reputation for his attitude and actions, including para-gliding with his children in Zermatt, Switzerland, climbing 19,340-foot Mount Kilimanjaro in Africa, flying in a T-38 Talon jet trainer in Texas at Randolph Air Force Base, skydiving from 14,000 feet over Greensburg, Indiana, and running with the bulls in Pamplona, Spain.

In 2000 Sports Illustrated recognized Smith as one of Idaho's top 100 athletes of the 20th century. He was later inducted into the Idaho Athletics Hall of Fame in 2001.

Smith filed for Chapter 7 bankruptcy protection on September 6, 2012. Smith said he began land investments when he was coach at Louisville from 1998 to 2002, and that he and other investors lost money when the real estate market softened.

== Head coaching record ==
Year	Team	Overall	Conference	Standing	Bowl/playoffs	NCAA/TSN/Coaches^{#}	AP^{°}
Idaho Vandals (Big Sky Conference) (1989–1994)
1989	Idaho	9–3	8–0	1st	L NCAA Division I-AA First Round	T–4	
1990	Idaho	9–4	6–2	2nd	L NCAA Division I-AA Quarterfinal	13	
1991	Idaho	6–5	4–4	T–4th			
1992	Idaho	9–3	6–1	T–1st	L NCAA Division I-AA First Round	5	
1993	Idaho	11–3	5–2	T–2nd	L NCAA Division I-AA Semifinal	11	
1994	Idaho	9–3	5–2	T–2nd	L NCAA Division I-AA First Round	6	
Idaho:		53–21	34–11				
Utah State Aggies (Big West Conference) (1995–1997)
1995	Utah State	4–7	4–2	T–2nd			
1996	Utah State	6–5	4–1	T–1st			
1997	Utah State	6–6	4–1	T–1st	L Humanitarian		
Utah State:		16–18	12–4				
Louisville Cardinals (Conference USA) (1998–2002)
1998	Louisville	7–5	4–2	3rd	L Motor City		
1999	Louisville	7–5	4–2	T–2nd	L Humanitarian		
2000	Louisville	9–3	6–1	1st	L Liberty		
2001	Louisville	11–2	6–1	1st	W Liberty	16	17
2002	Louisville	7–6	5–3	3rd	L GMAC		
Louisville:		41–21	25–9				
Michigan State Spartans (Big Ten Conference) (2003–2006)
2003	Michigan State	8–5	5–3	T–4th	L Alamo		
2004	Michigan State	5–7	4–4	T–5th			
2005	Michigan State	5–6	2–6	9th			
2006	Michigan State	4–8	1–7	T–10th			
Michigan State:		22–26	12–20				
Arkansas Razorbacks (Southeastern Conference) (2012)
2012	Arkansas	4–8	2–6	6th (Western)			
Arkansas:		4–8	2–6				
Fort Lewis Skyhawks (Rocky Mountain Athletic Conference) (2013–2015)
2013	Fort Lewis	4–7	3–6	T–7th			
2014	Fort Lewis	3–8	2–7	T–9th			
2015	Fort Lewis	7–4	6–3	T–3rd			
Fort Lewis:		14–19	11–16				
Kentucky State Thorobreds (Southern Intercollegiate Athletic Conference) (2016–2018)
2016	Kentucky State	4–7	4–3	2nd (West)			
2017	Kentucky State	3–7	2–4	3rd (West)			
2018	Kentucky State	0–10	0–6	5th (West)			
Kentucky State:		7–24	6–12				
Total:		157–137					
National championship Conference title Conference division title or championship game berth
^{#}Rankings from final NCAA Division I-AA Football Committee poll from 1989 to 1992, The Sports Network poll from 1993 to 1994, and Coaches Poll in 2001.; ^{°}Rankings from final AP poll.
