= Curry Burns =

American football player (born 1981)

No. 22, 29, 41
- Position: Safety

Personal information
- Born: February 12, 1981 (age 45); Miami, Florida, U.S.
- Listed height: 6 ft 0 in (1.83 m)
- Listed weight: 216 lb (98 kg)

Career information
- High school: Miami Jackson Senior
- College: Louisville
- NFL draft: 2003: 7th round, 217th overall pick

Career history
- Houston Texans (2003)*; Oakland Raiders (2003)*; Houston Texans (2003); New England Patriots (2004)*; New York Giants (2004); Washington Redskins (2005–2006); New Orleans Saints (2006)*; Houston Texans (2006)*; New Orleans Saints (2007)*
- * Offseason or practice squad member only

Career NFL statistics
- Tackles: 31
- Interceptions: 1
- Passes defended: 1
- Stats at Pro Football Reference

Curry Burns (born February 12, 1981) is an American former professional football player who was a safety in the National Football League (NFL). He played college football for the Louisville Cardinals.

== College career ==
Burns played college football at the University of Louisville and appeared in 74 games with 29 starts. He was part of a defensive secondary that tallied 52 interceptions over three seasons to rank second nationally. He finished his career with 336 tackles, eight interceptions, 16 passes defended, three forced fumbles, one fumble recovery and four blocked kicks. Burns ranks 10th on the school's career-record list in tackles. He was an All-Conference USA selection as a senior, posting career-high 111 tackles.

== Professional career ==
Pre-draft measurables
Height	Weight	Arm length	Hand span	40-yard dash	10-yard split	20-yard split	20-yard shuttle	Three-cone drill	Vertical jump	Broad jump	Bench press
6 ft 0 3/8 in (1.84 m)	216 lb (98 kg)	31 in (0.79 m)	9 5/8 in (0.24 m)	4.56 s	1.59 s	2.64 s	4.16 s	7.04 s	36.0 in (0.91 m)	10 ft 0 in (3.05 m)	19 reps
All values from NFL Combine

=== Houston Texans (first stint) ===
Burns was selected by the Houston Texans in the seventh round, with the 217th overall pick, of the 2003 NFL draft, Curry played safety. He officially signed with the team on June 4, 2003. He was waived on August 26, 2003.

=== Oakland Raiders ===
Burns was signed to the practice squad of the Oakland Raiders on November 27, 2003.

=== Houston Texans (second stint) ===
On December 2, 2003, the Texans signed Burns off of the Raiders' practice squad. He then played in one game for the Texans during the 2003 season. He re-signed with the Texans on March 23, 2004. Burns was waived on August 31, 2004.

=== New England Patriots ===
Burns was signed to the practice squad of the New England Patriots on September 15, 2004.

=== New York Giants ===
On October 6, 2004, the New York Giants signed Burns off of the Patriots' practice squad. He played in eight games, starting two, in 2004, recording 25 solo tackles, five assisted tackles, one interception and one pass breakup. He was waived by the Giants on September 3, 2005.

=== Washington Redskins ===
Burns was signed to the practice squad of the Washington Redskins on September 28, 2005. He signed a reserve/future contract with the Redskins on January 16, 2006. He was waived on September 2, re-signed on September 13, and waived again on October 16, 2006, to make room for Troy Vincent. Overall, he appeared in two games in 2006 and made one solo tackle.

=== New Orleans Saints (first stint) ===
Burns was signed to the practice squad of the New Orleans Saints on December 6, 2006. He was released on December 13, 2006.

=== Houston Texans (third stint) ===
Burns was signed to the practice squad of the Houston Texans on December 21, 2006.

=== New Orleans Saints (second stint) ===
Burns signed with the Saints on May 23, 2007. He was released on September 1, 2007.

== Personal life ==
He is the half-brother of Elvis Dumervil who plays for the Baltimore Ravens.
