= Chris Johnson (cornerback, born 1979) =

American football player (born 1979)

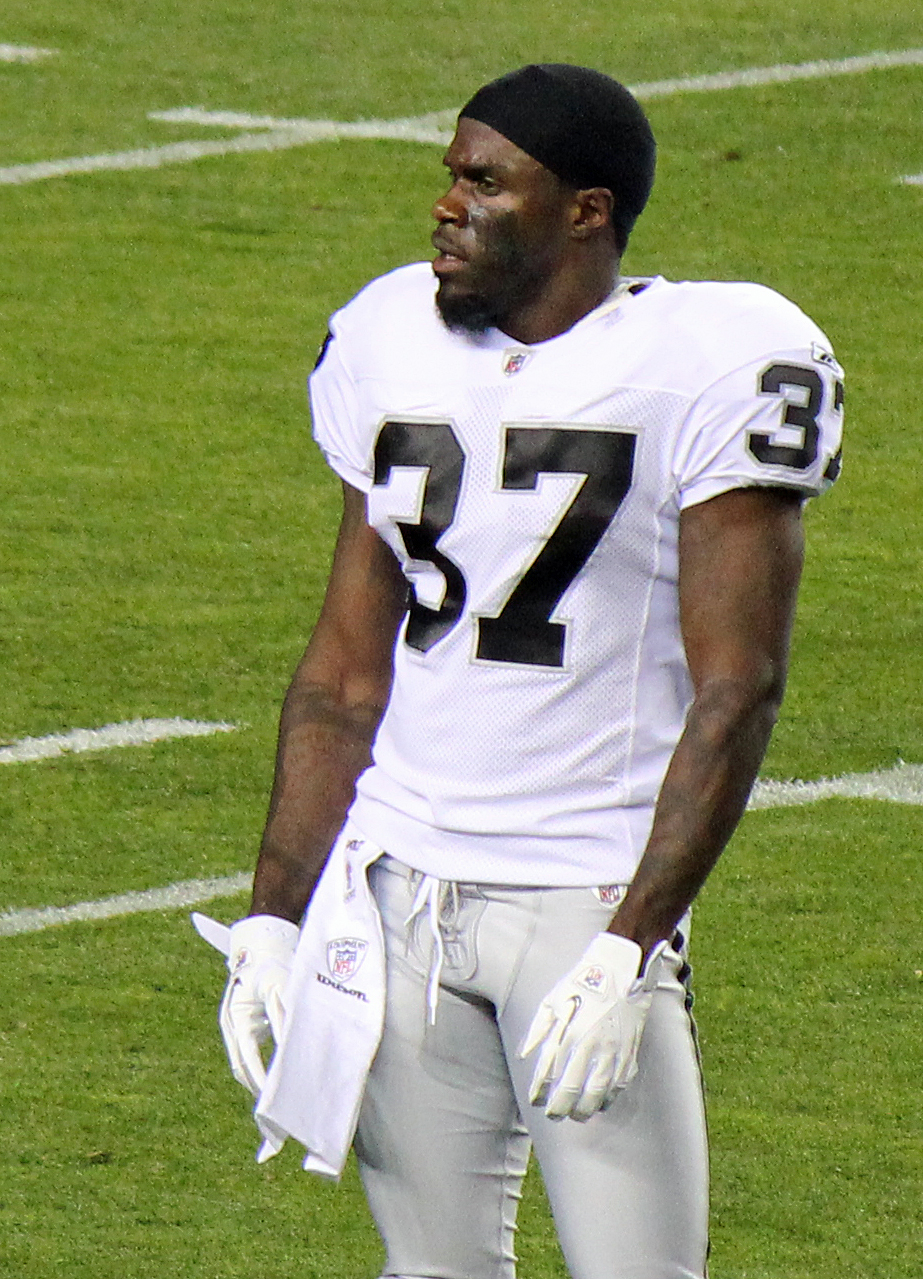
- Johnson with the Oakland Raiders in 2011

No. 37, 39
- Position: Cornerback

Personal information
- Born: September 25, 1979 (age 47); Gladewater, Texas, U.S.
- Listed height: 6 ft 1 in (1.85 m)
- Listed weight: 200 lb (91 kg)

Career information
- High school: Pine Tree (Longview, Texas)
- College: Louisville
- NFL draft: 2003: 7th round, 245th overall pick

Career history
- Green Bay Packers (2003–2004); St. Louis Rams (2005); Kansas City Chiefs (2006)*; Oakland Raiders (2007–2011); Baltimore Ravens (2012)
- * Offseason or practice squad member only

Awards and highlights
- Super Bowl champion (XLVII)

Career NFL statistics
- Total tackles: 197
- Forced fumbles: 4
- Fumble recoveries: 1
- Pass deflections: 49
- Interceptions: 8
- Total touchdowns: 2
- Stats at Pro Football Reference

Christopher Mario Johnson (born September 25, 1979) is an American former professional football player who was a cornerback in the National Football League (NFL). He was selected by the Green Bay Packers in the seventh round of the 2003 NFL draft. He played college football for the Louisville Cardinals. Johnson was also a member of the St. Louis Rams, Kansas City Chiefs, Oakland Raiders and Baltimore Ravens.

== Early life and college ==
Johnson was born in Gladewater, Texas. At Pine Tree High School, Johnson started in the football team; during his senior season, he intercepted 12 passes and helped the team reach a 7–3 record. Johnson attended Blinn College in Brenham, Texas and transferred to the University of Louisville, where he was a letterman for two years and majored in administration of justice. At Louisville, Johnson had 44 total tackles (32 solo), one tackle for a loss, and seven defended passes. In the 2001 Liberty Bowl, his first-ever major bowl game, Johnson started and intercepted a pass in the waning minutes of the fourth quarter to seal the Louisville Cardinals victory over the BYU Cougars 28–10.

== Professional career ==
Pre-draft measurables
Height	Weight
5 ft 11 1/4 in (1.81 m)	195 lb (88 kg)
Values from Pro Day

=== Green Bay Packers ===
Johnson was selected in the seventh round (245th overall) of the 2003 NFL draft by the Green Bay Packers.

=== St. Louis Rams ===
Johnson was traded to the St. Louis Rams in exchange for linebacker Robert Thomas during the 2005 NFL season. He played in 14 games, starting one and recorded 24 tackles (23 solo). He also had 38 kickoff returns for 857 yards (22.6 avg.) and a 99-yard touchdown return.

=== Kansas City Chiefs ===
Johnson signed with the Kansas City Chiefs during the 2006 off-season but was released before that season.

=== Oakland Raiders ===
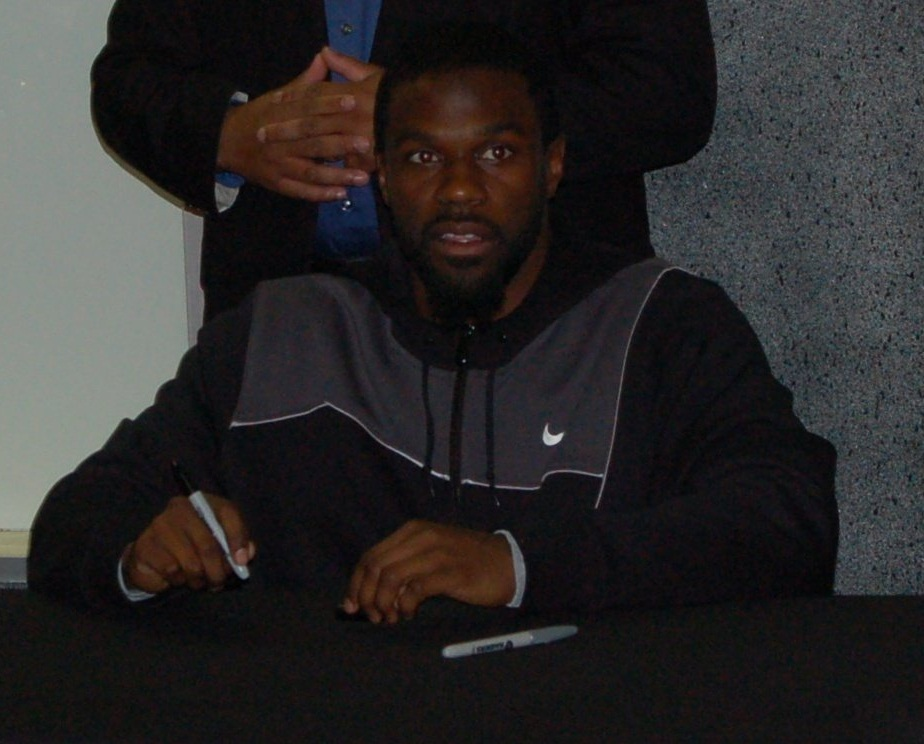
Johnson in 2009

On March 19, 2007, he signed with the Raiders. He played in 13 games at cornerback and special teams, contributing 10 special teams tackles and one solo tackle, two assists and two passes defensed at cornerback. In 2008, after six seasons in the NFL, Johnson recorded his first interception in a game against the San Diego Chargers, picking off quarterback Philip Rivers while covering wideout Buster Davis. Johnson was named a starter after the Raiders waived cornerback DeAngelo Hall. He recorded his second career interception when he picked off Kansas City Chiefs quarterback Tyler Thigpen.

In 2009, he signed a 4-year, $11.3 million contract with the Oakland Raiders. He was released by the Raiders following the 2011 season on March 9, 2012.

=== Baltimore Ravens ===
On November 13, 2012, Johnson signed with the Baltimore Ravens as a backup. The Ravens had already received injuries to corners Lardarius Webb and Jimmy Smith earlier in the year. In his first appearance in Week 11 against the Pittsburgh Steelers, he forced a fumble by Mike Wallace early in the first quarter which was recovered by Ed Reed. The Ravens would win 13–10. Johnson won the only Super Bowl of his career that year. On August 19, 2013, Johnson was cut by the Ravens.

== NFL career statistics ==
Legend
**Bold**	Career high

=== Regular season ===
Year	Team	Games		Tackles					Interceptions					Fumbles			
Year	Team	GP	GS	Cmb	Solo	Ast	Sck	TFL	Int	Yds	TD	Lng	PD	FF	FR	Yds	TD
2005	STL	13	1	45	42	3	0.0	3	0	0	0	0	4	**1**	**1**	0	0
2007	OAK	13	0	13	11	2	0.0	0	0	0	0	0	2	0	0	0	0
2008	OAK	**15**	7	34	32	2	0.0	**4**	**3**	**68**	0	**44**	12	**1**	0	0	0
2009	OAK	**15**	**15**	**68**	**59**	**9**	0.0	1	**3**	20	0	20	**18**	0	0	0	0
2010	OAK	12	4	16	15	1	0.0	0	2	30	**1**	30	9	0	0	0	0
2011	OAK	4	3	14	12	2	0.0	1	0	0	0	0	4	**1**	0	0	0
2012	BAL	5	1	7	7	0	0.0	0	0	0	0	0	0	**1**	0	0	0
Career		77	31	197	178	19	0.0	9	8	118	1	44	49	4	1	0	0

=== Playoffs ===
Year	Team	Games		Tackles					Interceptions					Fumbles			
Year	Team	GP	GS	Cmb	Solo	Ast	Sck	TFL	Int	Yds	TD	Lng	PD	FF	FR	Yds	TD
2012	BAL	**1**	0	0	0	0	0.0	0	0	0	0	0	0	0	0	0	0
Career		1	0	0	0	0	0.0	0	0	0	0	0	0	0	0	0	0
