= Dave Ragone =

American football player and coach (born 1979)

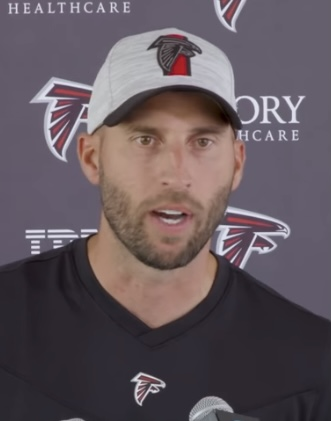
- Ragone in 2021

Los Angeles Rams
- Title: Associate offensive coordinator & quarterbacks coach

Personal information
- Born: October 3, 1979 (age 47); Middleburg Heights, Ohio, U.S.
- Listed height: 6 ft 4 in (1.93 m)
- Listed weight: 245 lb (111 kg)

Career information
- Position: Quarterback (No. 4)
- High school: St. Ignatius (Cleveland, Ohio)
- College: Louisville
- NFL draft: 2003: 3rd round, 88th overall pick

Career history

Playing
- Houston Texans (2003–2005); → Berlin Thunder (2005); Cincinnati Bengals (2006)*; St. Louis Rams (2006)*; Carolina Panthers (2007)*
- * Offseason or practice squad member only

Coaching
- Hartford Colonials (2010) Quarterbacks coach; Tennessee Titans (2011–2013); Wide receivers coach (2011–2012); Quarterbacks coach (2013); Washington Redskins (2015) Offensive quality control coach; Chicago Bears (2016–2020); Quarterbacks coach (2016–2019); Passing game coordinator (2020); Atlanta Falcons (2021–2023) Offensive coordinator; Los Angeles Rams (2024–present); Quarterbacks coach (2024–2025); Associate offensive coordinator & quarterbacks coach (2026–present)

Awards and highlights
- NFL Europe Offensive MVP (2005); 3× C-USA Offensive Player of the Year (2000-2002); Louisville Cardinals Ring of Honor

Career NFL statistics
- Passing attempts: 40
- Passing completions: 20
- Completion percentage: 50.0%
- TD–INT: 0–1
- Passing yards: 135
- Passer rating: 47.4
- Stats at Pro Football Reference
- Coaching profile at Pro Football Reference

David Patrick Ragone (born October 3, 1979) is an American professional football coach and former quarterback who currently serves as associate offensive coordinator and quarterbacks coach for the Los Angeles Rams of the National Football League (NFL). He was previously the offensive coordinator for the Atlanta Falcons and also served as an assistant coach for the Chicago Bears, Washington Redskins and Tennessee Titans.

Ragone played college football for the Louisville Cardinals and was selected in the third round of the 2003 NFL draft. He played as a quarterback in the NFL and NFL Europe.

== Early life ==
Ragone attended St. Ignatius High School and was a letterman in football and basketball. In football, as a senior quarterback, he was an All-State first-team honoree and led his team to the State Semi-Final game, losing 20–19 against Canton McKinley. Also as a senior, he was a starter on the basketball team that went on to be the State Runner-Up.

In the fall of 2009, Ragone was inducted into the Saint Ignatius Athletic Hall of Fame.

== Playing career ==
=== College ===
During his college career at the University of Louisville, he went 27–11 as a starting quarterback, including an 11–1 mark in 2001. Ragone finished his college years as Louisville's second all-time leading passer. He was a three-time All-American honorable mention and three-time Conference USA Offensive Player of the Year.

=== National Football League ===
Pre-draft measurables
Height	Weight	Arm length	Hand span	40-yard dash	10-yard split	20-yard split	20-yard shuttle	Three-cone drill	Vertical jump	Broad jump	Wonderlic
6 ft 3 5/8 in (1.92 m)	249 lb (113 kg)	31 1/2 in (0.80 m)	9 3/4 in (0.25 m)	4.99 s	1.78 s	2.93 s	4.36 s	7.42 s	30.5 in (0.77 m)	8 ft 5 in (2.57 m)	31
All values from NFL Combine

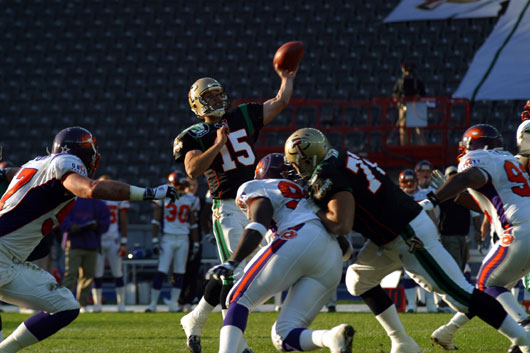
Ragone in 2005

Ragone was selected in the third round of the 2003 NFL draft by the Houston Texans and started in two games behind David Carr. In 2005, Ragone was named NFL Europe's Offensive MVP, leading the Berlin Thunder to World Bowl XIII. Ragone was waived by the Texans and claimed by the Cincinnati Bengals in May 2006. In June 2006, the Bengals traded Ragone to the St. Louis Rams.

Ragone was released by the Rams during training camp prior to the 2006 season. He then began a sports talk show on Louisville, Kentucky radio station WQKC.

== Coaching career ==
=== Hartford Colonials ===
On March 19, 2010, Ragone was named the wide receiver/quarterback coach for the Hartford Colonials of the United Football League. Under his coaching, quarterback Josh McCown was named Offensive Player of the Week on September 20, 2010. He would also lead the league in passer rating & touchdown passes.

=== Tennessee Titans ===
On February 22, 2011, Ragone was hired by the Tennessee Titans as their wide receivers coach, following his head coach Chris Palmer who was named offensive coordinator on the 15th. During the 2011 season, the Titans went 9–7 and missed the playoffs for the third consecutive season. Under his coaching, wide receiver Nate Washington eclipsed 1,000 yards and recorded seven touchdowns.

During the 2012 NFL draft, the Titans selected wide receiver Kendall Wright with the 20th pick. Wright would go on to lead all NFL rookies with 64 receptions. The Titans went 6–10 in 2012, and missed the playoffs for the fourth straight year.

On January 18, 2013, Ragone was reassigned from wide receiver to quarterbacks coach, replacing Dowell Loggains who was promoted to offensive coordinator after the Titans fired Chris Palmer on November 26, 2012. The Titans went 7-9 and missed the playoffs for the fifth straight year. At the end of the season, head coach Mike Munchak was fired, leaving Ragone without a job.

=== Washington Redskins ===
On February 27, 2015, Ragone was hired as the offensive quality control coach for the Washington Redskins.

=== Chicago Bears ===
On January 22, 2016, Ragone was named quarterbacks coach of the Chicago Bears under head coach John Fox. The Bears went 3–13 and missed the playoffs, the worst record for the franchise since the NFL moved to 16-game seasons in 1978. Although Ragone was tasked with coaching quarterback Jay Cutler, Cutler and the team struggled with injuries, forcing backups Brian Hoyer and Matt Barkley into action. The Bears also went 0–8 on the road for the first time in franchise history.

During the 2017 NFL Draft, the Bears selected quarterback Mitchell Trubisky with the 2nd overall pick. They also signed former Tampa Bay Buccaneers starting quarterback Mike Glennon in free agency. The Bears went 5–11 and missed the playoffs for the fourth consecutive season.

When Fox was fired after the 2017 season, Ragone was retained by new coach Matt Nagy; he was the lone offensive assistant from the Fox regime to stay with the Bears. The Bears went 12–4 in 2018, earning a winning season for the first time since 2012, making the playoffs and winning the NFC North for the first time since 2010. They would go on to lose to the Philadelphia Eagles in the wild card round 16–15 with Trubisky setting numerous franchise passing records. Under his coaching, Trubisky would be selected to the Pro Bowl.

The Bears went 8–8 in 2019 and missed the playoffs. On January 16, 2020, Nagy hired John DeFilippo as quarterbacks coach and Ragone was promoted to passing game coordinator.

=== Atlanta Falcons ===
On January 21, 2021, Ragone was hired by the Atlanta Falcons as their offensive coordinator under head coach Arthur Smith. Following Smith's firing after the 2023 season, Ragone was not retained under new head coach Raheem Morris.

=== Los Angeles Rams ===
On February 19, 2024, Ragone was named quarterbacks coach of the Los Angeles Rams under head coach Sean McVay. On February 23, 2026, the Rams announced that Ragone was given the additional title of associate offensive coordinator along with keeping his role of quarterbacks coach.
