= 2019 Arkansas Razorbacks football team =

American college football season

2019 Arkansas Razorbacks football
- Conference: Southeastern Conference
- Western Division
- Record: 2–10 (0–8 SEC)
- Head coach: Chad Morris (2nd season; first 10 games); Barry Lunney Jr. (interim; final 2 games)
- Offensive coordinator: Joe Craddock (2nd season)
- Offensive scheme: Power spread
- Defensive coordinator: John Chavis (2nd season)
- Base defense: 4–3
- Captains: McTelvin Agim; De'Jon Harris; T. J. Smith
- Home stadium: Donald W. Reynolds Razorback Stadium; War Memorial Stadium

Uniform
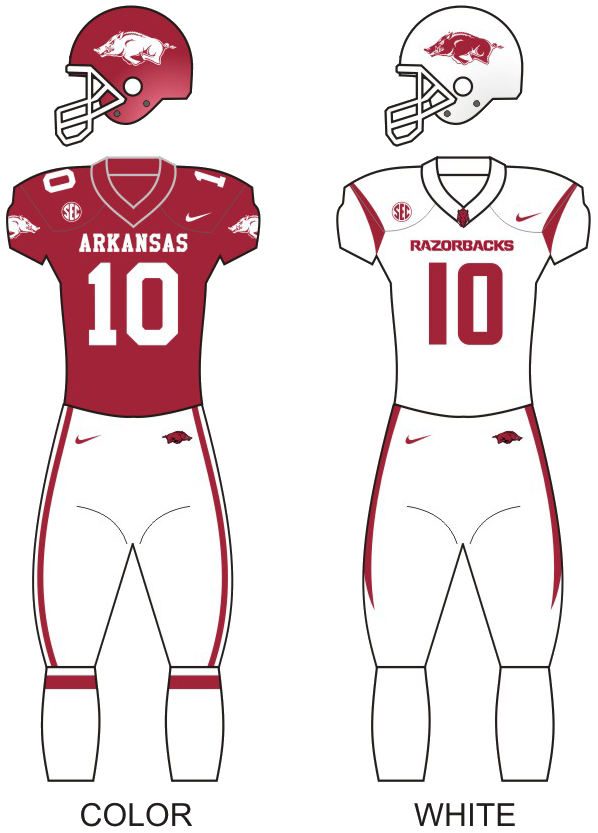

2019 Southeastern Conference football standings
	Conf.			Overall
Team	W		L	W		L
Eastern Division
No. 4 Georgia x	7	–	1	12	–	2
No. 6 Florida	6	–	2	11	–	2
Tennessee *	5	–	3	8	–	5
Kentucky	3	–	5	8	–	5
Missouri *	3	–	5	6	–	6
South Carolina	3	–	5	4	–	8
Vanderbilt	1	–	7	3	–	9
Western Division
No. 1 LSU x$#^	8	–	0	15	–	0
No. 8 Alabama	6	–	2	11	–	2
No. 14 Auburn	5	–	3	9	–	4
Texas A&M	4	–	4	8	–	5
Mississippi State	3	–	5	6	–	7
Ole Miss	2	–	6	4	–	8
Arkansas	0	–	8	2	–	10
Championship: LSU 37, Georgia 10
# – College Football Playoff champion; ^ – College Football Playoff participant; $ – Conference champion; x – Division champion/co-champions; * – Tennessee vacated all wins due to NCAA violations. Missouri was ineligible for postseason due to NCAA sanctions.; Rankings from AP Poll

The 2019 Arkansas Razorbacks football team represented the University of Arkansas as a member of the Southeastern Conference (SEC) during the 2019 NCAA Division I FBS football season. Led by Chad Morris in his second and final season as head coach for the first ten games of the year and then Barry Lunney Jr. as interim head coach for the remainder of the season, the Razorbacks compiled an overall record of 2–10 with a mark of 0–8 in conference play, placing last out of seven team in the SEC's Western Division. The team played six home games at Donald W. Reynolds Razorback Stadium in Fayetteville, Arkansas and one home game at War Memorial Stadium in Little Rock, Arkansas.

On November 10, a day after the Razorbacks' loss to Western Kentucky, Morris was fired. He finished his tenure at Arkansas with an overall record of 4–18 and an SEC record of 0–14. Tight ends coach Barry Lunney Jr. finished the season as interim head coach. The Razorbacks lost their last nine games of the season and finished the season on a 19-game losing streak against SEC opponents, dating back to the 2017 season.

== Schedule ==
The Razorbacks' 2019 schedule consisted of seven home games, four away games, and one neutral site game.

Date	Time	Opponent	Site	TV	Result	Attendance	Source
August 31	3:00 p.m.	Portland State*	Donald W. Reynolds Razorback Stadium; Fayetteville, AR	SECN	W 20–13	61,055	
September 7	6:30 p.m.	at Ole Miss	Vaught–Hemingway Stadium; Oxford, MS (rivalry)	SECN	L 17–31	47,915	
September 14	3:00 p.m.	Colorado State*	Donald W. Reynolds Razorback Stadium; Fayetteville, AR	SECN	W 55–34	55,583	
September 21	6:30 p.m.	San Jose State*	Donald W. Reynolds Razorback Stadium; Fayetteville, AR	SECN	L 24–31	56,058	
September 28	11:00 a.m.	vs. No. 23 Texas A&M	AT&T Stadium; Arlington, TX (Southwest Classic)	ESPN	L 27–31	51,441	
October 12	6:30 p.m.	at Kentucky	Kroger Field; Lexington, KY	SECN	L 20–24	57,060	
October 19	11:00 a.m.	No. 11 Auburn	Donald W. Reynolds Razorback Stadium; Fayetteville, AR	SECN	L 10–51	54,619	
October 26	6:00 p.m.	at No. 1 Alabama	Bryant–Denny Stadium; Tuscaloosa, AL	ESPN	L 7–48	100,233	
November 2	3:00 p.m.	Mississippi State^{†}	Donald W. Reynolds Razorback Stadium; Fayetteville, AR	SECN	L 24–54	52,256	
November 9	11:00 a.m.	Western Kentucky*	Donald W. Reynolds Razorback Stadium; Fayetteville, AR	SECN	L 19–45	42,985	
November 23	6:00 p.m.	at No. 1 LSU	Tiger Stadium; Baton Rouge, LA (rivalry)	ESPN	L 20–56	101,173	
November 29	1:30 p.m.	Missouri	War Memorial Stadium; Little Rock, AR (Battle Line Rivalry)	CBS	L 14–24	33,961	
*Non-conference game; ^{†}Homecoming; Rankings from AP Poll and CFP Rankings after November 5 released prior to game; All times are in Central time

== Preseason ==
=== SEC media poll ===
The SEC media poll was released on July 19, 2019, with the Razorbacks predicted to finish in last place.

=== Preseason All-SEC teams ===
The Razorbacks had two players selected to the preseason all-SEC teams.

Defense

2nd team

De'Jon Harris – LB

3rd team

McTelvin Agim – DL

== Game summaries ==
=== Portland State ===
Uniform combination
Helmet	Jersey	Pants

Game One – Portland State Vikings (0–0) at Arkansas Razorbacks (0–0)

Quarter	1	2	3	4	Total
Vikings	3	3	0	7	13
Razorbacks	10	0	7	3	20

at Donald W. Reynolds Razorback Stadium • Fayetteville, Arkansas

- Date: Saturday, August 31, 2019
- Game time: 3:00 p.m. CDT
- Game weather: Clear • Temperature: 83 °F (28 °C) • Wind: WNW 5 mph
- Game attendance: 61,055
- Referee: Wayne Winkler
- TV announcers (SEC Network): Dave Neal (play-by-play), D. J. Shockley (color), Dawn Davenport (sideline)

Game information

First Quarter

- (13:09) PRST – Cody Williams 50 yard field goal (Drive: 6 plays, 42 yards, 1:51; Portland State 3–0)
- (9:40) ARK – Connor Limpert 34 yard field goal (Drive: 9 plays, 54 yards, 3:29; Tied 3–3)
- (3:16) ARK – Devwah Whaley 1 yard rush, Connor Limpert kick (Drive: 10 plays, 64 yards, 4:15; Arkansas 10–3)

Second Quarter

- (14:07) PRST – Cody Williams 47 yard field goal (Drive: 11 plays, 45 yards, 4:09; Arkansas 10–6)

Third Quarter

- (2:20) ARK – Rakeem Boyd 2 yard rush, Connor Limpert kick (Drive: 12 plays, 67 yards, 4:57; Arkansas 17–6)

Fourth Quarter

- (10:44) ARK – Connor Limpert 25 yard field goal (Drive: 12 plays, 63 yards, 5:09; Arkansas 20–6)
- (4:14) PRST – Charlie Taumoepeau 32 yard pass from Jalani Eason, Cody Williams kick (Drive: 14 plays, 75 yards, 6:30; Arkansas 20–13)

Statistics	PRST	ARK
First downs	16	26
Total yards	230	395
Rushes–yards	28–75	42–204
Passing yards	155	191
Passing: Comp–Att–Int	16–33–3	18–35–1
Time of possession	26:22	33:38

Team	Category	Player	Statistics
Portland State	Passing	Davis Alexander	10/21, 81 yards, 1 INT
Portland State	Rushing	Sirgeo Hoffman	4 carries, 28 yards
Portland State	Receiving	Charlie Taumoepeau	4 receptions, 56 yards, 1 TD
Arkansas	Passing	Ben Hicks	14/29, 143 yards
Arkansas	Rushing	Rakeem Boyd	18 carries, 114 yards, 1 TD
Arkansas	Receiving	Treylon Burks	3 receptions, 52 yards

=== At Ole Miss ===
Uniform combination
Helmet	Jersey	Pants

Game Two – Arkansas Razorbacks (1–0) at Ole Miss Rebels (0–1)

Quarter	1	2	3	4	Total
Razorbacks	0	3	0	14	17
Rebels	7	3	7	14	31

at Vaught–Hemingway Stadium • Oxford, Mississippi

- Date: Saturday, September 7, 2019
- Game time: 6:30 p.m. CDT
- Game weather: Clear • Temperature: 85 °F (29 °C) • Wind: N 6 mph
- Game attendance: 47,915
- Referee: Matt Loeffler
- TV announcers (SEC Network): Tom Hart (play-by-play), Jordan Rodgers (color), Cole Cubelic (sideline)

Game information

First Quarter

- (8:41) MISS – Elijah Moore 2 yard pass from Matt Corral, Luke Logan kick (Drive: 13 plays, 85 yards, 4:35; Ole Miss 7–0)

Second Quarter

- (8:19) ARK – Connor Limpert 36 yard field goal (Drive: 7 plays, 36 yards, 3:11; Ole Miss 7–3)
- (2:24) MISS – Luke Logan 33 yard field goal (Drive: 7 plays, 31 yards, 3:06; Ole Miss 10–3)

Third Quarter

- (2:34) MISS – Scottie Phillips 1 yard rush, Luke Logan kick (Drive: 8 plays, 71 yards, 2:59; Ole Miss 17–3)

Fourth Quarter

- (13:31) ARK – Kamren Curl 69 yard rumble return, Connor Limpert kick (Ole Miss 17–10)
- (11:09) MISS – Elijah Moore 46 yard pass from Matt Corral, Luke Logan kick (Drive: 5 plays, 74 yards, 2:17; Ole Miss 24–10)
- (6:03) MISS – Scottie Phillips 26 yard rush, Luke Logan kick (Drive: 5 plays, 66 yards, 3:05; Ole Miss 31–10)
- (1:21) ARK – Koilan Jackson 7 yard pass from Nick Starkel, Connor Limpert kick (Drive: 7 plays, 81 yards, 2:06; Ole Miss 31–17)

Statistics	ARK	MISS
First downs	18	23
Total yards	361	483
Rushes–yards	26–61	53–237
Passing yards	300	246
Passing: Comp–Att–Int	25–41–0	16–24–0
Time of possession	27:32	32:28

Team	Category	Player	Statistics
Arkansas	Passing	Nick Starkel	17/24, 201 yards, 1 TD
Arkansas	Rushing	Rakeem Boyd	17 carries, 67 yards
Arkansas	Receiving	Trey Knox	6 receptions, 88 yards
Ole Miss	Passing	Matt Corral	16/24, 246 yards, 2 TD
Ole Miss	Rushing	Scottie Phillips	26 yards, 143 yards, 2 TD
Ole Miss	Receiving	Elijah Moore	7 receptions, 130 yards, 2 TD

=== Colorado State ===
Uniform combination
Helmet	Jersey	Pants

Game Three – Colorado State Rams (1–1) at Arkansas Razorbacks (1–1)

Quarter	1	2	3	4	Total
Rams	14	10	10	0	34
Razorbacks	24	3	7	21	55

at Donald W. Reynolds Razorback Stadium • Fayetteville, Arkansas

- Date: Saturday, September 14, 2019
- Game time: 3:00 p.m. CDT
- Game weather: Clear • Temperature: 87 °F (31 °C) • Wind: S 9 mph
- Game attendance: 55,583
- Referee: Marc Curles
- TV announcers (SEC Network): Dave Neal (play-by-play), D. J. Shockley (color), Dawn Davenport (sideline)

Game information

First Quarter

- (14:42) CSU – Marvin Kinsey Jr. 75 yard rush, Cayden Camper kick (Drive: 2 plays, 75 yards, 0:18; Colorado State 7–0)
- (13:00) ARK – Trey Knox 24 yard pass from Nick Starkel, Connor Limpert kick (Drive: 5 plays, 75 yards, 1:42; Tied 7–7)
- (7:54) ARK – Chase Harrell 14 yard pass from Nick Starkel, Connor Limpert kick (Drive: 11 yards, 82 yards, 3:34; Arkansas 14–7)
- (5:54) ARK – Rakeem Boyd 59 yard rush, Connor Limpert kick (Drive: 2 plays, 75 yards, 0:25; Arkansas 21–7)
- (3:27) CSU – Warren Jackson 14 yard pass from Collin Hill, Cayden Camper kick (Drive: 5 plays, 75 yards, 2:32; Arkansas 21–14)
- (1:02) ARK – Connor Limpert 54 yard field goal (Drive: 6 plays, 28 yards, 2:25; Arkansas 24–14)

Second Quarter

- (11:41) ARK – Connor Limpert 22 yard field goal (Drive: 9 plays, 34 yards, 3:13; Arkansas 27–14)
- (7:31) CSU – Collin Hill 1 yard rush, Cayden Camper kick (Drive: 5 plays, 40 yards, 1:55; Arkansas 27–21)
- (0:04) CSU – Cayden Camper 46 yard field goal (Drive: 10 plays, 52 yards, 2:37; Arkansas 27–24)

Third Quarter

- (13:07) ARK – Rakeem Boyd 4 yard rush, Connor Limpert kick (Drive: 8 plays, 75 yards, 1:53; Arkansas 34–24)
- (5:45) CSU – Cayden Camper 21 yard field goal (Drive: 15 plays, 72 yards, 7:22; Arkansas 34–27)
- (2:26) CSU – Dante Wright 75 yard pass from Patrick O'Brien, Cayden Camper kick (Drive: 3 plays, 72 yards, 1:44; Tied 34–34)

Fourth Quarter

- (8:52) ARK – Devwah Whaley 5 yard rush, Connor Limpert kick (Drive: 9 plays, 68 yards, 2:43; Arkansas 41–34)
- (5:32) ARK – Cheyenne O'Grady 62 yard pass from Nick Starkel, Connor Limpert kick (Drive: 4 plays, 74 yards, 2:10; Arkansas 48–34)
- (3:31) ARK – LaDarrius Bishop 25 yard fumble return, Connor Limpert kick (Arkansas 55–34)

Statistics	CSU	ARK
First downs	18	23
Total yards	425	520
Rushes–yards	38–220	35–215
Passing yards	205	305
Passing: Comp–Att–Int	20–33–0	20–35–0
Time of possession	33:56	26:04

Team	Category	Player	Statistics
Colorado State	Passing	Patrick O'Brien	7/10, 106 yards, 1 TD
Colorado State	Rushing	Marvin Kinsey Jr.	20 carries, 180 yards, 1 TD
Colorado State	Receiving	Dante Wright	4 receptions, 97 yards, 1 TD
Arkansas	Passing	Nick Starkel	20/35, 305 yards, 3 TD
Arkansas	Rushing	Rakeem Boyd	20 yards, 122 yards, 2 TD
Arkansas	Receiving	Treylon Burks	4 receptions, 92 yards

=== San Jose State ===
Uniform combination
Helmet	Jersey	Pants

Game Four – San Jose State Spartans (1–1) at Arkansas Razorbacks (2–1)

Quarter	1	2	3	4	Total
Spartans	7	17	0	7	31
Razorbacks	7	0	3	14	24

at Donald W. Reynolds Razorback Stadium • Fayetteville, Arkansas

- Date: Saturday, September 21, 2019
- Game time: 6:30 p.m. CDT
- Game weather: Partly cloudy • Temperature: 80 °F (27 °C) • Wind: SSE 9 mph
- Game attendance: 56,058
- Referee: Hubert Owens
- TV announcers (SEC Network): Dave Neal (play-by-play), D. J. Shockley (color), Dawn Davenport (sideline)

Game information

First Quarter

- (12:44) SJSU – Jaqu Blackwell 3 yard pass from Josh Love, Matt Mercurio kick (Drive: 7 plays, 75 yards, 2:16; San Jose State 7–0)
- (1:07) ARK – Michael Woods II 62 yard pass from Nick Starkel, Connor Limpert kick (Drive: 4 plays, 72 yards, 1:18; Tied 7–7)

Second Quarter

- (14:18) SJSU – Nick Nash 15 yard rush, Matt Mercurio kick (Drive: 2 plays, 28 yards, 0:27; San Jose State 14–7)
- (6:09) SJSU – Matt Mercurio 47 yard field goal (Drive: 7 plays, 47 yards, 2:12; San Jose State 17–7)
- (1:06) SJSU – Isaiah Holiness 26 yard pass from Josh Love, Matt Mercurio kick (Drive: 9 plays, 79 yards, 3:48; San Jose State 24–7)

Third Quarter

- (5:01) ARK – Connor Limpert 48 yard field goal (Drive: 6 plays, 26 yards, 2:00; San Jose State 24–10)

Fourth Quarter

- (13:10) ARK – Tyson Morris 30 yard pass from Nick Starkel, Connor Limpert kick (Drive: 9 plays, 80 yards, 3:09; San Jose State 24–17)
- (2:56) ARK – Trey Knox 8 yard pass from Nick Starkel, Connor Limpert kick (Drive: 7 plays, 80 yards, 2:55; Tied 24–24)
- (1:13) SJSU – Dejon Packer 19 yard rush, Matt Mercurio kick (Drive: 5 plays, 75 yards, 1:43; San Jose State 31–24)

Statistics	SJSU	ARK
First downs	27	26
Total yards	503	487
Rushes–yards	24–101	32–131
Passing yards	402	356
Passing: Comp–Att–Int	32–49–1	28–50–5
Time of possession	30:54	29:06

Team	Category	Player	Statistics
San Jose State	Passing	Josh Love	32/49, 402 yards, 2 TD, 1 INT
San Jose State	Rushing	Dejon Packer	8 carries, 40 yards, 1 TD
San Jose State	Receiving	Tre Walker	12 receptions, 161 yards
Arkansas	Passing	Nick Starkel	28/50, 356 yards, 3 TD, 5 INT
Arkansas	Rushing	Rakeem Boyd	18 carries, 91 yards
Arkansas	Receiving	Michael Woods II	4 receptions, 115 yards, 1 TD

=== Vs. Texas A&M ===
Uniform combination
Helmet	Jersey	Pants

Game Five – Arkansas Razorbacks (2–2) vs. #23 Texas A&M Aggies (2–2)

Quarter	1	2	3	4	Total
Razorbacks	0	17	7	3	27
No. 23 Aggies	7	14	0	10	31

at AT&T Stadium • Arlington, Texas

- Date: Saturday, September 28, 2019
- Game time: 11:00 a.m. CDT
- Game weather: n/a (game played indoors)
- Game attendance: 51,441
- Referee: Steve Marlowe
- TV announcers (ESPN): Mark Jones (play-by-play), Dusty Dvoracek (color), Olivia Dekker (sideline)

Game information

First Quarter

- (2:56) A&M – Ainias Smith 9 yard pass from Kellen Mond, Seth Small kick (Drive: 7 plays, 63 yards, 3:51; Texas A&M 7–0)

Second Quarter

- (14:15) ARK – Connor Limpert 46 yard field goal (Drive: 10 plays, 47 yards, 3:41; Texas A&M 7–3)
- (9:48) A&M – Isaiah Spiller 4 yard run, Seth Small kick (Drive: 11 plays, 75 yards, 4:27; Texas A&M 14–3)
- (5:30) ARK – De'Jon Harris 6 yard fumble return, Connor Limpert kick (Texas A&M 14–10)
- (1:55) ARK – Michael Woods II 13 yard pass from Ben Hicks, Connor Limpert kick (Drive: 4 plays, 41 yards, 1:21; Arkansas 17–14)
- (0:08) A&M – Quartney Davis 22 yard pass from Kellen Mond, Seth Small kick (Drive: 11 plays, 75 yards, 1:47; Texas A&M 21–17)

Third Quarter

- (10:34) ARK – Devwah Whaley 11 yard run, Connor Limpert kick (Drive: 8 plays, 84 yards, 2:37; Arkansas 24–21)

Fourth Quarter

- (12:21) A&M – Quartney Davis 3 yard pass from Kellen Mond, Seth Small kick (Drive: 7 plays, 34 yards, 4:30; Texas A&M 28–24)
- (8:46) ARK – Connor Limpert 46 yard field goal (Drive: 11 plays, 53 yards, 3:35; Texas A&M 28–27)
- (3:52) A&M – Seth Small 50 yard field goal (Drive: 11 plays, 43 yards, 4:54; Texas A&M 31–27)

Statistics	ARK	A&M
First downs	24	26
Total yards	340	395
Rushes–yards	33–89	26–98
Passing yards	251	297
Passing: Comp–Att–Int	23–35–1	27–44–1
Time of possession	32:37	27:23

Team	Category	Player	Statistics
Arkansas	Passing	Ben Hicks	15/27, 188 yards, 1 TD
Arkansas	Rushing	Rakeem Boyd	18 carries, 89 yards
Arkansas	Receiving	Cheyenne O'Grady	8 receptions, 91 yards
Texas A&M	Passing	Kellen Mond	23/35, 251 yards, 3 TD, 1 INT
Texas A&M	Rushing	Jacob Kibodi	9 carries, 38 yards
Texas A&M	Receiving	Jhamon Ausbon	7 receptions, 82 yards

=== At Kentucky ===
Uniform combination
Helmet	Jersey	Pants

Game Six – Arkansas Razorbacks (2–3) at Kentucky Wildcats (2–3)

Quarter	1	2	3	4	Total
Razorbacks	7	6	0	7	20
Wildcats	0	7	10	7	24

at Kroger Field • Lexington, Kentucky

- Date: Saturday, October 12, 2019
- Game time: 6:30 p.m. CDT
- Game weather: Clear • Temperature: 52 °F (11 °C) • Wind: S 5 mph
- Game attendance: 57,060
- Referee: Jason McArthur
- TV announcers (SEC Network): Tom Hart (play-by-play), Jordan Rodgers (color), Cole Cubelic (sideline)

Game information

First Quarter

- (14:18) ARK – Rakeem Boyd 74 yard rush, Connor Limpert kick (Drive: 2 plays, 75 yards, 0:42; Arkansas 7–0)

Second Quarter

- (14:57) ARK – Connor Limpert 28 yard field goal (Drive: 8 plays, 22 yards, 1:50; Arkansas 10–0)
- (5:48) ARK – Connor Limpert 44 yard field goal (Drive: 10 plays, 45 yards, 3:58; Arkansas 13–0)
- (0:55) UK – Lynn Bowden 3 yard rush, Matt Ruffolo kick (Drive: 10 plays, 75 yards, 4:53; Arkansas 13–7)

Third Quarter

- (9:02) UK – Matt Ruffolo 50 yard field goal (Drive: 13 plays, 45 yards, 5:52; Arkansas 13–10)
- (1:50) UK – Clevan Thomas 10 yard pass from Lynn Bowden, Matt Ruffolo kick (Drive: 6 plays, 48 yards, 3:16; Kentucky 17–13)

Fourth Quarter

- (10:35) ARK – Rakeem Boyd 2 yard rush, Connor Limpert kick (Drive: 3 plays, 29 yards, 0:52; Arkansas 20–17)
- (6:53) UK – Lynn Bowden 24 yard rush, Matt Ruffolo kick (Drive: 6 plays, 75 yards, 3:42; Kentucky 24–20)

Statistics	ARK	UK
First downs	16	21
Total yards	305	418
Rushes–yards	30–183	54–330
Passing yards	112	88
Passing: Comp–Att–Int	12–27–0	8–12–0
Time of possession	22:49	37:11

Team	Category	Player	Statistics
Arkansas	Passing	Ben Hicks	5/8, 81 yards
Arkansas	Rushing	Rakeem Boyd	15 carries, 134 yards, 2 TD
Arkansas	Receiving	Cheyenne O'Grady	4 receptions, 44 yards
Kentucky	Passing	Lynn Bowden	7/11, 78 yards, 1 TD
Kentucky	Rushing	Lynn Bowden	24 carries, 196 yards, 2 TD
Kentucky	Receiving	Justin Rigg	2 receptions, 43 yards

=== Auburn ===
Uniform combination
Helmet	Jersey	Pants

Game Seven – #11 Auburn Tigers (5–1) at Arkansas Razorbacks (2–4)

Quarter	1	2	3	4	Total
No. 11 Tigers	17	0	14	20	51
Razorbacks	0	0	10	0	10

at Donald W. Reynolds Razorback Stadium • Fayetteville, Arkansas

- Date: Saturday, October 19, 2019
- Game time: 11:00 a.m. CDT
- Game weather: Partly cloudy • Temperature: 56 °F (13 °C) • Wind: SE 3 mph
- Game attendance: 54,619
- Referee: Lee Hedrick
- TV announcers (SEC Network): Taylor Zarzour (play-by-play), Matt Stinchcomb (color), Alyssa Lang (sideline)

Game information

First Quarter

- (12:38) AUB – Bo Nix 4 yard rush, Anders Carlson kick (Drive: 3 plays, 22 yards, 1:02; Auburn 7–0)
- (10:48) AUB – Shaun Shivers 6 yard rush, Anders Carlson kick (Drive: 3 plays, 63 yards, 0:57; Auburn 14–0)
- (0:51) AUB – Anders Carlson 44 yard field goal (Drive: 13 plays, 55 yards, 5:32; Auburn 17–0)

Second Quarter

No scoring

Third Quarter

- (5:53) ARK – Connor Limpert 28 yard field goal (Drive: 16 plays, 77 yards, 7:30; Auburn 17–3)
- (4:19) AUB – Seth Williams 48 yard pass from Bo Nix, Anders Carlson kick (Drive: 5 plays, 72 yards, 1:34; Auburn 24–3)
- (3:57) AUB – Anthony Schwartz 28 yard pass from Bo Nix, Anders Carlson kick (Drive: 2 plays, 56 yards, 0:16; Auburn 31–3)
- (0:14) ARK – Cheyenne O'Grady 45 yard pass from Ben Hicks, Connor Limpert kick (Drive: 1 play, 45 yards, 0:10; Auburn 31–10)

Fourth Quarter

- (11:54) AUB – Seth Williams 15 yard pass from Bo Nix, kick failed (Drive: 8 plays, 64 yards, 3:20; Auburn 37–10)
- (7:03) AUB – Jay Jay Wilson 17 yard pass from Joey Gatewood, Anders Carlson kick (Drive: 8 plays, 59 yards, 4:21; Auburn 44–10)
- (2:27) AUB – Harold Joiner 32 yard rush, Anders Carlson kick (Drive: 5 plays, 65 yards, 3:02; Auburn 51–10)

Statistics	AUB	ARK
First downs	24	14
Total yards	491	234
Rushes–yards	51–298	28–52
Passing yards	193	182
Passing: Comp–Att–Int	13–19–0	19–40–2
Time of possession	30:25	29:35

Team	Category	Player	Statistics
Auburn	Passing	Bo Nix	12/17, 176 yards, 3 TD
Auburn	Rushing	Kam Martin	10 carries, 84 yards
Auburn	Receiving	Seth Williams	4 receptions, 90 yards, 2 TD
Arkansas	Passing	Ben Hicks	19/39, 182 yards, 1 TD, 1 INT
Arkansas	Rushing	Rakeem Boyd	13 carries, 39 yards
Arkansas	Receiving	Cheyenne O'Grady	7 receptions, 72 yards, 1 TD

=== At Alabama ===
Uniform combination
Helmet	Jersey	Pants

Game Eight – Arkansas Razorbacks (2–5) at #1 Alabama Crimson Tide (7–0)

Quarter	1	2	3	4	Total
Razorbacks	0	0	0	7	7
No. 1 Crimson Tide	17	24	7	0	48

at Bryant–Denny Stadium • Tuscaloosa, Alabama

- Date: Saturday, October 26, 2019
- Game time: 6:00 p.m. CDT
- Game weather: Partly cloudy • Temperature: 71 °F (22 °C) • Wind: SW 11 mph
- Game attendance: 100,283
- Referee: Marc Curles
- TV announcers (ESPN): Dave Pasch (play-by-play), Greg McElroy (color), Tom Luginbill (sideline)

Game information

First Quarter

- (5:53) BAMA – Joseph Bulovas 31 yard field goal (Drive: 14 plays, 69 yards, 6:27; Alabama 3–0)
- (4:03) BAMA – Henry Ruggs 14 yard pass from Mac Jones, Joseph Bulovas kick (Drive: 1 play, 14 yards, 0:07; Alabama 10–0)
- (0:34) BAMA – Jerry Jeudy 14 yard pass from Mac Jones, Joseph Bulovas kick (Drive: 5 plays, 48 yards, 1:42; Alabama 17–0)

Second Quarter

- (12:25) BAMA – Najee Harris 1 yard rush, Joseph Bulovas kick (Drive: 6 plays, 70 yards, 2:16; Alabama 24–0)
- (9:57) BAMA – Najee Harris 1 yard rush, Joseph Bulovas kick (Drive: 4 plays, 48 yards, 1:30; Alabama 31–0)
- (2:36) BAMA – Joseph Bulovas 30 yard field goal (Drive: 5 plays, 13 yards, 1:48; Alabama 34–0)
- (0:07) BAMA – Trevon Diggs 84 yard interception return, Joseph Bulovas kick (Alabama 41–0)

Third Quarter

- (12:38) BAMA – Jerry Jeudy 40 yard pass from Mac Jones, Joseph Bulovas kick (Drive: 5 plays, 64 yards, 2:22; Alabama 48–0)

Fourth Quarter

- (14:52) ARK – Cheyenne O'Grady 8 yard pass from John Stephen Jones, Connor Limpert kick (Drive: 13 plays, 85 yards, 7:34; Alabama 48–7)

Statistics	ARK	BAMA
First downs	13	23
Total yards	213	459
Rushes–yards	30–106	38–179
Passing yards	107	280
Passing: Comp–Att–Int	11–26–3	24–30–0
Time of possession	25:26	34:34

Team	Category	Player	Statistics
Arkansas	Passing	Nick Starkel	5/19, 58 yards, 3 INT
Arkansas	Rushing	Rakeem Boyd	12 carries, 50 yards
Arkansas	Receiving	Rakeem Boyd	4 receptions, 55 yards
Alabama	Passing	Mac Jones	18/22, 235 yards, 3 TD
Alabama	Rushing	Najee Harris	13 carries, 86 yards, 2 TD
Alabama	Receiving	Jerry Jeudy	7 receptions, 103 yards, 2 TD

=== Mississippi State ===
Uniform combination
Helmet	Jersey	Pants

Game Nine – Mississippi State Bulldogs (3–5) at Arkansas Razorbacks (2–6)

Quarter	1	2	3	4	Total
Bulldogs	14	24	7	9	54
Razorbacks	0	10	7	7	24

at Donald W. Reynolds Razorback Stadium • Fayetteville, Arkansas

- Date: Saturday, November 2, 2019
- Game time: 3:00 p.m. CDT
- Game weather: Sunny • Temperature: 53 °F (12 °C) • Wind: NNW 9 mph
- Game attendance: 52,256
- Referee: Matt Loeffler
- TV announcers (SEC Network): Taylor Zarzour (play-by-play), Matt Stinchcomb (color), Alyssa Lang (sideline)

Game information

First Quarter

- (12:11) MSST – Kylin Hill 4 yard rush, Jace Christmann kick (Drive: 6 plays, 82 yards, 2:49; Mississippi State 7–0)
- (5:31) MSST – Osirus Mitchell 33 yard pass from Tommy Stevens, Jace Christmann kick (Drive: 11 plays, 80 yards, 5:21; Mississippi State 14–0)

Second Quarter

- (14:04) MSST – Jace Christmann 26 yard field goal (Drive: 11 plays, 68 yards, 4:55; Mississippi State 17–0)
- (10:24) ARK – Rakeem Boyd 52 yard rush, Connor Limpert kick (Drive: 2 plays, 61 yards, 0:57; Mississippi State 17–7)
- (7:55) MSST – Kylin Hill 2 yard rush, Jace Christmann kick (Drive: 6 plays, 75 yards, 2:29; Mississippi State 24–7)
- (5:00) ARK – Connor Limpert 40 yard field goal (Drive: 4 plays, 1 yard, 0:56; Mississippi State 24–10)
- (2:42) MSST – Kylin Hill 1 yard rush, Jace Christmann kick (Drive: 5 plays, 84 yards, 2:18; Mississippi State 31–10)
- (1:59) MSST – Marcus Murphy 32 yard interception return, Jace Christmann kick (Mississippi State 38–10)

Third Quarter

- (10:33) MSST – Farrod Green 3 yard pass from Tommy Stevens, Jace Christmann kick (Drive: 6 plays, 66 yards, 3:09; Mississippi State 45–10)
- (4:03) ARK – Michael Woods II 11 yard pass from John Steven Jones, Connor Limpert kick (Drive: 12 plays, 59 yards, 6:30; Mississippi State 45–17)

Fourth Quarter

- (11:40) MSST – Jace Christmann 46 yard field goal (Drive: 13 plays, 47 yards, 7:23; Mississippi State 48–17)
- (9:47) ARK – KJ Jefferson 5 yard rush, Connor Limpert kick (Drive: 4 plays, 75 yards, 1:53; Mississippi State 48–24)
- (8:22) MSST – Nick Gibson 47 yard rush, 2-pt. rush failed (Drive: 3 plays, 75 yards, 1:25; Mississippi State 54–24)

Statistics	MSST	ARK
First downs	27	10
Total yards	640	285
Rushes–yards	57–460	25–184
Passing yards	180	101
Passing: Comp–Att–Int	13–19–0	9–24–1
Time of possession	40:09	19:51

Team	Category	Player	Statistics
Mississippi State	Passing	Tommy Stevens	12/18, 172 yards, 2 TD
Mississippi State	Rushing	Kylin Hill	21 carries, 234 yards, 3 TD
Mississippi State	Receiving	Deddrick Thomas	2 receptions, 59 yards
Arkansas	Passing	Ben Hicks	4/13, 44 yards, 1 INT
Arkansas	Rushing	Rakeem Boyd	11 carries, 114 yards, 1 TD
Arkansas	Receiving	Treylon Burks	1 reception, 32 yards

=== Western Kentucky ===
Uniform combination
Helmet	Jersey	Pants

Game Ten – Western Kentucky Hilltoppers (5–4) at Arkansas Razorbacks (2–7)

Quarter	1	2	3	4	Total
Hilltoppers	14	21	3	7	45
Razorbacks	7	0	0	12	19

at Donald W. Reynolds Razorback Stadium • Fayetteville, Arkansas

- Date: Saturday, November 9, 2019
- Game time: 11:00 a.m. CDT
- Game weather: Sunny • Temperature: 52 °F (11 °C) • Wind: SW 12 mph
- Game attendance: 42,985
- Referee: David Smith
- TV announcers (SEC Network): Taylor Zarzour (play-by-play), Matt Stinchcomb (color), Alyssa Lang (sideline)

Game information

First Quarter

- (9:30) WKU – Jacquez Sloan 19 yard rush, Cory Munson kick (Drive: 9 plays, 42 yards, 3:45; Western Kentucky 7–0)
- (8:02) ARK – Rakeem Boyd 76 yard rush, Connor Limpert kick (Drive: 4 plays, 88 yards, 1:28; Tied 7–7)
- (1:59) WKU – Ty Storey 9 yard rush, Cory Munson kick (Drive: 12 plays, 75 yards, 6:03; Western Kentucky 14–7)

Second Quarter

- (7:42) WKU – Ty Storey 1 yard rush, Cory Munson kick (Drive: 16 plays, 59 yards, 7:09; Western Kentucky 21–7)
- (6:02) WKU – Jahcour Pearson 69 yard pass from Ty Storey, Cory Munson kick (Drive: 2 plays, 73 yards, 0:38; Western Kentucky 28–8)
- (0:19) WKU – Gaej Walker 1 yard rush, Cory Munson kick (Drive: 12 plays, 68 yards, 3:24; Western Kentucky 35–7)

Third Quarter

- (9:38) WKU – Cory Munson 19 yard field goal (Drive: 7 plays, 67 yards, 2:53; Western Kentucky 38–7)

Fourth Quarter

- (12:21) ARK – Rakeem Boyd 86 yard rush, kick failed (Drive: 2 plays, 86 yards, 0:18; Western Kentucky 38–13)
- (8:20) WKU – Devon Key 25 yard interception return, Cory Munson kick (Western Kentucky 45–13)
- (4:44) ARK – KJ Jefferson 2 yard rush, 2-pt. pass failed (Drive: 9 plays, 70 yards, 3:36; Western Kentucky 45–19)

Statistics	WKU	ARK
First downs	23	12
Total yards	478	340
Rushes–yards	265	253
Passing yards	213	87
Passing: Comp–Att–Int	22–32–0	9–26–2
Time of possession	36:57	23:03

Team	Category	Player	Statistics
Western Kentucky	Passing	Ty Storey	22/32, 213 yards, 1 TD
Western Kentucky	Rushing	Gaej Walker	23 carries, 129 yards, 1 TD
Western Kentucky	Receiving	Jahcour Pearson	10 receptions, 120 yards, 1 TD
Arkansas	Passing	KJ Jefferson	6/15, 60 yards
Arkansas	Rushing	Rakeem Boyd	8 carries, 185 yards, 2 TD
Arkansas	Receiving	Treylon Burks	5 receptions, 59 yards

=== At LSU ===
Uniform combination
Helmet	Jersey	Pants

Game Eleven – Arkansas Razorbacks (2–8) at #1 LSU Tigers (10–0)

Quarter	1	2	3	4	Total
Razorbacks	3	3	0	14	20
No. 1 Tigers	7	21	21	7	56

at Tiger Stadium • Baton Rouge, Louisiana

- Date: Saturday, November 23, 2019
- Game time: 6:00 p.m. CDT
- Game weather: Clear • Temperature: 56 °F (13 °C) • Wind: WNW 4 mph
- Game attendance: 101,173
- Referee: David Smith
- TV announcers (ESPN): Dave Pasch (play-by-play), Greg McElroy (color), Tom Luginbill (sideline)

Game information

First Quarter

- (12:33) LSU – Ja'Marr Chase 37 yard pass from Joe Burrow, Cade York kick (Drive: 6 plays, 75 yards, 2:27; LSU 7–0)
- (3:39) ARK – Connor Limpert 24 yard field goal (Drive: 7 plays, 49 yards, 3:31; LSU 7–3)

Second Quarter

- (9:43) ARK – Connor Limpert 47 yard field goal (Drive: 10 plays, 32 yards, 5:09; LSU 7–6)
- (7:38) LSU – Tyrion Davis-Price 2 yard rush, Cade York kick (Drive: 6 plays, 75 yards, 2:05; LSU 14–6)
- (3:17) LSU – Clyde Edwards-Helaire 27 yard rush, Cade York kick (Drive: 5 plays, 62 yards, 5:00; LSU 21–6)
- (0:14) LSU – Justin Jefferson 10 yard pass from Joe Burrow, Cade York kick (Drive: 9 plays, 90 yards, 1:37; LSU 28–6)

Third Quarter

- (7:48) LSU – Ja'Marr Chase 50 yard pass from Joe Burrow, Cade York kick (Drive: 2 plays, 85 yards, 0:43; LSU 35–6)
- (5:47) LSU – Clyde Edwards-Helaire 26 yard rush, Cade York kick (Drive: 1 play, 26 yards, 0:09; LSU 42–6)
- (2:46) LSU – Clyde Edwards-Helaire 89 yard rush, Cade York kick (Drive: 1 play, 89 yards, 0:26; LSU 49–6)

Fourth Quarter

- (14:52) LSU – John Emery 39 yard rush, Cade York kick (Drive: 5 plays, 67 yards, 1:45; LSU 56–6)
- (8:35) ARK – Michael Woods II 24 yard pass from Jack Lindsey, Connor Limpert kick (Drive: 9 plays, 75 yards, 5:52; LSU 56–13)
- (7:02) ARK – Devwah Whaley 2 yard rush, Connor Limpert kick (Drive: 2 plays, 11 yards, 1:05; LSU 56–20)

Statistics	ARK	LSU
First downs	19	25
Total yards	304	612
Rushes–yards	43–114	16–260
Passing yards	190	352
Passing: Comp–Att–Int	13–28–0	25–32–0
Time of possession	40:54	19:06

Team	Category	Player	Statistics
Arkansas	Passing	KJ Jefferson	7/14, 105 yards
Arkansas	Rushing	Rakeem Boyd	13 carries, 33 yards
Arkansas	Receiving	Treylon Burks	3 receptions, 80 yards
LSU	Passing	Joe Burrow	23/28, 327 yards, 3 TD
LSU	Rushing	Clyde Edwards-Helaire	6 carries, 188 yards, 3 TD
LSU	Receiving	Ja'Marr Chase	6 receptions, 144 yards, 2 TD

=== Missouri ===
Uniform combination
Helmet	Jersey	Pants

Game Twelve – Missouri Tigers (5–6) at Arkansas Razorbacks (2–9)

Quarter	1	2	3	4	Total
Tigers	0	10	7	7	24
Razorbacks	7	0	7	0	14

at War Memorial Stadium • Little Rock, Arkansas

- Date: Friday, November 29, 2019
- Game time: 1:30 p.m. CDT
- Game weather: Cloudy • Temperature: 49 °F (9 °C) • Wind: E 6 mph
- Game attendance: 33,961
- Referee: John McDaid
- TV announcers (CBS): Carter Blackburn (play-by-play), Aaron Taylor and Rick Neuheisel (color), John Schriffen (sideline)

Game information

First Quarter

- (6:49) ARK – Trey Knox 19 yard pass from Jack Lindsey, Connor Limpert kick (Drive: 5 plays, 38 yards, 1:48; Arkansas 7–0)

Second Quarter

- (14:56) MIZ – Larry Rountree 5 yard rush, Tucker McCann kick (Drive: 14 plays, 75 yards, 6:53; Tied 7–7)
- (5:08) MIZ – Tucker McCann 26 yard field goal (Drive: 8 plays, 48 yards, 3:05; Missouri 10–7)

Third Quarter

- (13:34) ARK – Grayson Gunter 10 yard pass from Jack Lindsey, Connor Limpert kick (Drive: 3 plays, 26 yards, 1:21; Arkansas 14–10)
- (7:00) MIZ – Tyler Badie 3 yard rush, Tucker McCann kick (Drive: 8 plays, 84 yards, 2:54; Missouri 17–14)

Fourth Quarter

- (8:47) MIZ – Jonathan Nance 10 yard pass from Taylor Powell, Tucker McCann kick (Drive: 8 plays, 64 yards, 2:38; Missouri 24–14)

Statistics	MIZ	ARK
First downs	20	16
Total yards	329	242
Rushes–yards	47–144	31–165
Passing yards	185	77
Passing: Comp–Att–Int	15–23–1	11–31–0
Time of possession	31:30	29:30

Team	Category	Player	Statistics
Missouri	Passing	Taylor Powell	8/14, 105 yards, 1 TD, 1 INT
Missouri	Rushing	Larry Rountree III	24 carries, 88 yards
Missouri	Receiving	Barre Banister	6 receptions, 60 yards
Arkansas	Passing	Jack Lindsey	10/26, 75 yards, 2 TD
Arkansas	Rushing	Rakeem Boyd	21 carries, 95 yards
Arkansas	Receiving	Michael Woods II	2 receptions, 26 yards

== Statistics ==
- The statistics section was last updated on November 9, following Arkansas' game against Western Kentucky.

=== Team ===
Stat	Arkansas	Opponents
Total Scoring	257	362
Points per Game	21.4	36.2
First Downs	219	226
Rushing	80	107
Passing	111	103
Penalty	28	16
Total Offense	4,081	4,467
Rushing	1,766	2,254
Passing	2,315	2,213
Avg per Game	340.1	446.7
Rushing Att–Avg/Rush–TD	376 – 4.7 – 14	423 – 5.3 – 22
Passing Comp–Att–TD–Int	202–407–14–15	187–286–21–5

Stat	Arkansas	Opponents
Fumbles–Lost	12–6	15–9
Penalties–Yards	47–392	58–528
Avg penalty yds per Game	39.2	52.8
Punts–Yards	47–1,850	36–1,640
Avg per Punt	39.4	45.6
3rd Down Conversions	46–135	62–135
4th Down Conversions	7–16	9–15
Touchdowns Scored	27	46
Points off Turnovers	44	73
PATs–Attempts (2pt–Attempts)	25–26 (0–1)	44–45 (0–1)
Field Goals–Attempts (Long)	12–15 (54)	14–18 (50)

==== Scores by quarter ====
	1	2	3	4	Total
Arkansas	48	3	17	50	118
Non-conference opponents	38	51	13	21	123

	1	2	3	4	Total
Arkansas	7	36	24	38	105
SEC opponents	62	72	45	60	239

	1	2	3	4	Total
Arkansas	55	39	41	88	223
All opponents	100	123	58	81	362

=== Offense ===
==== Game-by-game offense ====
	Passing					Rushing				Receiving							
	Hicks	Starkel	Jones	Jefferson	Lindsey	Boyd	Hayden	Warren	Whaley	Boyd	Burks	Hayden	Gunter	Knox	Morris	O'Grady	Woods
PRST	143	48	–	–	–	114	28	–	21	22	52	4	16	38	15	–	30
MISS	98	201	–	–	–	67	–6	12	2	8	28	–4	–	88	8	45	84
CSU	–	305	–	–	–	122	17	2	81	–	92	12	–	90	9	74	10
SJSU	–	356	–	–	–	91	–	–	32	10	–	–	–	83	60	33	115
A&M	188	109	–	–	–	89	–	–	12	10	58	–	–	–	26	91	62
UK	81	41	–	–	–	134	–	–	42	–	25	–	–	24	11	44	18
AUB	182	–	–	–	–	39	–	–	12	26	28	–	–	34	8	72	–
BAMA	–	58	50	–	50	–	–	40	55	15	–	–	–	–	13	–	–
MSST	44	–	25	32	–	114	–	–	12	–	32	–	23	9	18	–	15
WKU	–	–	27	60	185	–	–	2	–	59	–	–	–	–	–	16	–
LSU	–	34	–	105	51	33	–	–	8	27	80	–	–	–	–	–	47
MIZ	2	–	–	–	75	95	–	–	14	2	6	–	16	19	–	–	26

Statistical leader

== Players drafted into the NFL ==
Round	Pick	Player	Position	NFL club
3	95	McTelvin Agim	DT	Denver Broncos
7	216	Kamren Curl	S	Washington Redskins
