= 2019 Texas A&M Aggies football team =

American college football season

2019 Texas A&M Aggies football

Texas Bowl champion

Texas Bowl, W 24–21 vs. Oklahoma State
- Conference: Southeastern Conference
- Western Division
- Record: 8–5 (4–4 SEC)
- Head coach: Jimbo Fisher (2nd season)
- Offensive coordinator: Darrell Dickey (2nd season)
- Offensive scheme: Pro-style
- Defensive coordinator: Mike Elko (2nd season)
- Base defense: 4–2–5
- Home stadium: Kyle Field

Uniform
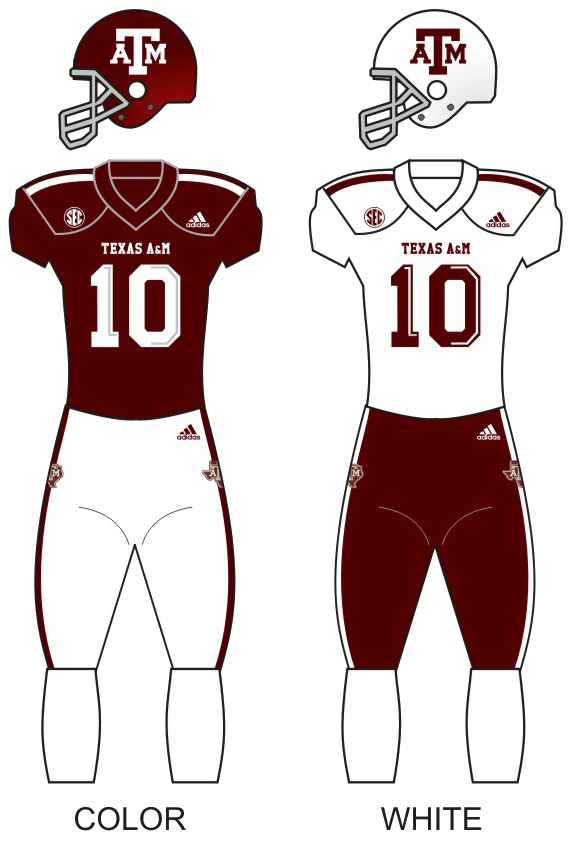

2019 Southeastern Conference football standings
	Conf.			Overall
Team	W		L	W		L
Eastern Division
No. 4 Georgia x	7	–	1	12	–	2
No. 6 Florida	6	–	2	11	–	2
Tennessee *	5	–	3	8	–	5
Kentucky	3	–	5	8	–	5
Missouri *	3	–	5	6	–	6
South Carolina	3	–	5	4	–	8
Vanderbilt	1	–	7	3	–	9
Western Division
No. 1 LSU x$#^	8	–	0	15	–	0
No. 8 Alabama	6	–	2	11	–	2
No. 14 Auburn	5	–	3	9	–	4
Texas A&M	4	–	4	8	–	5
Mississippi State	3	–	5	6	–	7
Ole Miss	2	–	6	4	–	8
Arkansas	0	–	8	2	–	10
Championship: LSU 37, Georgia 10
# – College Football Playoff champion; ^ – College Football Playoff participant; $ – Conference champion; x – Division champion/co-champions; * – Tennessee vacated all wins due to NCAA violations. Missouri was ineligible for postseason due to NCAA sanctions.; Rankings from AP Poll

The 2019 Texas A&M Aggies football team represented Texas A&M University in the 2019 NCAA Division I FBS football season. The Aggies played their home games at Kyle Field in College Station, Texas, and competed in the Western Division of the Southeastern Conference (SEC). They were led by second-year head coach Jimbo Fisher.

== Preseason ==
=== SEC media poll ===
The SEC media poll was released on July 19, 2019 with the Aggies predicted to finish in third place in the West Division.

== Schedule ==
Texas A&M announced its 2019 football schedule on September 18, 2018. The 2019 schedule consisted of 7 home, 4 away, and 1 neutral game in the regular season.

Date	Time	Opponent	Rank	Site	TV	Result	Attendance
August 29	7:30 p.m.	Texas State*	No. 12	Kyle Field; College Station, TX	SECN	W 41–7	98,016
September 7	2:30 p.m.	at No. 1 Clemson*	No. 12	Memorial Stadium; Clemson, SC	ABC	L 10–24	81,500
September 14	6:00 p.m.	Lamar*	No. 16	Kyle Field; College Station, TX	ESPNU	W 62–3	97,195
September 21	2:30 p.m.	No. 8 Auburn	No. 17	Kyle Field; College Station, TX (SEC Nation)	CBS	L 20–28	101,681
September 28	11:00 a.m.	vs. Arkansas	No. 23	AT&T Stadium; Arlington, TX (Southwest Classic)	ESPN	W 31–27	51,441
October 12	2:30 p.m.	No. 1 Alabama	No. 24	Kyle Field; College Station, TX	CBS	L 28–47	106,749
October 19	6:30 p.m.	at Ole Miss		Vaught–Hemingway Stadium; Oxford, MS	SECN	W 24–17	50,257
October 26	11:00 a.m.	Mississippi State		Kyle Field; College Station, TX	SECN	W 49–30	102,025
November 2	11:00 a.m.	UTSA*		Kyle Field; College Station, TX	SECN	W 45–14	100,635
November 16	6:30 p.m.	South Carolina		Kyle Field; College Station, TX	SECN	W 30–6	104,957
November 23	2:30 p.m.	at No. 4 Georgia		Sanford Stadium; Athens, GA (SEC Nation)	CBS	L 13–19	92,746
November 30	6:00 p.m.	at No. 2 LSU		Tiger Stadium; Baton Rouge, LA (rivalry)	ESPN	L 7–50	102,218
December 27	5:45 p.m.	vs. No. 25 Oklahoma State*		NRG Stadium; Houston, TX (Texas Bowl)	ESPN	W 24–21	68,415
*Non-conference game; Rankings from AP Poll and CFP Rankings after November 5 released prior to game; All times are in Central time

== Roster ==
2019 Texas A&M Aggies football team roster
Players
Coaches
Offense

Pos.	#	Name	Class
WR	1	Quartney Davis	Jr
WR	2	Jhamon Ausbon	Jr
RB	7	Jashaun Corbin	So
QB	11	Kellen Mond	Jr
WR	13	Kendrick Rogers	Jr
WR	17	Ainias Smith	Fr
RB	21	Deneric Prince	So
RB	23	Jacob Kibodi	Jr
RB	28	Isaiah Spiller	Fr
OL	55	Kenyon Green	Fr
OL	64	Layden Robinson	Fr
OL	65	Dan Moore	Jr
OL	74	Kellen Diesch	Jr
OL	77	Ryan McCollum	Jr
TE	85	Jalen Wydermyer	Fr
TE	88	Baylor Cupp	Fr

Defense

Pos.	#	Name	Class
LB	1	Buddy Johnson	Jr
DL	5	Bobby Brown III	So
DL	8	DeMarvin Leal	Fr
DB	9	Leon O'Neal Jr.	So
DL	15	Jeremiah Martin	So
DL	40	Tyree Wilson	So
DL	52	Justin Madubuike	Jr
DL	91	Michael Clemons	Jr
DL	92	Jayden Peevy	Jr

Special teams

Pos.	#	Name	Class
P	34	Braden Mann	Sr
K	36	Caden Davis	Fr
K	47	Seth Small	So
P	95	Nik Constantinou	Fr

Head coach

- Jimbo Fisher

Coordinators/assistant coaches

- Dameyune Craig – Wide receivers
- Darrell Dickey – Offensive coordinator/quarterbacks
- Mike Elko – Defensive coordinator/safeties
- Joe Jon Finley – Tight ends
- Jay Graham – Running backs
- Josh Henson – Offensive line
- Maurice Linguist – Cornerbacks
- Bradley Dale Peveto – Special teams coordinator/linebackers
- Terry Price – Defensive ends
- Elijah Robinson – Interior defensive line
- Luke Huard – Offensive analyst
- Jerry Schmidt – Strength and conditioning
- Brandon Bailey – Defensive Graduate assistant
- Bert Biffani – Offensive Graduate assistant
- Sean Maguire – Offensive Graduate assistant
- Robert Wright – Offensive Graduate assistant

Legend

- (C) Team captain
- (S) Suspended
- (I) Ineligible
- Injured
- Redshirt

Roster

== Coaching staff ==
Name	Position	Season at Texas A&M
Jimbo Fisher	Head coach	2nd
Darrell Dickey	Offensive coordinator and Quarterbacks coach	2nd
Joe Jon Finley	Tight ends coach	1st
Dameyune Craig	Wide receivers coach	2nd
Jay Graham	Running backs coach	2nd
Josh Henson	Offensive line coach	1st
Mike Elko	Defensive coordinator and safeties coach	2nd
Maurice Linguist	Cornerbacks coach	2nd
Terry Price	Defensive ends coach	8th
Elijah Robinson	Interior defensive line coach	2nd
Bradley Dale Peveto	Special teams coordinator and linebackers coach	2nd
Luke Huard	Offensive analyst	1st
Jerry Schmidt	Strength and conditioning coach	2nd
Sean Maguire	Offensive Graduate Assistant	2nd
Brandon Bailey	Defensive Graduate Assistant	1st
Robert Wright	Offensive Graduate Assistant	1st
Bert Biffani	Offensive Graduate Assistant	1st

== Game summaries ==
=== Texas State ===
	1	2	3	4	Total
Bobcats	0	0	0	7	7
No. 12 Aggies	14	14	3	10	41

Statistics

Statistics	Texas State	Texas A&M
First downs	15	22
Total yards	219	478
Rushing yards	8	246
Passing yards	211	232
Turnovers	4	2
Time of possession	24:14	35:46

Team	Category	Player	Statistics
Texas State	Passing	Gresch Jensen	20–31, 160 yards, TD, 2 INT
Texas State	Rushing	A.D. Taylor	7 carries, 19 yards
Texas State	Receiving	Hutch White	7 receptions, 60 yards
Texas A&M	Passing	Kellen Mond	19–27, 194 yards, 3 TD, INT
Texas A&M	Rushing	Isaiah Spiller	7 carries, 106 yards
Texas A&M	Receiving	Quartney Davis	6 receptions, 85 yards, TD

=== At Clemson ===
	1	2	3	4	Total
No. 12 Aggies	0	3	0	7	10
No. 1 Tigers	0	17	7	0	24

Statistics

Statistics	Texas A&M	Clemson
First downs	18	26
Total yards	289	389
Rushing yards	53	121
Passing yards	236	268
Turnovers	2	1
Time of possession	32:36	27:24

Team	Category	Player	Statistics
Texas A&M	Passing	Kellen Mond	24–42, 236 yards, TD, INT
Texas A&M	Rushing	Jashaun Corbin	13 carries, 34 yards
Texas A&M	Receiving	Jhamon Ausbon	7 receptions, 69 yards
Clemson	Passing	Trevor Lawrence	24–35, 268 yards, TD, INT
Clemson	Rushing	Lyn-J Dixon	11 carries, 79 yards, TD
Clemson	Receiving	Justyn Ross	7 receptions, 94 yards, TD

=== Lamar ===
	1	2	3	4	Total
Cardinals	0	0	3	0	3
No. 16 Aggies	13	14	21	14	62

Statistics

Statistics	Lamar	Texas A&M
First downs	9	35
Total yards	197	633
Rushing yards	122	223
Passing yards	75	410
Turnovers	1	2
Time of possession	25:41	34:19

Team	Category	Player	Statistics
Lamar	Passing	Jordan Hoy	10–24, 75 yards
Lamar	Rushing	Myles Wanza	8 carries, 53 yards
Lamar	Receiving	Mason Sikes	1 reception, 16 yards
Texas A&M	Passing	Kellen Mond	20–28, 317 yards, TD, INT
Texas A&M	Rushing	Isaiah Spiller	14 carries, 116 yards, 2 TD
Texas A&M	Receiving	Jhamon Ausbon	4 receptions, 109 yards, TD

=== Auburn ===
	1	2	3	4	Total
No. 8 Tigers	14	0	7	7	28
No. 17 Aggies	0	3	0	17	20

Statistics

Statistics	Auburn	Texas A&M
First downs	16	23
Total yards	299	391
Rushing yards	193	56
Passing yards	106	335
Turnovers	0	1
Time of possession	28:22	31:38

Team	Category	Player	Statistics
Auburn	Passing	Bo Nix	12–20, 100 yards, TD
Auburn	Rushing	JaTarvious Whitlow	18 carries, 67 yards, TD
Auburn	Receiving	Seth Williams	4 receptions, 47 yards, TD
Texas A&M	Passing	Kellen Mond	31–49, 335 yards, 2 TD
Texas A&M	Rushing	Kellen Mond	9 carries, 25 yards
Texas A&M	Receiving	Jhamon Ausbon	8 receptions, 111 yards

=== Vs. Arkansas ===
	1	2	3	4	Total
Razorbacks	0	17	7	3	27
No. 23 Aggies	7	14	0	10	31

Statistics

Statistics	Arkansas	Texas A&M
First downs	26	24
Total yards	395	340
Rushing yards	98	89
Passing yards	297	251
Turnovers	1	2
Time of possession	27:33	32:37

Team	Category	Player	Statistics
Arkansas	Passing	Ben Hicks	15–27, 188 yards, TD
Arkansas	Rushing	Rakeem Boyd	18 carries, 89 yards
Arkansas	Receiving	Cheyenne O'Grady	8 receptions, 91 yards
Texas A&M	Passing	Kellen Mond	23–35, 251 yards, 3 TD, INT
Texas A&M	Rushing	Jacob Kibodi	9 carries, 38 yards
Texas A&M	Receiving	Jhamon Ausbon	7 receptions, 82 yards

=== Alabama ===
	1	2	3	4	Total
No. 1 Crimson Tide	14	10	10	13	47
No. 24 Aggies	7	6	7	8	28

Statistics

Statistics	Alabama	Texas A&M
First downs	25	24
Total yards	448	389
Rushing yards	155	125
Passing yards	293	264
Turnovers	1	1
Time of possession	30:56	29:04

Team	Category	Player	Statistics
Alabama	Passing	Tua Tagovailoa	21–34, 293 yards, 4 TD, INT
Alabama	Rushing	Najee Harris	20 carries, 114 yards
Alabama	Receiving	DeVonta Smith	7 receptions, 99 yards, TD
Texas A&M	Passing	Kellen Mond	24–42, 264 yards, 2 TD
Texas A&M	Rushing	Kellen Mond	16 carries, 90 yards, TD
Texas A&M	Receiving	Quartney Davis	7 receptions, 81 yards

=== At Ole Miss ===
	1	2	3	4	Total
Aggies	3	7	7	7	24
Rebels	7	0	7	3	17

Statistics

Statistics	Texas A&M	Ole Miss
First downs	20	22
Total yards	337	405
Rushing yards	165	250
Passing yards	172	155
Turnovers	2	2
Time of possession	34:07	25:53

Team	Category	Player	Statistics
Texas A&M	Passing	Kellen Mond	16–28, 172 yards, TD, INT
Texas A&M	Rushing	Isaiah Spiller	16 carries, 78 yards, TD
Texas A&M	Receiving	Jalen Wydermyer	4 receptions, 67 yards
Ole Miss	Passing	Matt Corral	10–17, 124 yards, INT
Ole Miss	Rushing	Jerrion Ealy	6 carries, 80 yards, TD
Ole Miss	Receiving	Elijah Moore	5 receptions, 59 yards

=== Mississippi State ===
	1	2	3	4	Total
Bulldogs	0	10	7	13	30
Aggies	14	14	14	7	49

Statistics

Statistics	Mississippi State	Texas A&M
First downs	22	24
Total yards	433	441
Rushing yards	239	207
Passing yards	194	234
Turnovers	3	0
Time of possession	28:12	31:48

Team	Category	Player	Statistics
Mississippi State	Passing	Garrett Shrader	13–30, 194 yards, 3 TD, INT
Mississippi State	Rushing	Kylin Hill	21 carries, 150 yards, TD
Mississippi State	Receiving	Stephen Guidry	2 receptions, 59 yards, TD
Texas A&M	Passing	Kellen Mond	17–23, 234 yards, 3 TD
Texas A&M	Rushing	Isaiah Spiller	22 carries, 90 yards, TD
Texas A&M	Receiving	Jalen Wydermyer	2 receptions, 63 yards, TD

=== UTSA ===
	1	2	3	4	Total
Roadrunners	7	0	0	7	14
Aggies	14	7	14	10	45

Statistics

Statistics	UTSA	Texas A&M
First downs	14	23
Total yards	231	505
Rushing yards	93	267
Passing yards	138	238
Turnovers	1	1
Time of possession	24:17	35:43

Team	Category	Player	Statistics
UTSA	Passing	Lowell Narcisse	7–14, 90 yards
UTSA	Rushing	Lowell Narcisse	15 carries, 54 yards, TD
UTSA	Receiving	Zakhari Franklin	4 receptions, 46 yards
Texas A&M	Passing	Kellen Mond	16–21, 211 yards, TD
Texas A&M	Rushing	Isaiah Spiller	20 carries, 217 yards, 3 TD
Texas A&M	Receiving	Jhamon Ausbon	5 receptions, 90 yards

=== South Carolina ===
	1	2	3	4	Total
Gamecocks	3	0	0	3	6
Aggies	3	10	0	17	30

Statistics

Statistics	South Carolina	Texas A&M
First downs	15	27
Total yards	260	540
Rushing yards	45	319
Passing yards	215	221
Turnovers	0	1
Time of possession	18:21	41:39

Team	Category	Player	Statistics
South Carolina	Passing	Ryan Hilinski	16–41, 175 yards
South Carolina	Rushing	Rico Dowdle	7 carries, 12 yards
South Carolina	Receiving	Kyle Markway	5 receptions, 47 yards
Texas A&M	Passing	Kellen Mond	20–33, 221 yards, TD
Texas A&M	Rushing	Cordarrian Richardson	6 carries, 130 yards, TD
Texas A&M	Receiving	Jalen Wydermyer	5 receptions, 79 yards

=== At Georgia ===
	1	2	3	4	Total
Aggies	0	3	3	7	13
No. 4 Bulldogs	3	10	3	3	19

Statistics

Statistics	Texas A&M	Georgia
First downs	16	12
Total yards	274	260
Rushing yards	-1	97
Passing yards	275	163
Turnovers	1	0
Time of possession	31:34	28:26

Team	Category	Player	Statistics
Texas A&M	Passing	Kellen Mond	25-42, 275 yards, TD
Texas A&M	Rushing	Isaiah Spiller	11 carries, 7 yards
Texas A&M	Receiving	Jhamon Ausbon	9 receptions, 96 yards, TD
Georgia	Passing	Jake Fromm	11-23, 163 yards, TD
Georgia	Rushing	D'Andre Swift	19 carries, 103 yards
Georgia	Receiving	George Pickens	2 receptions, 57 yards, TD

=== At LSU ===
	1	2	3	4	Total
Aggies	0	0	7	0	7
No. 2 Tigers	21	10	10	9	50

Statistics

Statistics	Texas A&M	LSU
First downs	12	31
Total yards	169	553
Rushing yards	72	128
Passing yards	97	425
Turnovers	3	0
Time of possession	25:22	34:38

Team	Category	Player	Statistics
Texas A&M	Passing	Kellen Mond	10–30, 92 yards, 3 INT
Texas A&M	Rushing	Isaiah Spiller	11 carries, 66 yards, TD
Texas A&M	Receiving	Isaiah Spiller	3 receptions, 45 yards
LSU	Passing	Joe Burrow	23–32, 352 yards, 3 TD
LSU	Rushing	Clyde Edwards-Helaire	18 carries, 87 yards, TD
LSU	Receiving	Ja'Marr Chase	7 receptions, 197 yards, 2 TD

=== Vs. Oklahoma State (Texas Bowl) ===
	1	2	3	4	Total
No. 25 Cowboys	14	0	0	7	21
Aggies	0	7	7	10	24

Statistics

Statistics	Oklahoma State	Texas A&M
First downs	17	19
Total yards	334	343
Rushing yards	150	248
Passing yards	184	95
Turnovers	0	2
Time of possession	25:47	34:13

Team	Category	Player	Statistics
Oklahoma State	Passing	Dru Brown	15–28, 184 yards, 2 TD
Oklahoma State	Rushing	Chuba Hubbard	19 carries, 158 yards
Oklahoma State	Receiving	Braydon Johnson	5 receptions, 124 yards, 2 TD
Texas A&M	Passing	Kellen Mond	13–19, 95 yards, TD
Texas A&M	Rushing	Kellen Mond	12 carries, 117 yards, TD
Texas A&M	Receiving	Quartney Davis	6 receptions, 48 yards

== Rankings ==
Ranking movements Legend: ██ Increase in ranking ██ Decrease in ranking — = Not ranked RV = Received votes т = Tied with team above or below
	Week																
Poll	Pre	1	2	3	4	5	6	7	8	9	10	11	12	13	14	15	Final
AP	12	12	16	17	23	25-T	24	RV	RV	RV	RV	RV	24	RV	—	RV	RV
Coaches	11	11	15	15	21	21	21	RV	RV	RV	RV	RV	24	RV	—	—	RV
CFP	Not released										—	—	—	—	—	—	Not released

== Players drafted into the NFL ==
Texas A&M had two players selected in the 2020 NFL draft.

Round	Pick	Player	Position	NFL cClub
3	71	Justin Madubuike	DT	Baltimore Ravens
6	191	Braden Mann	P	New York Jets
