= 2019 Music City Bowl =

Postseason college football bowl game

2019 Franklin American Mortgage Music City Bowl
- 22nd Music City Bowl
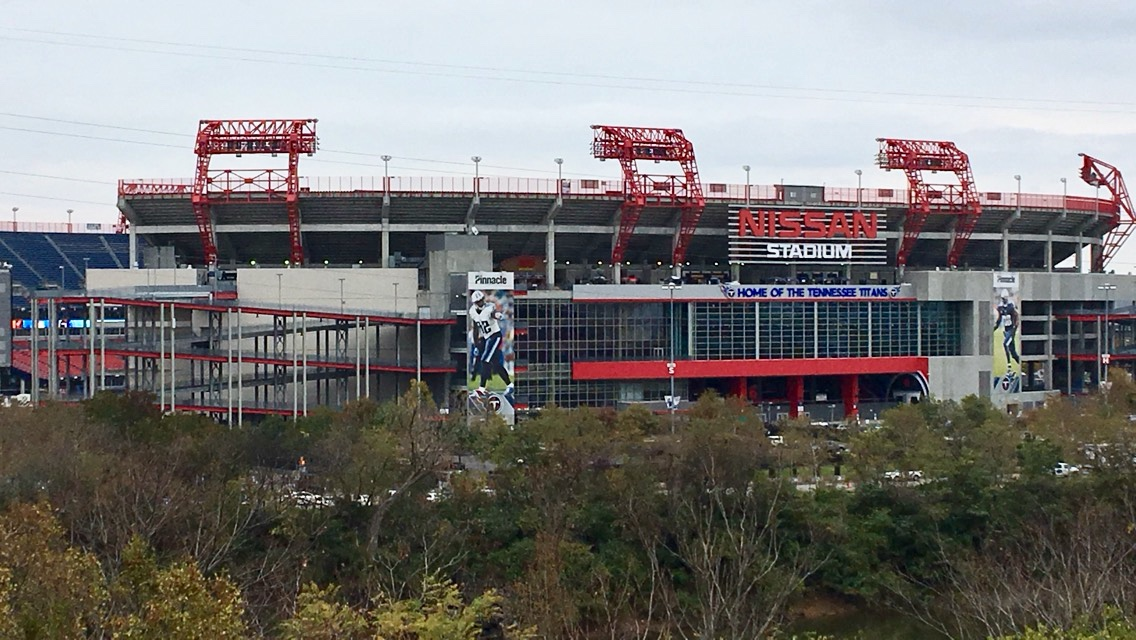
- Nissan Stadium in Nashville, Tennessee, hosted the Music City Bowl.
Mississippi State Bulldogs	Louisville Cardinals
(6–6)	(7–5)
SEC	ACC
28	38
Head coach: Joe Moorhead	Head coach: Scott Satterfield
	1	2	3	4	Total
Mississippi State	7	7	0	14	28
Louisville	0	10	14	14	38
- Date: December 30, 2019
- Season: 2019
- Stadium: Nissan Stadium
- Location: Nashville, Tennessee
- MVP: Malik Cunningham (QB, Louisville)
- Favorite: Mississippi State by 4.5
- Referee: Mark Duddy (Pac-12)
- Attendance: 46,850
- Payout: US$5,700,000

United States TV coverage
- Network: ESPN & ESPN Radio
- Announcers: ESPN: Tom Hart (play-by-play), Jordan Rodgers (analyst) and Cole Cubelic (sideline); ESPN Radio: Dave O'Brien (play-by-play), Mike Golic Jr. (analyst) and Jerry Punch (sideline)

The 2019 Music City Bowl was a college football bowl game played on December 30, 2019, with kickoff at 4:00 p.m. EST (3:00 p.m. local CDT) on ESPN. The 22nd edition of the Music City Bowl featured Southeastern Conference member Mississippi State and Atlantic Coast Conference member Louisville, and was one of the 2019–20 bowl games concluding the 2019 FBS football season. Sponsored by the Franklin American Mortgage Company, the game was officially known as the Franklin American Mortgage Music City Bowl.

== Teams ==
The 2019 Music City Bowl was contested by the Mississippi State Bulldogs and the Louisville Cardinals. The teams had met five times previously, with Mississippi State holding a 3–2 edge in the series. Louisville's two wins came via forfeit, as the Bulldogs were forced to forfeit all their wins in 1975 and 1976 for fielding a player who was later ruled ineligible. The teams had last met in the 2017 TaxSlayer Bowl, won by the Bulldogs, 31–27.

=== Mississippi State Bulldogs ===
The Bulldogs entered the bowl with a 6–6 record (3–5 in conference); they finished in fifth place of the SEC's West Division. This was Mississippi State's second Music City Bowl; their 2011 team won that season's Music City Bowl over Wake Forest, 23–17. This was the 10th consecutive bowl appearance for the Bulldogs, dating back to their 2010 season. This was Mississippi State's 23rd overall bowl game in program history.

Head coach Joe Moorhead had initially named true freshman Garrett Shrader the starting quarterback for the game, but he was injured prior to the game, resulting in Tommy Stevens (a graduate transfer from Penn State) getting the start.

=== Louisville Cardinals ===
Louisville entered the bowl with a 7–5 record (5–3 in conference), including an upset win against No. 19 Wake Forest by three points on October 12. The Cardinals finished in second place in the ACC's Atlantic Division. This was Louisville's second Music City Bowl; their 2015 team won that season's Music City Bowl over Texas A&M, 27–21. This was the first bowl game for the Cardinals since 2017, and the 23rd overall bowl game for the program.

== Game summary ==
2019 Franklin American Mortgage Music City Bowl

Quarter	1	2	3	4	Total
Mississippi State	7	7	0	14	28
Louisville	0	10	14	14	38

at Nissan Stadium • Nashville, Tennessee

- Date: Monday, December 30, 2019
- Game time: 4:00 p.m. EST (3:00 p.m. CST)
- Game weather: Sunny • Temperature: 53 °F (12 °C) • Wind: SW 12 mph
- Game attendance: 46,850
- Referee: Mark Duddy
- TV announcers (ESPN): Tom Hart (play-by-play), Jordan Rodgers (analyst) and Cole Cubelic (sideline)
- ESPN game summary

Game information

First Quarter

- (4:48) MSST – Tommy Stevens 3 yard rush, Jace Christmann kick (Drive: 8 plays, 99 yards, 4:10; Mississippi State 7–0)

Second Quarter

- (10:19) MSST – Nick Gibson 3 yard rush, Jace Christmann kick (Drive: 10 plays, 80 yards, 3:49; Mississippi State 14–0)
- (7:57) LOU – Tutu Atwell 33 yard pass to Marshon Ford, Ryan Chalifoux kick (Drive: 5 plays, 72 yards, 2:30; Mississippi State 14–7)
- (0:00) LOU – Ryan Chalifoux 31 yard field goal (Drive: 10 plays, 50 yards, 3:14; Mississippi State 14–10)

Third Quarter

- (5:01) LOU – Malik Cunningham 24 yard pass to Devante Peete, Ryan Chalifoux kick (Drive: 7 plays, 56 yards, 2:07; Louisville 17–14)
- (2:51) LOU – Khane Pass 31 yard fumble return, Ryan Chalifoux kick (Louisville 24–14)

Fourth Quarter

- (13:52) LOU – Malik Cunningham 8 yard pass to Marshon Ford, Ryan Chalifoux kick (Drive: 6 plays, 65 yards, 2:30; Louisville 31–14)
- (10:25) MSST – Tommy Stevens 18 yard pass to Stephen Guidry, Jace Christmann kick (Drive: 9 plays, 75 yards, 3:27; Louisville 31–21)
- (2:13) LOU – Javian Hawkins 5 yard rush, Ryan Chalifoux kick (Drive: 6 plays, 52 yards, 1:47; Louisville 38–21)
- (0:27) MSST – Tommy Stevens 24 yard pass to Osirus Mitchell, Jace Christmann kick (Drive: 7 plays, 86 yards, 1:46; Louisville 38–28)

=== Statistics ===
Statistics	MSST	LOU
First downs	24	23
Plays–yards	62–366	69–510
Rushes–yards	36–145	44–198
Passing yards	221	312
Passing: comp–att–int	17–26–0	17–25–0
Time of possession	28:26	31:34

Team	Category	Player	Statistics
Mississippi State	Passing	Tommy Stevens	17/26, 221 yards, 2 TD
Mississippi State	Rushing	Tommy Stevens	17 carries, 71 yards, 1 TD
Mississippi State	Receiving	Stephen Guidry	6 receptions, 76 yards, 1 TD
Louisville	Passing	Malik Cunningham	16/23, 279 yards, 2 TD
Louisville	Rushing	Javian Hawkins	23 carries, 105 yards, 1 TD
Louisville	Receiving	Tutu Atwell	9 receptions, 147 yards
