= Stephen Guidry =

Stephen Guidry may refer to:

- Stephen Guidry (American football) (born 1997), American football wide receiver
- Stephen Guidry (The Cassettes), a member of the musical group The Cassettes
