= Scott Satterfield =

American football player and coach (born 1972)

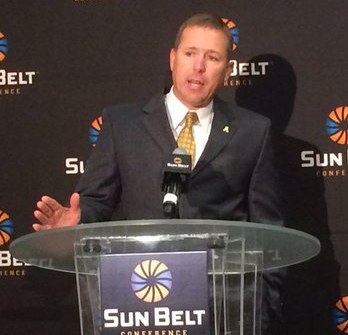
- Satterfield at 2015 Sun Belt Media Day

Current position
- Title: Head coach
- Team: Cincinnati
- Conference: Big 12
- Record: 21–27

Biographical details
- Born: December 21, 1972 (age 53); Hillsborough, North Carolina, U.S.

Playing career
- 1991–1995: Appalachian State
- Position: Quarterback

Coaching career (HC unless noted)
- 1998: Appalachian State (WR)
- 1999–2002: Appalachian State (RB)
- 2003–2008: Appalachian State (QB)
- 2009: Toledo (PGC/QB)
- 2010–2011: FIU (OC/QB)
- 2012: Appalachian State (AHC/OC/QB)
- 2013–2018: Appalachian State
- 2019–2022: Louisville
- 2023–present: Cincinnati

Head coaching record
- Overall: 97–75
- Bowls: 4–2

Accomplishments and honors

Championships
- 3 Sun Belt (2016–2018); Sun Belt East Division (2018)

Awards
- Sun Belt Coach of the Year (2018); ACC Coach of the Year (2019)

Fredric Scott Satterfield (born December 21, 1972) is an American college football coach and former player. He is the head football coach at the University of Cincinnati, a position he has held since the 2023 season. Satterfield served as the head football coach at Appalachian State University from 2013 to 2018 and the University of Louisville from 2019 to 2022.

== Playing career ==
Satterfield played quarterback for Orange High School, located in Hillsborough, North Carolina, from 1989 to 1991. He attended Appalachian State from 1991 to 1996 and started 27 games at quarterback from 1992 to 1995 under Coach Jerry Moore. As a senior in 1995, Satterfield led the Mountaineers to an undefeated regular season and the quarter final of the NCAA Division I-AA playoffs, where they lost to Stephen F. Austin State University. He earned first-team all-conference honors as a senior.

Satterfield graduated from Appalachian State in 1996 with a degree in physical education.

== Coaching career ==
=== Assistant coaching career ===
He joined the Appalachian staff as receivers coach in 1998 before mentoring running backs (1999–2002) and quarterbacks (2002–2008), serving an important role in the university's transition from power-I to spread-formation offense. He was primary signal-caller from 2004 to 2009, directing a team that consistently ranked in the top ten in five different NCAA I-AA categories: scoring, rushing, passing, passing efficiency and total offense. He spent one year at the University of Toledo as quarterbacks coach and passing game coordinator and a two-year stint at Florida International University as offensive coordinator before returning to his alma mater in a similar role in 2012.

=== Appalachian State ===
After head coach Jerry Moore was not retained following the 2012 season, Satterfield was promoted to head coach. Satterfield led the Mountaineers through one of the most successful FCS to FBS transitions leading them to three Sun Belt Conference championships and four years of bowl game eligibility with 3/4 wins accredited to him. Satterfield resigned prior to the 2018 New Orleans Bowl to become the head coach at The University of Louisville for the 2019 football season.

=== Louisville ===
Satterfield had a successful first season at Louisville, with his 2019 team going 8–5 overall and winning the 2019 Music City Bowl over Mississippi State, earning him the ACC Coach of the Year Award.

The next three seasons were more of a mixed result, going 4–7 in 2020 and 6–7 with a bowl loss in 2021. In what would be his last season in Louisville, the 2022 Cardinals began the year 2–3 before turning around the season, briefly being ranked No. 25, and finishing with a 7–5 regular season record.

Satterfield would leave Louisville for Cincinnati with a 25–24 overall record and having led the team to 3 bowl appearances.

=== Cincinnati ===
On December 5, 2022, Satterfield was named the head coach of Cincinnati. On September 16, 2023, Satterfield's Bearcats were defeated by the Miami (OH) RedHawks, UC's first loss to their in-state rival in 16 years. On November 11, 2023, Satterfield led Cincinnati to their first-ever conference win as a member of Big 12 Conference when the Bearcats defeated the Houston Cougars 24–14. Cincinnati made a hot start to the 2025 season, posting a 7–1 record that included a win over #14 Iowa State. This led to the Bearcats being ranked in the AP and Coaches' Poll for the first time since 2022, and bowl eligibility for the first time under Satterfield. However, the Bearcats went on to lose the remaining five games including a Liberty Bowl loss to Navy to round out the season at 7–6.

== Head coaching record ==
Year	Team	Overall	Conference	Standing	Bowl/playoffs
Appalachian State Mountaineers (Southern Conference) (2013)
2013	Appalachian State	4–8	4–4	T–4th (Note: Appalachian State was not eligible for the Southern Conference football title or FCS playoffs as a transitional team to the Football Bowl Subdivision.)	
Appalachian State Mountaineers (Sun Belt Conference) (2014–2018)
2014	Appalachian State	7–5	6–2	3rd (Note: Appalachian State was not eligible for the Sun Belt title or a bowl game as a transitional team to the Football Bowl Subdivision.)	
2015	Appalachian State	11–2	7–1	2nd	W Camellia
2016	Appalachian State	10–3	7–1	T–1st	W Camellia
2017	Appalachian State	9–4	7–1	T–1st	W Dollar General
2018	Appalachian State	10–2	7–1	T–1st (East)	New Orleans*
Appalachian State:		51–24	38–10	*resigned prior to bowl game	
Louisville Cardinals (Atlantic Coast Conference) (2019–2022)
2019	Louisville	8–5	5–3	2nd (Atlantic)	W Music City
2020	Louisville	4–7	3–7	12th	
2021	Louisville	6–7	4–4	T–4th (Atlantic)	L First Responder
2022	Louisville	7–5	4–4	T–3rd (Atlantic)	Fenway*
Louisville:		25–24	15–18	*resigned prior to bowl game	
Cincinnati Bearcats (Big 12 Conference) (2023–present)
2023	Cincinnati	3–9	1–8	14th	
2024	Cincinnati	5–7	3–6	T–11th	
2025	Cincinnati	7–6	5–4	T–7th	L Liberty
2026	Cincinnati	6–5	3–5		
Cincinnati:		21–27	12–23		
Total:		97–75			
National championship Conference title Conference division title or championship game berth

== Personal life ==
Satterfield is a Christian. He is married to Beth Satterfield. They have one daughter and two sons.
