= 2019 Mississippi State Bulldogs football team =

American college football season

2019 Mississippi State Bulldogs football

Music City Bowl, L 28–38 vs. Louisville
- Conference: Southeastern Conference
- Western Division
- Record: 6–7 (3–5 SEC)
- Head coach: Joe Moorhead (2nd season)
- Offensive scheme: Spread
- Defensive coordinator: Bob Shoop (2nd season)
- Base defense: 4–3
- Captain: Errol Thompson Kody Schexnayder
- Home stadium: Davis Wade Stadium

2019 Southeastern Conference football standings
	Conf.			Overall
Team	W		L	W		L
Eastern Division
No. 4 Georgia x	7	–	1	12	–	2
No. 6 Florida	6	–	2	11	–	2
Tennessee *	5	–	3	8	–	5
Kentucky	3	–	5	8	–	5
Missouri *	3	–	5	6	–	6
South Carolina	3	–	5	4	–	8
Vanderbilt	1	–	7	3	–	9
Western Division
No. 1 LSU x$#^	8	–	0	15	–	0
No. 8 Alabama	6	–	2	11	–	2
No. 14 Auburn	5	–	3	9	–	4
Texas A&M	4	–	4	8	–	5
Mississippi State	3	–	5	6	–	7
Ole Miss	2	–	6	4	–	8
Arkansas	0	–	8	2	–	10
Championship: LSU 37, Georgia 10
# – College Football Playoff champion; ^ – College Football Playoff participant; $ – Conference champion; x – Division champion/co-champions; * – Tennessee vacated all wins due to NCAA violations. Missouri was ineligible for postseason due to NCAA sanctions.; Rankings from AP Poll

The 2019 Mississippi State Bulldogs football team represented Mississippi State University in the 2019 NCAA Division I FBS football season. The Bulldogs played their home games at Davis Wade Stadium in Starkville, Mississippi, and competed in the Western Division of the Southeastern Conference (SEC). They were led by second-year head coach Joe Moorhead. Following the team's loss in the Music City Bowl Moorhead was fired as the Bulldogs' head coach.

== Preseason ==
=== SEC media poll ===
The SEC media poll was released on July 19, 2019 with the Bulldogs predicted to finish in fifth place in the West Division.

== Schedule ==
Mississippi State announced its 2019 football schedule on September 18, 2018. The 2019 schedule consisted of 7 home and 5 away games in the regular season.

Date	Time	Opponent	Site	TV	Result	Attendance
August 31	11:00 a.m.	vs. Louisiana*	Mercedes-Benz Superdome; New Orleans, LA	ESPNU	W 38–28	22,440
September 7	2:30 p.m.	Southern Miss*	Davis Wade Stadium; Starkville, MS	ESPNU	W 38–15	55,143
September 14	11:00 a.m.	Kansas State*	Davis Wade Stadium; Starkville, MS	ESPN	L 24–31	54,522
September 21	3:00 p.m.	Kentucky	Davis Wade Stadium; Starkville, MS	SECN	W 28–13	54,556
September 28	6:00 p.m.	at No. 7 Auburn	Jordan–Hare Stadium; Auburn, AL (SEC Nation)	ESPN	L 23–56	87,451
October 12	11:00 a.m.	at Tennessee	Neyland Stadium; Knoxville, TN	SECN	L 10–20	85,462
October 19	2:30 p.m.	No. 2 LSU	Davis Wade Stadium; Starkville, MS (rivalry / SEC Nation)	CBS	L 13–36	59,282
October 26	11:00 a.m.	at Texas A&M	Kyle Field; College Station, TX	SECN	L 30–49	102,025
November 2	3:00 p.m.	at Arkansas	Donald W. Reynolds Razorback Stadium; Fayetteville, AR	SECN	W 54–24	52,256
November 16	11:00 a.m.	No. 5 Alabama	Davis Wade Stadium; Starkville, MS (rivalry)	ESPN	L 7–38	57,607
November 23	6:30 p.m.	Abilene Christian*^{†}	Davis Wade Stadium; Starkville, MS	SECN Alt.	W 45–7	54,683
November 28	6:30 p.m.	Ole Miss	Davis Wade Stadium; Starkville, MS (Egg Bowl)	ESPN	W 21–20	57,529
December 30	3:00 p.m.	vs. Louisville*	Nissan Stadium; Nashville, TN (Music City Bowl)	ESPN	L 28–38	46,850
*Non-conference game; ^{†}Homecoming; Rankings from AP Poll and CFP Rankings after November 5 released prior to game; All times are in Central time

Schedule source:

== Personnel ==
=== Coaching staff ===
Staff from 2019.

Name	Position
Joe Moorhead	Head coach
Mark Hudspeth	Associate head coach & Tight Ends coach
Terry Richardson	Assistant head coach, Run Game Coordinator, & Running Backs coach
Deke Adams	Defensive line coach
Andrew Breiner	Pass game coordinator & quarterbacks coach
Terrell Buckley	Cornerbacks coach
Luke Getsy	Offensive coordinator* & wide receivers coach
Marcus Johnson	Offensive line coach
Joey Jones	Special teams coordinator
Tem Lukabu	Linebackers coach
Bob Shoop	Defensive coordinator & Safeties coach
Cory Bichey	Head strength and conditioning coach
Andrew Warsaw	Director of football operations
Billy Fessler	Graduate assistant – offense

== Game summaries ==
=== Vs. Louisiana ===
Mississippi State at Louisiana

Team	1	2	3	4	Total
• Bulldogs	7	14	7	10	38
Ragin' Cajuns	7	7	0	14	28

- Date: August 31, 2019
- Location: Mercedes–Benz Superdome
  New Orleans, LA
- Game start: 11:00 a.m. CDT
- Elapsed time: 3 hours and 37 minutes
- Game attendance: 22,440
- Game weather: 86 °F (30 °C) • Weather: N/A (Indoors) • Wind: 6 NE MPH
- Referee: Steve Marlowe
- Television network: ESPNU

Scoring summary
1	12:27	MSST	Osirus Mitchell 31-yard pass from Tommy Stevens (Jordan Lawless kick) (6 plays, 74 yards, 2:33)	MSST 7–0
1	03:17	LA	Elijah Mitchell 3-yard rush (Stevie Artigue kick) (3 plays, 15 yards, 1:05)	TIE 7–7
2	09:18	MSST	Nick Gibson 8-yard rush (Jordan Lawless kick) (5 plays, 42 yards, 1:56)	MSST 14–7
2	04:31	LA	Nick Ralston 11-yard pass from Levi Lewis (Stevie Artigue kick) (10 plays, 69 yards, 4:41)	TIE 14–14
2	00:31	MSST	Tommy Stevens 4-yard rush (Jordan Lawless kick) (11 plays, 82 yards, 3:54)	MSST 21–14
3	07:07	MSST	Kylin Hill 5-yard rush (Jordan Lawless kick) (9 plays, 65 yards, 4:06)	MSST 28–14
4	13:07	MSST	Austin Williams 12-yard pass from Tommy Stevens (Jordan Lawless kick) (1 play, 12 yards, 0:07)	MSST 35–14
4	09:56	LA	Levi Lewis 1-yard rush (Stevie Artigue kick) (9 plays, 69 yards, 3:03)	MSST 35–21
4	02:45	LA	Trey Ragas 17-yard rush (Stevie Artigue kick) (14 plays, 99 yards, 4:36)	MSST 35–28
4	01:02	MSST	Jordan Lawless 37-yard field goal (6 plays, 23 yards, 1:43)	MSST 38–28

Statistics	Mississippi State	Louisiana
First downs	29	27
Total yards	497	430
Rushing yards	261	163
Passing yards	236	267
Turnovers	2	4
Time of possession	30:37	29:23

Team	Category	Player	Statistics
Mississippi State	Passing	Tommy Stevens	20–30, 236 yards, 2 TDs
Mississippi State	Rushing	Kylin Hill	27 carries, 197 yards, 1 TD
Mississippi State	Receiving	Osirus Mitchell	6 receptions, 88 yards, 1 TD
Louisiana	Passing	Levi Lewis	24–39, 267 yards, 1 TD, 1 INT
Louisiana	Rushing	Raymond Calais	8 carries, 80 yards
Louisiana	Receiving	Jamal Bell	8 receptions, 113 yards

=== Southern Miss ===
	1	2	3	4	Total
Golden Eagles	0	0	7	8	15
Bulldogs	7	14	7	10	38

=== Kansas State ===
	1	2	3	4	Total
Wildcats	3	14	0	14	31
Bulldogs	0	14	7	3	24

Mississippi State led in almost every statistical category: more first downs (21–17); more total yards (352–269), more yards rushing (201–146), and more yards passing (151–123). Both teams committed 3 turnovers and 7 penalties and Mississippi State controlled the game clock, holding possession for 33:05 to K-States 26:55.

Solid statistical production wasn't enough, as Kansas State ended up winning the game 31–24.

=== Kentucky ===
	1	2	3	4	Total
Wildcats	3	0	7	3	13
Bulldogs	7	14	0	7	28

=== At Auburn ===
Mississippi State Bulldogs at No. 7 Auburn Tigers – Game summary

Quarter	1	2	3	4	Total
Mississippi State	6	3	7	7	23
No. 7 Auburn	21	21	7	7	56

at Jordan–Hare Stadium • Auburn, Alabama

- Date: September 28, 2019
- Game time: 6:10 p.m.
- Game weather: Temperature: 90° • Wind: NE 5 mph • Weather: Sunny
- Game attendance: 87,451
- Referee: James Carter
- TV announcers (ESPN): Sean McDonough (play-by-play), Todd Blackledge (analyst), Holly Rowe (sideline reporter)

Game information

First Quarter

- AUB – Ja'Tarvious Whitlow 30 yd run (Anders Carlson kick), 12:55 (AUB 7–0)
- AUB – Bo Nix 9 yd run (Anders Carlson kick), 9:46 (AUB 14–0)
- AUB – Anthony Schwartz 13 yd run (Anders Carlson kick), 8:59 (AUB 21–0)
- MSU – Stephen Guidry 9 yd pass from Garrett Shrader (Jace Christmann kick failed), 2:20 (AUB 21–6)

Second Quarter

- AUB – Ja'Tarvious Whitlow 3 yd run (Anders Carlson kick), 13:18 (AUB 28–6)
- MSU – Jace Christmann 27 yd field goal, 7:55 (AUB 28–9)
- AUB – Seth Williams 39 yd pass from Bo Nix (Anders Carlson kick), 5:33 (AUB 35–9)
- AUB – Ja'Tarvious Whitlow 3 yd run (Anders Carlson kick), 0:12 (AUB 42–9)

Third Quarter

- AUB – Seth Williams 32 yd pass from Bo Nix (Anders Carlson kick), 13:28 (AUB 49–9)
- MSU – Osirus Mitchell 21 yd pass from Garrett Shrader (Jace Christmann kick), 2:13 (AUB 49–16)

Fourth Quarter

- AUB – Kam Martin 7 yd run (Anders Carlson kick), 14:16 (AUB 56–16)
- MSU – Garrett Shrader 7 yd run (Jace Christmann kick), 0:50 (AUB 56–23)

Top Passers

- MSU – Garrett Shrader 12–23, 209 yds, 2 TD
- AUB – Bo Nix 16–21, 335 yds, 2 TD

Top Rushers

- MSU – Garrett Shrader 16 rushes, 89 yds, 1 TD
- AUB – Bo Nix 7 rushes, 56 yds, 1 TD

Top Receivers

- MSU – Farrod Green 3 receptions, 69 yds
- AUB – Seth Williams 8 receptions, 161 yds, 2 TD

=== At Tennessee ===
	1	2	3	4	Total
Bulldogs	0	3	0	7	10
Volunteers	7	3	3	7	20

=== LSU ===
No. 2 LSU Tigers at Mississippi State Bulldogs – Game summary

Quarter	1	2	3	4	Total
No. 2 Tigers	3	19	14	0	36
Bulldogs	0	7	0	6	13

at Davis Wade Stadium, Starkville, Mississippi

- Date: October 19
- Game time: 2:30 p.m. CDT
- Game attendance: 59,282
- TV announcers (CBS): Brad Nessler, Gary Danielson and Jamie Erdahl

Game information

First quarter

- LSU – Cade York 20-yard field goal, 7:52. Tigers 3–0. Drive: 12 plays, 42 yards, 4:17.

Second quarter

- LSU – Cade York 23-yard field goal, 12:27. Tigers 6–0. Drive: 10 plays, 84 yards, 3:35.
- LSU – Cade York 25-yard field goal, 8:33. Tigers 9–0. Drive: 6 plays, 37 yards, 3:04.
- MSST – Garrett Shrader 12-yard run (Jace Christmann kick), 5:24. Tigers 9–7. Drive: 7 plays, 75 yards, 3:09.
- LSU – Racey McMath 60-yard pass from Joe Burrow (kick failed), 5:07. Tigers 15–7. Drive: 1 play, 60 yards, 0:17.
- LSU – Ja'Marr Chase 8-yard pass from Joe Burrow (Cade York kick), 0:50. Tigers 22–7. Drive: 5 plays, 55 yards, 1:03.

Third quarter

- LSU – Derrick Dillon 37-yard pass from Joe Burrow (Cade York kick), 10:36. Tigers 29–7. Drive: 4 plays, 66 yards, 1:27.
- LSU – Justin Jefferson 18-yard pass from Joe Burrow (Cade York kick), 5:36. Tigers 36–7. Drive: 7 plays, 80 yards, 2:52.

Fourth quarter

- MSST – Stephen Guidry 24-yard pass from Garrett Shrader (pass failed), 0:59. Tigers 36–13. Drive: 7 plays, 90 yards, 2:42.

Top passers

- LSU – Joe Burrow – 25/32, 327 yards, 4 TD
- MSST – Garrett Shrader – 17/28, 238 yards, TD, 2 INT

Top rushers

- LSU – Clyde Edwards-Helaire – 11 rushes, 53 yards
- MSST – Garrett Shrader – 19 rushes, 66 yards, TD

Top receivers

- LSU – Justin Jefferson – 8 receptions, 89 yards, TD
- MSST – Stephen Guidry – 6 receptions, 98 yards, TD

=== At Texas A&M ===
	1	2	3	4	Total
Bulldogs	0	10	7	13	30
Aggies	14	14	14	7	49

Statistics

Statistics	Mississippi State	Texas A&M
First downs	22	24
Total yards	433	441
Rushing yards	239	207
Passing yards	194	234
Turnovers	3	0
Time of possession	28:12	31:48

Team	Category	Player	Statistics
Mississippi State	Passing	Garrett Shrader	13–30, 194 yards, 3 TD, INT
Mississippi State	Rushing	Kylin Hill	21 carries, 150 yards, TD
Mississippi State	Receiving	Stephen Guidry	2 receptions, 59 yards, TD
Texas A&M	Passing	Kellen Mond	17–23, 234 yards, 3 TD
Texas A&M	Rushing	Isaiah Spiller	22 carries, 90 yards, TD
Texas A&M	Receiving	Jalen Wydermyer	2 receptions, 63 yards, TD

=== At Arkansas ===
Game Nine – Mississippi State Bulldogs (3–5) at Arkansas Razorbacks (2–6)

Quarter	1	2	3	4	Total
Bulldogs	14	24	7	9	54
Razorbacks	0	10	7	7	24

at Donald W. Reynolds Razorback Stadium • Fayetteville, Arkansas

- Date: Saturday, November 2, 2019
- Game time: 3:00 p.m. CDT
- Game weather: Sunny • Temperature: 53 °F (12 °C) • Wind: NNW 9 mph
- Game attendance: 52,256
- Referee: Matt Loeffler
- TV announcers (SEC Network): Taylor Zarzour (play-by-play), Matt Stinchcomb (color), Alyssa Lang (sideline)

Game information

First Quarter

- (12:11) MSST – Kylin Hill 4 yard rush, Jace Christmann kick (Drive: 6 plays, 82 yards, 2:49; Mississippi State 7–0)
- (5:31) MSST – Osirus Mitchell 33 yard pass from Tommy Stevens, Jace Christmann kick (Drive: 11 plays, 80 yards, 5:21; Mississippi State 14–0)

Second Quarter

- (14:04) MSST – Jace Christmann 26 yard field goal (Drive: 11 plays, 68 yards, 4:55; Mississippi State 17–0)
- (10:24) ARK – Rakeem Boyd 52 yard rush, Connor Limpert kick (Drive: 2 plays, 61 yards, 0:57; Mississippi State 17–7)
- (7:55) MSST – Kylin Hill 2 yard rush, Jace Christmann kick (Drive: 6 plays, 75 yards, 2:29; Mississippi State 24–7)
- (5:00) ARK – Connor Limpert 40 yard field goal (Drive: 4 plays, 1 yard, 0:56; Mississippi State 24–10)
- (2:42) MSST – Kylin Hill 1 yard rush, Jace Christmann kick (Drive: 5 plays, 84 yards, 2:18; Mississippi State 31–10)
- (1:59) MSST – Marcus Murphy 32 yard interception return, Jace Christmann kick (Mississippi State 38–10)

Third Quarter

- (10:33) MSST – Farrod Green 3 yard pass from Tommy Stevens, Jace Christmann kick (Drive: 6 plays, 66 yards, 3:09; Mississippi State 45–10)
- (4:03) ARK – Michael Woods II 11 yard pass from John Steven Jones, Connor Limpert kick (Drive: 12 plays, 59 yards, 6:30; Mississippi State 45–17)

Fourth Quarter

- (11:40) MSST – Jace Christmann 46 yard field goal (Drive: 13 plays, 47 yards, 7:23; Mississippi State 48–17)
- (9:47) ARK – KJ Jefferson 5 yard rush, Connor Limpert kick (Drive: 4 plays, 75 yards, 1:53; Mississippi State 48–24)
- (8:22) MSST – Nick Gibson 47 yard rush, 2-pt. rush failed (Drive: 3 plays, 75 yards, 1:25; Mississippi State 54–24)

Statistics	MSST	ARK
First downs	27	10
Total yards	640	285
Rushes–yards	57–460	25–184
Passing yards	180	101
Passing: Comp–Att–Int	13–19–0	9–24–1
Time of possession	40:09	19:51

Team	Category	Player	Statistics
Mississippi State	Passing	Tommy Stevens	12/18, 172 yards, 2 TD
Mississippi State	Rushing	Kylin Hill	21 carries, 234 yards, 3 TD
Mississippi State	Receiving	Deddrick Thomas	2 receptions, 59 yards
Arkansas	Passing	Ben Hicks	4/13, 44 yards, 1 INT
Arkansas	Rushing	Rakeem Boyd	11 carries, 114 yards, 1 TD
Arkansas	Receiving	Treylon Burks	1 reception, 32 yards

=== Alabama ===
Team	1	2	3	4	Total
• No. 5 Alabama	21	14	3	0	38
Mississippi State	7	0	0	0	7

- Date: November 16
- Location: Starkville, MS
- Game start: 11:02 a.m.
- Game attendance: 57,607
- Game weather: 46, clear skies, Wind N @ 6 mph
- Referee: Ken Williamson
- TV announcers (ESPN): Steve Levy (play-by-play), Brian Griese (color), Todd McShay & Molly McGrath (sideline)

Scoring summary
1	13:08	BAMA	Harris 10 rush, Bulovas kick	BAMA 7–0
1	12:54	BAMA	Tagovailoa 19 pass to Harris, Bulovas kick	BAMA 14–0
1	8:37	MSST	Hill 1 rush, Christmann kick	BAMA 14–7
1	3:22	BAMA	Harris 5 rush, Bulovas kick	BAMA 21–7
2	14:15	BAMA	Tagovailoa 35 pass to Waddle, Bulovas kick	BAMA 28–7
2	6:08	BAMA	Harris 5 rush, Bulovas kick	BAMA 35–7
3	7:28	BAMA	Bulovas 22 field goal	BAMA 38–7

Statistics

Statistics	Alabama	Mississippi State
First downs	24	11
Total yards	510	270
Rushing yards	160	188
Passing yards	350	82
Turnovers	0	1
Time of possession	27:57	32:03

Team	Category	Player	Statistics
Alabama	Passing	Tua Tagovailoa	14–18, 256 yards, 2 TDs
Alabama	Rushing	Najee Harris	17 carries, 88 yards, 3 TDs
Alabama	Receiving	Jerry Jeudy	7 receptions, 114 yards
Mississippi State	Passing	Tommy Stevens	12–21, 82 yards, 1 INT
Mississippi State	Rushing	Tommy Stevens	10 carries, 96 yards
Mississippi State	Receiving	Farrod Green	1 reception, 30 yards

=== Abilene Christian ===
	1	2	3	4	Total
Wildcats	0	7	0	0	7
Bulldogs	7	14	7	17	45

=== Ole Miss ===
Ole Miss Rebels (4–7) at Mississippi State Bulldogs (5–6)

Quarter	1	2	3	4	Total
Rebels	0	14	0	6	20
Bulldogs	7	7	7	0	21

at Davis Wade Stadium • Starkville, MS

- Date: Thursday, November 28, 2019
- Game time: 6:30 p.m. CST
- Game weather: • Temperature:
- TV: ESPN

Game information

First Quarter

- (6:42) MSST – Nick Gibson 27 yard rush, Jace Christmann kick
  Mississippi State 7–0; 4 plays, 72 yards, 1:44

Second Quarter

- (11:22) MSST – Garrett Shrader 1 yard rush, Jace Christmann kick
  Mississippi State 14–0; 13 plays, 74 yards, 7:41
- (6:15) MISS – John Rhys Plumlee 2 yard rush, Luke Logan kick
  Mississippi State 14–7; 10 plays, 81 yards, 5:07
- (0:34) MISS – Jerrion Ealy 5 yard rush, Luke Logan kick
  Tied 14–14; 9 plays, 49 yards, 3:00

Third Quarter

- (3:24) MSST – Garrett Shrader 5 yard rush, Jace Christmann kick
  Mississippi State 21–14; 7 plays, 40 yards, 3:30

Fourth Quarter

- (0:04) MISS – Elijah Moore 2 yard pass from Matt Corral, kick failed
  Mississippi State 21–20; 12 plays, 82 yards, 2:02

Statistics	MISS	MSST
First downs	23	15
Total yards	381	318
Rushes/yards	47/136	44/210
Passing yards	245	108
Passing: Comp–Att–Int	15–26–1	10–14–0
Time of possession	28:31	31:29

Team	Category	Player	Statistics
Ole Miss	Passing	Matt Corral	6/12, 124 yards, 1 TD, 1 INT
Ole Miss	Rushing	Jerrion Ealy	15 carries, 82 yards, 1 TD
Ole Miss	Receiving	Braylon Sanders	2 receptions, 88 yards
Mississippi; State	Passing	Garrett Shrader	10/14, 108 yards
Mississippi; State	Rushing	Kylin Hill	27 carries, 132 yards
Mississippi; State	Receiving	Deddrick Thomas	4 receptions, 49 yards

=== vs Louisville (Music City Bowl) ===
2019 Franklin American Mortgage Music City Bowl

Quarter	1	2	3	4	Total
Mississippi State	7	7	0	14	28
Louisville	0	10	14	14	38

at Nissan Stadium • Nashville, Tennessee

- Date: Monday, December 30, 2019
- Game time: 4:00 p.m. EST (3:00 p.m. CST)
- Game weather: Sunny • Temperature: 53 °F (12 °C) • Wind: SW 12 mph
- Game attendance: 46,850
- Referee: Mark Duddy
- TV announcers (ESPN): Tom Hart (play-by-play), Jordan Rodgers (analyst) and Cole Cubelic (sideline)
- ESPN game summary

Game information

First Quarter

- (4:48) MSST – Tommy Stevens 3 yard rush, Jace Christmann kick (Drive: 8 plays, 99 yards, 4:10; Mississippi State 7–0)

Second Quarter

- (10:19) MSST – Nick Gibson 3 yard rush, Jace Christmann kick (Drive: 10 plays, 80 yards, 3:49; Mississippi State 14–0)
- (7:57) UL – Tutu Atwell 33 yard pass to Marshon Ford, Ryan Chalifoux kick (Drive: 5 plays, 72 yards, 2:30; Mississippi State 14–7)
- (0:00) UL – Ryan Chalifoux 31 yard field goal (Drive: 10 plays, 50 yards, 3:14; Mississippi State 14–10)

Third Quarter

- (5:01) UL – Malik Cunningham 24 yard pass to Devante Peete, Ryan Chalifoux kick (Drive: 7 plays, 56 yards, 2:07; Louisville 17–14)
- (2:51) UL – Khane Pass 31 yard fumble return, Ryan Chalifoux kick (Louisville 24–14)

Fourth Quarter

- (13:52) UL – Malik Cunningham 8 yard pass to Marshon Ford, Ryan Chalifoux kick (Drive: 6 plays, 65 yards, 2:30; Louisville 31–14)
- (10:25) MSST – Tommy Stevens 18 yard pass to Stephen Guidry, Jace Christmann kick (Drive: 9 plays, 75 yards, 3:27; Louisville 31–21)
- (2:13) UL – Javian Hawkins 5 yard rush, Ryan Chalifoux kick (Drive: 6 plays, 52 yards, 1:47; Louisville 38–21)
- (0:27) MSST – Tommy Stevens 24 yard pass to Osirus Mitchell, Jace Christmann kick (Drive: 7 plays, 86 yards, 1:46; Louisville 38–28)

=== Statistics ===
Statistics	MSST	UL
First downs	24	23
Plays–yards	62–366	69–510
Rushes–yards	36–145	44–198
Passing yards	221	312
Passing: comp–att–int	17–26–0	17–25–0
Turnovers		
Time of possession	28:26	31:34

Team	Category	Player	Statistics
Mississippi State	Passing	Tommy Stevens	17/26, 221 yards, 2 TD
Mississippi State	Rushing	Tommy Stevens	17 carries, 71 yards, 1 TD
Mississippi State	Receiving	Stephen Guidry	6 receptions, 76 yards, 1 TD
Louisville	Passing	Malik Cunningham	16/23, 279 yards, 2 TD
Louisville	Rushing	Javian Hawkins	23 carries, 105 yards, 1 TD
Louisville	Receiving	Tutu Atwell	9 receptions, 147 yards

== Rankings ==
Ranking movements Legend: ██ Increase in ranking ██ Decrease in ranking — = Not ranked RV = Received votes
	Week																
Poll	Pre	1	2	3	4	5	6	7	8	9	10	11	12	13	14	15	Final
AP	RV	RV	RV	RV	RV	—	—	—	—	—	—	—	—	—	—	—	
Coaches	RV	RV	23	RV	RV	RV	RV	—	—	—	—	—	—	—	—	—	
CFP	Not released										—	—	—	—	—	—	Not released

== Players drafted into the NFL ==
Round	Pick	Player	Position	NFL Club
2	63	Willie Gay	ILB	Kansas City Chiefs
3	89	Cameron Dantzler	CB	Minnesota Vikings
3	106	Tyre Phillips	OT	Baltimore Ravens
7	240	Tommy Stevens	QB	New Orleans Saints
7	249	Brian Cole II	S	Minnesota Vikings
