= Joe Moorhead =

American football player and coach (born 1973)

Current position
- Title: Head coach
- Team: Akron
- Conference: MAC
- Record: 15–44

Biographical details
- Born: November 2, 1973 (age 53); Pittsburgh, Pennsylvania, U.S.
- Education: Central Catholic (Pittsburgh, Pennsylvania)

Playing career
- 1992–1995: Fordham
- 1996–1997: Munich Cowboys
- Position: Quarterback

Coaching career (HC unless noted)
- 1998–1999: Pittsburgh (GA)
- 2000: Georgetown (RB)
- 2001–2002: Georgetown (QB)
- 2003: Georgetown (OC/QB)
- 2004: Akron (WR/RC)
- 2005: Akron (AHC/PGC/WR/RC)
- 2006–2008: Akron (OC/QB)
- 2009–2010: Connecticut (OC/QB)
- 2011: Connecticut (QB)
- 2012–2015: Fordham
- 2016–2017: Penn State (OC/QB)
- 2018–2019: Mississippi State
- 2020–2021: Oregon (OC/QB)
- 2022–present: Akron

Head coaching record
- Overall: 67–69
- Bowls: 0–2
- Tournaments: 2–3 (NCAA D-I playoffs)

Accomplishments and honors

Championships
- 1 Patriot League (2014)

Joe Moorhead (born November 2, 1973) is an American college football coach and former player. He is the head football coach for the University of Akron, a position he has held since 2022. Moorhead served as the head football coach at Fordham University from 2012 to 2015 and Mississippi State University from 2018 to 2019. Prior to entering coaching, Moorhead played as a quarterback at Fordham from 1992 to 1995 and professionally for the Munich Cowboys of the German Football League from 1996 to 1997.

== Coaching career ==
=== Early years ===
After a short professional playing career, the Pittsburgh-born Moorhead began his coaching career as a graduate assistant at the University of Pittsburgh. He was hired as running backs coach at Georgetown University in 2000, eventually being elevated to quarterbacks coach and offensive coordinator by 2003. In 2004, Moorhead began a five-year stint at the University of Akron, including two years as the offensive coordinator. Moorhead joined the University of Connecticut staff in 2009 as offensive coordinator. The Huskies won a Big East Championship in 2010 and made an appearance in the Fiesta Bowl.

=== Fordham ===
Moorhead was named the head football coach at Fordham University on December 16, 2011. He is believed to be the first former Patriot League player to return to the conference as a head coach. Inheriting a 1–10 team, the Rams had the second largest turnaround in FCS in 2012 (6–5). The Rams opened the 2013 season with ten consecutive wins, the best start in Fordham's history.

=== Penn State ===
On December 12, 2015, Moorhead was named the offensive coordinator for the Penn State football team. During James Franklin's first two years as head coach (and prior to Moorhead's arrival), the Penn State offense averaged 335.3 yards per game in 2014 and 348.4 yards per game in 2015. Under Moorhead's offensive system during the 2016 season, offensive output at Penn State improved to 432.6 yards per game.

On August 24, 2017, Moorhead was named the No. 1 rising assistant in college football by Sports Illustrated and Yahoo.

=== Mississippi State ===
On November 28, 2017, Moorhead was hired as the head coach at Mississippi State University, replacing Dan Mullen who had been with Mississippi State for nine seasons before being hired by the University of Florida.

Moorhead led the Bulldogs to an 8–4 record in 2018, tied for the most wins for a first-year coach in school history. However, his second season got off to a rough start when it emerged that 10 players allowed a tutor to take tests and complete coursework for them. The players were all suspended for eight games, severely limiting the Bulldogs' depth. Fans were also angered by a pedestrian offense and upsets by Kansas State and Tennessee. There was also concern that he did not really fit in with Mississippi State's culture, even though he'd taken the podium ringing a cowbell when he was formally introduced as head coach.

According to ESPN, Mississippi State officials intended to fire Moorhead if he did not defeat Ole Miss in the 2019 Egg Bowl. However, the Bulldogs won that game 21–20 to become bowl-eligible, making Moorhead only the third Bulldog coach to win his first two Egg Bowls. At an emotional press conference the following day, Moorhead tried to knock down the rumors about his job security, saying, "This is my school, this is my team, this is my program," and that anyone who thought otherwise could "pound sand and kick rocks." He added, "You'll have to drag my Yankee ass out of here."

However, on January 3, 2020, Moorhead was fired after finishing 6–7 following a 38–28 loss to Louisville in the Music City Bowl. Besides the Bulldogs' lackluster performance in that game, athletic director John Cohen and other school officials were angered when they learned quarterback Garrett Shrader had suffered an eye injury during a fight in practice. Shrader had missed the game with what Moorhead initially described as an "upper body injury."

=== Oregon ===
After his firing from Mississippi State, Moorhead was named the offensive coordinator and quarterbacks coach at the University of Oregon on January 21, 2020.

=== Akron ===
Moorhead returned to Akron as its head coach following the 2021 season, replacing Tom Arth.

== Personal life ==
Moorhead graduated from Fordham University in 1996 with a B.A. in English. Moorhead and his wife, Jennifer have three children, Kyra, Mason, and Donovan.

== Head coaching record ==
Year	Team	Overall	Conference	Standing	Bowl/playoffs	Coaches^{#}	TSN/STATS^{°}
Fordham Rams (Patriot League) (2012–2015)
2012	Fordham	6–5	0–0				
2013	Fordham	12–2	0–0		L NCAA Division I Second Round	10	9
2014	Fordham	11–3	6–0	1st	L NCAA Division I Second Round	14	11
2015	Fordham	9–3	5–1	2nd	L NCAA Division I First Round	19	19
Fordham:		38–13	11–1				
Mississippi State Bulldogs (Southeastern Conference) (2018–2019)
2018	Mississippi State	8–5	4–4	4th (Western)	L Outback	25	
2019	Mississippi State	6–7	3–5	5th (Western)	L Music City		
Mississippi State:		14–12	7–9				
Akron Zips (Mid-American Conference) (2022–present)
2022	Akron	2–10	1–7	6th (East)			
2023	Akron	2–10	1–7	5th (East)			
2024	Akron	4–8	3–5	8th			
2025	Akron	5–7	4–4	T–6th			
2026	Akron	2–9	1–6				
Akron:		15–44	10–29				
Total:		67–69					
National championship Conference title Conference division title or championship game berth
