= Malik Cunningham =

American football player (born 1998)

DC Defenders
- Position: Wide receiver
- Roster status: Unsigned draft pick

Personal information
- Born: October 6, 1998 (age 28); Montgomery, Alabama, U.S.
- Listed height: 6 ft 0 in (1.83 m)
- Listed weight: 198 lb (90 kg)

Career information
- High school: Park Crossing (Montgomery)
- College: Louisville (2017–2022)
- NFL draft: 2023: undrafted

Career history
- New England Patriots (2023); Baltimore Ravens (2023–2024); Detroit Lions (2025); DC Defenders (2027–present)

Awards and highlights
- Music City Bowl MVP (2019)

Career NFL statistics as of 2025
- Rushing yards: 1
- Rushing average: 1.0
- Stats at Pro Football Reference

Micale Malik Cunningham (born October 6, 1998) is an American professional football wide receiver for the DC Defenders of the United Football League (UFL). He played college football for the Louisville Cardinals as a quarterback. He has also played in the NFL for the New England Patriots, and was selected by the Defenders in the 2nd round of the 2027 UFL Draft.

== Early life ==
Cunningham attended Park Crossing High School in Montgomery, Alabama. During his career, he passed for 6,276 yards and 71 touchdowns, while rushing for 1,926 yards and 32 scores. He committed to the University of Louisville to play college football.

== College career ==
After redshirting his first year at Louisville in 2017, Cunningham appeared in 10 games and made three starts in 2018. He completed 40 of 67 passes for 473 yards with one touchdown and one interception and rushed for a team-high 497 yards and five touchdowns. In 2019, he completed 111 of 178 passes for 2,065 yards, 22 touchdowns and five interceptions. He also added 482 yards and six touchdowns rushing. On November 18, 2021, Cunningham put up 527 yards of offense (224 yards rushing and 303 yards passing) in a blowout victory against Duke; he had five passing touchdowns and two rushing touchdowns.

Cunningham was named the MVP of the 2019 Music City Bowl after passing for 279 yards with two touchdowns and rushing for 81 yards. Cunningham also played in the 2021 First Responder Bowl and the 2023 Senior Bowl.

=== Statistics ===
Season	Games			Passing								Rushing			
Season	GP	GS	Record	Cmp	Att	Pct	Yds	Avg	TD	Int	Rtg	Att	Yds	Avg	TD
2017	0	0	—	Redshirt (redshirt)											
2018	10	3	1−2	40	67	59.7	473	7.1	1	1	120.9	79	497	6.3	5
2019	12	10	7−3	112	179	62.6	2,065	11.5	22	5	194.4	123	482	3.9	6
2020	11	11	4−7	195	304	64.1	2,617	8.6	20	12	150.3	131	609	4.6	7
2021	13	13	6−7	209	337	62.0	2,941	8.7	19	6	150.4	173	1,034	6.0	20
2022	10	10	5−5	136	218	62.4	1,568	7.2	8	5	130.3	113	560	5.0	12
Career	56	47	23−24	692	1,105	62.6	9,664	8.7	70	29	151.7	619	3,182	5.1	50

== Professional career ==
Pre-draft measurables
Height	Weight	Arm length	Hand span	Wingspan	40-yard dash	10-yard split	20-yard split
5 ft 11 3/4 in (1.82 m)	192 lb (87 kg)	31 3/8 in (0.80 m)	9 1/2 in (0.24 m)	6 ft 3 3/8 in (1.91 m)	4.53 s	1.51 s	2.60 s
All values from NFL Combine

Cunningham was selected in the third round of the 2023 USFL draft by the Birmingham Stallions, although he opted not to play for them during the 2023 USFL season, and instead committed to the NFL Draft.

=== New England Patriots ===
Following the conclusion of the 2023 NFL draft, the New England Patriots signed Cunningham as an undrafted free agent. He was waived on August 29, and re-signed to the practice squad. On October 14, 2023, the Patriots promoted Cunningham to the active roster on a three-year contract. He was then released on October 24 and signed back to the practice squad the following day.

=== Baltimore Ravens ===
The Baltimore Ravens signed Cunningham off the Patriots' practice squad on December 12, 2023. The signing reunited him with his former Louisville teammate Lamar Jackson. During the team's 2024 organized team activities, he transitioned from quarterback to wide receiver. He was released during cuts on August 27, 2024, and signed onto the practice squad the next day.

Cunningham signed a reserve/future contract with the Ravens on January 21, 2025. He was waived by the Ravens at the end of pre-season.

=== Detroit Lions ===
On September 16, 2025, Cunninghman was signed to the practice squad of the Detroit Lions. He signed a reserve/future contract with Detroit on January 5, 2026.

On August 30, 2026, Cunningham was waived by the Lions as a part of final roster cuts.

== NFL career statistics ==
Year	Team	Games			Passing									Rushing					Sacked		Fumbles	
Year	Team	GP	GS	Record	Cmp	Att	Pct	Yds	Y/A	Lng	TD	Int	Rtg	Att	Yds	Y/A	Lng	TD	Sck	Yds	Fum	Lost
2023	NE	1	0	—	0	0	0.0	0	0.0	0	0	0	0.0	0	0	0.0	0	0	1	5	0	0
2023	BAL	1	0	—	0	0	0.0	0	0.0	0	0	0	0.0	0	0	0.0	0	0	0	0	0	0
2025	DET	1	0	—	0	0	0.0	0	0.0	0	0	0	0.0	1	1	1.0	1	0	0	0	0	0
Career		3	0	—	0	0	0.0	0	0.0	0	0	0	0.0	1	1	1.0	1	0	1	5	0	0

== Personal life ==
Cunningham originally went by his middle name, Malik, before changing to his true first name, Micale, midway through the 2019 season. He again went by Malik in 2020.
