= 2019 Louisville Cardinals football team =

American college football season

2019 Louisville Cardinals football

Music City Bowl champion

Music City Bowl, W 38–28 vs. Mississippi State
- Conference: Atlantic Coast Conference
- Atlantic Division
- Record: 8–5 (5–3 ACC)
- Head coach: Scott Satterfield (1st season)
- Offensive coordinator: Dwayne Ledford (1st season)
- Offensive scheme: Spread option
- Defensive coordinator: Bryan Brown (1st season)
- Base defense: 4–2–5
- Home stadium: Cardinal Stadium

Uniform
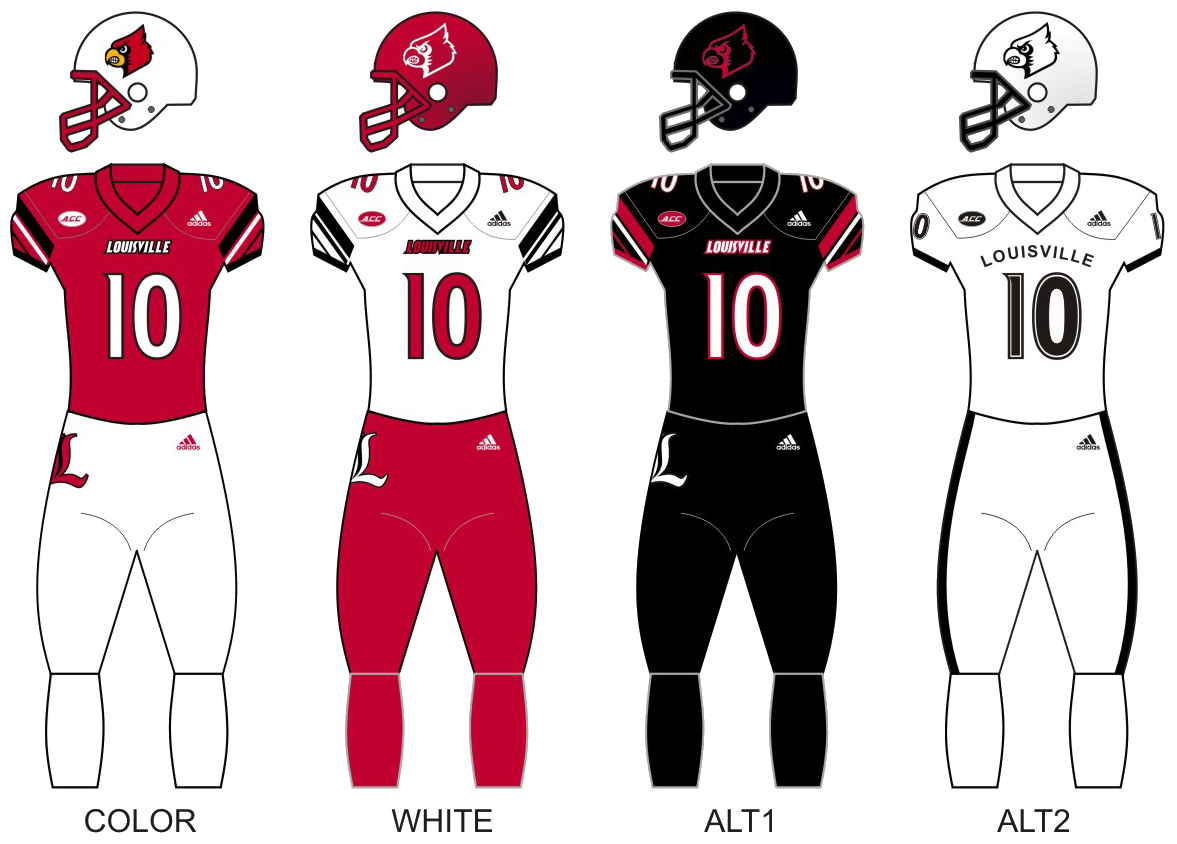

2019 Atlantic Coast Conference football standings
	Conf.			Overall
Team	W		L	W		L
Atlantic Division
No. 2 Clemson xy$^	8	–	0	14	–	1
Louisville	5	–	3	8	–	5
Wake Forest	4	–	4	8	–	5
Boston College	4	–	4	6	–	7
Florida State	4	–	4	6	–	7
Syracuse	2	–	6	5	–	7
NC State	1	–	7	4	–	8
Coastal Division
Virginia x	6	–	2	9	–	5
Virginia Tech	5	–	3	8	–	5
Pittsburgh	4	–	4	8	–	5
North Carolina	4	–	4	7	–	6
Miami (FL)	4	–	4	6	–	7
Duke	3	–	5	5	–	7
Georgia Tech	2	–	6	3	–	9
Championship: Clemson 62, Virginia 17
^ – College Football Playoff participant; $ – Conference champion; x – Division champion/co-champions; Rankings from AP Poll

The 2019 Louisville Cardinals football team represented the University of Louisville during the 2019 NCAA Division I FBS football season. This was the team's the first season under head coach Scott Satterfield. The Cardinals played their home games at Cardinal Stadium, formerly known as Papa John's Cardinal Stadium, in Louisville, Kentucky.

== Preseason ==
=== Preseason media poll ===
In the preseason ACC media poll, Louisville was predicted to finish last in the Atlantic Division.

== Schedule ==
Date	Time	Opponent	Site	TV	Result	Attendance
September 2	8:00 p.m.	No. 9 Notre Dame*	Cardinal Stadium; Louisville, KY	ESPN	L 17–35	58,187
September 7	7:00 p.m.	Eastern Kentucky*	Cardinal Stadium; Louisville, KY	ACCN Extra	W 42–0	48,808
September 14	4:00 p.m.	vs. Western Kentucky*	Nissan Stadium; Nashville, TN	Stadium	W 38–21	22,665
September 21	3:30 p.m.	at Florida State	Doak Campbell Stadium; Tallahassee, FL	ESPN	L 24–35	46,530
October 5	12:30 p.m.	Boston College	Cardinal Stadium; Louisville, KY	ACCRSN	W 41–39	46,007
October 12	7:30 p.m.	at No. 19 Wake Forest	BB&T Field; Winston-Salem, NC	ACCN	W 62–59	24,434
October 19	12:00 p.m.	No. 3 Clemson	Cardinal Stadium; Louisville, KY	ABC	L 10–45	51,015
October 26	3:30 p.m.	Virginia^{†}	Cardinal Stadium; Louisville, KY	ACCN	W 28–21	48,689
November 9	3:30 p.m.	at Miami (FL)	Hard Rock Stadium; Miami, FL (rivalry)	ESPN2	L 27–52	53,111
November 16	7:30 p.m.	at NC State	Carter–Finley Stadium; Raleigh, NC	ACCN	W 34–20	54,089
November 23	4:00 p.m.	Syracuse	Cardinal Stadium; Louisville, KY	ACCN	W 56–34	46,769
November 30	12:00 p.m.	at Kentucky*	Kroger Field; Lexington, KY (Governor's Cup)	SECN	L 13–45	48,336
December 30	4:00 p.m.	vs. Mississippi State*	Nissan Stadium; Nashville, TN (Music City Bowl)	ESPN	W 38–28	46,850
*Non-conference game; ^{†}Homecoming; Rankings from AP Poll and CFP Rankings after November 5 released prior to game; All times are in Eastern time

== Game summaries ==
=== Notre Dame ===
	1	2	3	4	Total
No. 9 Fighting Irish	14	7	7	7	35
Cardinals	14	0	0	3	17

=== Eastern Kentucky ===
	1	2	3	4	Total
Colonels	0	0	0	0	0
Cardinals	14	0	14	14	42

=== Vs. Western Kentucky ===
	1	2	3	4	Total
Hilltoppers	0	7	7	7	21
Cardinals	7	24	7	0	38

=== At Florida State ===
	1	2	3	4	Total
Cardinals	0	7	10	7	24
Seminoles	21	0	0	14	35

=== Boston College ===
	1	2	3	4	Total
Eagles	7	15	7	10	39
Cardinals	14	14	3	10	41

=== At Wake Forest ===
	1	2	3	4	Total
Cardinals	21	10	14	17	62
No. 19 Demon Deacons	7	14	10	28	59

=== Clemson ===
	1	2	3	4	Total
No. 3 Tigers	3	14	7	21	45
Cardinals	0	3	0	7	10

=== Virginia ===
	1	2	3	4	Total
Cavaliers	7	7	0	7	21
Cardinals	7	0	7	14	28

=== At Miami (FL) ===
	1	2	3	4	Total
Cardinals	7	7	7	6	27
Hurricanes	21	14	17	0	52

=== At NC State ===
	1	2	3	4	Total
Cardinals	0	7	20	7	34
Wolfpack	0	10	0	10	20

=== Syracuse ===
	1	2	3	4	Total
Orange	3	7	17	7	34
Cardinals	21	7	21	7	56

=== At Kentucky ===
	1	2	3	4	Total
Cardinals	6	7	0	0	13
Wildcats	7	10	14	14	45

=== vs Mississippi State (Music City Bowl) ===
	1	2	3	4	Total
Bulldogs	7	7	0	14	28
Cardinals	0	10	14	14	38
