= Jhamon Ausbon =

American football player (born 1999)

Profile
- Position: Wide receiver

Personal information
- Born: September 3, 1999 (age 27); Houston, Texas, U.S.
- Listed height: 6 ft 2 in (1.88 m)
- Listed weight: 210 lb (95 kg)

Career information
- High school: IMG Academy
- College: Texas A&M
- NFL draft: 2021: undrafted

Career history
- Philadelphia Eagles (2021)*
- * Offseason or practice squad member only
- Stats at Pro Football Reference

Jhamon Ausbon is a former American football wide receiver. He played college football at Texas A&M.

== Early life and education ==
Ausbon was born in Houston, Texas. He went to high school at IMG Academy in Florida, being named Under-Armour All-American after helping his team achieve an undefeated record. He was rated a top-20 wide receiver nationally after his senior season.

Ausbon played college football at Texas A&M. He played as a true freshman, hauling in 50 passes for 571 yards and 3 touchdowns. Against New Mexico and Wake Forest he recorded 100–yard games, with 7 catches for 105 yards against New Mexico as well as 112 yards on 12 receptions against Wake Forest. He was named to the All–SEC freshmen team following the season. He started nine out of three games his sophomore season, missing four due to injury. He recorded 31 receptions for 375 yards in season, earning the Offensive Attitude Award, Offensive Skill Blocker Award and the Strength and Conditioning Offensive Aggie Award at the team's annual banquet.

In his junior season, Ausbon started all 13 games, and amassed 66 catches for 872 yards, leading the team. He also scored five touchdowns as team captain. Against Lamar and Auburn he recorded 100–yard games, also scoring once against Lamar. He was awarded the team's Offensive Leadership and Offensive Strength Awards at the annual team banquet. He opted out in the 2020 season due to the COVID-19 pandemic. He declared for the NFL draft in 2021.

== Professional career ==
After going unselected in the 2021 NFL draft, Ausbon signed as an undrafted free agent with the Philadelphia Eagles. He was waived by the Eagles on August 22, 2021.
