= Tommy Stevens =

American gridiron football player (born 1996)

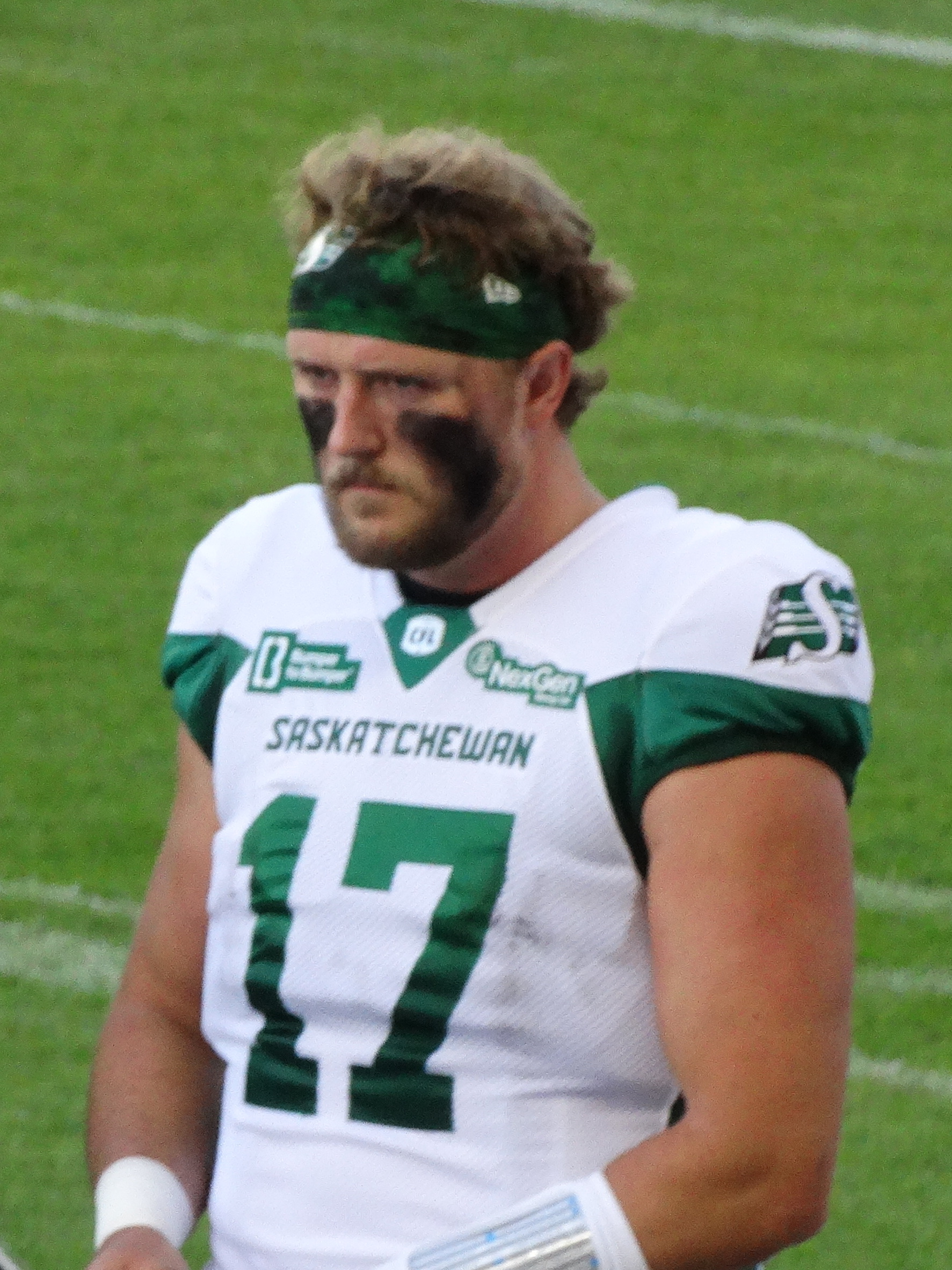
- Stevens with the Saskatchewan Roughriders in 2025

No. 17 – Saskatchewan Roughriders
- Position: Quarterback
- Roster status: Active
- CFL status: American

Personal information
- Born: December 15, 1996 (age 29); Indianapolis, Indiana, U.S.
- Listed height: 6 ft 4 in (1.93 m)
- Listed weight: 245 lb (111 kg)

Career information
- High school: Decatur Central (Indianapolis)
- College: Penn State (2015–2018); Mississippi State (2019)
- NFL draft: 2020: 7th round, 240th overall pick

Career history
- New Orleans Saints (2020)*; Carolina Panthers (2020); New York Giants (2021)*; Calgary Stampeders (2022–2024); Saskatchewan Roughriders (2025–present)
- * Offseason or practice squad member only

Awards and highlights
- Grey Cup champion (2025); CFL rushing touchdowns leader (2024); CFL record: Most rushing touchdowns in a single game by a quarterback: 4 (2022)

Career NFL statistics
- Games played: 1
- Rushing yards: 24
- Rushing average: 6
- Stats at Pro Football Reference

Career CFL statistics as of 2025
- Games played: 68
- Passing yards: 83
- TD–INT: 1–0
- Rushing yards: 868
- Rushing touchdowns: 30
- Stats at CFL.ca

Thomas Mason Stevens (born December 15, 1996) is an American professional football quarterback for the Saskatchewan Roughriders of the Canadian Football League (CFL). He played college football at Mississippi State and was drafted by the New Orleans Saints in the seventh round of the 2020 NFL draft as a quarterback. Stevens initially played football at Penn State before transferring to Mississippi State. Stevens has also been a member of the Carolina Panthers, New York Giants, and Calgary Stampeders.

== Early life ==
Thomas Mason Stevens was born on December 15, 1996, in Indianapolis, Indiana. He attended Decatur Central High School in Indianapolis.

== College career ==
Stevens began his college career at Penn State. He had nine touchdowns as a redshirt sophomore in 2017 playing backup to Trace McSorley. He missed several games in 2018. During his career at Penn State, Stevens connected on 24 of 41 passes for 304 yards and four touchdowns, rushed for 506 yards and eight touchdowns and caught 14 passes for 62 yards and two touchdowns. Stevens entered the transfer portal in April 2019 and decided to transfer to Mississippi State. In 2019, he struggled with injuries again but played in nine games, compiling 1,155 passing yards, 381 rushing yards, 15 total touchdowns and five interceptions.

== Professional career ==
Pre-draft measurables
Height	Weight	Arm length	Hand span	Wingspan
6 ft 4 1/2 in (1.94 m)	237 lb (108 kg)	32 in (0.81 m)	9 1/2 in (0.24 m)	6 ft 4 1/4 in (1.94 m)
All values from Pro Day

=== New Orleans Saints ===
Stevens was drafted by the New Orleans Saints in the seventh round, with the 240th overall pick in the 2020 NFL draft. In training camp, Stevens was moved from quarterback to tight end. He was waived on September 5, 2020, and re-signed to the practice squad the next day. Stevens was released by New Orleans on November 10.

=== Carolina Panthers ===
On November 16, 2020, Stevens was signed to the practice squad of the Carolina Panthers; he was listed as a quarterback. On January 2, 2021, Stevens was promoted to the active roster. He played in one regular-season game with the Panthers, gaining 24 yards on four rushing attempts. Stevens was waived by the team on June 1.

=== New York Giants ===
On August 4, 2021, Stevens signed with the New York Giants. He was waived by the Giants on August 10.

=== Calgary Stampeders ===
On January 4, 2022, Stevens signed a contract with the Calgary Stampeders of the Canadian Football League (CFL). He was the third-string quarterback behind Bo Levi Mitchell and Jake Maier, primarily serving as the team's short yardage quarterback. During the Stampeders' final game of the season, Stevens received extended playing time, completing four of five passes for 32 yards and one touchdown while also running for 163 yards on four carries, including a 85-yard touchdown run and a 71-yard run.

In the 2024 season, as a short-yardage specialist, Stevens scored 10 rushing touchdowns, the third-highest season total in Calgary history for a quarterback (behind Doug Flutie and Henry Burris, who share the record of 11). He became a free agent upon the expiry of his contract on February 11, 2025.

=== Saskatchewan Roughriders ===
On February 11, 2025, Stevens signed with the Saskatchewan Roughriders. He played in 14 regular season games where he operated as the short yardage quarterback, recording 50 carries for 183 yards and five touchdowns. He played in both post-season games, including the 112th Grey Cup where he had four carries for ten yards and two touchdowns in the Roughriders' victory over the Montreal Alouettes. On December 5, 2025, he signed a two-year extension with the team.

== Career statistics ==
=== NFL ===
Year	Team	Games		Rushing				
Year	Team	GP	GS	Att	Yds	Avg	Lng	TD
2020	CAR	1	0	4	24	6.0	10	0
Career		1	0	4	24	6.0	10	0

=== CFL ===
Year	Team	Games			Passing								Rushing			
Year	Team	GP	GS	Record	Cmp	Att	Pct	Yds	Y/A	TD	Int	Rtg	Att	Yds	Avg	TD
2022	CGY	18	0	—	6	9	66.7	41	4.6	1	0	113.7	56	297	5.3	9
2023	CGY	18	0	—	4	9	44.4	17	1.9	0	0	51.6	44	151	3.4	6
2024	CGY	18	0	—	1	2	50.0	24	12.0	0	0	118.8	60	237	4.0	10
2025	SSK	14	0	—	1	1	100.0	1	1.0	0	0	79.2	50	183	3.7	5
2026	SSK	18	0	—									97	300	3.1	17
Career		86	0	0–0	12	21	57.1	83	4.0	1	0	82.0	307	1,168	3.8	47

=== College ===
Year	Team	Games			Passing								Rushing			
Year	Team	GP	GS	Record	Cmp	Att	Pct	Yds	Y/A	TD	Int	Rtg	Att	Yds	Avg	TD
2015	Penn State	0	0	—	Redshirted (redshirt)											
2016	Penn State	7	0	—	2	3	66.7	36	12.0	0	0	167.5	21	198	9.4	2
2017	Penn State	9	0	—	14	27	51.9	158	5.9	3	0	137.7	27	190	7.0	4
2018	Penn State	7	0	—	8	11	72.7	110	9.1	1	1	168.5	28	118	4.2	2
2019	Mississippi State	9	9	4–5	97	161	60.2	1,155	7.2	11	5	136.8	83	381	4.6	4
Career		32	9	4–5	121	202	59.9	1,459	7.2	15	6	139.1	159	887	5.6	12
