= Farrod Green =

American football player (born 1997)

No. 41
- Position: Tight end

Personal information
- Born: June 10, 1997 (age 29); Wesson, Mississippi, U.S.
- Listed height: 6 ft 3 in (1.91 m)
- Listed weight: 245 lb (111 kg)

Career information
- College: Mississippi State
- NFL draft: 2020: undrafted

Career history
- Indianapolis Colts (2020–2021)

Career NFL statistics
- Games played: 1
- Stats at Pro Football Reference

Farrod Green (born June 10, 1997) is an American former professional football player who was a tight end for the Indianapolis Colts of the National Football League (NFL). He was signed by the Colts as an undrafted free agent in 2020 following his college football career with the Mississippi State Bulldogs.

== Professional career ==
Green signed with the Indianapolis Colts as an undrafted free agent following the 2020 NFL draft on April 29, 2020. He was waived during final roster cuts on September 5, 2020, and signed to the practice squad the next day. He was elevated to the active roster on September 19 for the team's week 2 game against the Minnesota Vikings, and reverted to the practice squad after the game. On January 10, 2021, Green signed a reserve/futures contract with the Colts.

On August 31, 2021, Green was waived by the Colts and re-signed to the practice squad the next day. He signed a reserve/future contract on January 10, 2022. He was waived on May 10, 2022.
