= Stephen Guidry (American football) =

American football player (born 1997)

Profile
- Position: Wide receiver

Personal information
- Born: March 25, 1997 (age 29); New Roads, Louisiana, U.S.
- Listed height: 6 ft 4 in (1.93 m)
- Listed weight: 200 lb (91 kg)

Career information
- High school: Livonia High School
- College: Hinds (2016–2017); Mississippi State (2018–2019)
- NFL draft: 2020: undrafted

Career history
- Dallas Cowboys (2020); Orlando Guardians (2023)

Awards and highlights
- 2017 MACJC Second Team All-State
- Stats at Pro Football Reference

Stephen Gerard Guidry Jr. (born March 25, 1997) is an American football wide receiver. He played college football for the Mississippi State Bulldogs.

== Early life ==
Guidry attended Pointe Coupee Central High School. As a junior, he tallied 37 receptions for 1,064 yards and 17 touchdowns. He also lettered in basketball and track for three years.

As a senior, he transferred to Livonia High School. He posted 36 receptions for 854 yards and 13 touchdowns. He was named the Most Valuable Player of the 13th Annual Red Stick Bowl, after collecting 130 receiving yards and four touchdown receptions. He contributed to the school winning its first state championship, by making a 4-yard touchdown catch in a 43-14 victory over Amite High Magnet School, to capture the 2014 LHSAA Class 3A Championship. He received LFCA Class 3A All-State, LSWA Class 3A All-State and first-team NOLA.com/The Times-Picayune All-Baton Rouge Area Team honors.

== College career ==
Guidry enrolled at Hinds Community College. As a freshman, he had 30 catches for 547 yards and 5 touchdowns.

As a sophomore, he made 22 receptions for 326 yards and 4 touchdowns, while receiving second-team MACJC All-State honors. He was ranked as the No. 1 junior college wide receiver, the fourth-best overall prospect among all 2018 JUCO recruits and a consensus four-star prospect.

=== 2018 season ===
In his junior season, he transferred to Mississippi State University. He played in all 13 games with five starts and was part of a run-first offense, where his blocking skills were needed. He led the team in receiving yards (440), yards per reception (23.16), receptions for a first down (15), receptions of 10+ yards (16) and receptions of 20+ yards (9), finishing the seasons with 19 receptions for three touchdowns.

Guidry distinguished himself by being one of six players in the SEC with at least one reception of 80+ yards. He made a catch in 12 of his 13 games and recorded a reception of 20+ yards in seven of them. Guidry ranked second on the team in receiving yards against conference opponents (240), and had one 100-yard receiving game (130 vs. No. 16 Texas A&M).

=== 2019 season ===
In his senior season, Guidry played in 12 games, starting nine of them. He Finished third on the team in receiving yards (387) and receptions for 20-plus yards (4), second in receiving touchdowns (5) and receptions for 10-plus yards (19), and tied for first in catches (30) and receptions for a first down (21). He also caught one touchdown in five of his 12 games.

Guidry played in 25 career games with 14 starts, finishing with 49 receptions for 827 yards and eight touchdowns for the Bulldogs. He graduated from MSU in December 2019 with a degree in interdisciplinary studies.

=== Statistics ===
Year	Team	Games	Receiving			
Year	Team	Games	Rec	Yards	Avg	TD
2018	Mississippi State	13	19	440	23.16	3
2019	Mississippi State	12	30	387	12.9	5
Career		25	49	827	16.88	8

== Professional career ==
Pre-draft measurables
Height	Weight	Arm length	Hand span	Wingspan	40-yard dash	10-yard split	20-yard split	20-yard shuttle	Three-cone drill	Vertical jump	Broad jump
6 ft 3 in (1.91 m)	201 lb (91 kg)	32 3/4 in (0.83 m)	9 1/8 in (0.23 m)	6 ft 6 7/8 in (2.00 m)	4.47 s	1.56 s	2.65 s	4.46 s	7.31 s	34 in (0.86 m)	10 ft 5 in (3.18 m)
All values from NFL Combine

=== Dallas Cowboys ===
Guidry was signed as an undrafted free agent by the Dallas Cowboys after the 2020 NFL draft. In response to the COVID-19 pandemic, Guidry was one of 66 NFL players and one of 3 Cowboys players along with Maurice Canady and Jamize Olawale, to opt out of the 2020 NFL season. He did not receive the $150,000 stipend that the NFL gave to veteran players with no health risk, but was able to keep his $10,000 signing bonus. The Cowboys retained his player rights.

In 2021, he returned to the team, but missed parts of the organized team activities and rookie minicamp with an injury. On June 11, he was waived/injured before the start of training camp and was placed on the injured reserve list on June 15. On July 19, 2021, Guidry was waived from injured reserve.

=== Orlando Guardians ===
Guidry was selected by the Orlando Guardians in the third round (20th overall) of the 2023 XFL draft. He signed a contract with the team on July 19, 2023. He appeared in one game, making 2 receptions for 2 yards. The Guardians folded when the XFL and USFL merged to create the United Football League (UFL).
