= Louisville Cardinals football statistical leaders =

The Louisville Cardinals football statistical leaders are individual statistical leaders of the Louisville Cardinals football program in various categories, including passing, rushing, receiving, total offense, defensive stats, and kicking. Within those areas, the lists identify single-game, single-season, and career leaders. The Cardinals represent the University of Louisville in the NCAA Division I Atlantic Coast Conference.

Louisville began competing in intercollegiate football in 1912. However, these lists are dominated by more recent players for several reasons:

- Since the 1940s, seasons have increased from 10 games to 11 and then 12 games in length.
- The NCAA didn't allow freshmen to play varsity football until 1972 (with the exception of the World War II years), allowing players to have four-year careers.
- Bowl games only began counting toward single-season and career statistics in 2002. The Cardinals have played in 14 bowl games since then, with a 15th assured in 2021, giving many recent players an extra game to accumulate statistics.
- Due to COVID-19, the NCAA ruled that the 2020 season would not count against any player's athletic eligibility, giving everyone who played in that season the opportunity for five years of eligibility instead of the standard four.
- From 2018 through 2025, players were allowed to participate in as many as four games in a redshirt season; previously, playing in even one game "burned" the redshirt. In 2024 and 2025, postseason games did not count against the four-game limit. These changes to redshirt rules have given very recent players several extra games to accumulate statistics.
- A more recent change likely to significantly affect future career leaderboards was introduced in 2026 with full implementation starting with the 2027 freshman class. Going forward, redshirting will be prohibited, but players will have five years of full athletic eligibility, provided that they are no older than 19 when they first enroll in a postsecondary institution. Players who had remaining eligibility under previous rules at the end of the 2025 season will benefit from the new rule.

These lists are updated through Week 6 of the 2026 regular season. Active players are listed in bold.

== Passing ==
=== Passing yards ===
Career
Rk	Player	Yards	Years
1	Chris Redman	12,541	1996 1997 1998 1999
2	Brian Brohm	10,775	2004 2005 2006 2007
3	Teddy Bridgewater	9,817	2011 2012 2013
4	Malik Cunningham	9,664	2018 2019 2020 2021 2022
5	Lamar Jackson	9,043	2015 2016 2017
6	Dave Ragone	8,564	1999 2000 2001 2002
7	Jay Gruden	7,024	1985 1986 1987 1988
8	Stefan LeFors	5,853	2001 2002 2003 2004
9	Ed Rubbert	5,496	1983 1984 1985 1986
10	Jeff Brohm	5,451	1989 1990 1991 1992 1993

Single season
Rk	Player	Yards	Year
1	Chris Redman	4,042	1998
2	Brian Brohm	4,024	2007
3	Teddy Bridgewater	3,970	2013
4	Teddy Bridgewater	3,718	2012
5	Lamar Jackson	3,660	2017
6	Chris Redman	3,647	1999
7	Lamar Jackson	3,543	2016
8	Jack Plummer	3,204	2023
9	Tyler Shough	3,195	2024
10	Stefan LeFors	3,145	2003

Single game
Rk	Player	Yards	Year	Opponent
1	Chris Redman	592	1998	East Carolina
2	Brian Brohm	555	2007	Syracuse
3	Chris Redman	506	1998	Memphis
4	Chris Redman	477	1998	Tulane
5	Chris Redman	474	1998	Western Kentucky
6	Brian Brohm	467	2007	Utah
7	Stefan LeFors	459	2003	TCU
8	Chris Redman	450	1999	Illinois
9	Teddy Bridgewater	447	2013	Miami (Russell Athletic Bowl)
10	Chris Redman	431	1998	Cincinnati

=== Passing touchdowns ===
Career
Rk	Player	TDs	Years
1	Chris Redman	84	1996 1997 1998 1999
2	Dave Ragone	74	1999 2000 2001 2002
3	Teddy Bridgewater	72	2011 2012 2013
4	Brian Brohm	71	2004 2005 2006 2007
5	Malik Cunningham	70	2018 2019 2020 2021 2022
6	Lamar Jackson	69	2015 2016 2017
7	Jay Gruden	44	1985 1986 1987 1988
8	Jeff Brohm	38	1989 1990 1991 1992 1993
	Stefan LeFors	38	2001 2002 2003 2004
10	John Madeya	34	1970 1971 1972

Single season
Rk	Player	TDs	Year
1	Teddy Bridgewater	31	2013
2	Brian Brohm	30	2007
	Lamar Jackson	30	2016
4	Chris Redman	29	1998
	Chris Redman	29	1999
6	Dave Ragone	27	2000
	Teddy Bridgewater	27	2012
	Lamar Jackson	27	2017
9	Dave Ragone	24	2002
10	Dave Ragone	23	2001
	Tyler Shough	23	2024

Single game
Rk	Player	TDs	Year	Opponent
1	Chris Redman	6	1998	East Carolina
	Lamar Jackson	6	2016	Charlotte
3	12 times by 7 players	5	Most recent: Jack Plummer, 2023 vs. Boston College	

== Rushing ==
=== Rushing yards ===
Career
Rk	Player	Yards	Years
1	Lamar Jackson	4,132	2015 2016 2017
2	Walter Peacock	3,204	1972 1973 1974 1975
3	Malik Cunningham	3,184	2018 2019 2020 2021 2022
4	Nathan Poole	2,958	1975 1976 1977 1978
5	Lenny Lyles	2,786	1954 1955 1956 1957
6	Howard Stevens	2,723	1971 1972
7	**Isaac Brown**	2,614	2024 2025 2026
8	Frank Moreau	2,599	1995 1996 1997 1998 1999
9	Tom Lucia	2,542	1947 1948 1949 1950
10	Michael Bush	2,508	2003 2004 2005 2006

Single season
Rk	Player	Yards	Year
1	Lamar Jackson	1,601	2017
2	Lamar Jackson	1,571	2016
3	Javian Hawkins	1,525	2019
4	Howard Stevens	1,429	1971
5	Bilal Powell	1,405	2010
6	Nathan Poole	1,394	1978
7	Howard Stevens	1,294	1972
	Walter Peacock	1,294	1973
9	Frank Moreau	1,289	1999
10	Lenny Lyles	1,207	1957

Single game
Rk	Player	Yards	Year	Opponent
1	Anthony Allen	275	2007	Middle Tennessee
2	Nathan Poole	269	1978	Wichita State
3	Calvin Prince	263	1976	Drake
4	Howard Stevens	260	1971	Southern Illinois
5	Howard Stevens	258	1972	Cincinnati
6	Lenny Lyles	247	1955	Toledo
7	Isaac Brown	235	2026	Florida State
8	Javian Hawkins	233	2019	Syracuse
9	Lamar Jackson	226	2015	Texas A&M (Music City Bowl)
10	Malik Cunningham	224	2021	Duke

=== Rushing touchdowns ===
Career
Rk	Player	TDs	Years
1	Lamar Jackson	50	2015 2016 2017
	Malik Cunningham	50	2018 2019 2020 2021 2022
3	Lenny Lyles	42	1954 1955 1956 1957
4	Michael Bush	39	2003 2004 2005 2006
5	Eric Shelton	30	2003 2004
6	Anthony Shelman	27	1991 1992 1993 1994
	Frank Moreau	27	1995 1996 1997 1998 1999
8	Brandon Radcliff	26	2013 2014 2015 2016
9	Howard Stevens	25	1971 1972
10	Ken Porco	24	1957 1958 1959

Single season
Rk	Player	TDs	Year
1	Michael Bush	23	2005
2	Lamar Jackson	21	2016
3	Lenny Lyles	20	1957
	Eric Shelton	20	2004
	Malik Cunningham	20	2021
6	Leroy Collins	19	1998
7	Lamar Jackson	18	2017
8	Frank Moreau	17	1999
9	Nathan Poole	15	1978
	Anthony Shelman	15	1994

Single game
Rk	Player	TDs	Year	Opponent
1	C. N. Caldwell	5	1913	Western Kentucky
	Fred Koster	5	1926	Rose Poly
	Fred Koster	5	1926	Ogden
	Leroy Collins	5	1998	Western Kentucky
	Eric Shelton	5	2004	East Carolina
6	Nathan Poole	4	1978	Northwestern State
	Frank Moreau	4	1997	East Carolina
	Eric Shelton	4	2004	Memphis
	Michael Bush	4	2005	West Virginia
	Senorise Perry	4	2012	Pittsburgh
	Lamar Jackson	4	2016	Syracuse
	Lamar Jackson	4	2016	Florida State

== Receiving ==
=== Receptions ===
Career
Rk	Player	Rec	Years
1	Arnold Jackson	300	1997 1998 1999 2000
2	Ibn Green	217	1996 1997 1998 1999
3	J. R. Russell	186	2001 2002 2003 2004
4	Eli Rogers	176	2011 2012 2013 2014
5	Miguel Montano	175	1994 1995 1996 1997
6	Harry Douglas	173	2004 2005 2006 2007
7	Joshua Tinch	162	2002 2003 2004 2005
8	DeVante Parker	156	2011 2012 2013 2014
9	Dez Fitzpatrick	154	2017 2018 2019 2020
10	Jamie Asher	153	1991 1992 1993 1994

Single season
Rk	Player	Rec	Year
1	Arnold Jackson	101	1999
2	Arnold Jackson	90	1998
3	J. R. Russell	75	2003
4	J. R. Russell	73	2004
5	Deion Branch	72	2001
	Chris Bell	72	2025
7	Deion Branch	71	2000
	Harry Douglas	71	2007
9	Jamie Asher	70	1994
	Harry Douglas	70	2006
	Tutu Atwell	70	2019

Single game
Rk	Player	Rec	Year	Opponent
1	Ibn Green	15	1998	East Carolina
	Arnold Jackson	15	1999	Cincinnati
3	Miguel Montano	14	1996	Southern Miss
	Miguel Montano	14	1997	Cincinnati
5	Ibn Green	13	1999	Memphis
	Joshua Tinch	13	2005	West Virginia
	Harry Douglas	13	2007	Kentucky
8	Ralph Dawkins	12	1992	Florida
	Jamie Asher	12	1994	Kentucky
	Arnold Jackson	12	1998	Tulane
	Harry Douglas	12	2007	Syracuse
	Chris Bell	12	2025	Virginia

=== Receiving yards ===
Career
Rk	Player	Yards	Years
1	Arnold Jackson	3,670	1997 1998 1999 2000
2	Harry Douglas	2,924	2004 2005 2006 2007
3	Ibn Green	2,830	1996 1997 1998 1999
4	DeVante Parker	2,775	2011 2012 2013 2014
5	J. R. Russell	2,619	2001 2002 2003 2004
6	Dez Fitzpatrick	2,589	2017 2018 2019 2020
7	Jaylen Smith	2,561	2015 2016 2017 2018
8	Tutu Atwell	2,307	2017 2018 2019 2020
9	Miguel Montano	2,305	1994 1995 1996 1997
10	Mario Urrutia	2,271	2005 2006 2007

Single season
Rk	Player	Yards	Year
1	Tutu Atwell	1,276	2019
2	Harry Douglas	1,265	2006
3	J. R. Russell	1,213	2003
4	Arnold Jackson	1,209	1999
5	Deion Branch	1,188	2001
6	Arnold Jackson	1,165	1998
7	Harry Douglas	1,159	2007
8	Mark Clayton	1,112	1982
9	Tyler Hudson	1,034	2022
10	Deion Branch	1,016	2000

Single game
Rk	Player	Yards	Year	Opponent
1	Harry Douglas	223	2007	Kentucky
2	Ibn Green	214	1998	East Carolina
	DeVante Parker	214	2014	Florida State
4	Harry Douglas	205	2007	Syracuse
5	Cookie Brinkman	197	1970	Marshall
6	Miguel Montano	194	1996	Southern Miss
	Arnold Jackson	194	1999	Illinois
	Deion Branch	194	2000	Cincinnati
	Jamari Staples	194	2015	Pittsburgh
10	Mark Clayton	193	1982	Tennessee State

=== Receiving touchdowns ===
Career
Rk	Player	TDs	Years
1	Ibn Green	33	1996 1997 1998 1999
	DeVante Parker	33	2011 2012 2013 2014
3	Arnold Jackson	31	1997 1998 1999 2000
4	Anthony Cummings	25	1987 1988 1989 1990
5	Dez Fitzpatrick	21	2017 2018 2019 2020
	Tutu Atwell	21	2017 2018 2019 2020
7	J. R. Russell	19	2001 2002 2003 2004
8	Deion Branch	18	2000 2001
	Marshon Ford	18	2019 2020 2021 2022
10	Gary Barnidge	17	2004 2005 2006 2007

Single season
Rk	Player	TDs	Year
1	Ibn Green	12	1998
	DeVante Parker	12	2013
	Tutu Atwell	12	2019
4	Anthony Cummings	10	1990
	Arnold Jackson	10	1998
	DeVante Parker	10	2012
7	Kevin Cook	9	1993
	LaVell Boyd	9	1999
	Arnold Jackson	9	1999
	Deion Branch	9	2000
	Deion Branch	9	2001
	Dez Fitzpatrick	9	2017
	Ja'Corey Brooks	9	2024

Single game
Rk	Player	TDs	Year	Opponent
1	Anthony Cummings	5	1990	Cincinnati
2	LaVell Boyd	4	1999	Houston

== Total offense ==
Total offense is the sum of passing and rushing statistics. It does not include receiving or returns.

=== Total offense yards ===
Career
Rk	Player	Yards	Years
1	Lamar Jackson	13,175	2015 2016 2017
2	Malik Cunningham	12,848	2018 2019 2020 2021 2022
3	Chris Redman	12,129	1996 1997 1998 1999
4	Brian Brohm	10,819	2004 2005 2006 2007
5	Teddy Bridgewater	9,987	2011 2012 2013
6	Dave Ragone	9,161	1999 2000 2001 2002
7	Stefan LeFors	6,609	2001 2002 2003 2004
8	Jay Gruden	6,564	1985 1986 1987 1988
9	Jeff Brohm	5,410	1989 1990 1991 1992 1993
10	Ed Rubbert	4,979	1983 1984 1985 1986

Single season
Rk	Player	Yards	Year
1	Lamar Jackson	5,261	2017
2	Lamar Jackson	5,114	2016
3	Teddy Bridgewater	4,048	2013
4	Chris Redman	4,009	1998
5	Brian Brohm	3,978	2007
6	Malik Cunningham	3,972	2021
7	Teddy Bridgewater	3,744	2012
8	Stefan LeFors	3,550	2003
9	Chris Redman	3,537	1999
10	Jack Plummer	3,238	2023

Single game
Rk	Player	Yards	Year	Opponent
1	Lamar Jackson	610	2016	Syracuse
2	Chris Redman	578	1998	East Carolina
3	Brian Brohm	549	2007	Syracuse
4	Malik Cunningham	527	2021	Duke
5	Lamar Jackson	525	2017	North Carolina
6	Lamar Jackson	512	2017	Boston College
7	Stefan LeFors	493	2003	TCU
8	Chris Redman	491	1998	Memphis
	Lamar Jackson	491	2017	Wake Forest
10	Lamar Jackson	485	2017	Purdue

=== Touchdowns responsible for ===
"Touchdowns responsible for" is the official NCAA term for combined passing and rushing touchdowns. Louisville's football guide uses this specific term.

Career
Rk	Player	TDs	Years
1	Malik Cunningham	120	2018 2019 2020 2021 2022
2	Lamar Jackson	119	2015 2016 2017
3	Chris Redman	87	1996 1997 1998 1999
4	Dave Ragone	83	1999 2000 2001 2002
5	Brian Brohm	80	2004 2005 2006 2007
6	Teddy Bridgewater	78	2011 2012 2013
7	Jay Gruden	48	1985 1986 1987 1988
8	Jeff Brohm	44	1989 1990 1991 1992 1993
	Stefan LeFors	44	2001 2002 2003 2004
10	Michael Bush	42	2003 2004 2005 2006
	Lenny Lyles	42	1954 1955 1956 1957

Single season
Rk	Player	TDs	Year
1	Lamar Jackson	51	2016
2	Lamar Jackson	45	2017
3	Malik Cunningham	39	2021
4	Dave Ragone	33	2000
	Brian Brohm	33	2007
6	Teddy Bridgewater	32	2013
7	Chris Redman	31	1998
8	Chris Redman	30	1999
9	Teddy Bridgewater	28	2012
	Malik Cunningham	28	2019

Single game
Rk	Player	TDs	Year	Opponent
1	Lamar Jackson	8	2016	Charlotte
2	Lamar Jackson	7	2016	Marshall
	Lamar Jackson	7	2016	Boston College
	Malik Cunningham	7	2021	Duke
5	Chris Redman	6	1998	East Carolina
	Lamar Jackson	6	2017	North Carolina
	Malik Cunningham	6	2019	Syracuse
	Jack Plummer	6	2023	Boston College
9	Numerous times	5	Most recent: Malik Cunningham, 2021 vs. Syracuse	

== Defense ==
=== Interceptions ===
Career
Rk	Player	Ints	Years
1	Anthony Floyd	18	1999 2000 2001 2002
2	Sam Madison	16	1993 1994 1995 1996
3	Leon Williams	15	1978 1979 1980 1981
	Ray Buchanan	15	1989 1990 1991 1992
5	Rashad Holman	14	1997 1998 1999 2000
	Gerod Holliman	14	2013 2014
7	John Gailey	12	1987 1988 1989 1990
8	Dan Bednarski	11	1966 1967
	Mike Detenber	11	1967 1968 1969
	Sebastian Curry	11	1980 1981 1982
	Kerry Rhodes	11	2001 2002 2003 2004

Single season
Rk	Player	Ints	Year
1	Gerod Holliman	14	2014
2	Anthony Floyd	10	2000
3	Ray Buchanan	8	1991
4	Wally Oyler	7	1966
	A. J. Jacobs	7	1974
	Kirk Perry	7	1983
	Anthony Bridges	7	1993
	Sam Madison	7	1995

Single game
Rk	Player	Ints	Year	Opponent
1	Tom Giannini	5	1933	Eastern Kentucky
2	Kirk Perry	3	1983	Army
	Anthony Floyd	3	2000	Southern Miss
	Gerod Holliman	3	2014	Boston College

=== Tackles ===
Career
Rk	Player	Tackles	Years
1	Doug Buffone	495	1962 1963 1964 1965
2	Mark Sander	488	1987 1988 1989 1990
3	Otis Wilson	484	1977 1978 1979
4	Eddie Johnson	457	1977 1978 1979 1980
5	Ricky Skiles	415	1975 1976 1977 1978 1979
6	Jeff Henry	408	1976 1977 1978 1979
7	Tyrus McCloud	403	1993 1994 1995 1996
8	Pat Fitzgerald	385	1987 1988 1989 1990
9	Tom Jackson	373	1970 1971 1972
10	C. J. Avery	350	2017 2018 2019 2020 2021

Single season
Rk	Player	Tackles	Year
1	Doug Buffone	201	1965
2	Doug Buffone	177	1964
3	Otis Wilson	175	1977
4	Ricky Skiles	167	1979
	Mark Sander	167	1988
6	Matt Battaglia	166	1986
7	Anthony Williams	159	1982
8	Otis Wilson	157	1978
9	Terry Rice-Locket	155	1997
10	Matt Battaglia	153	1985

Single game
Rk	Player	Tackles	Year	Opponent
1	Doug Buffone	35	1965	Kent State
2	Tom Jackson	30	1971	North Texas
3	Mike Detenber	27	1967	Southern Illinois
4	Matt Battaglia	24	1986	Illinois
4	Eddie Johnson	24	1979	Drake
4	Matt Battaglia	22	1986	Indiana
5	Alan Campos	22	1994	Army
	Terry Rice-Locket	22	1997	Illinois
	Lamar Myles	22	2007	Kentucky
8	Tyrus McCloud	21	1996	Kentucky
	Bud Herring	21	1998	East Carolina

=== Sacks ===
Career
Rk	Player	Sacks	Years
1	Dewayne White	37.5	2000 2001 2002
2	Elvis Dumervil	32.0	2002 2003 2004 2005
3	Michael Josiah	31.0	1999 2000 2001
4	Mike Flores	30.5	1987 1988 1989 1990
5	Kendrick Gholston	29.0	1994 1995 1996 1997
6	Ashton Gillotte	26.5	2021 2022 2023 2024
7	Joe Johnson	25.0	1991 1992 1993
8	Marcus Smith	24.0	2010 2011 2012 2013
9	Yasir Abdullah	23.5	2018 2019 2020 2021 2022
10	Marcus Jones	23.0	2001 2002 2003 2004

Single season
Rk	Player	Sacks	Year
1	Elvis Dumervil	20.0	2005
2	Joe Johnson	17.0	1993
3	Dewayne White	15.0	2001
4	Marcus Smith	14.5	2013
5	Mike Flores	14.0	1990
6	Mike Flores	13.0	1989
	Michael Josiah	13.0	2000
8	Dewayne White	12.0	2000

Single game
Rk	Player	Sacks	Year	Opponent
1	Elvis Dumervil	6.0	2005	Kentucky
2	Mike Flores	5.0	1990	Murray State
3	Rodney Gnat	4.0	2010	Eastern Kentucky
	Richard Tharpe	4.0	1981	Florida State
	Ted Washington	4.0	1989	Wyoming
	Joe Johnson	4.0	1993	Arizona State
	Joe Johnson	4.0	1993	San Jose State
	Carl Powell	4.0	1996	Memphis

== Kicking ==
=== Field goals made ===
Career
Rk	Player	FGs	Years
1	John Wallace	66	2012 2013 2014 2015
2	Art Carmody	60	2004 2005 2006 2007
3	Blanton Creque	51	2016 2017 2018 2019
4	James Turner	47	2020 2021 2022
5	Nate Smith	44	2000 2001 2002 2003
6	Ron Bell	36	1987 1988 1989 1990
7	David Akers	35	1993 1994 1995 1996
	Brock Travelstead	35	2020 2021 2022 2023 2024
9	Chris Philpott	32	2008 2009 2010 2011
10	Wilbur Summers	24	1972 1973 1974 1975

Single season
Rk	Player	FGs	Year
1	Art Carmody	21	2006
	Cooper Ranvier	21	2025
3	John Wallace	20	2013
	James Turner	20	2022
5	Brock Travelstead	18	2024
6	Blanton Creque	17	2017
	Brock Travelstead	17	2023
8	Blanton Creque	16	2016
	John Wallace	16	2012
10	Ron Bell	15	1989
	John Wallace	15	2014
	John Wallace	15	2015

Single game
Rk	Player	FGs	Year	Opponent
1	Nate Smith	4	2000	Houston
	Art Carmody	4	2005	Pittsburgh
	Chris Philpott	4	2010	Connecticut
	Blanton Creque	4	2016	NC State
	James Turner	4	2021	Virginia
	James Turner	4	2021	NC State
	Brock Travelstead	4	2023	Georgia Tech
	Brock Travelstead	4	2023	Notre Dame
	Brock Travelstead	4	2024	Clemson
	Cooper Ranvier	4	2025	California

=== Field goal percentage ===
While past Louisville media guides have included this statistic, the 2021 edition does not include any listings over any time frame.

Career
Rk	Player	FG%	Years
1	Cooper Ranvier	84.0%	2024 2025
2	Blanton Creque	82.3%	2016 2017 2018 2019
3	Art Carmody	82.2%	2004 2005 2006 2007
4	James Turner	79.7%	2020 2021 2022
5	John Wallace	77.6%	2012 2013 2014 2015
6	Danny Cerione	76.9%	1983 1984 1985 1986
7	Klaus Wilmsmeyer	73.3%	1988 1989 1990 1991
8	Chris Philpott	72.7%	2008 2009 2010 2011
9	Dave Betz	72.2%	1979 1980
10	Brock Travelstead	71.4%	2020 2021 2022 2023 2024

Single season
Rk	Player	FG%	Year
1	James Turner	90.9%	2022
2	James Turner	86.7%	2020
3	Blanton Creque	85.0%	2017
4	Blanton Creque	84.2%	2016
5	Art Carmody	84.0%	2006
	Cooper Ranvier	84.0%	2025
7	Blanton Creque	83.3%	2018
8	John Wallace	83.3%	2013
9	John Wallace	78.9%	2014
10	Chris Philpott	77.8%	2010
