= List of Louisville Cardinals in the NFL draft =

This is a list of Louisville Cardinals football players in the NFL draft.

B	Back	K	Kicker	NT	Nose tackle
C	Center	LB	Linebacker	FB	Fullback
DB	Defensive back	P	Punter	HB	Halfback
DE	Defensive end	QB	Quarterback	WR	Wide receiver
DT	Defensive tackle	RB	Running back	G	Guard
E	End	T	Offensive tackle	TE	Tight end

== Selections ==
Year	Round	Pick	Overall	Player	Team	Position
1942	14	1	121	Clure Mosher	Pittsburgh Steelers	C
1949	13	9	130	Bob Todd	Chicago Cardinals	T
1950	18	12	234	Joe Travue	Cleveland Browns	B
1952	28	4	329	Johnny Brewer	Philadelphia Eagles	B
1953	19	4	221	Jimmy Williams	Pittsburgh Steelers	B
1955	9	5	102	Johnny Unitas	Pittsburgh Steelers	QB
1956	9	11	108	Maury Woolford	Los Angeles Rams	T
1957	26	5	306	Joe Unitas	Baltimore Colts	T
1958	1	11	11	Lenny Lyles	Baltimore Colts	B
1958	18	2	207	Mario Cheppo	Chicago Cardinals	E
1959	26	6	306	Ed Young	San Francisco 49ers	E
1960	19	6	222	Howard Turley	Pittsburgh Steelers	E
1961	16	3	213	Ron Petty	Washington Redskins	T
1961	18	6	244	John Finn	Chicago Bears	T
1962	14	14	196	Ernie Green	Green Bay Packers	B
1964	1	9	9	Ken Kortas	St. Louis Cardinals	T
1964	19	6	258	Dick Schott	Minnesota Vikings	E
1965	17	4	228	Tom LaFramboise	Chicago Bears	QB
1966	4	12	60	Doug Buffone	Chicago Bears	LB
1966	6	11	91	Charles Johnson	San Francisco 49ers	DT
1966	17	7	252	Benny Russell	St. Louis Cardinals	QB
1967	2	13	39	Tom Holzer	San Francisco 49ers	T
1967	13	19	334	Bill Downes	Philadelphia Eagles	DT
1967	15	12	379	Clarence Spencer	San Francisco 49ers	WR
1968	3	16	71	Ed Harmon	Dallas Cowboys	LB
1968	6	7	145	John Neidert	Cincinnati Bengals	LB
1968	10	1	247	Wayne Patrick	Cincinnati Bengals	RB
1968	15	14	395	Clarence Spencer	San Francisco 49ers	WR
1969	6	7	137	Wally Oyler	Atlanta Falcons	DB
1970	3	7	59	Lee Bouggess	Philadelphia Eagles	RB
1970	7	16	172	Cleo Walker	Green Bay Packers	C
1970	17	15	431	David Sanks	San Diego Chargers	G
1971	12	19	305	Horace Jones	Oakland Raiders	DT
1972	4	13	91	Larry Ball	Miami Dolphins	DE
1972	6	24	154	Amos Martin	Minnesota Vikings	LB
1973	4	10	88	Tom Jackson	Denver Broncos	LB
1973	14	13	351	John Madeys	Atlanta Falcons	QB
1973	16	3	393	Howard Stevens	New Orleans Saints	RB
1974	5	23	127	Richard Bishop	Cincinnati Bengals	DT
1975	13	20	332	A.J. Jacobs	Los Angeles Rams	DB
1975	15	26	390	Marty Smith	Pittsburgh Steelers	DT
1976	15	15	418	Wilbur Summers	Denver Broncos	P
1978	11	14	292	Cal Prince	Cincinnati Bengals	RB
1979	6	24	161	Dwayne Woodruff	Pittsburgh Steelers	DB
1979	10	2	250	Nathan Poole	Cincinnati Bengals	RB
1980	1	19	19	Otis Wilson	Chicago Bears	LB
1980	11	6	283	Ricky Skiles	Green Bay Packers	LB
1982	12	8	314	Donnie Craft	Houston Oilers	RB
1983	8	27	223	Mark Gregory Clayton	Miami Dolphins	WR
1983	10	9	260	Richard Tharpe	Buffalo Bills	DT
1984	4	14	98	Tom Andrews	Chicago Bears	G
1984	5	26	138	Dean May	Miami Dolphins	QB
1985	6	27	167	Ron Davenport	Miami Dolphins	RB
1986	2	7	34	Ernest Givins	Houston Oilers	WR
1987	1	23	23	Bruce Armstrong	New England Patriots	T
1990	2	17	42	Carwell Gardner	Buffalo Bills	RB
1991	1	25	25	Ted Washington	San Francisco 49ers	DT
1991	2	7	34	Browning Nagle	New York Jets	QB
1991	11	14	292	Jerry Crafts	Indianapolis Colts	T
1991	11	20	298	Mike Flores	Philadelphia Eagles	DE
1992	12	3	311	Klaus Wilmsmeyer	Tampa Bay Buccaneers	P
1993	3	9	65	Ray Buchanan	Indianapolis Colts	DB
1993	6	9	149	Deral Boykin	Los Angeles Rams	DB
1994	1	13	13	Joe Johnson	New Orleans Saints	DE
1995	5	3	137	Jamie Asher	Washington Redskins	TE
1996	3	5	66	Roman Oben	New York Giants	G
1996	5	35	167	Alan Campos	Dallas Cowboys	LB
1997	2	14	44	Sam Madison	Miami Dolphins	DB
1997	4	22	118	Tyrus McCloud	Baltimore Ravens	LB
1997	5	26	156	Carl Powell	Indianapolis Colts	DE
1997	7	37	238	Leland Taylor	Baltimore Ravens	DT
2000	3	13	75	Chris Redman	Baltimore Ravens	QB
2000	4	21	115	Frank Moreau	Kansas City Chiefs	RB
2001	6	16	179	Rashad Holman	San Francisco 49ers	DB
2002	2	33	65	Deion Branch	New England Patriots	WR
2003	2	32	64	Dewayne White	Tampa Bay Buccaneers	DE
2003	3	24	88	Dave Ragone	Houston Texans	QB
2003	7	3	217	Curry Burns	Houston Texans	DB
2003	7	31	245	Chris Johnson	Green Bay Packers	DB
2005	2	22	54	Eric Shelton	Carolina Panthers	RB
2005	4	20	121	Stefan LeFors	Carolina Panthers	QB
2005	4	22	123	Kerry Rhodes	New York Jets	DB
2005	5	18	154	Robert McCune	Washington Redskins	LB
2005	7	22	236	Lionel Gates	Buffalo Bills	RB
2005	7	39	253	J. R. Russell	Tampa Bay Buccaneers	WR
2006	3	11	75	Jason Spitz	Green Bay Packers	C
2006	4	29	126	Elvis Dumervil	Denver Broncos	DE
2006	5	9	142	Brandon Johnson	Arizona Cardinals	LB
2006	6	13	182	Montavious Stanley	Dallas Cowboys	DT
2007	1	10	10	Amobi Okoye	Houston Texans	DT
2007	4	1	100	Michael Bush	Oakland Raiders	RB
2007	5	11	148	Kolby Smith	Kansas City Chiefs	RB
2007	5	33	170	William Gay	Pittsburgh Steelers	DB
2008	2	25	56	Brian Brohm	Green Bay Packers	QB
2008	3	21	84	Harry Douglas	Atlanta Falcons	WR
2008	5	6	141	Gary Barnidge	Carolina Panthers	TE
2008	5	15	150	Breno Giacomini	Green Bay Packers	T
2008	7	39	246	Mario Urrutia	Cincinnati Bengals	WR
2009	1	28	28	Eric Wood	Buffalo Bills	C
2009	5	34	170	George Bussey	New England Patriots	T
2011	3	24	88	Johnny Patrick	New Orleans Saints	DB
2011	4	29	126	Bilal Powell	New York Jets	RB
2011	6	10	175	Byron Stingily	Tennessee Titans	T
2012	7	25	232	Greg Scruggs	Seattle Seahawks	DE
2014	1	18	18	Calvin Pryor	New York Jets	DB
2014	1	26	26	Marcus Smith	Philadelphia Eagles	DE
2014	1	32	32	Teddy Bridgewater	Minnesota Vikings	QB
2014	3	9	73	Preston Brown	Buffalo Bills	LB
2015	1	14	14	DeVante Parker	Miami Dolphins	WR
2015	3	8	72	Jamon Brown	St. Louis Rams	T
2015	3	17	81	John Miller	Buffalo Bills	G
2015	3	18	82	Lorenzo Mauldin	New York Jets	LB
2015	4	5	104	James Sample	Jacksonville Jaguars	DB
2015	6	1	177	Deiontrez Mount	Tennessee Titans	LB
2015	6	13	189	Charles Gaines	Cleveland Browns	DB
2015	6	17	193	B. J. Dubose	Minnesota Vikings	DE
2015	7	22	239	Gerod Holliman	Pittsburgh Steelers	DB
2015	7	39	256	Gerald Christian	Arizona Cardinals	TE
2016	1	12	12	Sheldon Rankins	New Orleans Saints	DL
2017	6	29	213	Colin Holba	Pittsburgh Steelers	LS
2017	7	12	230	Josh Harvey-Clemons	Washington Redskins	DB
2018	1	18	18	Jaire Alexander	Green Bay Packers	DB
2018	1	32	32	Lamar Jackson	Baltimore Ravens	QB
2018	3	10	74	Geron Christian	Washington Redskins	T
2018	6	31	205	Trevon Young	Los Angeles Rams	DE
2020	1	11	11	Mekhi Becton	New York Jets	T
2021	2	25	57	Tutu Atwell	Los Angeles Rams	WR
2021	3	4	109	Dez Fitzpatrick	Tennessee Titans	WR
2023	3	19	82	YaYa Diaby	Tampa Bay Buccaneers	DE
2023	5	1	136	Yasir Abdullah	Jacksonville Jaguars	LB
2023	6	3	180	Kei'Trel Clark	Arizona Cardinals	DB
2024	4	29	129	Isaac Guerendo	San Francisco 49ers	RB
2024	5	11	146	Jarvis Brownlee Jr.	Tennessee Titans	DB
2024	5	21	156	Jamari Thrash	Cleveland Browns	WR
2024	6	29	205	Jawhar Jordan	Houston Texans	RB
2025	2	8	40	Tyler Shough	New Orleans Saints	QB
2025	3	2	66	Ashton Gillotte	Kansas City Chiefs	DE
2025	4	29	131	Quincy Riley	New Orleans Saints	DB
2026	3	30	94	Chris Bell	Miami Dolphins	WR

== Notable undrafted players ==
Note: No drafts held before 1920

Debut year	Player name	Position	Debut NFL/AFL team	Notes
1963	Lee Calland	CB	Minnesota Vikings	—
1972	Cookie Brinkman	WR	Cleveland Browns	—
1974	Steve Reese	LB	New York Jets	—
1978	Kevin Miller	WR	Minnesota Vikings	—
1981	Joe Jacoby	T	Washington Redskins	—
1984	Frank Minnifield	CB	Cleveland Browns	—
1985	Pete McCartney	T	Dallas Cowboys	—
1986	Anthony Copeland	LB	Washington Redskins	—
1987	Matt Battaglia	LB	Philadelphia Eagles	—
1987	Curtis Jeffries	TE	Cincinnati Bengals	—
1987	Ed Rubbert	QB	Washington Redskins	—
1991	Mark Sander	LB	Miami Dolphins	—
1991	Joey Smith	WR	New York Giants	—
1994	Aaron Bailey	WR	Indianapolis Colts	—
1994	Jeff Brohm	QB	San Diego Chargers	—
1994	Jim Hanna	DT	New Orleans Saints	—
1994	Garin Patrick	C	Indianapolis Colts	—
1997	David Akers	K	Atlanta Falcons	—
1997	Rico Clark	DB	Indianapolis Colts	—
2000	LaVell Boyd	WR	Cincinnati Bengals	—
2000	Jon Hilbert	K	Dallas Cowboys	—
2001	Arnold Jackson	WR	Arizona Cardinals	—
2003	Anthony Floyd	S	Indianapolis Colts	—
2004	Ronnie Ghent	TE	Philadelphia Eagles	—
2004	Richard Owens	TE	Minnesota Vikings	—
2005	Tiger Jones	WR	Washington Redskins	—
2008	Lamar Myles	LB	Jacksonville Jaguars	—
2012	Josh Bellamy	WR	Chicago Bears	—
2015	Eli Rogers	WR	Pittsburgh Steelers	—
2022	Qwynnterrio Cole	SS	Las Vegas Raiders	—
2023	Malik Cunningham	QB	New England Patriots	—
2023	Tiyon Evans	RB	Los Angeles Rams	—
2024	Storm Duck	CB	Miami Dolphins	—
2024	Jack Plummer	QB	Carolina Panthers	—
2025	Ja'Corey Brooks	WR	Washington Commanders	—
2025	Thor Griffith	DT	Seattle Seahawks	—
2025	Mark Redman	TE	Los Angeles Rams	—
2025	Corey Thornton	CB	Carolina Panthers	—
2026	Wesley Bailey	OLB	Los Angeles Rams	—
2026	Rene Konga	DL	Miami Dolphins	—
2026	Caullin Lacy	WR	New York Jets	—
2026	Rasheed Miller	OT	Tennessee Titans	—
2026	Miller Moss	QB	Chicago Bears	—
2026	Pete Nygra	C	Kansas City Chiefs	—
2026	TJ Quinn	LB	Green Bay Packers	—
2026	Trevonte Sylvester	OT	Baltimore Ravens	—
