= Harry Douglas =

American football player (born 1984)

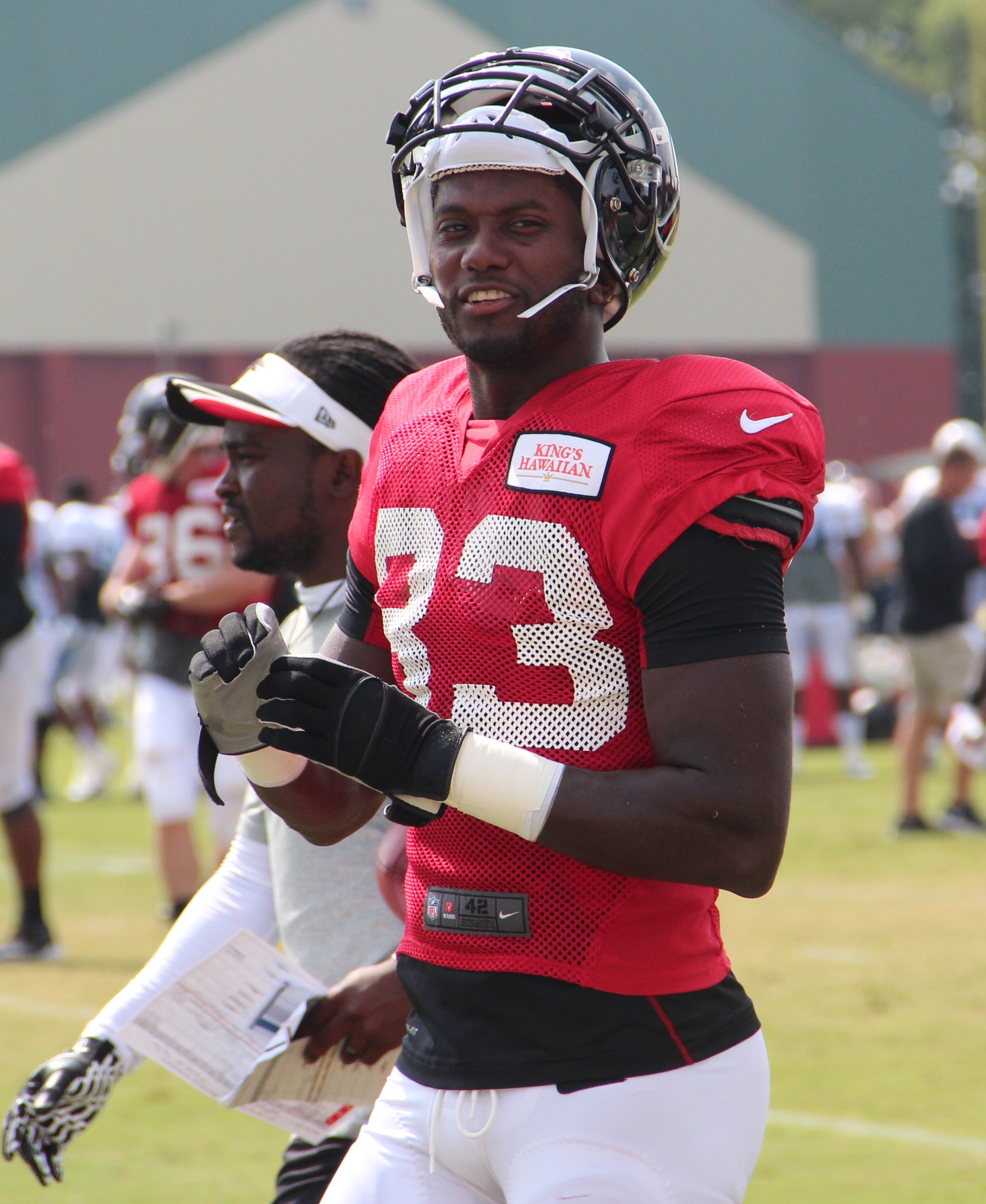
- Douglas with the Atlanta Falcons in 2014

No. 83
- Positions: Wide receiver, punt returner

Personal information
- Born: September 16, 1984 (age 42); Tampa, Florida, U.S.
- Listed height: 6 ft 0 in (1.83 m)
- Listed weight: 183 lb (83 kg)

Career information
- High school: Jonesboro (Jonesboro, Georgia)
- College: Louisville (2003–2007)
- NFL draft: 2008: 3rd round, 84th overall pick

Career history
- Atlanta Falcons (2008–2014); Tennessee Titans (2015–2017)

Awards and highlights
- Second-team All-American (2007); 2× All-Big East (2006, 2007)

Career NFL statistics
- Receptions: 310
- Receiving yards: 3,759
- Receiving touchdowns: 10
- Stats at Pro Football Reference

Harry Douglas IV (born September 16, 1984) is an American former professional football player who was a wide receiver for 10 seasons in the National Football League (NFL). He played college football for the Louisville Cardinals.

Douglas was selected by the Atlanta Falcons in the third round of the 2008 NFL draft. He played for the Falcons for seven seasons before playing another three seasons with the Tennessee Titans. He now works as an NFL analyst for ESPN and host on ESPN Radio.

== Early life ==
Douglas attended Jonesboro High School in Jonesboro, Georgia. Douglas played basketball in high school. In football, he accumulated 80 catches for 1,539 yards and 14 touchdowns over a 3-year career. He was awarded a scholarship to the University of Louisville in 2003.

He is the brother of Toney Douglas, who last played point guard for the Memphis Grizzlies of the National Basketball Association (NBA) and currently plays for Liga Portuguesa de Basquetebol, a professional club of a Portuguese basketball league. Harry and Toney are the sixth pair of brothers to play in the NFL and NBA.

== College career ==
Douglas saw no action in 2003, red shirting, and spending the entire year on the scout team.

In his first year of action, Douglas played in 12 games as a wideout and caught 5 passes for a total of 43 yards. He played special teams as well. His scored a 65-yard touchdown run on a reverse in the 2004 AutoZone Liberty Bowl in Memphis, Tennessee that helped propelled the team to a 44–40 victory and a #6 final AP ranking in the team's last year as a member of Conference USA.

Douglas saw an increased role in 2005 with the departure of J. R. Russell. His first career receiving touchdown came in a 3 catch, 91 yard performance against Oregon State in which the Cardinals won, 63–27. Against arch-rival Cincinnati, he had a (then) career-high 5 catches for 87 yards and a touchdown in a 46–22 victory. Douglas finished the year with 27 catches for 457 yards.

As a junior, he started the year with a 26-yard run off a reverse against Kentucky that set up a 48-yard score by Michael Bush in a 59–28 win. Against Miami, despite scoring no touchdowns, he caught 4 passes for 94 yards on his birthday. He caught a touchdown pass from Hunter Cantwell the next week at Kansas State in a 24–6 win, and went on to catch 5 more, 2 in the season finale against Connecticut. In the 2007 Orange Bowl, he registered a personal best and an Orange Bowl best 10 catches for 165 yards in a 24–13 Cardinals win.

Douglas started off 2007 catching 5 balls for 151 yards and 2 scores in a win over Murray State. He caught a touchdown pass in each of his team's next 3 games against MTSU, Kentucky, and Syracuse. In the game against Syracuse in September 2007, he suffered an ankle injury and had to be carted off the field. He was forced to miss subsequent practices. He later returned on October 13 against Cincinnati, catching 7 passes for 118 yards. To close out the year, he caught a touchdown in a 24–17 win over Pitt. He caught 8 receptions for 136 yards and 1 touchdown in a loss to South Florida. After the year, he was invited to the Under Armour Senior Bowl in Mobile, Alabama along with teammate Brian Brohm. Douglas graduated from Louisville with a degree in Political Science.

=== Awards and honors ===
- 2006 1st team All-Big East
- 2007 1st team All-Big East
- 2007 2nd Team AP All-American

== Professional career ==
Pre-draft measurables
Height	Weight	Arm length	Hand span	40-yard dash	10-yard split	20-yard split	20-yard shuttle	Three-cone drill	Vertical jump	Broad jump	Bench press
5 ft 11 1/4 in (1.81 m)	176 lb (80 kg)	32 1/4 in (0.82 m)	8 1/4 in (0.21 m)	4.51 s	1.54 s	2.58 s	4.12 s	6.57 s	31.0 in (0.79 m)	10 ft 0 in (3.05 m)	11 reps
All values from NFL Combine/Pro Day

=== Atlanta Falcons ===
==== 2008 ====
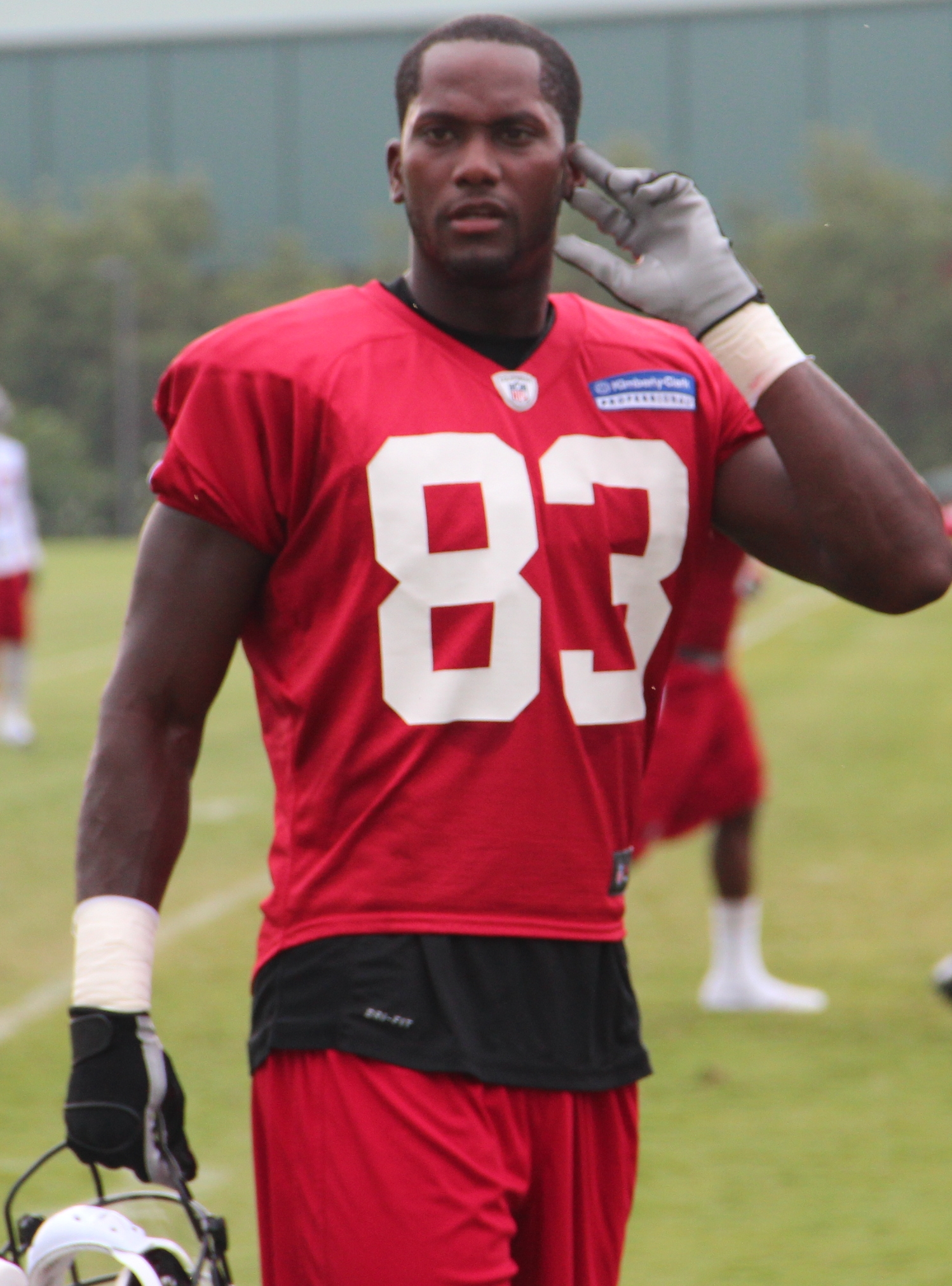
Douglas in 2013

He was drafted by the Atlanta Falcons in the third round of the 2008 NFL draft. Douglas scored his first 2 career touchdowns in a Week 12 meeting against the Carolina Panthers. He first found the end zone on a seven-yard end around in the first quarter to give the Falcons a 10–0 lead. Douglas then became the 10th player in Falcons history to return a punt for a touchdown and the first since 2004 when Allen Rossum returned a punt 61 yards in the fourth quarter. Douglas return was the longest in his career, topping the previous mark of 33 yards against New Orleans Saints in Week 10. Along with a 61-yard punt return, Douglas totaled career-highs in offensive touches with six, two rushing, four receiving and all purpose yards 188 which included three rushing, 92 receiving and 93 yards on punt returns, He finished the game with 92 receiving yards, which led the team and fell four yards short of his career-high (96 vs. Chicago, October 12). Douglas was named NFC Special Teams Player of the Week for his performance against the Panthers. Douglas finished his rookie season with 19 returns for 226 yards and a touchdown, he also caught 23 passes for 329 yards and a touchdown.

==== 2009 ====
During the fifth day of the Falcons' training camp, Douglas was taken off the field after injuring his left knee while working in a one-on-one drill. The Falcons confirmed the next day that Douglas will be out for the 2009 season and placed on injured reserve.

==== 2012 ====
During the 2012 season, in week 15, Douglas caught three passes, totaling 83 yards, helping the Falcons defeat the New York Giants 34–0. It was, at the time, the worst shutout loss to a defending Super Bowl champion team in NFL history.

==== 2013 ====
Douglas had a career-year in 2013. He played in all 16 games and racked up 1,067 yards on 85 receptions with 2 touchdowns (all career highs). The apparent cause of this heavy workload was the injury bug the Falcons' receiving corps caught early on in the season. Julio Jones and Roddy White were both plagued with injuries most of the year, with Jones suffering a season ending fractured foot in Week 5. The Falcons finished the season 4–12.

On February 27, 2015, Douglas was released by the Falcons.

=== Tennessee Titans ===
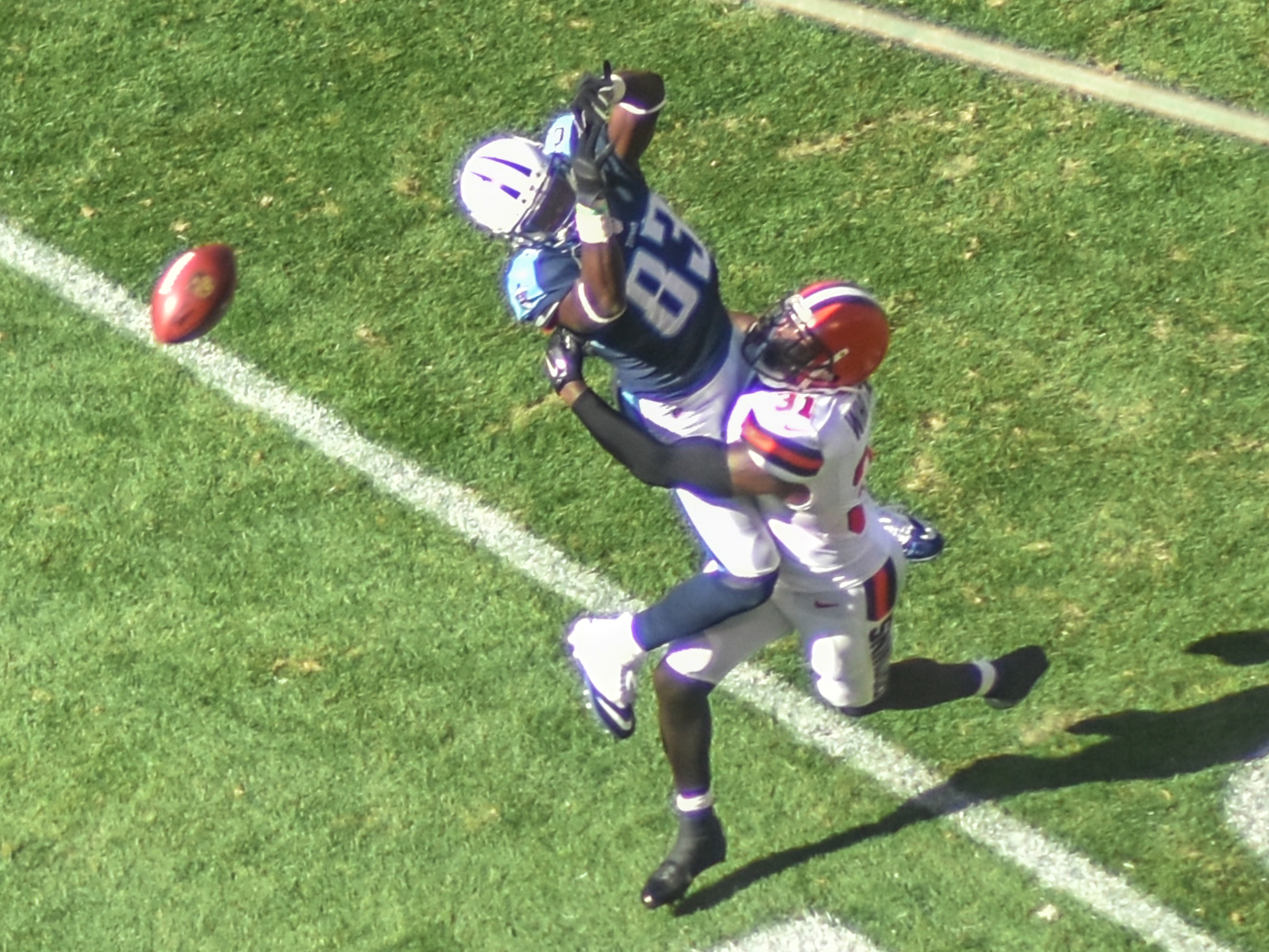
Douglas attempting a catch vs. the Browns in 2015

==== 2015 ====
On March 10, 2015, Douglas signed a three-year contract with the Tennessee Titans.

==== 2016 ====
On December 11, 2016, during a game against the Denver Broncos, Douglas became the subject of controversy when he dove directly at the knees of Broncos cornerback Chris Harris Jr. Harris immediately went down but later returned to the game. After that play, a brief scuffle ensued between Douglas and Broncos cornerback Aqib Talib. Many current and former players, as well as journalists considered the hit "dirty". He was not fined for the incident. He finished the season with 15 receptions for 210 yards and no touchdowns.

==== 2017 ====
On September 3, 2017, Douglas was placed on injured reserve with a knee injury. He was activated off injured reserve to the active roster on November 25, 2017. He finished the season playing in two games making one reception in a week 12 victory against the Indianapolis Colts for eight yards. He also played in the week 13 victory against the Houston Texans, but recorded no stats.

== Career statistics ==
=== NFL ===
Season	Team	Games		Receiving					Rushing					Fumbles	
Season	Team	GP	GS	Rec	Yds	Avg	Lng	TD	Att	Yds	Avg	Lng	TD	FUM	Lost
2008	ATL	16	0	23	320	13.9	69	1	12	69	5.8	33	--	1	1
2009	ATL	Did not play due to injury													
2010	ATL	16	4	22	294	13.4	46	1	2	-5	-2.5	0	--	--	--
2011	ATL	16	4	39	498	12.8	49	1	1	3	3.0	3	--	--	--
2012	ATL	15	1	38	395	10.4	37	1	2	4	2.0	5	--	1	0
2013	ATL	16	11	85	1,067	12.6	80T	2	--	--	--	--	--	3	2
2014	ATL	12	6	51	556	10.9	41	2	--	--	--	--	--	--	--
2015	TEN	14	12	36	411	11.4	51	2	1	-6	-6.0	--	--	2	1
2016	TEN	11	2	15	210	14.0	35	0	--	--	--	--	--	--	--
2017	TEN	2	0	1	8	8.0	8	0	--	--	--	--	--	--	--
Total		118	40	310	3,759	12.1	80	10	18	65	3.6	33	0	7	4

=== College ===
Year	Team	Games	Receiving				Rushing			
Year	Team	Games	Rec	Yds	Avg	TD	Att	Yds	Avg	TD
2004	Louisville	11	5	43	8.6	0	1	65	65.0	1
2005	Louisville	12	27	457	16.9	2	6	37	6.2	0
2006	Louisville	13	70	1,265	18.1	6	7	49	7.0	0
2007	Louisville	10	71	1,159	16.3	7	5	11	2.2	0
Career		46	173	2,924	16.9	15	19	162	8.5	1
