= 2018 Louisville Cardinals football team =

American college football season

2018 Louisville Cardinals football
- Conference: Atlantic Coast Conference
- Atlantic Division
- Record: 2–10 (0–8 ACC)
- Head coach: Bobby Petrino (9th season; first 10 games); Lorenzo Ward (interim; remainder of season)
- Co-offensive coordinators: Lonnie Galloway (3rd season); Mike Summers (2nd season)
- Offensive scheme: Multiple
- Defensive coordinator: Brian VanGorder (1st season)
- Base defense: 4–3
- Home stadium: Cardinal Stadium

Uniform
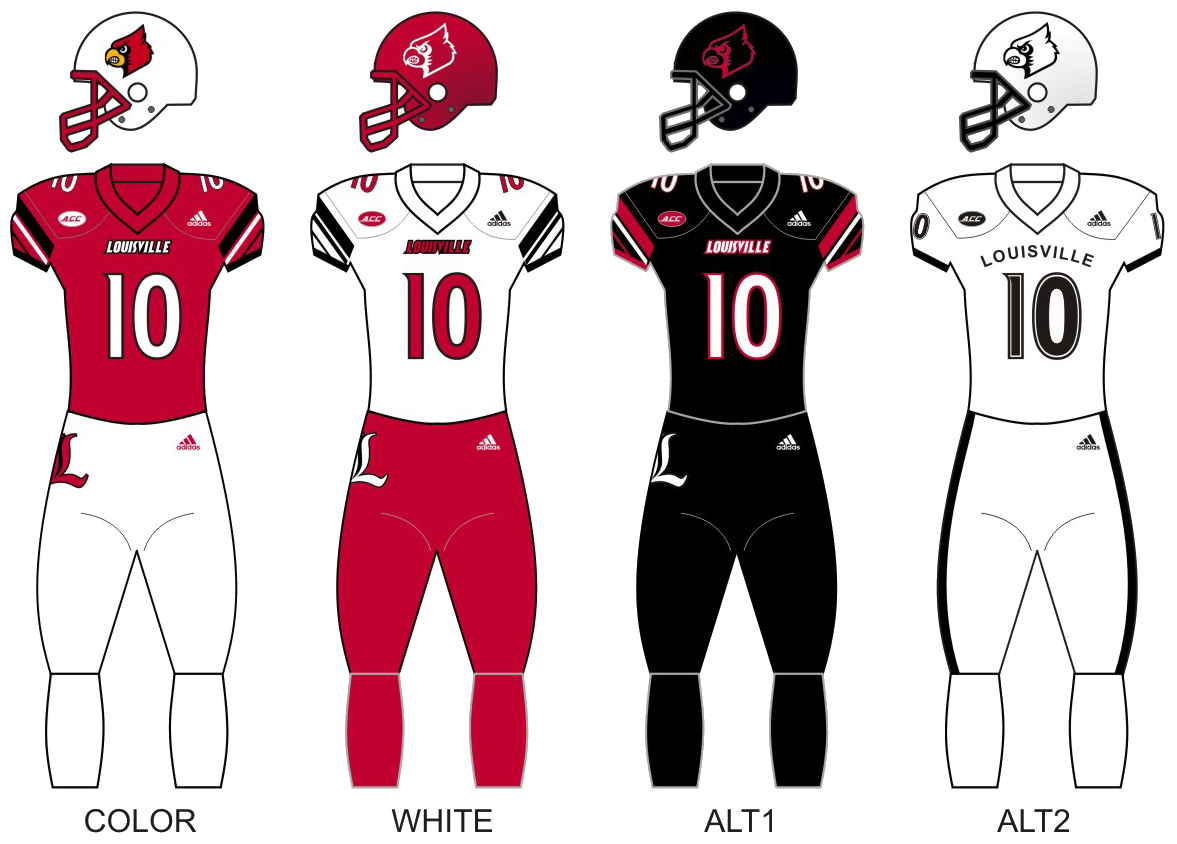

2018 Atlantic Coast Conference football standings
	Conf.			Overall
Team	W		L	W		L
Atlantic Division
No. 1 Clemson x$#^	8	–	0	15	–	0
No. 15 Syracuse	6	–	2	10	–	3
NC State	5	–	3	9	–	4
Boston College	4	–	4	7	–	5
Wake Forest	3	–	5	7	–	6
Florida State	3	–	5	5	–	7
Louisville	0	–	8	2	–	10
Coastal Division
Pittsburgh x	6	–	2	7	–	7
Georgia Tech	5	–	3	7	–	6
Miami (FL)	4	–	4	7	–	6
Virginia	4	–	4	8	–	5
Virginia Tech	4	–	4	6	–	7
Duke	3	–	5	8	–	5
North Carolina	1	–	7	2	–	9
Championship: Clemson 42, Pittsburgh 10
# – College Football Playoff champion; ^ – College Football Playoff participant; $ – Conference champion; x – Division champion/co-champions; Rankings from AP Poll

The 2018 Louisville Cardinals football team represented the University of Louisville during the 2018 NCAA Division I FBS football season. The Cardinals competed in the Atlantic Division of the Atlantic Coast Conference. They played their home games at Cardinal Stadium (previously Papa John's Cardinal Stadium) in Louisville, Kentucky. They were led by head coach Bobby Petrino until he was fired on November 11 after starting the season 2–8. Lorenzo Ward was the interim head coach for the remainder of the season. They finished the season 2–10, 0–8 in ACC play to finish in last place in the Atlantic Division.

On December 4, Louisville hired Appalachian State head coach Scott Satterfield for the head coaching job.

== Offseason ==
=== Coaching changes ===
On January 13, 2018, the Cardinals announced the hiring of Ryan Beard as new safeties coach. On January 29, 2018, the Cardinals announced the hiring of Brian VanGorder as new defensive coordinator, replacing former DC Peter Sirmon. On February 2, 2018, the Cardinals announced the hiring of Grady Brown as defensive assistant and recruiting coordinator.

On November 11 Louisville fired Bobby Petrino.

=== Departures ===
Notable departures from the 2017 squad included:

Name	Number	Pos.	Height	Weight	Year	Hometown	Notes
Lamar Jackson	8	Quarterback	6'3"	211	Junior	Pompano Beach, Florida	Declared for 2018 NFL Draft

=== 2019 NFL draft ===
Cardinals who were picked in the 2019 NFL Draft:

Round	Pick	Player	Position	Team

=== Recruits ===
The Cardinals signed a total of 23 recruits.

College recruiting (2018)
Name	Hometown	School	Height	Weight	Commit date
Marcus Riley; WR	Tallahassee, Florida	James S. Rickards High School	5 ft 10 in (1.78 m)	165 lb (75 kg)	Jul 7, 2016
Marcus Riley; WR	Recruit ratings: Scout: Rivals: 247Sports: ESPN:				
Trenell Troutman; S	Miami, Florida	St. Thomas Aquinas High School	5 ft 10 in (1.78 m)	188 lb (85 kg)	Jul 9, 2016
Trenell Troutman; S	Recruit ratings: Scout: Rivals: 247Sports: ESPN:				
Michael Boykin; DE	Carrollton, Georgia	Gulf Coast State College	6 ft 6 in (1.98 m)	285 lb (129 kg)	May 19, 2017
Michael Boykin; DE	Recruit ratings: Scout: Rivals: 247Sports: ESPN:				
Yasir Abdullah; LB	Miami, Florida	Carol City High School	6 ft 1 in (1.85 m)	220 lb (100 kg)	May 28, 2017
Yasir Abdullah; LB	Recruit ratings: Scout: Rivals: 247Sports: ESPN:				
Jordan Travis; QB	West Palm Beach, Florida	The Benjamin School	6 ft 2 in (1.88 m)	185 lb (84 kg)	Jun 10, 2017
Jordan Travis; QB	Recruit ratings: Scout: Rivals: 247Sports: ESPN:				
Jared Goldwire; DT	Tacoma, Washington	Fort Scott Community College	6 ft 7 in (2.01 m)	280 lb (130 kg)	Jun 11, 2017
Jared Goldwire; DT	Recruit ratings: Scout: Rivals: 247Sports: ESPN:				
Dejmi Dumervil-Jean; DT	Lauderdale Lakes, Florida	St. Thomas Aquinas High School	6 ft 5 in (1.96 m)	350 lb (160 kg)	Jun 11, 2017
Dejmi Dumervil-Jean; DT	Recruit ratings: Scout: Rivals: 247Sports: ESPN:				
Robert Hicks; LB	Miami, Florida	Central High School	6 ft 0 in (1.83 m)	237 lb (108 kg)	Jul 4, 2017
Robert Hicks; LB	Recruit ratings: Scout: Rivals: 247Sports: ESPN:				
Thurman Geathers; DE	Acworth, Georgia	North Cobb High School	6 ft 3 in (1.91 m)	218 lb (99 kg)	Jul 4, 2017
Thurman Geathers; DE	Recruit ratings: Scout: Rivals: 247Sports: ESPN:				
Chandler Jones; CB	Miami, Florida	Central High School	5 ft 10 in (1.78 m)	173 lb (78 kg)	Jul 27, 2017
Chandler Jones; CB	Recruit ratings: Scout: Rivals: 247Sports: ESPN:				
Telly Plummer; CB	Riverdale, Georgia	Langston Hughes High School	6 ft 0 in (1.83 m)	185 lb (84 kg)	Jul 28, 2017
Telly Plummer; CB	Recruit ratings: Scout: Rivals: 247Sports: ESPN:				
Javian Hawkins; RB	Titusville, Florida	Cocoa High School	5 ft 9 in (1.75 m)	185 lb (84 kg)	Aug 7, 2017
Javian Hawkins; RB	Recruit ratings: Scout: Rivals: 247Sports: ESPN:				
Jarrett Jackson; DE	Palm Beach Gardens, Florida	Palm Beach Gardens Community High School	6 ft 6 in (1.98 m)	275 lb (125 kg)	Aug 14, 2017
Jarrett Jackson; DE	Recruit ratings: Scout: Rivals: 247Sports: ESPN:				
Tutu Atwell; WR	Miami, Florida	Northwestern High School	5 ft 8 in (1.73 m)	155 lb (70 kg)	Aug 21, 2017
Tutu Atwell; WR	Recruit ratings: Scout: Rivals: 247Sports: ESPN:				
Adonis Boone; OT	Daytona Beach, Florida	Mainland High School	6 ft 5 in (1.96 m)	285 lb (129 kg)	Sep 24, 2017
Adonis Boone; OT	Recruit ratings: Scout: Rivals: 247Sports: ESPN:				
Hassan Hall; RB	Atlanta, Georgia	Maynard H. Jackson High School	5 ft 11 in (1.80 m)	190 lb (86 kg)	Oct 31, 2017
Hassan Hall; RB	Recruit ratings: Scout: Rivals: 247Sports: ESPN:				
Tyler Harrell; WR	Miami, Florida	Columbus High School	6 ft 0 in (1.83 m)	165 lb (75 kg)	Nov 6, 2017
Tyler Harrell; WR	Recruit ratings: Scout: Rivals: 247Sports: ESPN:				
Nigel Kilby; TE	Fort Wayne, Indiana	Garden City Community College	6 ft 8 in (2.03 m)	250 lb (110 kg)	Dec 10, 2017
Nigel Kilby; TE	Recruit ratings: Scout: Rivals: 247Sports: ESPN:				
Allen Love; DT	Birmingham, Alabama	Huffman High School	6 ft 3 in (1.91 m)	285 lb (129 kg)	Dec 14, 2017
Allen Love; DT	Recruit ratings: Scout: Rivals: 247Sports: ESPN:				
Quen Head; LB	Forsyth, Georgia	Hutchinson Community College	6 ft 2 in (1.88 m)	215 lb (98 kg)	Dec 19, 2017
Quen Head; LB	Recruit ratings: Scout: Rivals: 247Sports: ESPN:				
Jatavious Harris; WR	Milledgeville, Georgia	Baldwin High School	6 ft 2 in (1.88 m)	176 lb (80 kg)	Dec 19, 2017
Jatavious Harris; WR	Recruit ratings: Scout: Rivals: 247Sports: ESPN:				
Jairus Brents; CB	Louisville, Kentucky	Waggener High School	5 ft 10 in (1.78 m)	178 lb (81 kg)	Feb 7, 2018
Jairus Brents; CB	Recruit ratings: Scout: Rivals: 247Sports: ESPN:				
Marlon Character Jr. S	Atlanta, Georgia	Northwest Mississippi Community College	6 ft 0 in (1.83 m)	190 lb (86 kg)	Feb 7, 2018
Marlon Character Jr. S	Recruit ratings: Scout: Rivals: 247Sports: ESPN:				
Overall recruit ranking:
Note: In many cases, Scout, Rivals, 247Sports, On3, and ESPN may conflict in their listings of height and weight.; In these cases, the average was taken. ESPN grades are on a 100-point scale.; Sources: "2018 Team Ranking". Rivals.com.

== Preseason ==
=== Award watch lists ===
Listed in the order that they were released

Award	Player	Position	Year
Fred Biletnikoff Award	Dez Fitzpatrick	WR	(redshirt) So.
Fred Biletnikoff Award	Jaylen Smith	WR	Sr.
John Mackey Award	Kemari Averett	TE	So.
John Mackey Award	Micky Crum	TE	(redshirt) Sr.
Lou Groza Award	Blanton Creque	K	(redshirt) Jr.
Wuerffel Trophy	Jonathan Greenard	DL	(redshirt) Jr.

=== ACC media poll ===
The ACC media poll was released on July 24, 2018.

Media poll (Atlantic)
Predicted finish	Team	Votes (1st place)
1	Clemson	1,031 (145)
2	Florida State	789 (1)
3	NC State	712 (2)
4	Boston College	545
5	Louisville	422
6	Wake Forest	413
7	Syracuse	232

== Schedule ==
The Cardinals' 2018 schedule consisted of 7 home games and 5 away games, including the first game of the season being played in Orlando, Florida at Camping World Stadium, a neutral-site venue. The Cardinals first non-conference game was an away game, against Alabama of the Southeastern Conference (SEC), before hosting the remaining three non-conference games; against FCS opponent Indiana State from the Missouri Valley Football Conference (MVFC), Western Kentucky of Conference USA (C-USA) and against arch-rival Kentucky of the SEC.

Date	Time	Opponent	Site	TV	Result	Attendance
September 1	8:00 p.m.	vs. No. 1 Alabama*	Camping World Stadium; Orlando, FL (Camping World Kickoff)	ABC	L 14–51	57,280
September 8	7:00 p.m.	Indiana State*	Cardinal Stadium; Louisville, KY	ACCN Extra	W 31–7	44,520
September 15	7:30 p.m.	Western Kentucky*	Cardinal Stadium; Louisville, KY	ACCRSN	W 20–17	54,923
September 22	12:30 p.m.	at Virginia	Scott Stadium; Charlottesville, VA	ACCRSN	L 3–27	34,446
September 29	3:30 p.m.	Florida State	Cardinal Stadium; Louisville, KY	ESPN2	L 24–28	52,798
October 5	7:00 p.m.	Georgia Tech	Cardinal Stadium; Louisville, KY	ESPN	L 31–66	51,658
October 13	12:30 p.m.	at Boston College	Alumni Stadium; Chestnut Hill, MA	ACCRSN	L 20–38	31,478
October 27	12:00 p.m.	Wake Forest^{†}	Cardinal Stadium; Louisville, KY	ACCRSN	L 35–56	49,603
November 3	12:00 p.m.	at No. 2 Clemson	Memorial Stadium; Clemson, SC	ABC	L 16–77	78,741
November 9	7:00 p.m.	at No. 13 Syracuse	Carrier Dome; Syracuse, NY	ESPN2	L 23–54	42,797
November 17	12:20 p.m.	NC State	Cardinal Stadium; Louisville, KY	ACCN	L 10–52	48,265
November 24	7:00 p.m.	No. 17 Kentucky*	Cardinal Stadium; Louisville, KY (Governor's Cup)	ESPN2	L 10–56	49,988
*Non-conference game; ^{†}Homecoming; Rankings from AP Poll released prior to the game; All times are in Eastern time

== Game summaries ==
=== vs Alabama ===
	1	2	3	4	Total
Cardinals	0	0	7	7	14
No. 1 Crimson Tide	14	14	16	7	51

=== Indiana State ===
	1	2	3	4	Total
Sycamores	7	0	0	0	7
Cardinals	7	0	7	17	31

=== Western Kentucky ===
	1	2	3	4	Total
Hilltoppers	7	7	0	3	17
Cardinals	0	3	3	14	20

=== At Virginia ===
	1	2	3	4	Total
Cardinals	0	0	3	0	3
Cavaliers	0	6	7	14	27

=== Florida State ===
	1	2	3	4	Total
Seminoles	7	0	7	14	28
Cardinals	7	14	3	0	24

=== Georgia Tech ===
	1	2	3	4	Total
Yellow Jackets	21	10	14	21	66
Cardinals	0	17	0	14	31

=== At Boston College ===
	1	2	3	4	Total
Cardinals	13	7	0	0	20
Eagles	14	10	0	14	38

=== Wake Forest ===
	1	2	3	4	Total
Demon Deacons	21	14	21	0	56
Cardinals	7	14	14	0	35

=== At Clemson ===
	1	2	3	4	Total
Cardinals	3	0	6	7	16
No. 2 Tigers	14	21	28	14	77

=== At Syracuse ===
	1	2	3	4	Total
Cardinals	0	7	7	9	23
No. 13 Orange	7	30	7	10	54

=== NC State ===
	1	2	3	4	Total
Wolfpack	7	10	21	14	52
Cardinals	3	0	0	7	10

=== Kentucky ===
	1	2	3	4	Total
No. 17 Wildcats	14	21	0	21	56
Cardinals	7	3	0	0	10
