= Marty Smith (American football) =

American football player (born 1953)

No. 72, 79, 64
- Position: Defensive tackle

Personal information
- Born: October 20, 1953 (age 73); Pattison, Mississippi, U.S.
- Listed height: 6 ft 3 in (1.91 m)
- Listed weight: 250 lb (113 kg)

Career information
- High school: East (Cleveland, Ohio)
- College: Louisville
- NFL draft: 1975: 15th round, 390th overall pick

Career history
- Pittsburgh Steelers (1975)*; Charlotte Hornets (1975); Buffalo Bills (1976); Winnipeg Blue Bombers (1977–1978); Toronto Argonauts (1978); Cleveland Browns (1979)*
- * Offseason or practice squad member only
- Stats at Pro Football Reference

Martin Joseph Smith (born October 20, 1953) is an American former professional football defensive tackle who played for the Buffalo Bills of the National Football League (NFL). He played college football for the Louisville Cardinals and was selected by the Pittsburgh Steelers in the 15th round of the 1975 NFL draft.

== Early life ==
Martin Joseph Smith was born on October 20, 1953, in Pattison, Mississippi. He attended East High School in Cleveland, Ohio.

== College career ==
Smith enrolled at the University of Louisville to play college football for the Cardinals. On September 8, 1971, Smith was a co-winner of the Cardinal football team's annual "Wimpy Championship", a hamburger eating contest. Smith tied with John Clabaugh after eating 10.5 hamburgers within 30 minutes. Smith was a three-year varsity letterman from 1972 to 1974.

== Professional career ==
Smith was selected by the Pittsburgh Steelers in the 15th round, with the 390th overall pick, of the 1975 NFL draft. He signed with the team on May 7. He missed a day of training camp on July 15 due to dehydration. Smith was released on August 19, 1975, after the third of seven preseason games.

Smith signed with the Charlotte Hornets of the World Football League (WFL) later in August. He played in eight games for the Hornets during the 1975 WFL season as a reserve defensive tackle before the league folded.

In May 1976, Smith "strode purposefully" into the sports department of The Louisville Times and asked for a list of addresses of NFL general managers. He was signed by the Buffalo Bills on June 18, 1976. He played in all 14 games, starting 12, for the Bills during the 1976 season, recording 4.5 sacks and one fumble recovery. Buffalo finished the year with a 2–12 record. Smith was released on September 6, 1977, after the fifth of six preseason games.

On October 1, 1977, it was reported that Smith had signed with the Winnipeg Blue Bombers of the Canadian Football League (CFL). He played the next day against the BC Lions and "look[ed] good" for 20 minutes before suffering a season-ending knee injury. He reported to training camp in 1978 with his knee still hindering him. After Elton Brown was traded to the Toronto Argonauts, Smith started the August 29, 1978, game against the Montreal Alouettes. He only played in two games overall for Winnipeg in 1978.

On October 17, 1978, Smith started a five-day trial with the Argonauts. He played in the final two games for the Argonauts in 1978.

On July 17, 1979, Smith signed with the Cleveland Browns. He was released on August 7 after the first game of the 1979 preseason.
