= Hunter Cantwell =

American football player and coach (born 1985)

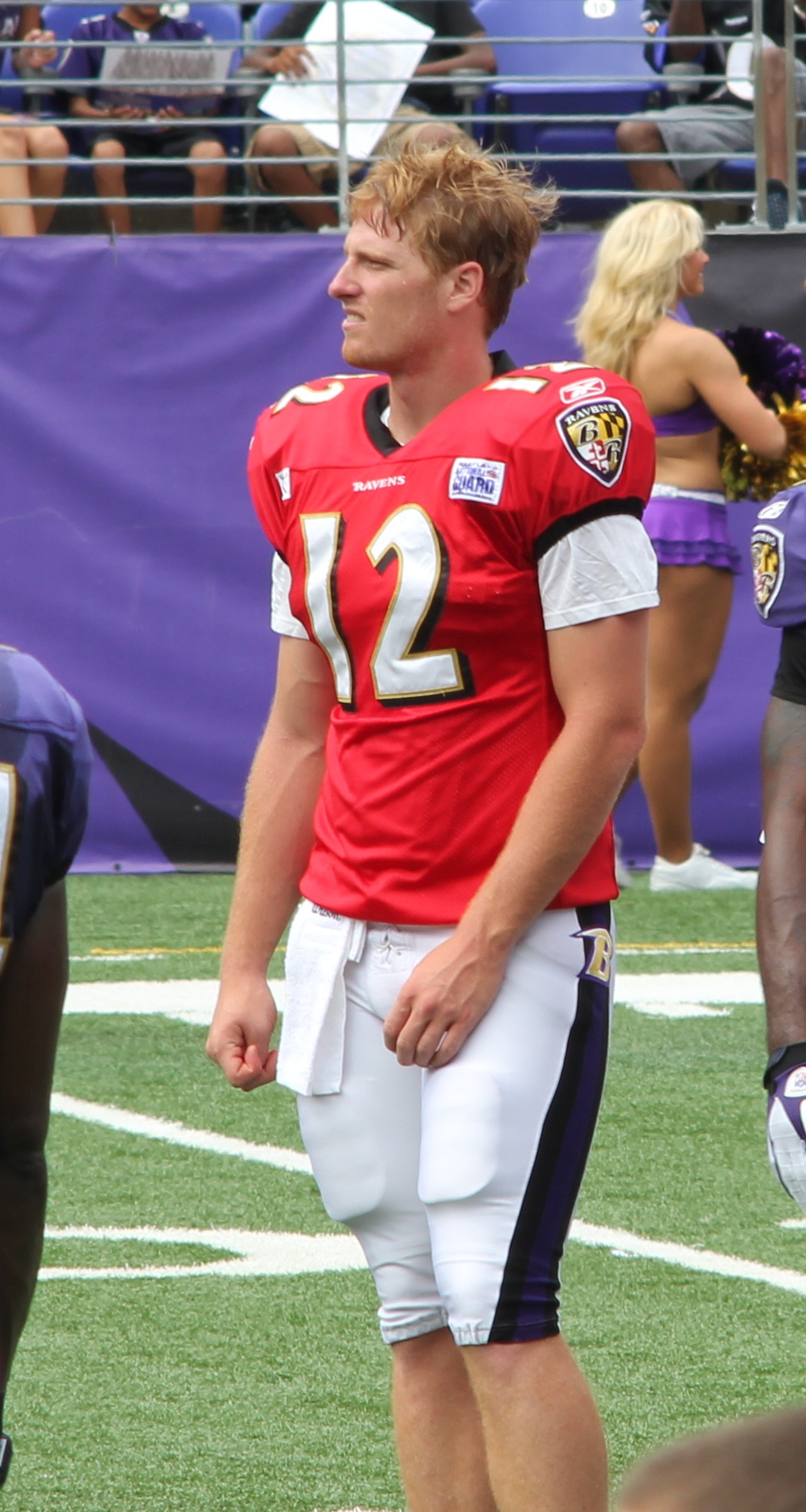
- Cantwell during practice at M&T Bank Stadium in 2011

No. 12
- Position: Quarterback

Personal information
- Born: December 30, 1985 (age 40); Chattanooga, Tennessee, U.S.
- Listed height: 6 ft 4 in (1.93 m)
- Listed weight: 236 lb (107 kg)

Career information
- High school: Paducah Tilghman (Paducah, Kentucky)
- College: Louisville
- NFL draft: 2009: undrafted

Career history

Playing
- Carolina Panthers (2009–2010); Baltimore Ravens (2010–2011)*; Owensboro Rage (2013)*
- * Offseason or practice squad member only

Coaching
- Campbellsville (2012–2013) Quarterbacks coach; Campbellsville (2014–2016) Quarterbacks coach & special teams coordinator; Carroll County HS (KY) (2017–2018) Head coach; Christian Academy (KY) (2019–present) Head coach
- Stats at Pro Football Reference

Hunter Cantwell (born December 30, 1985) is an American former player who was a quarterback in the National Football League (NFL). After playing college football for the Louisville Cardinals, he was signed by the Carolina Panthers as an undrafted free agent in 2009. He spent most of the 2009 season on the team's practice squad, and was promoted to the active roster late in the season. Cantwell was signed to the Baltimore Ravens' practice squad in 2010 and 2011 before becoming the quarterbacks coach for Campbellsville University. Later on, Cantwell served as head coach at Carroll County High in Kentucky in 2017 and 2018, and is currently the head coach at Christian Academy of Louisville.

== Early life ==
Cantwell prepped at Paducah Tilghman High School in Paducah, Kentucky, where he became the school's all-time passing leader, completing 458–756 passes, for 7,272 yards, and 70 touchdowns. He set the Kentucky 3-A state playoff record for passing yards in a game (409) while going 31–8 as a starter.

== College career ==
Cantwell walked on to the Louisville Cardinals football team prior to the 2005 season. On November 25, 2005, QB Brian Brohm injured his leg in a game against Syracuse and was out for the rest of the season. Cantwell stepped in and completed 3 of 5 passes for 66 yards, helping the Cardinals to a 41–17 victory. On December 2, 2005, Cantwell started the season finale on the road against Connecticut, completing 16 of 25 passes for 271 yards and 1 touchdown, aiding Louisville in a 30–20 win. In the 2006 Gator Bowl against Virginia Tech, Cantwell played well, throwing for 216 yards and 3 touchdowns. Despite his efforts, Virginia Tech won the game, 35–24. He was voted the Cardinals MVP of the Gator Bowl.

=== 2006 ===
On September 16, 2006, after Brohm suffered a thumb injury against Miami, Cantwell went into the game and completed 3 of 4 passes for 113 yards and 1 touchdown. Louisville defeated Miami, 31–7. Cantwell started the next two games for the Cardinals, both on the road, against Kansas State and Middle Tennessee State. Against the Wildcats, he completed 18 of 26 passes for 173 yards and 1 touchdown in a 24–6 Louisville win. Against the Blue Raiders, Cantwell completed 17 of 32 passes for 340 yards and 3 touchdowns, leading the Cardinals to a 44–17 rout. Cantwell helped lead the Cardinals in winning games for most of the 2006 regular season. The Cardinals finished the season 12–1, losing only to Rutgers, which helped the Cardinals win an Orange Bowl bid, the highest ranked Bowl Game Louisville has played in. The Cardinals won the 2007 Orange Bowl against Wake Forest 24–13 under Brohm.

=== 2007 ===
In 2007, Cantwell played sparingly in a disappointing 6–6 season for the Cardinals. He was nominated for the Johnny Unitas Golden Arm Award and the Maxwell award in the 2008 preseason.

=== 2008 ===
After leading the team to a 5–2 start, the Cards lost their last five games to finish 5–7, making it the first time since 1996-97 the Cardinals football team missed a bowl game in consecutive years.

== Professional career ==
=== Carolina Panthers ===
After going undrafted in the 2009 NFL draft, Cantwell signed a three-year contract with the Carolina Panthers. He was waived during final cuts on September 5 and re-signed to the practice squad the following day. The Panthers promoted Cantwell to the active roster on December 24 after quarterback Jake Delhomme was placed on injured reserve. Cantwell was waived during final cuts on September 4, 2010.

=== Baltimore Ravens ===
On September 5, 2010, Cantwell was signed to the Baltimore Ravens practice squad, waived on September 9, 2010, and then signed back onto the practice squad on September 14, 2010. Cantwell was cut September 3, 2011, and signed to the practice squad again the next day. On September 29, Cantwell was cut from the Ravens' practice squad.

== Coaching career ==
Cantwell had a contract offer from the Jacksonville Jaguars in the 2012 offseason, but chose instead to become the quarterbacks coach for the Campbellsville University football team. He later served as head coach at Carroll County High School in Kentucky from November 2016 to 2018, and was hired as the head coach at Christian Academy of Louisville in March 2019.
