= Art Carmody =

American football player (born 1984)

No. 6
- Position: Placekicker

Personal information
- Born: April 7, 1984 (age 42); Shreveport, Louisiana, U.S.
- Listed height: 5 ft 9 in (1.75 m)
- Listed weight: 180 lb (82 kg)

Career information
- High school: Loyola College (Shreveport, Louisiana)
- College: Louisville (2004–2007)
- NFL draft: 2008: undrafted

Career history
- Bossier–Shreveport Battle Wings (2008–2010)

Awards and highlights
- Lou Groza Award (2006); Second-team All-American (2006); 3× First-team All-Big East (2005–2007)

Arthur Carmody IV (born April 7, 1984) is an American former football placekicker. He played college football for the Louisville Cardinals.

== High school ==
Carmody attended Loyola College Prep, where he was a two-time All-District and All-City selection. As a senior, he made 8 of 11 field goals. Additionally, he was 28-for-28 on extra-point attempts. He was also a pitcher, as he recorded a 10–1 record as a senior. As a junior, he batted .400 with 37 RBIs.

== College career ==
Carmody attended the University of Louisville from 2004 to 2007. During the 2004 season, he ranked second in the nation in scoring among kickers. He holds the NCAA, conference, and school records for consecutive points-after-touchdown (PATs) with 77. He also made 12-of-15 field goals during the season. He continued to break and tie records in 2005. In the 2006 season he won the Lou Groza Award, was First-team in the All-Big East game, was ranked fourth in the nation in scoring, and earned a Big East Special teams Player of the Week recognition. He continued to break school records during the 2006 and 2007 seasons.

He played in his first collegiate game on September 5, 2004, against Kentucky. His first field goal attempt was blocked. He made his first field goal on September 11, 2004, in a 52–21 win over Army.

Kicked a career best 4 field goals on November 3, 2005, in a 42–20 win over Pittsburgh.

Kicked a career long 51-yard field goal on September 9, 2006, in a 62–0 win over Temple.

Carmody made 1 out of 2 field goal attempts as well as 3 out of 3 PAT attempts in a 24–13 victory over Wake Forest in the Orange Bowl on January 2, 2007.

On November 29, 2007, in his last collegiate game, Carmody became the NCAA all-time points leader for a kicker when he kicked a 41-yard field goal in the first quarter of a game against Rutgers. Later in the game, he kicked a game-winning 33-yard field goal in the closing seconds of a 41–38 victory over the Scarlet Knights. It was the only game-winning field goal of his career.

In his four years at Louisville, he made 60 out of 73 field goals and 253 out of 255 extra points. His streak of 97 consecutive extra points is a school record. From 2004 to 2006, he kicked for over 100 points each season. During his senior season, he became the NCAA football all-time leading scorer for a kicker with 433 points. His record was broken by Boise State kicker Kyle Brotzman in 2010.

While at Louisville, he majored in Finance.

=== School records ===
Carmody currently holds 21 of the 22 kicking records at the University of Louisville, missing the record for longest field goal by one yard. His longest field goal was 51 yards.

Record	Statistic	Year
Most points by kicking (game)	16	2005, Louisville vs. Pitt
Most points by kicking (season)	123	2006
Most points by kicking (career)	433	2004–2007
Most PATs attempted (game)	10	2004, Louisville vs. Cincinnati
Most PATs attempted (season)	77	2004
Most PATs attempted (career)	255	2004–2007
Most PATs made (career)	253	2004–2007
Most Consecutive PATs made (season)	77	2004
Most Consecutive PATs made (career)	97	2004–2005
Best PAT percentage (season)	100.0	2004, 2006, 2007
Best PAT percentage (career)	99.2	2004–2007
Most field goals attempted (season)	25	2006
Most field goals attempted (career)	70	2004–2007
Most field goals made (season)	21	2006
Most field goals made (career)	60	2004–2007
Most consecutive field goals made (season)	16	2006
Most consecutive field goals made (career)	16	2006
Best field goal percentage (season)	87.5	2005
Best field goal percentage (career)	82.2	2004–2007

== Professional career ==
In 2008, Carmody joined the af2 and was assigned to the Bossier-Shreveport Battle Wings for their final two regular season games. In 2008, he completed 1 of 4 field goal attempts and 16-of-18 PATs, as well as two tackles.

Then on March 26, 2009, he was reassigned to the team. In the season opener against the Arkansas Twisters, he missed both field goal attempts and made 2-of-5 PATs.

He is also a regular contributor on CardChronicle.com
