= Lamar Myles =

American football player (born 1986)

Profile
- Position: Linebacker

Personal information
- Born: January 7, 1986 (age 40); Winter Haven, Florida, U.S.
- Listed height: 5 ft 11 in (1.80 m)
- Listed weight: 230 lb (104 kg)

Career information
- College: Louisville
- NFL draft: 2008: undrafted

Career history
- Jacksonville Jaguars (2008–2009)*; St. Louis Rams (2009)*; Jacksonville Jaguars (2009)*
- * Offseason or practice squad member only

Lamar Myles (born January 7, 1986) is an American former football linebacker. He was signed by the Jacksonville Jaguars as an undrafted free agent in 2008. He played college football at Louisville.

== Early life ==
Myles graduated from Lake Region High School in Eagle Lake, Florida.

== Professional career ==
=== Jacksonville Jaguars ===
Myles was signed by the Jacksonville Jaguars as an undrafted free agent in 2008. He was waived by the team on August 30 during final cuts. He was re-signed to the team's practice squad on September 17, only to be released a week later on September 24. He was re-signed to the practice squad again on October 6.

He was waived/injured on August 24, 2009, and subsequently reverted to injured reserve. He was released with an injury settlement on August 30. He was re-signed to the practice squad on November 24.
