= Arnold Jackson (American football) =

American football player (born 1977)

No. 84
- Position: Wide receiver

Personal information
- Born: April 9, 1977 (age 49); Jacksonville, Florida, U.S.
- Listed height: 5 ft 8 in (1.73 m)
- Listed weight: 168 lb (76 kg)

Career information
- High school: Andrew Jackson High School (Jacksonville, Florida)
- College: Louisville
- NFL draft: 2001: undrafted

Career history
- Arizona Cardinals (2001–2002)
- Stats at Pro Football Reference

Arnold Jackson (born April 9, 1977) is an American former professional football player who was a wide receiver for two seasons with the Arizona Cardinals of the National Football League (NFL). He played college football for the Louisville Cardinals.

The first player in college football history to total 300 career receptions.
