= Javian Hawkins =

American football player (born 1999)

Profile
- Position: Running back

Personal information
- Born: November 3, 1999 (age 27); Titusville, Florida, U.S.
- Listed height: 5 ft 9 in (1.75 m)
- Listed weight: 196 lb (89 kg)

Career information
- High school: Cocoa (Cocoa, Florida)
- College: Louisville
- NFL draft: 2021: undrafted

Career history
- Atlanta Falcons (2021)*; Tennessee Titans (2021)*; Los Angeles Rams (2021); Saskatchewan Roughriders (2022)
- * Offseason or practice squad member only

Awards and highlights
- Super Bowl champion (LVI)
- Stats at Pro Football Reference

Javian Hawkins (born November 3, 1999) is an American former professional football running back. He played college football for the Louisville Cardinals. He opted out of the remainder of the season in November 2020 and entered the 2021 NFL draft.

== Early life ==
Hawkins originally attended Astronaut High School in Titusville, Florida, before transferring to Cocoa High School in Cocoa, Florida. During his high school career he rushed for over 4,000 yards and 40 touchdowns. Hawkins committed to the University of Louisville to play college football.

== College career ==
Hawkins played in three games his first year at Louisville in 2018 and took a redshirt. As a redshirt freshman in 2019, he broke the school record for rushing yards by a running back in a season with 1,525 on 264 carries and nine touchdowns. Hawkins returned as Louisville's starting running back in 2020. Hawkins opted out of the remainder of the 2020 season prior to the November 21 game against Syracuse. In addition, he decided to forgo his remaining two years of eligibility and enter the 2021 NFL draft.

== Professional career ==
Pre-draft measurables
Height	Weight	Arm length	Hand span	40-yard dash	10-yard split	20-yard split	20-yard shuttle	Three-cone drill	Vertical jump	Broad jump
5 ft 8 1/8 in (1.73 m)	183 lb (83 kg)	29 1/4 in (0.74 m)	7 7/8 in (0.20 m)	4.45 s	1.53 s	2.62 s	4.25 s	6.95 s	36.0 in (0.91 m)	9 ft 8 in (2.95 m)
All values from Pro Day

=== Atlanta Falcons ===
Hawkins signed with the Atlanta Falcons as an undrafted free agent on May 3, 2021. On August 24, the Falcons released Hawkins.

=== Tennessee Titans ===
On August 26, 2021, Hawkins signed with the Tennessee Titans. He was waived on August 31, 2021.

=== Los Angeles Rams ===
On September 20, 2021, Hawkins signed with the Los Angeles Rams practice squad. Hawkins won Super Bowl LVI when the Rams defeated the Cincinnati Bengals.

On February 15, 2022, Hawkins signed a reserve/future contract with the Rams. He was waived on May 4, 2022.

=== Saskatchewan Roughriders ===
On November 10, 2022, Hawkins was signed by the Saskatchewan Roughriders. On June 4, 2023, Hawkins was released by the Roughriders.
