= Howard Stevens =

American football player (born 1950)

- Stevens in 1977

No. 22, 27
- Positions: Running back, return specialist

Personal information
- Born: February 9, 1950 (age 76); Harrisonburg, Virginia, U.S.
- Listed height: 5 ft 5 in (1.65 m)
- Listed weight: 165 lb (75 kg)

Career information
- High school: Harrisonburg
- College: Louisville, Randolph-Macon
- NFL draft: 1973: 16th round, 392nd overall pick

Career history
- New Orleans Saints (1973–1975); Baltimore Colts (1975–1977)

Awards and highlights
- Lead NFL in punt and kick-off returns (1974); Second-team All-American (1972); Louisville Cardinals Ring of Honor

Career NFL statistics
- Games played: 63
- Starts: 0
- Punts returned: 163 (1,559 yards)
- Kickoffs returned: 103 (2,336 yards)
- Yards rushing: 376
- Touchdowns: 4
- Stats at Pro Football Reference

Howard Melvin Stevens Jr. (born February 9, 1950) is an American former professional football player who was a running back and return specialist in the National Football League (NFL) for the New Orleans Saints and Baltimore Colts. He is among the smallest players to have ever played in the NFL and was the smallest player in the league during his five active seasons, 1973 through 1977.

== College ==
Stevens started his college career at Randolph-Macon College, where he was named All-American in 1968 (honorable mention) and 1969 (second-team). On a team that won the Mason–Dixon Conference championship with a 9–0–0 record in his freshman year, he was the league Most Valuable Player as the NCAA College Division leader in scoring and rushing with 142 points and 1,468 yards respectively and was featured in Faces in the Crowd in the January 20, 1969 issue of Sports Illustrated. He transferred to the University of Louisville where he earned a B.A. in Psychology.

Stevens played only two seasons for Louisville but has been inducted into the school's athletic hall of fame. In 1972, Stevens was named to the United Press International, the Walter Camp and the Football News all-American football teams and the Associated Press Second-team. The University of Louisville retired Stevens' jersey in 1972. He set a school record for rushing yards in a season with 1,429 yards in 1971 while scoring 12 touchdowns. He is currently ranked fourth all-time in school history with 2,723 rushing yards and is sixth with 25 career touchdowns.

== NFL ==
Stevens, who was listed at 5 ft 5 in (1.65 m) tall and 165 lb (75 kg)., was selected by the New Orleans Saints in the 16th round (392nd overall) of the 1973 NFL draft. He played two years for the Saints, lead the NFL in 1974 in kick-off and punt returns. In 1975, Stevens was picked up by the Baltimore Colts where he was used exclusively as a kick-off and punt returner. During his tenure in the NFL, he was the league's smallest player. He rushed for a total of 376 yards on 89 carries and scored 4 touchdowns. As a kick returner he ran for 2336 yards on 103 returns. He returned 163 punts for 1,559 yards. He never returned a kick-off or punt for a touchdown.

== Later life ==
After leaving the Baltimore Colts, Stevens remained in the Baltimore area. He and his wife Joyce have three adult children.
