= Lenny Lyles =

American football player (1936–2011)

- Lyles in 1961

No. 26, 43
- Positions: Cornerback, return specialist, halfback

Personal information
- Born: January 26, 1936; Nashville, Tennessee, U.S.
- Died: November 20, 2011 (aged 75); Louisville, Kentucky, U.S.
- Listed height: 6 ft 2 in (1.88 m)
- Listed weight: 202 lb (92 kg)

Career information
- High school: Central (Louisville)
- College: Louisville (1954–1957)
- NFL draft: 1958: 1st round, 11th overall pick

Career history
- Baltimore Colts (1958); San Francisco 49ers (1959–1960); Baltimore Colts (1961–1969)

Awards and highlights
- 2× NFL champion (1958, 1968); Pro Bowl (1966); NFL kickoff return yards leader (1959); First-team All-American (1957); Louisville Cardinals Ring of Honor

Career NFL statistics
- Interceptions: 16
- Fumble recoveries: 13
- Return yards: 2,161
- Total touchdowns: 8
- Stats at Pro Football Reference

Leonard Everett Lyles (January 26, 1936 – November 20, 2011) was an American professional football player who was a cornerback for 12 seasons in the National Football League (NFL). He started in Super Bowl III for the Baltimore Colts. Lyles played college football for the Louisville Cardinals and was selected by the Colts in the first round of the 1958 NFL draft. He was the first player in NFL history to return two kickoffs for over 100 yards in a single season.

== Early life ==
Lenny Lyles was born on January 26, 1936, in Nashville, Tennessee. His family moved to Kentucky when he was three, and he was raised in "Smoke Town" on the east end of Louisville; growing up in a segregated society. He graduated from Louisville's Central Colored High School (Central High School) in 1954, six years before boxing great Cassius Clay (later known as Muhammad Ali) graduated from the same school in 1960.

The school holds a track and field meet named after Lyles. In 1989, he was inducted into the Kentucky High School Athletic Association's Hall of Fame.

== College career ==
Lyles with the San Francisco 49ers in 1960.

Lyles was recruited by coach Frank Camp of the University of Louisville in 1954, when he broke the school's color barrier for scholarship athletes (though Lyles himself has said that the first athlete to break the color barrier at Louisville was Larry Simmons). Coach Camp convinced Lyles to come to Louisville by explaining this would create the opportunity for other black athletes to come and play on the team as well.

Lyles was blessed with sprinters' speed, timed at 9.5 seconds in the 100-yard dash. He was also timed at 9.4 seconds, when the world record holder was Mel Patton at 9.3. Future teammate Johnny Sample, who was a college contemporary of Lyles, said Lyles was faster than anyone else when running in full football gear, including Olympian Bob Hayes. As a freshman, he was 6 ft 1 in (1.85 m), 190 pounds (86.2 kg).

When Lyles was a freshman on Louisville's football team his quarterback was a senior, future Hall of fame great Johnny Unitas; who would also be Lyles's teammate on the Baltimore Colts. Even though a senior, Unitas visited the freshman Lyles's home in Louisville and had meals with his family, and once smuggled Lyles into a segregated drive-in movie.

In 1955, Lyles rushed for 780 yards in 101 attempts, and caught six passes for 163 yards and three touchdowns. He also had four interceptions. His 84 points for the season was a then school record. In a game against Toledo, he had 247 rushing yards and 24 points, both school records at the time (and sixth most as of 2025). Lyles rushed for 1,207 yards in 1957, leading the nation. In a game against Eastern Kentucky, he had 169 yards in only eight carries (21.1 yards per attempt); and in a game against Murray State, Lyles returned a punt 55 yards for a touchdown. The 1957 Cardinals had a 9–1 record, including a victory in the 1958 Sun Bowl (a 34–20 win over Drake University), played in January of that year. He was named a Little All-American in 1957.

Lyles is Louisville's third all-time scoring leader for a non-kicker with 300 points (only behind Malik Cunningham and Lamar Jackson as of 2025). As of 2025, his 2,786 rushing yards is fifth most in school history. His 9.7 yards per rushing attempt in 1957, and 7.7 yards per attempt in 1955, are the top two rushing averages in school history, and his 7.04 career rushing average is first. His 18 touchdowns in 1957 stood as a school record for more than 40 years.

As a track star at Louisville, Lyles set school records in the 100 and 220 yard dashes. Lyles credits Louisville track coach Clark Wood with shaping his life. Louisville hosts the Lenny Lyles Invitational track meet.

He was inducted into the Cardinals Athletics Hall of Fame in 1978. In 2000, a life-size bronze statue of Lyles was unveiled outside of Cardinal Park in Louisville. Louisville has retired his number (26).

== Professional football ==
As a pro, Lyles was 6 ft 2 in (1.88 m), 202 pounds (92 kg). After a successful collegiate career, where Lyles was known for his return skills, and as a running back, he was selected by the Baltimore Colts in the first round of the 1958 NFL draft (11th overall). As a rookie he made his mark with the World Champion Colts as a kickoff returner, racking up touchdown returns of 103 yards against the Chicago Bears and 101 yards against the Washington Redskins. This was the first time in NFL history a player had returned two kickoffs for over 100 yards in a single season. The 1958 sudden death championship game against the New York Giants was the game he most remembered in his career. He returned two kickoffs that day, and made sure he did not fumble.

There were great expectations of Lyles, even as a rookie, and he had trouble relaxing on the Colts. In a regular season game the Colts lost to the Giants 24–21, Lyles had dropped a pass in the endzone. Colts Hall of fame receiver Raymond Berry was the Colts player who made an extra effort to work with Lyles, and was a person who had no manner of racial bias in how he treated people - a rarity in the racially segregated and divisive times in Baltimore, the country, and at times on the team. Lyles played in all 12 Colts games, but he only had 22 rushing attempts and five pass receptions to go along with his 11 returned kickoffs for 398 yards (36.2 yards per return). After just one year with the Colts, on September 18, 1959, Lyles' contract was sold to the San Francisco 49ers ahead of the 1959 season.

He was originally embittered and even wanted revenge against the Colts when he later played against them. Lyles would spend two years in San Francisco, where he led the league in kickoff returns and yardage in 1959, and returned a kickoff 97 yards for a touchdown in 1960. He started two games at halfback in 1959, however, he had even fewer rushing attempts with the 49ers than in his year with the Colts. San Francisco converted him from an offensive halfback to a defensive halfback (cornerback) in 1960.

His contract was once again sold back to the Colts in 1961. Lyles returned to the Colts with a different attitude; more focused, meaner, passionate and without concern as to others opinions of him. He picked a fight in practice with Colts linebacker Bill Pellington, an exceptionally violent and feared player. And he so infuriated the even-tempered Berry with cheap shots in practice, that Berry was ready to fight Lyles. After these antics, and his earlier time in Baltimore, he held some uncertainty on returning to the Colts, but his confidence was boosted by team leader and future hall of famer Gino Marchetti, who told him "'Lyles, the team made a mistake. I’m sure glad you’re back'". For the first time, he genuinely believed the Colts wanted him.

He would no longer return kickoffs after the 1961 season, playing exclusively as a defensive back after that time. He played in all 14 games in 1961, but did not start any. From 1962 through 1968, he started all 85 games in which he played. He was selected to the 1966 Pro Bowl.

He would remain in Baltimore until the end of his career in 1969, starting six of 14 games, highlighted by another NFL Championship in 1968 – although that team would ultimately lose to the AFL Champion New York Jets in Super Bowl III.

Lyles finished his professional career with 2,161 return yards and averaged 26.7 yards per return. He had 16 career interceptions with the Colts.

== Personal life ==
Lyles spent 27 years as an executive with Brown & Williamson in Louisville, ending his work years as a vice president. He was named one of the country's top young business executives by the National Junior Chamber of Commerce. His other business ventures included developing the Lyles Mall in Louisville, and the Lyles Plaza.

In 1994, while in Baltimore to attend and support fundraising for the Ed Block Courage Award Foundation, which aids abused children, Lyles said that "the city of Baltimore and the Colts are a proud part of my past ... No one can tell me there’s a city in the country better than Baltimore."

== Death ==
Lyles died on November 20, 2011.
