= Dez Fitzpatrick =

American football player (born 1997)

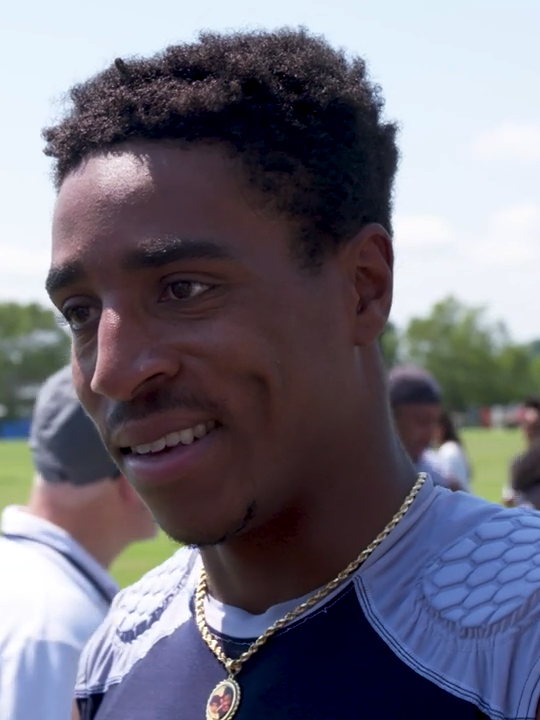
- Fitzpatrick with the Tennessee Titans in 2022

Profile
- Position: Wide receiver

Personal information
- Born: December 17, 1997 (age 28); Pontiac, Michigan, U.S.
- Listed height: 6 ft 2 in (1.88 m)
- Listed weight: 208 lb (94 kg)

Career information
- High school: Mott (Waterford, Michigan)
- College: Louisville (2016–2020)
- NFL draft: 2021: 4th round, 109th overall pick

Career history
- Tennessee Titans (2021–2022); Pittsburgh Steelers (2023–2024); Los Angeles Chargers (2024)*
- * Offseason or practice squad member only

Career NFL statistics
- Receptions: 5
- Receiving yards: 49
- Receiving touchdowns: 1
- Stats at Pro Football Reference

Desmond Emil Fitzpatrick (born December 17, 1997) is an American professional football wide receiver. He played college football for the Louisville Cardinals.

== Professional career ==
Pre-draft measurables
Height	Weight	Arm length	Hand span	40-yard dash	10-yard split	20-yard split	20-yard shuttle	Three-cone drill	Vertical jump
6 ft 1 3/4 in (1.87 m)	208 lb (94 kg)	32 3/4 in (0.83 m)	9 5/8 in (0.24 m)	4.47 s	1.54 s	2.58 s	4.25 s	7.06 s	35.0 in (0.89 m)
All values from Pro Day

=== Tennessee Titans ===
Fitzpatrick was selected by the Tennessee Titans in the fourth round with the 109th overall pick in the 2021 NFL draft. On May 17, 2021, he signed his four-year rookie contract with the team. On August 31, Fitzpatrick was waived by the Titans as part of final roster cuts and re-signed to the practice squad the following day. On November 13, Fitzpatrick was signed to the active roster following Julio Jones being placed on injured reserve. On November 23, Fitzpatrick scored his first career touchdown against the Houston Texans on an 18-yard reception from Ryan Tannehill.

On August 30, 2022, Fitzpatrick was waived by the Titans as part of final roster cuts and re-signed to the practice squad the following day. His practice squad contract with the team expired after the season on January 7, 2023.

=== Pittsburgh Steelers ===
On January 11, 2023, Fitzpatrick signed a reserve/future contract with the Pittsburgh Steelers. On August 29, he was released by the Steelers and re-signed to the practice squad the following day. Fitzpatrick was promoted to the active roster on September 14, released on October 2 and re-signed to the practice squad two days later. He signed a reserve/futures contract on January 17, 2024.

On August 27, 2024, Fitzpatrick was waived by the Steelers as part of final roster cuts.

=== Los Angeles Chargers ===
On September 2, 2024, Fitzpatrick was signed to the Los Angeles Chargers' practice squad. On December 5, he was released and Laviska Shenault Jr. was signed in his place. On December 10, the Chargers re–signed Fitzpatrick to their practice squad.

On January 13, 2025, Fitzpatrick signed a reserve/future contract with Los Angeles. On August 14, Fitzpatrick was waived by the Chargers with an injury designation.
