= J. R. Russell =

American football player (born 1981)

No. 87
- Position: Wide receiver

Personal information
- Born: December 5, 1981 (age 44); Tampa, Florida, U.S.
- Listed height: 6 ft 3 in (1.91 m)
- Listed weight: 204 lb (93 kg)

Career information
- High school: Gaither (Tampa)
- College: Louisville
- NFL draft: 2005: 7th round, 253rd overall pick

Career history
- Tampa Bay Buccaneers (2005); Orlando Predators (2007)

Career AFL statistics
- Receptions: 16
- Receiving yards: 174
- Receiving touchdowns: 2
- Stats at ArenaFan.com

J. R. Russell (born December 5, 1981) is an American former professional football wide receiver. He was selected by the Tampa Bay Buccaneers in the seventh round of the 2005 NFL draft. He played College football at the University of Louisville.

== College career ==
During Russell's four years at the University of Louisville, he played in 50 games where he caught 186 passes for 2,619 receiving yards and 19 touchdowns. His best season was in 2003, where he played in 13 games, catching 75 passes for 1,213 yards and 8 touchdowns.

=== College statistics ===
Season	GP	Receiving				Rushing			
Season	GP	Rec	Yds	Avg	TD	Att	Yds	Avg	TD
2001	12	14	151	10.8	2	0	0	0	0
2002	13	24	287	12.0	2	0	0	0	0
2003	13	75	1,213	16.2	8	0	0	0	0
2004	12	73	968	13.3	7	0	0	0	0
Career	50	186	2,619	14.1	19	0	0	0	0

== Professional career ==
=== Tampa Bay Buccaneers ===
Russell was selected by the Tampa Bay Buccaneers in the seventh round with the 253rd pick in the 2005 NFL draft.

Russell made the Buccaneers opening day roster, but never played in a game. He was released on November 19, 2005, and was re-signed to the Bucs' practice squad the next day.

Russell was released on August 29, 2006, after Training Camp.

=== Orlando Predators ===
Russell signed with the Orlando Predators on April 12, 2007.

== Personal life ==
Currently resides in Tampa with his 3 children and wife Theresa.

Russell goes by the nickname "Sneed." He was given this nickname by a family friend when he was younger.
