= Michael Bush =

American football player (born 1984)

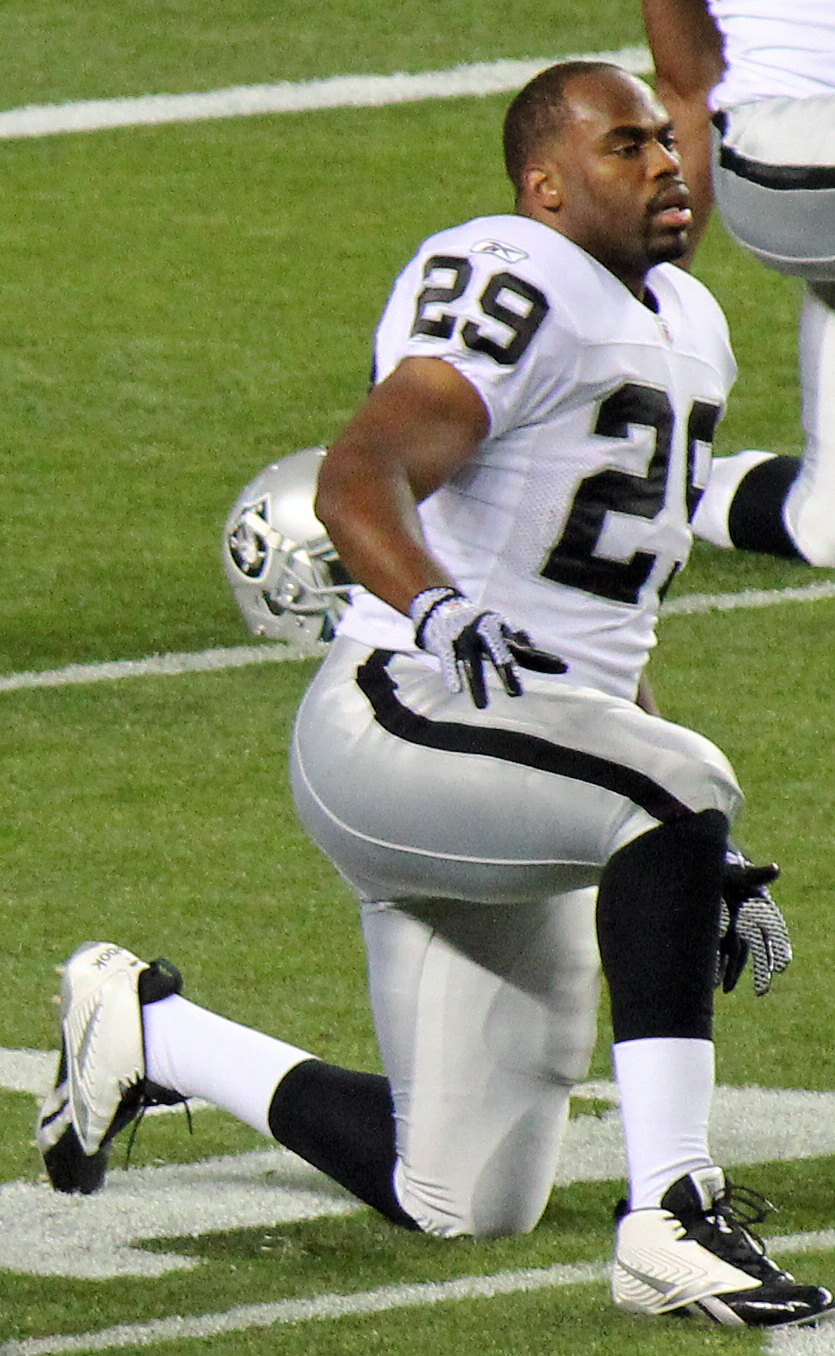
- Bush with the Oakland Raiders in 2011

No. 29
- Position: Running back

Personal information
- Born: June 16, 1984 (age 42); Louisville, Kentucky, U.S.
- Listed height: 6 ft 1 in (1.85 m)
- Listed weight: 245 lb (111 kg)

Career information
- High school: Louisville Male (Louisville, Kentucky)
- College: Louisville (2003–2006)
- NFL draft: 2007: 4th round, 100th overall pick

Career history
- Oakland Raiders (2007–2011); Chicago Bears (2012–2013); Arizona Cardinals (2014)

Career NFL statistics
- Rushing attempts: 809
- Rushing yards: 3,250
- Rushing touchdowns: 29
- Receptions: 104
- Receiving yards: 1,010
- Receiving touchdowns: 2
- Stats at Pro Football Reference

Michael Warren Bush Jr. (born June 16, 1984) is an American former professional football player who was a running back in the National Football League (NFL). He was selected by the Oakland Raiders in the fourth round of the 2007 NFL draft. He played college football for the Louisville Cardinals.

In addition to the Raiders, Bush played for the Chicago Bears and Arizona Cardinals.

== Early life ==
Bush attended Louisville Male High School where he played quarterback his senior year after seeing action at defensive back, defensive end, linebacker, running back, safety, and wide receiver over his career. As a senior, he led the Bulldogs to the state championship game in Kentucky's highest class. In that showdown against future Louisville teammate Brian Brohm and the Trinity High School Shamrocks, Bush threw for 468 yards and six touchdowns and ran for 116 yards and another touchdown in a 59–56 loss. He also caught two passes for 24 yards, returned a punt and a kickoff, and made five tackles on defense.

== College career ==
Following a successful high school career, Bush became a highly sought after college recruit. He turned down offers from several more established programs (including Ohio State) to stay at home and attend the University of Louisville, largely because head coach Bobby Petrino promised the opportunity to play quarterback, his preferred position. As a true freshman, he was forced to play several positions in order to get on the field because Louisville's starting quarterback position was locked down by Stefan LeFors. Though he was not the starter, Bush was able to rush for 100 yards in back-to-back games as a running back toward the end of the year against Houston and Cincinnati.

Meanwhile, Petrino had decided to recruit another star quarterback from the Louisville area: Brian Brohm of Trinity. Though Bush had played various positions his freshman year, he believed this arrangement to be temporary and still expected to be a quarterback in the long-term. The recruitment of Brohm, however, meant Bush would have to find another position. Much to Bush's chagrin, Petrino moved him to the running back position permanently.

In 2004, as a sophomore, Bush backed up Lionel Gates and Eric Shelton. He rushed for 734 yards and seven touchdowns and proved himself worthy of the starting role for next season.

Bush's breakout season came as a junior in 2005, as he rushed for 1,143 yards on 205 carries, averaging 5.6 yards per carry, racked up a Big East-leading 23 rushing touchdowns, and was second in NCAA Division I-A in scoring to LenDale White. He was also widely considered to be a preseason candidate for the 2006 Heisman Trophy. Though he could have left early for the NFL draft, Bush decided to return for his senior season.

He came into the 2006 projected as one of the top 10 players for the 2007 NFL draft, and his season began successfully as expected. His first carry of the season was a 48-yard run for a touchdown in the Cardinals' annual rivalry game with Kentucky. He then scored two more touchdowns in the first half, and had carried for 128 yards when he was tackled by Kentucky linebacker Wesley Woodyard during a routine rushing play in the third quarter and suffered a broken right tibia. The injury was so bad that ESPN announced before the end of the game that Bush would miss the remainder of the 2006 season. The injury required the insertion of a steel rod and a second operation to facilitate the healing process.

Bush participated in 3 bowl games during his career as a Cardinal. The first was a GMAC Bowl loss to Miami University in which Bush ran for 33 yards on 9 attempts, behind Gates' 12 carries for 128 yards. Bush fared better in the Liberty Bowl victory over Boise State with 12 carries for 96 yards, his best performance in a bowl game. Bush finished his bowl career in the Gator Bowl with 94 yards on 16 carries against Virginia Tech.

Bush majored in sports administration at Louisville.

== Professional career ==
Pre-draft measurables
Height	Weight	Arm length	Hand span
6 ft 1 3/8 in (1.86 m)	243 lb (110 kg)	33 1/2 in (0.85 m)	9 1/2 in (0.24 m)
All values from NFL Combine

=== Oakland Raiders ===
Bush was chosen by the Oakland Raiders in the 2007 NFL draft in the fourth round with the 100th overall pick. With his broken leg still hobbling him, he was declared Physically Unable to Perform for the entire 2007 season.

After a two-year hiatus, Bush finally returned to the football field in 2008. He was the Raiders' third string halfback but saw some action because of injuries to Darren McFadden and Justin Fargas. He made his NFL debut in Week 1. He got his first significant action in Week 2 against the Kansas City Chiefs with 16 carriers for 90 yards in the 23–8 victory. He was used in a limited role following Week 4 up until the regular season finale in Week 17 against the Tampa Bay Buccaneers. In the win, Bush rushed for 177 yards on 27 carries and two touchdowns to help Oakland deny Tampa Bay a spot in the playoffs.

In the 2009 season, Bush saw more usage but continued to platoon the backfield with Fargas and McFadden. He appeared in all 16 games, started seven, and finished with 123 carries for 589 rushing yards and three rushing touchdowns.

In 2010, Bush solidified a role as the team's second running back, only behind McFadden. He rushed for 655 yards in 14 games, including eight touchdowns.

Before the 2011 season, Bush agreed to a contract extension with the Raiders. In Week 10, he started as running back against the San Diego Chargers in place of the injured McFadden. In that 24–17 victory, he gained a total of 242 yards from scrimmage, fourth most in Raiders history and eclipsing Bo Jackson's total for the most since the AFL/NFL merger. Bush finished with 256 carries for 977 yards and seven rushing touchdowns to finish as the team's leading rusher. He carved out a role catching passes in the offense with 37 receptions for 418 receiving yards and a receiving touchdown.

=== Chicago Bears ===
Bush signed a four-year contract worth $14 million (with $7 million guaranteed) with the Chicago Bears on March 22, 2012. Bush replaced Matt Forte as halfback during minicamp while Forte was holding out over a contract dispute. In his regular season debut as a Bear in 2012, Bush ran for 42 yards and two touchdowns as the Bears defeated the Indianapolis Colts 41–21. After sustaining a rib injury, Bush was placed on injured reserve on December 18. Bush was also unofficially considered the emergency quarterback of the Bears, something which is related to his experience from high school. On March 10, 2014, the Bears released Bush.

=== Arizona Cardinals ===
Bush signed with the Arizona Cardinals on November 25, 2014. He was released by the team on December 5, 2014.

=== 2015 NFL Veteran Combine ===
In 2015, Bush participated in the first NFL Veteran Combine, where he recorded a 40-yard dash time of 4.91 seconds. Upon hearing the news, the former running back exclaimed: "You gotta be (expletive) me... 4.91? ... There you go, there goes my career."

== Career statistics ==
=== NFL ===
Rushing statistics

Year	Team	GP	Att	Yds	Avg	Lng	TD	FD	Fum	Lost
2008	OAK	15	95	421	4.4	67	3	15	1	1
2009	OAK	16	123	589	4.8	60	3	22	1	1
2010	OAK	14	158	655	4.1	30	8	32	0	0
2011	OAK	16	256	977	3.8	44	7	53	1	1
2012	CHI	13	114	411	3.6	20	5	28	1	1
2013	CHI	15	63	197	3.1	40	3	10	0	0
Total		89	809	3,250	4.0	67	29	160	4	4

Receiving statistics

Year	Team	GP	Rec	Tgt	Yds	Avg	Lng	TD	FD	Fum	Lost
2008	OAK	15	19	30	162	8.5	25	0	7	0	0
2009	OAK	16	17	19	105	6.2	17	0	3	1	1
2010	OAK	14	18	24	194	10.8	55	0	11	0	0
2011	OAK	16	37	47	418	11.3	55	1	14	0	0
2012	CHI	13	9	11	83	9.2	18	0	6	0	0
2013	CHI	15	4	7	48	12.0	17	1	2	0	0
Total		89	104	138	1,010	9.7	55	2	43	1	1

=== College ===
Year	G	Att	Yrd	TD	Lng	Avg
2003	13	81	503	6	81	6.2
2004	12	132	734	7	31	5.6
2005	10	205	1,143	23	73	5.6
2006	1	17	128	3	51	7.5
Total	36	435	2,508	39	81	5.8

== Personal life ==
Bush's wife Emily, an Australian, is the half-sister of National Basketball Association player Ben Simmons.
