= Brian Brohm =

American football player and coach (born 1985)

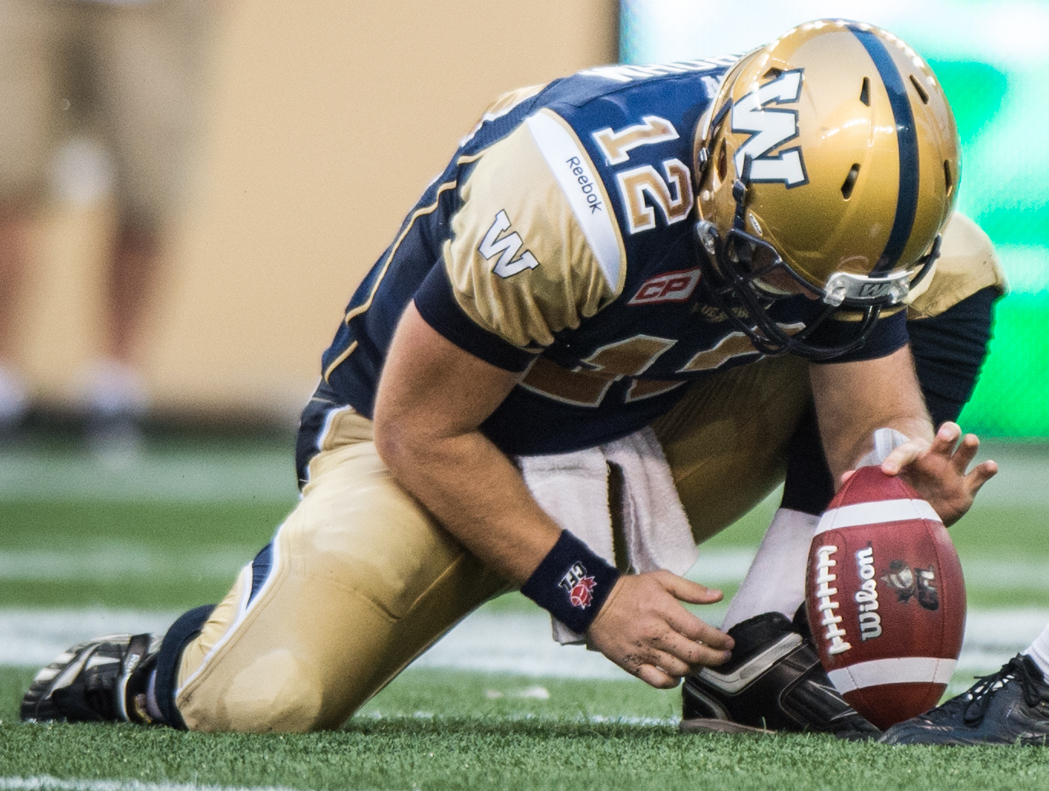
- Brohm with the Winnipeg Blue Bombers in 2015

Louisville Cardinals
- Title: Offensive coordinator, quarterbacks coach

Personal information
- Born: September 23, 1985 (age 41); Louisville, Kentucky, U.S.
- Listed height: 6 ft 3 in (1.91 m)
- Listed weight: 232 lb (105 kg)

Career information
- High school: Trinity (Louisville)
- College: Louisville (2004–2007)
- NFL draft: 2008: 2nd round, 56th overall pick

Career history

Playing
- Green Bay Packers (2008–2009); Buffalo Bills (2009–2010); Las Vegas Locomotives (2011–2012); Hamilton Tiger-Cats (2013); Winnipeg Blue Bombers (2014–2015)

Coaching
- Western Kentucky (2016) Co-offensive coordinator & quarterbacks coach; Purdue (2017–2022) Offensive coordinator & quarterbacks coach; Purdue (2022) Interim head coach; Louisville (2023–present) Offensive coordinator & quarterbacks coach

Awards and highlights
- Big East Offensive Player of The Year (2005); Conference USA Freshman of the Year (2005); Orange Bowl MVP (2007)

Career NFL statistics
- Passing attempts: 52
- Passing completions: 27
- Completion percentage: 51.9%
- TD–INT: 0–5
- Passing yards: 252
- Passer rating: 26
- Stats at Pro Football Reference

Career CFL statistics
- TD–INT: 1–5
- Passing yards: 907
- Passer rating: 61.8
- Stats at CFL.ca

Head coaching record
- Career: 0–1

Brian Joseph Brohm (born September 23, 1985) is an American football coach and former quarterback who is the offensive coordinator and quarterbacks coach at the University of Louisville. He played professionally in the National Football League (NFL) and Canadian Football League (CFL).

Brohm played college football for Louisville and was selected by the Green Bay Packers in the second round of the 2008 NFL draft. He also played in the NFL for the Buffalo Bills and the CFL's Hamilton Tiger-Cats and Winnipeg Blue Bombers, as well as the Las Vegas Locomotives of the United Football League

== Early life ==
While passing for 10,579 yards and 119 touchdowns during his prep career, Brohm led the Trinity Shamrocks to the 4-A state title in 2001, 2002, and 2003. He was the MVP of all three title games, the most exciting of which was a 59–56 victory over Louisville Male High School and 2002 Mr. Football Michael Bush. Brohm threw for 552 yards and 7 TDs in that game. Brian was featured on the cover of Sports Illustrated on November 18, 2002, while he was a junior in high school.

Brohm was named 2003 Kentucky Mr. Football, USA Today Offensive Player of the Year and was the Kentucky Gatorade Player of the Year for 2003. Brohm was named one of the top five quarterbacks in America by Rivals.com and was selected to participate in the 2004 U.S. Army All-American Bowl game in San Antonio, Texas.

Brohm played basketball and baseball for the Shamrocks, helping the basketball team to its first ever Regional title and the baseball team to a state runner-up finish. He was the MVP of the only State tournament victory in Trinity history, when they defeated University Heights Academy in 2004. Brohm was also voted the MVP of his baseball team his senior year. Following his senior year he was drafted by the Colorado Rockies in the 49th round of the 2004 MLB draft.

== College career ==
=== 2004 season ===
Brohm announced his decision to attend the University of Louisville on January 20, 2004, picking the hometown Cardinals over scholarship offers from Notre Dame, Tennessee and Alabama, among others. Brohm enrolled at Louisville in the fall of 2004 and immediately began competing for the starting quarterback spot with Stefan LeFors.

In his first season, Brohm was named Conference USA Freshman of the Year, despite not starting a single game, but he helped lead the Cardinals to the 2004 Liberty Bowl against Boise State and a #6 ranking to end the season. Brohm completed 66 of 98 passes for 819 yards and six touchdowns. After entering the game for at least one series per game as a true freshman, Brohm followed in the footsteps of father, Oscar, and brother, Jeff, by becoming a starting quarterback at the University of Louisville in 2005. His brother, Greg, also played at Louisville as a receiver.

=== 2005 season ===
In 2005, Brohm passed for 2,883 yards and 19 touchdowns before sustaining a season-ending knee injury in a game against Syracuse on November 25. He was forced to miss Louisville's last regular season game (a December 2 matchup against (Connecticut) and was still in rehabilitation when the Cardinals lost to Virginia Tech in the 2006 Gator Bowl. Brohm was named the Big East Offensive Player of the Year and 1st Team All-Big East Quarterback in 2005.

=== 2006 season ===
Brohm injured his thumb in Louisville's September 16, 2006, victory over Miami. He returned as starting quarterback in Louisville's October 14, 2006, victory against Cincinnati. He had been replaced at starting quarterback by sophomore backup Hunter Cantwell for the previous two games. Before his injury, Brohm was one of two candidates at U of L for the 2006 Heisman Trophy, along with senior running back Michael Bush. The pair, both born and raised in Louisville, were dubbed "The Derby City Duo."

In the 2007 Orange Bowl, Brohm earned MVP honors by leading Louisville to its first-ever BCS victory, 24–13 over Wake Forest. Brohm completed 24 of 34 passes for 311 yards, the third highest total in Orange Bowl history. He also ended the year as the 2nd Team All Big East Quarterback behind Pat White. The Sporting News projected Brohm as high as the top pick in the 2007 NFL draft, and many other experts had projected him as going no later than the first round, Brohm announced on January 15, 2007, after a long period of speculation, that he would return to the University of Louisville for his senior year.

After the 2007 Orange Bowl, Brohm stated that "Right now, coming back and trying to win a national title looks very appealing." Rivals.com named Brohm as one of the top 10 quarterbacks going into the 2007 season.

=== 2007 season ===
Brohm had an injury-free season in 2007, completing 308-of-473 passes for 4,024 yards for 30 touchdowns with 12 interceptions, giving him a quarterback rating of 152. However, Louisville struggled and finished 6–6, failing to make a bowl game for the first time in 10 years. Brohm again was the Second-team All Big East quarterback behind Pat White.

== Professional career ==
Pre-draft measurables
Height	Weight	Arm length	Hand span	40-yard dash	10-yard split	20-yard split	20-yard shuttle	Three-cone drill	Vertical jump	Broad jump	Wonderlic
6 ft 2 7/8 in (1.90 m)	230 lb (104 kg)	30 in (0.76 m)	9 3/4 in (0.25 m)	4.69 s	1.56 s	2.66 s	4.41 s	7.13 s	30.0 in (0.76 m)	9 ft 7 in (2.92 m)	32
All values from NFL Combine/Pro Day

The fact that the 2008 draft was infused with top-prospect quarterbacks whose playing styles are very similar to Brohm's was also a key argument for Brohm's possible entry in the 2007 draft, where the other first round-bound quarterbacks include the more diverse characters of Brady Quinn and JaMarcus Russell. However, Brohm eventually decided to return for his senior season for another shot at helping the Louisville Cardinals to a BCS National Championship. Instead, the team went 6–6.

=== Green Bay Packers ===
Brohm was drafted by the Green Bay Packers in the second round (56th overall) of the 2008 NFL draft. On July 27, 2008, he signed a contract with the Packers. As a rookie, he was the third quarterback on the depth chart behind starter Aaron Rodgers and backup Matt Flynn, who was drafted by the Packers in the seventh round of the same draft. He was waived on September 5, 2009. Just days later, Brohm was signed to the practice squad.

=== Buffalo Bills ===
Brohm was signed off the Packers practice squad by the Buffalo Bills on November 19, 2009, after the Bills waived Gibran Hamdan. He made his first NFL start on December 27, 2009, against the Atlanta Falcons. Buffalo lost the game 31–3. In the 2nd quarter of the same game, Brohm threw an 8-yard pass to wide receiver Terrell Owens, giving the wideout his 1,000th career reception.

Brohm competed with Ryan Fitzpatrick and Trent Edwards for the starting quarterback position prior to the 2010 season. Edwards, however, was named starter prior to the first preseason game, with Fitzpatrick and Brohm alternating as second-string through the preseason. By the start of the regular season, Brohm had been demoted back to third string; when Edwards was released, he was moved back up to second string when Fitzpatrick became the starter. Brohm was given the start in the final game of the season, a 38–7 loss to the New York Jets. Brohm, a restricted free agent, was not re-signed by the Bills in the 2011 offseason, with the Bills having signed Brad Smith and Tyler Thigpen as backups to Fitzpatrick.

=== Las Vegas Locomotives ===
Brohm signed with the Las Vegas Locomotives of the United Football League on August 29, 2011. Brohm, entering the game in relief of starter Chase Clement, saw his first action in a game against the Virginia Destroyers on September 24, 2011, completing 10-19 passes for 111 yds and 2 touchdowns in a 34–17 loss.

Following the 2011 season, Brohm had a workout for the Detroit Lions in November. In March 2012, he threw to Randy Moss in a highly publicized workout for the New Orleans Saints. Thereafter, he was part of a massive tryout held by the San Francisco 49ers toward the end of March. Continuing with a busy 2012 off-season, Brohm was invited to attend the New Orleans Saints rookie mini-camp on a tryout basis.

Brohm returned to the Locomotives for the 2012 season, serving again as Clement's backup. He saw action beginning in the Week 3 game against the Sacramento Mountain Lions after an injury to Clement; his first play was an 80-yard touchdown pass. Brohm was among the 78 players from both the Locomotives and Omaha Nighthawks who filed a class-action lawsuit against UFL majority owner Bill Hambrecht for unpaid salary after the 2012 season was cut short.

=== Hamilton Tiger-Cats ===
On April 16, 2013, Brohm agreed to terms with the Hamilton Tiger-Cats of the Canadian Football League. Brohm spent the 2013 CFL season on the injured list; seeing no playing time during the regular season or playoffs.

=== Winnipeg Blue Bombers ===
On March 3, 2014, Brohm was traded to the Winnipeg Blue Bombers of the CFL in exchange for a conditional draft pick in the 2015 CFL draft. Brohm played in 4 games during the 2014 season, starting in 1 game and receiving significant playing in the other 2 games. He completed 39 of 70 passes (55.7%) for 454 yards with 0 touchdowns and 1 interception (passer rating of 69.6). Following the 2014 CFL season Brohm and the Bombers initially did not come to terms on a new contract; resulting in Brohm becoming a free-agent on February 10, 2015. Seven days later both parties agreed to a new 2-year contract. He was released by the team on January 6, 2016.

== Career statistics ==
=== Professional ===
Year	League	Team	Games		Passing							
Year	League	Team	GP	GS	Cmp	Att	Pct	Yds	Avg	TD	Int	Rtg
2008	NFL	GB	0	0	DNP							
2009	NFL	BUF	2	1	17	29	58.6	146	5.0	0	2	43.2
2010	NFL	BUF	1	1	10	23	43.5	106	4.6	0	3	17.9
2011	UFL	LV	1	0	10	19	52.6	111	5.8	2	0	105.4
2012	UFL	LV	2	0	13	18	72.2	177	9.8	1	0	121.8
2013	CFL	HAM	0	0	DNP							
2014	CFL	WIN	4	1	39	70	55.7	454	6.5	0	1	69.9
2015	CFL	WIN	7	1	51	84	60.7	453	5.4	1	4	55.3

=== College ===
Year	Team	Games			Passing									Rushing			
Year	Team	GP	GS	Record	Cmp	Att	Yds	Pct	TD	Int	Avg	Lng	Rtg	Att	Yds	Avg	TD
2004	Louisville	11	0	—	66	98	819	67.3	6	2	8.4	74	153.7	27	81	3.0	2
2005	Louisville	10	10	8–2	207	301	2,883	68.8	19	5	9.6	76	166.7	41	-36	-0.9	4
2006	Louisville	10	10	10–1	199	313	3,049	63.6	16	5	9.7	75	159.1	47	45	1.0	0
2007	Louisville	12	12	6–6	308	473	4,024	65.1	30	12	8.5	81	152.4	57	-46	-0.8	3
Totals		43	32	24–9	780	1,185	10,775	65.8	71	24	9.1	81	157.9	172	44	0.3	9

== Coaching career ==
=== Western Kentucky ===
In February 2016, Brohm was named quarterbacks coach at Western Kentucky. He reunited with his brothers, Greg and Jeff Brohm, the latter of whom was the head football coach.

=== Purdue ===
After his brother Jeff accepted the head coaching job at Purdue on December 5, 2016, it was rumored that Brohm would be joining Purdue as the co-offensive coordinator/quarterbacks coach. On January 2, 2017, Brian was officially hired at Purdue as an assistant coach. For the 2020 season opener against Iowa, Brohm took over as acting head coach and play-caller after Jeff tested positive for COVID-19, a game that Purdue won 24–20. When Jeff left to become the head football coach at Louisville, Brian was named the interim head coach for Purdue for the 2023 Citrus Bowl.

=== Head coaching record ===
Year	Team	Overall	Conference	Standing	Bowl/playoffs
Purdue Boilermakers (Big Ten Conference) (2022)
2022	Purdue	0–1	0–0		L Citrus
Purdue:		0–1	0–0		
Total:		0–1			

== Personal life ==
Brohm married his wife in 2014. The couple has two children.

Brohm is the younger brother of former University of Louisville and NFL quarterback Jeff Brohm, who is currently the head coach of the University of Louisville. Another brother, Greg, played wide receiver at Louisville.
