= University of Louisville Cardinal Marching Band =

College marching band in Louisville, Kentucky

UofL Cardinal Marching Band
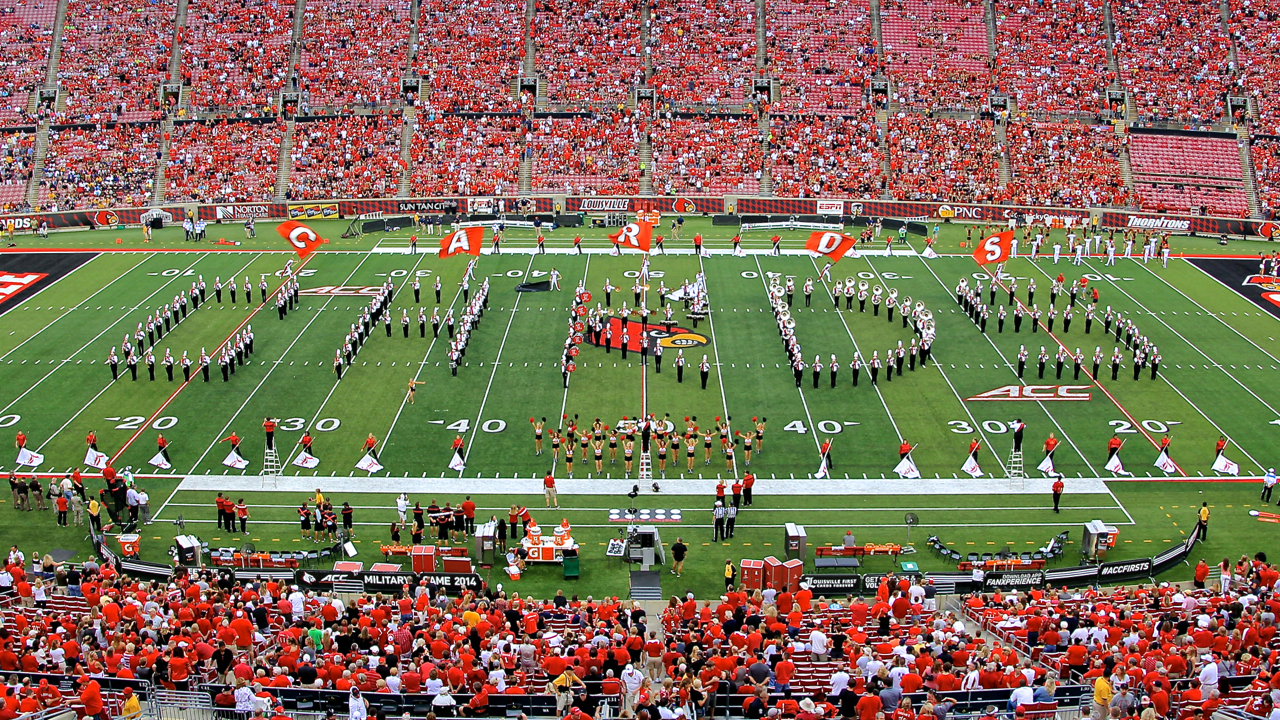
- UofL Cardinal Marching Band
- School: University of Louisville
- Location: Louisville, Kentucky
- Conference: ACC
- Founded: 1928
- Director: Dr. Jason Cumberledge
- Assistant Director: Dr. Jason Freeman
- Members: 220
- Fight song: "Fight! U of L / All Hail, U of L"
- Website: uoflbands.com

The University of Louisville Cardinal Marching Band is the official marching band of the University of Louisville (UofL) in Louisville, Kentucky. It is considered a Music Ambassador for UofL. The CMB performs at all home football games at Cardinal Stadium, all postseason bowl games, and select away football games. It also plays at the annual Spring Scrimmage Game which pits the Cardinal Offense against the Cardinal Defense.

The CMB is composed of students at the University of Louisville and surrounding Kentuckiana Metroversity institutions. Every member of the CMB receives a scholarship to perform with the ensemble. There are additional awards for the official CMB Bugler and Feature Twirler. The Cardinal Marching Band is a Major Ensemble course at the UofL School of Music. The Cardinal Marching Band is also the Official Band of the Kentucky Derby, held on the first Saturday in May each year.

== Overview ==
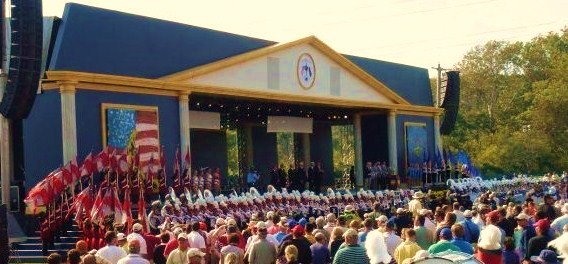
UofL Band at the 2008 Ryder Cup

During the university's Fall semester, the band rehearses from 4:30pm to 6:30pm on Mondays, Wednesdays, and Fridays. Membership includes the brass and woodwinds, drumline, the feature twirler, colorguard, and drum majors. It is composed of students at the university (music majors and non-music majors alike) as well as select students of other Metroversity colleges that don't have a marching band program of their own. Members receive both a college credit and a scholarship for participation. The band has performed on MTV and has had musical greats join them in performance such as world-renowned trumpeter, Wynton Marsalis. The group was chosen to perform for the Captain's Celebration of the 2008 Ryder Cup at the Valhalla Golf Club. The group has also been featured and/or written about on ESPN, FOX Sports, Good Morning America, ABC World News Tonight with Charlie Gibson, Inside Edition, and ABC's Extreme Makeover: Home Edition.

== History ==
For over 90 years the Cardinal Marching Band has represented the University of Louisville as the most visible ensemble of the School of Music, performing live for over half a million spectators each year. Creating game day traditions for Cardinal fans is at the core of the CMB, which performs at all home football games, select away games, and all bowl games.

The Cardinal Marching Band has been the "Official Band of the Kentucky Derby" since 1936 and has received national recognition through features on ESPN, ABC World News Tonight, Oprah, Sports Illustrated, Extreme Makeover: Home Edition, and the NFL Network. Additionally, the CMB has performed at over 20 bowl locations including the Russell Athletic, Sugar, Orange, Liberty, Belk, Beef O'Bradys, Boca Raton, Fenway, Gator, GMAC, Humanitarian, Motor City, Fiesta, Pasadena, and Sun Bowls.

The Cardinal Marching Band was formed in 1928 under the direction of E. J. Wotowa (composer "Hail Purdue!") and started performing at football games in 1933. In 1949, the band traveled to Hattiesburg, Mississippi to perform at the UofL vs. Southern Mississippi football game. It was at this game that the band had to abandon the claim of "Best Dressed Band in Dixie," after it was discovered another band held prior claim to that title. The UofL CMB then adopted the nickname "Marching Cardinals" which was shortened in 2011 to "Marching Cards."

Through the 1950s the CMB was very active, performing halftime shows featuring notable majorette Hilda Gay Mayberry. In the 1960s, the CMB was led by Robert B. Griffith, who wrote the fight song, Fight! UofL.

The band's membership gradually declined in the 1960s until their last performance in the fall of 1970. In 1978 Governor Julian Carroll offered to reestablish the Cardinal Marching Band. Since then, the band has grown to be an established part of UofL's school culture. The band has performed at every UofL Football game since 1979 and has been a vital part of the University of Louisville.

In 2023, Jason Cumberledge was appointed as Director of Athletic Bands and Cardinal Marching Band Director. Jason Freeman assumed the role of Assistant Director in 2025. These terms were preceded by Amy Acklin's 12-year tenure as director of the band. Frederick Speck, Director of Bands, has overseen and provided vision for the program since 1995. Speck also wrote the arrangement of At the Post which the band plays during the pre-game show.

Every member of the CMB receives a scholarship to perform with the ensemble. There are additional scholarships for the official CMB Bugler and Feature Twirler.

== Instruments and sections ==
- Drum Majors
- Twirlers
- Colorguard
- Flutes / Piccolos
- Clarinets
- Alto and Tenor Saxophones
- Trumpets
- Mellophones
- Trombones
- Baritones
- Sousaphones
- Drumline (Includes Snare line, Tenor line, Bass line, and Cymbal line)
- Front ensemble

== Traditions ==
- The chanting and playing of the "CARDS" cheer to end every rehearsal. (refer to Track 12 of the band's 2007 Highlights CD, listed below)
- The playing of "Cardinal Circle," written by head director of bands, Dr. Fredrick Speck at the beginning of every Monday rehearsal.
- The President's Tailgate -- About 45 minutes before a home football game, the band marches to the school president's tailgate area where many important guests to the school congregate before each game. While there, the band plays few school songs for the enjoyment of those in attendance.
- Call to the Post -- During each pregame show, a solo trumpeter plays Call to the Post into a microphone to be heard throughout the stadium. This is a reference to the city of Louisville's long history with horse racing as the Call to the Post tune is customarily played by a bugler just minutes before a horse race. There is usually a second playing of this, occurring just before the start of the second half of the football game by the same trumpeter that played it during pregame.
- Card March - About 2 hours before every home game, the drumline leads the football team to the stadium gates where the band and colorguard await ready to play a string of school songs.
- The annual Cardinal Marching Band Banquet near the end of the football season in order to celebrate the journey from band camp to the end of the regular season. The banquet includes recognition of all Senior members who are presented a gift, and a slideshow of the year's performances.

== Performances ==
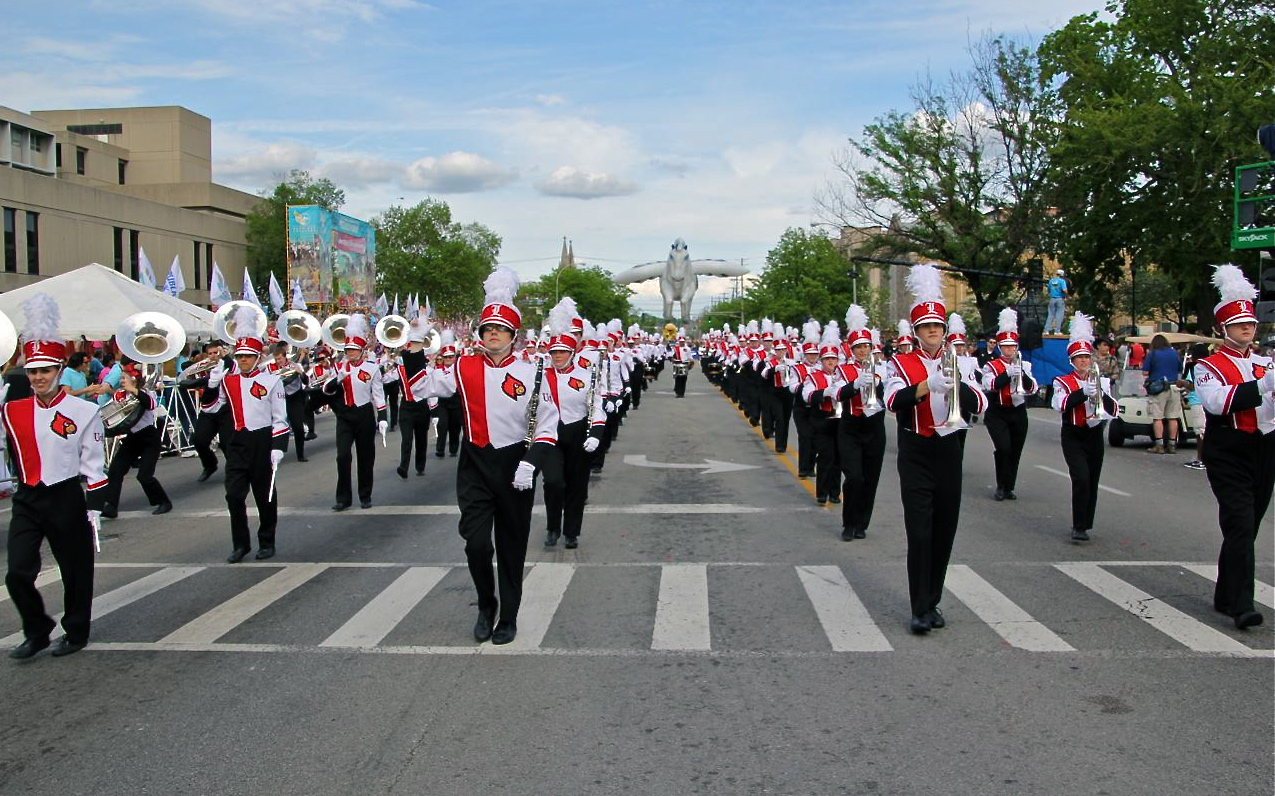
2013 Cardinal Marching Band - Opening Act for the Kentucky Derby Festival Pegasus Parade on Broadway in Louisville

=== Kentucky Derby Festival ===
==== Pegasus Parade ====
During the Kentucky Derby Festival, the band has two events that it participates in annually. The first of which is the Pegasus Parade, held in downtown Louisville two days before the Kentucky Derby. It is one of the largest parades in the United States. The band marches the parade among all the other floats and attractions while playing fight songs, both representing the University of Louisville and the city of Louisville itself.

==== Kentucky Derby ====
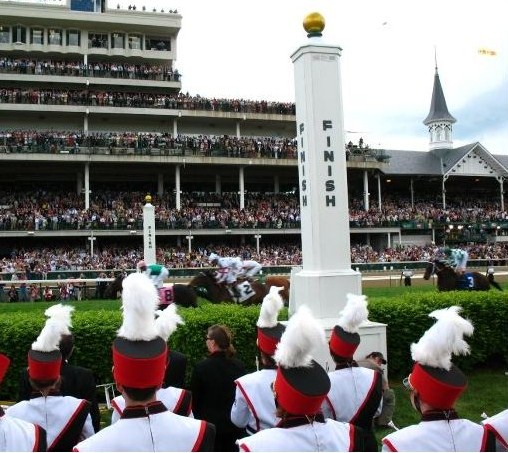
UofL Band at the Churchill Downs, pictured near the finish line

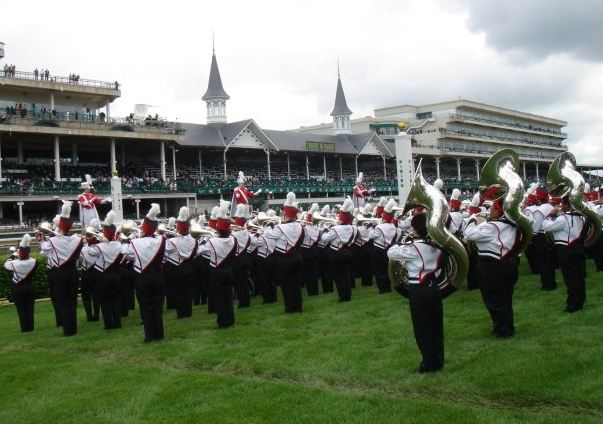
UofL Band playing at the Kentucky Derby

The second of these events is the Kentucky Derby itself at historic Churchill Downs. The band routinely plays in between the various races held on Derby day, usually alternating play times with a military band. Its greatest honor every year takes place minutes before the big race—the playing of the Stephen Foster classic "My Old Kentucky Home" near the Derby Winner's Circle for all those in attendance and for those that watch on television. The band first played the song at the Derby in 1936, by which time it was established as the music played while the horses are led to the post parade. It has kept this engagement for all but a few years since then. In 2002, famed trumpeter Wynton Marsalis joined the band for this honor. In 1998, Frederick A. Speck (the UofL director of bands and a composer in his own right) wrote an arrangement of My Old Kentucky Home that the marching band has since played for this and many other occasions.

=== The Louisville Orchestra ===
In the past, the UofL Marching Band carried a relationship with the Louisville Orchestra. The first concert of the Orchestra's season was called Fanfara—held at The Kentucky Center for the Performing Arts in September every year. The marching band was featured as the opening act, usually entering and exiting to a drum cadence but stopping to play The Star-Spangled Banner while on stage. The playing of the American national anthem appropriately kicked off the Orchestra's season of wonderful live music.

=== KMEA State Marching Championships ===
Since 2007, when the competition returned to Louisville after a long drought without it, band members have assisted the Kentucky Music Educators Association (KMEA) in hosting the semi-finals and finals of Kentucky State Marching Band Championships at Cardinal Stadium. Band members take on various jobs for the day, from being a band guide to being a press box assistant and more. At the end of the competition, the UofL Drumline (ULD) plays a series of cadences as all of the finalist bands reenter the stadium for the trophy ceremony.

== Patrick Henry Hughes ==
In 2006, trumpeter Patrick Henry Hughes joined the Cardinal Marching Band. Patrick was a young man who had been born without eyes and, furthermore, was reliant on a wheelchair, unable to walk. Patrick would play trumpet while his father (Patrick John Hughes) pushed him in his wheelchair through the marching drills. This visible commitment attracted increasing crowd and media attention throughout the fall football season, and the pair of Patricks were featured in a variety of television and newspaper coverage.

=== Extreme Makeover: Home Edition ===
In November 2007, at the suggestion of a member of the CMB, ABC's Extreme Makeover: Home Edition came to Louisville to remake Hughes' family home. As part of a community project that the show routinely does at the suggestion of the recipient of the home makeover, the band's practice field was given a makeover. The show filmed at two CMB rehearsals—one rehearsal on the old field and one rehearsal at the unveiling of the new field. New lights and a new sound system were installed for better practice conditions. Other additions to the new field include a new shed for the storage of both instruments and equipment, a roofed sitting area to escape the sun's heat, and water fountains to hydrate the band members. The new field is fenced off and has a tall gate that displays the name of the field: "Patrick Henry Hughes Field".

== Bradford Rogers ==
In 2021 Brad Rogers took on the position of assistant director of athletic bands at the University of Louisville and for the Cardinal Marching band, the role previously held by Jason Cumberledge. Before becoming the assistant director, Rogers taught multiple high school bands in the state of Kentucky. He settled in Oldham County Kentucky and taught as the band director of Oldham County High School for nearly 40 years. On July 7, 2025, Rogers died while in Europe on the Musician's Abroad Trip. Despite his short time with the university, he was beloved by the band and staff at the University of Louisville. He is survived by his wife, Pat Rogers, two daughters, and granddaughter. A scholarship fund called the "Bradford Dean Rogers Music Ed Fund" has been created to support future music educators.

== Music ==
=== CDs ===
The marching band has released three CD recordings.

In 1991, the UofL Cardinal Marching Band was among the first marching bands to release a recording on CD. Recorded at the Kentucky Center for the Arts in November 1990, the CMB performed charts and percussion features from the landmark 1990–91 football season that culminated with Coach Howard Schnellenberger leading the Cardinals to an historic victory over Alabama in the 1991 Sunkist Fiesta Bowl in Tempe, Ariz.

The second was 2007 Highlights. The CD was engineered and recorded by Christopher Jones and Tim Haertel. It was produced by TNT Productions, Inc.

The third recording was released in 2022, titled "At the Post." It was engineered and produced by John Parks of Tallahassee, Florida.

== See also ==
- UofL Cardinal Bird Mascot
- The University of Louisville Collegiate Chorale
- The University of Louisville Cardinal Singers
