= O salutaris hostia =

Eucharistic hymn written by Thomas Aquinas

"O Salutaris Hostia" (Latin, "O Saving Victim" or "O Saving Sacrifice") is a section of one of the Eucharistic hymns written by Thomas Aquinas for the Feast of Corpus Christi and the Hour of Lauds in the Divine Office. It is actually the last two stanzas of the hymn Verbum supernum prodiens and is used for the Adoration of the Blessed Sacrament. The other two hymns written by Aquinas for the Feast contain the famous sections Panis angelicus and Tantum ergo.

== Text ==
Latin text	Literal Translation	Verse Rendering
O salutaris Hostia, Quae caeli pandis ostium: Bella premunt hostilia, Da robur, fer auxilium. Uni trinoque Domino Sit sempiterna gloria, Qui vitam sine termino Nobis donet in patria. Amen.	O saving Victim, Who expandest the door of heaven, Hostile armies press, Give strength; bear aid. To the One and Triune Lord, May there be everlasting glory; who life without end gives us in the homeland. Amen.	O saving Victim, opening wide The gate of Heaven to man below; Our foes press hard on every side; Thine aid supply; thy strength bestow. To thy great name be endless praise, Immortal Godhead, One in Three. Oh, grant us endless length of days, In our true native land with thee. Amen.

=== Local usage ===
As a liturgical text, the hymn is traditionally sung in Latin, but after the introduction of vernacular languages, it is also sung in the vernacular.

In Notre-Dame de Paris a middle stanza is inserted:

Latin Text	Literal Translation
O vere digna Hostia, Spes unica fidelium: In te confidit Francia; Da pacem, serva lilium.	O truly worthy Victim, Only hope of the faithful : in Thee trusts France; Give peace, conserve the lily.

In Scotland a similar middle stanza is inserted:

Latin Text	Literal Translation
Immaculata Hostia, Spes unica fidelium: In te confidit Scotia; Da pacem, serva cirsium.	O Immaculate Victim, Only hope of the faithful : in Thee trusts Scotland; Give peace, conserve the thistle.

== Musical settings ==
William Byrd composed a setting for this hymn in the late 1500s. Marc-Antoine Charpentier composed six settings for "O salutaris Hostia": H.236 (1670), H.262 (1690), H.261 (1690), H.36 (1690), H.248 (1679–80), and H.249 (1681). Spanish composer Arriaga wrote a motet on the hymn for two tenors, bass and strings in 1823. Gioachino Rossini composed two settings of the hymn: one as a standalone piece for chorus and the other as a movement for solo soprano in his Petite messe solennelle. Both stanzas are retained in Arthur Honegger's 1939 setting for mezzo-soprano and piano, whereas only the first stanza is included in Vytautas Miškinis' setting for mixed choir a cappella, O salutaris hostia, in 1991. The first stanza is also inserted as part of the Sanctus of Robert Schumann's Mass in C minor, Op. posth. 147 (1852–53). San Francisco-based composer David Conte (b. 1955) included the hymn as the first movement of his Two Hymns in Honor of the Blessed Sacrament (2005).
