= University of Louisville Cardinal Singers =

The University of Louisville Cardinal Singers is a choir consisting of between 29 and 40 members, and is the most selective choral ensemble at the University of Louisville in Kentucky.

== History ==
The Cardinal Singers were founded in 1970 under the name University Singers by the late William C. Lathon, former University of Louisville professor in the Schools of Music and Education, as an outreach organization for the University of Louisville. In 1980 they were appointed by then Governor John Y. Brown, Jr. as Commonwealth of Kentucky "ambassadors of good will." Mr. Lathon conducted the ensemble until 1991, when Shirley Wilkinson, long-time Jefferson County Public Schools (Kentucky) choral director, took over the leadership of the Singers. Dr. Kent Hatteberg began conducting the ensemble in 1997, and the name was changed to "Cardinal Singers" in 1998 to include the school's mascot. The ensemble rehearses twice weekly, and students receive a half credit for participation.

The outreach mission of the Cardinal Singers continues as a focus today, and the Singers have made a number of appearances nationally and internationally participating in competitions, seminars, and benefits.

== Performances, awards and events ==
- Internationales Chorfest in Magdeburg, Germany 2022
- 11th International Choir Competition, Zadar, Croatia 2018
  - Top score (95/100), Abbess Čika's Golden Cross
  - Grand Prix of the City of Zadar winner
  - Special award for best program
- Xi'an International Choral Festival, Xi'an, China 2017
- Harmonie-Festival- Lindenholzhausen, Germany 2017
  - First Prize in mixed choir category
  - Second Prize in sacred music category, special prize for best program
  - Second Prize in folk music category
- Gotham SINGS! Collegiate Choral Showcase at Carnegie Hall, New York, New York 2017
- ACDA National Conference, Minneapolis, Minnesota 2017
- China International Chorus Festival, Beijing, 2016
- ACDA Southern Division Conference, Chattanooga, Tennessee 2016
- NCCO National Conference, Portland, Oregon 2015
- Taipei International Choral Festival, Taiwan 2015
- Singapore International Choral Festival, Singapore 2015
- Malmgren Concert Series at Syracuse University, Syracuse, NY 2014
- Sing'n'Joy Louisville host choir and festival choir, Louisville, Kentucky 2013
- Vietnam International Choir Competition, Vietnam 2013
  - Hội An Choir Grand Prize
  - Gold Diploma, Category winners in Mixed
  - Gold Diploma, Category winners in Folklore
  - Gold Diploma, Category winners in Sacred
- Yeosu International Choir Competition and Festival, South Korea 2013
  - Overall Grand Prize
  - First place Mixed choirs category
  - First place Sacred category
  - Second place Pop/Jazz category
  - Second place Folk/Gospel/Spiritual category
  - Best Conductor Award (Dr. Kent Hatteberg)
- ACDA National Conference, Dallas, Texas 2013
- U.S./Cuba Choral Summit, Cuba 2012
- INTERKULTUR World Rankings as of April, 2012
  - No. 1 Overall
  - No. 1 Mixed Choir
  - No. 6 Pop, Jazz, and Gospel
- ACDA Southern Division Conference, Winston-Salem, North Carolina 2012
- NCCO National Conference, Fort Collins, Colorado 2011
- International Choir Days Mainhausen, Germany 2011
  - First Prize in jazz choirs category
  - Men of Cardinal Singers, First Prize in male choir category
  - Second Prize in mixed choirs category
- International Chamber Choir Competition Marktoberdorf, Germany 2011
  - Second Prize
  - Gustave Charlier-Anna Maroye-prize for the best interpretation of a religious choral work
- Harmonie-Festival- Lindenholzhausen, Germany 2011
  - First Prize in mixed choir category
  - Women of Cardinal Singers, Second Prize in female chamber choir category
  - Men of Cardinal Singers, Third Prize in male chamber choir category
- Taipei International Choral Festival, Taiwan 2010
- Beijing International Choral Festival, China 2010
- INTERKULTUR (World Choir Games) 2010
  - First Prize in Mixed Choirs
  - Second Place for MUSICA MUNDI World Ranking List Top 1.000
- Grand Prix of Choral Music - Busan, South Korea 2009
  - First Prize in Sacred Competition
  - First Prize in Mixed Chamber Choir Competition
- ACDA Southern Division Conference: Headliner Concert - March 2008
- Voices of the Baltics Conference - Seminar Choir - Tallinn, Estonia 2007
- Tolosa Choral Contest - Tolosa, Spain 2006
  - Women of Cardinal Singers, Third Prize in Profane Category
  - Women of Cardinal Singers, Third Prize in Sacred Category
  - Cardinal Singers, Third Prize in Folklore Category
- World Symposium on Choral Music – Kyoto, Japan 2005
- Harmonie-Festival– Lindenholzhausen, Germany 2005
  - First Prize in the mixed chamber choir category
  - Preis des Bundestagspräsidenten der Bundesrepublik Deutschland – for the highest score of all choirs.
  - Award for outstanding interpretation of world premier: Laudate pueri, Dominum by Vitautas Miškinis.
- International Chamber Choir Competition– Marktoberdorf, Germany 2005.
  - Second Prize
  - Conductor's prize for the best interpretation of a contemporary choral work: "Ich bin das Brot des Lebens" by Wolfram Buchenberg.
- International Conducting Seminar Choir – Marktoberdorf, Germany 2005
- International Choir Olympics – Bremen, Germany 2004
- ACDA Southern Division Conference, Nashville, Tennessee 2004
  - First Prize Spiritual/Gospel Category (category winners)
  - First Prize Chamber Choir Category (category winners)
  - Fourth Prize Musica Contemporanea Category
- Third International Johannes Brahms Choral Competition – Wernigerode, Germany 2003
  - Gold Diploma, Third Prize in Chamber Choir Category
  - Gold Diploma, Category winners in Spiritual/Gospel Category

== Local events ==
Locally, the Cardinal Singers perform for a variety of community events on and off campus, ranging from holiday concerts at the Louisville Speed Art Museum and St Martin of Tours Catholic Church for the WUOL Holiday Concert to singing the national anthem at the Louisville Cardinals basketball games. In February 2004 the Cardinal Singers were selected to perform at the American Choral Directors Association Southern Division Conference in Nashville, Tennessee. In July 2005 they gave a concert/demonstration for the Kentucky Choral Directors Association Summer Symposium and sang for the conducting session led by Anton Armstrong. In February 2006, the Cardinal Singers performed at the Kentucky Music Educators Association Conference and received wide acclaim.

== See also ==
- The University of Louisville Collegiate Chorale
