= Ąžuoliukas =

Lithuanian boys' and youth choir

Ąžuoliukas logo

Ąžuoliukas (Translation: Little Oak Tree) is a Lithuanian boys' and youth choir. The very first Lithuanian boys' choir was established in Vilnius in 1959 by professor Hermanas Perelšteinas. At the beginning, Ąžuoliukas was composed of 30 boys, but later grew into a combination of several boys' and men's choirs and its own music school. The choir did not only grow in talented singers but also in its significant achievements. One of these is the Mineur Prix in the International Children's Choir Competition in Nantes, France (1989).

Ąžuoliukas continues to perform in various festivals and concerts in both Lithuania and abroad. The choir is currently conducted by the professor Vytautas Miškinis. In 2009 Ąžuoliukas held numerous concerts to mark its 50th anniversary.
