= O salutaris hostia (Miškinis) =

Composition for choir by Vytautas Miškinis

- Chorale composition by Vytautas Miškinis
- Text: O salutaris hostia
- Language: Latin
- Composed: 1991
- Published: 2001
- Scoring: mixed choir

O salutaris hostia (O saving victim) is a composition for choir a cappella by Vytautas Miškinis, a setting of the Latin prayer O salutaris hostia. Written in 1991, it was published by Carus in 2001. It has been performed in concerts internationally, and was recorded.

== History ==
Vytautas Miškinis composed O salutaris hostia in 1991 as a choral conductor and professor at the Vilnius Academy of Arts. He has composed more than 700 works of sacred vocal music, including masses, cantatas and motets. The Baltic states are an area of a long tradition of choral music, which culminates in annual singing festivals. The composition was published by Carus-Verlag in 2001.

== Text ==
The text is the first stanza of the Latin prayer O salutaris hostia, written by Thomas Aquinas for Eucharistic adoration.

Latin text

O salutaris Hostia,
Quæ cæli pandis ostium:
Bella premunt hostilia,
Da robur, fer auxilium.

Literal translation

O, Saving Victim,
Who expandest the door of heaven,
Hostile armies press,
Give strength; bear aid.

Verse rendering

O saving Victim, opening wide
The gate of Heaven to us below;
Our foes press hard on every side;
Thine aid supply; thy strength bestow.

== Music ==
The music is set for seven voices, SAATTBB. It begins in E-flat major, in 3/4 time, marked Tranquillo e rubato (quiet and rubato). The duration is given as 3 minutes.

The text is structured in three sections. The beginning, covering the first two lines, is set for a mostly homophonic four-part choir, with the altos and basses at times divided. The third line, "Bella premunt hostilia" (Hostile armies press), is rendered in a Segment 1, with the upper voices, sopranos and divided altos, set against the lower voices, a four-part men's chorus. The upper voices begin. Each of them has a phrase assigned, which they repeat again and again. The sopranos' phrase takes 5 beats, the two different phrases of the two alto parts take 7 beats. The sopranos enter first, then the first altos, then second altos. While they keep the pattern, the men's chorus sings the text three times in growing intensity, which the upper voices match. The segment has been described as of "striking incantation effect".

The fourth line appears in Segment 2, in a similar pattern but with different material. The conclusion, named Tempo I, is a slightly shortened repetition of the beginning.

== Performances and recordings ==
O salutaris hostia was featured in benefit concerts commemorating the victims of the Riga catastrophe, performed by the Estonian Academy of Music and Theatre Choir at two churches in Tallinn and the Helsinki Cathedral in December 2013. The work opened a concert by the composer's Ažuoliukas Boys and Youth Choir on the occasion of Lithuania's presidency of the Council of the European Union, at Le Flagey in Brussels on 15 December 2013. It has been selected for choral workshops. It was recorded as part of a collection Miskinis: Thoughts of psalms. Contemporary choral music from Lithuania by Carus. A 2013 recording, Mysterious Nativity, performed by Les Métaboles conducted by Léo Warynski, combines the work with Pärt's Magnificat and Salve regina, and works by Dimitri Tchesnokov, Alfred Schnittke and Georgy Sviridov. In 2017, it was recorded in the collection Aurora: polifonia del XX secolo by the Calycanthus choir, conducted by Pietro Ferrario.
