= Cardinal Bird =

Mascot of the University of Louisville

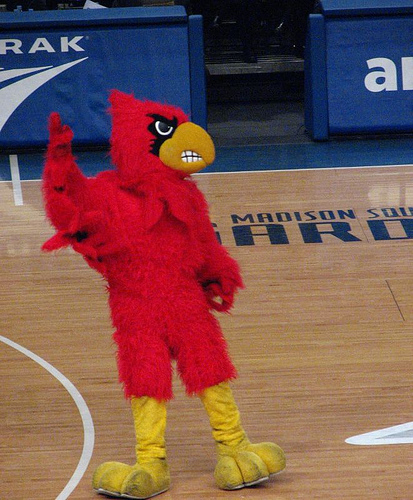
The Cardinal at Madison Square Garden

Louie the Cardinal is the mascot of the University of Louisville. The Cardinal was chosen as the mascot after 1913, selected because the northern cardinal is the state bird of Kentucky. The school colors of black and red were adopted later.

The Cardinal appears at university sporting events, notably skydiving into Cardinal Stadium for each home football game. He also attends other community events during the year. He is considered a part of the "Spirit Groups" and is a member of the cheerleading team. In 2004, the Cardinal Bird was presented with the National Cheerleaders Association's Most Collegiate Mascot award. On occasion, the Cardinal will travel over to the school marching band's section to conduct the players from the band's podium.

The Cardinal is nicknamed "Louie". This is an homage to the name of both its school and city, as they are sometimes pronounced "Louie-ville." Others choose to abbreviate his name, nicknaming him "C.B."

His costume weighs over 50 pounds.

The Louisville Cardinal costume was first constructed in 1953 by Frances Goldsmith. The first person documented to wear said costume at an athletics event was Townsel Adams.
