= Kaunas State Choir =

The Kaunas State Choir is a professional choir based in Kaunas, Lithuania, founded in October 1969 by professor of the Lithuanian Academy of Music and Theatre Petras Bingelis. The choir is noted for its collaboration with violinist and conductor Yehudi Menuhin. It has also toured internationally with productions of Handel's Messiah.

== Discography ==
- Beethoven, Symphony No. 9 Choral
- Lithuania My Dear, National and sacred music by Lithuanian composers
- Carl Orff, Carmina Burana
- Schubert, Mass No. 4 in C major, Mass No. 5 in A flat major
- Handel, Messiah
- Haydn, Die Schöpfung/The Creation
