= University of Louisville Collegiate Chorale =

Collegiate Chorale is the primary choral ensemble at the University of Louisville. Conducted by Dr. Kent Hatteberg, the Chorale performs primarily unaccompanied repertoire and has commissioned works by Lithuanian composers Vytautas Miškinis and Vaclovas Augustinas. The Chorale enjoyed rising popularity in the late 1990s and now performs regularly at national choral events around the United States.

== Events ==
- 8th National Collegiate Choral Organization (NCCO) National Conference, College Park, Maryland 2019
- ACDA National Conference, Chicago, Illinois 2011
  - Small Ensemble Rehearsal Techniques session with Simon Carrington
  - Reading Session Choir
- Kentucky Music Educators Association State Conference – Louisville, Kentucky 2011
- ACDA National Conference, Oklahoma City, Oklahoma 2009
- 2nd NCCO National Conference 2008, Cincinnati, Ohio
- ACDA Southern Division Conference, Headliner Concert 2008 with Cardinal Singers
- American Choral Directors Association National Convention – Los Angeles, California 2005
- American Orff-Schulwek National Convention – Louisville, Kentucky 2003
- National MENC Convention – Nashville, Tennessee 2002
- Kentucky Music Educators Association State Conference – Louisville, Kentucky 2002
- Inauguration of George W. Bush – Washington, D.C. 2001
- "Together We Sing" celebration, American Choral Directors Association National Convention – San Antonio, Texas 2001
- American Choral Directors Association Southern Division Conference – Orlando, Florida 2000
- Kentucky Music Educators Association State Conference – Louisville, Kentucky 1998

== Major works ==
The Collegiate Chorale has become well known in the region for performing various major works with the Louisville Orchestra, Orchestra Kentucky and Louisville's Choral Arts Society, including the world premiere of Felix Mendelssohn's Gloria in November 1997.

- Beethoven's Symphony No. 9 - May 2019
- Mozart's Requiem - October, 2018
- Michael Gordon's Natural History - April 2018
- Holst's The Planets - February 2018 (Women of the University of Louisville Collegiate Chorale)
- Mahler's Symphony No. 2 - October 2016
- Bernstein's Mass - September 2015
- Orff's Carmina Burana – October 2014
- Beethoven's Symphony No. 9 – April 2014
- Britten's War Requiem – April 2013
- Orff's Carmina Burana – February 2013
- Mozart's Coronation Mass – January 2013
- Verdi's Requiem – January 2010
- Dominick Argento's Cenotaph (World Premiere) 2009
- Ralph Vaughan Williams's Dona Nobis Pacem – 2009
- Rihards Dubra's Te Deum – 2008
- Berlioz's Romeo and Juliet – 2008
- Saint-Saëns' Samson and Dalila – 2008
- Wolfgang Amadeus Mozart's Die Zauberflöte - September 2007
- Ralph Vaughan Williams' Toward the Unknown Region - March 2007
- John Adams' Harmonium - March 2007
- Howard Shore's Lord of the Rings Symphony - January 2007
- Mozart's Requiem - January 2007
- Mendelssohn's A Midsummer Night's Dream - October 2006
- Gounod's Mors et Vita - September 2006
- Poulenc's Gloria – March 2006
- Beethoven's Symphony No. 9 – March 2006
- Schubert's Mass in C – January 2006
- Mozart's Vesperae Solennes de Confessore – October 2005
- Verdi's Quattro pezzi sacri – October 2005
- Orff's Carmina Burana – February 2005
- Mozart's Coronation Mass – January 2005
- Verdi's Requiem – March 2004
- Vaughan Williams' Sea Symphony – February 2004
- Brahms's Schicksalslied – February 2004
- Britten's War Requiem – March 2003
- Beethoven's Symphony No. 9 – May 2002
- Kodály's Budavari Te Deum – March 2002
- Poulenc's Stabat Mater - March 2002

== See also ==
- The University of Louisville Cardinal Singers
- American Choral Directors Association
