= Louisville Cardinals =

Intercollegiate sports teams of the University of Louisville

- University: University of Louisville
- Nickname: Cardinals
- NCAA: Division I (FBS)
- Conference: Atlantic Coast Conference
- Athletic director: Josh Heird
- Location: Louisville, Kentucky
- Varsity teams: 23
- Football stadium: L&N Federal Credit Union Stadium
- Basketball arena: KFC Yum! Center
- Baseball stadium: Jim Patterson Stadium
- Soccer stadium: Lynn Stadium
- Colors: Red and black
- Mascot: Louie the Cardinal
- Fight song: "Fight! U of L"
- Website: gocards.com

Atlantic Coast Conference logo in Louisville's colors

The Louisville Cardinals (also known as the Cards) are the NCAA athletic teams representing the University of Louisville in 21 varsity sports. The Cardinals are members of the Atlantic Coast Conference.

Louisville previously competed in Conference USA from 1995 through 2005, and the Big East Conference from 2005 through 2013. The Cardinals captured 17 regular season Big East titles and 33 Big East Tournament titles totaling 50 Big East Championships across all sports. On November 28, 2012, Louisville received and accepted an invitation to join the ACC and became a participating member in all sports in 2014. Since joining the ACC, the Cards have won 17 regular season ACC Championships and 2 ACC Tournament Championships across all sports.

Since 2000, Louisville is the only NCAA team to win a BCS bowl game; to appear in the NCAA Division I men's basketball Final Four, the College World Series, and the NCAA Division I women's basketball Final Four; and to finish as runner-up in the Men's soccer College Cup. It is one of only six schools that has appeared more than once in each of the following events—a BCS bowl game, the men's and women's basketball Final Fours, and the College World Series—and Louisville's span of seven school years (2006–07 to 2012–13) is the shortest among these schools. Also, it is the first school ever to win a BCS bowl game, appear in the men's and women's basketball Final Fours, and appear in the College World Series in the same school year, doing so in 2012–13. In 2016, Lamar Jackson won the Heisman Trophy, distinguishing him as the nation's best college football player, becoming the first Louisville player to win the award.

Louisville finished in the top 30 in the NACDA Learfield Sports Directors' Cup every year from 2014 to 2018 and earned its highest ever finish of 26th in 2017.

== Varsity teams ==
Louisville competes in 21 intercollegiate varsity sports: Men's sports include baseball, basketball, cross country, football, golf, soccer, swimming & diving, tennis and track & field; while women's sports include basketball, cross country, field hockey, golf, lacrosse, rowing, soccer, softball, swimming & diving, tennis, track & field and volleyball.

Men's sports	Women's sports
Baseball	Basketball
Basketball	Cross country
Cross country	Field hockey
Football	Golf
Golf	Lacrosse
Soccer	Rowing
Swimming & diving	Soccer
Tennis	Softball
Track and field^{1}	Swimming & diving
	Tennis
	Track and field^{1}
	Volleyball
^{1} – includes both indoor and outdoor.

=== Baseball ===
Team Established: 1909
All Time Record: 2,113–1,624–11
Playing Facility: Jim Patterson Stadium (2005)
Head Coach: Dan McDonnell
NCAA Tournament Appearances: 15
Last NCAA Appearance: 2025
College World Series Appearances: 5 (2007, 2013, 2014, 2017, 2019, 2025)
Super Regional Appearances: 8 (2007, 2009, 2013, 2014, 2015, 2016, 2017, 2019, 2025)
Conference Titles: 10
Conference Tournament Titles: 2
Drafted Players: 105 (as of 2025)
Players In The MLB system: 24 (as of 2025)

The Louisville Cardinals baseball team was established in 1909. The program made its first NCAA tournament appearance in 2002 under Coach Lelo Prado.

In 2007, Louisville hired Dan McDonnell who immediately brought the program success. In his first season, the Cardinals won the first NCAA tournament game in program history, won an NCAA Regional, hosted its first Louisville Super Regional, and made its first College World Series appearance.

In Coach McDonnell's 19 seasons, Louisville has won two conference tournament championships, nine regular season conference championships, reached the NCAA tournament 15 times, won 10 NCAA regionals, and made six College World Series appearances.

The 2006 Baseball Cardinals broke the Big East Conference Tournament record with a .409 batting average.

In 2007, the Cardinals finished the season with a 47–24 record and ranked as high as 6th in some major polls while advancing to the College World Series for the first time in school history.

=== Men's basketball ===
National Championships
1980, 1986, 2013*
Final Four Years
1959, 1972, 1975, 1980, 1982
1983, 1986, 2005, 2012*, 2013*

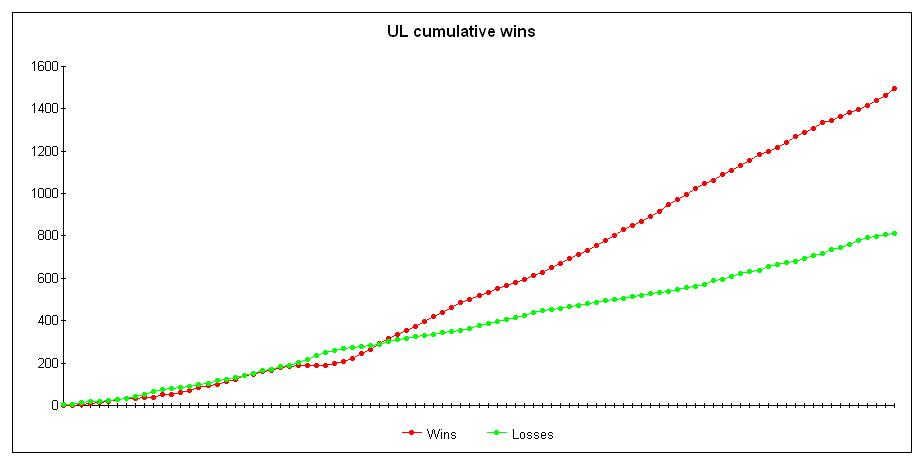
Graph of U of L's cumulative all-time wins and losses

Team Established: 1911
All Time Record: 1,825–915 (66.6%)
Playing Facility: KFC Yum! Center (2010)
Court: Denny Crum Court (2007)
Head Coach:
NCAA Men's Basketball Championships: 2 (1980, 1986, 2013*)
NCAA Final Fours: 10
NCAA tournament Appearances: 43
Last NCAA Tournament Appearance: 2019
Conference regular season Championships: 23 (7 Missouri Valley Conference, 12 Metro Conference, 1 Conference USA, 2 Big East, 1 American Athletic Conference)
Conference Tournament Champions: 19 (2 Kentucky Intercollegiate Athletic Conference, 11 Metro Conference, 2 Conference USA, 3 Big East, 1 American Athletic Conference)
NIT Appearances: 15 (Won 1956 NIT Championship)
All-Americans: 21
Drafted Players: 70
Players In The NBA: 6 (Gorgui Dieng, Montrezl Harrell, Damion Lee, Donovan Mitchell, Terry Rozier, Ray Spalding)

Louisville's basketball tradition was established by Muhlenberg County native, Coach Bernard "Peck" Hickman. The Cards never had a losing season in Hickman's 23 years, prior to his arrival the team had only had 11 winning seasons. In 1956, Hickman's team won the NIT, then considered a national championship on a par with the NCAA tournament. After retiring, Hickman became the school's Athletics Director and hired then John Wooden assistant and future Hall of Famer Denny Crum, who led the team to two NCAA Division I basketball championships (1980 and 1986) and six Final Fours. The men's basketball team currently ranks fifth in all-time NCAA tournament wins and has been in the top-five in average attendance each year since the 1982–83 season. Perennial rivals include the University of Kentucky, University of Cincinnati, and the University of Memphis.

=== Women's basketball ===
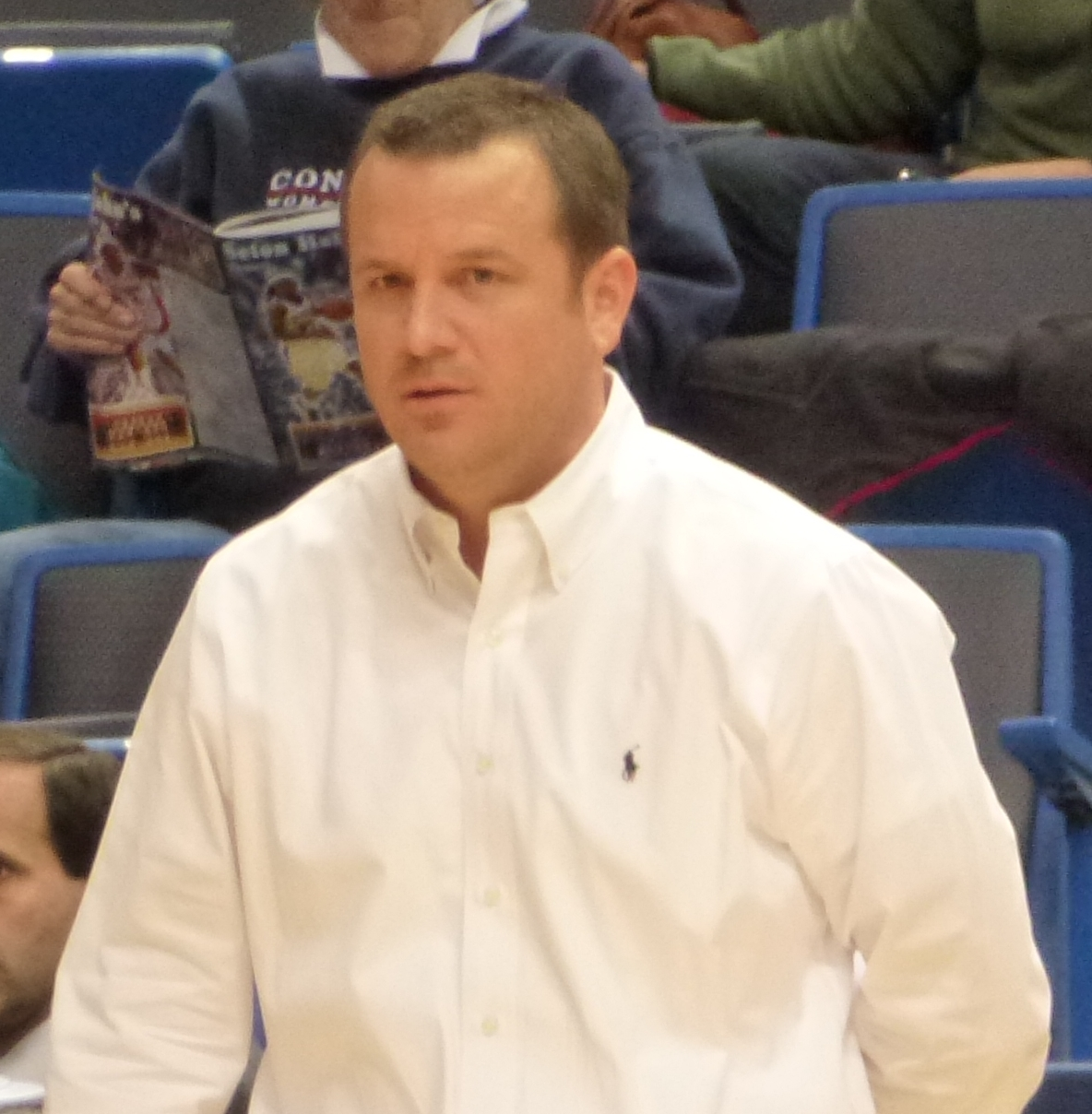
Jeff Walz

The team was established in 1975.

All Time Record : 876–491 (64.1%)
Playing facility: KFC Yum! Center (2010)
Head coach: Jeff Walz (401–108 in fifteen seasons)
Conference titles: 10 (1983–84, 1991–92, 1992–93, 1996–97, 1998–99, 2000–01, 2017–18, 2018–19, 2019–20, 2020–21)
Conference Tournament titles: 8 (1978, 1979, 1980, 1981, 1983, 1984, 1993, 2018)
NCAA appearances: 24
Last NCAA appearance: 2022
All-Americans: 6
Drafted players: 19 (including 2009 #1 pick Angel McCoughtry 2014 first-rounder Shoni Schimmel and 2019 #2 pick Asia Durr)
Final Four appearances: 4 (2009,2013,2018,2022)

=== Cheerleading ===
The cheerleading squads have won multiple championships with the large co-ed squad coached by James Speed winning 18 National Cheerleaders Association Collegiate National championships (1985–86, 1989, 1992, 1994, 1996, 1998–99, 2003–09, 2011, 2016, 2018), the all-girl squad coached by Misty Hodges winning 18 championships (2001–05, 2007–09, 2011–12, 2014–2019, no competition 2020, 2021–22) and the small co-ed cheerleading squad winning 12 championships (2005–06, 2008–09, 2011, 2013–17, 2021–22). The University of Louisville Spirit Groups hold more national titles than any other sport offered at the university.

The Cardinal Bird Mascot also falls under the jurisdiction of the University of Louisville Spirit Groups. The "Bird" also competes with the cheerleaders in national competitions and makes regular appearances in the Louisville Metro Area.

=== Cross country ===
==== Men's ====
- 2006: Finished 15th at NCAA Championships
- 2007: Finished 9th at NCAA Championships

Conference titles: 2 (2007, 2013)

==== Women's ====
Conference titles: 1 (1996)

=== Field hockey ===
Team Established: 1927
All Time Record: 334–373–16 (.462)
Fall 2016 record: 15–6
Playing Facility: Trager Stadium (2000)
Head Coach: Justine Sowry
Conference Titles: 6 (2002, 2004, 2006, 2007, 2008, 2013)
Conference Tournament Titles: 4 (1977, 1978, 2003, 2004)
NCAA Appearances: 6
Last NCAA Appearance: 2016
All-Americans: 7

The Louisville women's field hockey team received the NFHCA Division I National Academic Team Award for their 3.65 GPA, which was the highest in the nation. The team also won two MAC tourney titles in 2003 and 2004 and finished one game back in their first Big East season. Between 2015 and 2017 Ayeisha McFerran was named three times as an NFHCA All-American while playing for the women's field hockey team. She was also a member of the Ireland team that played in the 2018 Women's Hockey World Cup final and was named Goalkeeper of the Tournament.

=== Football ===
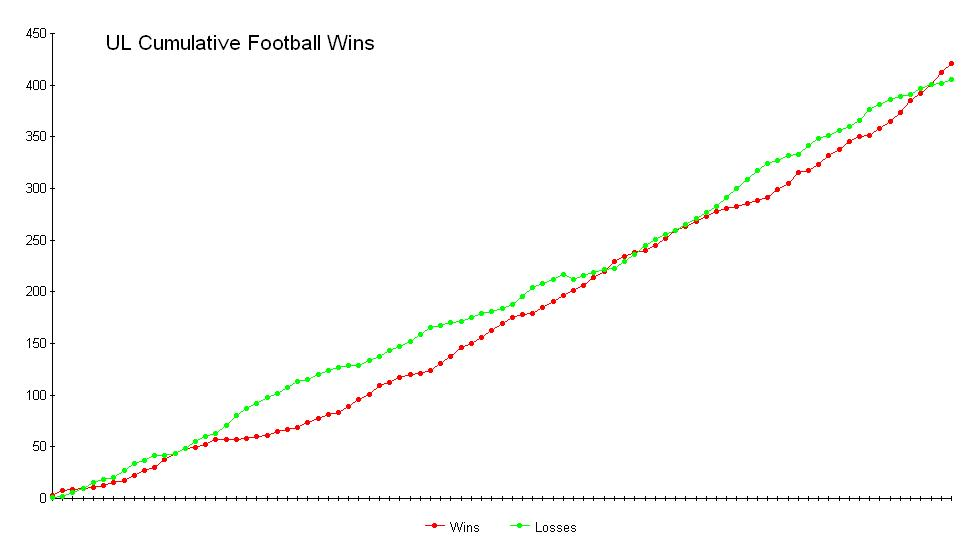
Graph of cumulative all-time wins for Louisville football (as of 2006)

Team Established: 1912
All Time Record: 568–504–17 (.529)
2025 record: 9–4
Playing Facility: L&N Federal Credit Union Stadium (1998)
Head Coach: Jeff Brohm
Conference titles: 9
Bowl appearances: 28
Last bowl appearance: 2025
All-Americans: 29
Drafted players: 169
Players in the NFL: 34
Heisman Trophy winners: 1

Year	Bowl	Opponent	Result
1957	Sun Bowl	Drake	W 34–20
1970	Pasadena Bowl	Long Beach State	T 24–24
1977	Independence Bowl	Louisiana Tech	L 14–24
1990	Fiesta Bowl	Alabama	W 34–7
1993	Liberty Bowl	Michigan State	W 18–7
1998	Motor City Bowl	Marshall	L 29–48
1999	Humanitarian Bowl	Boise State	L 31–34
2000	Liberty Bowl	Colorado State	L 17–22
2001	Liberty Bowl	BYU	W 28–10
2002	GMAC Bowl	Marshall	L 15–38
2003	GMAC Bowl	Miami (OH)	L 28–49
2004	Liberty Bowl	Boise State	W 44–40
2005	Gator Bowl	Virginia Tech	L 24–35
2006	Orange Bowl (BCS)	Wake Forest	W 24–13
2010	Beef 'O' Brady's Bowl	Southern Miss	W 31–28
2011	Belk Bowl	NC State	L 24–31
2012	Sugar Bowl (BCS)	Florida	W 33–23
2013	Russell Athletic Bowl	Miami (FL)	W 36–9
2014	Belk Bowl	Georgia	L 14–37
2015	Music City Bowl	Texas A&M	W 27–21
2016	Citrus Bowl	LSU	L 9–29
2017	TaxSlayer Bowl	Mississippi State	L 27–31
2019	Music City Bowl	Mississippi State	W 38–28
2021	First Responder Bowl	Air Force	L 28–31
2022	Fenway Bowl	Cincinnati	W 24–7
2023	Holiday Bowl	USC	L 28–42
2024	Sun Bowl	Washington	W 35–34
2025	Boca Raton Bowl	Toledo	W 27–22

Under the guidance of head coaches John L. Smith (1998–2002) and Bobby Petrino (2003–2007), the Louisville football program went to nine consecutive bowl games, a streak that ended in the 2007 season. After a three-year hiatus under Coach Kragthorpe from 2007 to 2009 Louisville has been to eight consecutive bowl games under Coaches Charlie Strong and Bobby Petrino.

Under Coach Smith, the Cardinals spent 11 weeks in the AP Top 25, including a #17 final finish in 2000.

Under Coach Petrino, the Cardinals were ranked in all but three of the weekly AP polls since the beginning of the 2004 season. This includes a #6 final finish in both 2004 and 2006, as well as a #19 final finish in 2005.

In the 2004 season, the Cardinals went 11–1 and won the Conference USA Championship; their only loss was against third-ranked Miami, a game in which the Cardinals led by 17 in the third quarter before falling. The Cardinals went to the Liberty Bowl, where they defeated #10-ranked and previously undefeated Boise State.

In 2005, the Cardinals finished 9–3 after falling to Virginia Tech in the Gator Bowl and completed the season ranked #19 in the AP Poll and #20 in the Coaches' Poll.

In 2006, the Cardinals began the season ranked #13 in the AP poll and finished the season with a 12–1 record, their first Big East Conference title and completed the season with a 24–13 victory over the Atlantic Coast Conference champion Wake Forest in the Orange Bowl. The Cards finished the 2006 season ranked #6 in the AP Poll and #7 in the Coaches Poll, while being ranked #6 in the Bowl Championship Series Poll.

On January 9, 2007, Steve Kragthorpe was introduced as the new head coach of the Cardinals, within 48 hours after Bobby Petrino announced his departure to take the head coaching position with the Atlanta Falcons of the National Football League. The Cardinals went 6–6 in Kragthorpe's first season and the second season 5–7. He was fired after his third season (2009) ended with a disappointing 4–8 record. Kragthorpe's replacement is Charlie Strong, formerly the defensive coordinator at Florida, and the second African American to head the Cardinals program.

None of the football program's recent success would have been possible without the vision and efforts of former Kentucky All-American and national champion coach (at the University of Miami) Howard Schnellenberger, who was the head coach from 1985 to 1994. His greatest achievement at Louisville was a 34–7 victory over the Alabama Crimson Tide in the 1991 Fiesta Bowl (Alabama finished 7–5), which culminated in Louisville's first national ranking (11th) and a 10–1–1 record.

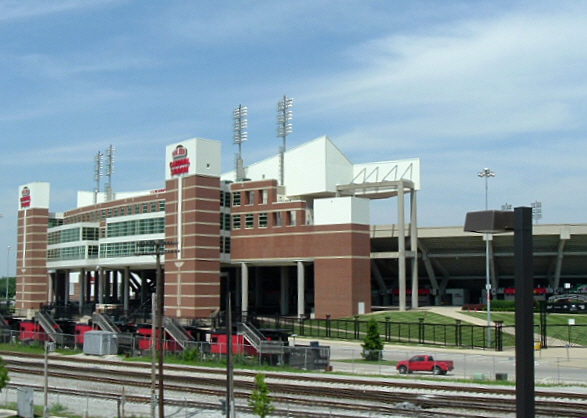
Cardinal Stadium, as viewed from Central Avenue.

The University of Louisville football program's home is Cardinal Stadium.

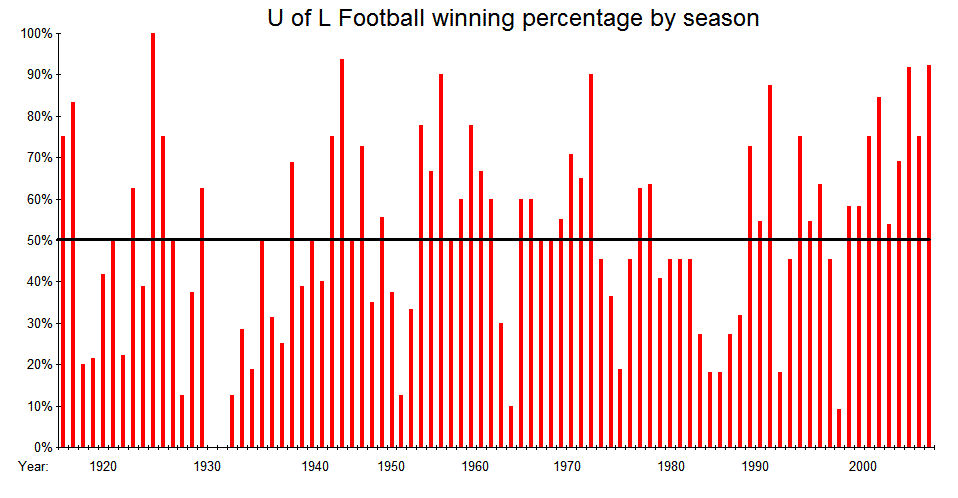
Louisville winning percentage by year

The Louisville football program annually plays for the Governor's Cup awarded to the winner of the Louisville-Kentucky football game. The Keg of Nails is awarded to the winner of the Louisville-Cincinnati football game.

The film The Replacements was rumored to be based on former Cardinal quarterback Ed Rubbert (played by Keanu Reeves), who led the Washington Redskins' 1987 strike team to a 3–0 record en route to the franchise's Super Bowl XXII championship.

Retired jerseys and numbers

Louisville has retired the jerseys, although not their numbers, of the following former Cardinal football players: Bruce Armstrong, Ray Buchanan, Doug Buffone, Ernie Green, Tom Jackson, Joe Jacoby, Otto Knop, Lenny Lyles, Sam Madison, Frank Minnifield, Chris Redman, Otis Wilson, Roman Oben, Dwayne Woodruff, and Jeff Brohm. The Cardinals football program also has retired two numbers: 16, worn by Johnny Unitas, and 8, worn by Lamar Jackson.

=== Golf ===
- Distinguished amateur and now professional golfer Derek Fathauer enjoyed four solid seasons at Louisville as a Cardinal. He was the first player ever from the University of Louisville to be named an All-American.

=== Lacrosse ===
Team Established: 2008
All Time Record: 83–54 (.606)
Spring 2015 record: 10–8
Playing Facility: UofL Lacrosse Stadium (2006)
Head Coach: Scott Teeter

=== Rowing ===
Louisville is one of two universities in the state of Kentucky to have a women's rowing team, the other being Murray State University.

Conference Titles: 3 (2009, 2011, 2014)

=== Soccer ===
==== Women's ====
Team Established: 1985
All Time Record: 221–293–38 (.400)
Fall 2018 record: 12–7–0
Playing Facility: Dr. Mark & Cindy Lynn Stadium (5300)
Head Coach: Karen Ferguson-Dayes
Conference Titles: 1 (2011)
All Americans: 1

==== Men's ====
Team Established: 1979
All Time Record: 309–342–77 (.421)
Playing Facility: Dr. Mark & Cindy Lynn Stadium (5300)
Head Coach: John Michael Hayden
Conference Titles: 4
Conference Tournament Titles: 4
NCAA Tournament Appearances : 10
Elite Eights : 3
College Cup Appearances: 1 (2010)
2010 National Runners Up

Louisville Finishes Historic Season as NCAA Runner-Up

The top-ranked Louisville men's soccer team fell 1–0 to Akron in the 2010 NCAA national championship game in front of 9,672 in Santa Barbara, Calif. The Cardinals, who appeared in the College Cup for the first time in program history, finished the season with a 20–1–3 overall record. Prior to reaching the NCAA Tournament, Louisville won the BIG EAST Red Division regular-season title and captured the BIG EAST Tournament title.

On February 21, 2013, Louisville announced that it would build a new soccer-only stadium on campus. The new stadium, with a capacity of 5,300, is set to open for the 2014 season, and will be known as Dr. Mark and Cindy Lynn Stadium, after their donation of $5 million toward the $17.5 million project.

=== Softball ===
Team Established: 2000
All time record: 685–351 (.663)
Playing Facility: Ulmer Stadium (2000; Capacity: 2,200)
Head Coach: Holly Aprile
Conference championships: 4 (2004, 2006, 2012, 2014)
Conference Tournament championships: 2 (2007, 2012)
NCAA Tournament Appearances: 15
Last NCAA Appearance: 2019
All-Americans: 8

=== Swimming ===
Louisville men's swimming freshman record times as of March 2, 2022, include Abdelrahman Sameh in the 50 freestyle (19.31 in 2020), Murilo Sartori in the 100 freestyle (42.18 in 2022) and 200 freestyle (1:32.38 in 2022), and Daniel Sos in the 200 individual medley (1:43.40 in 2018). Olympians Denis Loktev (Israel) and Denis Petrashov (Kyrgyzstan) have also competed for the team.

=== Tennis ===
Men's :

Coach- Rodrigo Da Silva
Established- 1980
Record- 576–401
Conference Championships- 5 (2000, 2006, 2010, 2011, 2012)
NCAA appearances – 7 – most recent (08-09)

=== Volleyball ===
Team Established: 1975
All Time Record: 900–446 (.663)
Playing Facility: KFC Yum! Center (opened 2010, first used 2011); L&N Federal Credit Union Arena (1990)
Record at KFC Yum! Center: 17–7
Record at L&N Federal Credit Union Arena: 157–19
Head Coach: Dan Meske
Conference Titles: 23 (1982, 1990, 1991, 1992, 1993, 1994, 1995, 1996, 1998, 1999, 2002, 2003, 2004, 2005, 2007, 2011, 2012, 2013, 2015, 2017, 2020, 2021, 2022)
Conference Tournament Titles: 10 (1998, 2000, 2003, 2004, 2006, 2008, 2009, 2010, 2012, 2015)
NCAA Tournament Appearances: 27
National runner-up: 2022, 2024
Final Four: 2021, 2022, 2024
Regional Finals: 2019, 2021, 2022, 2024
Last NCAA Appearance: 2024
All-Americans: 27

Volleyball has traditionally been one of Louisville's most successful programs, led for 15 years by head coach Leonid Yelin, whose .772 career winning percentage ranked 9th among active coaches prior to his retirement after the 2010 season. He was replaced by former Louisville player Anne Kordes, who had spent the previous seven seasons as head coach at Saint Louis. During the 2005 season, Louisville was ranked as high as #6 en route to a 30–3 record, a regular season tie for the Big East title, and a second straight trip to the Sweet 16. In the most recent 2012 season, the team averaged 2,341 fans while playing mainly at the KFC Yum! Center. Their traditional home of Cardinal Arena, with 840 seats, has become too small for the team's current popularity, with fans turned away at several games. While Louisville has sought state funding to expand Cardinal Arena to better meet fan demands and prevent unsafe "standing room only" crowds, it has more recently opted to move full-time into the KFC Yum! Center; of its 19 home matches in the 2012 season, 15 were scheduled for that facility. Louisville also hosted both the 2005 Big East Volleyball tournament and the first two rounds of NCAA volleyball tournament at the Kentucky International Expo Center in Downtown Louisville, and hosted the Women's Final Four in 2012 and 2024 at the KFC Yum! Center.

In 2005, two Cardinals, seniors Lena Ustymenko and Jennifer Hoffman, were named second team All-American. Previously only one Big East volleyball player had been named an All-American. Ustymenko was also named the 2005 Big East player of the year and Hoffman led the nation in hitting percentage in the Card's 6–2 offense. The program has won 15 of its last 16 conference titles (with another in 1983) and has been to the NCAA tourney 17 times since 1982, with 47 players making their all-conference team. The team has a 157–19 all-time record at Cardinal Arena, and is 17–6 at the KFC Yum! Center.

The Cardinal volleyball team has won conference championships 19 times, from Metro, C-USA, Big East, American Athletic, and ACC.

More recently, after the Cardinals joined the ACC in 2014, the Cardinals won the 2015 ACC title, the first ACC crown ever won by any Louisville team. Senior setter Katie George, also notable as that year's Miss Kentucky USA, was named ACC Player of the Year and Setter of the Year. In addition, Kordes was named Coach of the Year, and libero Molly Sauer was named Defensive Player of the Year and Freshman of the Year.

The Cardinal volleyball team moved back into the newly expanded Cardinal Arena in 2017. In April 2019, the local L&N Federal Credit Union donated $2 million to the athletic program, leading the university to rename the venue L&N Federal Credit Union Arena.

In 2021, the Cardinals won the ACC title and entered the NCAA tournament undefeated. Setter Tori Dilfer and middle blocker Anna Stevenson were named first-team All-Americans by the American Volleyball Coaches Association, becoming the program's first-ever first-team All-Americans, and outside hitter Anna DeBeer was named a third-team All-American. Dilfer was also named ACC Setter of the Year. The Cardinals' only loss was in the national semifinals to eventual champion Wisconsin.

=== Ladybirds ===
The University of Louisville Ladybirds dance team has won 20 national titles. The Ladybirds have won nine of the last ten national competitions, including the last four years, in the National Cheerleading Association Championships in Daytona Beach, Fla. The Ladybirds also added the 2014, 2016, 2017 Hip Hop national title to their trophy case. In the years 2016–18 the Ladybirds won a double title, placing first in both the team performance and hip hop categories. Louisville won the Universal Dance Association title in 1995 and 1997. The Ladybirds have long been successful, placing in the top five in their national competition 21 of the last 27 years. The group is under the direction of Sheryl Knight.

== Championships ==
=== NCAA team championships ===
Louisville has won three NCAA team national championships, although the third win in 2013 was vacated by the NCAA.

- Men's (3)
  - Basketball (3): 1980, 1986, 2013 (vacated)
- see also:
  - ACC NCAA team championships
  - List of NCAA schools with the most NCAA Division I championships

=== Other team championships ===
- Men's (2)
  - National Invitation Tournament Basketball (1): 1956
  - National Association of Intercollegiate Basketball Basketball (1): 1948

== Notable non-varsity sports ==
=== Ice hockey ===
The University of Louisville Ice Hockey team was founded in 1995. The University of Louisville Hockey team is a club sport, participating in the Southeast Conference in Division II of the American Collegiate Hockey Association and also the TSCHL. Louisville has 3 back to back TSCHL championships in 2015, 2016, and 2017. They also have 2 ACHA Southeast Regional Appearances (2016, 2017). Recent success can be contributed to recent additions such as coach Brian Graham, who is a two time TSCHL Coach of the Year (2015, 2016), and captain Yannis Soukas, who is the Cardinals' all-time leader in points, winner of the 2016 TSCHL MVP Award, 2016 TSCHL Rookie of the Year Award, and was named to the 1st team All-Conference in 2016, 2017, and 2018.

=== Rugby ===
The University of Louisville Rugby Club was re-founded in 2009, and was promoted to Division II of college rugby in 2011. Louisville Rugby is led by head coach Eric Raney. Louisville Rugby has an active recruiting program, yielding recruits from Kentucky high school rugby all stars. Louisville offers scholarships and grants, funded by the Louisville Rugby Old Boys' Association, to incoming rugby recruits.

== Director's Cup ==
The University of Louisville has risen from 174th in the Director's Cup standings in 1999–2000 to 28th in 2006–07. Louisville finished the 2015–16 year ranked 29th in the NACDA Learfield Sports Directors' Cup.

== All-time records by sports ==
UofL Team	All-Time Record	Winning Percent
Men's Basketball	1,926–998	65.8%
Softball	871–504-1	63.3%
Volleyball	1103–508	68.2%
Women's Basketball	1099–544	66.9%
Men's Tennis	681–490	58.2%
Baseball	2160–1637–11	56.7%
Football	556-499–17	51.8%
Men's Soccer	383–391–99	43.9%
Field Hockey	423–421–16	49.2%
Women's Soccer	302–373–58	41.2%
Overall	9504–6364–202	59.14%
*As of June 26, 2025.

== Sport facilities ==
Facility	Team	Capacity	Years used
Cardinal Stadium	Football	61,800 (55,000, 2010–2018) (42,000, 1998–2010)	1998–present
KFC Yum! Center	Men and Women's Basketball	22,090	2010–present
Jim Patterson Stadium	Baseball	4,000 (2,500, 2006–2012)	2005–present
Cardinal Park Soccer and Track Stadium	Soccer and Track & Field teams through 2013–14 school year; track and field only since fall 2014	2,200	2000–present (track); 2000–2013 (soccer)
L&N Federal Credit Union Arena	Women's volleyball home, Women's Basketball practice facilities	840	1992–present
Ralph Wright Natatorium	Swimming	800	2005–present
Ulmer Stadium	Softball	700	2000–present
Trager Stadium	Field Hockey	1500	2000–present
Bass-Rudd Tennis Center	Tennis	400	1994–present
Lacrosse Field	Women's Lacrosse	300	2006–present
Trager Center	Football indoor practice facility		2006–present
The Yum! Center	Men's Basketball/Women's Volleyball practice facilities		2007–present
Marshall Center	Soccer/Track/Field Hockey strength and conditioning		2008–present
Dr Mark and Cindy Lynn Stadium	Soccer	5,300	2014–present

=== Average per-game attendance by sport ===
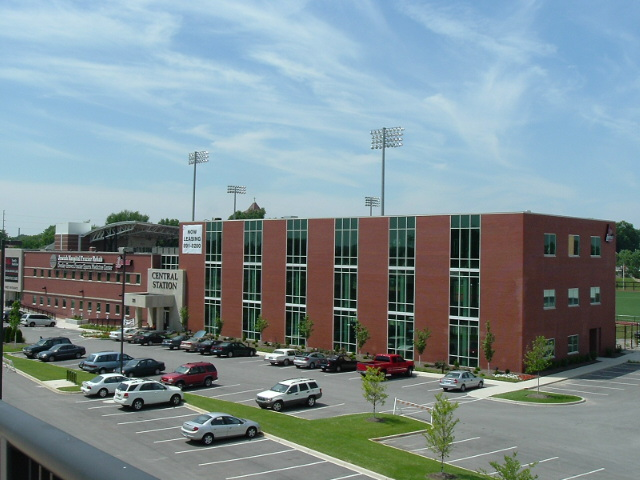
Jim Patterson Baseball Stadium and Sports Medicine Complex

Team	2013–14	2012–13	2011–12	2010–11	2009–10
Football	52,914	49,991	48,538	50,648	32,450
Men's Basketball	21,282	21,571	21,503	21,832	19,397
Women's Basketball	Not yet released	9,358	10,670	10,859	6,398
Volleyball	Not yet released	2,341	1,527		
Men's Soccer	Not yet released	2,215	3,548	2,768	1,300
Baseball	Not yet released	Not yet released	1,528		1,940
Softball	Not yet released	511			441
Women's Soccer	Not yet released	949	625	712	
Field Hockey	Not yet released	370	294	435	282

== Fan support ==
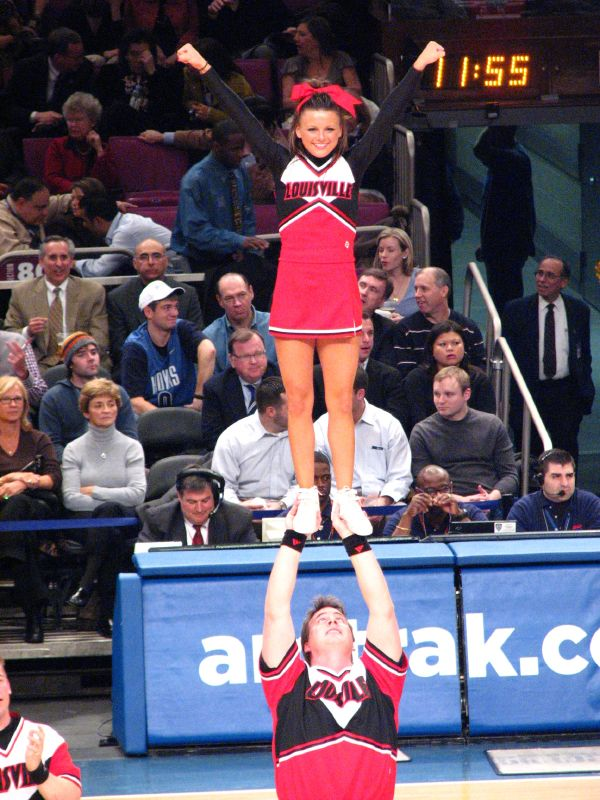
UofL Cardinals cheerleaders cheering on the crowd

Team	National Attendance Rank
Men's basketball	3rd (2016–17)
Women's basketball	3rd (2012–13)
Women's field hockey	5th (2012)
Men's soccer	7th (2012)
Volleyball	14th (2012)
Women's soccer	22nd (2012)
Softball	34th (2013)
Football	38th (2013)
Baseball	25nd (2016)

Attendance ranks are based on average per home game.

In 2005, Louisville was among only a handful of schools to average better than 97 percent attendance to capacity in volleyball, men's basketball, and football.

== Radio affiliates ==
The broadcast team for Louisville men's basketball is Paul Rogers (play-by-play) and Bob Valvano or Doug Ormay (color analyst). The broadcast team for Louisville football is Paul Rogers (play-by-play); Craig Swabek (color analyst) and Doug Ormay (sideline reporter).

Louisville games are broadcast in Lexington KY on WWRW 105.5 FM and WKRD 790 AM & 101.7- Louisville, KY (Flagship Station)

For Women's basketball, Women's Play by play is provided by Jim Kelch, with Adrienne Johnson as the color analyst. All Women's Basketball games are heard on WKRD 790 AM or on FM 101.7 in Louisville.

=== SIRIUS Satellite Radio Louisville broadcasts ===
SIRIUS Satellite Radio, Nelligan Sports Marketing, the University of Louisville and CSTV: College Sports Television announced an agreement on January 10, 2005, making SIRIUS the Official Satellite Radio Partner of the University of Louisville. SIRIUS will broadcast select play-by-play sports of Louisville's nationally ranked college basketball and football teams

- 2011 U of L Football Games on Sirius Satellite Radio
- 2011–12 U of L Men's

== Rivalries ==
=== Kentucky Wildcats ===
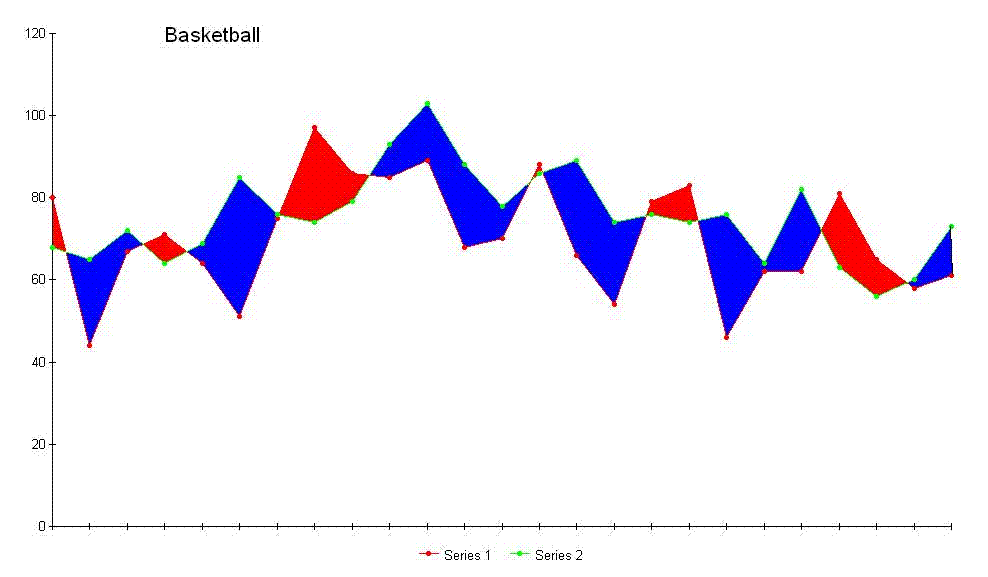
UK has more wins in the basketball rivalry than does U of L.

The Louisville Cardinals rivalry with the Kentucky Wildcats is widely considered one of the most intense college rivalries in the United States. The men's basketball game is called the Battle for the Bluegrass; the football game is officially called the Governor's Cup.

In the early years after the rivalry resumed whoever would win the football game would go on to lose the basketball game. In 2003 Louisville broke that tradition by winning both the football and basketball game and did so again in 2012 and 2025. Kentucky has completed the double themselves four times, in the 2009, 2011, 2018 and 2019 seasons.

Unlike many in-state rivalries that have been played continuously for many decades, these two schools went through a long period from the 1930s to the 1980s of rarely facing one another. They did play frequently from the 1900s to the 1920s. Since the renewal of the men's basketball rivalry in 1983–84 UK leads the modern rivalry 28–13 and the all-time series 37–16. Since the two teams resumed playing football in 1994, Louisville leads the modern series 15–11 but the all-time series is led by UK at 17–15.

Within the intrastate rivalry with the Kentucky Wildcats, the team that has won the football game has lost the following basketball game every year, except in 2003, 2012, and 2025 (when Louisville won both) and 2009, 2011, 2018 and 2019 (when UK won both).

=== Cincinnati Bearcats ===
Known more for an intense basketball rivalry and tradition, Louisville and UC have a football rivalry that has stretched over the span of five conferences from the Missouri Valley Conference, to the Metro Conference to Conference USA, and the Big East Conference. In 2013 it was continued in the American Athletic Conference. It is believed to be the oldest rivalry for the Louisville football team and the second oldest for Cincinnati, only behind the annual game with the Miami RedHawks.

On the gridiron, the two teams compete for the Keg of Nails, currently held by Louisville as winner of the most recent game in the 2022 season. The Bearcats lead the overall series 30–22–1.

=== Other rivalries ===
Louisville also has dormant rivalries with University of Memphis Tigers, West Virginia University, and Marquette University, which have all been on hiatus.

== Olympic representation ==
Louisville has produced 41 Summer Olympians and no WInter Olympians. Louisville-affiliated athletes have won a total of three gold medals.

Olympic medalists of the University of Louisville
Name	Olympiad	Team	Event	Medal
Angel McCoughtry	United Kingdom (2012 London Summer Olympics)	United States	Basketball – Women's Team Tournament	Gold medal – first place
Angel McCoughtry	Brazil (2016 Rio de Janeiro Summer Olympics)	United States	Basketball – Women's Team Tournament	Gold medal – first place
Kelsi Worrell	Brazil (2016 Rio de Janeiro Summer Olympics)	United States	Swimming – Women's 4 × 100 metre medley relay	Gold medal – first place

== See also ==
- Sports in Louisville, Kentucky
- List of University of Louisville people
