= Vytautas Miškinis =

Lithuanian musician

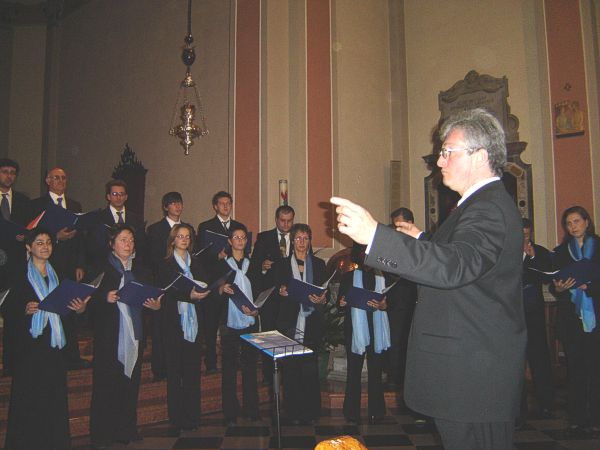
- Vytautas Miškinis conducting
- Born: 5 June 1954 (age 71); Vilnius, Lithuanian SSR, Soviet Union
- Education: Lithuanian Conservatory
- Occupations: Choral conductor; Composer; Academic teacher
- Organizations: Ąžuoliukas; Kaunas State Choir; Lithuanian Academy of Music and Theatre

Vytautas Miškinis (born 5 June 1954) is a Lithuanian composer, choral conductor and academic teacher. He is the artistic director of Ąžuoliukas, a boys' and youth choir and music school, and of other ensembles, performing internationally. He has taught choral conducting at the Lithuanian Academy of Music and Theatre since 1985. His groups have won prizes at international competitions, where he also served as a member of the jury. His compositions are part of the international standard choral repertoire.

== Life ==
Miškinis was born in Vilnius, then Lithuanian SSR, Soviet Union, in a musical family. He began his musical career with the Vilnius Teacher House Boys Choir (now Ąžuoliukas), at the age of seven. He studied at the Vilnius Conservatory from age 17, and became choral director of the junior choir there. He graduated in 1976, in the class of Hermanas Perelšteinas.

For Ąžuoliukas (the name translating to "little oak tree") he assisted Perelšteinas, its founder and conductor, as accompanist and choral conductor, until he took over leadership at age 25. He transformed the organisation to a music school for several hundred children. He conducted the Kaunas State Choir from 1971 to 1975, and the Museum Musicum vocal ensemble from 1991. When Lithuania was free again in 1989, he took the groups to international competitions. The Teacher House Men's Choir achieved the Grand Prix in Nantes that year, a third prize at Gorizia in 1990, first prize in Marktoberdorf in 1991, and Mainhausen in 1993, and second prize in Maribor in 2000, among others. His Museum Musicum earned first prize both in Tampere in 1992 and Mainhausen in 1993. He has served in juries of international choir and choral composition competitions Miškinis has led choral performances and given lectures in Europe, Ukraine and the U.S..

Miškinis taught at the Lithuanian Academy of Music and Theatre, as a lecturer from 1985, as associate professor from 1995, and as professor of choral conducting from 2002. He is president of the Lithuanian Choral Union, and the artistic director and chief conductor of the All-Lithuanian Choir Festival.

== Compositions ==
Miškinis wrote his first composition in 1977, but turned to composing for Ąžuoliukas in the mid 1980s. His compositions draw on characteristics of Lithuanian folk music. They are basically tonal, but use advanced techniques such as the overlay of harmonies, clusters and repetition. Many works are set to Latin texts which he regards as a universal language. His setting O salutaris hostia, written in 1991 and published by Carus-Verlag in 2001, became an international choral standard.

As of 2020, he has composed and recorded over 700 pieces, both religious and secular. In the United States he has composed works for The University of Louisville Collegiate Chorale and the Golden Gate Men's Chorus (San Francisco, CA). His choral compositions have been published in Lithuania, but also internationally, by publishers including Schott (Germany), A Coeur Joie (France), Astrum, Earthsongs and Santa Barbara Music Publishing (U.S.), Edition Ferrimontana (Italy), and Ediciones Musicale (Spain).
