= 2019 Auburn Tigers football team =

American college football season

2019 Auburn Tigers football

Outback Bowl, L 24–31 vs. Minnesota
- Conference: Southeastern Conference
- Western Division

Ranking
- Coaches: No. 14
- AP: No. 14
- Record: 9–4 (5–3 SEC)
- Head coach: Gus Malzahn (7th season)
- Offensive coordinator: Kenny Dillingham (1st season)
- Defensive coordinator: Kevin Steele (4th season)
- Home stadium: Jordan–Hare Stadium

Uniform
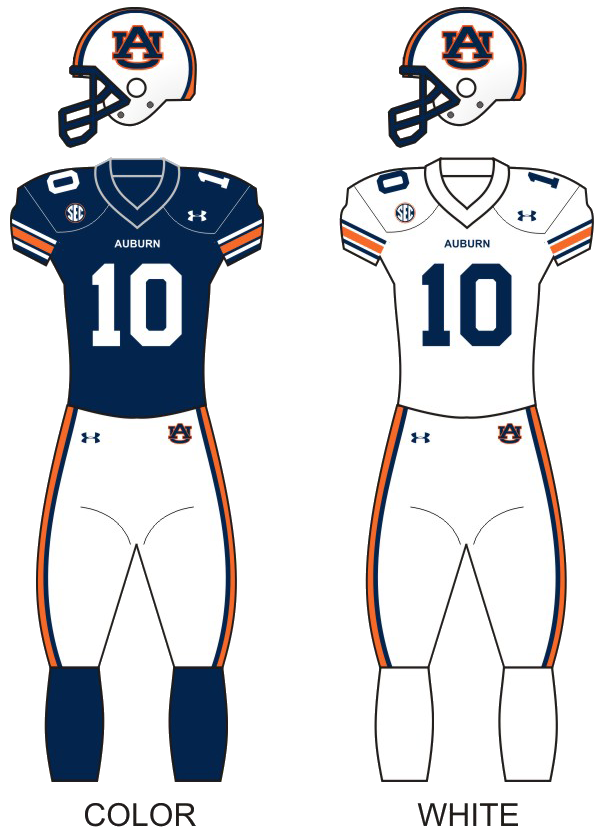

2019 Southeastern Conference football standings
	Conf.			Overall
Team	W		L	W		L
Eastern Division
No. 4 Georgia x	7	–	1	12	–	2
No. 6 Florida	6	–	2	11	–	2
Tennessee *	5	–	3	8	–	5
Kentucky	3	–	5	8	–	5
Missouri *	3	–	5	6	–	6
South Carolina	3	–	5	4	–	8
Vanderbilt	1	–	7	3	–	9
Western Division
No. 1 LSU x$#^	8	–	0	15	–	0
No. 8 Alabama	6	–	2	11	–	2
No. 14 Auburn	5	–	3	9	–	4
Texas A&M	4	–	4	8	–	5
Mississippi State	3	–	5	6	–	7
Ole Miss	2	–	6	4	–	8
Arkansas	0	–	8	2	–	10
Championship: LSU 37, Georgia 10
# – College Football Playoff champion; ^ – College Football Playoff participant; $ – Conference champion; x – Division champion/co-champions; * – Tennessee vacated all wins due to NCAA violations. Missouri was ineligible for postseason due to NCAA sanctions.; Rankings from AP Poll

The 2019 Auburn Tigers football team represented Auburn University in the 2019 NCAA Division I FBS football season. The Tigers played their home games at Jordan–Hare Stadium in Auburn, Alabama, and competed in the Western Division of the Southeastern Conference (SEC). They were led by seventh-year head coach Gus Malzahn.

== Offseason ==
=== Offseason departures ===
Three Auburn players with remaining eligibility declared early for the 2019 NFL draft. In addition, 17 seniors from the 2018 team graduated.

2019 Auburn offseason departures
Name	Pos.	Height	Weight	Year	Hometown	Notes
Jamel Dean	DB	6'2	208	Junior	Cocoa, FL	Declared for 2019 NFL draft
Jarrett Stidham	QB	6'3	215	Junior	Stephenville, TX	Declared for 2019 NFL draft
Darius Slayton	WR	6'2	190	Junior	Norcross, GA	Declared for 2019 NFL draft
Andrew Williams	DT	6'4	286	Senior	McDonough, GA	Graduated
Deshaun Davis	LB	5'11	233	Senior	Prichard, AL	Graduated
Chandler Cox	RB	6'1	242	Senior	Apopka, FL	Graduated
Dontavius Russell	DT	6'3	320	Senior	Carrollton, GA	Graduated
Ryan Davis	WR	5'9	185	Senior	St. Petersburg, FL	Graduated
Montavious Atkinson	LB	6'1	219	Senior	Fairburn, GA	Graduated
Darrell Williams	LB	6'2	240	Senior	Hoover, AL	Graduated
Devin Adams	QB	6'3	239	Senior	Mobile, AL	Graduated
Tucker Brown	TE	6'3	289	Senior	Trussville, AL	Graduated
Chase Cramer	RB	5'10	198	Senior	Orlando, FL	Graduated
Jaunta'vius Johnson	DT	6'2	326	Senior	Lincoln, AL	Graduated
Griffin King	WR	5'10	179	Senior	Atlanta, GA	Graduated
Ryan Meneely	OL	6'2	303	Senior	McDonough, GA	Graduated
Robert Muschamp	TE	6'1	240	Senior	Rome, GA	Graduated
Ian Shannon	K	6'3	236	Senior	Marietta, GA	Graduated
C.J. Tolbert	RB	5'7	199	Senior	Dadeville, AL	Graduated
Andrew Williams	DT	6'4	286	Senior	McDonough, GA	Graduated

=== Recruits ===
The Tigers signed a total of 21 recruits.

College recruiting (2019)
Name	Hometown	School	Height	Weight	Commit date
Bo Nix; QB	Pinson, Alabama	Pinson Valley High School	6 ft 2 in (1.88 m)	190 lb (86 kg)	Jan 10, 2018
Bo Nix; QB	Recruit ratings: Scout: Rivals: 247Sports: ESPN: (86)				
Jaylin Simpson; DB	Saint Simons Island, Georgia	Frederica Academy	5 ft 11 in (1.80 m)	165 lb (75 kg)	Apr 30, 2018
Jaylin Simpson; DB	Recruit ratings: Scout: Rivals: 247Sports: ESPN: (80)				
Owen Pappoe; LB	Loganville, Georgia	Grayson High School	6 ft 1 in (1.85 m)	202 lb (92 kg)	May 1, 2018
Owen Pappoe; LB	Recruit ratings: Scout: Rivals: 247Sports: ESPN: (91)				
Tyler Fromm; TE	Warner Robins, Georgia	Warner Robins High School	6 ft 4 in (1.93 m)	215 lb (98 kg)	May 5, 2018
Tyler Fromm; TE	Recruit ratings: Scout: Rivals: 247Sports: ESPN: (79)				
Luke Deal; TE	Greenwood, South Carolina	Emerald High School	6 ft 5 in (1.96 m)	235 lb (107 kg)	May 28, 2018
Luke Deal; TE	Recruit ratings: Scout: Rivals: 247Sports: ESPN: (80)				
Ja'Varrius Johnson; WR	Trussville, Alabama	Hewitt-Trussville High School	5 ft 9 in (1.75 m)	156 lb (71 kg)	Jun 8, 2018
Ja'Varrius Johnson; WR	Recruit ratings: Scout: Rivals: 247Sports: ESPN: (80)				
Jaren Handy; DL	Hattiesburg, Mississippi	Hattiesburg High School	6 ft 5 in (1.96 m)	262 lb (119 kg)	Jun 18, 2018
Jaren Handy; DL	Recruit ratings: Scout: Rivals: 247Sports: ESPN: (84)				
Jashawn Sheffield; WR	Saint Simons Island, Georgia	Frederica Academy	6 ft 2 in (1.88 m)	175 lb (79 kg)	Jun 23, 2018
Jashawn Sheffield; WR	Recruit ratings: Scout: Rivals: 247Sports: ESPN: (83)				
Justin Osborne; OL	Flower Mound, Texas	Marcus High School	6 ft 5 in (1.96 m)	300 lb (140 kg)	Jun 24, 2018
Justin Osborne; OL	Recruit ratings: Scout: Rivals: 247Sports: ESPN: (78)				
Keiondre Jones; OL	Hogansville, Georgia	Callaway High School	6 ft 3 in (1.91 m)	340 lb (150 kg)	Jul 14, 2018
Keiondre Jones; OL	Recruit ratings: Scout: Rivals: 247Sports: ESPN: (85)				
Colby Wooden; DB/DE	Lawrenceville, Georgia	Archer High School	6 ft 4 in (1.93 m)	231 lb (105 kg)	Aug 16, 2018
Colby Wooden; DB/DE	Recruit ratings: Scout: Rivals: 247Sports: ESPN: (79)				
Zion Puckett; DB	Griffin, Georgia	Spalding High School	6 ft 0 in (1.83 m)	195 lb (88 kg)	Aug 17, 2018
Zion Puckett; DB	Recruit ratings: Scout: Rivals: 247Sports: ESPN: (84)				
Cam'Ron Kelly; S	Chesapeake, Virginia	Oscar Smith High School	6 ft 1 in (1.85 m)	200 lb (91 kg)	Aug 22, 2018
Cam'Ron Kelly; S	Recruit ratings: Scout: Rivals: 247Sports: ESPN: (82)				
Nehemiah Pritchett; S	Jackson, Alabama	Jackson High School	6 ft 0 in (1.83 m)	170 lb (77 kg)	Nov 7, 2018
Nehemiah Pritchett; S	Recruit ratings: Scout: Rivals: 247Sports: ESPN: (78)				
DJ Williams; RB	Sebring, Florida	Sebring High School	5 ft 10 in (1.78 m)	205 lb (93 kg)	Dec 19, 2018
DJ Williams; RB	Recruit ratings: Scout: Rivals: 247Sports: ESPN: (81)				
Derick Hall; LB	Gulfport, Mississippi	Gulfport High School	6 ft 4 in (1.93 m)	222 lb (101 kg)	Dec 19, 2018
Derick Hall; LB	Recruit ratings: Scout: Rivals: 247Sports: ESPN: (83)				
Kameron Brown; LB	Sugar Hill, Georgia	Lanier High School	6 ft 0 in (1.83 m)	230 lb (100 kg)	Jan 22, 2019
Kameron Brown; LB	Recruit ratings: Scout: Rivals: 247Sports: ESPN: (70)				
Kamaar Bell; OL	Moultrie, Georgia	Colquitt County High School	6 ft 3 in (1.91 m)	317 lb (144 kg)	Feb 6, 2019
Kamaar Bell; OL	Recruit ratings: Scout: Rivals: 247Sports: ESPN: (80)				
Mark-Antony Richards; RB	Palm Beach, Florida	Wellington High School	6 ft 1 in (1.85 m)	187 lb (85 kg)	Feb 6, 2019
Mark-Antony Richards; RB	Recruit ratings: Scout: Rivals: 247Sports: ESPN: (83)				
Charles Moore; DE	Louisville, Mississippi	Louisville High School	6 ft 3 in (1.91 m)	270 lb (120 kg)	Feb 6, 2019
Charles Moore; DE	Recruit ratings: Scout: Rivals: 247Sports: ESPN: (84)				
Octavius Brothers Jr. LB	Rockledge, Florida	Rockledge High School	6 ft 2 in (1.88 m)	228 lb (103 kg)	Feb 6, 2019
Octavius Brothers Jr. LB	Recruit ratings: Scout: Rivals: 247Sports: ESPN: (78)				
Overall recruit ranking: Rivals: 13 247Sports: 11 ESPN: 12
Note: In many cases, Scout, Rivals, 247Sports, On3, and ESPN may conflict in their listings of height and weight.; In these cases, the average was taken. ESPN grades are on a 100-point scale.; Sources: "Rivals commits". Rivals.; "ESPN commits". ESPN.; "2019 Team Ranking". Rivals.com.; "247Sports commits". 247Sports.

=== Returning starters ===
Offense
Player	Class	Position
Kam Martin	Senior	Running back
JaTarvious Whitlow	RS Sophomore	Running back
Spencer Nigh	Senior	Tight end
Sal Cannella	Senior	Wide receiver
Prince Tega Wanogho	RS Senior	Left tackle
Marquel Harrell	RS Senior	Left guard
Kaleb Kim	RS Senior	Center
Mike Horton	RS Senior	Right guard
Jack Driscoll	RS Senior	Right tackle

Defense
Player	Class	Position
Nick Coe	RS Junior	Linebacker
Derrick Brown	Senior	Defensive tackle
Marlon Davidson	Senior	Defensive end
Noah Igbinoghene	Sophomore	Cornerback
Javaris Davis	RS Senior	Cornerback
Jeremiah Dinson	RS Senior	Free safety
Daniel Thomas	Senior	Strong safety

Special teams
Player	Class	Position
Anders Carlson	RS Sophomore	Kicker
Bill Taylor	RS Sophomore	Long snapper
Noah Igbinoghene	Junior	Kick returner

== Spring game ==
The A-Day spring game was held on Saturday, April 13. The Orange Team (first team) defeated the Blue Team (second team) 28–10. Both quarterbacks competing for the starting position, Bo Nix and Joey Gatewood, had strong performances. Wide receiver Seth Williams was named Offensive MVP, Derrick Brown was named Defensive MVP, and Anders Carlson was named Special Teams MVP.

2019 Auburn A-Day Game

Quarter	1	2	3	4	Total
Orange	7	21	0	0	28
Blue	10	0	0	0	10

at Jordan-Hare Stadium • Auburn, Alabama

- Date: April 13, 2019
- Game time: 3:00 p.m.
- Game attendance: 41,489
- TV announcers (SEC Network): Dave LaMont (play-by-play), Rod Gilmore (analyst)

== Preseason ==
=== Award watch lists ===
Listed in the order that they were released

Award	Player	Position	Year
Lott Trophy	Derrick Brown	DT	SR
Bednarik Award	Derrick Brown	DT	SR
Doak Walker Award	Kam Martin	RB	SR
Rimington Trophy	Kaleb Kim	C	SR
Outland Trophy	Derrick Brown	DT	SR
Outland Trophy	Prince Tega Wanogho	DT	SR
Bronko Nagurski Trophy	Derrick Brown	DT	SR
Bronko Nagurski Trophy	Nick Coe	LB	JR
Dodd Trophy	Gus Malzahn	HC	--
Paul Hornung Award	Noah Igbinoghene	CB	SO
Earl Campbell Tyler Rose Award	Kam Martin	RB	SR
Ted Hendricks Award	Nick Coe	LB	JR
Ted Hendricks Award	Marlon Davidson	DE	SR

=== SEC media poll ===
The SEC media poll was released on July 19, 2019, with the Tigers predicted to finish in fourth place in the West Division.

=== Preseason All-SEC teams ===
The Tigers had eight players selected to the preseason all-SEC teams.

Offense

1st team

Prince Tega Wanogho – OL

3rd team

JaTarvious Whitlow – RB

Defense

1st team

Derrick Brown – DL

2nd team

Nick Coe – DL

Marlon Davidson – DL

3rd team

Daniel Thomas - DB

Specialists

2nd team

Anders Carlson - K

3rd team

Arryn Siposs - P

== Schedule ==
Date	Time	Opponent	Rank	Site	TV	Result	Attendance
August 31	6:30 p.m.	vs. No. 11 Oregon*	No. 16	AT&T Stadium; Arlington, TX (Advocare Classic / College GameDay)	ABC	W 27–21	60,662
September 7	6:30 p.m.	Tulane*	No. 10	Jordan–Hare Stadium; Auburn, AL (rivalry)	ESPN2	W 24–6	85,317
September 14	6:00 p.m.	Kent State*^{†}	No. 8	Jordan–Hare Stadium; Auburn, AL	ESPN2	W 55–16	84,542
September 21	2:30 p.m.	at No. 17 Texas A&M	No. 8	Kyle Field; College Station, TX (SEC Nation)	CBS	W 28–20	101,681
September 28	6:00 p.m.	Mississippi State	No. 7	Jordan–Hare Stadium; Auburn, AL (SEC Nation)	ESPN	W 56–23	87,451
October 5	2:30 p.m.	at No. 10 Florida	No. 7	Ben Hill Griffin Stadium; Gainesville, FL (rivalry / College GameDay)	CBS	L 13–24	90,584
October 19	11:00 a.m.	at Arkansas	No. 11	Donald W. Reynolds Razorback Stadium; Fayetteville, AR	SECN	W 51–10	54,619
October 26	2:30 p.m.	at No. 2 LSU	No. 9	Tiger Stadium; Baton Rouge, LA (Tiger Bowl / SEC Nation)	CBS	L 20–23	102,160
November 2	6:00 p.m.	Ole Miss	No. 11	Jordan–Hare Stadium; Auburn, AL (rivalry)	ESPN	W 20–14	87,457
November 16	2:30 p.m.	No. 4 Georgia	No. 12	Jordan–Hare Stadium; Auburn, AL (Deep South's Oldest Rivalry)	CBS	L 14–21	87,451
November 23	11:00 a.m.	Samford*	No. 15	Jordan–Hare Stadium; Auburn, AL	SECN	W 52–0	80,692
November 30	2:30 p.m.	No. 5 Alabama	No. 15	Jordan–Hare Stadium; Auburn, AL (Iron Bowl / SEC Nation)	CBS	W 48–45	87,451
January 1, 2020	12:00 p.m.	vs. No. 18 Minnesota*	No. 12	Raymond James Stadium; Tampa, FL (Outback Bowl)	ESPN	L 24–31	45,652
*Non-conference game; ^{†}Homecoming; Rankings from AP Poll and CFP Rankings after November 5 released prior to game; All times are in Central time

Schedule source:

== Personnel ==
=== Coaching staff ===
Name	Position	Alma mater	Year entering
Gus Malzahn	Head coach	Henderson State	7th
Rodney Garner	Associate head coach/defensive line	Auburn	5th
Kevin Steele	Defensive coordinator	Tennessee	4th
Kenny Dillingham	Offensive coordinator/quarterbacks	Arizona State	1st
Kodi Burns	Passing game coordinator/wide receivers	Auburn	2nd
Wesley McGriff	Secondary Coach	Savannah State	2nd
Travis Williams	Linebackers coach	Auburn	2nd
Larry Porter	Tight Ends/recruiting coordinator	Memphis	1st
Cadillac Williams	Running backs coach	Auburn	1st
J.B. Grimes	Offensive line coach	Henderson College	2nd
Ryan Russell	Strength Coach	West Liberty State	5th

== Game summaries ==
=== Vs. Oregon ===
2019 Advocare Classic
#11 Oregon Ducks vs. #16 Auburn Tigers – Game summary

Quarter	1	2	3	4	Total
No. 11 Oregon	14	0	7	0	21
No. 16 Auburn	3	3	7	14	27

at AT&T Stadium • Arlington, Texas

- Date: August 31, 2019
- Game time: 6:44 p.m.
- Game weather: Indoors
- Game attendance: 60,662
- Referee: Reggie Smith
- TV announcers (ABC): Chris Fowler (play-by-play), Kirk Herbstreit (analyst), Maria Taylor (sideline reporter)

Game information

First Quarter

- ORE – C. J. Verdell 1 yd rush (Camden Lewis kick), 10:13 (ORE 7–0)
- AUB – Anders Carlson 40 yd field goal, 3:17 (ORE 7–3)
- ORE – Spencer Webb 20 yd pass from Justin Herbert (Camden Lewis kick), 2:11 (ORE 14–3)

Second Quarter

- AUB – Anders Carlson 25 yd field goal, 4:41 (ORE 14–6)

Third Quarter

- ORE – Darrian Felix 6 yd rush (Adam Stack kick), 9:23 (ORE 21–6)
- AUB – Eli Stove 11 yd pass from Bo Nix (Anders Carlson kick), 4:20 (ORE 21–13)

Fourth Quarter

- AUB – Joey Gatewood 1 yd rush (Anders Carlson kick), 9:48 (ORE 21–20)
- AUB – Seth Williams 26 yd pass from Bo Nix (Anders Carlson kick), 0:09 (AUB 27–21)

Top Passers

- ORE – Justin Herbert 28–37, 242 yds, 1 TD
- AUB – Bo Nix 13–31, 177 yds, 2 TD, 2 INT

Top Rushers

- ORE – C. J. Verdell 14 rushes, 76 yds, 1 TD
- AUB – JaTarvious Whitlow 24 rushes, 110 yds

Top Receivers

- ORE – Jaylon Redd 9 receptions, 64 yds
- AUB – Seth Williams 4 receptions, 41 yds, 1 TD

=== Tulane ===
Tulane Green Wave at #10 Auburn Tigers – Game summary

Quarter	1	2	3	4	Total
Tulane	3	3	0	0	6
No. 10 Auburn	0	14	7	3	24

at Jordan–Hare Stadium • Auburn, Alabama

- Date: September 7, 2019
- Game time: 6:35 p.m.
- Game weather: Temperature: 89° • Wind: NW 4 mph • Weather: Sunny
- Game attendance: 85,317
- Referee: Lee Hedrick
- TV announcers (ESPN2): Jason Benetti (play-by-play), Rod Gilmore (analyst), Quint Kessenich (sideline reporter)

Game information

First quarter

- (10:13) TULN FG – Merek Glover 44-yard field goal
  Tulane 3–0; Drive: 9 plays, 48 yards, 3:17

Second quarter

- (12:54) AUB TD – Will Hastings 31-yard pass from Bo Nix, Anders Carlson kick
  Auburn 7–3; Drive: 5 plays, 66 yards, 1:48
- (09:37) AUB TD – Eli Stove 4-yard rush, Anders Carlson kick
  Auburn 14–3; Drive: 7 plays, 58 yards, 2:11
- (00:40) TULN FG – Merek Glover 32-yard field goal
  Auburn 14–6; Drive: 8 plays, 40 yards, 1:54

Third quarter

- (01:51) AUB TD – JaTarvious Whitlow 14-yard rush, Anders Carlson kick
  Auburn 21–6; Drive: 11 plays, 82 yards, 5:20

Fourth quarter

- (12:36) AUB FG – Anders Carlson 22-yard field goal
  Auburn 24–6; Drive: 10 plays, 59 yards, 3:44

Top Passers

- TUL – Justin McMillan 10–33, 103 yds, 1 INT
- AUB – Bo Nix 19–37, 207 yds, 1 TD

Top Rushers

- TUL – Justin McMillan 7 rushes, 54 yds
- AUB – JaTarvious Whitlow 23 rushes, 96 yds, 1 TD

Top Receivers

- TUL – Darnell Mooney 3 receptions, 48 yds
- AUB – Eli Stove 7 receptions, 27 yds

=== Kent State ===
Kent State Golden Flashes at #8 Auburn Tigers – Game summary

Quarter	1	2	3	4	Total
Kent State	3	7	0	6	16
No. 8 Auburn	14	10	14	17	55

at Jordan–Hare Stadium • Auburn, Alabama

- Date: September 14, 2019
- Game time: 6:05 p.m.
- Game weather: Temperature: 88° • Wind: NE 9 mph • Weather: Partly Cloudy
- Game attendance: 84,542
- Referee: David Smith
- TV announcers (ESPN2): Anish Shroff (play-by-play), Ahmad Brooks (analyst), Kris Budden (sideline reporter)

Game information

First Quarter

- KSU – Matthew Trickett 21 yd field goal, 8:42 (KSU 3–0)
- AUB – JaTarvious Whitlow 3 yd run (Anders Carlson kick), 5:47 (AUB 7–3)
- AUB – Kam Martin 35 yd run (Anders Carlson kick), 0:11 (AUB 14–3)

Second Quarter

- KSU – Isaiah McCoy 53 yd pass from Dustin Crum (Matthew Trickett kick), 10:47 (AUB 14–10)
- AUB – Bo Nix 1 yd run (Anders Carlson kick), 8:16 (AUB 21–10)
- AUB – Anders Carlson 45 yd field goal, 0:00 (AUB 24–10)

Third Quarter

- AUB – JaTarvious Whitlow 16 yd run (Anders Carlson kick), 12:02 (AUB 31–10)
- AUB – Eli Stove 49 yd pass from Bo Nix (Anders Carlson kick), 5:59 (AUB 38–10)

Fourth Quarter

- AUB – Anders Carlson 37 yd field goal, 14:55 (AUB 41–10)
- KSU – Kavious Price 15 yd pass from Woody Barrett (2 pt conversion failed), 12:36 (KSU 41–16)
- AUB – Joey Gatewood 2 yd run (Sage Ledbetter kick), 8:49 (AUB 48–16)
- AUB – Joey Gatewood 2 yd run (Sage Ledbetter kick), 2:27 (AUB 55–16)

Top Passers

- KSU – Dustin Crum 15–24, 198 yds, 1 TD
- AUB – Bo Nix 12–16, 161 yds, 1 TD

Top Rushers

- KSU – Dustin Crum 11 rushes, 30 yds
- AUB – JaTarvious Whitlow 17 rushes, 135 yds, 2 TD

Top Receivers

- KSU – Isaiah McCoy 4 receptions, 85 yds, 1 TD
- AUB – Eli Stove 6 receptions, 88 yds, 1 TD

=== At Texas A&M ===
#8 Auburn Tigers at #17 Texas A&M Aggies – Game summary

Quarter	1	2	3	4	Total
No. 8 Auburn	14	0	7	7	28
No. 17 Texas A&M	0	3	0	17	20

at Kyle Field • College Station, Texas

- Date: September 21, 2019
- Game time: 2:41 p.m.
- Game weather: Temperature: 91° • Wind: S/SE 12 • Weather: 54% Humidity
- Game attendance: 101,681
- Referee: John McDaid
- TV announcers (CBS): Carter Blackburn (play-by-play), Rick Neuheisel and Aaron Murray (analysts), John Schriffen (sideline reporter)

Game information

First Quarter

- AUB – Anthony Schwartz 57 yd run (Anders Carlson kick), 13:19 (AUB 7–0)
- AUB – John Shenker 6 yd pass from Joey Gatewood (Anders Carlson kick), 0:39 (AUB 14–0)

Second Quarter

- TA&M – Seth Small 33 yd field goal, 12:59 (AUB 14–3)

Third Quarter

- AUB – Seth Williams 9 yd pass from Bo Nix (Anders Carlson kick), 12:05 (AUB 21–3)

Fourth Quarter

- TA&M – Quartney Davis 27 yd pass from Kellen Mond (Seth Small kick), 14:28 (AUB 21–10)
- AUB – JaTarvious Whitlow 8 yd run (Anders Carlson kick), 8:27 (AUB 28–10)
- TA&M – Seth Small 23 yd field goal, 5:36 (AUB 28–13)
- TA&M – Ainias Smith 15 yd pass from Kellen Mond (Seth Small kick), 2:12 (AUB 28–20)

Top Passers

- AUB – Bo Nix 12–20, 100 yds, 1 TD
- TA&M – Kellen Mond 31–49, 335 yds, 2 TD

Top Rushers

- AUB – JaTarvious Whitlow 18 rushes, 67 yds, 1 TD
- TA&M – Kellen Mond 9 rushes, 26 yds

Top Receivers

- AUB – Seth Williams 4 receptions, 47 yds, 1 TD
- TA&M – Jhamon Ausbon 8 receptions, 111 yds

=== Mississippi State ===
Mississippi State Bulldogs at #7 Auburn Tigers – Game summary

Quarter	1	2	3	4	Total
Mississippi State	6	3	7	7	23
No. 7 Auburn	21	21	7	7	56

at Jordan–Hare Stadium • Auburn, Alabama

- Date: September 28, 2019
- Game time: 6:10 p.m.
- Game weather: Temperature: 90° • Wind: NE 5 mph • Weather: Sunny
- Game attendance: 87,451
- Referee: James Carter
- TV announcers (ESPN): Sean McDonough (play-by-play), Todd Blackledge (analyst), Holly Rowe (sideline reporter)

Game information

First Quarter

- AUB – JaTarvious Whitlow 30 yd run (Anders Carlson kick), 12:55 (AUB 7–0)
- AUB – Bo Nix 9 yd run (Anders Carlson kick), 9:46 (AUB 14–0)
- AUB – Anthony Schwartz 13 yd run (Anders Carlson kick), 8:59 (AUB 21–0)
- MSU – Stephen Guidry 9 yd pass from Garrett Shrader (Jace Christmann kick failed), 2:20 (AUB 21–6)

Second Quarter

- AUB – JaTarvious Whitlow 3 yd run (Anders Carlson kick), 13:18 (AUB 28–6)
- MSU – Jace Christmann 27 yd field goal, 7:55 (AUB 28–9)
- AUB – Seth Williams 39 yd pass from Bo Nix (Anders Carlson kick), 5:33 (AUB 35–9)
- AUB – JaTarvious Whitlow 3 yd run (Anders Carlson kick), 0:12 (AUB 42–9)

Third Quarter

- AUB – Seth Williams 32 yd pass from Bo Nix (Anders Carlson kick), 13:28 (AUB 49–9)
- MSU – Osirus Mitchell 21 yd pass from Garrett Shrader (Jace Christmann kick), 2:13 (AUB 49–16)

Fourth Quarter

- AUB – Kam Martin 7 yd run (Anders Carlson kick), 14:16 (AUB 56–16)
- MSU – Garrett Shrader 7 yd run (Jace Christmann kick), 0:50 (AUB 56–23)

Top Passers

- MSU – Garrett Shrader 12–23, 209 yds, 2 TD
- AUB – Bo Nix 16–21, 335 yds, 2 TD

Top Rushers

- MSU – Garrett Shrader 16 rushes, 89 yds, 1 TD
- AUB – Bo Nix 7 rushes, 56 yds, 1 TD

Top Receivers

- MSU – Farrod Green 3 receptions, 69 yds
- AUB – Seth Williams 8 receptions, 161 yds, 2 TD

=== At Florida ===
#7 Auburn Tigers at #10 Florida Gators – Game summary

Quarter	1	2	3	4	Total
No. 7 Auburn	6	7	0	0	13
No. 10 Florida	7	10	0	7	24

at Ben Hill Griffin Stadium • Gainesville, Florida

- Date: October 5, 2019
- Game time: 2:39 p.m.
- Game weather: Temperature: 88° • Wind: ENE 12 • Weather: 54% Humidity, Partly Cloudy
- Game attendance: 90,584
- Referee: Marc Curles
- TV announcers (CBS): Brad Nessler (play-by-play), Gary Danielson (analyst), Jamie Erdahl (sideline reporter)

Game information

First Quarter

- FLA – Freddie Swain 64 yd pass from Kyle Trask (Evan McPherson kick), 13:12 (FLA 7–0)
- AUB – Anders Carlson 48 yd field goal, 7:11 (FLA 7–3)
- AUB – Anders Carlson 39 yd field goal, 3:01 (FLA 7–6)

Second Quarter

- FLA – Josh Hammond 13 yd pass from Kyle Trask (Evan McPherson kick), 13:28 (FLA 14–6)
- AUB – Seth Williams 32 yd pass from Bo Nix (Anders Carlson kick), 10:23 (FLA 14–13)
- FLA – Evan McPherson 41 yd field goal, 5:49 (FLA 17–13)

Fourth Quarter

- FLA – La'Mical Perine 88 yd run (Evan McPherson kick), 9:04 (FLA 24–13)

Top Passers

- AUB – Bo Nix 11–27, 145 yds, 1 TD, 3 INT
- FLA – Kyle Trask 19–31, 234 yds, 2 TD

Top Rushers

- AUB – JaTarvious Whitlow 18 rushes, 81 yds
- FLA – La'Mical Perine 14 rushes, 130 yds, 1 TD

Top Receivers

- AUB – Seth Williams 4 receptions, 79 yds, 1 TD
- FLA – Kyle Pitts 8 receptions, 65 yds

=== At Arkansas ===
#11 Auburn Tigers at Arkansas Razorbacks – Game summary

Quarter	1	2	3	4	Total
No. 11 Auburn	17	0	14	20	51
Arkansas	0	0	10	0	10

at Donald W. Reynolds Razorback Stadium • Fayetteville, Arkansas

- Date: October 19, 2019
- Game time: 11:03 a.m.
- Game weather: Temperature: 56° • Wind: SE 3 mph • Weather: Partly Cloudy
- Game attendance: 54,619
- Referee: Lee Hedrick
- TV announcers (SEC Network): Taylor Zarzour (play-by-play), Matt Stinchcomb (analyst), Alyssa Lang (sideline reporter)

Game information

First Quarter

- AUB – Bo Nix 4 yd run (Anders Carlson kick), 12:38 (AUB 7–0)
- AUB – Shaun Shivers 6 yd run (Anders Carlson kick), 10:48 (AUB 14–0)
- AUB – Anders Carlson 44 yd field goal, 0:51 (AUB 17–0)

Third Quarter

- ARK – Connor Limpert 28 yd field goal, 5:53 (AUB 17–3)
- AUB – Seth Williams 48 yd pass from Bo Nix (Anders Carlson kick), 4:19 (AUB 24–3)
- AUB – Anthony Schwartz 28 yd pass from Bo Nix (Anders Carlson kick), 3:57 (AUB 31–3)
- ARK – Cheyenne O'Grady 45 yd pass from Ben Hicks (Connor Limpert kick), 0:14 (AUB 31–10)

Fourth Quarter

- AUB – Seth Williams 15 yd pass from Bo Nix (Anders Carlson kick failed), 11:54 (AUB 37–10)
- AUB – Jay Jay Wilson 17 yd pass from Joey Gatewood (Anders Carlson kick), 7:03 (AUB 44–10)
- AUB – Harold Joiner 32 yd run (Anders Carlson kick), 2:27 (AUB 51–10)

Top Passers

- AUB – Bo Nix 12–17, 176 yds, 3 TD
- ARK – Ben Hicks 19–39, 182 yds, 1 TD, 1 INT

Top Rushers

- AUB – Kam Martin 10 rushes, 84 yds
- ARK – Rakeem Boyd 13 rushes, 39 yds

Top Receivers

- AUB – Anthony Schwartz 6 receptions, 73 yds, 1 TD
- ARK – Cheyenne O'Grady 7 receptions, 72 yds, 1 TD

=== At LSU ===
#9 Auburn Tigers at #2 LSU Tigers – Game summary

Quarter	1	2	3	4	Total
No. 9 Auburn	3	7	3	7	20
No. 2 LSU	0	10	6	7	23

at Tiger Stadium • Baton Rouge, Louisiana

- Date: October 26, 2019
- Game time: 2:39 p.m.
- Game weather: Temperature: 61° • Wind: W 10 mph • Weather: Cloudy, 77% Humidity
- Game attendance: 102,160
- Referee: Ken Williamson
- TV announcers (CBS): Brad Nessler (play-by-play), Gary Danielson (analyst), Jamie Erdahl (sideline reporter)

Game information

First Quarter

- AUB – Anders Carlson 30 yd field goal, 8:39 (AUB 3–0)

Second Quarter

- LSU – Terrace Marshall Jr. 20 yd pass from Joe Burrow (Cade York kick), 12:28 (LSU 7–3)
- AUB – Bo Nix 1 yd run (Anders Carlson kick), 3:06 (AUB 10–7)
- LSU – Cade York 20 yd field goal, 0:33 (TIE 10–10)

Third Quarter

- AUB – Anders Carlson 23 yd field goal, 11:42 (AUB 13–10)
- LSU – Clyde Edwards-Helaire (Cade York kick failed), 4:58 (LSU 16–13)

Fourth Quarter

- LSU – Joe Burrow 7 yd run (Cade York kick), 13:29 (LSU 23–13)
- AUB – Seth Williams 5 yd pass from Bo Nix (Anders Carlson kick), 2:32 (LSU 23–20)

Top Passers

- AUB – Bo Nix 15–35, 157 yds, 1 TD, 1 INT
- LSU – Joe Burrow 32–42, 321 yds, 1 TD, 1 INT

Top Rushers

- AUB – DJ Williams 13 rushes, 130 yds
- LSU – Clyde Edwards-Helaire 26 rushes, 136 yds, 1 TD

Top Receivers

- AUB – Seth Williams 4 receptions, 65 yds, 1 TD
- LSU – Ja'Marr Chase 8 receptions, 123 yds

=== Ole Miss ===
Ole Miss Rebels at #11 Auburn Tigers – Game summary

Quarter	1	2	3	4	Total
Ole Miss	0	7	0	7	14
No. 11 Auburn	0	10	10	0	20

at Jordan–Hare Stadium • Auburn, Alabama

- Date: November 2, 2019
- Game time: 6:05 p.m.
- Game weather: Temperature: 55° • Wind: NW 9 mph • Weather: Sunny
- Game attendance: 87,457
- Referee: John McDaid
- TV announcers (ESPN): Sean McDonough (play-by-play), Todd Blackledge (analyst), Holly Rowe (sideline reporter)

Game information

Second Quarter

- AUB – Anders Carlson 20 yd field goal, 6:03 (AUB 3–0)
- AUB – D.J. Williams 1 yd run (Anders Carlson kick), 2:34 (AUB 10–0)
- MISS – John Rhys Plumlee 4 yd run (Luke Logan kick), 0:44 (AUB 10–7)

Third Quarter

- AUB – Bo Nix 1 yd run (Anders Carlson kick), 10:09 (AUB 17–7)
- AUB – Anders Carlson 38 yd field goal, 4:15 (AUB 20–7)

Fourth Quarter

- MISS – Snoop Conner 1 yd run (Luke Logan kick), 5:45 (AUB 20–14)

Top Passers

- MISS – John Rhys Plumlee 11–21, 86 yds, 1 INT
- AUB – Bo Nix 30–44, 340 yds

Top Rushers

- MISS – John Rhys Plumlee 17 rushes, 92 yds, 1 TD
- AUB – D.J. Williams 23 rushes, 93 yds, 1 TD

Top Receivers

- MISS – Jerrion Ealy 4 receptions, 16 yds
- AUB – Anthony Schwartz 9 receptions, 89 yds

=== Georgia ===
#4 Georgia Bulldogs at #12 Auburn Tigers – Game summary

Quarter	1	2	3	4	Total
No. 4 Georgia	7	7	7	0	21
No. 12 Auburn	0	0	0	14	14

at Jordan–Hare Stadium • Auburn, Alabama

- Date: November 16, 2019
- Game time: 2:45 p.m.
- Game weather: Temperature: 64° • Wind: N 10 mph • Weather: Sunny
- Game attendance: 87,451
- Referee: John McDaid
- TV announcers (CBS): Brad Nessler (play-by-play), Gary Danielson (analyst), Jamie Erdahl (sideline reporter)

Game information

First Quarter

- UGA – Dominick Blaylock 51 yd pass from Jake Fromm (Rodrigo Blankenship kick), 5:56 (UGA 7–0)

Second Quarter

- UGA – Brian Herrien 5 yd pass from Jake Fromm (Rodrigo Blankenship kick), 0:20 (UGA 14–0)

Third Quarter

- UGA – Eli Wolf 5 yd pass from Jake Fromm (Rodrigo Blankenship kick), 0:13 (UGA 21–0)

Fourth Quarter

- AUB – Eli Stove 3 yd pass from Bo Nix (Anders Carlson kick), 10:04 (UGA 21–7)
- AUB – Bo Nix 2 yd run (Anders Carlson kick), 7:03 (UGA 21–14)

Top Passers

- UGA – Jake Fromm 13–28, 110 yds, 3 TD
- AUB – Bo Nix 30–50, 245 yds, 1 TD

Top Rushers

- UGA – D'Andre Swift 17 rushes, 106 yds
- AUB – Bo Nix 13 rushes, 42 yds, 1 TD

Top Receivers

- UGA – Demetris Robertson 3 receptions, 20 yds
- AUB – Seth Williams 13 receptions, 121 yds

=== Samford ===
Samford Bulldogs at #15 Auburn Tigers – Game summary

Quarter	1	2	3	4	Total
Samford	0	0	0	0	0
No. 15 Auburn	7	24	7	14	52

at Jordan–Hare Stadium • Auburn, Alabama

- Date: November 23, 2019
- Game time: 11:06 a.m.
- Game weather: Temperature: 65° • Wind: S 11 mph • Weather: Rain
- Game attendance: 80,692
- Referee: Marc Curles
- TV announcers (SEC Network): Taylor Zarzour (play-by-play), Matt Stinchcomb (analyst), Alyssa Lang (sideline reporter)

Game information

First Quarter

- AUB – JaTarvious Whitlow 1 yd run (Anders Carlson kick), 8:13 (AUB 7–0)

Second Quarter

- AUB – JaTarvious Whitlow 3 yd run (Anders Carlson kick), 14:08 (AUB 14–0)
- AUB – Harold Joiner 10 yd pass from Bo Nix (Anders Carlson kick), 9:37 (AUB 21–0)
- AUB – Shaun Shivers 4 yd run (Anders Carlson kick), 7:14 (AUB 28–0)
- AUB – Anders Carlson 29 yd field goal, 1:16 (AUB 31–0)

Third Quarter

- AUB – D.J. Williams 2 yd run (Anders Carlson kick), 12:35 (AUB 38–0)

Fourth Quarter

- AUB – Zach Farrar 27 yd pass from Cord Sandberg (Josh Marsh kick), 13:32 (AUB 45–0)
- AUB – Zach Farrar 4 yd pass from Cord Sandberg (Josh Marsh kick), 9:23 (AUB 52–0)

Top Passers

- SAM – Liam Welch 12–23, 66 yds, 2 INT
- AUB – Bo Nix 15–23, 150 yds, 1 TD

Top Rushers

- SAM – Jay Stanton 10 rushes, 19 yds
- AUB – Shaun Shivers 9 rushes, 55 yds, 1 TD

Top Receivers

- SAM – Kendall Watson 3 receptions, 17 yds
- AUB – Seth Williams 4 receptions, 45 yds

=== Alabama ===
#5 Alabama Crimson Tide at #15 Auburn Tigers – Game summary

Quarter	1	2	3	4	Total
No. 5 Alabama	3	28	7	7	45
No. 15 Auburn	7	20	13	8	48

at Jordan–Hare Stadium • Auburn, Alabama

- Date: November 30, 2019
- Game time: 2:39 p.m.
- Game weather: Temperature: 75° • Wind: SW 11 mph • Weather: Sunny
- Game attendance: 87,451
- Referee: Ken Williamson
- TV announcers (CBS): Brad Nessler (play-by-play), Gary Danielson (analyst), Jamie Erdahl (sideline reporter)

Game information

First Quarter

- ALA – Joseph Bulovas 43 yd field goal, 8:27 (ALA 3–0)
- AUB – Bo Nix 7 yd run (Anders Carlson kick), 2:07 (AUB 7–3)

Second Quarter

- ALA – Najee Harris 6 yd run (Joseph Bulovas kick), 10:16 (ALA 10–7)
- AUB – Anders Carlson 43 yd field goal, 7:04 (TIE 10–10)
- AUB – Smoke Monday 29 yd interception return (Anders Carlson kick), 5:36 (AUB 17–10)
- ALA – Jaylen Waddle 98 yd kickoff return (Joseph Bulovas kick), 5:22 (TIE 17–17)
- ALA – Henry Ruggs 3 yd pass from Mac Jones (Joseph Bulovas kick), 4:12 (ALA 24–17)
- AUB – Sal Canella 14 pass from Bo Nix (Anders Carlson kick), 1:06 (TIE 24–24)
- ALA – Jaylen Waddle 58 yd pass from Mac Jones (Joseph Bulovas kick), 0:33 (ALA 31–24)
- AUB – Anders Carlson 53 yd field goal, 0:00 (ALA 31–27)

Third Quarter

- AUB – Anders Carlson 43 yd field goal, 11:49 (ALA 31–30)
- AUB – Zakoby McClain 100 yd interception return (Anders Carlson kick), 6:31 (AUB 37–31)
- ALA – Jaylen Waddle 12 yd pass from Mac Jones (Joseph Bulovas kick), 4:57 (ALA 38–37)
- AUB – Anders Carlson 44 yd field goal, 0:49 (AUB 40–38)

Fourth Quarter

- ALA – Jaylen Waddle 28 yd pass from Mac Jones (Joseph Bulovas kick), 13:44 (ALA 45–40)
- AUB – Shaun Shivers 11 yd run (Shedrick Jackson pass from Bo Nix), 8:08 (AUB 48–45)

Top Passers

- ALA – Mac Jones 26–39, 335 yds, 4 TD, 2 INT
- AUB – Bo Nix 15–30, 173 yds, 1 TD

Top Rushers

- ALA – Najee Harris 27 rushes, 146 yds, 1 TD
- AUB – JaTarvious Whitlow 16 rushes, 114 yds

Top Receivers

- ALA – Henry Ruggs 6 receptions, 99 yds, 1 TD
- AUB – Eli Stove 4 receptions, 31 yds

=== Vs. Minnesota ===
2020 Outback Bowl
#18 Minnesota Golden Gophers vs. #12 Auburn Tigers – Game summary

Quarter	1	2	3	4	Total
No. 18 Minnesota	10	14	0	7	31
No. 12 Auburn	10	7	7	0	24

at Raymond James Stadium • Tampa, Florida

- Date: January 1, 2020
- Game time: 12:00 p.m.
- Game weather: Fair • Temperature: 68 °F (20 °C) • Wind: 3 mph
- Game attendance: 45,652
- Referee: Duane Heydt
- TV announcers (ESPN): Jason Benetti (play-by-play), Rod Gilmore (analyst), Quint Kessenich (sideline reporter)

Game information

First Quarter

- AUB – Anders Carlson 24 yd field goal, 12:17 (AUB 3–0)
- MINN – Michael Lantz 40 yd field goal, 6:36 (TIE 3–3)
- AUB – Noah Igbinoghene 96 yd kickoff return (Anders Carlson kick), 6:23 (AUB 10–3)
- MINN – Mohamed Ibrahim 16 yd run (Michael Lantz kick), 4:05 (TIE 10–10)

Second Quarter

- MINN – Bryce Witham 1 yd pass from Seth Green (Michael Lantz kick), 7:09 (MINN 17–10)
- AUB – Sal Canella 37 yd pass from Bo Nix (Anders Carlson kick), 4:15 (TIE 17–17)
- MINN – Tyler Johnson 2 yd pass from Tanner Morgan (Michael Lantz kick), 0:32 (MINN 24–17)

Third Quarter

- AUB – JaTarvious Whitlow 3 yd run (Anders Carlson kick), 5:04 (TIE 24–24)

Fourth Quarter

- MINN – Tyler Johnson 73 yd pass from Tanner Morgan (Michael Lantz kick), 10:26 (MINN 31–24)

Top Passers

- MINN – Tanner Morgan 19–29, 278 yds, 2 TD, 1 INT
- AUB – Bo Nix 17–26, 176 yds 1 TD

Top Rushers

- MINN – Mohamed Ibrahim 20 rushes, 130 yds, 1 TD
- AUB – JaTarvious Whitlow 9 rushes, 24 yds, 1 TD

Top Receivers

- MINN – Tyler Johnson 12 receptions, 204 yds, 2 TD
- AUB – Anthony Schwartz 6 receptions, 49 yds

== Rankings ==
Ranking movements Legend: ██ Increase in ranking ██ Decrease in ranking т = Tied with team above or below ( ) = First-place votes
	Week																
Poll	Pre	1	2	3	4	5	6	7	8	9	10	11	12	13	14	15	Final
AP	16	10	8	8	7	7 (3)	12	11	9	11	12	13	16	16	11	9-T	14
Coaches	16	13	9	9	7	7	12	11	10	12	12	13	16	16	12	13	14
CFP	Not released										11	12	15	15	11	12	Not released

== Awards and honors ==
All-SEC
Player	Position	Coaches	Media
Derrick Brown	DT	1	1
Marlon Davidson	DE	1	1
K. J. Britt	LB	2	1
Prince Tega Wanogho	OT	2	–
Christian Tutt	RS	2	–
Jeremiah Dinson	S	–	2

== Players drafted into the NFL ==
Round	Pick	Player	Position	NFL Club
1	7	Derrick Brown	DT	Carolina Panthers
1	30	Noah Igbinoghene	CB	Miami Dolphins
2	47	Marlon Davidson	DE	Atlanta Falcons
4	145	Jack Driscoll	OG	Philadelphia Eagles
5	157	Daniel Thomas	S	Jacksonville Jaguars
6	210	Prince Tega Wanogho	OT	Philadelphia Eagles
