= Edgewood Academy =

Segregation academy in Alabama

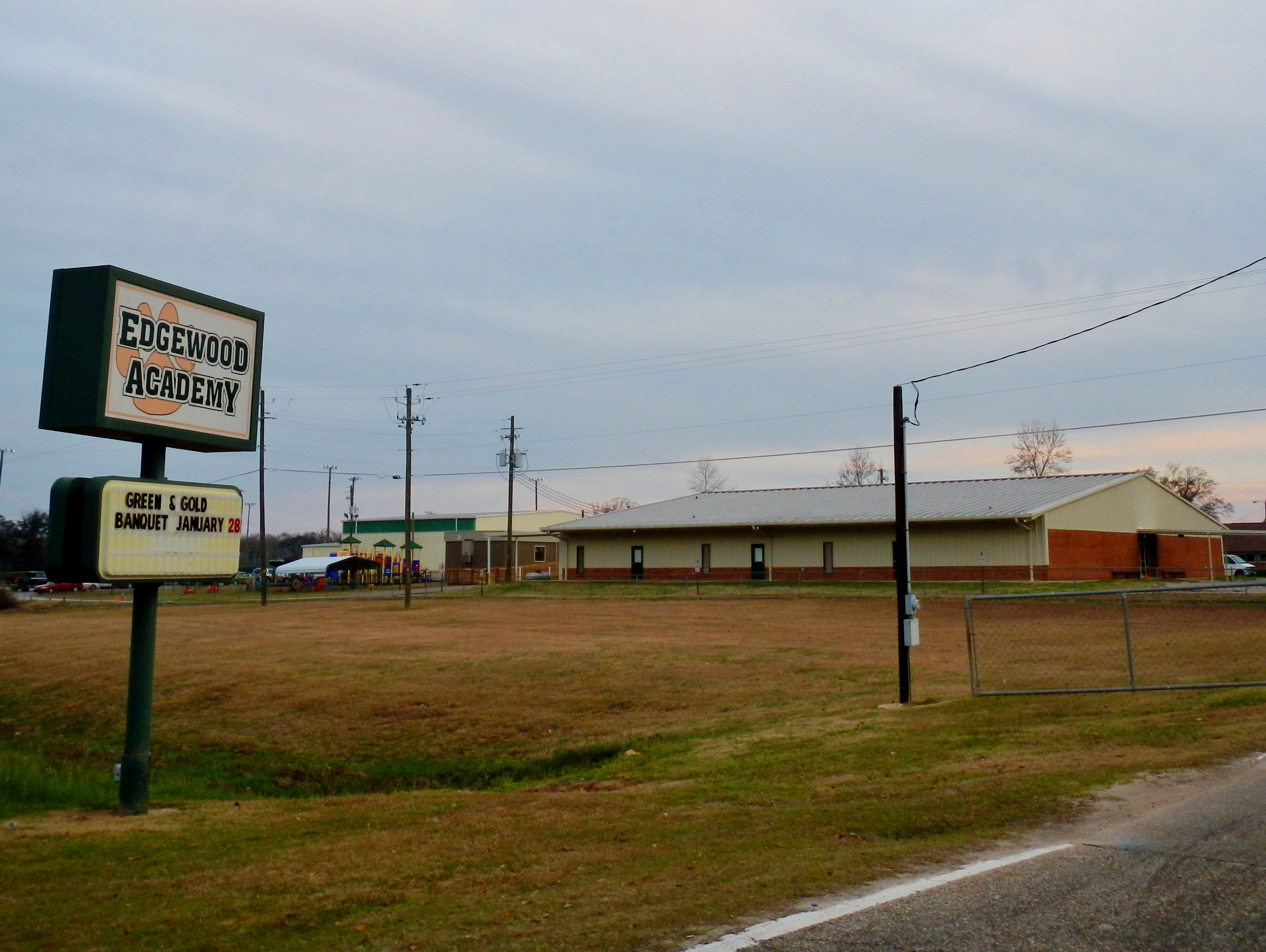

Location
- 5475 Elmore Rd; Elmore, Alabama 36025; United States; 32°32′49″N 86°17′32″W

Information
- Type: Independent
- Motto: Large enough to reach opportunity – small enough to feel like family
- Established: 1967 (59 years ago)
- Headmaster: Susan Barner
- Faculty: 21.4
- Grades: K3-12
- Enrollment: 323
- Colors: Green and gold
- Mascot: Wildcat
- Affiliations: Alabama Independent School Association
- Website: www.edgewoodacademy.org

The Edgewood Academy is a non-profit non-sectarian independent school located in Elmore, Alabama serving 323 students from preschool through twelfth grade. The school was founded in 1967 as a segregation academy. Edgewood Academy has been accredited by the Alabama Independent School Association (AISA) since 1974, the Southern Association of Colleges and Schools (SACS), and the National Council for Private School Accreditation (NCPSA).

== Athletics ==
Edgewood's varsity teams compete athletically in the Alabama Independent School Association. Varsity girls have won state championships in softball, volleyball, and cheerleading. The National Private School Athletic Association (NPSAA) awarded Edgewood's varsity football team the Division II National Championship in 2008. At the end of the 2015 season Edgewood Academy held the nation's longest eleven man high school football winning streak at 71 games according to USA Today. Edgewood Academy won a second national championship in baseball after being awarded the honor by MaxPreps.com. Edgewood Academy's baseball team finished the 2013 year ranked No. 1 in the MaxPreps Small School (enrollment under 1,000) National Baseball Rankings ahead of teams from Florida, Oklahoma and Arkansas. The school also fields youth football teams for grades 2nd, 3rd, and 4th (Termite) and grades 5th and 6th (PeeWee).

Maxpreps Small School National Championship

- Baseball- 2013

AISA State Championships

- Football- 2008, 2010, 2011, 2012, 2013, 2014, 2015 Overall Record
- Baseball- 2001, 2002, 2004, 2006, 2009, 2010, 2011,2012, 2013, 2014, 2015
- Basketball- 2001, 2015, 2019, 2023, 2024
- Softball- 1996, 2001, 2002, 2003, 2004, 2014, 2018
- Volleyball- 2011, 2016, 2017

Youth Football Tournament Championships and Regular Season Record (R)

- 2009 Warrior Bowl Champions, Auburn AL - Termites (5–0–1) and PeeWees (7–0)
- 2010 Jungle Jamboree Champions, Elmore AL - Termites (7–0)
- 2011 Jungle Jamboree Champions, Elmore AL - PeeWees (6–1–1)
- 2012 Jungle Jamboree Champions, Elmore AL - Termites (7–1) and PeeWees (8–0)
- 2012 Monroe Academy Invitational Tournament, Monroe, AL - Termites (7–1)

In 2016, Edgewood was fined $2,500 for forfeiting a football game against Autauga Academy, citing threats of injury against its players.

== Notable alumni ==
- Elizabeth Spiers (1995), journalist, founding editor of Gawker
- Prince Tega Wanogho (2015), NFL offensive tackle
- Nathan Rourke (2016), NFL and CFL quarterback
