= Flavorwire =

Online culture magazine

- Website type: Online culture magazine
- Headquarters: New York City
- Owner: Flavorpill Media/Bustle Digital Group
- Editor: Tom Hawking
- Website: flavorwire.com
- Registration: No

Flavorwire was a New York City-based online culture magazine. The site includes original feature articles, interviews, reviews, as well as content recycled from other sources. Flavorwire describes themselves as "a network of culturally connected people, covering events, art, books, music, film, TV, and pop culture the world over. Highbrow, lowbrow, and everything in between: if it's compelling we're talking about it." Flavorwire was created by Flavorpill Media.

== History ==
According to Flavorwire editorial director Elizabeth Spiers, Flavorwire "was originally designed to complement Flavorpill's events business and event-driven email newsletters. For a long time, it had no real web publication." In 2014 Flavorpill began to grow and add more original content. In 2018, Flavorpill was acquired by Bustle Digital Group.

Flavorwire ceased publication in late 2019.
