= Ronnie Lippett =

American football player (born 1960)

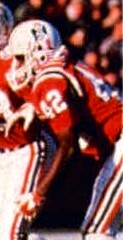
- Lippett with the New England Patriots in 1984

No. 42
- Position: Cornerback

Personal information
- Born: December 10, 1960 (age 65); Melbourne, Florida, U.S.
- Listed height: 5 ft 11 in (1.80 m)
- Listed weight: 180 lb (82 kg)

Career information
- High school: Sebring (Sebring, Florida)
- College: Miami (FL)
- NFL draft: 1983: 8th round, 214th overall pick

Career history
- New England Patriots (1983–1991)

Awards and highlights
- New England Patriots All-1980s Team

Career NFL statistics
- Games: 122
- Sacks: 1
- Interceptions: 24
- Fumbles: 8
- Stats at Pro Football Reference

Ronald Leon Lippett (/lɪˈpɛt/ lih-PET; born December 10, 1960) is an American former professional football player who was a cornerback for eight seasons with the New England Patriots of the National Football League (NFL) from 1983 to 1991. He played college football for the Miami Hurricanes and was selected by the Patriots in the eighth round of the 1983 NFL draft.

== Professional history ==
Ronnie was named the "AFC Defensive Player of the Week" as he intercepted Dan Marino twice in the Patriots 34–7 rout of the Miami Dolphins @ Sullivan Stadium on 10-05-86.

Ronnie blocked an extra point attempt by Pat Leahy in the Patriots 23–13 win over the New York Jets @ Sullivan Stadium on 9-18-83.

He recovered a fumble by Paul McDonald that helped set up the final TD in the Patriots 17–16 win over the Cleveland Browns on 10-07-84.

Ronnie returned a pass by Art Schlitcher 13 yards, with 36 seconds left, in the Patriots 16–10 win over the Colts @ Sullivan Stadium on 12-16-84.

He intercepted Joe Ferguson twice in the Patriots 38–10 rout of the Buffalo Bills @ Sullivan Stadium on 11-11-84. He intercepted Dan Marino twice in the Patriots 34–7 rout of Miami @ Sullivan on 10-05-86. He intercepted Dan Marino twice in their 27–24 loss to the Dolphins @ Foxboro Stadium on 09-09-90. Ronnie intercepted Jim Kelly and Frank Reich in the Patriots 23–3 rout of the Buffalo Bills @ Rich Stadium on 10-26-86.

Ronnie intercepted Marc Wilson twice in the Patriots 27–20 AFC Playoff Game victory over the Los Angeles Raiders @ the LA Coliseum on 01-05-86.

Ronnie was awarded the Patriots UNSUNG Hero Award after the 1987 season.

He recovered an onside kick by Dean Biasucci in the Patriots 16–14 win over the Colts on 09-16-90.

Ronnie started in 111 of his 122 regular season games for the New England Patriots and started in 4 Playoff Games.

Ronnie Lippett hated the Dolphins ever since an incident when he visited a Dolphins training as a university student. Of his 24 career interceptions, 7 of them were Dan Marino passes.

== Personal life ==
Ronnie attended Sebring High School in Sebring, FL. He currently lives in South Easton, Massachusetts.
