= Ralph McGill (American football) =

American football player (1950–2015)

No. 49
- Position: Safety

Personal information
- Born: April 28, 1950; Thomasville, Georgia, U.S.
- Died: March 21, 2015 (aged 64); St. Joseph, Missouri, U.S.
- Listed height: 5 ft 11 in (1.80 m)
- Listed weight: 183 lb (83 kg)

Career information
- High school: Sebring (FL)
- College: Tulsa
- NFL draft: 1972: 2nd round, 28th overall pick

Career history
- San Francisco 49ers (1972–1977); New Orleans Saints (1978–1979)

Awards and highlights
- Second-team All-American (1971)

Career NFL statistics
- Interceptions: 8
- Fumble recoveries: 11
- Total TDs: 2
- Stats at Pro Football Reference

Ralph Louis McGill (April 28, 1950 – March 21, 2015) was an American professional football player who was a safety in the National Football League (NFL) for the San Francisco 49ers and the New Orleans Saints. He played college football for the Tulsa Golden Hurricane. He died in 2015.
