= Elizabeth Spiers =

American journalist (born 1976)

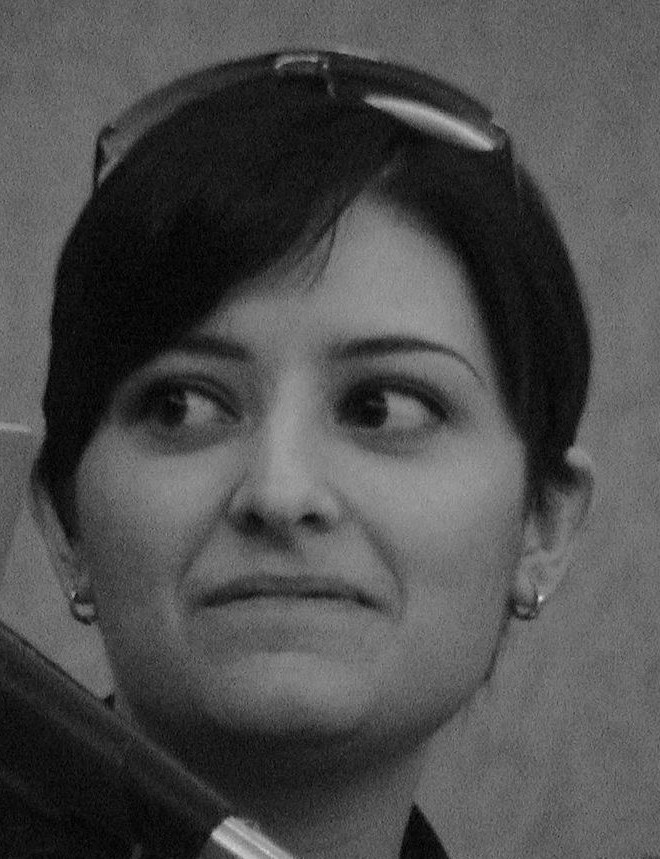
- Spiers in 2003
- Born: December 11, 1976 (age 49); Wetumpka, Alabama, U.S.
- Education: Edgewood Academy; Duke University
- Occupations: Publisher and journalist
- Known for: Founding editor of Gawker
- Website: www.elizabethspiers.com

Elizabeth Spiers (born December 11, 1976) is an American web publisher and journalist, and the founding editor of Gawker, a defunct media gossip blog.

From February 2011 until August 2012, she was the editor of The New York Observer.

== Early life and education ==
Spiers was born in Wetumpka, Alabama. She attended Edgewood Academy, which she later characterized as a segregation academy.

Spiers has written that she was "raped in college by an ostensibly nice guy who was not a stranger to me."

After graduating from Duke University in 1999 with a degree in public policy, Spiers headed to Wall Street to work in finance, but soon became involved in the fast-growing blog industry.

== Career ==
Spiers began in journalism as the founding editor of Gawker.com and later became a contributing writer and editor at New York magazine. She has written for The New York Times, Salon, Fortune, Fast Company and The New York Post, among other publications, and was an early blogger at GNXP.

She worked briefly after that as the editor-in-chief of mediabistro.com, a site offering resources for media professionals. Since then, Spiers has founded several blog sites through her company, Dead Horse Media (as in the proverb "don't beat a dead horse"). The New York Times' DealBook wrote of her in 2006: "It is clear that an online empire is on Elizabeth Spiers's mind." Dead Horse Media has produced Dealbreaker, a gossip website about Wall Street; AbovetheLaw, a blog about law; Fashionista, a gossip site about fashion; and Supermogul, a now defunct business management site. Spiers left Dead Horse Media abruptly on April 19, 2007, citing differences with her partners over launching new properties, according to BusinessWeek.

Jared Kushner hired Spiers as the editor of The New York Observer in February 2011. She resigned from the paper in August 2012. Spiers was the editorial director of Flavorwire from 2012 to 2016.

On September 12, 2025, an article by Spiers was published in The Nation in response to the assassination of conservative activist Charlie Kirk two days before. The article was subsequently condemned by Vice President J.D. Vance who claimed it misrepresented Kirk's statements and justified political violence.
