= Sebring High School =

Public school in Florida, U.S.

Coordinates: 27.4871°N 81.4316°W

Location
- 3514 Kenilworth Boulevard; Sebring, FL 33870

Information
- Type: Public high school
- Principal: Laura Sherley
- Faculty: 69.50 (on an FTE basis)
- Grades: 9 - 12
- Enrollment: 1,809 (2022–23)
- Student to teacher ratio: 26.03
- Color
- Nickname: Blue Streaks
- Information: Phone (863) 471-5500; Fax (863) 471-5507
- Website: School website

Sebring High School is a public high school in Sebring, Florida. Around 1,600 students currently attend the school.

== Notable alumni ==
- Ronnie Lippett, former cornerback for the New England Patriots (1983–1991)
- Ralph McGill, former safety for the San Francisco 49ers (1972–1977) and the New Orleans Saints (1978–1979)
- Kaylee Tuck, politician
- D. J. Williams, NFL running back for the Tampa Bay Buccaneers
