= Prince Tega Wanogho =

Nigerian-born American football player (born 1997)

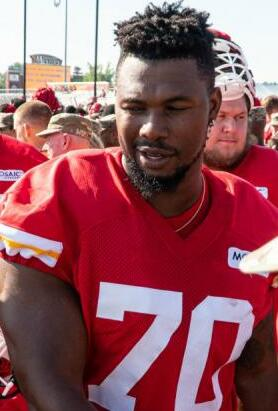
- Wanogho with the Kansas City Chiefs in 2022

No. 72, 70, 76
- Position: Offensive tackle

Personal information
- Born: 22 November 1997 (age 28); Delta State, Nigeria
- Listed height: 6 ft 5 in (1.96 m)
- Listed weight: 308 lb (140 kg)

Career information
- High school: Edgewood Academy (Elmore, Alabama, U.S.)
- College: Auburn (2015–2019)
- NFL draft: 2020: 6th round, 210th overall pick

Career history
- Philadelphia Eagles (2020); Kansas City Chiefs (2021–2023)

Awards and highlights
- 2× Super Bowl champion (LVII, LVIII); Second-team All-SEC (2019)

Career NFL statistics
- Games played: 23
- Stats at Pro Football Reference

Prince Tega Wanogho (born 22 November 1997) is a Nigerian former professional American football offensive tackle. He played college football at Auburn and was selected by the Philadelphia Eagles in the sixth round of the 2020 NFL draft.

== Early life ==
Wanogho was born in Delta State, Nigeria and moved to Alabama in 2014 in hopes of becoming a basketball player. He attended Edgewood Academy in Elmore, Alabama, where he learned to play football as a defensive lineman. Despite playing only one year of football, Wanogho was a four star recruit, committing to Auburn University; he had offers from multiple schools such as Clemson, Georgia, LSU, Ohio State, and Texas.

== College career ==
Wanogho redshirted his first year at Auburn, recovering from a leg injury he suffered while playing basketball in his final year of high school. As a converted offensive lineman, he played in 10 games as a backup in 2016.

In 2017, he took over as the starter at left tackle and remained at that position until his senior season in 2019; he started in a total of 32 games.

== Professional career ==
Pre-draft measurables
Height	Weight	Arm length	Hand span	Wingspan
6 ft 5 in (1.96 m)	308 lb (140 kg)	33 1/2 in (0.85 m)	10 3/8 in (0.26 m)	6 ft 8 3/4 in (2.05 m)
All values from NFL Combine

=== Philadelphia Eagles ===
Wanogho was selected by the Philadelphia Eagles in the sixth round (210th overall) of the 2020 NFL draft. He was waived from the team on 5 September 2020, and signed to the practice squad the next day. He was elevated to the active roster on 2 January 2021, for the team's Week 17 game against the Washington Football Team, and reverted to the practice squad after the game. His practice squad contract with the team expired after the season on 11 January.

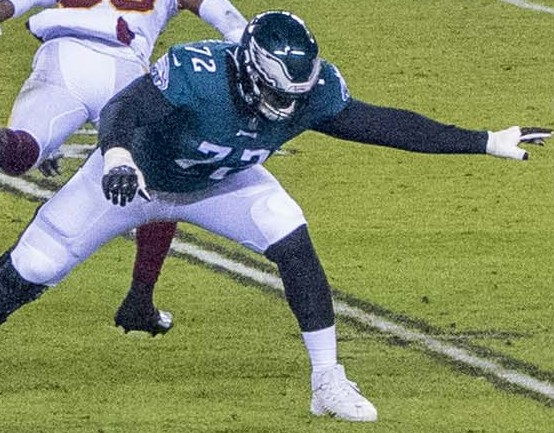
Wanogho with the Eagles in January 2021

=== Kansas City Chiefs ===
On 16 January 2021, Wanogho signed with the practice squad of the Kansas City Chiefs. Nine days later, he was released. On 26 January, Wanogho signed a reserves/futures contract with the Chiefs. He was waived on 31 August and re-signed to the practice squad the next day. He was elevated from the practice squad on 12 October.

In the 2022 season, Wanogho was mostly used on special teams. He won Super Bowl LVII where the Chiefs defeated the Philadelphia Eagles.

On 27 September 2023, Wanogho was placed on injured reserve and did not play the remainder of the season. The Chiefs won Super Bowl LVIII against the San Francisco 49ers to give Wanogho his second (consecutive) Super Bowl championship.
