= National Private School Athletic Association =

National Private School Athletic Association (NPSAA), founded in 2005, merged with the National Athletic Association of Private Schools (NAAPS), West Coast Christian School Athletic Association (WCCSAA), and the National Independent School Athletic Association (NISAA) in January 2018. Now all four associations are under the umbrella of the NAAPS.

The NPSAA exists to bring exposure and credibility to private schools across the nation. The NPSAA accomplishes this with tournaments, national rankings, radio programs, internet television station, player/coaching awards, and recruiting services.

== National Rankings ==
The NPSAA currently assembles the only national sports rankings dedicated solely to private school athletic programs. The NPSAA follows thousands of private schools over the course of the academic year and provides national rankings for ten different sports in several different divisions. These divisions are divided by school size, not talent levels, and are voted upon by the NPSAA selection committee.

The NPSAA selection committee releases weekly rankings for various sports and then has a final ballot that decides the National Champions for that season. Each voter provides his own ranking of the top 25 teams, and the individual rankings are then combined to produce the national ranking by giving a team 30 points for a first-place vote, 24 for a second-place vote, and so on down to 1 point for a twenty-fifth place vote.

== Tournaments ==
In 2009, the NPSAA added national and regional tournaments as part of their association. The NPSAA currently holds tournaments for volleyball, basketball, baseball, softball, and golf. In November 2009, the NPSAA board announced their intentions of adding post-season regional football bowl games for the 2010 season and cheerleading competitions.

The NPSAA recently announced a multi-year deal to host their national tournaments in Montgomery, AL at various venues.

== Media Expansion ==
The NPSAA underwent a large media expansion in 2009. Parts of this expansion include three weekly national internet radio programs that broadcast on Nationwide Sports Radio and a 24/7 web channel that broadcasts private school sports.

== Hall of Fame ==
The NPSAA recently announced the opening of the NPSAA Hall of Fame. Currently, this is a virtual hall of fame. However, the NPSAA will be adding a physical location when they have completed the construction of their new facilities.

The hall of fame is open to NPSAA coaches, players, athletic directors, and others who help build and/or advance the cause of private schools. The initial class for the 2009-2010 year will be 30 members. Although members are announced throughout the year there will be an induction banquet that will be hosted with the NPSAA annual awards banquet on June 5, 2010.

== Sports and Divisions offered ==
- 11-Man Football (Division I, Division II, Division III)
- 8-Man Football (Division I, Division II, Division III)
- Volleyball (Division I, Division II, Division III, Division IV, Division V)
- Basketball (Division I, Division II, Division III, Division IV, Division V)
- Baseball (Division I, Division II, Division III, Division IV, Division V)
- Softball (Division I, Division II, Division III, Division IV, Division V)
- Soccer (Division I, Division II, Division III, Division IV, Division V)
- Tennis (Division I, Division II, Division III)
- Golf (Division I, Division II, Division III)
- Lacrosse (Division I, Division II, Division III)
- Cross Country (Division I, Division II, Division III)
- Wrestling (Division I, Division II, Division III)
