= D. J. Williams (running back) =

American gridiron football player (born 1999)

Profile
- Position: Running back

Personal information
- Born: November 15, 1999 (age 26); Lake Placid, Florida, U.S.
- Listed height: 5 ft 10 in (1.78 m)
- Listed weight: 225 lb (102 kg)

Career information
- High school: Sebring (Sebring, Florida)
- College: Auburn (2019–2020); Florida State (2021); Arizona (2022–2023)
- NFL draft: 2024: undrafted

Career history
- Tampa Bay Buccaneers (2024); Calgary Stampeders (2025)*
- * Offseason or practice squad member only
- Stats at Pro Football Reference
- Stats at CFL.ca

D. J. Williams (born November 15, 1999) is an American professional football running back. He most recently played for the Calgary Stampeders of the Canadian Football League (CFL). He played college football for the Auburn Tigers, Florida State Seminoles and Arizona Wildcats.

== Early life ==
Williams was born on November 15, 1999. He is a nephew of Pro Football Hall of Fame running back Edgerrin James. He attended Sebring High School in Florida and played quarterback, throwing for 1,113 yards and 13 touchdowns as a senior while also running for 1,221 yards and 21 touchdowns. He received little attention as a recruit after being injured as a junior, but then received significant attention for his strong senior season. A three-star recruit, he committed to play college football for the Auburn Tigers as a running back, after previously having committed to the Appalachian State Mountaineers.

== College career ==
As a true freshman at Auburn in 2019, Williams ran 84 times for 400 yards and two touchdowns, also catching five receptions for 32 yards, with a top performance of 130 rushing yards against national champion LSU. Limited by injuries as a sophomore in 2020, he totaled 34 rushes for 199 yards that year, placing third on the team. He transferred to the Florida State Seminoles after the season.

Williams saw limited action with the Seminoles in 2021, appearing in only six games and totaling 10 rushes for 47 yards. He entered the NCAA transfer portal a second time following the 2021 season, committing to the Arizona Wildcats. In 2022, he appeared in all 12 games for Arizona and finished with 60 rush attempts for 376 yards and three touchdowns. As a senior in 2023, he made one start and posted 85 rushes for 372 yards and five touchdowns. He concluded his collegiate career having run 277 times for 1,394 yards and 13 touchdowns, while having appeared in 48 games.

== Professional career ==
Pre-draft measurables
Height	Weight	Arm length	Hand span	Wingspan	40-yard dash	10-yard split	20-yard split	20-yard shuttle	Three-cone drill	Vertical jump	Broad jump	Bench press
5 ft 9 5/8 in (1.77 m)	225 lb (102 kg)	30 1/4 in (0.77 m)	9 1/8 in (0.23 m)	6 ft 1 in (1.85 m)	4.59 s	1.69 s	2.69 s	4.59 s	7.49 s	30.5 in (0.77 m)	9 ft 1 in (2.77 m)	16 reps
All values from Pro Day

=== Tampa Bay Buccaneers ===
After going unselected in the 2024 NFL draft, Williams signed with the Tampa Bay Buccaneers as an undrafted free agent on May 10, 2024. He was released on August 27, 2024, and re-signed to the practice squad the following day. He was elevated to the active roster for the team's Week 6 game against the New Orleans Saints. He signed a reserve/future contract on January 14, 2025. He was waived on July 31.

=== Calgary Stampeders ===
On September 14, 2025, Thompson signed with the Calgary Stampeders. He spent the remainder of the season on the practice roster and his contract expired on November 2, 2025.
