= Marlon Davidson =

American football player (born 1998)

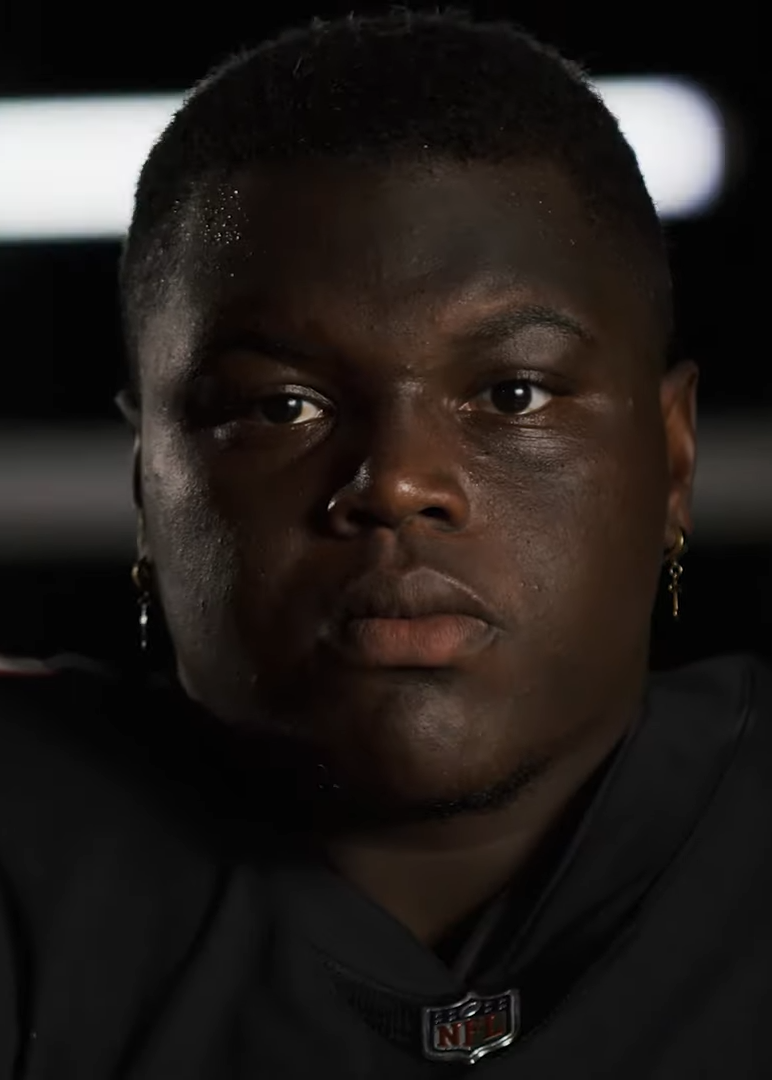
- Davidson in 2020

Profile
- Position: Defensive tackle

Personal information
- Born: May 11, 1998 (age 28); Greenville, Alabama, U.S.
- Listed height: 6 ft 3 in (1.91 m)
- Listed weight: 303 lb (137 kg)

Career information
- High school: Greenville (AL)
- College: Auburn (2016–2019)
- NFL draft: 2020: 2nd round, 47th overall pick

Career history
- Atlanta Falcons (2020–2022); San Francisco 49ers (2023)*; Tennessee Titans (2023–2024); Houston Texans (2025)*; New York Giants (2026)*
- * Offseason or practice squad member only

Awards and highlights
- First Team All-SEC (2019)

Career NFL statistics as of 2025
- Total tackles: 39
- Sacks: 2
- Fumble recoveries: 1
- Pass deflections: 2
- Interceptions: 1
- Defensive touchdowns: 1
- Stats at Pro Football Reference

Marlon Davidson (born May 11, 1998) is an American professional football defensive tackle. He played college football for the Auburn Tigers and was drafted by the Atlanta Falcons in the second round of the 2020 NFL draft. He has also played for the San Francisco 49ers and Tennessee Titans.

== Early life ==
As a five-star prospect, Davidson was highly recruited out of high school. Davidson chose to sign with Auburn, where his brother, Kenneth Carter, played football and is now on staff for the Tigers.

== College career ==
Davidson made an instant impact on the Tigers, starting in all 13 games and becoming the first Auburn freshman to start on the defensive line since 1985. He was also able to make the All-Southeastern Conference (SEC) freshman team. During his sophomore year, Davidson was able to become the SEC defensive player of the week after a game with Missouri.

== Professional career ==
Pre-draft measurables
| Height | Weight | Arm length | Hand span | Wingspan | 40-yard dash | 10-yard split | 20-yard split | Bench press |
|---|---|---|---|---|---|---|---|---|
| 6 ft 3 3/8 in (1.91 m) | 303 lb (137 kg) | 33 in (0.84 m) | 10 in (0.25 m) | 6 ft 8 1/2 in (2.04 m) | 5.04 s | 1.78 s | 2.94 s | 21 reps |
All values from NFL Combine

=== Atlanta Falcons ===
Davidson was selected by the Atlanta Falcons in the second round with the 47th overall pick in the 2020 NFL draft. He was placed on the reserve/COVID-19 list on October 13, 2020, and was activated on October 26.

On December 5, 2021, he recorded his first career interception, a pick-six against Tom Brady.

On September 1, 2022, Davidson was placed on injured reserve after undergoing arthroscopic knee surgery. He was released on October 25.

=== San Francisco 49ers ===
On May 8, 2023, Davidson was signed by the San Francisco 49ers. He was waived on August 29, and re-signed to the practice squad. He was released on October 4.

=== Tennessee Titans ===
On October 25, 2023, Davidson was signed to the Tennessee Titans practice squad. In week 14 Davidson was activated from the practice squad and played against the Miami Dolphins. One week later in a game against the Houston Texans Davidson recorded his first sack for the Titans. He was signed to the active roster on December 22. He played the last five games of the 2023 season, recording ten total tackles and a sack.

Davidson re-signed with the team on May 6, 2024. He was placed on injured reserve on August 16, and sidelined for the entirety of the 2024 season.

=== Houston Texans ===
On August 1, 2025, Davidson signed with the Houston Texans. He was released with an injury settlement on August 14. He was re-signed to the practice squad on October 7.

=== New York Giants ===
On July 27, 2026, Davidson signed with the New York Giants, just a day before training camp. He reunites with his former defensive coordinator Dennard Wilson. Davidson was released by the Giants as a part of final roster cuts on August 30.
