= List of Mid-American Conference football standings =

The Mid-American Conference first sponsored football in 1947. This is a list of its annual standings since establishment.

== Standings ==
1947 Mid-American Conference football standings
	Conf.					Overall
Team	W		L		T	W		L		T
Cincinnati $	3	–	1	–	0	7	–	3	–	0
Western Reserve	2	–	1	–	0	4	–	5	–	0
Butler	1	–	3	–	0	5	–	3	–	1
Ohio	1	–	3	–	0	3	–	5	–	1
Miami (OH) *	2	–	0	–	0	9	–	0	–	1
Western Michigan *	0	–	1	–	0	5	–	4	–	0
$ – Conference champion; * – Miami and Western Michigan were not eligible to compete for the MAC championship because they did not schedule a full slate of games against MAC opponents.

1948 Mid-American Conference football standings
	Conf.					Overall
Team	W		L		T	W		L		T
Miami (OH) $	4	–	0	–	0	7	–	1	–	1
Western Michigan	3	–	1	–	0	6	–	3	–	0
Cincinnati	3	–	1	–	0	3	–	6	–	1
Ohio	2	–	3	–	0	3	–	6	–	0
Western Reserve	1	–	4	–	0	1	–	8	–	1
Butler	0	–	4	–	0	3	–	5	–	0
$ – Conference champion

1949 Mid-American Conference football standings
	Conf.					Overall
Team	W		L		T	W		L		T
Cincinnati $	4	–	0	–	0	7	–	4	–	0
Miami (OH)	3	–	1	–	0	5	–	4	–	0
Ohio	2	–	2	–	0	4	–	4	–	1
Western Michigan	2	–	3	–	0	4	–	4	–	0
Western Reserve	1	–	3	–	1	4	–	5	–	1
Butler	0	–	3	–	0	2	–	6	–	0
$ – Conference champion

1950 Mid-American Conference football standings
	Conf.					Overall
Team	W		L		T	W		L		T
Miami (OH) $	4	–	0	–	0	9	–	1	–	0
Cincinnati	3	–	1	–	0	8	–	4	–	0
Ohio	2	–	2	–	0	6	–	4	–	0
Western Reserve	1	–	3	–	0	2	–	8	–	0
Western Michigan	1	–	3	–	0	5	–	4	–	0
$ – Conference champion

1951 Mid-American Conference football standings
	Conf.					Overall
Team	W		L		T	W		L		T
Cincinnati $	3	–	0	–	0	10	–	1	–	0
Miami (OH)	3	–	1	–	0	7	–	3	–	0
Kent State	2	–	1	–	0	4	–	3	–	2
Ohio	2	–	2	–	0	5	–	4	–	1
Western Reserve	1	–	3	–	0	2	–	6	–	1
Western Michigan	0	–	4	–	0	4	–	4	–	0
$ – Conference champion

1952 Mid-American Conference football standings
	Conf.					Overall
Team	W		L		T	W		L		T
Cincinnati $	3	–	0	–	0	8	–	1	–	1
Miami (OH)	4	–	1	–	0	8	–	1	–	0
Ohio	5	–	2	–	0	6	–	2	–	2
Bowling Green	2	–	2	–	0	7	–	2	–	0
Kent State	2	–	2	–	0	5	–	4	–	0
Western Michigan	1	–	4	–	0	4	–	4	–	0
Western Reserve	1	–	4	–	0	5	–	4	–	0
Toledo	1	–	4	–	0	4	–	5	–	0
$ – Conference champion

1953 Mid-American Conference football standings
	Conf.					Overall
Team	W		L		T	W		L		T
Ohio $	5	–	0	–	1	6	–	2	–	1
Miami (OH)	3	–	0	–	1	7	–	1	–	1
Kent State	3	–	1	–	0	7	–	2	–	0
Toledo	2	–	3	–	0	3	–	6	–	0
Western Reserve	1	–	2	–	1	5	–	3	–	1
Western Michigan	0	–	4	–	1	1	–	6	–	1
Bowling Green	0	–	4	–	0	1	–	8	–	0
$ – Conference champion

1954 Mid-American Conference football standings
	Conf.					Overall
Team	W		L		T	W		L		T
Miami (OH) $	4	–	0	–	0	8	–	1	–	0
Kent State	4	–	1	–	0	8	–	2	–	0
Ohio	5	–	2	–	0	6	–	3	–	0
Toledo	3	–	2	–	0	6	–	2	–	1
Western Michigan	3	–	4	–	0	4	–	5	–	0
Western Reserve	2	–	3	–	0	3	–	4	–	1
Marshall	2	–	5	–	0	4	–	5	–	0
Bowling Green	0	–	6	–	0	2	–	7	–	0
$ – Conference champion

1955 Mid-American Conference football standings
	Conf.					Overall
Team	W		L		T	W		L		T
No. 15 Miami (OH) $	5	–	0	–	0	9	–	0	–	0
Bowling Green	4	–	1	–	1	7	–	1	–	1
Kent State	4	–	1	–	1	6	–	2	–	1
Ohio	3	–	3	–	0	5	–	4	–	0
Toledo	2	–	4	–	0	3	–	5	–	1
Marshall	1	–	5	–	0	3	–	6	–	0
Western Michigan	0	–	5	–	0	1	–	7	–	1
$ – Conference champion; Rankings from AP Poll

1956 Mid-American Conference football standings
	Conf.					Overall
Team	W		L		T	W		L		T
Bowling Green $	5	–	0	–	1	8	–	0	–	1
Miami (OH)	4	–	0	–	1	7	–	1	–	1
Kent State	4	–	2	–	0	7	–	2	–	0
Marshall	2	–	4	–	0	3	–	6	–	0
Ohio	2	–	4	–	0	2	–	7	–	0
Western Michigan	1	–	4	–	0	2	–	7	–	0
Toledo	1	–	5	–	0	1	–	7	–	1
$ – Conference champion

1957 Mid-American Conference football standings
	Conf.					Overall
Team	W		L		T	W		L		T
Miami (OH) $	5	–	0	–	0	6	–	3	–	0
Bowling Green	3	–	1	–	2	6	–	1	–	2
Marshall	4	–	2	–	0	6	–	3	–	0
Toledo	3	–	2	–	0	5	–	4	–	0
Western Michigan	1	–	4	–	1	4	–	4	–	1
Ohio	1	–	4	–	1	2	–	6	–	1
Kent State	1	–	5	–	0	3	–	6	–	0
$ – Conference champion

1958 Mid-American Conference football standings
	Conf.					Overall
Team	W		L		T	W		L		T
No. 2 Miami (OH) $	5	–	0	–	0	6	–	3	–	0
Kent State	5	–	1	–	0	7	–	2	–	0
No. 14 Bowling Green	4	–	2	–	0	7	–	2	–	0
Ohio	2	–	4	–	0	5	–	4	–	0
Western Michigan	2	–	4	–	0	4	–	5	–	0
Toledo	1	–	4	–	0	4	–	5	–	0
Marshall	1	–	5	–	0	3	–	6	–	0
$ – Conference champion; Rankings from UPI small college poll

1959 Mid-American Conference football standings
	Conf.					Overall
Team	W		L		T	W		L		T
No. 1 Bowling Green $	6	–	0	–	0	9	–	0	–	0
No. 9 Ohio	4	–	2	–	0	7	–	2	–	0
No. 19 Miami (OH)	3	–	2	–	0	5	–	4	–	0
Kent State	3	–	3	–	0	5	–	3	–	0
Western Michigan	3	–	3	–	0	4	–	5	–	0
Marshall	1	–	4	–	0	1	–	8	–	0
Toledo	0	–	6	–	0	2	–	6	–	1
$ – Conference champion; Rankings from UPI small college poll

1960 Mid-American Conference football standings
	Conf.					Overall
Team	W		L		T	W		L		T
No. 1 Ohio $	6	–	0	–	0	10	–	0	–	0
No. 6 Bowling Green	5	–	1	–	0	8	–	1	–	0
Kent State	4	–	2	–	0	6	–	3	–	0
Miami (OH)	2	–	3	–	0	5	–	5	–	0
Western Michigan	2	–	4	–	0	4	–	4	–	1
Marshall	1	–	4	–	0	2	–	7	–	1
Toledo	0	–	6	–	0	2	–	7	–	0
$ – Conference champion; Rankings from AP small college poll

1961 Mid-American Conference football standings
	Conf.					Overall
Team	W		L		T	W		L		T
Bowling Green $	5	–	1	–	0	8	–	2	–	0
Western Michigan	4	–	1	–	1	5	–	4	–	1
Miami (OH)	3	–	2	–	0	6	–	4	–	0
Ohio	3	–	2	–	1	5	–	3	–	1
Toledo	2	–	4	–	0	3	–	7	–	0
Marshall	1	–	4	–	0	2	–	7	–	1
Kent State	1	–	5	–	0	2	–	8	–	0
$ – Conference champion

1962 Mid-American Conference football standings
	Conf.					Overall
Team	W		L		T	W		L		T
Bowling Green $	5	–	0	–	1	7	–	1	–	1
Ohio	5	–	1	–	0	8	–	3	–	0
Miami (OH)	3	–	1	–	1	8	–	2	–	1
Western Michigan	3	–	3	–	0	5	–	4	–	0
Kent State	2	–	4	–	0	3	–	6	–	0
Toledo	1	–	5	–	0	3	–	6	–	0
Marshall	0	–	5	–	0	4	–	6	–	0
$ – Conference champion

1963 Mid-American Conference football standings
	Conf.					Overall
Team	W		L		T	W		L		T
Ohio $	5	–	1	–	0	6	–	4	–	0
Miami (OH)	4	–	1	–	1	5	–	3	–	2
Bowling Green	4	–	2	–	0	8	–	2	–	0
Marshall	3	–	2	–	1	5	–	4	–	1
Western Michigan	2	–	4	–	0	2	–	7	–	0
Kent State	1	–	5	–	0	3	–	5	–	1
Toledo	1	–	5	–	0	2	–	7	–	0
$ – Conference champion

1964 Mid-American Conference football standings
	Conf.					Overall
Team	W		L		T	W		L		T
Bowling Green $	5	–	1	–	0	9	–	1	–	0
Marshall	4	–	2	–	0	7	–	3	–	0
Miami (OH)	4	–	2	–	0	6	–	3	–	1
Ohio	3	–	2	–	1	5	–	4	–	1
Western Michigan	2	–	4	–	0	3	–	6	–	0
Kent State	1	–	4	–	1	3	–	5	–	1
Toledo	1	–	5	–	0	2	–	8	–	0
$ – Conference champion

1965 Mid-American Conference football standings
	Conf.					Overall
Team	W		L		T	W		L		T
Bowling Green +	5	–	1	–	0	7	–	2	–	0
Miami (OH) +	5	–	1	–	0	7	–	3	–	0
Western Michigan	3	–	2	–	1	6	–	2	–	1
Kent State	3	–	2	–	1	5	–	4	–	1
Marshall	2	–	4	–	0	5	–	5	–	0
Toledo	2	–	4	–	0	5	–	5	–	1
Ohio	0	–	6	–	0	0	–	10	–	0
+ – Conference co-champions

1966 Mid-American Conference football standings
	Conf.					Overall
Team	W		L		T	W		L		T
Miami (OH) +	5	–	1	–	0	9	–	1	–	0
Western Michigan +	5	–	1	–	0	7	–	3	–	0
Bowling Green	4	–	2	–	0	6	–	3	–	0
Ohio	3	–	3	–	0	5	–	5	–	0
Kent State	2	–	4	–	0	4	–	6	–	0
Toledo	1	–	5	–	0	2	–	7	–	1
Marshall	1	–	5	–	0	2	–	8	–	0
+ – Conference co-champions

1967 Mid-American Conference football standings
	Conf.					Overall
Team	W		L		T	W		L		T
Toledo +	5	–	1	–	0	9	–	1	–	0
Ohio +	5	–	1	–	0	6	–	4	–	0
Miami (OH)	4	–	2	–	0	6	–	4	–	0
Western Michigan	4	–	2	–	0	5	–	4	–	0
Bowling Green	2	–	4	–	0	6	–	4	–	0
Kent State	1	–	5	–	0	4	–	6	–	0
Marshall	0	–	6	–	0	0	–	10	–	0
+ – Conference co-champions; Kent State forfeited a conference win over Ohio.

1968 Mid-American Conference football standings
	Conf.					Overall
Team	W		L		T	W		L		T
No. 20 Ohio $	6	–	0	–	0	10	–	1	–	0
Miami (OH)	5	–	1	–	0	7	–	3	–	0
Bowling Green	3	–	2	–	1	6	–	3	–	1
Toledo	3	–	2	–	1	5	–	4	–	1
Western Michigan	2	–	4	–	0	3	–	6	–	0
Kent State	1	–	5	–	0	1	–	9	–	0
Marshall	0	–	6	–	0	0	–	9	–	1
$ – Conference champion; Rankings from AP Poll

1969 Mid-American Conference football standings
	Conf.					Overall
Team	W		L		T	W		L		T
Toledo $	5	–	0	–	0	11	–	0	–	0
Bowling Green	4	–	1	–	0	6	–	4	–	0
Miami (OH)	2	–	3	–	0	7	–	3	–	0
Ohio	2	–	3	–	0	5	–	4	–	1
Kent State	1	–	4	–	0	5	–	5	–	0
Western Michigan	1	–	4	–	0	4	–	6	–	0
$ – Conference champion

1970 Mid-American Conference football standings
	Conf.					Overall
Team	W		L		T	W		L		T
No. 12 Toledo $	5	–	0	–	0	12	–	0	–	0
Miami (OH)	3	–	2	–	0	7	–	3	–	0
Ohio	3	–	2	–	0	4	–	5	–	0
Western Michigan	2	–	3	–	0	7	–	3	–	0
Kent State	1	–	4	–	0	3	–	7	–	0
Bowling Green	1	–	4	–	0	2	–	6	–	1
$ – Conference champion; Rankings from AP Poll

1971 Mid-American Conference football standings
	Conf.					Overall
Team	W		L		T	W		L		T
No. 14 Toledo $	5	–	0	–	0	12	–	0	–	0
Bowling Green	4	–	1	–	0	6	–	4	–	0
Western Michigan	2	–	3	–	0	7	–	3	–	0
Miami (OH)	2	–	3	–	0	7	–	3	–	0
Ohio	2	–	3	–	0	5	–	5	–	0
Kent State	0	–	5	–	0	3	–	8	–	0
$ – Conference champion; Rankings from AP Poll

1972 Mid-American Conference football standings
	Conf.					Overall
Team	W		L		T	W		L		T
Kent State $	4	–	1	–	0	6	–	5	–	1
Bowling Green	3	–	1	–	1	6	–	3	–	1
Western Michigan	2	–	2	–	1	7	–	3	–	1
Miami (OH)	2	–	3	–	0	7	–	3	–	0
Toledo	2	–	3	–	0	6	–	5	–	0
Ohio	1	–	4	–	0	3	–	8	–	0
$ – Conference champion

1973 Mid-American Conference football standings
	Conf.					Overall
Team	W		L		T	W		L		T
No. 15 Miami (OH) $	5	–	0	–	0	11	–	0	–	0
Kent State	4	–	1	–	0	9	–	2	–	0
Bowling Green	2	–	3	–	0	7	–	3	–	0
Ohio	2	–	3	–	0	5	–	5	–	0
Western Michigan	1	–	4	–	0	6	–	5	–	0
Toledo	1	–	4	–	0	3	–	8	–	0
$ – Conference champion; Rankings from AP Poll

1974 Mid-American Conference football standings
	Conf.					Overall
Team	W		L		T	W		L		T
No. 10 Miami (OH) $	5	–	0	–	0	10	–	0	–	1
Ohio	3	–	2	–	0	6	–	5	–	0
Toledo	3	–	2	–	0	6	–	5	–	0
Kent State	2	–	3	–	0	7	–	4	–	0
Bowling Green	2	–	3	–	0	6	–	4	–	1
Western Michigan	0	–	5	–	0	3	–	8	–	0
$ – Conference champion; Rankings from AP Poll

1975 Mid-American Conference football standings
	Conf.					Overall
Team	W		L		T	W		L		T
No. 12 Miami (OH) $	6	–	0	–	0	11	–	1	–	0
Central Michigan	4	–	1	–	1	8	–	2	–	1
Ball State	4	–	2	–	0	9	–	2	–	0
Bowling Green	4	–	2	–	0	8	–	3	–	0
Ohio	3	–	3	–	1	5	–	5	–	1
Toledo	4	–	4	–	0	5	–	6	–	0
Northern Illinois	2	–	3	–	0	3	–	8	–	0
Kent State	1	–	6	–	0	4	–	7	–	0
Western Michigan	0	–	7	–	0	1	–	10	–	0
$ – Conference champion; Rankings from AP Poll

1976 Mid-American Conference football standings
	Conf.					Overall
Team	W		L		T	W		L		T
Ball State $	4	–	1	–	0	8	–	3	–	0
Kent State	6	–	2	–	0	8	–	4	–	0
Ohio	6	–	2	–	0	7	–	4	–	0
Western Michigan	6	–	3	–	0	7	–	4	–	0
Central Michigan	4	–	3	–	0	7	–	4	–	0
Bowling Green	4	–	3	–	0	6	–	5	–	0
Miami (OH)	2	–	4	–	0	3	–	8	–	0
Toledo	2	–	6	–	0	3	–	8	–	0
Eastern Michigan	1	–	5	–	0	2	–	9	–	0
Northern Illinois	0	–	6	–	0	1	–	10	–	0
$ – Conference champion

1977 Mid-American Conference football standings
	Conf.					Overall
Team	W		L		T	W		L		T
Miami (OH) $	5	–	0	–	0	10	–	1	–	0
Central Michigan	7	–	1	–	0	10	–	1	–	0
Ball State	5	–	1	–	0	9	–	2	–	0
Bowling Green	4	–	3	–	0	5	–	7	–	0
Eastern Michigan	4	–	3	–	0	8	–	3	–	0
Kent State	5	–	4	–	0	6	–	5	–	0
Western Michigan	3	–	5	–	0	4	–	7	–	0
Northern Illinois	2	–	5	–	0	3	–	8	–	0
Toledo	2	–	7	–	0	2	–	9	–	0
Ohio	0	–	8	–	0	1	–	10	–	0
$ – Conference champion

1978 Mid-American Conference football standings
	Conf.					Overall
Team	W		L		T	W		L		T
Ball State $	8	–	0	–	0	10	–	1	–	0
Central Michigan	8	–	1	–	0	9	–	2	–	0
Miami (OH)	5	–	2	–	0	8	–	2	–	1
Western Michigan	5	–	4	–	0	7	–	4	–	0
Bowling Green	3	–	5	–	0	4	–	7	–	0
Ohio	3	–	5	–	0	3	–	8	–	0
Northern Illinois	2	–	4	–	0	5	–	6	–	0
Kent State	2	–	6	–	0	4	–	7	–	0
Toledo	2	–	7	–	0	2	–	9	–	0
Eastern Michigan	1	–	5	–	0	3	–	7	–	0
$ – Conference champion

1979 Mid-American Conference football standings
	Conf.					Overall
Team	W		L		T	W		L		T
Central Michigan $	8	–	0	–	1	10	–	0	–	1
Toledo	7	–	1	–	1	7	–	3	–	1
Western Michigan	5	–	4	–	0	6	–	5	–	0
Ball State	4	–	4	–	0	6	–	5	–	0
Ohio	4	–	4	–	0	6	–	5	–	0
Northern Illinois	3	–	3	–	1	5	–	5	–	1
Miami (OH)	3	–	4	–	0	6	–	5	–	0
Bowling Green	3	–	5	–	0	4	–	7	–	0
Eastern Michigan	1	–	6	–	1	2	–	8	–	1
Kent State	1	–	8	–	0	1	–	10	–	0
$ – Conference champion

1980 Mid-American Conference football standings
	Conf.					Overall
Team	W		L		T	W		L		T
Central Michigan $	7	–	2	–	0	9	–	2	–	0
Western Michigan	6	–	3	–	0	7	–	4	–	0
Northern Illinois	4	–	3	–	0	7	–	4	–	0
Miami (OH)	4	–	3	–	0	5	–	6	–	0
Ball State	5	–	4	–	0	6	–	5	–	0
Ohio	5	–	4	–	0	6	–	5	–	0
Bowling Green	4	–	4	–	0	4	–	7	–	0
Toledo	3	–	6	–	0	4	–	7	–	0
Kent State	3	–	6	–	0	3	–	8	–	0
Eastern Michigan	1	–	7	–	0	1	–	9	–	0
$ – Conference champion

1981 Mid-American Conference football standings
	Conf.					Overall
Team	W		L		T	W		L		T
Toledo $	8	–	1	–	0	9	–	3	–	0
Miami (OH)	6	–	1	–	1	8	–	2	–	1
Central Michigan	7	–	2	–	0	7	–	4	–	0
Bowling Green	5	–	3	–	1	5	–	5	–	1
Western Michigan	5	–	4	–	0	6	–	5	–	0
Ohio	5	–	4	–	0	5	–	6	–	0
Kent State	3	–	6	–	0	4	–	7	–	0
Ball State	2	–	6	–	0	4	–	7	–	0
Northern Illinois	2	–	7	–	0	3	–	8	–	0
Eastern Michigan	0	–	9	–	0	0	–	11	–	0
$ – Conference champion

1982 Mid-American Conference football standings
	Conf.					Overall
Team	W		L		T	W		L		T
Bowling Green $	7	–	2	–	0	7	–	5	–	0
Western Michigan	5	–	2	–	2	7	–	2	–	2
Miami (OH)	5	–	3	–	0	7	–	4	–	0
Central Michigan	5	–	3	–	1	6	–	4	–	1
Ohio	5	–	4	–	0	6	–	5	–	0
Toledo	5	–	4	–	0	6	–	5	–	0
Northern Illinois	5	–	4	–	0	5	–	5	–	0
Ball State	4	–	4	–	0	5	–	6	–	0
Eastern Michigan	1	–	7	–	1	1	–	9	–	1
Kent State	0	–	9	–	0	0	–	11	–	0
$ – Conference champion; The conference was a hybrid of NCAA Division I-A and I-AA programs. Central Michigan and Toledo were I-A while the other teams were classified as I-AA for the 1982 season only.

1983 Mid-American Conference football standings
	Conf.					Overall
Team	W		L		T	W		L		T
Northern Illinois $	8	–	1	–	0	10	–	2	–	0
Toledo	7	–	2	–	0	9	–	2	–	0
Bowling Green	7	–	2	–	0	8	–	3	–	0
Central Michigan	7	–	2	–	0	8	–	3	–	0
Ball State	4	–	4	–	0	6	–	5	–	0
Western Michigan	4	–	5	–	0	6	–	5	–	0
Miami (OH)	3	–	5	–	0	4	–	7	–	0
Ohio	3	–	6	–	0	4	–	7	–	0
Kent State	1	–	8	–	0	1	–	10	–	0
Eastern Michigan	0	–	9	–	0	1	–	10	–	0
$ – Conference champion

1984 Mid-American Conference football standings
	Conf.					Overall
Team	W		L		T	W		L		T
Toledo $	7	–	1	–	1	8	–	3	–	1
Bowling Green	7	–	2	–	0	8	–	3	–	0
Central Michigan	6	–	2	–	1	8	–	2	–	1
Ohio	4	–	4	–	1	4	–	6	–	1
Northern Illinois	3	–	5	–	1	4	–	6	–	1
Miami (OH)	3	–	5	–	0	4	–	7	–	0
Ball State	3	–	5	–	0	3	–	8	–	0
Western Michigan	3	–	6	–	0	5	–	6	–	0
Kent State	3	–	6	–	0	4	–	7	–	0
Eastern Michigan	2	–	5	–	2	2	–	7	–	2
$ – Conference champion

1985 Mid-American Conference football standings
	Conf.					Overall
Team	W		L		T	W		L		T
Bowling Green $	9	–	0	–	0	11	–	1	–	0
Miami (OH)	7	–	1	–	1	8	–	2	–	1
Central Michigan	6	–	3	–	0	7	–	3	–	0
Western Michigan	4	–	4	–	1	4	–	6	–	1
Northern Illinois	4	–	4	–	0	4	–	7	–	0
Ball State	3	–	6	–	0	4	–	7	–	0
Eastern Michigan	3	–	6	–	0	4	–	7	–	0
Toledo	3	–	6	–	0	4	–	7	–	0
Kent State	2	–	6	–	0	3	–	8	–	0
Ohio	2	–	7	–	0	2	–	9	–	0
$ – Conference champion

1986 Mid-American Conference football standings
	Conf.					Overall
Team	W		L		T	W		L		T
Miami (OH) $	6	–	2	–	0	8	–	4	–	0
Toledo	5	–	3	–	0	7	–	4	–	0
Bowling Green	5	–	3	–	0	5	–	6	–	0
Kent State	5	–	3	–	0	5	–	6	–	0
Ball State	4	–	4	–	0	6	–	5	–	0
Eastern Michigan	4	–	4	–	0	6	–	5	–	0
Central Michigan	4	–	4	–	0	5	–	5	–	0
Western Michigan	3	–	5	–	0	3	–	8	–	0
Ohio	0	–	8	–	0	1	–	10	–	0
$ – Conference champion

1987 Mid-American Conference football standings
	Conf.					Overall
Team	W		L		T	W		L		T
Eastern Michigan $	7	–	1	–	0	10	–	2	–	0
Kent State	5	–	3	–	0	7	–	4	–	0
Miami (OH)	5	–	3	–	0	5	–	6	–	0
Bowling Green	5	–	3	–	0	5	–	6	–	0
Western Michigan	4	–	4	–	0	5	–	6	–	0
Central Michigan	3	–	4	–	1	5	–	5	–	1
Toledo	3	–	4	–	1	3	–	7	–	1
Ball State	3	–	5	–	0	4	–	7	–	0
Ohio	0	–	8	–	0	1	–	10	–	0
$ – Conference champion

1988 Mid-American Conference football standings
	Conf.					Overall
Team	W		L		T	W		L		T
Western Michigan $	7	–	1	–	0	9	–	3	–	0
Eastern Michigan	5	–	2	–	1	6	–	3	–	1
Ball State	5	–	3	–	0	8	–	3	–	0
Central Michigan	5	–	3	–	0	7	–	4	–	0
Ohio	4	–	3	–	1	4	–	6	–	1
Toledo	4	–	4	–	0	6	–	5	–	0
Kent State	3	–	5	–	0	5	–	6	–	0
Bowling Green	1	–	6	–	1	2	–	8	–	1
Miami (OH)	0	–	7	–	1	0	–	10	–	1
$ – Conference champion

1989 Mid-American Conference football standings
	Conf.					Overall
Team	W		L		T	W		L		T
Ball State $	6	–	1	–	1	7	–	3	–	2
Eastern Michigan	6	–	2	–	0	7	–	3	–	1
Toledo	6	–	2	–	0	6	–	5	–	0
Central Michigan	5	–	2	–	1	5	–	5	–	1
Bowling Green	5	–	3	–	0	5	–	6	–	0
Western Michigan	3	–	5	–	0	5	–	6	–	0
Miami (OH)	2	–	5	–	1	2	–	8	–	1
Ohio	1	–	6	–	1	1	–	9	–	1
Kent State	0	–	8	–	0	0	–	11	–	0
$ – Conference champion

1990 Mid-American Conference football standings
	Conf.					Overall
Team	W		L		T	W		L		T
Toledo +	7	–	1	–	0	9	–	2	–	0
Central Michigan +	7	–	1	–	0	8	–	3	–	1
Ball State	5	–	3	–	0	7	–	4	–	0
Western Michigan	5	–	3	–	0	7	–	4	–	0
Miami (OH)	4	–	3	–	1	5	–	5	–	1
Bowling Green	2	–	4	–	2	3	–	5	–	2
Eastern Michigan	2	–	6	–	0	2	–	9	–	0
Kent State	2	–	6	–	0	2	–	9	–	0
Ohio	0	–	7	–	1	1	–	9	–	1
+ – Conference co-champions

1991 Mid-American Conference football standings
	Conf.					Overall
Team	W		L		T	W		L		T
Bowling Green $	8	–	0	–	0	11	–	1	–	0
Central Michigan	3	–	1	–	4	6	–	1	–	4
Miami (OH)	4	–	3	–	1	6	–	4	–	1
Toledo	4	–	3	–	1	5	–	5	–	1
Ball State	4	–	4	–	0	6	–	5	–	0
Western Michigan	4	–	4	–	0	6	–	5	–	0
Eastern Michigan	3	–	4	–	1	3	–	7	–	1
Ohio	1	–	6	–	1	2	–	8	–	1
Kent State	1	–	7	–	0	1	–	10	–	0
$ – Conference champion

1992 Mid-American Conference football standings
	Conf.					Overall
Team	W		L		T	W		L		T
Bowling Green $	8	–	0	–	0	10	–	2	–	0
Western Michigan	6	–	3	–	0	7	–	3	–	1
Toledo	5	–	3	–	0	8	–	3	–	0
Akron	5	–	3	–	0	7	–	3	–	1
Miami (OH)	5	–	3	–	0	6	–	4	–	1
Ball State	5	–	4	–	0	5	–	6	–	0
Central Michigan	4	–	5	–	0	5	–	6	–	0
Kent State	2	–	7	–	0	2	–	9	–	0
Eastern Michigan	1	–	7	–	0	1	–	10	–	0
Ohio	1	–	7	–	0	1	–	10	–	0
$ – Conference champion

1993 Mid-American Conference football standings
	Conf.					Overall
Team	W		L		T	W		L		T
Ball State $	7	–	0	–	1	8	–	3	–	1
Western Michigan	6	–	1	–	1	7	–	3	–	1
Bowling Green	5	–	1	–	2	6	–	3	–	2
Central Michigan	5	–	4	–	0	5	–	6	–	0
Akron	4	–	4	–	0	5	–	6	–	0
Ohio	4	–	5	–	0	4	–	7	–	0
Eastern Michigan	3	–	5	–	0	4	–	7	–	0
Toledo	3	–	5	–	0	4	–	7	–	0
Miami (OH)	3	–	6	–	0	4	–	7	–	0
Kent State	0	–	9	–	0	0	–	11	–	0
$ – Conference champion

1994 Mid-American Conference football standings
	Conf.					Overall
Team	W		L		T	W		L		T
Central Michigan $	8	–	1	–	0	9	–	3	–	0
Bowling Green	7	–	1	–	0	9	–	2	–	0
Western Michigan	5	–	3	–	0	7	–	4	–	0
Miami (OH)	5	–	3	–	0	5	–	5	–	1
Ball State	5	–	3	–	1	5	–	5	–	1
Toledo	4	–	3	–	1	6	–	4	–	1
Eastern Michigan	5	–	4	–	0	5	–	6	–	0
Kent State	2	–	7	–	0	2	–	9	–	0
Akron	1	–	8	–	0	1	–	10	–	0
Ohio	0	–	9	–	0	0	–	11	–	0
$ – Conference champion

1995 Mid-American Conference football standings
	Conf.					Overall
Team	W		L		T	W		L		T
No. 24 Toledo $	7	–	0	–	1	11	–	0	–	1
Miami (OH)	6	–	1	–	1	8	–	2	–	1
Ball State	6	–	2	–	0	7	–	4	–	0
Western Michigan	6	–	2	–	0	7	–	4	–	0
Eastern Michigan	5	–	3	–	0	6	–	5	–	0
Bowling Green	3	–	5	–	0	5	–	6	–	0
Central Michigan	2	–	6	–	0	4	–	7	–	0
Akron	2	–	6	–	0	2	–	9	–	0
Ohio	1	–	6	–	1	2	–	8	–	1
Kent State	0	–	7	–	1	1	–	9	–	1
$ – Conference champion; Rankings from AP Poll

1996 Mid-American Conference football standings
	Conf.			Overall
Team	W		L	W		L
Ball State $	7	–	1	8	–	4
Toledo	6	–	2	7	–	4
Miami (OH)	6	–	2	6	–	5
Ohio	5	–	3	6	–	6
Central Michigan	4	–	4	5	–	6
Akron	3	–	5	4	–	7
Bowling Green	3	–	5	4	–	7
Eastern Michigan	3	–	5	3	–	8
Western Michigan	2	–	6	2	–	9
Kent State	1	–	7	2	–	9
$ – Conference champion

1997 Mid-American Conference football standings
	Conf.			Overall
Team	W		L	W		L
East Division
Marshall x$	7	–	1	10	–	3
Miami (OH)	6	–	2	8	–	3
Ohio	6	–	2	8	–	3
Bowling Green	3	–	5	3	–	8
Kent State	3	–	5	3	–	8
Akron	2	–	7	2	–	9
West Division
Toledo x	7	–	1	9	–	3
Western Michigan	6	–	2	8	–	3
Ball State	4	–	4	5	–	6
Eastern Michigan	4	–	5	4	–	7
Central Michigan	1	–	7	2	–	9
Northern Illinois	0	–	8	0	–	11
Championship: Marshall 34, Toledo 14
$ – Conference champion; x – Division champion/co-champions

1998 Mid-American Conference football standings
	Conf.			Overall
Team	W		L	W		L
East Division
Marshall xy$	7	–	1	12	–	1
Miami (OH) x	7	–	1	10	–	1
Bowling Green	5	–	3	5	–	6
Ohio	5	–	3	5	–	6
Akron	3	–	6	4	–	7
Kent State	0	–	8	0	–	11
West Division
Toledo x	6	–	2	7	–	5
Western Michigan	5	–	3	7	–	4
Central Michigan	5	–	3	6	–	5
Eastern Michigan	3	–	6	3	–	8
Northern Illinois	2	–	6	2	–	9
Ball State	1	–	7	1	–	10
Championship: Marshall 23, Toledo 17
$ – Conference champion; x – Division champion/co-champions; y – Championship game participant

1999 Mid-American Conference football standings
	Conf.			Overall
Team	W		L	W		L
East Division
No. 10 Marshall x$	8	–	0	13	–	0
Miami (OH)	6	–	2	7	–	4
Akron	5	–	3	7	–	4
Ohio	5	–	3	5	–	6
Bowling Green	3	–	5	5	–	6
Kent State	2	–	6	2	–	9
Buffalo	0	–	8	0	–	11
West Division
Western Michigan x	6	–	2	7	–	5
Toledo	5	–	3	6	–	5
Northern Illinois	5	–	3	5	–	6
Eastern Michigan	4	–	4	4	–	7
Central Michigan	3	–	5	4	–	7
Ball State	0	–	8	0	–	11
Championship: Marshall 34, Western Michigan 30
$ – Conference champion; x – Division champion/co-champions; Rankings from AP Poll

2000 Mid-American Conference football standings
	Div			Conf.			Overall
Team	W		L	W		L	W		L
East Division
Marshall xy$	5	–	1	5	–	3	8	–	5
Akron x	5	–	1	5	–	3	6	–	5
Ohio	4	–	2	5	–	3	7	–	4
Miami (OH)	4	–	2	5	–	3	6	–	5
Bowling Green	1	–	5	2	–	6	2	–	9
Buffalo	2	–	4	2	–	6	2	–	9
Kent State	0	–	6	1	–	7	1	–	10
West Division
Western Michigan xy	4	–	1	7	–	1	9	–	3
Toledo x	4	–	1	6	–	1	10	–	1
Northern Illinois	2	–	3	4	–	3	6	–	5
Ball State	2	–	3	4	–	3	5	–	6
Eastern Michigan	2	–	3	2	–	5	3	–	8
Central Michigan	1	–	4	2	–	6	2	–	9
Championship: Marshall 19, Western Michigan 14
$ – Conference champion; x – Division champion/co-champions; y – Championship game participant; Due to an unbalanced conference schedule, the team with best division record within each division was awarded that division's championship game berth.

2001 Mid-American Conference football standings
	Div			Conf.			Overall
Team	W		L	W		L	W		L
East Division
Marshall x	6	–	0	8	–	0	11	–	2
Miami (OH)	4	–	2	6	–	2	7	–	5
Bowling Green	4	–	2	5	–	3	8	–	3
Kent State	3	–	3	5	–	3	6	–	5
Akron	3	–	3	4	–	4	4	–	7
Buffalo	1	–	5	1	–	7	3	–	8
Ohio	0	–	6	1	–	7	1	–	10
West Division
No. 23 Toledo xy$	4	–	1	5	–	2	10	–	2
Northern Illinois x	4	–	1	4	–	3	6	–	5
Ball State x	4	–	1	4	–	3	5	–	6
Western Michigan	2	–	3	4	–	4	5	–	6
Central Michigan	1	–	4	2	–	6	3	–	8
Eastern Michigan	0	–	5	1	–	6	2	–	9
Championship: Toledo 41, Marshall 36
$ – Conference champion; x – Division champion/co-champions; Due to an unbalanced conference schedule, the team with best division record within each division was awarded that division's championship game berth.; Rankings from AP Poll

2002 Mid-American Conference football standings
	Conf.			Overall
Team	W		L	W		L
East Division
No. 24 Marshall x$	7	–	1	11	–	2
UCF	6	–	2	7	–	5
Miami (OH)	5	–	3	7	–	5
Ohio	4	–	4	4	–	8
Akron	3	–	5	4	–	8
Kent State	1	–	7	3	–	9
Buffalo	0	–	8	1	–	11
West Division
Toledo xy	7	–	1	9	–	5
Northern Illinois x	7	–	1	8	–	4
Bowling Green	6	–	2	9	–	3
Ball State	4	–	4	6	–	6
Western Michigan	3	–	5	4	–	8
Central Michigan	2	–	6	4	–	8
Eastern Michigan	1	–	7	3	–	9
Championship: Marshall 49, Toledo 45
$ – Conference champion; x – Division champion/co-champions; Rankings from AP Poll

2003 Mid-American Conference football standings
	Conf.			Overall
Team	W		L	W		L
East Division
No. 10 Miami (OH) x$	8	–	0	13	–	1
Marshall	6	–	2	8	–	4
Akron	5	–	3	7	–	5
Kent State	4	–	4	5	–	7
UCF	2	–	6	3	–	9
Ohio	1	–	7	2	–	10
Buffalo	1	–	7	1	–	11
West Division
No. 23 Bowling Green x	7	–	1	11	–	3
Northern Illinois	6	–	2	10	–	2
Toledo	6	–	2	8	–	4
Western Michigan	4	–	4	5	–	7
Ball State	3	–	5	4	–	8
Eastern Michigan	2	–	6	3	–	9
Central Michigan	1	–	7	3	–	9
Championship: Miami 49, Bowling Green 27
$ – Conference champion; x – Division champion/co-champions; Rankings from AP Poll

2004 Mid-American Conference football standings
	Conf.			Overall
Team	W		L	W		L
East Division
Miami (OH) x	7	–	1	8	–	5
Akron	6	–	2	6	–	5
Marshall	6	–	2	6	–	6
Kent State	4	–	4	5	–	6
Ohio	2	–	6	4	–	7
Buffalo	2	–	6	2	–	9
UCF	0	–	8	0	–	11
West Division
Toledo xy$	7	–	1	9	–	4
Northern Illinois x	7	–	1	9	–	3
Bowling Green	6	–	2	9	–	3
Eastern Michigan	4	–	4	4	–	7
Central Michigan	3	–	5	4	–	7
Ball State	2	–	6	2	–	9
Western Michigan	0	–	8	1	–	10
Championship: Toledo 35, Miami 27
$ – Conference champion; x – Division champion/co-champions; y – Championship game participant

2005 Mid-American Conference football standings
	Conf.			Overall
Team	W		L	W		L
East Division
Akron xy$	5	–	3	7	–	6
Miami (OH) x	5	–	3	7	–	4
Bowling Green x	5	–	3	6	–	5
Ohio	3	–	5	4	–	7
Buffalo	1	–	7	1	–	10
Kent State	0	–	8	1	–	10
West Division
Northern Illinois xy	6	–	2	7	–	5
Toledo x	6	–	2	9	–	3
Western Michigan	5	–	3	7	–	4
Central Michigan	5	–	3	6	–	5
Ball State	4	–	4	4	–	7
Eastern Michigan	3	–	5	4	–	7
Championship: Akron 31, NIU 30
$ – Conference champion; x – Division champion/co-champions

2006 Mid-American Conference football standings
	Conf.			Overall
Team	W		L	W		L
East Division
Ohio x	7	–	1	9	–	5
Kent State	5	–	3	6	–	6
Akron	3	–	5	5	–	7
Bowling Green	3	–	5	4	–	8
Miami (OH)	2	–	6	2	–	10
Buffalo	1	–	7	2	–	10
West Division
Central Michigan x$	7	–	1	10	–	4
Western Michigan	6	–	2	8	–	5
Northern Illinois	5	–	3	7	–	6
Ball State	5	–	3	5	–	7
Toledo	3	–	5	5	–	7
Eastern Michigan	1	–	7	1	–	11
Championship: Central Michigan 31, Ohio 10
$ – Conference champion; x – Division champion/co-champions

2007 Mid-American Conference football standings
	Div			Conf.			Overall
Team	W		L	W		L	W		L
East Division
Miami (OH) xy	4	–	2	5	–	2	6	–	7
Bowling Green x	4	–	2	6	–	2	8	–	5
Buffalo x	4	–	2	5	–	3	5	–	7
Ohio	3	–	3	4	–	4	6	–	6
Temple	3	–	3	4	–	4	4	–	8
Akron	2	–	4	3	–	5	4	–	8
Kent State	1	–	5	1	–	7	3	–	9
West Division
Central Michigan xy$	4	–	1	6	–	1	8	–	6
Ball State x	4	–	1	5	–	2	7	–	6
Eastern Michigan	3	–	2	3	–	4	4	–	8
Western Michigan	2	–	3	3	–	4	5	–	7
Toledo	2	–	3	3	–	5	5	–	7
Northern Illinois	0	–	5	1	–	6	2	–	10
Championship: Central Michigan 35, Miami 10
$ – Conference champion; x – Division champion/co-champions; Due to an unbalanced conference schedule, the team with best division record within each division was awarded that division's championship game berth.

2008 Mid-American Conference football standings
	Conf.			Overall
Team	W		L	W		L
East Division
Buffalo x$	5	–	3	8	–	6
Bowling Green	4	–	4	6	–	6
Temple	4	–	4	5	–	7
Ohio	3	–	5	4	–	8
Akron	3	–	5	5	–	7
Kent State	3	–	5	4	–	8
Miami (OH)	1	–	7	2	–	10
West Division
Ball State x	8	–	0	12	–	2
Central Michigan	6	–	2	8	–	5
Western Michigan	6	–	2	9	–	4
Northern Illinois	5	–	3	6	–	7
Toledo	2	–	6	3	–	9
Eastern Michigan	2	–	6	3	–	9
Championship: Buffalo 42, Ball State 24
$ – Conference champion; x – Division champion/co-champions

2009 Mid-American Conference football standings
	Conf.			Overall
Team	W		L	W		L
East Division
Ohio xy	7	–	1	9	–	5
Temple x	7	–	1	9	–	4
Bowling Green	6	–	2	7	–	6
Kent State	4	–	4	5	–	7
Buffalo	3	–	5	5	–	7
Akron	2	–	6	3	–	9
Miami (OH)	1	–	7	1	–	11
West Division
No. 23 Central Michigan x$	8	–	0	12	–	2
Northern Illinois	5	–	3	7	–	6
Western Michigan	4	–	4	5	–	7
Toledo	3	–	5	5	–	7
Ball State	2	–	6	2	–	10
Eastern Michigan	0	–	8	0	–	12
Championship: Central Michigan 20, Ohio 10
$ – Conference champion; x – Division champion/co-champions; y – Championship game participant; Rankings from AP Poll

2010 Mid-American Conference football standings
	Conf.			Overall
Team	W		L	W		L
East Division
Miami (OH) x$	7	–	1	10	–	4
Ohio	6	–	2	8	–	5
Temple	5	–	3	8	–	4
Kent State	4	–	4	5	–	7
Bowling Green	1	–	7	2	–	10
Buffalo	1	–	7	2	–	10
Akron	1	–	7	1	–	11
West Division
Northern Illinois x	8	–	0	11	–	3
Toledo	7	–	1	8	–	5
Western Michigan	5	–	3	6	–	6
Ball State	3	–	5	4	–	8
Central Michigan	2	–	6	3	–	9
Eastern Michigan	2	–	6	2	–	10
Championship: Miami 26, Northern Illinois 21
$ – Conference champion; x – Division champion/co-champions

2011 Mid-American Conference football standings
	Conf.			Overall
Team	W		L	W		L
East Division
Ohio xy	6	–	2	10	–	4
Temple	5	–	3	9	–	4
Kent State	4	–	4	5	–	7
Bowling Green	3	–	5	5	–	7
Miami (OH)	3	–	5	4	–	8
Buffalo	2	–	6	3	–	9
Akron	0	–	8	1	–	11
West Division
Northern Illinois xy$	7	–	1	11	–	3
Toledo x	7	–	1	9	–	4
Western Michigan	5	–	3	7	–	6
Ball State	4	–	4	6	–	6
Eastern Michigan	4	–	4	6	–	6
Central Michigan	2	–	6	3	–	9
Championship: Northern Illinois 23, Ohio 20
$ – Conference champion; x – Division champion/co-champions; y – Championship game participant

2012 Mid-American Conference football standings
	Conf.			Overall
Team	W		L	W		L
East Division
Kent State x	8	–	0	11	–	3
Bowling Green	6	–	2	8	–	5
Ohio	4	–	4	9	–	4
Buffalo	3	–	5	4	–	8
Miami (OH)	3	–	5	4	–	8
UMass	1	–	7	1	–	11
Akron	0	–	8	1	–	11
West Division
No. 22 Northern Illinois x$	8	–	0	12	–	2
Toledo	6	–	2	9	–	4
Ball State	6	–	2	9	–	4
Central Michigan	4	–	4	7	–	6
Western Michigan	2	–	6	4	–	8
Eastern Michigan	1	–	7	2	–	10
Championship: Northern Illinois 44, Kent State 37
$ – Conference champion and BCS representative as top non-AQ school to meet automatic qualification criteria; x – Division champion/co-champions; UMass not eligible for conference title or bowl game as part of FBS transition; Rankings from AP Poll

2013 Mid-American Conference football standings
	Conf.			Overall
Team	W		L	W		L
East Division
Bowling Green x$	7	–	1	10	–	4
Buffalo	6	–	2	8	–	5
Ohio	4	–	4	7	–	6
Akron	4	–	4	5	–	7
Kent State	3	–	5	4	–	8
UMass	1	–	7	1	–	11
Miami (OH)	0	–	8	0	–	12
West Division
Northern Illinois x	8	–	0	12	–	2
Ball State	7	–	1	10	–	3
Toledo	5	–	3	7	–	5
Central Michigan	5	–	3	6	–	6
Eastern Michigan	1	–	7	2	–	10
Western Michigan	1	–	7	1	–	11
Championship: Bowling Green 47, Northern Illinois 27
$ – Conference champion; x – Division champion/co-champions

2014 Mid-American Conference football standings
	Conf.			Overall
Team	W		L	W		L
East Division
Bowling Green x	5	–	3	8	–	6
Ohio	4	–	4	6	–	6
Buffalo	3	–	4	5	–	6
Akron	3	–	5	5	–	7
UMass	3	–	5	3	–	9
Miami (OH)	2	–	6	2	–	10
Kent State	1	–	6	2	–	9
West Division
Northern Illinois xy$	7	–	1	11	–	3
Toledo x	7	–	1	9	–	4
Western Michigan	6	–	2	8	–	5
Central Michigan	5	–	3	7	–	6
Ball State	4	–	4	5	–	7
Eastern Michigan	1	–	7	2	–	10
Championship: Northern Illinois 51, Bowling Green 17
$ – Conference champion; x – Division champion/co-champions; y – Championship game participant

2015 Mid-American Conference football standings
	Conf.			Overall
Team	W		L	W		L
East Division
Bowling Green x$	7	–	1	10	–	4
Ohio	5	–	3	8	–	5
Akron	5	–	3	8	–	5
Buffalo	3	–	5	5	–	7
Kent State	2	–	6	3	–	9
Miami (OH)	2	–	6	3	–	9
UMass	2	–	6	3	–	9
West Division
Northern Illinois xy	6	–	2	8	–	6
Western Michigan x	6	–	2	8	–	5
Toledo x	6	–	2	10	–	2
Central Michigan x	6	–	2	7	–	6
Ball State	2	–	6	3	–	9
Eastern Michigan	0	–	8	1	–	11
Championship: Bowling Green 34, Northern Illinois 14
$ – Conference champion; x – Division champion/co-champions; y – Championship game participant

2016 Mid-American Conference football standings
	Conf.			Overall
Team	W		L	W		L
East Division
Ohio xy	6	–	2	8	–	6
Miami (OH) x	6	–	2	6	–	7
Akron	3	–	5	5	–	7
Bowling Green	3	–	5	4	–	8
Kent State	2	–	6	3	–	9
Buffalo	1	–	7	2	–	10
West Division
No. 15 Western Michigan xy$	8	–	0	13	–	1
Toledo	6	–	2	9	–	4
Northern Illinois	5	–	3	5	–	7
Eastern Michigan	4	–	4	7	–	6
Central Michigan	3	–	5	6	–	7
Ball State	1	–	7	4	–	8
Championship: Western Michigan 29, Ohio 23
$ – Conference champion; x – Division champion/co-champions; y – Championship game participant; Rankings from AP Poll

2017 Mid-American Conference football standings
	Conf.			Overall
Team	W		L	W		L
East Division
Akron xy	6	–	2	7	–	7
Ohio	5	–	3	9	–	4
Miami (OH)	4	–	4	5	–	7
Buffalo	4	–	4	6	–	6
Bowling Green	2	–	6	2	–	10
Kent State	1	–	7	2	–	10
West Division
Toledo xy$	7	–	1	11	–	3
Central Michigan	6	–	2	8	–	5
Northern Illinois	6	–	2	8	–	5
Western Michigan	4	–	4	6	–	6
Eastern Michigan	3	–	5	5	–	7
Ball State	0	–	8	2	–	10
Championship: Toledo 45, Akron 28
$ – Conference champion; x – Division champion/co-champions; y – Championship game participant

2018 Mid-American Conference football standings
	Conf.			Overall
Team	W		L	W		L
East Division
Buffalo x	7	–	1	10	–	4
Miami (OH)	6	–	2	6	–	6
Ohio	6	–	2	9	–	4
Akron	2	–	6	4	–	8
Bowling Green	2	–	6	3	–	9
Kent State	1	–	7	2	–	10
West Division
Northern Illinois x$	6	–	2	8	–	6
Western Michigan	5	–	3	7	–	6
Eastern Michigan	5	–	3	7	–	6
Toledo	5	–	3	7	–	6
Ball State	3	–	5	4	–	8
Central Michigan	0	–	8	1	–	11
Championship: Northern Illinois 30, Buffalo 29
$ – Conference champion; x – Division champion/co-champions

2019 Mid-American Conference football standings
	Conf.			Overall
Team	W		L	W		L
East Division
Miami (OH) x$	6	–	2	8	–	6
Ohio	5	–	3	7	–	6
Buffalo	5	–	3	8	–	5
Kent State	5	–	3	7	–	6
Bowling Green	2	–	6	3	–	9
Akron	0	–	8	0	–	12
West Division
Central Michigan x	6	–	2	8	–	6
Western Michigan	5	–	3	7	–	6
Ball State	4	–	4	5	–	7
Northern Illinois	4	–	4	5	–	7
Toledo	3	–	5	6	–	6
Eastern Michigan	3	–	5	6	–	7
Championship: Miami 26, Central Michigan 21
$ – Conference champion; x – Division champion/co-champions

2020 Mid-American Conference football standings
	Conf.			Overall
Team	W		L	W		L
East Division
No. 25 Buffalo xy	5	–	0	6	–	1
Kent State	3	–	1	3	–	1
Ohio	2	–	1	2	–	1
Miami (OH)	2	–	1	2	–	1
Akron	1	–	5	1	–	5
Bowling Green	0	–	5	0	–	5
West Division
No. 23 Ball State xy$	5	–	1	7	–	1
Western Michigan	4	–	2	4	–	2
Toledo	4	–	2	4	–	2
Central Michigan	3	–	3	3	–	3
Eastern Michigan	2	–	4	2	–	4
Northern Illinois	0	–	6	0	–	6
Championship: Ball State 38, Buffalo 28
$ – Conference champion; x – Division champion/co-champions; y – Championship game participant; Note: Due to COVID-19, the Mid-American suspended the season on August 8, but later decided to begin play on November 4.; Rankings from AP Poll.

2021 Mid-American Conference football standings
	Conf.			Overall
Team	W		L	W		L
East Division
Kent State xy	6	–	2	7	–	7
Miami (OH)	5	–	3	7	–	6
Ohio	3	–	5	3	–	9
Bowling Green	2	–	6	4	–	8
Buffalo	2	–	6	4	–	8
Akron	1	–	7	2	–	10
West Division
Northern Illinois xy$	6	–	2	9	–	5
Central Michigan x	6	–	2	9	–	4
Toledo	5	–	3	7	–	6
Ball State	4	–	4	6	–	7
Eastern Michigan	4	–	4	7	–	6
Western Michigan	4	–	4	8	–	5
Championship: Northern Illinois 41, Kent State 23
$ – Conference champion; x – Division champion/co-champions; y – Championship game participant

2022 Mid-American Conference football standings
	Conf.			Overall
Team	W		L	W		L
East Division
Ohio xy	7	–	1	10	–	4
Buffalo	5	–	3	7	–	6
Bowling Green	5	–	3	6	–	7
Miami (OH)	4	–	4	6	–	7
Kent State	4	–	4	5	–	7
Akron	1	–	7	2	–	10
West Division
Toledo xy$	5	–	3	9	–	5
Eastern Michigan x	5	–	3	9	–	4
Western Michigan	4	–	4	5	–	7
Ball State	3	–	5	5	–	7
Central Michigan	3	–	5	4	–	8
Northern Illinois	2	–	6	3	–	9
Championship: Toledo 17, Ohio 7
$ – Conference champion; x – Division champion/co-champions; y – Championship game participant; Rankings from AP Poll

2023 Mid-American Conference football standings
	Conf.			Overall
Team	W		L	W		L
East Division
Miami (OH) xy$	7	–	1	11	–	3
Ohio	6	–	2	10	–	3
Bowling Green	5	–	3	7	–	6
Buffalo	3	–	5	3	–	9
Akron	1	–	7	2	–	10
Kent State	0	–	8	1	–	11
West Division
Toledo xy	8	–	0	11	–	3
Northern Illinois	5	–	3	7	–	6
Eastern Michigan	4	–	4	6	–	7
Central Michigan	3	–	5	5	–	7
Ball State	3	–	5	4	–	8
Western Michigan	3	–	5	4	–	8
Championship: Miami (OH) 23, Toledo 14
$ – Conference champion; x – Division champion/co-champions; y – Championship game participant

2024 Mid-American Conference football standings
	Conf.			Overall
Team	W		L	W		L
Miami (OH) y	7	–	1	9	–	5
Ohio y$	7	–	1	11	–	3
Buffalo	6	–	2	9	–	4
Bowling Green	6	–	2	7	–	6
Western Michigan	5	–	3	6	–	7
Toledo	4	–	4	8	–	5
Northern Illinois	4	–	4	8	–	5
Akron	3	–	5	4	–	8
Eastern Michigan	2	–	6	5	–	7
Central Michigan	2	–	6	4	–	8
Ball State	2	–	6	3	–	9
Kent State	0	–	8	0	–	12
Championship: Ohio 38, Miami (OH) 3
$ – Conference champion; y – Championship game participant

2025 Mid-American Conference football standings
	Conf.			Overall
Team	W		L	W		L
Akron*	0	–	0	0	–	0
Ball State	0	–	0	0	–	0
Bowling Green	0	–	0	0	–	0
Buffalo	0	–	0	0	–	0
Central Michigan	0	–	0	0	–	0
Eastern Michigan	0	–	0	0	–	0
Kent State	0	–	0	0	–	0
Miami (OH)	0	–	0	0	–	0
Northern Illinois	0	–	0	0	–	0
Ohio	0	–	0	0	–	0
Toledo	0	–	0	0	–	0
UMass	0	–	0	0	–	0
Western Michigan	0	–	0	0	–	0
Championship: December 6, 2025
* Ineligible for postseason play due to low APR score; As of June 29, 2025
