= 2004 NCAA Division I-A football season =

American college football season

2004 NCAA Division I-A season
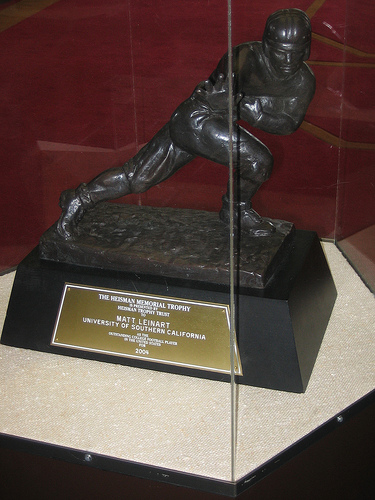
- Heisman Trophy awarded to Matt Leinart
- Number of teams: 117 full members + 2 transitional
- Preseason AP No. 1: USC

Postseason
- Duration: December 14, 2004 – January 4, 2005
- Bowl games: 28
- Heisman Trophy: USC quarterback Matt Leinart

Bowl Championship Series
- 2005 Orange Bowl
- Site: Dolphin Stadium, Miami Gardens, Florida
- Champion(s): None (vacated by USC)

Division I-A football seasons
- ← 2003 2005 →

The 2004 NCAA Division I-A football season was the highest level of college football competition in the United States organized by the National Collegiate Athletic Association (NCAA). The regular season began on August 28, 2004, and ended on December 4, 2004. The postseason concluded on January 4, 2005, with the Orange Bowl, which served as the season's Bowl Championship Series (BCS) National Championship Game.

USC defeated Oklahoma in the Orange Bowl by a score of 55–19, which earned the Trojans their second consecutive AP title and first-ever BCS title. The Orange Bowl win and accompanying BCS title were later vacated as part of the sanctions levied against USC following an NCAA investigation. The Coaches Poll and FWAA titles were also vacated. USC appealed the decision but was denied by the NCAA, and the 2004 BCS title was officially vacated on June 6, 2011. 2004 is the only season in the BCS era not to have a national champion.

== Rule changes ==
The NCAA Rules Committee adopted the following rule changes for the 2004 season:

- Instant replay would make its debut in college football, as the Big Ten Conference began to use it on a one-year experimental basis.
- Officials are allowed to announce the number of a player committing a penalty, similar to the NFL.
- Modifying the rule regarding offensive substitutions made and rushing to snap the ball before the defense can make their changes; eliminating the five yard penalty for the first offense (but stopping play and warning the offensive team), but maintaining the 15 yard unsportsmanlike conduct penalty for further violations.
- Allowing the head coach to request a time-out.
- Allowing the receiving team the option to enforce encroachment penalties on punts/kickoffs either from the end of the return or from the previous line of scrimmage, requiring a re-kick.
- Leaping on PAT/Field Goal attempts is prohibited.
- Defensive pass interference will not be called when a kicker throws a ball high and downfield to simulate a pass.
- Roughing the passer will not be called if a defensive player is blocked into the passer.

== Conference changes ==
Prior to the 2004 season, Miami (FL) and Virginia Tech left the Big East Conference to join the Atlantic Coast Conference (ACC), giving the ACC 11 members. Connecticut joined the Big East after having been an Independent since ascending to Division I-A in 2000. Troy State also left their Independent status and joined the Sun Belt Conference. Florida Atlantic University and Florida International University moved up from Division I-AA and became I-A Independents. Florida A&M also briefly attempted to move up to Division I-A and become the only HBCU at college football's highest level, but the team was forced to abort its bid.

School	2003 Conference	2004 Conference
Connecticut Huskies	I-A Independent	Big East
Florida Atlantic Owls	I-AA Independent	I-A Independent
Florida International Panthers	I-AA Independent	I-A Independent
Miami Hurricanes	Big East	ACC
Troy State Trojans	I-A Independent	Sun Belt
Virginia Tech Hokies	Big East	ACC

== Regular season top 10 matchups ==
Rankings reflect the AP Poll. Rankings for Week 8 and beyond will list BCS Rankings first and AP Poll second. Teams that failed to be a top 10 team for one poll or the other will be noted.

- Week 2
  - No. 5 Miami defeated No. 4 Florida State, 16–10 ^{OT} (Miami Orange Bowl, Miami, Florida)
- Week 5
  - No. 8 Auburn defeated No. 10 Tennessee, 34–10 (Neyland Stadium, Knoxville, Tennessee)
- Week 6
  - No. 1 USC defeated No. 7 California, 23–17 (Los Angeles Memorial Coliseum, Los Angeles, California)
  - No. 2 Oklahoma defeated No. 5 Texas, 12–0 (Cotton Bowl, Dallas, Texas)
- Week 7
  - No. 7 Florida State defeated No. 6 Virginia, 36–3 (Doak Campbell Stadium, Tallahassee, Florida)
  - No. 10 Wisconsin defeated No. 5 Purdue, 20–17 (Ross-Ade Stadium, West Lafayette, Indiana)
- Week 11
  - No. 3/3 Auburn defeated No. 8/8 Georgia, 24–6 (Jordan-Hare Stadium, Auburn, Alabama)
- Week 14
  - No. 12/10 Virginia Tech defeated No. 10/9 Miami, 16–10 (Miami Orange Bowl, Miami, Florida)

== BCS Controversy ==
=== Undefeated teams ===
In the 2003 season, no team finished the regular season unbeaten, and five teams finished the season with one loss. In 2004, the situation became even more complicated, as five teams went without losing, a record in the BCS era (later tied in 2009). USC of the Pac-10, Oklahoma of the Big 12, Auburn of the SEC, Utah of the MWC, and Boise State of the WAC all finished the regular season undefeated. USC and Oklahoma were ranked No. 1 and No. 2, respectively, in the preseason by both the AP and Coaches Polls, but the other three undefeated teams were handicapped by starting the season out of the top 15. Thus USC and OU played for the BCS National Championship in the Orange Bowl, while Auburn, Utah, and Boise State had to settle for other bowl games.

Auburn played in the Sugar Bowl and beat Virginia Tech, the ACC champion and ranked No. 8 by the BCS. Utah became the first BCS Buster and beat Pittsburgh, the champion of the Big East and ranked No. 21, in the Fiesta Bowl. Boise State lost a close, high scoring game in the Liberty Bowl to Louisville, the No. 10 ranked Conference USA champion.

As with previous seasons, fans of successful teams left out of BCS bowls were disappointed. Auburn, Utah, and Boise State all went unbeaten but were not offered a chance to compete for the BCS championship. Auburn was especially the focus of national media attention on this topic, since Auburn managed to go undefeated in the traditionally tough SEC. Adding to the frustration with the BCS system was that Auburn and Utah, though both picked to play in BCS bowl games, would not be able to play each other as a match-up of highly ranked unbeatens. This confluence of events made 2004 a seminal year for serious momentum building behind a multi-team playoff system in college football, which would later be realized with the advent of the College Football Playoff in 2014.

USC was forced to vacate its BCS title win, along with its regular-season victory over rival UCLA, due to NCAA sanctions that stemmed from the USC athletics scandal. The AP title was not vacated, as the AP does not punish teams for violations. The severity of these sanctions has since been criticized by some pundits across college football.

=== Rose Bowl ===
Controversy also arose in selecting the second at-large team of the BCS after Utah. California expected to get the invitation, having been ranked fourth by the BCS entering the last week of the regular season. Texas, which had been left out of the BCS the previous season, was ranked fifth. Both teams finished with 10–1 records, but the Longhorns received a boost of support from poll voters in the final regular season rankings to overtake Cal and move into the fourth position, which ensured they would also receive the final at-large bid. Texas coach Mack Brown was criticized for publicly politicking voters to put Texas ahead of California, and Cal coach Jeff Tedford called for coaches' votes to be made public. Texas went on to defeat Michigan in the Rose Bowl, while California lost to Texas Tech in the Holiday Bowl. Much of the pre-bowl criticisms of Texas being given the spot vs. Michigan evaporated when the Longhorns and Wolverines produced an instant classic game that was marked by a breakthrough performance by Vince Young and a Texas FG as time expired to give them a 38–37 victory.

=== AP Poll ===
The Associated Press, as a result of two consecutive seasons of BCS controversy, prohibited the BCS from using their poll as part of its ranking formula following the 2004 season. The AP poll was replaced by the Harris Interactive poll starting in 2005, and the AP continues to award its own national championship trophy.

In another first, the LSU Tigers lost to the Iowa Hawkeyes on a last second Hail Mary pass in the Capital One Bowl, becoming the first school to lose a non-BCS bowl a year after winning the BCS National Championship Game.

== Conference standings ==
2004 Atlantic Coast Conference football standings
	Conf.			Overall
Team	W		L	W		L
No. 10 Virginia Tech $	7	–	1	10	–	3
No. 15 Florida State	6	–	2	9	–	3
No. 11 Miami (FL)	5	–	3	9	–	3
No. 23 Virginia	5	–	3	8	–	4
North Carolina	5	–	3	6	–	6
Georgia Tech	4	–	4	7	–	5
Clemson	4	–	4	6	–	5
NC State	3	–	5	5	–	6
Maryland	3	–	5	5	–	6
Wake Forest	1	–	7	4	–	7
Duke	1	–	7	2	–	9
$ – BCS representative as conference champion; Rankings from AP Poll

2004 Big 12 Conference football standings
	Conf.			Overall
Team	W		L	W		L
North Division
Colorado xy	4	–	4	8	–	5
Iowa State x	4	–	4	7	–	5
Nebraska	3	–	5	5	–	6
Missouri	3	–	5	5	–	6
Kansas	2	–	6	4	–	7
Kansas State	2	–	6	4	–	7
South Division
No. 3 Oklahoma xy$	8	–	0	12	–	1
No. 5 Texas %	7	–	1	11	–	1
Texas A&M	5	–	3	7	–	5
No. 18 Texas Tech	5	–	3	8	–	4
Oklahoma State	4	–	4	7	–	5
Baylor	1	–	7	3	–	8
Championship: Oklahoma 42, Colorado 3
$ – BCS representative as conference champion; % – BCS at-large representative; x – Division champion/co-champions; y – Championship game participant; Rankings from AP Poll

2004 Big East Conference football standings
	Conf.			Overall
Team	W		L	W		L
No. 21 Boston College +	4	–	2	9	–	3
No. 25 Pittsburgh $+	4	–	2	8	–	4
West Virginia +	4	–	2	8	–	4
Syracuse +	4	–	2	6	–	6
Connecticut	3	–	3	8	–	4
Rutgers	1	–	5	4	–	7
Temple	1	–	5	2	–	9
$ – BCS representative as conference champion; + – Conference co-champions; Rankings from AP Poll

2004 Big Ten Conference football standings
	Conf.			Overall
Team	W		L	W		L
No. 14 Michigan $+	7	–	1	9	–	3
No. 8 Iowa +	7	–	1	10	–	2
No. 17 Wisconsin	6	–	2	9	–	3
Northwestern	5	–	3	6	–	6
No. 20 Ohio State	4	–	4	8	–	4
Purdue	4	–	4	7	–	5
Michigan State	4	–	4	5	–	7
Minnesota	3	–	5	7	–	5
Penn State	2	–	6	4	–	7
Illinois	1	–	7	3	–	8
Indiana	1	–	7	3	–	8
$ – BCS representative as conference champion; + – Conference co-champions; Rankings from AP Poll

2004 Conference USA football standings
	Conf.			Overall
Team	W		L	W		L
No. 6 Louisville $	8	–	0	11	–	1
Memphis	5	–	3	8	–	4
Southern Miss	5	–	3	7	–	5
Cincinnati	5	–	3	7	–	5
UAB	5	–	3	7	–	5
TCU	3	–	5	5	–	6
Tulane	3	–	5	5	–	6
South Florida	3	–	5	4	–	7
Houston	3	–	5	3	–	8
East Carolina	2	–	6	2	–	9
Army	2	–	6	2	–	9
$ – Conference champion; Rankings from AP Poll

2004 Mid-American Conference football standings
	Conf.			Overall
Team	W		L	W		L
East Division
Miami (OH) x	7	–	1	8	–	5
Akron	6	–	2	6	–	5
Marshall	6	–	2	6	–	6
Kent State	4	–	4	5	–	6
Ohio	2	–	6	4	–	7
Buffalo	2	–	6	2	–	9
UCF	0	–	8	0	–	11
West Division
Toledo xy$	7	–	1	9	–	4
Northern Illinois x	7	–	1	9	–	3
Bowling Green	6	–	2	9	–	3
Eastern Michigan	4	–	4	4	–	7
Central Michigan	3	–	5	4	–	7
Ball State	2	–	6	2	–	9
Western Michigan	0	–	8	1	–	10
Championship: Toledo 35, Miami 27
$ – Conference champion; x – Division champion/co-champions; y – Championship game participant

2004 Mountain West Conference football standings
	Conf.			Overall
Team	W		L	W		L
No. 4 Utah $	7	–	0	12	–	0
New Mexico	5	–	2	7	–	5
BYU	4	–	3	5	–	6
Wyoming	3	–	4	7	–	5
Air Force	3	–	4	5	–	6
Colorado State	3	–	4	4	–	7
San Diego State	2	–	5	4	–	7
UNLV	1	–	6	2	–	9
$ – Conference champion and BCS representative as top non-AQ school to meet automatic qualification criteria; Rankings from AP Poll

2004 Pacific-10 Conference football standings
	Conf.			Overall
Team	W		L	W		L
No. 1 USC † $	8	–	0	13	–	0
No. 9 California	7	–	1	10	–	2
No. 19 Arizona State	5	–	3	9	–	3
Oregon State	5	–	3	7	–	5
UCLA	4	–	4	6	–	6
Oregon	4	–	4	5	–	6
Washington State	3	–	5	5	–	6
Stanford	2	–	6	4	–	7
Arizona	2	–	6	3	–	8
Washington	0	–	8	1	–	10
$ – Conference champion; † – USC later vacated 2 wins (1 in conference), as well as the BCS and Pac-10 championships, due to NCAA sanctions.; Rankings from AP Poll

2004 Southeastern Conference football standings
	Conf.			Overall
Team	W		L	W		L
Eastern Division
No. 13 Tennessee x	7	–	1	10	–	3
No. 7 Georgia	6	–	2	10	–	2
Florida	4	–	4	7	–	5
South Carolina	4	–	4	6	–	5
Kentucky	1	–	7	2	–	9
Vanderbilt	1	–	7	2	–	9
Western Division
No. 2 Auburn x$	8	–	0	13	–	0
No. 16 LSU	6	–	2	9	–	3
Alabama	3	–	5	6	–	6
Arkansas	3	–	5	5	–	6
Ole Miss	3	–	5	4	–	7
Mississippi State	2	–	6	3	–	8
Championship: Auburn 38, Tennessee 28
$ – BCS representative as conference champion; x – Division champion/co-champions; Rankings from AP Poll

2004 Sun Belt Conference football standings
	Conf.			Overall
Team	W		L	W		L
North Texas $	7	–	0	7	–	5
Troy State	4	–	2	7	–	5
New Mexico State	3	–	2	5	–	6
Middle Tennessee	4	–	4	5	–	6
Louisiana–Monroe	3	–	3	5	–	6
Arkansas State	3	–	4	3	–	8
Louisiana–Lafayette	2	–	5	4	–	7
Utah State	2	–	5	3	–	8
Idaho	2	–	5	3	–	9
$ – Conference champion

2004 Western Athletic Conference football standings
	Conf.			Overall
Team	W		L	W		L
No. 12 Boise State $	8	–	0	11	–	1
UTEP	6	–	2	8	–	4
No. 22 Fresno State	5	–	3	9	–	3
Louisiana Tech	5	–	3	6	–	6
Hawaii	4	–	4	8	–	5
Nevada	3	–	5	5	–	7
Tulsa	3	–	5	4	–	8
SMU	3	–	5	3	–	8
Rice	2	–	6	3	–	8
San Jose State	1	–	7	2	–	9
$ – Conference champion; Rankings from AP Poll

2004 NCAA Division I-A independents football records
	Conf.			Overall
Team	W		L	W		L
No. 24 Navy		–		10	–	2
Notre Dame		–		6	–	6
Florida A&M		–		3	–	8
Rankings from AP Poll

== I-AA team wins over I-A teams ==
Italics denotes I-AA teams.

Date	Visiting team	Home team	Site	Result	Attendance	Ref.
September 4	Florida Atlantic	Hawaii	Aloha Stadium • Hālawa, Hawaii	35–28 ^{OT}	39,390	
September 11	Florida Atlantic	North Texas	Fouts Field • Denton, Texas	20–13	15,803	
September 11	No. 19 (I-AA) New Hampshire	Rutgers	Rutgers Stadium • Piscataway, New Jersey	35–24	31,615	
September 18	Florida Atlantic	Middle Tennessee	Johnny "Red" Floyd Stadium • Murfreesboro, Tennessee	27–20	13,348	
September 18	No. 15 (I-AA) Maine	Mississippi State	Davis Wade Stadium • Starkville, Mississippi	9–7	43,486	
September 25	Eastern Illinois	Eastern Michigan	Rynearson Stadium • Ypsilanti, Michigan	31–28		
^{#}Rankings from AP Poll released prior to game.

- Note: Florida Atlantic was transitioning from I-AA to I-A.

== Final AP Poll ==
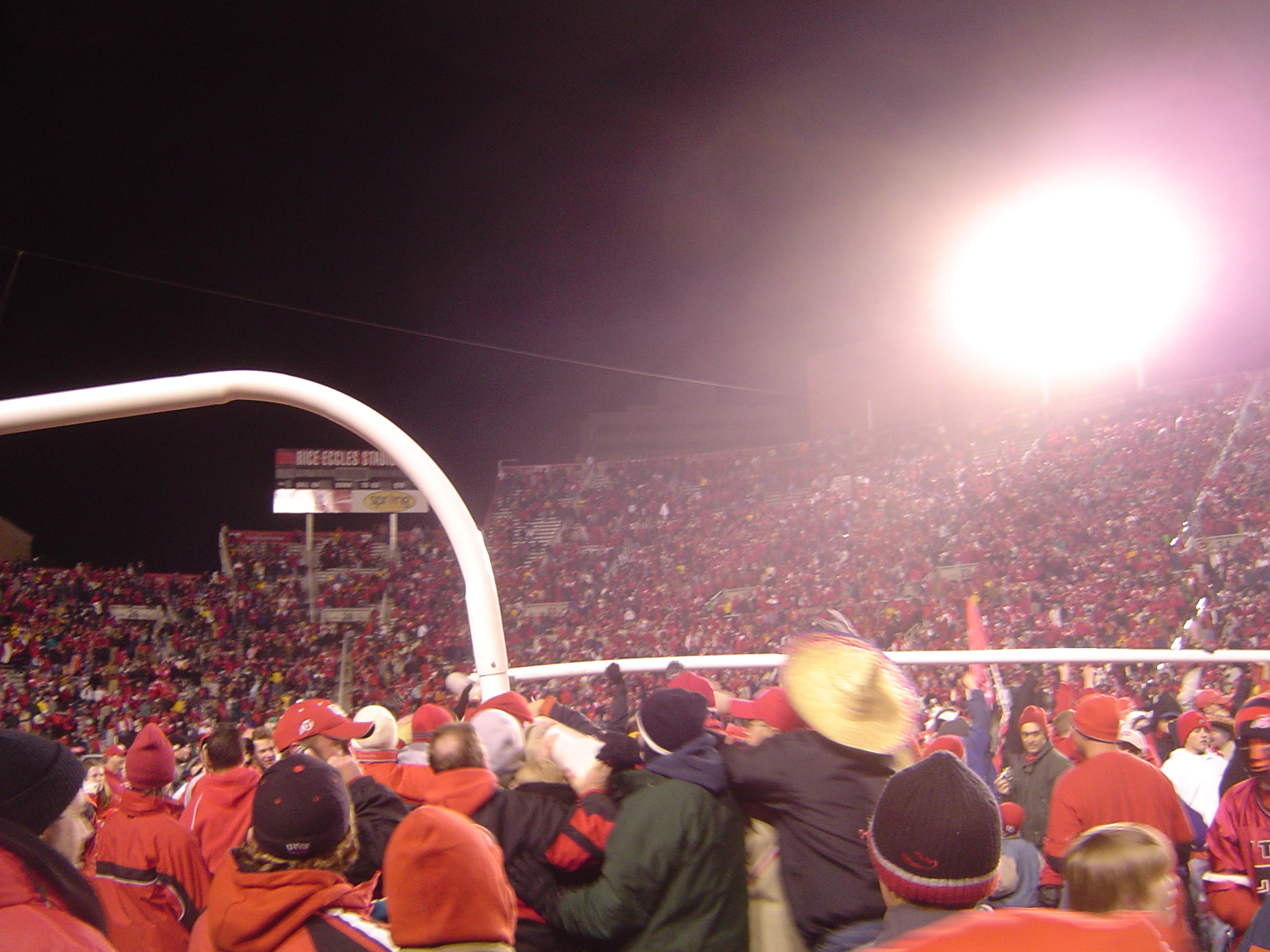
Utah Utes fans rush the field and carry the goalpost after defeating rival BYU, completing a perfect regular season, and becoming the first BCS Buster by clinching a spot in the 2005 Fiesta Bowl (hence the sombrero).

1. USC (11–0)*
2. Auburn (13–0)
3. Oklahoma (12–1)
4. Utah (12–0)
5. Texas (11–1)
6. Louisville (11–1)
7. Georgia (10–2)
8. Iowa (10–2)
9. California (10–2)
10. Virginia Tech (10–3)
11. Miami (9–3)
12. Boise State (11–1)
13. Tennessee (10–3)
14. Michigan (9–3)
15. Florida State (9–3)
16. LSU (9–3)
17. Wisconsin (9–3)
18. Texas Tech (8–4)
19. Arizona State (9–3)
20. Ohio State (8–4)
21. Boston College (9–3)
22. Fresno State (9–3)
23. Virginia (8–4)
24. Navy (10–2)
25. Pittsburgh (8–4)

* USC finished the season with a 13–0 record but was forced to vacate two wins in 2010 as a result of NCAA sanctions.

== Bowl games ==
=== BCS bowls ===
Rankings given are AP rankings going into bowl games

- Orange Bowl: No. 1 (BCS No. 1) USC 55, No. 2 (BCS No. 2) Oklahoma 19 (vacated due to NCAA violations)
- Rose Bowl: (At Large) No. 6 Texas 38, (Big Ten Champ) No. 13 Michigan 37
- Fiesta Bowl: (At Large, MWC Champ) No. 5 Utah 35, (Big East Co-Champ) No. 19 Pittsburgh 7
- Sugar Bowl: (SEC Champ) No. 3 Auburn 16, (ACC Champ) No. 9 Virginia Tech 13

=== Other New Years Day bowls ===
- Cotton Bowl Classic: No. 15 Tennessee 38, No. 22 Texas A&M 7
- Capital One Bowl: No. 11 Iowa 30, No. 12 LSU 25
- Gator Bowl: No. 17 Florida State 30, West Virginia 18
- Outback Bowl: No. 8 Georgia 24, No. 16 Wisconsin 21

=== December bowl games ===
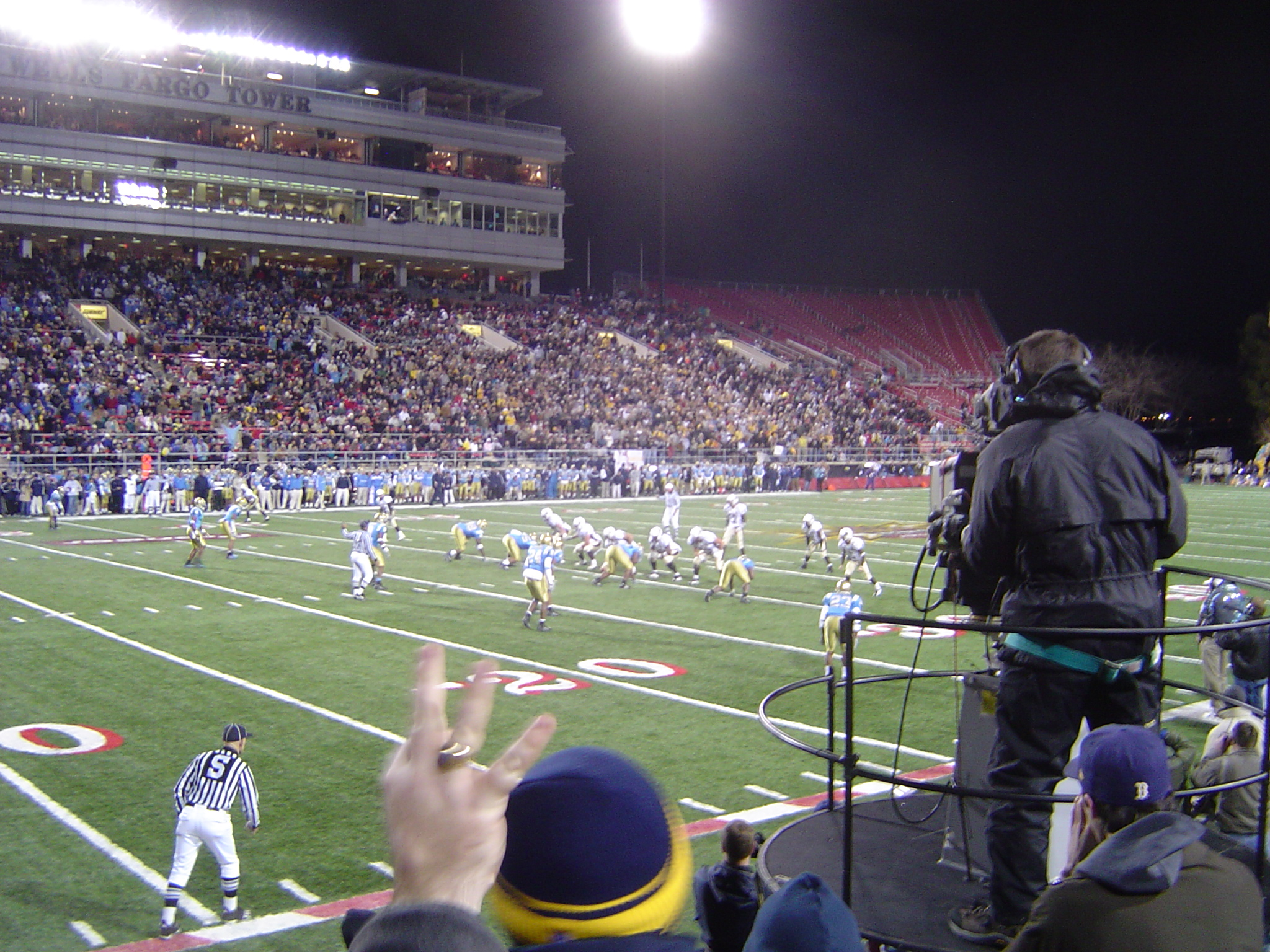
UCLA vs. Wyoming in the 2004 Las Vegas Bowl

- Peach Bowl: No. 14 Miami (FL) 27, No. 20 Florida 10
- Houston Bowl: Colorado 33, UTEP 28
- Liberty Bowl: (C-USA Champ) No. 7 Louisville 44, (WAC Champ) No. 10 Boise State 40
- MPC Computers Bowl: Fresno State 37, No. 18 Virginia 34 (OT)
- Continental Tire Bowl: No. 25 Boston College 37, North Carolina 24
- Independence Bowl: Iowa State 17, Miami (Ohio) 13
- Silicon Valley Classic: Northern Illinois 34, Troy State 21
- Sun Bowl: No. 21 Arizona State 27, Purdue 23
- Music City Bowl: Minnesota 20, Alabama 16
- Holiday Bowl: No. 23 Texas Tech 45, No. 4 California 31
- Emerald Bowl: Navy 34, New Mexico 19
- Alamo Bowl: No. 24 Ohio State 33, Oklahoma State 7
- Insight Bowl: Oregon State 38, Notre Dame 21
- Champs Sports Bowl: Georgia Tech 51, Syracuse 14
- Motor City Bowl: UConn 39, (MAC Champ) Toledo 10
- Hawaii Bowl: Hawaii 59, UAB 40
- Fort Worth Bowl: Cincinnati 32, Marshall 14
- Las Vegas Bowl: Wyoming 24, UCLA 21
- GMAC Bowl: Bowling Green 52, Memphis 35
- New Orleans Bowl: Southern Miss 31, (SBC Champ) North Texas 10

== Heisman Trophy voting ==
The Heisman Trophy is given to the year's most outstanding player

Player	School	Position	1st	2nd	3rd	Total
Matt Leinart	USC	QB	267	211	102	1,325
Adrian Peterson	Oklahoma	RB	154	180	175	997
Jason White	Oklahoma	QB	171	149	146	957
Alex Smith	Utah	QB	98	112	117	635
Reggie Bush	USC	RB	118	80	83	597
Cedric Benson	Texas	RB	12	41	69	187
Jason Campbell	Auburn	QB	21	24	51	162
J. J. Arrington	California	RB	10	33	19	115
Aaron Rodgers	California	QB	8	14	15	67
Braylon Edwards	Michigan	WR	3	13	27	62

== Other major awards ==
- Walter Camp Award (top player): Matt Leinart, USC
- Maxwell Award (top player): Jason White, Oklahoma
- AP Player of the Year: Matt Leinart, USC
- Lombardi Award (top linebacker): David Pollack, Georgia
- John Mackey Award (tight end): Heath Miller, Virginia
- Doak Walker Award (running back): Cedric Benson, Texas
- Chuck Bednarik Award (defensive player): David Pollack, Georgia
- Outland Trophy (interior lineman): Jammal Brown, Oklahoma
- Davey O'Brien Award (quarterback): Jason White, Oklahoma
- Johnny Unitas Award (Sr. quarterback): Jason White, Oklahoma
- Fred Biletnikoff Award (wide receiver): Braylon Edwards, Michigan
- Jim Thorpe Award (defensive back): Carlos Rogers, Auburn
- Lou Groza Award (placekicker): Mike Nugent, Ohio State
- Ray Guy Award (punter): Daniel Sepulveda, Baylor
- Paul "Bear" Bryant Award (Coach of the Year): Tommy Tuberville, Auburn
- The Home Depot Coach of the Year Award: Urban Meyer, Utah
- Bobby Dodd Coach of the Year Award: Paul Johnson, Navy

== Attendances ==
#	Team	Games	Total	Average
1	Michigan	6	666,149	111,025
2	Tennessee	7	746,507	106,644
3	Ohio State	6	629,257	104,876
4	Penn State	6	618,665	103,111
5	Georgia	6	556,476	92,746
6	LSU	7	638,462	91,209
7	Florida	6	530,453	88,409
8	Southern California	6	511,373	85,229
9	Oklahoma	6	507,189	84,532
10	Texas	6	498,566	83,094
11	Auburn	7	581,597	83,085
12	Florida State	6	497,047	82,841
13	Wisconsin	6	494,209	82,368
14	Alabama	7	573,092	81,870
15	Notre Dame	6	484,770	80,795
16	South Carolina	6	482,200	80,367
17	Clemson	6	478,000	79,667
18	Nebraska	6	466,153	77,692
19	Texas A&M	6	446,988	74,498
20	Michigan State	6	441,613	73,602
21	Iowa	6	422,382	70,397
22	Arkansas	6	409,275	68,213
23	Virginia Tech	7	455,805	65,115
24	Washington	6	388,423	64,737
25	California	5	320,095	64,019
26	Purdue	6	381,292	63,549
27	Arizona State	6	375,846	62,641
28	Kentucky	6	374,002	62,334
29	Virginia	6	368,963	61,494
30	UCLA	6	363,092	60,515
31	Missouri	6	357,424	59,571
32	Miami Hurricanes	6	354,803	59,134
33	BYU	6	350,849	58,475
34	Mississippi	6	350,237	58,373
35	Oregon	6	348,352	58,059
36	West Virginia	6	339,269	56,545
37	North Carolina State	6	337,200	56,200
38	Texas Tech	5	264,116	52,823
39	North Carolina	6	314,750	52,458
40	Maryland	6	308,463	51,411
41	Arizona	7	350,774	50,111
42	Illinois	7	340,381	48,626
43	Kansas State	7	338,833	48,405
44	Colorado	6	287,368	47,895
45	Minnesota	6	285,438	47,573
46	Georgia Tech	6	280,902	46,817
47	Oklahoma State	6	280,832	46,805
48	Utah	6	264,670	44,112
49	Mississippi State	7	306,545	43,792
50	Boston College	5	215,952	43,190
51	Pittsburgh	6	249,599	41,600
52	Iowa State	6	249,106	41,518
53	UTEP	6	247,256	41,209
54	Memphis	5	205,874	41,175
55	Kansas	6	246,399	41,067
56	Louisville	5	202,657	40,531
57	Fresno State	5	198,885	39,777
58	Connecticut	7	275,129	39,304
59	Air Force	7	266,302	38,043
60	New Mexico	5	186,408	37,282
61	Syracuse	5	185,341	37,068
62	Hawaii	8	294,404	36,801
63	Oregon State	5	181,672	36,334
64	San Diego State	5	179,976	35,995
65	Stanford	6	215,650	35,942
66	Washington State	4	139,531	34,883
67	Army	5	159,816	31,963
68	Navy	6	186,099	31,017
69	Rutgers	6	185,966	30,994
70	Wake Forest	6	184,575	30,763
71	East Carolina	5	153,418	30,684
72	Baylor	6	183,518	30,586
73	Boise State	7	213,493	30,499
74	TCU	6	176,477	29,413
75	Southern Miss	5	144,821	28,964
76	Vanderbilt	6	170,832	28,472
77	Northwestern	6	170,449	28,408
78	Indiana	5	141,887	28,377
79	Colorado State	6	163,776	27,296
80	USF	6	162,361	27,060
81	Northern Illinois	5	135,260	27,052
82	Marshall	5	129,664	25,933
83	Toledo	5	120,124	24,025
84	Tulane	6	136,976	22,829
85	Duke	5	112,524	22,505
86	UNLV	5	109,352	21,870
87	Louisiana-Lafayette	5	107,006	21,401
88	Cincinnati	5	106,275	21,255
89	Troy	5	106,140	21,228
90	Houston	5	105,834	21,167
91	UAB	5	103,032	20,606
92	UCF	5	99,761	19,952
93	Utah State	4	78,000	19,500
94	New Mexico State	5	91,506	18,301
95	SMU	5	88,530	17,706
96	Louisiana Tech	5	87,740	17,548
97	Bowling Green	5	87,114	17,423
98	Nevada	6	103,882	17,314
99	Tulsa	6	101,434	16,906
100	Idaho	4	66,478	16,620
101	Temple	6	98,736	16,456
102	Wyoming	6	98,477	16,413
103	Western Michigan	5	79,983	15,997
104	Ohio	5	79,893	15,979
105	Akron	5	79,243	15,849
106	Rice	5	78,926	15,785
107	Miami RedHawks	5	78,712	15,742
108	Arkansas State	4	61,307	15,327
109	North Texas	5	75,921	15,184
110	Central Michigan	5	75,216	15,043
111	Louisiana-Monroe	4	58,869	14,717
112	Eastern Michigan	5	71,937	14,387
113	Ball State	5	71,498	14,300
114	Middle Tennessee	5	66,938	13,388
115	Kent State	5	64,384	12,877
116	Buffalo	5	60,923	12,185
117	FAU	5	53,921	10,784
118	San Jose State	5	32,395	6,479

== See also ==
- BCS controversies#2004–05 season
