= 2004 Fort Worth Bowl =

2004 PlainsCapital Fort Worth Bowl
Marshall Thundering Herd	Cincinnati Bearcats
(6–5)	(6–5)
MAC	C-USA
14	32
Head coach: Bob Pruett	Head coach: Mark Dantonio
	1	2	3	4	Total
Marshall	14	0	0	0	14
Cincinnati	10	14	0	8	32
- Date: December 23, 2004
- Season: 2004
- Stadium: Amon G. Carter Stadium
- Location: Fort Worth, Texas
- MVP: Gino Guidugli (QB, Cincinnati) & Josh Davis (WR, Marshall)
- Referee: Steve Usechek (Big XII)
- Attendance: 27,902
- Payout: US$750,000

United States TV coverage
- Network: ESPN
- Announcers: Sean McDonough (Play-by-Play); Craig James (Analyst); Jimmy Dykes (Sidelines)

The 2004 edition to the Fort Worth Bowl, the second edition, featured the Marshall Thundering Herd, and the Cincinnati Bearcats. It had a title sponsor of PlainsCapital Bank. The game was particularly notable because it featured an incoming school (Marshall) to and outgoing school (Cincinnati) from Conference USA.

Cincinnati scored first, when Antauwn Gibbons recovered a blocked punt, and rushed it in 9 yards for a touchdown, giving Cincinnati an early 7–0 lead. Kevin Lovell added a 23-yard field goal to give Cincinnati a 10–0 lead. Marshall got on the scoreboard following a 14-yard touchdown pass from quarterback Stan Hill to wide receiver Josh Davis making it 10–7. They later took the lead when cornerback Willie Smith intercepted a pass, and returned it 32 yards for a touchdown, putting Marshall on top 14–10.

The second quarter belonged to Cincinnati. Quarterback Gino Guidugli fired a 15-yard touchdown pass to wide receiver Brent Celek to put Cincinnati back on top 17–14. He later threw another touchdown pass to Earnest Jackson increasing Cincinnati's lead to 24–14. That score stood up at halftime. After a scoreless third quarter, Cincinnati scored two field goals and recorded a safety to make the final margin 32–14.
