= 2004 Independence Bowl =

Miami RedHawks	Iowa State Cyclones
(8–4)	(6–5)
MAC	Big 12
13	17
Head coach: Terry Hoeppner	Head coach: Dan McCarney
	1	2	3	4	Total
Miami	0	7	6	0	13
Iowa State	7	3	0	7	17
- Date: December 28, 2004
- Season: 2004
- Stadium: Independence Stadium
- Location: Shreveport, Louisiana
- MVP: QB Bret Meyer (Iowa State); DB Nick Moser (Iowa State)
- Referee: Bill LeMonnier (Big Ten)
- Attendance: 43,076
- Payout: US$2,400,000

United States TV coverage
- Network: ESPN
- Announcers: Dave Barnett, David Norrie and Bill Curry

The 2004 Independence Bowl was a post-season college football bowl game between the Iowa State Cyclones and the Miami RedHawks on December 28, 2004, at Independence Stadium in Shreveport, Louisiana. It was the twenty-ninth time the Independence Bowl had been played and the final game of the 2004 NCAA Division I FBS football season for both teams. Iowa State defeated Miami 17–13.

== Background ==
Typically the Independence Bowl featured teams from the Southeastern Conference and Big 12 Conference, but the entire post-season bowl picture was thrown into chaos after a brawl between Clemson (Atlantic Coast Conference) and South Carolina (SEC) caused both teams, which had been bowl eligible, to remove themselves from consideration. With the SEC no longer able to supply enough bowl-eligible teams, Independence Bowl organizers looked elsewhere, and settled on Miami, coming off a second consecutive East Division championship in the Mid-American Conference.

Iowa State came back from a 2–10 2003 season to finish 6–5. A Big 12 team, Iowa State normally would have gone to the Houston Bowl, but with fellow conference members Texas and Oklahoma headed for BCS bowls the remaining Big 12 teams received bids to better games. Iowa State accepted the bid on December 6, 2004. Iowa State previously played in the 2001 Independence Bowl, losing in the last seconds to Alabama 14–13.

== Game summary ==
- Iowa State – Hicks 4-yard touchdown run (Culbertson kick)
- Iowa State – Culbertson 23 yd field goal
- Miami (Ohio) – Clemens 28-yard touchdown pass from Betts (Parseghian kick)
- Miami (Ohio) – Smith 2-yard touchdown run (Soderquist kick blocked)
- Iowa State – Kock 1-yard touchdown run (Culbertson kick)

Bret Meyer threw 10-of-28 for 144 yards, but he also rushed for 122 yards on 23 carries in an MVP effort.

== Statistics ==
Statistics	Miami (Ohio)	Iowa State
First downs	18	22
Rushing yards	60	295
Passes (C-A-I)	20–44–1	10–28–0
Passing yards	240	114
Total yards	300	409
Punts-Average	8–45.4	7–37.9
Fumbles-Lost	1–0	0–0
Penalties-Yards	7–48	7–71
Third down conv.	2–13	9–20
Possession time	29:27	30:33
