= 2004 Kent State Golden Flashes football team =

American college football season

2004 Kent State Golden Flashes football
- Conference: Mid-American Conference
- East
- Record: 5–6 (4–4 MAC)
- Head coach: Doug Martin (1st season)
- Offensive scheme: Air raid
- Defensive coordinator: Pete Rekstis (1st season)
- Base defense: 4–3
- Home stadium: Dix Stadium

2004 Mid-American Conference football standings
	Conf.			Overall
Team	W		L	W		L
East Division
Miami (OH) x	7	–	1	8	–	5
Akron	6	–	2	6	–	5
Marshall	6	–	2	6	–	6
Kent State	4	–	4	5	–	6
Ohio	2	–	6	4	–	7
Buffalo	2	–	6	2	–	9
UCF	0	–	8	0	–	11
West Division
Toledo xy$	7	–	1	9	–	4
Northern Illinois x	7	–	1	9	–	3
Bowling Green	6	–	2	9	–	3
Eastern Michigan	4	–	4	4	–	7
Central Michigan	3	–	5	4	–	7
Ball State	2	–	6	2	–	9
Western Michigan	0	–	8	1	–	10
Championship: Toledo 35, Miami 27
$ – Conference champion; x – Division champion/co-champions; y – Championship game participant

The 2004 Kent State Golden Flashes football team represented the Kent State University during the 2004 NCAA Division I-A football season. Kent State competed as a member of the Mid-American Conference (MAC), and played their home games at Dix Stadium. The Golden Flashes were led by first-year head coach Doug Martin.

== Schedule ==
Date	Time	Opponent	Site	TV	Result	Attendance	Source
September 4	12:00 pm	at No. 13 Iowa*	Kinnick Stadium; Iowa City, IA	ESPN Plus	L 7–39	70,397	
September 11	7:00 pm	Liberty (I-AA)*	Dix Stadium; Kent, OH		W 38–10	17,459	
September 18	7:00 pm	at Rutgers*	Rutgers Stadium; Piscataway, NJ	FSN	L 21–29	25,415	
September 23	7:00 pm	Akron	Dix Stadium; Kent, OH (Wagon Wheel)		L 19–24	25,186	
October 2	1:00 pm	at Central Michigan	Kelly/Shorts Stadium; Mount Pleasant, MI		L 21–24	12,292	
October 9	2:00 pm	at Miami (OH)	Yager Stadium; Oxford, OH		L 27–47	18,625	
October 16	4:00 pm	Marshall^{†}	Dix Stadium; Kent, OH		L 17–27	9,752	
October 30	4:00 pm	Ohio	Dix Stadium; Kent, OH		W 42–16	6,013	
November 4	1:30 pm	at Buffalo	University at Buffalo Stadium; Amherst, NY		W 33–7	6,454	
November 13	4:00 pm	Eastern Michigan	Dix Stadium; Kent, OH		W 69–17	5,974	
November 23	7:00 pm	at UCF	Florida Citrus Bowl; Orlando, FL		W 41–24	12,083	
*Non-conference game; ^{†}Homecoming; Rankings from AP Poll released prior to the game; All times are in Eastern time
