= 2004 Central Michigan Chippewas football team =

American college football season

2004 Central Michigan Chippewas football
- Conference: Mid-American Conference
- West Division
- Record: 4–7 (3–5 MAC)
- Head coach: Brian Kelly (1st season)
- Offensive coordinator: Jeff Quinn (1st season)
- MVP: Jerry Seymour
- Home stadium: Kelly/Shorts Stadium

2004 Mid-American Conference football standings
	Conf.			Overall
Team	W		L	W		L
East Division
Miami (OH) x	7	–	1	8	–	5
Akron	6	–	2	6	–	5
Marshall	6	–	2	6	–	6
Kent State	4	–	4	5	–	6
Ohio	2	–	6	4	–	7
Buffalo	2	–	6	2	–	9
UCF	0	–	8	0	–	11
West Division
Toledo xy$	7	–	1	9	–	4
Northern Illinois x	7	–	1	9	–	3
Bowling Green	6	–	2	9	–	3
Eastern Michigan	4	–	4	4	–	7
Central Michigan	3	–	5	4	–	7
Ball State	2	–	6	2	–	9
Western Michigan	0	–	8	1	–	10
Championship: Toledo 35, Miami 27
$ – Conference champion; x – Division champion/co-champions; y – Championship game participant

The 2004 Central Michigan Chippewas football team was an American football team that represented Central Michigan University in the Mid-American Conference (MAC) during the 2004 NCAA Division I-A football season. In their first season under head coach Brian Kelly, the Chippewas compiled a 4–7 record (3–5 against MAC opponents), finished in fifth place in the MAC's West Division, and were outscored by their opponents, 378 to 260. The team played its home games in Kelly/Shorts Stadium in Mount Pleasant, Michigan, with attendance of 75,216 in five home games.

The team's statistical leaders included Kent Smith with 2,284 passing yards, Jerry Seymour with 1,284 rushing yards, and Damien Linson with 574 receiving yards. Tailback Jerry Seymour was selected at the end of the 2004 season as the team's most valuable player.

Brian Kelly was introduced as Central Michigan's head football coach on January 2, 2004. He had served as the head football coach at Grand Valley State University for 13 years, compiling a 118-35-2 record and leading his Lakers football teams to NCAA Division II national championships in both 2002 and 2003.

NFL coaches Matt LaFleur and Robert Saleh were graduate assistants on this team.

== Schedule ==
Date	Opponent	Site	Result	Attendance	Source
September 4	at Indiana*	Memorial Stadium; Bloomington, IN	L 10–41	36,041	
September 11	at Michigan State*	Spartan Stadium; East Lansing, MI	L 7–24	72,908	
September 18	Southeast Missouri State*	Kelly/Shorts Stadium; Mount Pleasant, MI	W 44–27	15,255	
October 2	Kent State	Kelly/Shorts Stadium; Mount Pleasant, MI	W 24–21	12,292	
October 9	Bowling Green	Kelly/Shorts Stadium; Mount Pleasant, MI	L 14–38	17,413	
October 16	at Northern Illinois	Huskie Stadium; DeKalb, IL	L 10–42	27,385	
October 23	at Toledo	Glass Bowl; Toledo, OH	L 22–27	19,822	
October 30	Western Michigan	Kelly/Shorts Stadium; Mount Pleasant, MI (rivalry)	W 24–21 ^{OT}	19,369	
November 6	vs. Eastern Michigan	Ford Field; Detroit, MI (rivalry)	L 58–61 ^{4OT}	24,423	
November 13	at Buffalo	University at Buffalo Stadium; Amherst, NY	L 6–36	6,490	
November 20	Ball State	Kelly/Shorts Stadium; Mount Pleasant, MI	W 41–40	10,169	
*Non-conference game
