= 2004 UCF Golden Knights football team =

American college football season

2004 UCF Golden Knights football
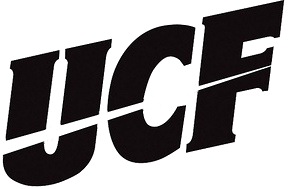
- Conference: Mid-American Conference
- East Division
- Record: 0–11 (0–8 MAC)
- Head coach: George O'Leary (1st season)
- Offensive coordinator: Tim Salem (1st season)
- Defensive coordinator: Lance Thompson (1st season)
- Home stadium: Citrus Bowl

2004 Mid-American Conference football standings
	Conf.			Overall
Team	W		L	W		L
East Division
Miami (OH) x	7	–	1	8	–	5
Akron	6	–	2	6	–	5
Marshall	6	–	2	6	–	6
Kent State	4	–	4	5	–	6
Ohio	2	–	6	4	–	7
Buffalo	2	–	6	2	–	9
UCF	0	–	8	0	–	11
West Division
Toledo xy$	7	–	1	9	–	4
Northern Illinois x	7	–	1	9	–	3
Bowling Green	6	–	2	9	–	3
Eastern Michigan	4	–	4	4	–	7
Central Michigan	3	–	5	4	–	7
Ball State	2	–	6	2	–	9
Western Michigan	0	–	8	1	–	10
Championship: Toledo 35, Miami 27
$ – Conference champion; x – Division champion/co-champions; y – Championship game participant

The 2004 UCF Golden Knights football team represented the University of Central Florida in the 2004 NCAA Division I-A football season. Their head coach was George O'Leary, in his first season with the team. It was their last year in the Mid-American Conference, in the East Division. The Golden Knights would join Conference USA for the 2005 season.

The Golden Knights went 0–11, their worst season in program history (though since surpassed by the 2015 team that went 0-12). Including the four losses to end the 2003 season, UCF finished the 2004 season on a 15-game losing streak.

== Schedule ==
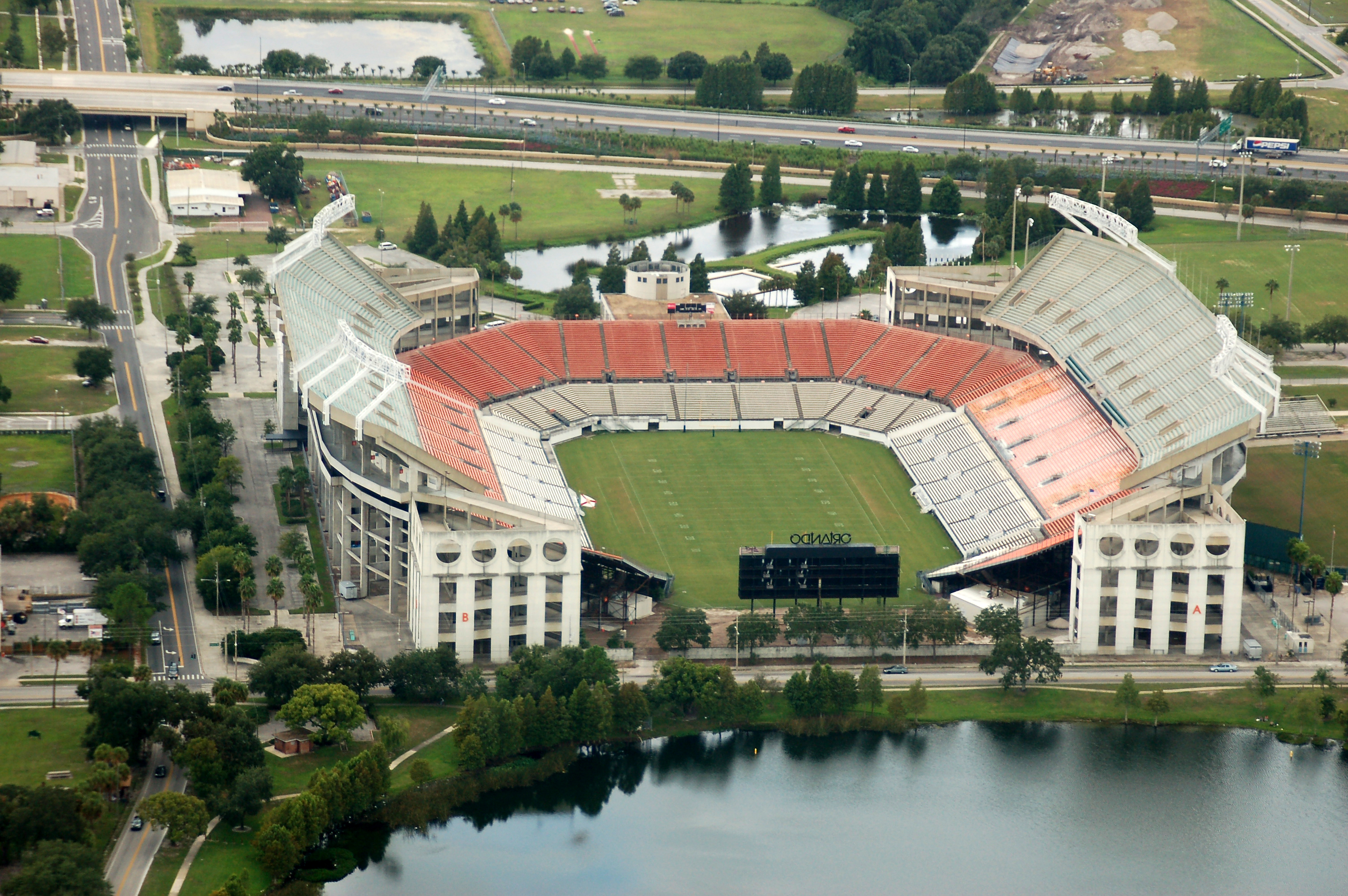
The Citrus Bowl, the Knights home field

Date	Time	Opponent	Site	TV	Result	Attendance
September 4	12:00pm	at No. 21 Wisconsin*	Camp Randall Stadium; Madison, WI	ESPN	L 6–34	82,116
September 11	6:00pm	No. 10 West Virginia*	Citrus Bowl; Orlando, FL		L 20–45	32,224
September 18	12:00pm	at Penn State*	Beaver Stadium; University Park, PA	ESPN Plus	L 13–37	101,715
October 2	1:00pm	at Buffalo	University at Buffalo Stadium; Buffalo, NY		L 20–48	12,173
October 9	6:00pm	Northern Illinois	Citrus Bowl; Orlando, FL		L 28–30	16,555
October 16	6:00pm	Akron	Citrus Bowl; Orlando, FL		L 21–26	18,401
October 23	7:00pm	at Miami (OH)	Yager Stadium; Oxford, OH	ESPN Plus	L 7–43	8,012
October 30	2:30pm	at Marshall	Joan C. Edwards Stadium; Huntington, WV	SUN	L 3–20	23,122
November 6	4:00pm	Ohio^{†}	Citrus Bowl; Orlando, FL		L 16–17 ^{OT}	20,498
November 13	4:00pm	at Ball State	Ball State Stadium; Muncie, IN		L 17–21	5,309
November 23	7:00pm	Kent State	Citrus Bowl; Orlando, FL		L 24–41	12,083
*Non-conference game; ^{†}Homecoming; Rankings from AP Poll released prior to the game; All times are in Eastern time

== Roster ==
2004 UCF Golden Knights football team roster
Players
Coaches
Offense

Pos.	#	Name	Class
WR	7	Tavaris Capers	Sr
TE	86	Antonio Eldemire	Jr
RB	21	Curtis Francis	Fr
C	53	Cedric Gagné-Marcoux	So
RB	4	Alex Haynes	Sr
WR	5	Luther Huggins	Sr
QB	7	Kyle Israel	Fr
TE	83	Harvey Joiner	Sr
TE	84	Darcy Johnson	Jr
WR	81	Brandon Marshall	Jr
QB	9	Steven Moffett	So
WR	25	Al Peterson	Jr
G	70	Josh Sitton	Fr
QB	12	Brandon Summer	Jr
WR	15	Brooks Turner	So
RB	20	Dontavius Wilcox	So

Defense

Pos.	#	Name	Class
FS	24	Atari Bigby	Sr
DE	95	Paul Carrington	Jr
DB	33	Travis Holmes	So
SS	40	Travonti Johnson	So
DB	25	Rashad Mays	Jr
DB	28	Renford Parkes	Fr
DT	74	Keith Shologan	Fr
CB	11	Mike Sims-Walker	So

Special teams

Pos.	#	Name	Class
K	16	John Brown
K	2	Matt Prater	Jr

Head coach

- George O'Leary

Coordinators/assistant coaches

- Tim Salem
  (Offensive coordinator & quarterbacks)

Legend

- (C) Team captain
- (S) Suspended
- (I) Ineligible
- Injured
- Redshirt
