= 2004 Northern Illinois Huskies football team =

American college football season

2004 Northern Illinois Huskies football

MAC West Division co-champion Silicon Valley Football Classic champion

Silicon Valley Football Classic, W 34–21 vs. Troy
- Conference: Mid-American Conference
- West Division
- Record: 9–3 (7–1 MAC)
- Head coach: Joe Novak (9th season)
- Offensive coordinator: John Bond (1st season)
- Defensive coordinator: Denny Doornbos (1st season)
- MVPs: Garrett Wolfe; Brian Atkinson
- Captains: Brian Atkinson; Josh Haldi; Lionel Hickenbottom; Jake VerStraete
- Home stadium: Huskie Stadium

2004 Mid-American Conference football standings
	Conf.			Overall
Team	W		L	W		L
East Division
Miami (OH) x	7	–	1	8	–	5
Akron	6	–	2	6	–	5
Marshall	6	–	2	6	–	6
Kent State	4	–	4	5	–	6
Ohio	2	–	6	4	–	7
Buffalo	2	–	6	2	–	9
UCF	0	–	8	0	–	11
West Division
Toledo xy$	7	–	1	9	–	4
Northern Illinois x	7	–	1	9	–	3
Bowling Green	6	–	2	9	–	3
Eastern Michigan	4	–	4	4	–	7
Central Michigan	3	–	5	4	–	7
Ball State	2	–	6	2	–	9
Western Michigan	0	–	8	1	–	10
Championship: Toledo 35, Miami 27
$ – Conference champion; x – Division champion/co-champions; y – Championship game participant

The 2004 Northern Illinois Huskies football team represented Northern Illinois University as a member of the West Division of the Mid-American Conference (MAC) during the 2004 NCAA Division I-A football season. Led by ninth-year head coach Joe Novak, the Huskies compiled an overall record of 9–3 with a mark of 7–1 in conference play, sharing the MAC's West Division title with Toledo. By virtue of their head-to-head win Northern Illinois, Toledo Rockets advanced to the MAC Championship Game. Northern Illinois was invited to the Silicon Valley Football Classic, where they beat Troy. The team played home games at Huskie Stadium in DeKalb, Illinois.

== Schedule ==
Date	Time	Opponent	Site	TV	Result	Attendance	Source
September 4	5:00 pm	at No. 22 Maryland*	Byrd Stadium; College Park, MD		L 20–23	51,830	
September 11	3:00 pm	Southern Illinois*	Huskie Stadium; DeKalb, IL	CSNC	W 23–22	28,071	
September 18	11:30 am	at Iowa State*	Jack Trice Stadium; Ames, IA	FSN	L 41–48	39,902	
September 24	6:00 pm	Bowling Green	Huskie Stadium; DeKalb, IL	ESPN2	W 34–17	25,819	
October 2	3:00 pm	Akron	Huskie Stadium; DeKalb, IL	CSNC	W 49–19	26,266	
October 9	5:00 pm	at UCF	Florida Citrus Bowl; Orlando, FL		W 30–28	16,555	
October 16	3:00 pm	Central Michigan^{†}	Huskie Stadium; DeKalb, IL	CSNC	W 42–10	27,385	
October 23	2:00 pm	at Western Michigan	Waldo Stadium; Kalamazoo, MI	ESPN Plus	W 59–38	14,461	
October 30	3:00 pm	at Ball State	Ball State Stadium; Muncie, IN (rivalry)	CSNC	W 38–31 ^{OT}	10,149	
November 9	6:30 pm	Toledo	Huskie Stadium; DeKalb, IL	ESPN2	L 17–31	27,719	
November 20	12:00 pm	at Eastern Michigan	Rynearson Stadium; Ypsilanti, MI	CSNC	W 34–16	4,251	
December 30	10:00 pm	vs. Troy*	Spartan Stadium; San Jose, CA (Silicon Valley Football Classic)	ESPN2	W 34–21	21,456	
*Non-conference game; ^{†}Homecoming; Rankings from AP Poll released prior to the game; All times are in Central time
