= 2004 Western Michigan Broncos football team =

American college football season

2004 Western Michigan Broncos football
- Conference: Mid-American Conference
- West Division
- Record: 1–10 (0–8 MAC)
- Head coach: Gary Darnell (8th season)
- Offensive coordinator: Brian Rock (5th season)
- Home stadium: Waldo Stadium

2004 Mid-American Conference football standings
	Conf.			Overall
Team	W		L	W		L
East Division
Miami (OH) x	7	–	1	8	–	5
Akron	6	–	2	6	–	5
Marshall	6	–	2	6	–	6
Kent State	4	–	4	5	–	6
Ohio	2	–	6	4	–	7
Buffalo	2	–	6	2	–	9
UCF	0	–	8	0	–	11
West Division
Toledo xy$	7	–	1	9	–	4
Northern Illinois x	7	–	1	9	–	3
Bowling Green	6	–	2	9	–	3
Eastern Michigan	4	–	4	4	–	7
Central Michigan	3	–	5	4	–	7
Ball State	2	–	6	2	–	9
Western Michigan	0	–	8	1	–	10
Championship: Toledo 35, Miami 27
$ – Conference champion; x – Division champion/co-champions; y – Championship game participant

The 2004 Western Michigan Broncos football team represented Western Michigan University in the 2004 NCAA Division I-A football season. They competed as members of the Mid-American Conference in the West Division. The team was coached by Gary Darnell, who was fired after the end of the season, and played their home games at Waldo Stadium in Kalamazoo, Michigan.

== Schedule ==
Date	Time	Opponent	Site	TV	Result	Attendance	Source
September 2	8:00 pm	Tennessee–Martin*	Waldo Stadium; Kalamazoo, MI		W 42–0	21,643	
September 11	1:00 pm	at Virginia Tech*	Lane Stadium; Blacksburg, VA		L 0–63	65,115	
September 18	2:00 pm	at Illinois*	Memorial Stadium; Champaign, IL		L 27–30	51,452	
September 25	8:00 pm	at Ball State	Ball State Stadium; Muncie, IN		L 14–41	17,710	
October 9	6:00 pm	Toledo	Waldo Stadium; Kalamazoo, MI		L 33–59	17,421	
October 16	12:30 pm	Eastern Michigan^{†}	Waldo Stadium; Kalamazoo, MI (Michigan MAC Trophy)	CL	L 31–35	14,488	
October 23	3:00 pm	Northern Illinois	Waldo Stadium; Kalamazoo, MI	ESPN Plus	L 38–59	14,461	
October 30	1:00 pm	at Central Michigan	Kelly/Shorts Stadium; Mount Pleasant, MI (rivalry)		L 21–24 ^{OT}	19,369	
November 6	1:00 pm	at Bowling Green	Doyt Perry Stadium; Bowling Green, OH	ESPN Plus	L 0–52	18,439	
November 13	3:30 pm	Miami (OH)	Waldo Stadium; Kalamazoo, MI	CL	L 21–42	11,970	
November 20	4:30 pm	at Marshall	Joan C. Edwards Stadium; Huntington, WV		L 21–31	19,803	
*Non-conference game; ^{†}Homecoming; All times are in Eastern time
