= 2004 Marshall Thundering Herd football team =

American college football season

2004 Marshall Thundering Herd football

Fort Worth Bowl, L 14–32 vs. Cincinnati
- Conference: Mid-American Conference
- East
- Record: 6–6 (6–2 MAC)
- Head coach: Bob Pruett (9th season)
- Offensive coordinator: Mark McHale (3rd season)
- Co-offensive coordinator: Larry Kueck (4th season)
- Defensive coordinator: Bill Wilt (3rd season)
- Home stadium: Joan C. Edwards Stadium

2004 Mid-American Conference football standings
| | Conf. | | | Overall |
| Team | W | | L | W | | L |
|---|---|---|---|---|---|---|
East Division
| Miami (OH) x | 7 | – | 1 | 8 | – | 5 |
| Akron | 6 | – | 2 | 6 | – | 5 |
| Marshall | 6 | – | 2 | 6 | – | 6 |
| Kent State | 4 | – | 4 | 5 | – | 6 |
| Ohio | 2 | – | 6 | 4 | – | 7 |
| Buffalo | 2 | – | 6 | 2 | – | 9 |
| UCF | 0 | – | 8 | 0 | – | 11 |
West Division
| Toledo xy$ | 7 | – | 1 | 9 | – | 4 |
| Northern Illinois x | 7 | – | 1 | 9 | – | 3 |
| Bowling Green | 6 | – | 2 | 9 | – | 3 |
| Eastern Michigan | 4 | – | 4 | 4 | – | 7 |
| Central Michigan | 3 | – | 5 | 4 | – | 7 |
| Ball State | 2 | – | 6 | 2 | – | 9 |
| Western Michigan | 0 | – | 8 | 1 | – | 10 |
Championship: Toledo 35, Miami 27
$ – Conference champion; x – Division champion/co-champions; y – Championship game participant

The 2004 Marshall Thundering Herd football team represented Marshall University in the 2004 NCAA Division I-A football season. Marshall competed as a member of the East Division of Mid-American Conference, and played their home games at Joan C. Edwards Stadium. They were coached by Bob Pruett, who would retire from coaching at the end of the season.

== Schedule ==
| Date | Time | Opponent | Site | TV | Result | Attendance |
|---|---|---|---|---|---|---|
| September 4 | 4:30 pm | Troy* | Joan C. Edwards Stadium; Huntington, WV | FSN | L 15–17 | 29,382 |
| September 11 | 3:30 pm | at No. 9 Ohio State* | Ohio Stadium; Columbus, OH | ABC | L 21–24 | 104,622 |
| September 18 | 1:00 pm | at No. 3 Georgia* | Sanford Stadium; Athens, GA | CSS | L 3–13 | 92,746 |
| September 29 | 7:00 pm | Miami (OH) | Joan C. Edwards Stadium; Huntington, WV | ESPN2 | W 33–25 | 27,229 |
| October 9 | 1:00 pm | at Ohio | Peden Stadium; Athens, OH (Battle for the Bell) | WSAZ | W 16–13 | 19,616 |
| October 16 | 4:00 pm | at Kent State | Dix Stadium; Kent, OH | WSAZ | W 27–17 | 9,752 |
| October 23 | 4:30 pm | Buffalo^{†} | Joan C. Edwards Stadium; Huntington, WV | FSN | W 48–14 | 30,128 |
| October 30 | 2:30 pm | UCF | Joan C. Edwards Stadium; Huntington, WV | WSAZ | W 20–3 | 23,122 |
| November 5 | 7:00 pm | at Akron | Rubber Bowl; Akron, OH | ESPN2 | L 28–31 | 29,621 |
| November 13 | 12:00 pm | at Bowling Green | Doyt Perry Stadium; Bowling Green, OH | FSN | L 35–56 | 18,187 |
| November 20 | 4:30 pm | Western Michigan | Joan C. Edwards Stadium; Huntington, WV | WSAZ | W 31–21 | 19,803 |
| December 23 | 6:30 pm | vs. Cincinnati* | Amon G. Carter Stadium; Fort Worth, TX (Fort Worth Bowl) | ESPN | L 14–32 | 27,902 |
*Non-conference game; ^{†}Homecoming; Rankings from AP Poll released prior to the game; All times are in Eastern time
