= 2004 Miami RedHawks football team =

American college football season

2004 Miami RedHawks football

MAC East Division champion

MAC Championship Game, L 27–35 vs. Toledo

Independence Bowl, L 13–17 vs. Iowa State
- Conference: Mid-American Conference
- East Division
- Record: 8–5 (7–1 MAC)
- Head coach: Terry Hoeppner (6th season)
- Offensive coordinator: Shane Montgomery (4th season)
- Offensive scheme: Multiple
- Co-defensive coordinators: Brian George (1st season); Joe Palcic (1st season)
- Base defense: 4–3
- Home stadium: Yager Stadium

2004 Mid-American Conference football standings
	Conf.			Overall
Team	W		L	W		L
East Division
Miami (OH) x	7	–	1	8	–	5
Akron	6	–	2	6	–	5
Marshall	6	–	2	6	–	6
Kent State	4	–	4	5	–	6
Ohio	2	–	6	4	–	7
Buffalo	2	–	6	2	–	9
UCF	0	–	8	0	–	11
West Division
Toledo xy$	7	–	1	9	–	4
Northern Illinois x	7	–	1	9	–	3
Bowling Green	6	–	2	9	–	3
Eastern Michigan	4	–	4	4	–	7
Central Michigan	3	–	5	4	–	7
Ball State	2	–	6	2	–	9
Western Michigan	0	–	8	1	–	10
Championship: Toledo 35, Miami 27
$ – Conference champion; x – Division champion/co-champions; y – Championship game participant

The 2004 Miami RedHawks football team represented the Miami University in the 2004 NCAA Division I-A football season. They played their home games at Yager Stadium in Oxford, Ohio and competed as members of the Mid-American Conference. The team was coached by head coach Terry Hoeppner, who resigned after the season to become the head coach at Indiana.

== Schedule ==
Date	Time	Opponent	Site	TV	Result	Attendance	Source
August 28	7:30 pm	Indiana State*	Yager Stadium; Oxford, OH	ESPN Plus	W 49–0	18,022	
September 4	12:00 pm	at No. 8 Michigan*	Michigan Stadium; Ann Arbor, MI	ABC	L 10–43	110,815	
September 11	7:00 pm	at Cincinnati*	Nippert Stadium; Cincinnati, OH (Victory Bell)		L 26–45	30,368	
September 18	2:00 pm	Ohio	Yager Stadium; Oxford, OH (Battle of the Bricks)	ESPN Plus	W 40–20	20,113	
September 29	7:00 pm	at Marshall	Joan C. Edwards Stadium; Huntington, WV	ESPN2	L 25–33	27,229	
October 9	2:00 pm	Kent State	Yager Stadium; Oxford, OH		W 47–27	18,625	
October 16	1:30 pm	at Buffalo	University at Buffalo Stadium; Amherst, NY		W 25–7	6,793	
October 23	7:00 pm	Central Florida^{†}	Yager Stadium; Oxford, OH	ESPN Plus	W 41–14	8,012	
November 2	7:30 pm	Toledo	Yager Stadium; Oxford, OH	ESPN2	W 23–16	13,940	
November 13	3:30 pm	at Western Michigan	Waldo Stadium; Kalamazoo, MI		W 42–21	11,970	
November 20	6:00 pm	at Akron	Rubber Bowl; Akron, OH	FSN	W 37–27	17,410	
December 2	7:45 pm	vs. Toledo	Ford Field; Detroit, MI (MAC Championship Game)	ESPN	L 27–35	22,138	
December 28	6:30 pm	vs. Iowa State*	Independence Stadium; Shreveport, LA (Independence Bowl)	ESPN	L 13–17	43,000	
*Non-conference game; ^{†}Homecoming; Rankings from AP Poll released prior to the game; All times are in Eastern time
