= 2004 Ohio Bobcats football team =

American college football season

2004 Ohio Bobcats football
- Conference: Mid-American Conference
- East
- Record: 4–7 (2–6 MAC)
- Head coach: Brian Knorr (4th season)
- Offensive coordinator: Phil Earley (1st season)
- Defensive coordinator: Tim DeRuyter (3rd in stint; 7th overall season)
- Home stadium: Peden Stadium

2004 Mid-American Conference football standings
	Conf.			Overall
Team	W		L	W		L
East Division
Miami (OH) x	7	–	1	8	–	5
Akron	6	–	2	6	–	5
Marshall	6	–	2	6	–	6
Kent State	4	–	4	5	–	6
Ohio	2	–	6	4	–	7
Buffalo	2	–	6	2	–	9
UCF	0	–	8	0	–	11
West Division
Toledo xy$	7	–	1	9	–	4
Northern Illinois x	7	–	1	9	–	3
Bowling Green	6	–	2	9	–	3
Eastern Michigan	4	–	4	4	–	7
Central Michigan	3	–	5	4	–	7
Ball State	2	–	6	2	–	9
Western Michigan	0	–	8	1	–	10
Championship: Toledo 35, Miami 27
$ – Conference champion; x – Division champion/co-champions; y – Championship game participant

The 2004 Ohio Bobcats football team represented Ohio University during the 2004 NCAA Division I-A football season. Ohio competed as a member of the Mid-American Conference (MAC). The Bobcats were led by fourth year head coach Brian Knorr, who was fired after the end of the season. They played their home games in Peden Stadium in Athens, Ohio.

== Schedule ==
Date	Time	Opponent	Site	TV	Result	Attendance
September 4	7:00 pm	VMI*	Peden Stadium; Athens, OH		W 42–14	17,527
September 11	7:00 pm	at Pittsburgh*	Heinz Field; Pittsburgh, PA		L 3–24	46,401
September 18	2:00 pm	at Miami (OH)	Yager Stadium; Oxford, OH (Battle of the Bricks)	ESPN+	L 20–40	20,113
September 25	7:00 pm	Buffalo	Peden Stadium; Athens, OH		W 34–0	14,627
October 2	7:00 pm	at Kentucky*	Commonwealth Stadium; Lexington, KY	ESPNGP	W 28–16	61,514
October 9	1:00 pm	Marshall	Peden Stadium; Athens, OH (Battle for the Bell)		L 13–16	19,616
October 16	12:00 pm	at Toledo	Glass Bowl; Toledo, OH	ESPN	L 13–31	21,522
October 23	2:00 pm	Bowling Green^{†}	Peden Stadium; Athens, OH		L 16–41	16,348
October 30	4:00 pm	at Kent State	Dix Stadium; Kent, OH		L 16–42	6,013
November 6	4:00 pm	at UCF	Citrus Bowl; Orlando, FL		W 17–16 ^{OT}	20,498
November 13	1:00 pm	Akron	Peden Stadium; Athens, OH		L 19–31	11,775
*Non-conference game; ^{†}Homecoming; All times are in Eastern time
