= 2004 Toledo Rockets football team =

American college football season

2004 Toledo Rockets football

MAC champion MAC West co-champion

MAC Championship Game, W 35–27 vs. Miami (OH)

Motor City Bowl, L 10–39 vs. Connecticut
- Conference: Mid-American Conference
- West Division
- Record: 9–4 (8–1 MAC)
- Head coach: Tom Amstutz (4th season)
- Offensive coordinator: Rob Spence (4th season)
- Offensive scheme: Spread
- Defensive coordinator: Lou West (4th season)
- Base defense: 4–4
- Home stadium: Glass Bowl

2004 Mid-American Conference football standings
	Conf.			Overall
Team	W		L	W		L
East Division
Miami (OH) x	7	–	1	8	–	5
Akron	6	–	2	6	–	5
Marshall	6	–	2	6	–	6
Kent State	4	–	4	5	–	6
Ohio	2	–	6	4	–	7
Buffalo	2	–	6	2	–	9
UCF	0	–	8	0	–	11
West Division
Toledo xy$	7	–	1	9	–	4
Northern Illinois x	7	–	1	9	–	3
Bowling Green	6	–	2	9	–	3
Eastern Michigan	4	–	4	4	–	7
Central Michigan	3	–	5	4	–	7
Ball State	2	–	6	2	–	9
Western Michigan	0	–	8	1	–	10
Championship: Toledo 35, Miami 27
$ – Conference champion; x – Division champion/co-champions; y – Championship game participant

The 2004 Toledo Rockets football team represented the University of Toledo during the 2004 NCAA Division I-A football season. They competed as a member of the Mid-American Conference (MAC) in the West Division. The Rockets were led by head coach Tom Amstutz. The Rockets offense scored 432 points while the defense allowed 404 points.

== Schedule ==
Date	Time	Opponent	Site	TV	Result	Attendance	Source
September 4	9:00 pm	at No. 25 Minnesota*	Hubert H. Humphrey Metrodome; Minneapolis, MN	ESPN2	L 21–63	45,144	
September 11	7:00 pm	at Kansas*	Memorial Stadium; Lawrence, KS		L 14–63	41,251	
September 18	6:00 pm	at Eastern Michigan	Rynearson Stadium; Ypsilanti, MI		W 42–32	16,061	
September 25	7:00 pm	Temple*	Glass Bowl; Toledo, OH		W 45–17	24,836	
October 2	7:00 pm	Ball State	Glass Bowl; Toledo, OH		W 52–14	21,933	
October 9	6:00 pm	at Western Michigan	Waldo Stadium; Kalamazoo, MI		W 59–33	17,421	
October 16	12:00 pm	Ohio	Glass Bowl; Toledo, OH		W 31–13	21,552	
October 23	7:00 pm	Central Michigan^{†}	Glass Bowl; Toledo, OH		W 27–22	19,822	
November 2	7:30 pm	at Miami (OH)	Yager Stadium; Oxford, OH	ESPN2	L 16–23	13,940	
November 9	7:30 pm	at Northern Illinois	Huskie Stadium; DeKalb, IL	ESPN2	W 31–17	27,719	
November 23	7:00 pm	Bowling Green	Glass Bowl; Toledo, OH (rivalry)	ESPN2	W 49–41	31,981	
December 2	7:45 pm	vs. Miami (OH)	Ford Field; Detroit, MI (MAC Championship Game)	ESPN	W 35–27	22,138	
December 27	5:30 pm	vs. Connecticut*	Ford Field; Detroit, MI (Motor City Bowl)	ESPN2	L 10–39	52,552	
*Non-conference game; ^{†}Homecoming; Rankings from AP Poll released prior to the game; All times are in Eastern time

== After the season ==
=== NFL draft ===
The following Rocket was selected in the 2005 NFL draft following the season.

Round	Pick	Player	Position	NFL club
3	100	Nick Kaczur	Guard	New England Patriots
