= 2004 Bowling Green Falcons football team =

American college football season

2004 Bowling Green Falcons football

GMAC Bowl champion

GMAC Bowl, W 52–35 vs. Memphis
- Conference: Mid-American Conference
- West
- Record: 9–3 (6–2 MAC)
- Head coach: Gregg Brandon (2nd season)
- Offensive coordinator: Greg Studrawa (2nd season)
- Offensive scheme: Spread
- Defensive coordinator: Tim Beckman (7th season)
- Base defense: 4–3
- Home stadium: Doyt Perry Stadium

2004 Mid-American Conference football standings
	Conf.			Overall
Team	W		L	W		L
East Division
Miami (OH) x	7	–	1	8	–	5
Akron	6	–	2	6	–	5
Marshall	6	–	2	6	–	6
Kent State	4	–	4	5	–	6
Ohio	2	–	6	4	–	7
Buffalo	2	–	6	2	–	9
UCF	0	–	8	0	–	11
West Division
Toledo xy$	7	–	1	9	–	4
Northern Illinois x	7	–	1	9	–	3
Bowling Green	6	–	2	9	–	3
Eastern Michigan	4	–	4	4	–	7
Central Michigan	3	–	5	4	–	7
Ball State	2	–	6	2	–	9
Western Michigan	0	–	8	1	–	10
Championship: Toledo 35, Miami 27
$ – Conference champion; x – Division champion/co-champions; y – Championship game participant

The 2004 Bowling Green Falcons football team represented Bowling Green State University in the 2004 NCAA Division I-A football season. The team was coached by Gregg Brandon and played their home games in Doyt Perry Stadium in Bowling Green, Ohio. It was the 86th season of play for the Falcons.

== Schedule ==
Date	Time	Opponent	Site	TV	Result	Attendance	Source
September 4	12:00 pm	at No. 2 Oklahoma*	Gaylord Family Oklahoma Memorial Stadium; Norman, OK	ABC	L 24–40	84,319	
September 11	6:00 pm	Southeast Missouri State*	Doyt Perry Stadium; Bowling Green, OH		W 49–10	23,088	
September 24	7:00 pm	at Northern Illinois	Huskie Stadium; DeKalb, IL	ESPN2	L 17–34	25,819	
October 2	2:00 pm	at Temple*	Lincoln Financial Field; Philadelphia, PA		W 70–16	12,316	
October 9	1:00 pm	at Central Michigan	Kelly/Shorts Stadium; Mount Pleasant, MI	ESPN Plus	W 38–14	17,413	
October 16	4:00 pm	Ball State^{†}	Doyt Perry Stadium; Bowling Green, OH		W 51–13	16,669	
October 23	2:00 pm	at Ohio	Peden Stadium; Athens, OH		W 41–16	16,348	
October 30	6:00 pm	Eastern Michigan	Doyt Perry Stadium; Bowling Green, OH		W 41–20	10,731	
November 6	1:00 pm	Western Michigan	Doyt Perry Stadium; Bowling Green, OH	ESPN Plus	W 52–0	18,439	
November 13	12:00 pm	Marshall	Doyt Perry Stadium; Bowling Green, OH	FSN	W 56–35	18,187	
November 23	7:00 pm	at Toledo	Glass Bowl; Toledo, OH (rivalry)	ESPN2	L 41–49	31,981	
December 22	8:00 pm	vs. Memphis*	Ladd–Peebles Stadium; Mobile, AL (GMAC Bowl)	ESPN	W 52–35	29,500	
*Non-conference game; ^{†}Homecoming; Rankings from AP Poll released prior to the game; All times are in Eastern time
