= 2004 Ball State Cardinals football team =

American college football season

2004 Ball State Cardinals football
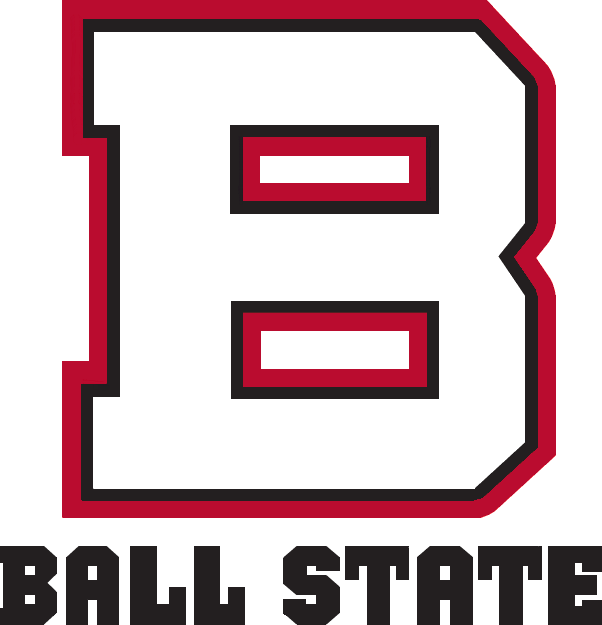
- Conference: Mid-American Conference
- West
- Record: 2–9 (2–6 MAC)
- Head coach: Brady Hoke (2nd season)
- Home stadium: Ball State Stadium

2004 Mid-American Conference football standings
	Conf.			Overall
Team	W		L	W		L
East Division
Miami (OH) x	7	–	1	8	–	5
Akron	6	–	2	6	–	5
Marshall	6	–	2	6	–	6
Kent State	4	–	4	5	–	6
Ohio	2	–	6	4	–	7
Buffalo	2	–	6	2	–	9
UCF	0	–	8	0	–	11
West Division
Toledo xy$	7	–	1	9	–	4
Northern Illinois x	7	–	1	9	–	3
Bowling Green	6	–	2	9	–	3
Eastern Michigan	4	–	4	4	–	7
Central Michigan	3	–	5	4	–	7
Ball State	2	–	6	2	–	9
Western Michigan	0	–	8	1	–	10
Championship: Toledo 35, Miami 27
$ – Conference champion; x – Division champion/co-champions; y – Championship game participant

The 2004 Ball State Cardinals football team represented Ball State University during the 2004 NCAA Division I-A football season. The Cardinals were led by second-year head coach Brady Hoke and played their home games at Ball State Stadium as members of the West Division of the Mid-American Conference (MAC). They finished the season 2–9, 2–6 in MAC play to finish in fifth place in the West Division.

== Schedule ==
Date	Time	Opponent	Site	TV	Result	Attendance	Source
September 2	8:00 p.m.	Boston College*	Ball State Stadium; Muncie, IN		L 11–19	23,718	
September 11	1:00 p.m.	at No. 25 Purdue*	Ross–Ade Stadium; West Lafayette, IN		L 7–59	64,323	
September 18	2:00 p.m.	at Missouri*	Faurot Field; Columbia, MO		L 0–48	57,279	
September 25	8:00 p.m.	Western Michigan	Ball State Stadium; Muncie, IN		W 41–14	17,710	
October 2	7:00 p.m.	at Toledo	Glass Bowl; Toledo, OH		L 14–52	21,933	
October 9	2:30 p.m.	Eastern Michigan	Ball State Stadium; Muncie, IN		L 24–31	14,612	
October 16	4:00 p.m.	at Bowling Green	Doyt Perry Stadium; Bowling Green, OH		L 13–51	16,669	
October 23	6:00 p.m.	at Akron	Rubber Bowl; Akron, OH		L 23–35	7,826	
October 30	4:00 p.m.	Northern Illinois	Ball State Stadium; Muncie, IN (rivalry)	CSNC	L 31–38 ^{OT}	10,149	
November 13	4:00 p.m.	UCF	Ball State Stadium; Muncie, IN		W 21–17	5,309	
November 20	1:00 p.m.	at Central Michigan	Kelly/Shorts Stadium; Mount Pleasant, MI		L 40–41	10,169	
*Non-conference game; Rankings from AP Poll released prior to the game; All times are in Eastern time
