= 2004 Eastern Michigan Eagles football team =

American college football season

2004 Eastern Michigan Eagles football
- Conference: Mid-American Conference
- West
- Record: 4–7 (4–4 MAC)
- Head coach: Jeff Genyk (1st season)
- Offensive coordinator: Howard Feggins (1st season)
- MVP: Eric Deslauriers
- Captain: Charles D. Livingston
- Home stadium: Rynearson Stadium

2004 Mid-American Conference football standings
	Conf.			Overall
Team	W		L	W		L
East Division
Miami (OH) x	7	–	1	8	–	5
Akron	6	–	2	6	–	5
Marshall	6	–	2	6	–	6
Kent State	4	–	4	5	–	6
Ohio	2	–	6	4	–	7
Buffalo	2	–	6	2	–	9
UCF	0	–	8	0	–	11
West Division
Toledo xy$	7	–	1	9	–	4
Northern Illinois x	7	–	1	9	–	3
Bowling Green	6	–	2	9	–	3
Eastern Michigan	4	–	4	4	–	7
Central Michigan	3	–	5	4	–	7
Ball State	2	–	6	2	–	9
Western Michigan	0	–	8	1	–	10
Championship: Toledo 35, Miami 27
$ – Conference champion; x – Division champion/co-champions; y – Championship game participant

The 2004 Eastern Michigan Eagles football team represented Eastern Michigan University in the 2004 NCAA Division I-A football season. In their first season under head coach Jeff Genyk, the Eagles compiled a 4–7 record, finished in fourth place in the West Division of the Mid-American Conference, and were outscored by their opponents 458 to 328. The team's statistical leaders included Matt Bohnet with 2,807 passing yards, Anthony Sherrell with 854 rushing yards, and Eric Deslauriers with 1,252 receiving yards. Eric Deslauriers received the team's most valuable player award.

== Schedule ==
Date	Opponent	Site	Result	Attendance	Source
September 2	Buffalo	Rynearson Stadium; Ypsilanti, MI	W 37–34	17,750	
September 11	at No. 11 Florida*	Ben Hill Griffin Stadium; Gainesville, FL	L 10–49	90,009	
September 18	Toledo	Rynearson Stadium; Ypsilanti, MI	L 32–42	16,061	
September 25	Eastern Illinois*	Rynearson Stadium; Ypsilanti, MI	L 28–31		
October 2	Idaho*^{†}	Rynearson Stadium; Ypsilanti, MI	L 41–45	18,920	
October 9	at Ball State	Scheumann Stadium; Muncie, IN	W 31–24	14,612	
October 16	at Western Michigan	Waldo Stadium; Kalamazoo, MI	W 35–31	14,488	
October 30	at Bowling Green	Doyt Perry Stadium; Bowling Green, OH	L 20–41	10,731	
November 6	vs. Central Michigan	Ford Field; Detroit, MI (rivalry)	W 61–58 ^{4OT}	24,423	
November 13	at Kent State	Dix Stadium; Kent, OH	L 17–69	5,974	
November 20	Northern Illinois	Rynearson Stadium; Ypsilanti, MI	L 16–34	4,251	
*Non-conference game; ^{†}Homecoming; Rankings from AP Poll released prior to the game

== Awards and MAC leaders ==
Andrew Wellock

- First Team All-MAC Offense
- 95 Points (5th)
- 33 Extra Point Attempts (Tied 5th)
- 32 Extra Points Made (Tied 5th)
- 23 Field Goal Attempts (1st)
- 21 Field Goals Made (1st)
- 91.3 Field Goal Percentage (1st)

Eric Deslauriers

- Second Team All-MAC Offense
- 84 Receptions (4th)
- 1,252 Receiving Yards (2nd)
- 13 Receiving Touchdowns (3rd)
- 13 Touchdowns From Scrimmage (4th)
- 13 Touchdowns (Tied 4th)

Anthony Sherrell

- Second Team All-MAC Offense
- 11 Rushing Touchdowns (Tied 4th)
- 12 Touchdowns From Scrimmage (Tied 5th)
- 12 Touchdowns (Tied 5th)

Kevin Harrison

- Second Team All-MAC Defense

Matt Bohnet

- 228 Pass Completions (5th)
- 434 Pass Attempts (3rd)
- 2,807 Passing Yards (4th)
- 21 Passing Touchdowns (4th)
- 12 Passing Interceptions (Tied 2nd)
- 534 Total Plays (2nd)
- 3,231 Total Yards (4th)
- 6.1 Total Yards Per Play (5th)
- 21 TD Responsible For (Tied 5th)

Trumaine Riley

- 20 Punt Returns (4th)
- 36 Kickoff Returns (1st)
- 552 Kickoff Return Yards (2nd)

Rontrell Woodruff

- 3 Interceptions (Tied 4th)

Steven Bednarik

- 2 Interceptions (Tied 5th)

== After the season ==
The following Eagle was selected in the 2005 NFL draft after the season.

Round	Pick	Player	Position	NFL club
7	237	Chris Roberson	Defensive back	Jacksonville Jaguars
