= 2004 Akron Zips football team =

American college football season

2004 Akron Zips football
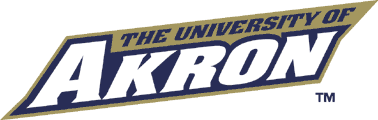
- Conference: Mid-American Conference
- East Division
- Record: 6–5 (6–2 MAC)
- Head coach: J. D. Brookhart (1st season)
- Offensive coordinator: Jim Pry (1st season)
- Defensive coordinator: Jim Fleming (1st season)
- Home stadium: Rubber Bowl

2004 Mid-American Conference football standings
	Conf.			Overall
Team	W		L	W		L
East Division
Miami (OH) x	7	–	1	8	–	5
Akron	6	–	2	6	–	5
Marshall	6	–	2	6	–	6
Kent State	4	–	4	5	–	6
Ohio	2	–	6	4	–	7
Buffalo	2	–	6	2	–	9
UCF	0	–	8	0	–	11
West Division
Toledo xy$	7	–	1	9	–	4
Northern Illinois x	7	–	1	9	–	3
Bowling Green	6	–	2	9	–	3
Eastern Michigan	4	–	4	4	–	7
Central Michigan	3	–	5	4	–	7
Ball State	2	–	6	2	–	9
Western Michigan	0	–	8	1	–	10
Championship: Toledo 35, Miami 27
$ – Conference champion; x – Division champion/co-champions; y – Championship game participant

The 2004 Akron Zips football team represented the University of Akron in the 2004 NCAA Division I-A football season. Akron competed as a member of the East Division of the Mid-American Conference (MAC). The Zips were led by J. D. Brookhart in his first year as head coach.

== Schedule ==
Date	Time	Opponent	Site	TV	Result	Attendance
September 4	3:30 p.m.	at Penn State*	Beaver Stadium; State College, PA	ESPN+	L 10–48	98,866
September 11	6:00 p.m.	Middle Tennessee*	Rubber Bowl; Akron, OH		L 24–31	17,263
September 18	3:00 p.m.	at No. 12 Virginia*	Scott Stadium; Charlottesville, VA		L 0–51	57,868
September 23	7:00 p.m.	at Kent State	Dix Stadium; Kent, OH (Battle for the Wagon Wheel)		W 24–19	25,186
October 2	4:00 p.m.	at Northern Illinois	Huskie Stadium; DeKalb, IL		L 19–49	26,266
October 9	6:00 p.m.	Buffalo	Rubber Bowl; Akron, OH		W 44–21	7,123
October 16	6:00 p.m.	at Central Florida	Citrus Bowl; Orlando, FL		W 26–21	18,401
October 23	6:00 p.m.	Ball State	Rubber Bowl; Akron, OH		W 35–23	7,826
November 5	7:00 p.m.	Marshall	Rubber Bowl; Akron, OH	ESPN2	W 31–28	29,621
November 13	1:00 p.m.	at Ohio	Peden Stadium; Athens, OH		W 31–19	11,775
November 20	6:00 p.m.	Miami (OH)	Rubber Bowl; Akron, OH		L 27–37	17,410
*Non-conference game; Rankings from AP Poll released prior to the game; All times are in Eastern time

== Roster ==
2004 Akron Zips football team roster
Players			Coaches
Offense: Pos. / # / Name / Class; QB / 5 / Charlie Frye / Sr	Defense: Pos. / # / Name / Class	Special teams: Pos. / # / Name / Class	Head coach: Lee Owens; Coordinators/assistant coaches Legend: (C) Team captain; (S) Suspended; (I) Ineligible; Injured; Redshirt
