= 2004 MAC Championship Game =

- Conference Championship
Toledo Rockets	Miami RedHawks
(8–3)	(8–3)
35	27
Head coach: Tom Amstutz	Head coach: Terry Hoeppner
	1	2	3	4	Total
Toledo	7	0	21	7	35
Miami	14	0	6	7	27
- Date: December 2, 2004
- Season: 2004
- Stadium: Ford Field
- Location: Detroit, Michigan
- MVP: QB Bruce Gradkowski (Toledo)
- Favorite: Miami by 1
- Referee: Stan Evans
- Attendance: 22,138

United States TV coverage
- Network: ESPN
- Announcers: Mike Tirico, Kirk Herbstreit, Lee Corso, Jill Arrington

2004 Mid-American Conference football standings
	Conf.			Overall
Team	W		L	W		L
East Division
Miami (OH) x	7	–	1	8	–	5
Akron	6	–	2	6	–	5
Marshall	6	–	2	6	–	6
Kent State	4	–	4	5	–	6
Ohio	2	–	6	4	–	7
Buffalo	2	–	6	2	–	9
UCF	0	–	8	0	–	11
West Division
Toledo xy$	7	–	1	9	–	4
Northern Illinois x	7	–	1	9	–	3
Bowling Green	6	–	2	9	–	3
Eastern Michigan	4	–	4	4	–	7
Central Michigan	3	–	5	4	–	7
Ball State	2	–	6	2	–	9
Western Michigan	0	–	8	1	–	10
Championship: Toledo 35, Miami 27
$ – Conference champion; x – Division champion/co-champions; y – Championship game participant

The 2004 MAC Championship Game was played on December 2, 2004, at Ford Field in Detroit, Michigan. The game featured the winner of each division of the Mid-American Conference. The game featured the Miami RedHawks, of the East Division, and the Toledo Rockets, of the West Division. The Rockets beat the RedHawks 35–27.
