= 2004 Buffalo Bulls football team =

American college football season

2004 Buffalo Bulls football
- Conference: Mid-American Conference
- East Division
- Record: 2–9 (2–6 MAC)
- Head coach: Jim Hofher (4th season)
- Captains: Bryan Cummings; J. J. Gibson; Matt Knueven; Erik Zeppuhar
- Home stadium: University at Buffalo Stadium

2004 Mid-American Conference football standings
| | Conf. | | | Overall |
| Team | W | | L | W | | L |
|---|---|---|---|---|---|---|
East Division
| Miami (OH) x | 7 | – | 1 | 8 | – | 5 |
| Akron | 6 | – | 2 | 6 | – | 5 |
| Marshall | 6 | – | 2 | 6 | – | 6 |
| Kent State | 4 | – | 4 | 5 | – | 6 |
| Ohio | 2 | – | 6 | 4 | – | 7 |
| Buffalo | 2 | – | 6 | 2 | – | 9 |
| UCF | 0 | – | 8 | 0 | – | 11 |
West Division
| Toledo xy$ | 7 | – | 1 | 9 | – | 4 |
| Northern Illinois x | 7 | – | 1 | 9 | – | 3 |
| Bowling Green | 6 | – | 2 | 9 | – | 3 |
| Eastern Michigan | 4 | – | 4 | 4 | – | 7 |
| Central Michigan | 3 | – | 5 | 4 | – | 7 |
| Ball State | 2 | – | 6 | 2 | – | 9 |
| Western Michigan | 0 | – | 8 | 1 | – | 10 |
Championship: Toledo 35, Miami 27
$ – Conference champion; x – Division champion/co-champions; y – Championship game participant

The 2004 Buffalo Bulls football team represented the University at Buffalo as a member of the Mid-American Conference (MAC) during the 2004 NCAA Division I-AA football season. Led by fourth-year head coach Jim Hofher, the Bulls compiled an overall record of 2–9 with a mark of 2–6 in conference play, tying for fifth place in the MAC's East Division. The team played home games at the University at Buffalo Stadium in Amherst, New York.

== Schedule ==
| Date | Time | Opponent | Site | TV | Result | Attendance | Source |
|---|---|---|---|---|---|---|---|
| September 2 | 7:00 pm | at Eastern Michigan | Rynearson Stadium; Ypsilanti, MI | | L 34–37 | 17,750 | |
| September 11 | 6:00 pm | Syracuse* | University at Buffalo Stadium; Amherst, NY | ESPNGP | L 17–37 | 29,013 | |
| September 18 | 9:00 pm | at Nevada* | Mackay Stadium; Reno, NV | | L 13–38 | 17,220 | |
| September 25 | 7:00 pm | at Ohio | Peden Stadium; Athens, OH | | L 0–34 | 14,627 | |
| October 2 | 6:00 pm | UCF | University at Buffalo Stadium; Amherst, NY | | W 48–20 | 12,173 | |
| October 9 | 6:00 pm | at Akron | Rubber Bowl; Akron, OH | | L 21–44 | 7,123 | |
| October 16 | 1:30 pm | Miami (OH)^{†} | University at Buffalo Stadium; Amherst, NY | | L 7–25 | 6,793 | |
| October 23 | 4:30 pm | at Marshall | Joan C. Edwards Stadium; Huntington, WV | Empire | L 14–48 | 30,128 | |
| November 6 | 1:30 pm | Kent State | University at Buffalo Stadium; Amherst, NY | | L 7–33 | 6,454 | |
| November 13 | 1:30 pm | Central Michigan | University at Buffalo Stadium; Amherst, NY | | W 36–6 | 6,490 | |
| November 20 | 12:00 pm | at Connecticut* | Rentschler Field; East Hartford, CT | | L 0–29 | 40,000 | |
*Non-conference game; ^{†}Homecoming; All times are in Eastern time
