= 2004–05 NCAA football bowl games =

College football postseason game series

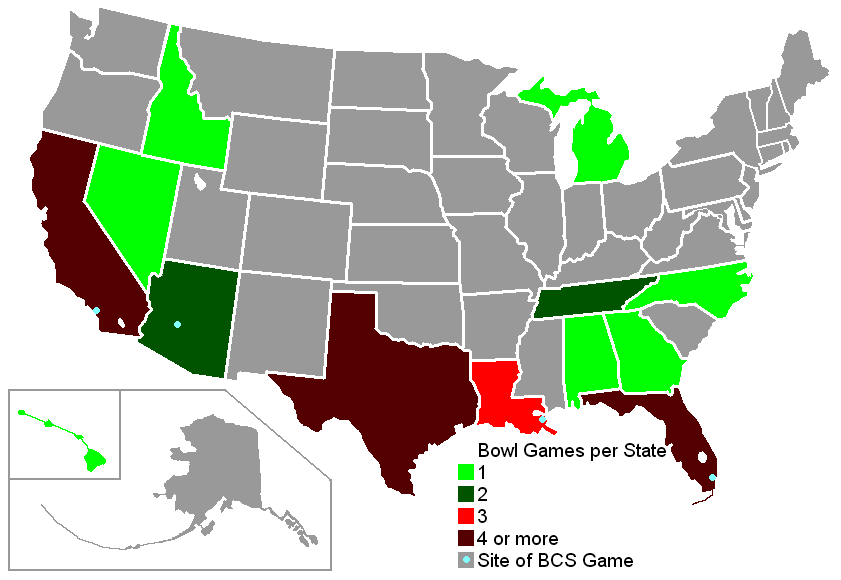
- Bowl sites by state
- Season: 2004
- Number of bowls: 28
- All-star games: 5
- Bowl games: December 14, 2004 – January 4, 2005
- National Championship: 2005 Orange Bowl
- Location of Championship: Dolphin Stadium, Miami Gardens, Florida
- Champions: Vacated
- Bowl Challenge Cup winner: Mountain West
Bowl record by conference
Conference	Bowls	Record	Final AP poll
Big 12	7	4–3 (0.571)	3
ACC	6	3–3 (0.500)	4
Big Ten	6	3–3 (0.500)	4
SEC	6	3–3 (0.500)	4
Conference USA	5	3–2 (0.600)	1
Pac-10	5	3–2 (0.600)	3
Big East	5	2–3 (0.400)	2
MAC	5	2–3 (0.400)	0
WAC	4	2–2 (0.500)	2
Mountain West	3	2–1 (0.667)	1
Independents	2	1–1 (0.500)	1
Sun Belt	2	0–2 (0.000)	0

The 2004–05 NCAA football bowl games were a series of 32 post-season games (including the Bowl Championship Series) played in December 2004 and January 2005 for Division I-A football teams and their all-stars. The post-season began with the New Orleans Bowl on December 14, 2004, and concluded on January 29, 2005, with the season-ending Senior Bowl.

A total of 28 team-competitive games, and five all-star games, were played. For the first time in three years, the 56 available bowl slots were filled by teams with winning records, as no teams with non-winning seasons (6–6, or .500) were invited to participate in bowl games.

== Schedule ==
-	Non-BCS Bowls				
Date	Time	Game	Site	Matchup	Ref.
Dec 14	7:30 PM	New Orleans Bowl	Louisiana Superdome; New Orleans, LA	Southern Miss 31, North Texas 10	
Dec 21	7:45 PM	Champs Sports Bowl	Florida Citrus Bowl; Orlando, FL	Georgia Tech 51, Syracuse 14	
Dec 22	8:00 PM	GMAC Bowl	Ladd–Peebles Stadium; Mobile, AL	Bowling Green 52, Memphis 35	
Dec 23	6:30 PM	Fort Worth Bowl	Amon G. Carter Stadium; Fort Worth, TX	Cincinnati 32, Marshall 14	
Dec 23	9:45 PM	Las Vegas Bowl	Sam Boyd Stadium; Whitney, NV	Wyoming 24, UCLA 21	
Dec 24	7:00 PM	Hawaii Bowl	Aloha Stadium; Honolulu, HI	Hawaii 59, UAB 40	
Dec 27	2:00 PM	MPC Computers Bowl	Bronco Stadium; Boise, ID	Fresno State 37, No. 18 Virginia 34	
Dec 27	5:30 PM	Motor City Bowl	Ford Field; Detroit, MI	Connecticut 39, Toledo 10	
Dec 28	6:30 PM	Independence Bowl	Independence Stadium; Shreveport, LA	Iowa State 17, Miami (OH) 13	
Dec 28	9:45 PM	Insight Bowl	Bank One Ballpark; Phoenix, AZ	Oregon State 38, Notre Dame 21	
Dec 29	4:30 PM	Houston Bowl	Reliant Stadium; Houston, TX	Colorado 33, UTEP 28	
Dec 29	8:00 PM	Alamo Bowl	Alamodome; San Antonio, TX	No. 24 Ohio State 33, Oklahoma State 7	
Dec 30	1:00 PM	Continental Tire Bowl	Ericsson Stadium; Charlotte, NC	No. 25 Boston College 37, North Carolina 24	
Dec 30	4:30 PM	Emerald Bowl	SBC Park; San Francisco, CA	Navy 34, New Mexico 19	
Dec 30	8:00 PM	Holiday Bowl	Qualcomm Stadium; San Diego, CA	No. 23 Texas Tech 45, No. 4 California 31	
Dec 30	11:00 PM	Silicon Valley Football Classic	Spartan Stadium; San Jose, CA	Northern Illinois 34, Troy 21	
Dec 31	12:00 PM	Music City Bowl	The Coliseum; Nashville, TN	Minnesota 20, Alabama 16	
Dec 31	2:00 PM	Sun Bowl	Sun Bowl; El Paso, TX	No. 21 Arizona State 27, Purdue 23	
Dec 31	3:30 PM	Liberty Bowl	Liberty Bowl Memorial Stadium; Memphis, TN	No. 7 Louisville 44, No. 10 Boise State 40	
Dec 31	7:30 PM	Peach Bowl	Georgia Dome; Atlanta, GA	No. 13 Miami (FL) 27, No. 20 Florida 10	
Jan 1	11:00 AM	Outback Bowl	Raymond James Stadium; Tampa, FL	No. 8 Georgia 24, No. 16 Wisconsin 21	
Jan 1	11:00 AM	Cotton Bowl	Cotton Bowl; Dallas, TX	No. 15 Tennessee 38, No. 22 Texas A&M 7	
Jan 1	12:30 PM	Gator Bowl	Alltel Stadium; Jacksonville, FL	No. 17 Florida State 30, West Virginia 18	
Jan 1	1:00 PM	Capital One Bowl	Florida Citrus Bowl; Orlando, FL	No. 11 Iowa 30, No. 12 LSU 25	
BCS Bowls
Jan 1	5:00 PM	Rose Bowl	Rose Bowl; Pasadena, CA	No. 6 Texas 38, No. 13 Michigan 37	
Jan 1	8:30 PM	Fiesta Bowl	Sun Devil Stadium; Tempe, AZ	No. 5 Utah 35, No. 19 Pittsburgh 7	
Jan 3	8:00 PM	Sugar Bowl	Louisiana Superdome; New Orleans, LA	No. 3 Auburn 16, No. 9 Virginia Tech 13	
Jan 4	8:00 PM	Orange Bowl (BCS National Championship Game)	Pro Player Stadium; Miami Gardens, FL	No. 1 USC 55, No. 2 Oklahoma 19	
Rankings from AP Poll released prior to the game. All times are in Eastern Time.

== Non-BCS bowls ==
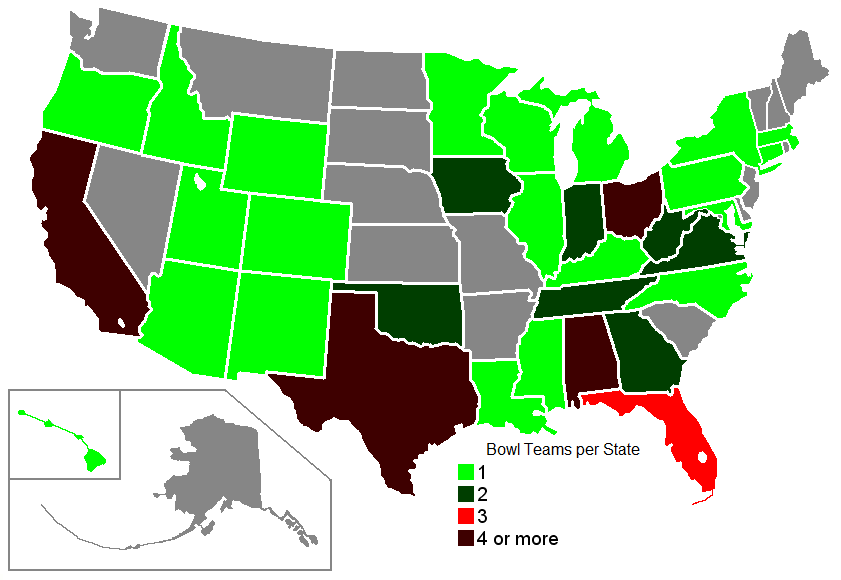
Number of bowl-going teams per state

Of the 59 Division I-A football teams with winning records, 56 were invited to the various bowl games. This season, bowl officials had more difficulty than usual filling their slots. Because the regular season was only 11 games, teams had to finish at least 6–5 to qualify. Teams that were allowed under NCAA rules to play a 12th regular-season game in return for playing at Hawaii had to finish at least 7–5.

Four conferences – the Big Ten, Big 12, Pac-10, and SEC – all failed to produce enough bowl-eligible teams to fill their contracted bowl slots. In addition, a massive brawl between Clemson and South Carolina players during their November 20 game, less than 24 hours following the Pacers–Pistons brawl during a National Basketball Association game, led both schools to announce that they would not go to any bowl game as a self-imposed punishment. Both schools were otherwise bowl-eligible, thus forcing bowl organizers to scramble even more to fill their slots. In addition, Utah's unexpected entry into the BCS caused further shuffling of normal bowl tie-ins.

The main beneficiary of this unexpected chaos was the Mid-American Conference, which received five bowl bids instead of its contracted two. The only bowl-eligible team willing to accept an invitation that was left out of this season's bowl games was another MAC school, Akron. The Zips would make their first bowl appearance the next season.

Three schools made their first-ever bowl appearance this season: UAB (Hawaii Bowl), UConn (2004 Motor City Bowl), and Troy State (Silicon Valley Football Classic). Of these three, only UConn won its game. For the first time since the 1968–1969 bowl season Nebraska did not go to a bowl game.

Records shown are pre-bowl.

=== New Orleans Bowl ===
- Southern Miss (6–5) 31, North Texas (7–4) 10

The bowl season kicked off on December 14 with the fourth annual New Orleans Bowl, one of two bowl games played at the Louisiana Superdome in New Orleans. Dustin Almond passed for 249 yards and a touchdown, and rushed for a touchdown as well, as Southern Miss Golden Eagles (Conference USA) defeated the North Texas Mean Green (Sun Belt Conference) 31–10.

=== Champs Sports Bowl ===
- Georgia Tech (6–5) 51, Syracuse (6–5) 14

The first of two bowl games at the Citrus Bowl in Orlando, Florida was the Champs Sports Bowl, held on December 21. It featured the Georgia Tech Yellow Jackets (ACC) and the Syracuse Orange (Big East). Georgia Tech quarterback Reggie Ball passed for two touchdowns and ran for another, while the Yellow Jackets defense recorded a touchdown off of an interception and a safety. Georgia Tech romped, 51–14.

=== GMAC Bowl ===
- Bowling Green (8–3) 52, Memphis (8–3) 35

The Bowling Green Falcons (MAC) met the Memphis Tigers (C-USA) on December 22 in Mobile, Alabama in the GMAC Bowl. In a meeting of high-powered offenses, Memphis's Danny Wimprime threw for 324 yards and 4 touchdowns, but was outdone by his counterpart Omar Jacobs, who had 365 yards and 5 touchdowns. Bowling Green won, 52–35.

=== Fort Worth Bowl ===
- Cincinnati (6–5) 32, Marshall (6–5) 14

The Fort Worth Bowl, held on December 23 at Amon G. Carter Stadium in the titular city, matched a departing C-USA team with a future member of that conference. The Cincinnati Bearcats, which left C-USA for the Big East Conference after the 2004–05 season, played the Marshall Thundering Herd, which joined C-USA from the MAC for 2005–06. Cincinnati quarterback Gino Guidugli returned from a broken hand to throw for two touchdowns, and the Bearcats defense held Marshall to 134 yards of total offense in a 32–14 win. The loss broke the Thundering Herd's streaks of 20 consecutive winning seasons and five winning bowl appearances (in nonconsecutive years).

=== Las Vegas Bowl ===
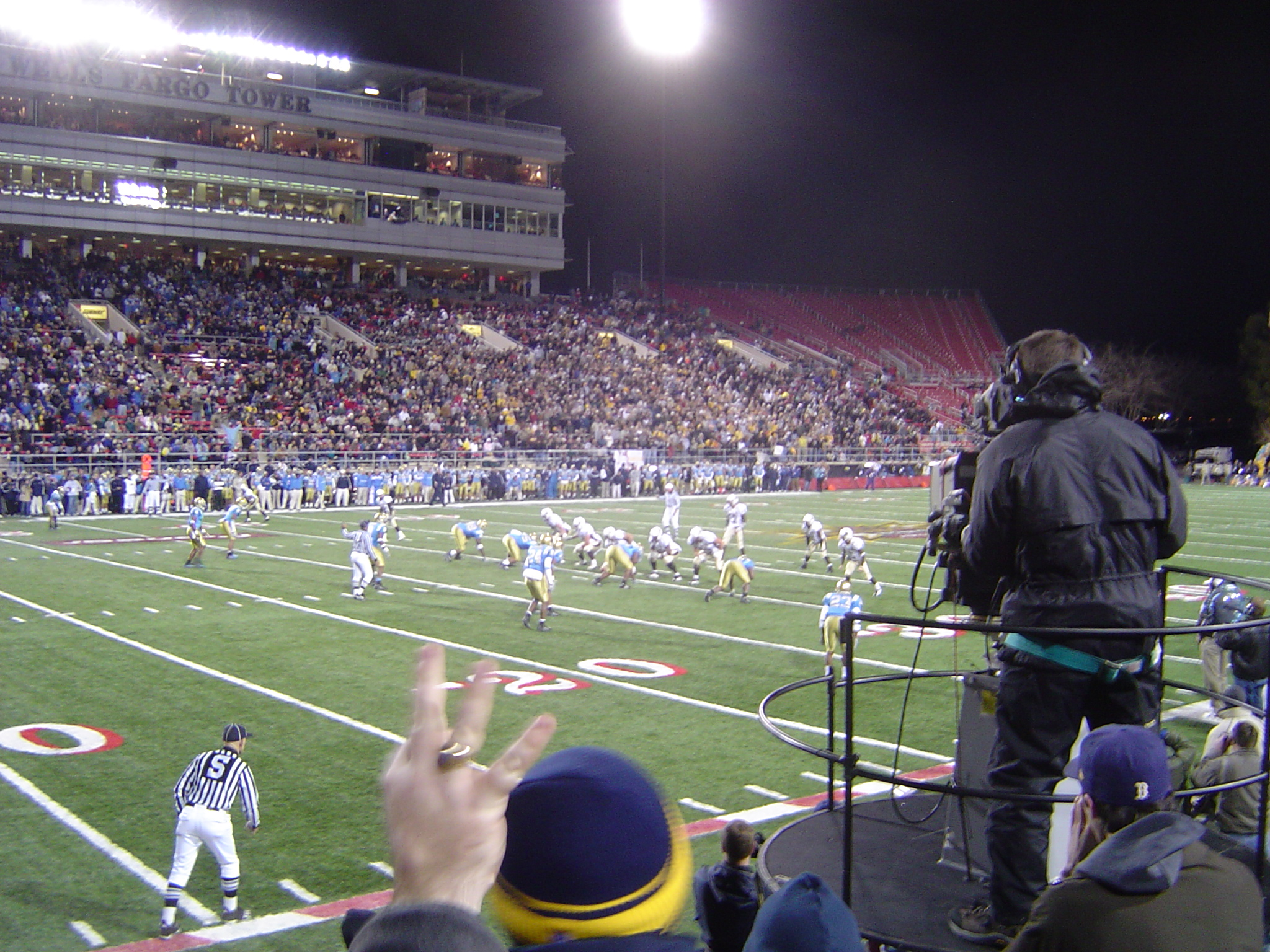
UCLA vs. Wyoming in the 2004 Las Vegas Bowl

- Wyoming (6–5) 24, UCLA (6–5) 21

The first matchup of the bowl season that pitted a team from a BCS AQ conference against a BCS non-AQ conference team was the Las Vegas Bowl, held at Sam Boyd Stadium in Whitney, Nevada on December 23. The UCLA Bruins (Pac-10) played the Wyoming Cowboys (Mountain West Conference), with UCLA the heavy favorite. The underdog Cowboys took an early 10–0 lead, but the Bruins stormed back to take a 21–10 lead going into the fourth quarter. The Cowboys scored a touchdown early in the fourth quarter on a trick play, and capped off the first major upset of the bowl season with a touchdown pass from Corey Bramlet to John Wadkowski with 57 seconds left. The 24–21 Wyoming win was the Cowboys' first bowl victory since 1968.

=== Hawaii Bowl ===
- Hawaii (7–5) 59, UAB (7–4) 40

On December 24, the Hawaii Warriors (WAC) played the Hawaii Bowl on their home field, Aloha Stadium in Honolulu for the third time in the bowl's three-year existence. The Warriors faced a first-time bowl participant in the UAB Blazers (C-USA). In an offensive shootout that saw both quarterbacks (Hawaii's Timmy Chang and UAB's Darrell Hackney) throw for over 400 yards, the homestanding Warriors won 59–40. The Warriors' Chad Owens caught two of Chang's four touchdown passes and returned a punt for a TD. Chang finished his career as the first Division I-A quarterback to throw for over 17,000 yards in his career, and also finished with career records for pass attempts, completions, and total offense.

=== MPC Computers Bowl ===
- Fresno State (8–3) 37, Virginia (8–3) 34

On December 27, the second matchup between BCS AQ and BCS non-AQ conference teams took place in the MPC Computers Bowl in Boise, Idaho. The Fresno State Bulldogs (WAC) played the Virginia Cavaliers (ACC). UVa went out to a 21–7 second-quarter lead, but the Bulldogs stormed back to tie the game at 24 early in the fourth quarter. The Cavaliers retook the lead early in the fourth quarter on a rushing touchdown by Wali Lundy, but Bulldogs quarterback Paul Pinegar threw a 3-yard TD pass to Jason Fairman with 19 seconds left; the ensuing extra point tied the game at 31, leading to the first overtime of the 2004–05 bowl season. In the overtime, the Cavaliers had the ball first and kicked a field goal. On the Bulldogs' first play in overtime, Pinegar threw his fifth TD pass of the day, connecting with Stephen Spach to give the Bulldogs a 37–34 upset win.

=== Motor City Bowl ===
- UConn (7–4) 39, Toledo (9–3) 10

The other bowl on December 27, the Motor City Bowl held at Ford Field in Detroit, was also a BCS AQ conference vs. BCS non-AQ conference matchup. The UConn Huskies made their first-ever bowl appearance in their second year in Division I-A and first as a member of the Big East. They faced the MAC champion Toledo Rockets, which were playing little more than an hour's drive from their campus. Rockets quarterback Bruce Gradowski, affected by a broken hand suffered in the MAC championship game, was ineffective before being benched at halftime. However, the Huskies were effective enough that a healthy Gradowski may not have made a difference; UConn quarterback Dan Orlovsky threw for two TDs with no interceptions, and return specialist Larry Taylor had 157 return yards, including a punt return for a TD. UConn won 39–10, giving BCS AQ conferences their first win in three tries against BCS non-AQ conference teams this season.

=== Independence Bowl ===
- Iowa State (8–4) 17, Miami (Ohio) (8–4) 13

On December 28 in Shreveport, Louisiana, another BCS AQ/non-AQ matchup took place in the Independence Bowl between the Iowa State Cyclones (Big 12) and the Miami (Ohio) RedHawks (MAC). Iowa State went out to a 10–0 lead in the second quarter, but Miami scored a touchdown late in that quarter to reduce the Cyclones' halftime lead to 10–7. The RedHawks scored a TD to take a 13–10 lead in the third quarter, but missed the extra point. The Cyclones' Ryan Kock scored the winning TD early in the fourth quarter, and the Cyclones defense held on for the 17–13 win. Two Cyclones, quarterback Bret Meyer and running back Stevie Hicks, rushed for over 100 yards each. RedHawks receiver Michael Larkin extended his NCAA record of consecutive games with a reception to 50. This was the last game for RedHawks head coach Terry Hoeppner, who took the head job at Indiana.

=== Insight Bowl ===
- Oregon State (6–5) 38, Notre Dame (6–5) 21

The second bowl on December 28, the Insight Bowl held at Bank One Ballpark in Phoenix, Arizona, the home of the Arizona Diamondbacks, was the second of the 2004–05 bowl season to pit two BCS AQ member teams. The Notre Dame Fighting Irish, the only independent with BCS automatic qualifying privileges, took on the Oregon State Beavers from the Pac-10. The Beavers never trailed in the game, and easily defeated the Irish 38–21. Beavers quarterback Derek Anderson threw for 359 yards and four touchdown passes, with no interceptions.

The game was a rematch of the 2001 Fiesta Bowl, played at the nearby Sun Devil Stadium, with a similar result (Oregon State blowout victory).

=== Houston Bowl ===
- Colorado (7–5) 33, UTEP (8–3) 28

On December 29, the Colorado Buffaloes (Big 12) took on the UTEP Miners (WAC) in the Houston Bowl at Reliant Stadium in the host city. The Miners led for most of the game, but Buffaloes quarterback Joel Klatt threw two TD passes in the fourth quarter to lead CU to a 33–28 win. Klatt finished 24-for-33 for 333 yards. Miners QB Jordan Palmer, younger brother of 2002 Heisman Trophy winner Carson Palmer, threw for 328 yards and two TDs, but only completed two of his last 12 passes, finishing 22-for-42 with two interceptions.

=== Alamo Bowl ===
- Ohio State (7–4) 33, Oklahoma State (7–4) 7

In the other game on December 29, the Alamo Bowl held at the Alamodome in San Antonio, the Ohio State Buckeyes (Big Ten) took on the Oklahoma State Cowboys (Big 12), in a game which matched two schools whose initials spell "OSU". This was also Ohio State's first December bowl since the 1993 Holiday Bowl. The Buckeyes defense set the tone for the game early, intercepting Cowboys quarterback Donovan Woods during the game's first possession. Justin Zwick, starting at quarterback in place of the suspended Troy Smith, threw a touchdown pass to Anthony Gonzalez three plays later, giving the Buckeyes a lead that they never relinquished. The Buckeyes won 33–7.

=== Continental Tire Bowl ===
- Boston College (8–3) 37, North Carolina (6–5) 24

In the first of four games on December 30, the Boston College Eagles, which left the Big East in July 2005 to join the ACC, played one of its future conference rivals, the North Carolina Tar Heels, in the Continental Tire Bowl at Bank of America Stadium in Charlotte, North Carolina. Eagles quarterback Paul Peterson earned MVP honors by going 24-for-33 for 236 yards and two TDs before breaking his leg in the fourth quarter. Andre Callender added 174 rushing yards for the Eagles. The game was close for the first three quarters, and tied three times, but the Eagles pulled away to win their fifth consecutive bowl game and final game as a Big East member 37–24.

=== Emerald Bowl ===
- Navy (9–2) 34, New Mexico (7–4) 19

The second game on December 30, the Emerald Bowl held at SBC Park in San Francisco, pitted the Navy Midshipmen (independent) against the New Mexico Lobos (MWC). After the Lobos jumped to an early 7–0 lead, Navy QB Aaron Polanco took over the game, rushing for three touchdowns and throwing for a fourth. The Midshipmen defense performed well in the clutch, forcing two turnovers in the first half that led to TDs and making a successful goal-line stand in the third quarter. After the stand, the Midshipmen offense then went on a 26-play drive that lasted nearly 15 minutes, ending with a field goal, that sealed Navy's 34–19 win. The Midshipmen finished the season 10–2, their first 10-win season since 1905. The Emerald Bowl is now known as the Fight Hunger Bowl.

=== Holiday Bowl ===
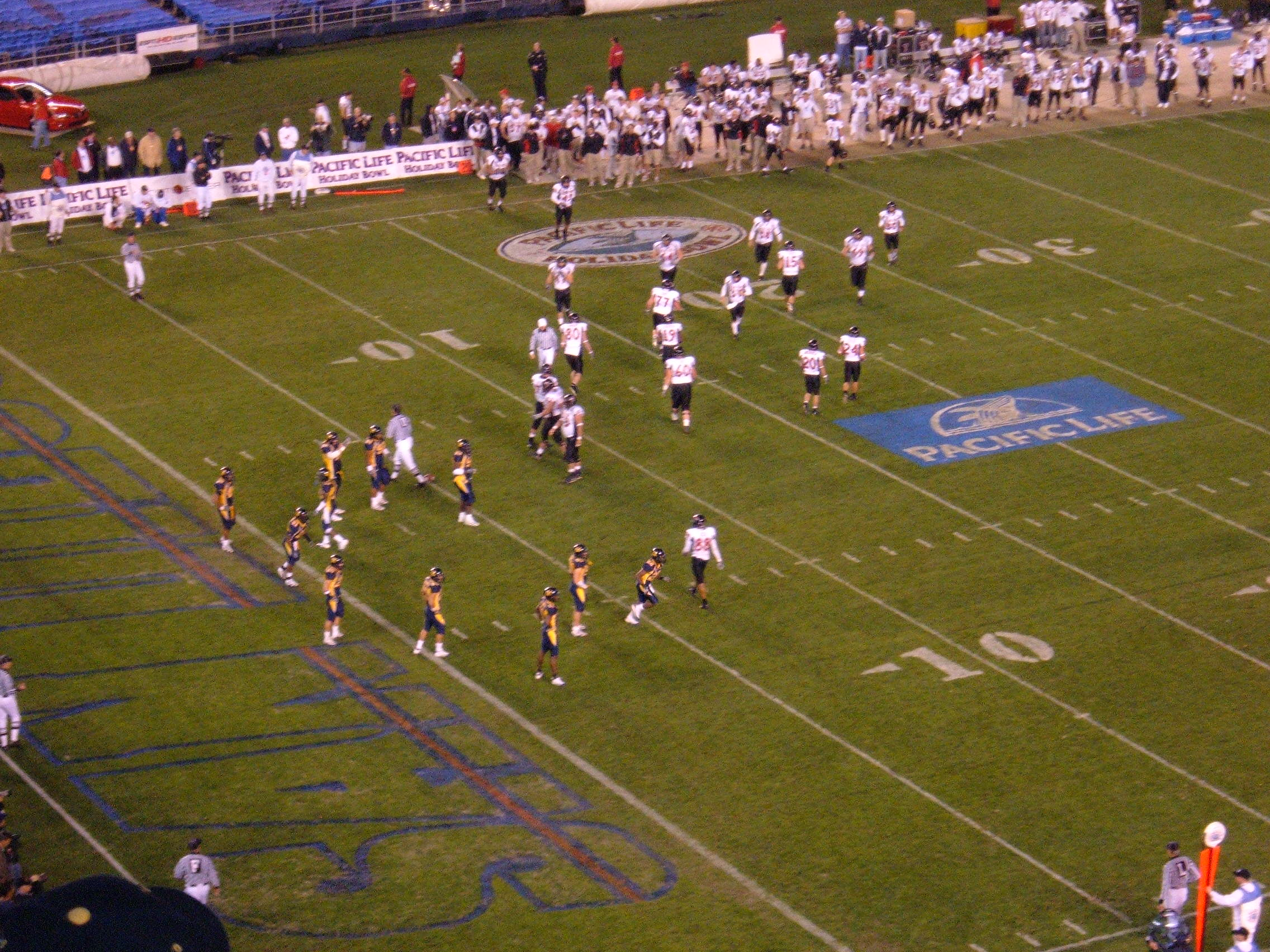
Texas Tech on offense at the 2004 Holiday Bowl

- Texas Tech (7–4) 45, California (10–1) 31

In the third game on December 30 (also the second of three in California), the Holiday Bowl was held at Qualcomm Stadium in San Diego, pitting the Pac-10's California Golden Bears and the Big 12's Texas Tech Red Raiders. Cal, edged out for a BCS bowl berth by Texas in the last week of the regular season, was out to prove that it deserved a BCS bowl berth. The Bears played well at first, finishing the first quarter with a 14–7 lead. However, the second and third quarters belonged to the Red Raiders, who outscored the Bears 31–3 in those periods, going on to score the biggest upset of the bowl season with a 45–31 win. Raiders QB Sonny Cumbie torched the Bears defense for 520 passing yards, going 40-for-60 with three TDs and no interceptions. The brightest spot for Cal was running back J.J. Arrington, who ran for 173 yards and a touchdown, making him only the third Pac-10 runner to reach 2,000 yards rushing in a season.

=== Silicon Valley Football Classic ===
- Northern Illinois (8–3) 34, Troy State (7–4) 21

The last game of December 30 was the Silicon Valley Football Classic at Spartan Stadium in San José. The Northern Illinois Huskies (MAC), playing in their first bowl game in 21 years, faced the Troy State Trojans from the Sun Belt, a school that joined NCAA Division I-A in 2001 and were playing in their first bowl game ever. The Trojans opened strong, scoring two touchdowns, a pass and a run by D.T. McDowell, in the first quarter to build a 14–0 lead. The Huskies came back, tying the score by the end of the first quarter with rushing touchdowns by Garrett Wolfe and Josh Haldi, then building a 34–14 lead in the fourth quarter. The Trojans attempted a comeback, with McDowell running in another touchdown, but failed on their next possession on fourth and goal, and the Huskies were able to run out the clock to complete a 34–21 win. This would be the last game ever for this bowl, as poor attendance due to a driving rainstorm, a rarity of December in the Bay Area, along with bad publicity as neither the Pac-10 or WAC had teams with the necessary winning records and other negative press led the NCAA to strip the Silicon Valley Football Classic of its certification on April 20, 2005.

=== Music City Bowl ===
- Minnesota (6–5) 20, Alabama (6–5) 16

The first game on December 31, the Music City Bowl held at The Coliseum in Nashville, matched the Alabama Crimson Tide (SEC) and Minnesota Golden Gophers (Big Ten). The first quarter was one of the sloppiest in recent years, with the two teams turning the ball over five times (Minnesota three times, Alabama twice). On the first play of the second quarter, the Gophers took a 14–7 lead on a touchdown run by Marion Barber III and never trailed again. Late in the fourth quarter, the Gophers, then leading 20–14, took a deliberate safety on a punt from their own end zone. On the ensuing possession, the Tide drove to the Gophers' 15-yard-line, but their threat ended with an incomplete pass on fourth down. The Gophers then ran out the clock for the 20–16 win. Barber ran for 187 yards, and fellow Gophers running back Laurence Maroney ran for 105. Alabama, which was second in the nation in total defense going into the game, had not given up a 100-yard game to an opposing rusher this season.

=== Sun Bowl ===
- Arizona State (8–3) 27, Purdue (7–4) 23

The next game on New Year's Eve, the Sun Bowl, held at the stadium of the same name in El Paso, Texas, pitted the Arizona State Sun Devils against the Purdue Boilermakers in what would be the sole Big Ten/Pac-10 matchup on the bowl schedule. The first half of the game was a defensive struggle, with the Sun Devils taking a 3–2 lead into the locker room. The offensive fireworks began on the first play from scrimmage of the second half, with Boilermakers QB Kyle Orton connecting with Brian Hare on an 80-yard TD pass. The Sun Devils answered with a Sam Keller TD pass to Derek Hagan to retake the lead. This set the stage for a wild fourth quarter that featured four lead changes, two of them in the last two minutes of the game. Purdue got the ball with 1:55 remaining and trailing 20–16; Orton took the Boilermakers down the field in four plays and 33 seconds, completing the drive with a 6-yard TD pass to Charles Davis. The Sun Devils then took only four plays to move the ball 80 yards, ending in a 19-yard Keller TD pass to Rudy Burgess with 43 seconds left. The ensuing extra point gave the Devils a 27–23 lead. Purdue was unable to move the ball in the remaining seconds, sealing the Devils' win.

=== Liberty Bowl ===
- Louisville (10–1) 44, Boise State (11–0) 40

The third game on December 31, and the last of the bowl season to feature two BCS non-AQ conference schools, was the Liberty Bowl, held in the Liberty Bowl Memorial Stadium in Memphis. One of the most intriguing matchups of the bowl season pitted the two top-ranked offenses in NCAA Division I-A. The Louisville Cardinals (C-USA) led the nation in scoring and total yardage per game; their opponents, WAC champion the Boise State Broncos, were second in both categories. The Broncos also took their undefeated regular season record and Division I-A's then-longest winning streak of 22 games into the contest. In a wild game that saw five lead changes, the Cardinals won 44–40, ending the Broncos' streak, despite a season-high four turnovers. The Cardinals racked up 564 yards of total offense, surpassing the 500-yard mark for the ninth time this season. Starting Louisville QB Stefan LeFors threw for two touchdowns, ran for a third, and made the key block allowing a fourth touchdown to score, but also had an interception run back for a TD. The Broncos went into the game averaging 511 yards per game on offense, but could only manage 281. This was the last game for Louisville in C-USA; in July 2005, they joined a BCS AQ conference as a new member of the Big East.

=== Peach Bowl ===
- Miami (Florida) (8–3) 27, Florida (7–4) 10

The final game on December 31 was the Peach Bowl, held at the Georgia Dome in Atlanta. It matched the Florida Gators of the SEC with one of their two bitter in-state rivals, the Miami Hurricanes from the ACC. The Hurricanes did most of their damage on special teams and defense, returning a blocked field goal and a punt for touchdowns, and intercepting Gators QB Chris Leak twice. Miami won 27–10, extending their winning streak against Florida to six games and giving 'Canes senior QB Brock Berlin (a former Florida player) a 5–0 record as a starter against Miami's two major in-state rivals (Florida and Florida State).

=== Cotton Bowl Classic ===
- Tennessee (9–3) 38, Texas A&M (7–4) 7

The Cotton Bowl Classic, held in the stadium of the same name in Dallas on January 1, matched the Tennessee Volunteers (SEC) and the Texas A&M Aggies (Big 12). On the game's seventh play from scrimmage, Vols QB Rick Clausen, a third-stringer for most of the season, completed a short pass to C.J. Fayton, who promptly turned the reception into a 57-yard touchdown to give the Vols an early lead. Clausen passed for two more TDs with no interceptions, Vols running back Gerald Riggs racked up 102 yards and a touchdown on the ground, and the Vols defense pressured the Aggies into five turnovers. Tennessee ended with a 38–7 win, their most one-sided bowl win ever.

=== Outback Bowl ===
- Georgia (9–2) 24, Wisconsin (9–2) 21

Also on New Year's Day, the Outback Bowl was held at Raymond James Stadium in Tampa, Florida. The game matched the Georgia Bulldogs and the Wisconsin Badgers in the first of two Big Ten-SEC New Year's Day contests. The first 20 minutes of the game were mostly a defensive battle, with the Badgers taking a 6–3 lead. Georgia QB David Greene threw a TD pass in the second quarter to give the Bulldogs a lead they never relinquished. He added a second TD pass in the third quarter, but had an interception run back for a Badgers TD in the fourth. Thomas Brown added 111 rushing yards and a TD for the Bulldogs, and Lombardi Award winner David Pollack forced a key Badgers fumble with one of his three sacks. The Bulldogs held on for a 24–21 win, extending Greene's NCAA record for wins by a starting quarterback to 42.

=== Gator Bowl ===
- Florida State (8–3) 30, West Virginia (8–3) 18

The third bowl game on January 1 was the Gator Bowl, held at Alltel Stadium in Jacksonville, Florida. It matched the Florida State Seminoles (ACC) and the West Virginia Mountaineers (Big East). Longtime Seminoles coach Bobby Bowden was facing his former school for the first time since the two met in this game in 1982. The 'Noles went out to an early lead when Leon Washington ran 69 yards for a TD; he finished with 195 yards rushing on only 12 carries. However, inconsistent Seminoles QB Chris Rix helped keep the Mountaineers in the game, throwing two interceptions and fumbling three times, losing one, in the first half. Rix eventually settled down, leading the Seminoles on two touchdown drives in the second half. Lorenzo Booker added 101 yards rushing for the Seminoles. The Mountaineers ran for 238 yards against the nation's top rushing defense, led by 134 yards and two TDs by Kay-Jay Harris. However, special teams miscues hurt the Mountaineers. In the first half alone, a return man fumbled away a kickoff, two different kickers missed extra points, a kickoff was booted out of bounds, and the Mountaineers faked a field goal but failed to convert the first-down run. Even more tellingly, the Mountaineers were unsuccessful in the red zone; they advanced the ball past the Seminoles 20 five times, but could only score a TD and a field goal. The Seminoles pulled away to a 30–18 win, saving them from a third straight bowl loss and giving Bowden his 18th bowl victory, one shy of Joe Paterno's record of 19.

=== Capital One Bowl ===
- Iowa (9–2) 30, LSU (9–2) 25

The fourth bowl game on January 1, the second of the bowl season held at the Citrus Bowl in Orlando, and the other Big Ten vs. SEC contest on New Year's Day was the Capital One Bowl, featuring the Iowa Hawkeyes and the LSU Tigers. The Hawkeyes scored on their first possession, with QB Drew Tate burning an LSU blitz by completing a pass to Clinton Solomon that turned into a 57-yard touchdown play. This gave Iowa a lead that it did not give up until the game's last minute. The Hawkeyes defense largely bottled up the Tigers' running game, except for a 74-yard TD run by Alley Broussard in the second quarter, and Iowa had a 24–12 lead early in the fourth. Freshman QB JaMarcus Russell came off the bench for LSU and connected with Skyler Green for two fourth-quarter TD passes, the last of which gave LSU a 25–24 lead with 46 seconds left. After a failed 2-point conversion, Iowa got the ball back, and Tate completed two passes, but a penalty pushed the Hawkeyes back to their own 44 with 14 seconds left. Tate threw long to Warren Holloway, who was open because of an LSU coverage breakdown, and Holloway scored the winning touchdown with no time remaining. No extra point was attempted, and Iowa won 30–25. The result spoiled Nick Saban's last game as LSU head coach; he left to become head coach of the Miami Dolphins. With the loss, Saban's record fell to 30–1 when leading at the half with LSU, who also became the first defending BCS national champion to lose a non-BCS bowl the following year.

== Bowl Championship Series games ==
Records shown are pre-bowl.

=== Rose Bowl ===
- Texas (10–1) 38, Michigan (9–2) 37

The Rose Bowl, held on January 1 in the stadium of the same name in Pasadena, California, pitted the Big Ten champions, the Michigan Wolverines, and the Texas Longhorns from the Big 12. Utah's unexpected entry into the BCS games, combined with Texas leapfrogging Cal in the final BCS rankings, plus the fact that Pac-10 champion Southern California was playing in the Orange Bowl for the National Championship made it impossible for the Rose Bowl to maintain its traditional Big Ten–Pac-10 match-up for only the third time since 1947.

Nonetheless, the match-up promised to be highly entertaining, as well as historic for being the first ever game between Michigan and Texas, the winningest and third-winningest college football programs, respectively, of all time. The 2,271 games played by the two teams mark the most games ever played by two teams before they met for the first time. It was also the Longhorns' first trip ever to the Rose Bowl, and the game itself proved to be a record-setting performance as well—16 Rose Bowl individual or team records were set or tied during the game, as well as numerous team and conference records.

The game proved to be an offensive showcase. Longhorns QB Vince Young had 372 yards of total offense, rushing for 192 yards and four TDs and passing for 180 yards and a fifth TD, setting new Rose Bowl record for most total touchdowns. He became the first Texas quarterback to throw for over 1,000 yards and rush for over 1,000 yards in a single season. Together with Doak Walker Award-winning running back Cedric Benson, the two became the first Texas duo to each run for 1,000 yards in the same season.

Wolverines freshman QB Chad Henne threw for four TDs, tying both the Michigan and Rose Bowl single-game record. Three of Henne's TDs went to All-American receiver and Fred Biletnikoff Award winner Braylon Edwards. Edwards set a Rose Bowl record for touchdown passes caught in a game, and also set Michigan and Big Ten records for career touchdown receptions (39). Another Wolverines receiver, Steve Breaston, amassed 310 all-purpose yards, breaking a Rose Bowl record set by O. J. Simpson in 1969.

By midway through the third quarter, the teams had been tied at 7, 14, and 21, but the Wolverines took a 31–21 lead going into the fourth quarter. In that quarter, Young ran for TDs before and after a Michigan field goal, giving the Longhorns a 35–34 lead. The Wolverines retook the lead with 3:04 remaining on Garrett Rivas' third field goal of the day. On the ensuing possession, Young led the 'Horns into position for a 37-yard field goal with 2 seconds left. Michigan took both of its remaining timeouts in an attempt to "ice" Texas kicker Dusty Mangum. He finally put a wobbly kick through the uprights as time expired, giving the Longhorns a 38–37 win. The thrilling come-from-behind fourth quarter victory marked their sixth such victory of the year. The game was won on the final play for the first time in Rose Bowl history, and only the third time in Longhorns history.

=== Fiesta Bowl ===
- Utah (11–0) 35, Pittsburgh (8–3) 7

The final game on January 1 was the Fiesta Bowl, held at Sun Devil Stadium in Tempe, Arizona (suburban Phoenix). It matched the Pittsburgh Panthers, the Big East champions and the Mountain West champion Utah Utes. This was another historic matchup, as Utah became the first BCS non-AQ conference member to appear in a BCS bowl game. It was also the swan song for Utes head coach Urban Meyer, who left after the game to take the head coaching job at Florida.

The matchup was fairly controversial, though not because of the Utes' presence; in their 11–0 regular season, they had defeated three schools from BCS AQ conferences, two of which participated in bowl games, by an average of 22 points. No opponent came within two touchdowns of the Utes. The controversy surrounded the presence of Pittsburgh, or more to the point, the Big East, in the BCS AQ pool. The Panthers finished 8–3 in a conference that had just lost its two strongest programs (Miami-Florida and Virginia Tech) to the ACC—a tiebreaker among four teams granted Pittsburgh the Big East championship. However, the BCS was still contractually obligated to place the Big East champion in one of its bowls.

Utah's vaunted offense started the game slowly, but the Utes nonetheless went into halftime leading 14–0. The tone for the game was initially set by the Utes defense, which mercilessly pressured Panthers QB Tyler Palko, and special teams, which blocked a Pittsburgh field goal attempt and nearly blocked a punt. In the third quarter, the Utah offense came alive, with QB Alex Smith, a Heisman Trophy finalist who became the top overall pick in the 2005 NFL draft, throwing two TD passes and connecting on a hook and lateral that ended in a Paris Warren TD. By the end of that quarter, the Utes led by their final margin of 35–7. The win capped off a fairy-tale 12–0 season, Utah's first perfect season since 1930, and sent Meyer off to his new job in Gainesville with a historic win.

Smith went 29-for-37 passing for 328 yards and three TDs with no interceptions, and also led the Utes in rushing with 68 yards. Warren caught 15 passes for 180 yards and a TD, as well as scoring on the pass-and-lateral play. The Utes defense sacked Palko nine times.

=== Sugar Bowl ===
- Auburn (12–0) 16, Virginia Tech (10–1) 13

In the second game of the bowl season held at the Superdome in New Orleans, the SEC champion Auburn Tigers took on the Virginia Tech Hokies, the ACC champions in the Sugar Bowl on January 3.

Despite finishing the regular season 12–0 and winning the SEC, Auburn was not able to crack the top two in the BCS rankings, shutting the Tigers out of the BCS title game. Their main hope for a split national championship (as happened the season before with LSU and Southern California) was to score a resounding win over the Hokies and hope that Oklahoma unimpressively defeated Southern California in the Orange Bowl the following evening. Auburn would then have to hope that enough voters in the AP media poll switch their votes from Oklahoma to give the Tigers the AP title.

The Tigers had a chance to blow the game open in the first half, but were unable to score a touchdown in three trips inside the Hokies' 10-yard line, settling for three field goals from John Vaughn. Auburn's defense was more than up to the challenge from the Hokies, shutting them out in the first half. Tech did not help itself, as Jesse Allen dropped an easy touchdown reception on fourth-and-goal at the Auburn 1 in the second quarter.

Auburn finally drove for a TD on the first possession of the second half, and kept their 16–0 lead into the fourth quarter. However, two second-half turnovers kept the Hokies in the game, and their offense finally awakened in the fourth quarter. Tech QB Bryan Randall threw two TD passes to Josh Howard, the last an 80-yard bomb, in the fourth quarter, cutting the Auburn lead to 16–13. The Hokies then attempted an onside kick, but the Tigers recovered and chose to run out the clock to instead of trying to score again. This preserved the Tigers' perfect 13–0 season; however, it effectively ended Auburn's faint hopes for a split national championship.

Tigers QB Jason Campbell was the game's MVP, completing 11 of his 16 pass attempts for 189 yards and a touchdown. However, he was intercepted once. For the Hokies, Randall went 21-for-38 passing for 299 yards and two TDs, but was intercepted twice.

=== Orange Bowl ===
- Southern Cal (12–0) 55, Oklahoma (12–0) 19

In the final major bowl game of the BCS, the Orange Bowl, played on January 4, 2005, the top two 12–0 teams met for the likely National Championship (see Sugar Bowl, above). The top-ranked Southern California Trojans, the Pac-10 Champions, were able to obtain the National Championship title with a huge 55–19 victory over the second-ranked and Big 12 champion Oklahoma Sooners.

An Orange Bowl record five touchdown passes were thrown by Heisman Trophy winner Matt Leinart, and 38 points were scored by the Trojans in the first 20 minutes of the first half alone to effectively seal the victory.

The game was billed as the Game of the Century by many. It was the first time that two teams went wire-to-wire ranked #1 and #2. It featured the winner (Leinart) and the runner-up (Oklahoma's Adrian Peterson) in that year's Heisman Trophy voting. USC came into the game as a slight underdog after opening as a 3-point favorite. Most of the "experts" predicted an Oklahoma win, calling the Trojans thin at all positions except for all-purpose threat Reggie Bush. The Sooners looked to prove the experts correct by driving the field on their first possession for a 7–0 lead. The Trojans tied the score 7–7 on a spectacular diving catch by tight end Dominique Byrd. It looked like it would be a classic back-and-forth battle until a key turnover turned the tide to USC for good. USC had just punted to Oklahoma and got a good roll inside Oklahoma's 10-yard line. Inexplicably, Senior Mark Bradley tried to pick up the ball and promptly fumbled it away. LenDale White scored on the next play and USC never looked back. From that point on, Matt Leinart was on fire as was his primary target, Sophomore WR Steve Smith. Smith caught 3 TD passes on the night, also an Orange Bowl record. Oklahoma continued turning the ball over as the Trojan defense proved too tough all night. Freshman RB sensation Adrian Peterson was held to well under 100 yards, despite having been the first freshman to finish second in the Heisman balloting.

Many fans left after the third quarter at which point the score was 48–10, USC. After the Trojans took a 55–10 lead, Oklahoma got a safety on USC QB Matt Leinart. The Sooners followed it up with a short drive for the final points.

=== USC Sanctions ===
On June 10, 2010, the NCAA placed the University of Southern California (USC) on a probation period of four years, with two years without any bowl game appearances, and forfeiture of all games in which Reggie Bush (an ineligible player because of accepting payments from an agent) participated in beginning in December 2004, and therefore, includes the Orange Bowl BCS National Championship game. On June 6, 2011, the NCAA officially vacated USC's Orange Bowl BCS National Championship game win.

== All-Star Games ==
=== Gridiron Classic ===
In the Gridiron Classic, the first of the four post-BCS bowl games played January 15, 2005, at The Villages retirement center in Lady Lake, Florida, Marcus Randall (quarterback for LSU) ran seven out of eleven passes for 88 yards as he led the South squad to a win over the North by the score of 24–21. Randall was also declared the game's Most Valuable Player.

=== East–West Shrine Game ===
The 80th East–West Shrine Game, played January 15, 2005, (just after the Gridiron Classic) at SBC Park in San Francisco, saw two Louisville teammates, Stefan LeFors and J. R. Russell, propel the East squad to a 45–27 win over the West team. The two teams combined for 1,013 yards of offense in the highest-scoring Shrine Game since 1979.

LeFors was named the MVP for the offense, while Alex Green of Duke won the MVP for the defense.

=== Las Vegas All-American Classic ===
The 4th edition of the Las Vegas All-American Classic was played January 22, 2005, in Las Vegas, Nevada. The West won the game by a score of 21–16 over the East.

=== Hula Bowl ===
A total 92 of the best seniors in college football were represented in the January 22, 2005, version of the Hula Bowl game played in Wailuku, Hawaii. Michigan State's Ronald Stanley scored with two defensive touchdowns to help win the game for the East over the West by the score of 20–13. For his efforts, Stanley won Most Valuable Player. This was the first time since 1996 that the Hula Bowl used the East and West squads format.

=== Senior Bowl ===
In the Senior Bowl, the final game of the 2004–05 college football season, Kansas State's Darren Sproles, Akron's Charlie Frye, and Ohio State's Mike Nugent led the North to a 23–13 victory over the South in the annual bowl game played January 29, 2005, in Mobile, Alabama. Frye won the Most Valuable Player honors for his completion of 10 to 12 passes and making possible a 22-yard touchdown at the game's conclusion to seal the victory for the North. Nugent scored three field goals from 25, 36, and 41 yards, respectively, while Sproles earned the North's defensive player of the game for five carries gaining 55 yards. Leroy Hill of Clemson earned the defensive player honors for the South team.

== Conference standings ==
In the following table of teams that played in bowl games, winners are marked in bold and losers are marked in italics. The table is sorted by winning percentage, then by number of competing teams, and finally alphabetically by conference name.

Conf	#	W	L	Pct	Teams
Mountain West	3	2	1	0.667	New Mexico, **Utah**, **Wyoming**
C-USA	5	3	2	0.600	**Cincinnati**, **Louisville**, Memphis, **Southern Miss**, UAB
Pac-10	5	3	2	0.600	**Arizona State**, California, **Oregon State**, UCLA, **USC**
ACC	6	3	3	0.500	**Florida State**, **Georgia Tech**, **Miami (FL)**, North Carolina, Virginia, Virginia Tech
Big Ten	6	3	3	0.500	**Iowa**, Michigan, **Minnesota**, **Ohio State**, Purdue, Wisconsin
SEC	6	3	3	0.500	Alabama, **Auburn**, Florida, **Georgia**, LSU, **Tennessee**
WAC	4	2	2	0.500	Boise State, **Fresno State**, **Hawaii**, UTEP
Independent	2	1	1	0.500	**Navy**, Notre Dame
Big 12	7	4	3	0.571	**Colorado**, **Iowa State**, Oklahoma, Oklahoma State, **Texas**, Texas A&M, **Texas Tech**
Big East	5	2	3	0.400	**Boston College**, **UConn**, Pittsburgh, Syracuse, West Virginia
MAC	5	2	3	0.400	**Bowling Green**, Marshall, Miami (OH), **Northern Illinois**, Toledo
Sun Belt	2	0	2	0.000	North Texas, Troy State
