= 2004 Baylor Bears football team =

American college football season

2004 Baylor Bears football
- Conference: Big 12 Conference
- South Division
- Record: 3–8 (1–7 Big 12)
- Head coach: Guy Morriss (2nd season)
- Offensive coordinator: Brent Pease (2nd season)
- Offensive scheme: Pro set
- Defensive coordinator: Bill Bradley (1st season)
- Base defense: 4–2
- Home stadium: Floyd Casey Stadium

2004 Big 12 Conference football standings
	Conf.			Overall
Team	W		L	W		L
North Division
Colorado xy	4	–	4	8	–	5
Iowa State x	4	–	4	7	–	5
Nebraska	3	–	5	5	–	6
Missouri	3	–	5	5	–	6
Kansas	2	–	6	4	–	7
Kansas State	2	–	6	4	–	7
South Division
No. 3 Oklahoma xy$	8	–	0	12	–	1
No. 5 Texas %	7	–	1	11	–	1
Texas A&M	5	–	3	7	–	5
No. 18 Texas Tech	5	–	3	8	–	4
Oklahoma State	4	–	4	7	–	5
Baylor	1	–	7	3	–	8
Championship: Oklahoma 42, Colorado 3
$ – BCS representative as conference champion; % – BCS at-large representative; x – Division champion/co-champions; y – Championship game participant; Rankings from AP Poll

The 2004 Baylor Bears football team (variously "Baylor", "BU", or the "Bears") represented Baylor University in the 2004 NCAA Division I-A football season. The team competed in the Big 12 Conference South Division, playing their home games at Floyd Casey Stadium in Waco, Texas. They were coached by head coach Guy Morriss.

== Schedule ==
Date	Time	Opponent	Site	TV	Result	Attendance	Source
September 4	6:00 p.m.	at UAB*	Legion Field; Birmingham, Alabama		L 14–56	21,080	
September 11	6:00 p.m.	Texas State*	Floyd Casey Stadium; Waco, Texas		W 24–17	28,533	
September 25	6:00 p.m.	North Texas*	Floyd Casey Stadium; Waco, Texas		W 37–14	33,619	
October 2	11:30 a.m.	at No. 5 Texas	Darrell K Royal–Texas Memorial Stadium; Austin, Texas (rivalry)	PPV	L 14–44	82,626	
October 9	9:00 p.m.	Missouri	Floyd Casey Stadium; Waco, Texas	FSN	L 10–30	22,652	
October 16	1:00 p.m.	at Nebraska	Memorial Stadium; Lincoln, Nebraska		L 27–59	77,881	
October 23	2:00 p.m.	Iowa State^{†}	Floyd Casey Stadium; Waco, Texas		L 25–26	25,249	
October 30	6:00 p.m.	No. 16 Texas A&M	Floyd Casey Stadium; Waco, Texas (Battle of the Brazos)		W 35–34 ^{OT}	41,283	
November 6	1:00 p.m.	at Texas Tech	Jones SBC Stadium; Lubbock, Texas (rivalry)		L 17–42	53,121	
November 13	1:00 p.m.	at No. 25 Oklahoma State	Boone Pickens Stadium; Stillwater, Oklahoma		L 21–49	43,261	
November 20	11:00 a.m.	No. 2 Oklahoma	Floyd Casey Stadium; Waco, Texas	FSN	L 0–35	32,182	
*Non-conference game; ^{†}Homecoming; Rankings from AP Poll released prior to the game; All times are in Central time
