= 2004 Kansas State Wildcats football team =

American college football season

2004 Kansas State Wildcats football
- Conference: Big 12 Conference
- North
- Record: 4–7 (2–6 Big 12)
- Head coach: Bill Snyder (16th season)
- Co-offensive coordinators: Del Miller (8th season); Greg Peterson (2nd season)
- Offensive scheme: Spread
- Defensive coordinator: Bob Elliott (3rd season)
- Base defense: 4–3
- Home stadium: KSU Stadium

2004 Big 12 Conference football standings
	Conf.			Overall
Team	W		L	W		L
North Division
Colorado xy	4	–	4	8	–	5
Iowa State x	4	–	4	7	–	5
Nebraska	3	–	5	5	–	6
Missouri	3	–	5	5	–	6
Kansas	2	–	6	4	–	7
Kansas State	2	–	6	4	–	7
South Division
No. 3 Oklahoma xy$	8	–	0	12	–	1
No. 5 Texas %	7	–	1	11	–	1
Texas A&M	5	–	3	7	–	5
No. 18 Texas Tech	5	–	3	8	–	4
Oklahoma State	4	–	4	7	–	5
Baylor	1	–	7	3	–	8
Championship: Oklahoma 42, Colorado 3
$ – BCS representative as conference champion; % – BCS at-large representative; x – Division champion/co-champions; y – Championship game participant; Rankings from AP Poll

The 2004 Kansas State Wildcats football team represented Kansas State University in the 2004 NCAA Division I-A football season. The team's head football coach was Bill Snyder. The Wildcats played their home games in KSU Stadium. The team finished the season with a record of 4–7 and a Big 12 Conference record of 2–6.

== Schedule ==
Date	Time	Opponent	Rank	Site	TV	Result	Attendance	Source
September 4	6:10 p.m.	No. 13 (I-AA) Western Kentucky*	No. 13	KSU Stadium; Manhattan, KS		W 27–13	46,740	
September 11	11:10 a.m.	Fresno State*	No. 13	KSU Stadium; Manhattan, KS	FSN	L 21–45	46,468	
September 18	1:10 p.m.	Louisiana–Lafayette*		KSU Stadium; Manhattan, KS		W 40–20	46,514	
October 2	6:00 p.m.	at Texas A&M		Kyle Field; College Station, TX	TBS	L 30–42	72,675	
October 9	6:00 p.m.	at Kansas		Memorial Stadium; Lawrence, KS (rivalry)		L 28–31	50,152	
October 16	11:00 a.m.	No. 2 Oklahoma		KSU Stadium; Manhattan, KS	ABC	L 21–31	52,310	
October 23	1:10 p.m.	Nebraska		KSU Stadium; Manhattan, KS (rivalry)		W 45–21	52,234	
October 30	1:10 p.m.	Texas Tech^{†}		KSU Stadium; Manhattan, KS	FSN	L 25–35	48,338	
November 6	11:40 a.m.	at Missouri		Faurot Field; Columbia, MO	FSN	W 35–24	63,412	
November 13	12:30 p.m.	at Colorado		Folsom Field; Boulder, CO (rivalry)		L 31–38	43,502	
November 20	11:10 a.m.	Iowa State		KSU Stadium; Manhattan, KS (rivalry)	FSN	L 23–37	44,829	
*Non-conference game; ^{†}Homecoming; Rankings from AP Poll released prior to the game; All times are in Central time

== Game summaries ==
=== Texas A&M ===
	1	2	3	4	Total
K-State	7	7	3	13	30
Texas A&M	7	14	7	14	42

=== #2 Oklahoma ===
#2 Oklahoma at Kansas State

Team	1	2	3	4	Total
• #2 Oklahoma	7	10	7	7	31
K-State	7	7	7	0	21

- Date: October 16
- Location: KSU Stadium, Manhattan, Kansas
- Game start: 11:11 a.m. CST
- Elapsed time: 3:29
- Game attendance: 52,310
- Referee: John Laurie
- TV announcers (ABC): Gary Thorne (Play-by-play), Ed Cunningham (Color), & Jim Gray (Sideline)

=== Nebraska ===
Nebraska at Kansas State

Team	1	2	3	4	Total
Nebraska	7	7	7	0	21
• K-State	14	10	14	7	45

- Date: October 23
- Location: KSU Stadium, Manhattan, Kansas
- Game start: 1:10 p.m. CDT
- Game attendance: 52,234

== Roster ==
2004 Kansas State Wildcats football team roster
Players
Coaches
Offense

Pos.	#	Name	Class
OT	79	Jon Doty	Sr
RB	36	Ayo Saba	Jr
RB	43	Darren Sproles	Sr

Defense

Pos.	#	Name	Class
DE	83	Blake Seiler	Jr
LB	45	Ted Sims	Jr
DB	26	Tyler Woolfolk	Sr

Special teams

Pos.	#	Name	Class
K	15	Joe Rheem	Sr
K/P	19	Jeff Snodgrass	Jr

Head coach

- Bill Snyder

Coordinators/assistant coaches

- Del Miller – Co-Offensive Coordinator & quarterbacks
- Greg Peterson – Co-Offensive Coordinator & wide receivers
- Michael Smith – Running backs
- Matt Miller – Tight ends
- Bob Stanley – Offensive line
- Bob Elliott – Defensive Coordinator & secondary
- Mo Latimore – interior Defensive line
- Joe Bob Clements – Defensive ends
- Chris Cosh – Linebackers

Legend

- (C) Team captain
- (S) Suspended
- (I) Ineligible
- Injured
- Redshirt

== Statistics ==
=== Scores by quarter ===
	1	2	3	4	Total
Kansas State	58	78	71	119	326
Opponents	73	81	83	100	337

=== Team ===
	KSU	Opp
Scoring	326	337
Points per game	29.6	30.6
First downs	225	180
Rushing	120	75
Passing	88	94
Penalty	11	11
Total offense	4,001	3,846
Avg per play	5.0	5.6
Avg per game	363.7	349.6
Fumbles-Lost	25-15	20-9
Penalties-Yards	69-498	89-689
Avg per game	45.3	62.6

	KSU	Opp
Punts-Yards	54–2,192	57–2,336
Avg per punt	40.6	41.0
Time of possession/Game	33:20	26:08
3rd down conversions	63/160	57/147
4th down conversions	11/19	4/8
Touchdowns scored	41	45
Field goals-Attempts	13-15	8-13
PAT-Attempts	37-38	43-44
Attendance	338,833	229,741
Games/Avg per Game	7/48,405	4/57,435

=== Offense ===
==== Rushing ====
Name	GP	Att	Gain	Loss	Net	Avg	TD	Long	Avg/G
Darren Sproles	11	244	1,380	62	1,318	5.4	11	74	119.8
Thomas Clayton	10	15	71	0	71	4.7	0	15	7.1
Yamon Figurs	11	2	11	3	8	4.0	0	11	0.7
Total	11	480	2,321	277	2,044	4.3	25	74	185.8
Opponents	11	394	1,887	256	1,631	4.1	23	80	148.3

==== Passing ====
Name	GP-GS	Effic	Att-Cmp-Int	Yds	TD	Lng	Avg/G	Pct.
Dylan Meier	10	121.51	220-127-5	1,436	9	86	143.6	57.7
Allen Webb	10	100.71	94-49-4	521	3	48	52.1	52.1
Total	11	115.28	314-176-9	1,957	12	c 86	177.9	56.1
Opponents	11	133.37	287-154-10	2,215	19	64	174.6	53.7

==== Receiving ====
Name	GP	No.	Yds	Avg	TD	Long	Avg/G
Jermaine Moreira	11	39	406	10.4	4	29	36.9
Darren Sproles	11	32	223	7.0	0	28	20.3
Yamon Figurs	11	31	483	15.6	2	51	43.9
Total	11	176	1,957	11.1	12	86	177.9
Opponents	11	154	2,215	14.4	19	64	201.4

== 2005 NFL draft ==
Player	Position	Round	Pick	NFL club
Darren Sproles	Running back	4	130	San Diego Chargers
