= 2004 Big 12 Championship Game =

Colorado Buffaloes	Oklahoma Sooners
(7–4)	(11–0)
3	42
Head coach: Gary Barnett	Head coach: Bob Stoops
	AP / Coaches / BCS; 2 / 2 / 2
	1	2	3	4	Total
Colorado	0	0	3	0	3
Oklahoma	14	14	7	7	42
- Date: December 4, 2004
- Season: 2004
- Stadium: Arrowhead Stadium
- Location: Kansas City, Missouri
- Referee: Jon Bible
- Attendance: 62,310

United States TV coverage
- Network: ABC
- Announcers: Brad Nessler, Bob Griese and Lynn Swann

2004 Big 12 Conference football standings
	Conf.			Overall
Team	W		L	W		L
North Division
Colorado xy	4	–	4	8	–	5
Iowa State x	4	–	4	7	–	5
Nebraska	3	–	5	5	–	6
Missouri	3	–	5	5	–	6
Kansas	2	–	6	4	–	7
Kansas State	2	–	6	4	–	7
South Division
No. 3 Oklahoma xy$	8	–	0	12	–	1
No. 5 Texas %	7	–	1	11	–	1
Texas A&M	5	–	3	7	–	5
No. 18 Texas Tech	5	–	3	8	–	4
Oklahoma State	4	–	4	7	–	5
Baylor	1	–	7	3	–	8
Championship: Oklahoma 42, Colorado 3
$ – BCS representative as conference champion; % – BCS at-large representative; x – Division champion/co-champions; y – Championship game participant; Rankings from AP Poll

The 2004 Dr Pepper Big 12 Football Championship Game was played on December 4, 2004 in Arrowhead Stadium in Kansas City, Missouri. The game determined the 2004 football champions of the Big 12 Conference. The #2 Oklahoma Sooners defeated the Colorado Buffaloes 42-3.

== The teams ==
The Oklahoma Sooners came into the game with a perfect 11–0 record and #2 in the nation. They started the season with four home games, defeating Bowling Green, Houston, Oregon, and Texas Tech. The Sooners then traveled to Dallas for the Red River Shootout against #5 Texas, which they won 12-0. Oklahoma then beat Kansas State on the road; then returned home for their homecoming game against Kansas. Their next two games were both road games against ranked conference opponents; they beat #20 Oklahoma State and #22 Texas A&M. They finished the season with wins at home against Nebraska and at Baylor.

The Colorado Buffaloes came into the game with a 7–4 record; they were co-champions of the North Division (with Iowa State) and got into the championship game via head-to-head result. The Buffaloes started the season with three wins: Colorado State (in the Rocky Mountain Showdown), at Washington State and back home against North Texas. They lost the next two games against Missouri and #21 Oklahoma State. They beat Iowa State by 5, which would ultimately be their ticket into the Big 12 Championship Game. They dropped their next two matchups, losing to #17 Texas A&M and #8 Texas. They finished the regular season with three wins, however: at Kansas, at home against Kansas State, and at Nebraska.

== Game summary ==
Oklahoma's success was fueled by quarterback Jason White, who exceeded 250 yards passing. The Sooners' offense ran over Colorado's defense, finishing the game with 498 total yards (to Colorado's 46) and 26 first downs (to Colorado's 3). They controlled the ball for just over 24 minutes, as opposed to the Buffaloes' 12 minutes of possession.

The Sooners' defense showed up as well; Colorado finished the game 0-12 on third down conversions and 0-1 on fourth down conversions.

=== Scoring summary ===
Scoring summary

Quarter	Time	Drive			Team	Scoring information	Score	
Quarter	Time	Plays	Yards	TOP	Team	Scoring information	COLO	OKLA
1	10:52	11	80	4:08	OKLA	Will Peoples 5-yard touchdown reception from Jason White, Garrett Hartley kick good	0	7
1	5:58	6	63	2:00	OKLA	Mark Clayton 22-yard touchdown reception from Jason White, Garrett Hartley kick good	0	14
2	15:00	8	54	4:15	OKLA	Mark Clayton 22-yard touchdown reception from Jason White, Garrett Hartley kick good	0	21
2	6:21	8	40	3:57	OKLA	Adrian Peterson 1-yard touchdown run, Garrett Hartley kick good	0	28
3	10:11	12	28	4:49	OKLA	Adrian Peterson 3-yard touchdown run, Garrett Hartley kick good	0	35
3	2:05	5	15	2:27	COLO	34-yard field goal by Mason Crosby	3	35
4	13:32	7	66	3:17	OKLA	Adrian Peterson 32-yard touchdown run, Garrett Hartley kick good	3	42
"TOP" = time of possession. For other American football terms, see Glossary of American football.							3	42

=== Statistics ===
Statistics	COLO	OKLA
First downs	3	26
3rd Down Efficiency	0-12	10-16
Rushes-yards	16-(-4)	46-236
Passing yards	64	262
Passing: Comp–Att–Int	9-28-1	24-32-2
Time of possession	12:34	24:06
