= 2004 Nebraska Cornhuskers football team =

American college football season

2004 Nebraska Cornhuskers football
- Conference: Big 12 Conference
- North Division
- Record: 5–6 (3–5 Big 12)
- Head coach: Bill Callahan (1st season)
- Offensive coordinator: Jay Norvell (1st season)
- Offensive scheme: West Coast
- Defensive coordinator: Kevin Cosgrove (1st season)
- Base defense: 4–3
- Home stadium: Memorial Stadium

2004 Big 12 Conference football standings
	Conf.			Overall
Team	W		L	W		L
North Division
Colorado xy	4	–	4	8	–	5
Iowa State x	4	–	4	7	–	5
Nebraska	3	–	5	5	–	6
Missouri	3	–	5	5	–	6
Kansas	2	–	6	4	–	7
Kansas State	2	–	6	4	–	7
South Division
No. 3 Oklahoma xy$	8	–	0	12	–	1
No. 5 Texas %	7	–	1	11	–	1
Texas A&M	5	–	3	7	–	5
No. 18 Texas Tech	5	–	3	8	–	4
Oklahoma State	4	–	4	7	–	5
Baylor	1	–	7	3	–	8
Championship: Oklahoma 42, Colorado 3
$ – BCS representative as conference champion; % – BCS at-large representative; x – Division champion/co-champions; y – Championship game participant; Rankings from AP Poll

The 2004 Nebraska Cornhuskers football team represented the University of Nebraska–Lincoln in the 2004 NCAA Division I-A football season. The team was coached by Bill Callahan and played their home games in Memorial Stadium in Lincoln, Nebraska. This was Nebraska's first losing season since 1961.

== Schedule ==
Date	Time	Opponent	Site	TV	Result	Attendance	Source
September 4	6:00 pm	No. 12 (I-AA) Western Illinois*	Memorial Stadium; Lincoln, NE	PPV	W 56–17	77,471	
September 11	11:00 am	Southern Miss*	Memorial Stadium; Lincoln, NE	ABC	L 17–21	77,887	
September 18	11:00 am	at Pittsburgh*	Heinz Field; Pittsburgh, PA	ABC	W 24–17	40,133	
October 2	6:10 pm	Kansas	Memorial Stadium; Lincoln, NE (rivalry)	PPV	W 14–8	77,637	
October 9	6:10 pm	at Texas Tech	Jones SBC Stadium; Lubbock, TX	TBS	L 10–70	52,954	
October 16	1:05 pm	Baylor	Memorial Stadium; Lincoln, NE		W 59–27	77,881	
October 23	1:10 pm	at Kansas State	KSU Stadium; Manhattan, KS (rivalry)		L 21–45	52,234	
October 30	11:00 am	Missouri^{†}	Memorial Stadium; Lincoln, NE (rivalry)	FSN	W 24–3	77,616	
November 6	1:00 pm	at Iowa State	Jack Trice Stadium; Ames, IA (rivalry)		L 27–34	45,022	
November 13	6:00 pm	at No. 2 Oklahoma	Gaylord Family Oklahoma Memorial Stadium; Norman, OK (rivalry)	FSN	L 3–30	84,916	
November 26	11:00 am	Colorado	Memorial Stadium; Lincoln, NE (rivalry)	ABC	L 20–26	77,661	
*Non-conference game; ^{†}Homecoming; Rankings from AP Poll released prior to the game; All times are in Central time

== Roster and coaching staff ==
2004 Nebraska Cornhuskers football team roster
Players
Coaches
Offense

Pos.	#	Name	Class
QB	7	Jordan Adams	So
WR	27	Willie Amos	Sr
G	71	Jake Andersen	Sr
OL	65	Greg Austin	So
WR	38	Brandon Biodrowski	Sr
WR	19	Andy Birkel	So
OL	59	Brett Byford	RFr
OL	62	Andy Christensen	Fr
QB	12	Joe Dailey (C)	So
QB	15	Beau Davis	Fr
OT	67	Darren DeLone	Sr
WR	26	Dan Erickson	RFr
OL	78	Mike Erickson	Sr
OT	77	Seppo Evwaraye	Jr
WR	28	Isaiah Fluellen	So
OL	79	Cornealius Fuamatu-Thomas	Jr
QB	13	Joe Ganz	Fr
QB	17	Garth Glissman	Jr
QB	6	Ryan Goodman	Fr
IB	30	Tierre Green	RFr
OL	73	Jared Helming	Jr
TE	11	Matt Herian	Jr
TE	42	Sean Hill	RFr
IB	9	David Horne	Jr
OL	61	Mike Huff	Fr
RB	32	Brandon Jackson	Fr
WR	31	Joel Jackson	Sr
TE	47	Dusty Keiser	Sr
WR	89	Tyler Kenney	So
G	75	Brandon Koch	Jr
FB	45	Steve Kriewald	Sr
IB	36	Thomas Lawson	Fr
WR	10	Mark LeFlore	Jr
OL	74	Newton Lingenfelter	So
OL		Chris Loos
OL	64	Kurt Mann	So
WR	5	Shamus McKoy	Jr
WR	18	Mike McLaughlin	Jr
FB	33	Grant Miller	So
QB	8	Zach Miller	RFr
TE	81	Josh Mueller	RFr
WR	84	Grant Mulkey	So
OL	76	Lydon Murtha	Fr
WR	83	Terrence Nunn	Fr
WR	24	Jack O'Holleran	Sr
WR	80	Santino Panico	Fr
OL	54	Chris Patrick	RFr
WR	21	Todd Peterson	Fr
TE	85	J.B. Phillips	RFr
OL	56	Gary Pike	Jr
WR	2	Ross Pilkington (C)	Jr
IB	25	Kade Pittman	RFr
OL	69	Nick Povendo	Sr
IB	4	Cory Ross	Jr
IB	37	Mike Sampogna	Fr
TE	48	Andy Sand	RFr
WR	14	Matt Schroeder	Jr
TE	83	Chris Septak	Sr
TE	88	Clayton Sievers	Fr
QB	16	Mike Stuntz	Jr
WR	87	Nate Swift	Fr
OL	57	Cory Timm	So
FB	41	Dane Todd	So
WR	20	Kiffin Wigert	Sr
WR	3	Ben Zajicek	Sr

Defense

Pos.	#	Name	Class
DT	96	Titus Adams	Jr
CB	16	Cole Biodrowski	Jr
DE	48	Adam Blankenship	Fr
SLB	34	Stewart Bradley	So
LB	40	Lance Brandenburgh	Fr
CB	21	Titus Brothers	RFr
DT	65	Chris Bryant	So
SS	14	Daniel Bullocks	Jr
FS	20	Josh Bullocks (C)	Jr
FS	36	Dan Burrow	Sr
DE	90	Adam Carriker	So
LB	11	Ira Cooper	Sr
CB	6	Donald DeFrand	Jr
SS	46	Ben Eisenhart	RFr
FS	15	Tyler Fisher	Jr
SS	18	Travis Gingery	RFr
DT	99	Brandon Greeson	So
DB	26	Cortney Grixby	Fr
CB	29	Kellen Huston	Sr
LB	49	Adam Ickes	Jr
DT	95	Nathan Krug	Jr
CB	35	Chris LeFlore	RFr
LB	52	Tyler Lueck	Fr
DE	89	Kevin Luhrs	RFr
DT	50	Jeff McBride	Sr
LB	13	Corey McKeon	RFr
CB	1	Lornell McPherson	Sr
DE	44	Jay Moore	So
DE	55	Wali Muhammad	Jr
DT	58	Danny Muy	Fr
DE	56	Trevor Neemann	RFr
DT	63	Matt O'Shea	Jr
DE	86	Andy Poulosky	RFr
LB	53	Mitch Reeves	So
DE	85	Thomas Rice	RFr
SS	24	Brandon Rigoni	So
CB	30	Joey Robison	Jr
LB	51	Bo Ruud	RFr
LB	38	Barrett Ruud (C)	Sr
FS	8	Andrew Shanle	So
SS	23	Shane Siegel	Jr
LB	54	Chad Sievers	Sr
DT	66	Le Kevin Smith	Jr
DE	43	Ty Steinkuhler	Fr
DT	74	Brandon Teamer	So
DE	5	Benard Thomas	Sr
SS	25	Blake Tiedtke	Jr
CB	3	Fabian Washington	Jr
LB	91	Tyler Wortman	Fr

Special teams

Pos.	#	Name	Class
PK	22	Sandro DeAngelis	Sr
PK	27	David Dyches	So
P	90	Tyler Kester	RFr
P	37	Sam Koch	Jr
PK	91	Eric Lueshen	RFr
PK	92	Jared Nielsen	RFr
LS	94	Jake Peetz	RFr
P	97	Dan Titchener	Fr
PK	98	Jake Wesch	Fr

Head coach

- Bill Callahan
  1st season
  1st year at Nebraska
  Alma mater: Benedictine

Coordinators/assistant coaches

- Jay Norvell
  1st season as OC/QB coach
  1st year at Nebraska
  Alma mater: Iowa
- Kevin Cosgrove
  1st season as DC/LB coach
  1st year at Nebraska
  Alma mater: UW-Oshkosh
- John Blake
  1st season as DL coach
  1st year at Nebraska
  Alma mater: Oklahoma
- Bill Busch
  1st season as OLB coach
  5th year at Nebraska
  Alma mater: Nebraska Wesleyan
- Scott Downing
  2nd season as TE/ST coach
  5th year at Nebraska
  Alma mater: Sterling
- Phil Elmassian
  1st season as Sec coach
  1st year at Nebraska
  Alma mater: William & Mary
- Turner Gill
  1st season as WR coach
  13th year at Nebraska
  Alma mater: Nebraska
- Randy Jordan
  1st season as RB coach
  1st year at Nebraska
  Alma mater: North Carolina
- Dennis Wagner
  1st season as OL coach
  1st year at Nebraska
  Alma mater: Utah
- Michael Christianson
  1st season as Special Assistant coach
  1st year at Nebraska
  Alma mater: Western Oregon
- Dave Kennedy
  1st season as S&C coach
  8th year at Nebraska
  Alma mater: Nebraska
- Aaron Stamn
  1st season as GA coach
  1st year at Nebraska
  Alma mater: Minnesota Mankato
- Dan McLaughlin
  1st season as GA coach
  1st year at Nebraska
  Alma mater: Bellevue College

Legend

- (C) Team captain
- (S) Suspended
- (I) Ineligible
- Injured
- Redshirt

Roster
Last update: January 16, 2011

=== Depth chart ===
Defense

FS
Josh Bullocks
Andrew Shanle
⋅

WILL	MIKE	SAM
Chad Sievers	Barrett Ruud	Stewart Bradley
Mark Brungardt	Ira Cooper	Bo Ruud
⋅	⋅	⋅

SS
Daniel Bullocks
Shane Siegel
⋅

CB
Fabian Washington
Cortney Grixby
⋅

DE	DT	DT	DE
Benard Thomas	Le Kevin Smith	Titus Adams	Adam Carriker
Jay Moore	Jeff McBride	Brandon Teamer	Wali Muhammad
⋅	⋅	⋅	⋅

CB
Lornell McPherson
Kellen Huston
⋅

Offense

WR
Ross Pilkington
Willie Amos
Z
Grant Mulkey
Matt Schroeder

LT	LG	C	RG	RT
Mike Erickson	Brandon Koch	Kurt Mann	Jake Andersen	Seppo Evwarye
Darren DeLone	Greg Austin	Gary Pike	Jared Helming	Nick Povendo
⋅	⋅	⋅	⋅	⋅

TE
Matt Herian
Dusty Keiser
J.B Phillips

WR
Terrence Nunn
Mark LeFlore
⋅

QB
Joe Dailey
Ryan Goodman
⋅

RB
Cory Ross
Tierre Green
Brandon Jackson

FB
Steve Kriewald
Dana Todd
⋅

Special teams
PK Sandro Deangelis
P Sam Koch
KR Tierre Green
Brandon Jacson
PR Santino Panico
LS \

== Game summaries ==
=== Western Illinois ===
Western Illinois at Nebraska [box score]

Team	1	2	3	4	Total
Western Illinois	0	3	14	0	17
• Nebraska	14	28	7	7	56

- Date: September 4
- Location: Memorial Stadium, Lincoln, Nebraska
- Game start: 6:00 p.m. CST
- Game attendance: 77,471
- TV announcers (PPV): Dave Armstrong (Play-by-Play), J. C. Pearson (Color), & Steve Taylor (Sideline)

=== Southern Miss ===
Southern Miss at Nebraska [box score]

Team	1	2	3	4	Total
• Southern Miss	6	3	6	6	21
Nebraska	0	3	14	0	17

- Date: September 11
- Location: Memorial Stadium, Lincoln, Nebraska
- Game start: 11:10 a.m. CST
- Game attendance: 77,887
- TV announcers (ABC): Gary Gerould (Play-by-Play), Ray Bentley (Color), & Vince Welch (Sideline)

=== at Pittsburgh ===
Nebraska at Pittsburgh [box score]

Team	1	2	3	4	Total
• Nebraska	10	14	0	0	24
Pittsburgh	7	3	0	7	17

- Date: September 18
- Location: Heinz Field, Pittsburgh
- Game start: 11:00 a.m. CST
- Game attendance: 40,133
- TV announcers (ABC): Brent Musburger (Play-by-Play), Gary Danielson (Color), & Jack Arute (Sideline)

=== Kansas ===
Kansas at Nebraska [box score]

Team	1	2	3	4	Total
Kansas	2	3	3	0	8
• Nebraska	0	7	7	0	14

- Date: October 2
- Location: Memorial Stadium, Lincoln, Nebraska
- Game start: 6:10 p.m. CST
- Game attendance: 77,637
- TV announcers (PPV): Dave Armstrong (Play-by-Play), J. C. Pearson (Color), & John Kelly (Sideline)

=== at Texas Tech ===
Nebraska Cornhuskers at Texas Tech Red Raiders – Game summary

Quarter	1	2	3	4	Total
Cornhuskers	0	3	7	0	10
Red Raiders	7	14	21	28	70

at Jones SBC Stadium, Lubbock, Texas

- Date: October 9
- Game time: 7:00 p.m.
- Game weather: Temperature: 55 °F (13 °C) • Weather: Partly cloudy • Wind: N 6 MPH
- Game attendance: 52,594
- Referee: John Laurie
- TV announcers (TBS): Ron Thulin, Charles Davis, and Craig Sager
- Box score, Recap

Game information

First quarter

- TTU – Jarrett Hicks 22-yard pass from Sonny Cumbie (Alex Trlica kick), 6:23. Red Raiders 7–0. Drive: 11 plays, 74 yards, 4:11.

Second quarter

- TTU – Taurean Henderson 3-yard run (Alex Trlica kick), 10:35. Red Raiders 14–0. Drive: 7 plays, 86 yards, 2:23.
- NEB – David Dyches 46-yard field goal, 4:53. Red Raiders 14–3. Drive: 4 plays, -2 yards, 0:53.
- TTU – Jarrett Hicks 80-yard pass from Sonny Cumbie (Alex Trlica kick), 1:14. Red Raiders 21–3. Drive: 2 plays, 85 yards, 0:50.

Third quarter

- NEB – Mark LeFlore 74-yard pass from Joe Dailey (David Dyches kick), 14:07. Red Raiders 21–10. Drive: 3 plays, 80 yards, 0:53.
- TTU – Johnnie Mack 6-yard pass from Sonny Cumbie (Alex Trlica kick), 4:16. Red Raiders 28–10. Drive: 10 plays, 69 yards, 5:36.
- TTU – Bristol Olomua 3-yard pass from Sonny Cumbie (Alex Trlica kick), 2:24. Red Raiders 35–10. Drive: 4 plays, 41 yards, 1:23.
- TTU – Johnnie Mack 14-yard run (Alex Trlica kick), 2:03. Red Raiders 42–10. Drive: 1 play, 14 yards, 0:07.

Fourth quarter

- TTU – Taurean Henderson 1-yard run (Alex Trlica kick), 11:16. Red Raiders 49–10. Drive: 14 plays, 64 yards, 5:37.
- TTU – Nehemiah Glover 2-yard pass from Sonny Cumbie (Alex Trlica kick), 9:36. Red Raiders 56–10. Drive: 3 plays, 8 yards, 1:27.
- TTU – Johnie Mack 6-yard run (Alex Trlica kick), 9:05. Red Raiders 63–10. Drive: 2 plays, 6 yards, 0:13.
- TTU – Taurean Henderson 6-yard pass from Cody Hodges (Alex Trlica kick), 7:14. Red Raiders 70–10. Drive: 1 play, 12 yards, 0:20.

Top passers

- NEB – Joe Dailey – 14/34, 187 yards, TD, INT
- TTU – Sonny Cumbie – 44/56, 436 yards, 5 TD, INT

Top rushers

- NEB – Cory Ross – 15 rushes, 49 yards
- TTU – Taurean Henderson – 7 rushes, 38 yards, 2 TD

Top receivers

- NEB – Mark LeFlore – 5 receptions, 110 yards, TD
- TTU – Jarrett Hicks – 3 receptions, 107 yards, 2 TD

Texas Tech forced eight turnovers while only committing one and had 523 yards of total offense while Nebraska only had 292. The 70 points given up and the 60 point margin of defeat are both the largest in Nebraska school history. In 2020, the Omaha World-Herald ranked this game as the seventh most painful loss in the Cornhuskers' history since a 36–62 loss to Colorado in 2001.

=== Baylor ===
Baylor at Nebraska [box score]

Team	1	2	3	4	Total
Baylor	3	0	21	3	27
• Nebraska	7	24	7	21	59

- Date: October 16
- Location: Memorial Stadium, Lincoln, Nebraska
- Game start: 1:05 p.m. CST
- Game attendance: 77,881

=== at Kansas State ===
Nebraska at Kansas State [box score]

Team	1	2	3	4	Total
Nebraska	7	7	7	0	21
• Kansas State	14	10	14	7	45

- Date: October 23
- Location: KSU Stadium, Manhattan, Kansas
- Game start: 1:10 p.m. CST
- Game attendance: 52,234

=== Missouri ===
Missouri at Nebraska [box score]

Team	1	2	3	4	Total
Missouri	0	3	0	0	3
• Nebraska	3	7	7	7	24

- Date: October 30
- Location: Memorial Stadium, Lincoln, Nebraska
- Game start: 11:00 a.m. CST
- Game attendance: 77,616
- TV announcers (FSN): Joel Meyers (Play-by-Play), Dave Lapham (Color), & Jim Knox (Sideline)
- Source: ESPN

Scoring summary
1	11:14	NEB	Sandro DeAngelis 41 yard field goal	NEB 3–0
2	14:46	MIZZ	Joe Tantarelli 39 yard field goal	Tied 3–3
2	9:42	NEB	Adam Ickes 16 yard blocked punt return (Sandro DeAngelis kick)	NEB 10–3
3	1:34	NEB	Cory Ross 15 yard run (Sandro DeAngelis kick)	NEB 17–3
4	2:56	NEB	Cory Ross 86 yard run (Sandro DeAngelis kick)	NEB 24–3

=== at Iowa State ===
Nebraska at Iowa State [box score]

Team	1	2	3	4	Total
Nebraska	0	7	13	7	27
• Iowa State	10	14	10	0	34

- Date: November 6
- Location: Jack Trice Stadium, Ames, Iowa
- Game start: 1:00 p.m. CST
- Game attendance: 45,022

=== at Oklahoma ===
Nebraska at Oklahoma [box score]

Team	1	2	3	4	Total
Nebraska	0	0	0	3	3
• Oklahoma	3	20	7	0	30

- Date: November 13
- Location: Gaylord Family Oklahoma Memorial Stadium, Norman, Oklahoma
- Game start: 6:10 p.m. CST
- Game attendance: 84,916
- TV announcers (FSN): Kevin Eschenfelder (Play-by-Play), Gary Reasons (Color), & John Rhadigan (Sideline)

=== Colorado ===
Colorado at Nebraska [box score]

Team	1	2	3	4	Total
• Colorado	10	10	6	0	26
Nebraska	0	7	0	13	20

- Date: November 26
- Location: Memorial Stadium, Lincoln, Nebraska
- Game start: 11:10 a.m. CST
- Game attendance: 77,661
- TV announcers (ABC): Terry Gannon (Play-by-Play), Terry Bowden, Tim Brant (Colors), & Suzy Shuster (Sideline)

== Rankings ==
Ranking movements Legend: — = Not ranked
	Week															
Poll	Pre	1	2	3	4	5	6	7	8	9	10	11	12	13	14	Final
AP	—	—	—	—	—	—	—	—	—	—	—	—	—	—	—	—
Coaches	—	—	—	—	—	—	—	—	—	—	—	—	—	—	—	—
Harris	Not released				—	—	—	—	—	—	—	—	—	—	—	Not released
BCS	Not released							—	—	—	—	—	—	—	—	Not released

== After the season ==
Nebraska finished tied for 3rd place in the Big 12 North Division and tied for 7th conference-wide, with a final record of 5–6 (3–5), its first losing season since 1961. Head Coach Bill Callahan's overall career record was established at 5–6 (.455) and 3–5 (.375) in conference. Nebraska did not play in a bowl game for the first time since 1968, ending their consecutive bowl streak at 35.

=== Awards ===
Award	Name(s)
All-America 3rd team	Barrett Ruud
All-Big 12 1st team	Barrett Ruud
All-Big 12 2nd team	Josh Bullocks
All-Big 12 honorable mention	Daniel Bullocks, Mike Erickson, Matt Herian, Kurt Mann, Cory Ross, Le Kevin Smith, Fabian Washington

=== NFL and pro players ===
The following Nebraska players who participated in the 2004 season later moved on to the next level and joined a professional or semi-pro team as draftees or free agents.

Name	Team
Titus Adams	New York Jets
Stewart Bradley	Philadelphia Eagles
Daniel Bullocks	Detroit Lions
Josh Bullocks	New Orleans Saints
Adam Carriker	St. Louis Rams
Sandro DeAngelis	Calgary Stampeders
Mike Erickson	Berlin Thunder
Seppo Evwaraye	Carolina Panthers
Joe Ganz	Washington Redskins
Cortney Grixby	Carolina Panthers
Brandon Jackson	Green Bay Packers
Sam Koch	Baltimore Ravens
Jay Moore	San Francisco 49ers
Lydon Murtha	Detroit Lions
Terrence Nunn	New England Patriots
Chris Patrick	New York Giants
Todd Peterson	Jacksonville Jaguars
Andy Poulosky	Sioux City Bandits
Cory Ross	Baltimore Ravens
Barrett Ruud	Tampa Bay Buccaneers
Bo Ruud	New England Patriots
Andrew Shanle	Chicago Bears
Le Kevin Smith	New England Patriots
Ty Steinkuhler	New York Jets
Nate Swift	Denver Broncos
Fabian Washington	Oakland Raiders
