= 2004 Oklahoma Sooners football team =

American college football season

2004 Oklahoma Sooners football

Big 12 champion Big 12 South Division champion

Big 12 Championship Game, W 42–3 vs. Colorado

Orange Bowl (BCS NCG), L 19–55 vs. USC
- Conference: Big 12 Conference
- South

Ranking
- Coaches: No. 3
- AP: No. 3
- Record: 12–1 (8–0 Big 12)
- Head coach: Bob Stoops (6th season)
- Co-offensive coordinators: Chuck Long (3rd season); Kevin Wilson (3rd season)
- Offensive scheme: Spread
- Co-defensive coordinators: Brent Venables (6th season); Bo Pelini (1st season)
- Base defense: 4–3
- Captains: Vince Carter; Mark Clayton; Dan Cody; Lance Mitchell; Jason White
- Home stadium: Gaylord Family Oklahoma Memorial Stadium

2004 Big 12 Conference football standings
	Conf.			Overall
Team	W		L	W		L
North Division
Colorado xy	4	–	4	8	–	5
Iowa State x	4	–	4	7	–	5
Nebraska	3	–	5	5	–	6
Missouri	3	–	5	5	–	6
Kansas	2	–	6	4	–	7
Kansas State	2	–	6	4	–	7
South Division
No. 3 Oklahoma xy$	8	–	0	12	–	1
No. 5 Texas %	7	–	1	11	–	1
Texas A&M	5	–	3	7	–	5
No. 18 Texas Tech	5	–	3	8	–	4
Oklahoma State	4	–	4	7	–	5
Baylor	1	–	7	3	–	8
Championship: Oklahoma 42, Colorado 3
$ – BCS representative as conference champion; % – BCS at-large representative; x – Division champion/co-champions; y – Championship game participant; Rankings from AP Poll

The 2004 Oklahoma Sooners football team represented the University of Oklahoma during the 2004 NCAA Division I-A football season, the 110th season of Sooner football. The team was led by two-time Walter Camp Coach of the Year Award winner, Bob Stoops, in his sixth season as head coach. They played their home games at Gaylord Family Oklahoma Memorial Stadium in Norman, Oklahoma. They were a charter member of the Big 12 Conference.

Conference play began with a win over the Texas Tech Red Raiders in Norman on October 2, and ended with a win over the Colorado Buffaloes in the Big 12 Championship Game on December 4. The Sooners finished the regular season 12–0 (9–0 in Big 12) while winning their third Big 12 title and their 39th conference title overall. They were invited to the 2005 Orange Bowl, which served as the BCS National Championship Game that year.

Following the season, Jammal Brown was selected 13th overall and Mark Clayton 22nd in the 2005 NFL draft, along with Brodney Pool, Mark Bradley and Dan Cody in the 2nd round, Brandon Jones in the 3rd, Antonio Perkins in the 4th, Donte Nicholson, Mike Hawkins and Lance Mitchell in the 5th, and Wes Sims in the 6th. This total number of 11 stands as the most Sooners taken in the NFL draft in the 16 years of the Stoops era.

== Schedule ==
Date	Time	Opponent	Rank	Site	TV	Result	Attendance
September 4	11:00 a.m.	Bowling Green*	No. 2	Gaylord Family Oklahoma Memorial Stadium; Norman, OK	ABC	W 40–24	84,319>
September 11	6:00 p.m.	Houston*	No. 2	Gaylord Family Oklahoma Memorial Stadium; Norman, OK	TBS	W 63–13	84,280
September 18	2:30 p.m.	Oregon*	No. 2	Gaylord Family Oklahoma Memorial Stadium; Norman, OK	ABC	W 31–7	84,574
October 2	11:30 a.m.	Texas Tech	No. 2	Gaylord Family Oklahoma Memorial Stadium; Norman, OK	FSN	W 28–13	84,580
October 9	11:00 a.m.	vs. No. 5 Texas	No. 2	Cotton Bowl; Dallas, TX (Red River Shootout)	ABC	W 12–0	79,587
October 16	11:00 a.m.	at Kansas State	No. 2	KSU Stadium; Manhattan, KS	ABC	W 31–21	52,310
October 23	11:30 a.m.	Kansas^{†}	No. 2	Gaylord Family Oklahoma Memorial Stadium; Norman, OK	FSN	W 41–10	84,520
October 30	11:00 a.m.	at No. 20 Oklahoma State	No. 2	Boone Pickens Stadium; Stillwater, OK (Bedlam Series, College GameDay)	ABC	W 38–35	48,837
November 6	2:30 p.m.	at No. 22 Texas A&M	No. 2	Kyle Field; College Station, TX	ABC	W 42–35	81,125
November 13	6:00 p.m.	Nebraska	No. 2	Gaylord Family Oklahoma Memorial Stadium; Norman, OK (rivalry)	FSN	W 30–3	84,916
November 20	11:00 a.m.	at Baylor	No. 2	Floyd Casey Stadium; Waco, TX	FSN	W 35–0	32,182
December 4	7:00 p.m.	vs. Colorado	No. 2	Arrowhead Stadium; Kansas City, MO (Big 12 Championship Game)	ABC	W 42–3	62,130
January 4, 2005	7:00 p.m.	vs. No. 1 USC*	No. 2	Pro Player Stadium; Miami Gardens, FL (Orange Bowl—BCS National Championship Game, College GameDay)	ABC	L 19–55	77,912
*Non-conference game; ^{†}Homecoming; Rankings from AP Poll released prior to the game; All times are in Central time

== Rankings ==
Ranking movements Legend: ██ Increase in ranking ██ Decrease in ranking
	Week															
Poll	Pre	1	2	3	4	5	6	7	8	9	10	11	12	13	14	Final
AP	2	2	2	2	2	2	2	2	2	2	2	2	2	2	2	3
Coaches Poll	2	2	2	2	2	2	2	2	2	2	2	2	2	2	2	3
BCS	Not released							3	2	2	2	2	2	2	2	Not released

== Game summaries ==
=== Bowling Green ===
Bowling Green Falcons at #2 Oklahoma Sooners

Team	1	2	3	4	Total
Bowling Green	7	3	0	14	24
• #2 Oklahoma	7	17	13	3	40

- Date: September 4
- Location: Gaylord Family Oklahoma Memorial Stadium, Norman, Oklahoma
- Game start: 11:10 a.m. CST
- Elapsed time: 3:26
- Game attendance: 84,319
- Referee: Jon Bible
- TV announcers (ABC): Terry Gannon (Play-by-play), Jamal Anderson (Color), & Mark Morgan (Sideline)

Scoring summary
1	OU	Mark Clayton 6 yard pass from Jason White (Trey DiCarlo kick)	Oklahoma 7–0
1	BGSU	Charles Sharon 18 yard pass from Omar Jacobs (Shaun Suisham kick)	Tie 7–7
2	OU	Kejuan Jones 11 yard run (Trey DiCarlo kick)	Oklahoma 14–7
2	BGSU	Shaun Suisham 47 yard field goal	Oklahoma 14–10
2	OU	Mark Clayton 9 yard pass from Jason White (Trey DiCarlo kick)	Oklahoma 21–10
2	OU	Trey DiCarlo 27 yard field goal	Oklahoma 24–10
3	OU	Will Peoples 24 yard pass from Jason White (kick failed)	Oklahoma 30–10
3	OU	Adrian Peterson 35 yard run (Trey DiCarlo kick)	Oklahoma 37–10
4	BGSU	Charles Sharon 16 yard pass from Omar Jacobs (Shaun Suisham kick)	Oklahoma 37–17
4	BGSU	Keon Newson 28 yard interception return (Shaun Suisham kick)	Oklahoma 37–24
4	OU	Trey DiCarlo 24 yard field goal	Oklahoma 40–24

=== Houston ===
Houston Cougars at #2 Oklahoma Sooners

Team	1	2	3	4	Total
Houston	7	0	0	6	13
• #2 Oklahoma	21	28	7	7	63

- Date: September 11
- Location: Gaylord Family Oklahoma Memorial Stadium, Norman, Oklahoma
- Game start: 6:07 p.m. CST
- Elapsed time: 3:22
- Game attendance: 84,280
- Referee: Drew George
- TV announcers (TBS): Ron Thulin (Play-by-play), Charles Davis (Color), & Craig Sager (Sideline)

=== Oregon ===
Oregon Ducks at #2 Oklahoma Sooners

Team	1	2	3	4	Total
Oregon	0	0	7	0	7
• #2 Oklahoma	0	10	14	7	31

- Date: September 18
- Location: Gaylord Family Oklahoma Memorial Stadium, Norman, Oklahoma
- Game start: 2:40 p.m. CST
- Elapsed time: 3:37
- Game attendance: 84,574
- Referee: Cooper Castleberry
- TV announcers (ABC): Terry Gannon (Play-by-play), Tim Brant, Terry Bowden (Colors), & Sam Ryan (Sideline)

Scoring summary
2	14:56	OKLA	Trey DiCarlo 35 yard field goal	OKLA 3-0
2	6:03	OKLA	James Moses 4 yard pass from Jason White (Trey DiCarlo kick)	OKLA 10-0
3	7:47	OKLA	Donta Hickson 25 yard run (Trey DiCarlo kick)	OKLA 17-0
3	4:15	ORE	Dante Rosario 30 yard pass from Kellen Clemens (Jared Siegel kick)	OKLA 17-7
3	1:15	OKLA	Adrian Peterson 40 yard run (Trey DiCarlo kick)	OKLA 24-7
4	3:36	OKLA	Adrian Peterson 18 yard run (Trey DiCarlo kick)	OKLA 31-7

Statistics

- OKLA: Adrian Peterson 24 Rush, 183 Yds

=== Texas Tech ===
Texas Tech Red Raiders at #2 Oklahoma Sooners

Team	1	2	3	4	Total
Texas Tech	0	3	3	7	13
• #2 Oklahoma	7	7	7	7	28

- Date: October 2
- Location: Gaylord Family Oklahoma Memorial Stadium, Norman, Oklahoma
- Game start: 11:40 a.m. CST
- Elapsed time: 3:10
- Game attendance: 84,580
- Referee: Cooper Castleberry
- TV announcers (FSN): Joel Meyers (Play-by-play), Dave Lapham (Color), & Jim Knox (Sideline)

=== Texas ===
#5 Texas Longhorns vs. #2 Oklahoma Sooners

Team	1	2	3	4	Total
#5 Texas	0	0	0	0	0
• #2 Oklahoma	0	3	3	6	12

- Date: October 9
- Location: Cotton Bowl, Dallas
- Game start: 11:10 a.m. CST
- Elapsed time: 3:12
- Game attendance: 79,587
- Referee: Hal Dowden
- TV announcers (ABC): Brad Nessler (Play-by-play), Bob Griese (Color), & Lynn Swann (Sideline)

=== Kansas State ===
#2 Oklahoma Sooners at Kansas State Wildcats

Team	1	2	3	4	Total
• #2 Oklahoma	7	10	7	7	31
Kansas State	7	7	7	0	21

- Date: October 16
- Location: KSU Stadium, Manhattan, Kansas
- Game start: 11:11 a.m. CST
- Elapsed time: 3:29
- Game attendance: 52,310
- Referee: John Laurie
- TV announcers (ABC): Gary Thorne (Play-by-play), Ed Cunningham (Color), & Jim Gray (Sideline)

=== Kansas ===
Kansas Jayhawks at #2 Oklahoma Sooners

Team	1	2	3	4	Total
Kansas	0	10	0	0	10
• #2 Oklahoma	0	14	14	13	41

- Date: October 23
- Location: Gaylord Family Oklahoma Memorial Stadium, Norman, Oklahoma
- Game start: 12:00 p.m. CST
- Elapsed time: 3:20
- Game attendance: 84,520
- Referee: Drew George
- TV announcers (FSN): Bill Land (Play-by-play), Dave Lapham (Color), & Jim Knox (Sideline)

=== Oklahoma State ===
#2 Oklahoma Sooners at #20 Oklahoma State Cowboys

Team	1	2	3	4	Total
• #2 Oklahoma	7	14	14	3	38
#20 Oklahoma State	0	14	14	7	35

- Date: October 30
- Location: Boone Pickens Stadium, Stillwater, Oklahoma
- Game start: 11:11 a.m. CST
- Elapsed time: 3:32
- Game attendance: 48,837
- Referee: Jon Bible
- TV announcers (ABC): Keith Jackson (Play-by-play), Dan Fouts (Color), & Todd Harris (Sideline)

=== Texas A&M ===
#2 Oklahoma Sooners at #22 Texas A&M Aggies

Team	1	2	3	4	Total
• #2 Oklahoma	7	14	14	7	42
#22 Texas A&M	14	14	0	7	35

- Date: November 6
- Location: Kyle Field, College Station, Texas
- Game start: 2:39 p.m. CST
- Elapsed time: 3:43
- Game attendance: 81,125
- Referee: Steve Usechek
- TV announcers (ABC): Brad Nessler (Play-by-play), Bob Griese (Color), & Lynn Swann (Sideline)

=== Nebraska ===
Nebraska Cornhuskers at #2 Oklahoma Sooners

Team	1	2	3	4	Total
Nebraska	0	0	0	3	3
• #2 Oklahoma	3	20	7	0	30

- Date: November 13
- Location: Gaylord Family Oklahoma Memorial Stadium, Norman, Oklahoma
- Game start: 6:05 p.m. CST
- Elapsed time: 2:49
- Game attendance: 84,916
- Referee: Tom Ahlers
- TV announcers (FSN): Kevin Eschenfelder (Play-by-play), Gary Reasons (Color), & John Rhadigan (Sideline)

=== Baylor ===
#2 Oklahoma Sooners at Baylor Bears

Team	1	2	3	4	Total
• #2 Oklahoma	7	7	14	7	35
Baylor	0	0	0	0	0

- Date: November 20
- Location: Floyd Casey Stadium, Waco, Texas
- Game start: 11:10 a.m. CST
- Elapsed time: 2:54
- Game attendance: 32,182
- Referee: John Laurie
- TV announcers (FSN): Drew Goodman (Play-by-play), Gary Reasons (Color), & John Rhadigan (Sideline)

=== Colorado (Big 12 Championship Game) ===
Colorado Buffaloes vs. #2 Oklahoma Sooners

Team	1	2	3	4	Total
Colorado	0	0	3	0	3
• #2 Oklahoma	14	14	7	7	42

- Date: December 4
- Location: Arrowhead Stadium, Kansas City, Missouri
- Game start: 7:08 p.m. CST
- Elapsed time: 3:10
- Game attendance: 62,130
- Referee: Jon Bible
- TV announcers (ABC): Brad Nessler (Play-by-play), Bob Griese (Color), & Lynn Swann (Sideline)

=== USC (Orange Bowl) ===
#2 Oklahoma Sooners vs. #1 USC Trojans

Team	1	2	3	4	Total
#2 Oklahoma	7	3	0	9	19
• #1 USC	14	24	10	7	55

- Date: January 4
- Location: Pro Player Stadium, Miami Gardens, Florida
- Game start: 7:24 p.m. CST
- Elapsed time: 3:52
- Game attendance: 77,912
- Referee: Steve Shaw
- TV announcers (ABC): Brad Nessler (Play-by-play), Bob Griese (Color), & Lynn Swann (Sideline)

== Personnel ==
=== Coaching staff ===
Name	Position
Bob Stoops	Head coach
Brent Venables	Associate head coach Co-defensive coordinator Linebackers
Bobby Jack Wright	Assistant head coach Defensive ends Special teams Recruiting coordinator
Chuck Long	Offensive coordinator Quarterbacks
Bo Pelini	Co-defensive coordinator Secondary
Kevin Wilson	Co-offensive coordinator Offensive line Run game coordinator
Cale Gundy	Running backs
Jackie Shipp	Defensive line
Kevin Sumlin	Tight ends
Darrell Wyatt	Wide receivers
Mike Ekeler	Graduate assistant

=== Roster ===
(as of April 3, 2019)
Wide receivers: 27 Garrett Bothun – Sophomore; 1 Mark Bradley – Senior; 19 Quentin Chaney – Freshman; 9 Mark Clayton – Senior (C); 26 Ataleo Ford – Senior; 11 Lendy Holmes – Freshman; 81 Brandon Jones – Senior; 29 Will Peoples – Senior; 3 Jejuan Rankins – Junior; 5 David Robinson – Freshman; 33 Fred Strong – Freshman; 32 Sadiki Wilson – Senior; 4 Travis Wilson – Junior; Offensive line: 55 Jammal Brown – Senior; 52 Chris Bush – Junior; 50 Vince Carter – Senior (C); 70 Kelvin Chaisson – Junior; 64 Chris Chester – Junior; 73 John Flynn – Senior; 72 Randy Garibay – Senior; 67 Michael Hallock – Junior; 77 Davin Joseph – Junior; 66 Randy McAdams – Freshman; 79 Chris Messner – Sophomore; 69 Akim Millington – Freshman; 63 J.D. Quinn – Freshman; 59 Brett Rayl – Junior; 75 Antonn Reid – Freshman; 65 Aaron Rothenberg – Sophomore; 71 Cameron Schacht – Freshman; 60 Wes Sims – Senior; 61 Steffen Van Zant – Freshman; Tight ends: 85 Joe Jon Finley – Freshman; 89 James Moses – Senior; 88 Willie Roberts – Junior	Quarterbacks: 7 Rhett Bomar – Freshman; 15 Tommy Grady – Freshman; 12 Paul Thompson – Junior; 18 Jason White – Senior (C); 8 Lee Blankenship – Freshman; Fullbacks: 38 J.D. Runnels – Junior; 39 Dan Townsend – Sophomore; 40 Dane Zaslaw – Freshman; Running backs: 2 Tashard Choice – Freshman; 21 Jacob Gutierrez – Freshman; 35 Donta Hickson – Junior; 20 Kejuan Jones – Junior; 28 Adrian Peterson – Freshman; 30 Courtney Tennial – Freshman; 25 D.J. Wolfe – Freshman; Defensive line: 97 Cory Bennett – Freshman; 92 Larry Birdine – Sophomore; 80 Dan Cody – Senior (C); 86 Alan Davis – Freshman; 91 Alonzo Dotson – Freshman; 45 Jordan Greene – Junior; 95 Grant Hulsey – Senior; 49 Jonathan Jackson – Senior; 82 Laenar Nixon – Sophomore; 99 Vershon Sublet – Senior; 58 Calvin Thibodeaux – Junior; 98 John Williams – Freshman; 90 Steven Coleman – Freshman; 74 Lawrence Dampeer – Freshman; 94 Dusty Dvoracek – Senior; 96 Lynn McGruder – Senior; 93 Remi Ayodele – Junior; 68 Carl Pendleton – Freshman	Linebackers: 42 Rufus Alexander – Sophomore; 48 Gayron Allen – Senior; 16 Lewis Baker – Sophomore; 15 Wayne Chambers – Junior; 36 Russell Dennison – Junior; 44 Clint Ingram – Junior; 46 Zach Latimer – Sophomore; 47 Kolby Paxton – Freshman; 10 Lance Mitchell – Senior (C); 51 Demarrio Pleasant – Freshman; Defensive backs: 5 Brandon Shelby – Senior; 13 Eric Bassey – Junior; 31 Tony Cade – Freshman; 6 Jason Carter – Sophomore; 30 Dan Dixon – Junior; 26 R.J. Harris – Freshman; 17 Tyler Lippe – Sophomore; 27 Jacob Luna – Junior; 8 Donte Nicholson – Senior; 22 Chijioke Onyenegecha – Junior; 28 Antonio Perkins – Senior; 21 Jowahn Poteat – Junior; 25 Darren Stephens – Senior; 43 Joseph Stroud – Freshman; 24 Marcus Walker – Freshman; 68 Jacob Rice – Junior; 14 Brett Bowers – Freshman; 23 Brodney Pool – Junior; 41 Darien Williams – Freshman; Punters: 87 Blake Ferguson – Senior; 17 Cody Freeby – Freshman; Kickers: 83 Trey DiCarlo – Junior; 32 Garrett Hartley
A (C) indicates a captain (named before each game in 1982, and 1995 through 1998).

== Statistics ==
=== Team ===
	OU	Opp
Points per Game	34.8	16.8
First Downs	310	203
Rushing	147	75
Passing	144	110
Penalty	19	18
Rushing Yardage	2,709	1,230
Rushing Attempts	565	402
Avg per Rush	4.8	3.1
Avg per Game	208.4	94.6
Passing Yardage	3,298	2,657
Avg per Game	253.7	204.4
Completions-Attempts	268-406 (66%)	223-410 (54.4%)
Total Offense	6,007	3,887
Total Plays	971	812
Avg per Play	6.2	4.8
Avg per Game	462.1	299
Fumbles-Lost	20-9	18-14

	OU	Opp
Punts-Yards	53-2,184 (41.2 avg)	84-3,493 (41.6 avg)
Punt returns-Total Yards	35-316 (9 avg)	22-95 (4.3 avg)
Kick returns-Total Yards	28-534 (19.1 avg)	35-553 (15.8 avg)
Avg Time of Possession per Game	33:11	26:49
Penalties-Yards	85-733	83-652
Avg per Game	56.4	50.2
3rd Down Conversions	108/200 (54%)	66/182 (36.3%)
4th Down Conversions	12/17 (70.6%)	8/17 (47.1%)
Sacks By-Yards	39-258	9-73
Total TDs	61	28
Rushing	22	10
Passing	36	15
Fields Goals-Attempts	9-17 (52.9%%)	8-11 (72.3%)
PAT-Attempts	57-60 (95%)	27-28 (96.4%)
Total Attendance	507,189	214,454
Games-Avg per Game	6-84,532	4-53,614

=== Scores by quarter ===
	1	2	3	4	Total
Opponents	49	75	44	51	219
Oklahoma	87	161	121	83	452

== 2005 NFL draft ==
The 2005 NFL draft was held on April 23–24, 2005, at the Jacob K. Javits Convention Center in New York City. The following Oklahoma players were either selected or signed as undrafted free agents following the draft.

Player	Position	Round	Overall pick	NFL team
Jammal Brown	OT	1st	13	New Orleans Saints
Mark Clayton	WR	1st	22	Baltimore Ravens
Brodney Pool	DB	2nd	34	Cleveland Browns
Mark Bradley	WR	2nd	39	Chicago Bears
Dan Cody	DE	2nd	53	Baltimore Ravens
Brandon Jones	WR	3rd	96	Tennessee Titans
Antonio Perkins	DB	4th	103	Cleveland Browns
Donte Nicholson	DB	5th	141	Tampa Bay Buccaneers
Mike Hawkins	CB	5th	167	Green Bay Packers
Lance Mitchell	LB	5th	168	Arizona Cardinals
Wes Sims	G	6th	177	San Diego Chargers
Jonathan Jackson	DE	Undrafted		Chicago Bears
Lynn McGruder	DT	Undrafted		Tampa Bay Buccaneers
Jason White	QB	Undrafted		Tennessee Titans
