= 2004 Missouri Tigers football team =

American college football season

2004 Missouri Tigers football
- Conference: Big 12 Conference
- North Division
- Record: 5–6 (3–5 Big 12)
- Head coach: Gary Pinkel (4th season)
- Offensive coordinator: Dave Christensen (4th season)
- Offensive scheme: Spread
- Defensive coordinator: Matt Eberflus (4th season)
- Base defense: 4–3
- Home stadium: Faurot Field (Capacity: 68,349)

2004 Big 12 Conference football standings
	Conf.			Overall
Team	W		L	W		L
North Division
Colorado xy	4	–	4	8	–	5
Iowa State x	4	–	4	7	–	5
Nebraska	3	–	5	5	–	6
Missouri	3	–	5	5	–	6
Kansas	2	–	6	4	–	7
Kansas State	2	–	6	4	–	7
South Division
No. 3 Oklahoma xy$	8	–	0	12	–	1
No. 5 Texas %	7	–	1	11	–	1
Texas A&M	5	–	3	7	–	5
No. 18 Texas Tech	5	–	3	8	–	4
Oklahoma State	4	–	4	7	–	5
Baylor	1	–	7	3	–	8
Championship: Oklahoma 42, Colorado 3
$ – BCS representative as conference champion; % – BCS at-large representative; x – Division champion/co-champions; y – Championship game participant; Rankings from AP Poll

The 2004 Missouri Tigers football team represented the University of Missouri during the 2004 NCAA Division I-A football season. They played their home games at Faurot Field in Columbia, Missouri. They were members of the Big 12 Conference in the North Division. The team was coached by head coach Gary Pinkel.

== Schedule ==
Date	Time	Opponent	Rank	Site	TV	Result	Attendance	Source
September 4	6:00 pm	Arkansas State*	No. 17	Faurot Field; Columbia, Missouri		W 52–20	57,012	
September 9	6:00 pm	at Troy*	No. 17	Movie Gallery Stadium; Troy, Alabama	ESPN2	L 14–24	26,574	
September 18	1:00 pm	Ball State*		Faurot Field; Columbia, Missouri		W 48–0	57,279	
October 2	2:30 pm	Colorado		Faurot Field; Columbia, Missouri	ABC	W 17–9	60,108	
October 9	9:00 pm	at Baylor		Floyd Casey Stadium; Waco, Texas	FSN	W 30–10	22,652	
October 16	2:30 pm	at No. 11 Texas	No. 24	Darrell K Royal–Texas Memorial Stadium; Austin, Texas	ABC	L 20–28	82,981	
October 23	2:30 pm	No. 21 Oklahoma State^{†}		Faurot Field; Columbia, Missouri	ABC	L 17–20	66,133	
October 30	11:00 am	at Nebraska		Memorial Stadium; Lincoln, Nebraska (rivalry)	FSN	L 3–24	77,616	
November 6	11:30 am	Kansas State		Faurot Field; Columbia, Missouri	FSN	L 24–35	63,412	
November 20	1:00 pm	Kansas		Faurot Field; Columbia, Missouri (Border War)		L 14–31	53,480	
November 27	12:00 pm	at Iowa State		Jack Trice Stadium; Ames, Iowa (Battle for the Telephone Trophy)	ABC	W 17–14 ^{OT}	40,626	
*Non-conference game; ^{†}Homecoming; Rankings from Coaches' Poll released prior to the game; All times are in Central time
