= 2004 Texas Longhorns football team =

American college football season

2004 Texas Longhorns football

Rose Bowl champion

Rose Bowl, W 38–37 vs. Michigan
- Conference: Big 12 Conference
- South

Ranking
- Coaches: No. 4
- AP: No. 5
- Record: 11–1 (7–1 Big 12)
- Head coach: Mack Brown (7th season)
- Offensive coordinator: Greg Davis (7th season)
- Offensive scheme: Spread
- Defensive coordinator: Greg Robinson (1st season)
- Base defense: 4–3
- Home stadium: Darrell K Royal–Texas Memorial Stadium (Capacity: 80,092)

2004 Big 12 Conference football standings
	Conf.			Overall
Team	W		L	W		L
North Division
Colorado xy	4	–	4	8	–	5
Iowa State x	4	–	4	7	–	5
Nebraska	3	–	5	5	–	6
Missouri	3	–	5	5	–	6
Kansas	2	–	6	4	–	7
Kansas State	2	–	6	4	–	7
South Division
No. 3 Oklahoma xy$	8	–	0	12	–	1
No. 5 Texas %	7	–	1	11	–	1
Texas A&M	5	–	3	7	–	5
No. 18 Texas Tech	5	–	3	8	–	4
Oklahoma State	4	–	4	7	–	5
Baylor	1	–	7	3	–	8
Championship: Oklahoma 42, Colorado 3
$ – BCS representative as conference champion; % – BCS at-large representative; x – Division champion/co-champions; y – Championship game participant; Rankings from AP Poll

The 2004 Texas Longhorns football team represented the University of Texas at Austin in the 2004 NCAA Division I-A football season. The team was coached by head football coach Mack Brown and led on the field by quarterback Vince Young. Ranked third in wins in Division I-A college football history, the University of Texas has traditionally been considered a college football powerhouse, but Brown had not managed to lead the Longhorns into a Bowl Championship Series (BCS) game. The 2004 season included some controversy related to the selection of Texas as an at-large team to attend the 2005 Rose Bowl. Brown coached the team to win that game with a thrilling last-second victory. The victory brought the Longhorns to 11 wins and 1 loss for the season (11–1) and it earned the Longhorns a top 5 finish in the polls.

== Schedule ==
Date	Time	Opponent	Rank	Site	TV	Result	Attendance
September 4	6:00 p.m.	North Texas*	No. 7	Darrell K Royal–Texas Memorial Stadium; Austin, TX	PPV	W 65–0	82,956
September 11	7:45 p.m.	at Arkansas*	No. 7	Donald W. Reynolds Razorback Stadium; Fayetteville, AR (rivalry)	ESPN	W 22–20	75,671
September 25	6:00 p.m.	Rice*	No. 5	Darrell K Royal–Texas Memorial Stadium; Austin, TX (rivalry)	FSN	W 35–13	82,931
October 2	11:30 a.m.	Baylor	No. 5	Darrell K Royal–Texas Memorial Stadium; Austin, TX (rivalry)	PPV	W 44–14	82,626
October 9	11:00 a.m.	vs. No. 2 Oklahoma	No. 5	Cotton Bowl; Dallas, TX (Red River Shootout)	ABC	L 0–12	79,587
October 16	2:30 p.m.	Missouri^{†}	No. 9	Darrell K Royal–Texas Memorial Stadium; Austin, TX	ABC	W 28–20	82,981
October 23	6:00 p.m.	at Texas Tech	No. 8	Jones SBC Stadium; Lubbock, TX (Battle for the Chancellor's Spurs)	TBS	W 51–21	55,413
October 30	2:30 p.m.	at Colorado	No. 8	Folsom Field; Boulder, CO	ABC	W 31–7	51,751
November 6	6:00 p.m.	No. 19 Oklahoma State	No. 6	Darrell K Royal–Texas Memorial Stadium; Austin, TX	TBS	W 56–35	83,181
November 13	11:00 a.m.	at Kansas	No. 6	Memorial Stadium; Lawrence, KS	FSN	W 27–23	38,714
November 26	2:30 p.m.	No. 22 Texas A&M	No. 6	Darrell K Royal–Texas Memorial Stadium; Austin, TX (rivalry)	ABC	W 26–13	83,891
January 1, 2005	4:00 p.m.	vs. No. 13 Michigan*	No. 6	Rose Bowl; Pasadena, CA (Rose Bowl)	ABC	W 38–37	93,468
*Non-conference game; ^{†}Homecoming; Rankings from AP Poll released prior to the game; All times are in Central time

== Season highlights ==
In 2004, the Longhorns began the season with a No. 7 ranking nationally and started out with a 65–0 blowout of North Texas, setting several UT school records in the process. This was followed by a narrow 22–20 win against unranked Arkansas. They defeated Rice and Baylor 35–13 and 44–14 respectively.

This left them ranked fifth coming into the annual matchup with then No. 2 Oklahoma in the Red River Shootout. Oklahoma shut-out the Longhorns 12–0. Texas dropped to No. 9, before rebounding with wins over No. 24 Missouri 28–20, at No. 24 Texas Tech 51–21, and at Colorado 31–7.

Then Texas set a record for the largest come from-behind-win in school history, beating No. 19 Oklahoma State 56–35 after falling behind 7–35. After this performance, Texas again fell behind against Kansas but squeaked out a win 27–23. Kansas coach Mark Mangino stirred up controversy by claiming that the officials were biased in favor of Texas.

This brought UT back up to No. 5 in the rankings as they welcomed arch-rival Texas A&M to Austin and won 26–13. However, Oklahoma stood undefeated, which meant the Sooners would represent the Big 12 South in the Championship game against a much lower ranked team from the North Division. Once again, the loss to Oklahoma had kept Texas out of playing for a National or Conference Title, and had seemingly destined them to a non-Bowl Championship Series bowl as well.

However, Brown began lobbying the voters in the two polls based on human voters (one on college football coaches, the other on Associated Press (AP) writers) to place the Longhorns high enough in the rankings to ensure they received a Bowl Championship Series (BCS) bowl-bid. The rules of the BCS were such that Texas might get left out of the eight chosen teams even though they ranked fifth nationally. The No. 4 California Golden Bears won their final regular season game 26–16 over 24-point underdog Southern Miss. Cal did not try to run-up the score at the end of the game. Several AP voters were besieged by fan emails and phone calls attempting to sway their votes, apparently spurred from Brown's pleas to rank Texas ahead of other "less deserving teams." Nine of the 65 AP voters switched Texas ahead of Cal, and three of them were from Texas. In the coaches poll, four voters moved Cal down to No. 7 and two to No. 8, when the week before none had them lower than No. 6. Meanwhile, two coaches moved Texas up to No. 3 when the team did not play that week. The Los Angeles Times wrote that accusations were raised about coaches manipulated voting, but the individual coaches' votes were not released to prove or disprove the allegations. The AP Poll makes its voters' records public. No. 6 Texas gained 23 points on No. 4 Cal in the AP poll, and the fifth-ranked Longhorns closed 43 points on the fourth-ranked Bears in the coaches poll. That allowed Texas to earn a BCS berth, finishing .0129 points ahead of Cal in the BCS standings after being .0013 points behind. In part because of the controversy with Texas' and Cal's BCS ranking, the AP poll withdrew from the BCS after the season. This lobbying effort and ensuing result led to criticism of Brown for playing politics to get his team into a top bowl. Thus, he was no longer criticized for failing to get into a top bowl, he was criticized for doing so (and the way he had done it).

=== Rose Bowl ===
#12/13 Michigan vs. #5/6 Texas
Rose Bowl

Team	1	2	3	4	Total
Michigan	0	14	17	6	37
• Texas	7	7	7	17	38

- Date: Saturday, January 1
- Location: Rose Bowl, Pasadena, California
- Game start: 2:00 P.M. PST
- Elapsed time: 3:35
- Game attendance: 93,468
- Referee: Dennis Hennigan
- TV announcers (ABC): Keith Jackson (Play-by-play), Dan Fouts (Color), & Todd Harris (Sideline)
- Source: ESPN

Scoring summary
1	1:41	TEX	Vince Young 20-yard run (Dusty Mangum kick)	TEX 7-0
2	12:08	MICH	Braylon Edwards 39-yard pass from Chad Henne (Garrett Rivas kick)	Tied 7-7
2	4:16	TEX	David Thomas 11-yard pass from Vince Young (Dusty Magnum kick)	TEX 14-7
2	0:20	MICH	Braylon Edwards 8-yard pass from Chad Henne (Garrett Rivas kick)	Tied 14-14
3	12:53	TEX	Vince Young 60-yard run (Dusty Magnum kick)	TEX 21-14
3	12:23	MICH	Steve Breaston 50-yard pass from Chad Henne (Garrett Rivas kick)	Tied 21-21
3	6:29	MICH	Braylon Edwards 9-yard pass from Chad Henne (Garrett Rivas kick)	MICH 28-21
3	2:35	MICH	Garrett Rivas 44-yard field goal	MICH 31-21
4	9:51	TEX	Vince Young 10-yard run (Dusty Mangum kick)	MICH 31-28
4	6:09	MICH	Garrett Rivas 32-yard field goal	MICH 34-28
4	4:56	TEX	Vince Young 23-yard run (Dusty Mangum kick)	TEX 35-34
4	3:04	MICH	Garrett Rivas 42-yard field goal	MICH 37-35
4	0:00	TEX	Dusty Mangum 37-yard field goal	TEX 38-37

The appearance in the "Grand-daddy" of all bowl games was the first visit by the Longhorns, due mainly to the fact that the Rose Bowl traditionally pitted the winner of the Pac-10 against the winner of the Big Ten. Texas' opponent was Michigan, whom Texas was playing for the very first time. Texas and Michigan each had over 100 years of football history. The meeting of the two teams set a college football record for the most games played collectively by two opponents before facing each other for the first time.

Texas won the game 38–37 on a last second field goal kick by Longhorn Dusty Mangum in what had been called one of the greatest Rose Bowl games of all time. It was the only time in the history of the Rose Bowl that the game has been decided as time expired off the clock. Vince Young set several Rose Bowl records and also won the Rose Bowl MVP award.

== After the season ==
In the NFL draft that followed, three Longhorns were drafted – RB Cedric Benson went 4th overall to Chicago Bears and Derrick Johnson went 15th overall to the Kansas City Chiefs. TE Bo Scaife was picked in the 6th round by the Tennessee Titans and would be later reunited with quarterback Vince Young

With the exception of these players, most of the team returned to play for the 2005 Texas Longhorns football team, including redshirt sophomore quarterback Vince Young. Therefore, expectations were high coming into the 2005 season. At the trophy presentation in Pasadena, Vince Young had proclaimed, "We'll be back!", referencing the fact that the Rose Bowl was the host for the next year's BCS National Championship.

== See also ==
- Bowl Championship Series controversies
