= 2004 Iowa State Cyclones football team =

American college football season

2004 Iowa State Cyclones football

Big 12 North co-champion Independence Bowl champion

Independence Bowl, W 17–13 vs Miami (OH)
- Conference: Big 12 Conference
- North Division
- Record: 7–5 (4–4 Big 12)
- Head coach: Dan McCarney (10th season)
- Offensive coordinator: Barney Cotton (1st season)
- Offensive scheme: Spread
- Defensive coordinator: John Skladany (8th season)
- Base defense: 4–3
- Home stadium: Jack Trice Stadium

2004 Big 12 Conference football standings
	Conf.			Overall
Team	W		L	W		L
North Division
Colorado xy	4	–	4	8	–	5
Iowa State x	4	–	4	7	–	5
Nebraska	3	–	5	5	–	6
Missouri	3	–	5	5	–	6
Kansas	2	–	6	4	–	7
Kansas State	2	–	6	4	–	7
South Division
No. 3 Oklahoma xy$	8	–	0	12	–	1
No. 5 Texas %	7	–	1	11	–	1
Texas A&M	5	–	3	7	–	5
No. 18 Texas Tech	5	–	3	8	–	4
Oklahoma State	4	–	4	7	–	5
Baylor	1	–	7	3	–	8
Championship: Oklahoma 42, Colorado 3
$ – BCS representative as conference champion; % – BCS at-large representative; x – Division champion/co-champions; y – Championship game participant; Rankings from AP Poll

The 2004 Iowa State Cyclones football team represented Iowa State University as a member of the North Division in the Big 12 Conference during the 2004 NCAA Division I-A football season. Led by tenth-year head coach Dan McCarney, the Cyclones compiled an overall record of 7–5 with a mark of 4–4 in conference play, sharing the Big 12's North Division title with Colorado. Iowa State was invited to the Independence Bowl, where the Cyclones defeated the Miami RedHawks. The team played home games at Jack Trice Stadium in Ames, Iowa.

== Schedule ==
Date	Time	Opponent	Site	TV	Result	Attendance	Source
September 3	1:00 p.m.	Northern Iowa*	Jack Trice Stadium; Ames, IA		W 23–0	42,865	
September 11	11:00 a.m.	at No. 16 Iowa*	Kinnick Stadium; Iowa City, IA (rivalry)	ESPN Plus	L 10–17	70,397	
September 18	11:30 a.m.	Northern Illinois*	Jack Trice Stadium; Ames, IA	FSN	W 48–41	39,902	
October 2	1:00 p.m.	at No. 25 Oklahoma State	Boone Pickens Stadium; Stillwater, OK		L 7–36	47,554	
October 9	6:00 p.m.	Texas A&M^{†}	Jack Trice Stadium; Ames, IA	PPV	L 3–34	44,307	
October 16	12:30 p.m.	at Colorado	Folsom Field; Boulder, CO	FSN	L 14–19	44,285	
October 23	2:00 p.m.	at Baylor	Floyd Casey Stadium; Waco, TX		W 26–25	25,249	
October 30	1:00 p.m.	Kansas	Jack Trice Stadium; Ames, IA		W 13–7	36,384	
November 6	1:00 p.m.	Nebraska	Jack Trice Stadium; Ames, IA (rivalry)		W 34–27	45,022	
November 20	11:00 a.m.	at Kansas State	KSU Stadium; Manhattan, KS (rivalry)	FSN	W 37–23	44,829	
November 27	12:00 p.m.	Missouri	Jack Trice Stadium; Ames, IA (rivalry)	ABC	L 14–17 ^{OT}	40,626	
December 28	5:30 p.m.	vs. Miami (OH)*	Independence Stadium; Shreveport, LA (Independence Bowl)	ESPN	W 17–13	43,000	
*Non-conference game; ^{†}Homecoming; Rankings from AP Poll released prior to the game; All times are in Central time
