= Mike Hawkins (cornerback) =

American football player (born 1983)

No. 37
- Position: Cornerback

Personal information
- Born: July 15, 1983 (age 43); Dallas, Texas, U.S.
- Listed height: 6 ft 1 in (1.85 m)
- Listed weight: 185 lb (84 kg)

Career information
- High school: R. L. Turner (Carrolton, Texas)
- College: Oklahoma
- NFL draft: 2005: 5th round, 167th overall pick

Career history
- Dallas Desperados (2004–2005); Green Bay Packers (2005); Cleveland Browns (2006); Minnesota Vikings (2006–2007); Dallas Cowboys (2009)*; Tampa Bay Buccaneers (2009)*; Oakland Raiders (2009)*
- * Offseason or practice squad member only

Career NFL statistics
- Tackles: 14
- Pass deflections: 2
- Stats at Pro Football Reference
- Stats at ArenaFan.com

Michael Hawkins (born July 15, 1983) is an American former professional football player who was a cornerback in the National Football League (NFL). He was signed by the Dallas Desperados of the Arena Football League (AFL) in 2004 and selected by the Green Bay Packers in the fifth round of the 2005 NFL draft. He played college football for the Oklahoma Sooners. He was picked up by the Minnesota Vikings off of waivers in 2006.

Hawkins was also a member of the Cleveland Browns, Dallas Cowboys, Tampa Bay Buccaneers, and Oakland Raiders.

== College career ==
In his only season at Oklahoma, Hawkins played in five games during the 2002 season. He recorded five tackles (4 solos) with a pass deflection and returned an interception 45 yards for a touchdown vs. UTEP. He left the team after the season to play for the Arena Football League's Dallas Desperados.
