= 2005 Cotton Bowl Classic =

2005 SBC Cotton Bowl Classic
- 69th Cotton Bowl Classic
- The Cotton Bowl in Dallas, Texas, hosted the Cotton Bowl Classic.
Tennessee Volunteers	Texas A&M Aggies
(9–3)	(7–4)
SEC	Big 12
38	7
Head coach: Phillip Fulmer	Head coach: Dennis Franchione
AP / Coaches / BCS; 15 / 17 / 15	AP / Coaches / BCS; 22 / 25 / 20
	1	2	3	4	Total
Tennessee	7	21	10	0	38
Texas A&M	0	0	0	7	7
- Date: January 1, 2005
- Season: 2004
- Stadium: Cotton Bowl
- Location: Dallas, Texas
- MVP: QB Rick Clausen (Tennessee); DT Justin Harrell (Tennessee)
- Referee: Bill Alge (MAC)
- Attendance: 75,704

United States TV coverage
- Network: Fox
- Announcers: Thom Brennaman and Brian Baldinger

The 2005 Cotton Bowl Classic was a post-season college football bowl game between the Tennessee Volunteers and the Texas A&M Aggies on January 1, 2005, at the Cotton Bowl in Dallas, Texas. It was the final game of the 2004 NCAA Division I FBS football season for each team and resulted in a 38–7 Tennessee victory. Tennessee represented the Southeastern Conference (SEC) while Texas A&M represented the Big 12 Conference.

== Game summary ==
Tennessee was up 38–0 before A&M scored late to make the final score 38–7 as A&M turned the ball over 5 times (4 on fumbles) and Rick Clausen went 18 of 27 for 222 yards. McNeal went 23 of 38 for 241 yards and set a new school single-season passing yards record, but only had one touchdown while throwing an interception.
