= 2004 Houston Bowl =

2004 EV1.net Houston Bowl
UTEP Miners	Colorado Buffaloes
(8–3)	(7–5)
WAC	Big 12
28	33
Head coach: Mike Price	Head coach: Gary Barnett
	1	2	3	4	Total
UTEP	14	7	0	7	28
Colorado	3	10	6	14	33
- Date: December 29, 2004
- Season: 2004
- Stadium: Reliant Stadium
- Location: Houston, Texas
- Referee: Karl Richins (Mtn. West)
- Attendance: 27,235
- Payout: US$1,100,000 per team

United States TV coverage
- Network: ESPN

The 2004 EV1.net Houston Bowl was the fifth edition of the college football bowl game, and was played at Reliant Stadium in Houston, Texas. The game pitted the Colorado Buffaloes from the Big 12 Conference and the UTEP Miners from the Western Athletic Conference (WAC). The game was the final competition of the 2004 football season for each team and resulted in a 33–28 Colorado victory.

== Scoring summary ==
First quarter

- Colorado Mason Crosby 26 yard field goal. 3–0 Colorado
- UTEP Howard Jackson 7 yard touchdown run. 7–3 UTEP
- UTEP Josh Chamois 1 yard touchdown run. 14–3 UTEP

Second quarter

- Colorado Hugh Charles 1 yard touchdown run. 14–10 UTEP
- Colorado Mason Crosby 54 yard field goal. 14–13 UTEP
- UTEP Jordan Palmer 17 yard touchdown pass to Jayson Boyd. 21–13 UTEP

Third quarter

- Colorado Mason Crosby 37 yard field goal. 21–16 UTEP
- Colorado Mason Crosby 20 yard field goal. 21–19 UTEP

Fourth quarter

- UTEP Jordan Palmer 4 yard touchdown pass to Johnnie Lee Higgins, Jr. 28–19 UTEP
- Colorado Joel Klatt 78 yard touchdown pass to Joe Klopfenstein. 28–26 UTEP
- Colorado Joel Klatt 39 yard touchdown pass to Evan Judge. 33–28 Colorado

== Statistics ==
Statistics	Colorado	UTEP
First downs	23	19
Rushing attempts-Yards	44-157	27-34
Passing yards	333	328
Passes	33-24-0	42-22-2
Total offense	77-490	69-362
Fumbles-Lost	0-0	1-1
Interceptions-Yards	2-1	0-0
Penalties-Yards	10-83	4-43
Punts-Yards	4-50.0	5-45.0
Punt returns-Yards	2-2	2-11
Kickoff returns-Yards	5-83	1-16
Sacks by: Number-Yards	2-8	3-21
Time of Possession	37:09	22:51
