= Andrew Shanle =

American football player and coach (born 1983)

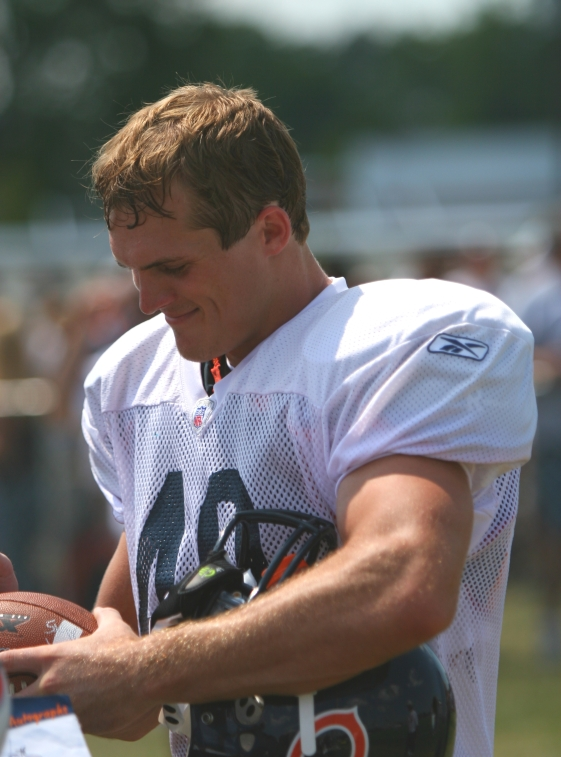
- Shanle signs an autograph at the Chicago Bears 2007 training camp.

Cypress Ridge High School
- Title: Head coach

Personal information
- Born: March 9, 1983 (age 43); Norfolk, Nebraska, U.S.
- Listed height: 6 ft 1 in (1.85 m)
- Listed weight: 210 lb (95 kg)

Career information
- Position: Defensive back
- High school: St. Edward (NE)
- College: Nebraska
- NFL draft: 2007: undrafted

Career history

Playing
- Chicago Bears (2007)*; New York Giants (2007)*
- * Offseason or practice squad member only

Coaching
- Brenham (TX) (2008) Assistant; Cedar Creek (TX) (2010) Assistant; Cypress (TX) Ranch (2011–12) Defensive coordinator; Fremont (NE) (2012–2013) Director of Cross Country and Track & Field; Cypress (TX) Ranch (2013–2019) Defensive coordinator; Cypress (TX) Ridge (2019–Present) Head coach/Campus Coordinator

Awards and highlights
- Super Bowl champion (XLII); 3× First-team Academic All-Big 12 (2004–2006)

Andrew Shanle (born March 9, 1983) is an American football coach and former player. He is the current head football coach and athletic director for Cypress Ridge High School, a 6A program in Houston, Texas. He played cornerback and safety. He was originally signed by the Chicago Bears as an undrafted free agent in 2007. He played 8 man high school football at St. Edward High School (Nebraska) and attended the University of Nebraska on full scholarship.

He is the young brother of NFL linebacker Scott Shanle.

Shanle was signed to the New York Giants' practice squad on December 4, 2007. He remained on the team during their historic Super Bowl win. He did not return to an NFL roster after the 2007 season.

== Coaching career ==
Shanle moved to Texas in 2008 for an assistant coaching position at 4A Brenham High School. After two years and an appearance in the 2009 Texas High School State Finals (vs. Aledo), he assisted in the opening of Cedar Creek High School in 2010. Prior to the 2011 season, he accepted the defensive coordinator position at (6A Texas) Cypress Ranch High School. In 2012, Shanle returned to Nebraska to serve as the Director of Cross Country and Track & Field coach at Midland University in Fremont, Nebraska. After one year, he returned to Texas to once again serve as Defensive Coordinator at 6A Cypress Ranch High School. In 2014, the Mustangs of Cypress Ranch finished the season 13–3 with a loss to Allen HS in his second Texas High School State Finals appearance.
