= 2004 Texas A&M Aggies football team =

American college football season

2004 Texas A&M Aggies football

Cotton Bowl Classic, L 7–38 vs. Tennessee
- Conference: Big 12 Conference
- South Division
- Record: 7–5 (5–3 Big 12)
- Head coach: Dennis Franchione (2nd season)
- Offensive coordinator: Les Koenning (2nd season)
- Offensive scheme: Multiple
- Defensive coordinator: Carl Torbush (2nd season)
- Base defense: 4–2–5
- Home stadium: Kyle Field

2004 Big 12 Conference football standings
	Conf.			Overall
Team	W		L	W		L
North Division
Colorado xy	4	–	4	8	–	5
Iowa State x	4	–	4	7	–	5
Nebraska	3	–	5	5	–	6
Missouri	3	–	5	5	–	6
Kansas	2	–	6	4	–	7
Kansas State	2	–	6	4	–	7
South Division
No. 3 Oklahoma xy$	8	–	0	12	–	1
No. 5 Texas %	7	–	1	11	–	1
Texas A&M	5	–	3	7	–	5
No. 18 Texas Tech	5	–	3	8	–	4
Oklahoma State	4	–	4	7	–	5
Baylor	1	–	7	3	–	8
Championship: Oklahoma 42, Colorado 3
$ – BCS representative as conference champion; % – BCS at-large representative; x – Division champion/co-champions; y – Championship game participant; Rankings from AP Poll

The 2004 Texas A&M Aggies football team completed the season with a 7–5 record. The Aggies had a regular season Big 12 record of 5–3.

== Schedule ==
Date	Time	Opponent	Rank	Site	TV	Result	Attendance
September 2	6:30 pm	at No. 20 Utah*		Rice–Eccles Stadium; Salt Lake City, UT	ESPN	L 21–41	45,419
September 11	2:30 pm	Wyoming*		Kyle Field; College Station, TX	FSN	W 31–0	65,600
September 18	6:00 pm	No. 25 Clemson*		Kyle Field; College Station, TX	TBS	W 27–6	71,565
October 2	6:00 pm	Kansas State		Kyle Field; College Station, TX	TBS	W 42–30	72,675
October 9	6:00 pm	at Iowa State		Jack Trice Stadium; Ames, IA	PPV	W 34–3	44,307
October 16	6:00 pm	at No. 16 Oklahoma State	No. 23	Boone Pickens Stadium; Stillwater, OK	FSN	W 36–20	47,800
October 23	12:30 pm	Colorado	No. 17	Kyle Field; College Station, TX		W 29–26 ^{OT}	73,745
October 30	6:00 pm	at Baylor	No. 16	Floyd Casey Stadium; Waco, TX (Battle of the Brazos)		L 34–35 ^{OT}	41,283
November 6	2:30 pm	No. 2 Oklahoma	No. 22	Kyle Field; College Station, TX	ABC	L 35–42	81,125
November 13	2:30 pm	Texas Tech	No. 22	Kyle Field; College Station, TX (rivalry)	ABC	W 32–25 ^{OT}	82,278
November 26	2:30 pm	at No. 6 Texas	No. 22	Darrell K Royal–Texas Memorial Stadium; Austin, TX (rivalry)	ABC	L 13–26	83,891
January 1	10:00 am	vs. No. 15 Tennessee*	No. 22	Cotton Bowl; Dallas, TX (Cotton Bowl Classic)	FOX	L 7–38	75,704
*Non-conference game; Rankings from AP Poll released prior to the game; All times are in Central time

== Game summaries ==
=== Utah ===
	1	2	3	4	Total
Texas A&M	0	7	0	14	21
Utah	7	20	7	7	41

=== Wyoming ===
	1	2	3	4	Total
Wyoming	0	0	0	0	0
Texas A&M	7	3	7	14	31

=== Clemson ===
	1	2	3	4	Total
Clemson	0	6	0	0	6
Texas A&M	0	17	7	3	27

=== Kansas State ===
	1	2	3	4	Total
Kansas State	7	7	3	13	30
Texas A&M	7	14	7	14	42

=== Iowa State ===
	1	2	3	4	Total
Texas A&M	13	7	7	7	34
Iowa State	3	0	0	0	3

=== Oklahoma State ===
	1	2	3	4	Total
Texas A&M	14	13	9	0	36
Oklahoma State	0	6	0	14	20

=== Colorado ===
	1	2	3	4	OT	Total
Colorado	3	10	6	7	0	26
Texas A&M	0	7	3	16	3	29

=== Baylor ===
	1	2	3	4	OT	Total
Texas A&M	3	10	0	14	7	34
Baylor	0	3	10	14	8	35

=== Oklahoma ===
	1	2	3	4	Total
Oklahoma	7	14	14	7	42
Texas A&M	14	14	0	7	35

=== Texas Tech ===
	1	2	3	4	OT	Total
Texas Tech	0	7	0	18	0	25
Texas A&M	6	0	6	13	7	32

=== Texas ===
	1	2	3	4	Total
Texas A&M	6	7	0	0	13
Texas	6	0	13	7	26

=== Tennessee (Cotton Bowl Classic) ===
	1	2	3	4	Total
Tennessee	7	21	10	0	38
Texas A&M	0	0	0	7	7
