= 2004 Colorado Buffaloes football team =

American college football season

2004 Colorado Buffaloes football

Big 12 North co-champion Houston Bowl champion

Big 12 Championship Game, L 3–42 vs. Oklahoma

Houston Bowl, W 33–28 vs. UTEP
- Conference: Big 12 Conference
- North Division
- Record: 8–5 (4–4 Big 12)
- Head coach: Gary Barnett (6th season)
- Offensive coordinator: Shawn Watson (5th season)
- Offensive scheme: Multiple
- Defensive coordinator: Mike Hankwitz (8th season)
- Base defense: Multiple 4–3
- Captains: Joel Klatt; Matt McChesney; Bobby Purify; Sam Wilder
- Home stadium: Folsom Field

2004 Big 12 Conference football standings
	Conf.			Overall
Team	W		L	W		L
North Division
Colorado xy	4	–	4	8	–	5
Iowa State x	4	–	4	7	–	5
Nebraska	3	–	5	5	–	6
Missouri	3	–	5	5	–	6
Kansas	2	–	6	4	–	7
Kansas State	2	–	6	4	–	7
South Division
No. 3 Oklahoma xy$	8	–	0	12	–	1
No. 5 Texas %	7	–	1	11	–	1
Texas A&M	5	–	3	7	–	5
No. 18 Texas Tech	5	–	3	8	–	4
Oklahoma State	4	–	4	7	–	5
Baylor	1	–	7	3	–	8
Championship: Oklahoma 42, Colorado 3
$ – BCS representative as conference champion; % – BCS at-large representative; x – Division champion/co-champions; y – Championship game participant; Rankings from AP Poll

The 2004 Colorado Buffaloes football team represented the University of Colorado at Boulder in the 2004 NCAA Division I-A football season. The team played their home games in Folsom Field in Boulder, Colorado. They participated in the Big 12 Conference in the North Division. They were coached by head coach Gary Barnett.

== Schedule ==
Date	Time	Opponent	Site	TV	Result	Attendance	Source
September 4	6:00 pm	Colorado State*	Folsom Field; Boulder, Co (Rocky Mountain Showdown)	FSN	W 27–24	54,954	
September 11	1:30 pm	at Washington State*	Qwest Field; Seattle, WA	ABC	W 20–12	56,188	
September 18	5:00 pm	North Texas*	Folsom Field; Boulder, CO	PPV	W 52–21	46,355	
October 2	1:30 pm	at Missouri	Faurot Field; Columbia, MO	ABC	L 9–17	60,108	
October 9	1:30 pm	No. 21 Oklahoma State^{†}	Folsom Field; Boulder, CO	ABC	L 14–42	46,521	
October 16	11:30 am	Iowa State	Folsom Field; Boulder, CO	FSN	W 19–14	44,285	
October 23	11:30 am	at No. 17 Texas A&M	Kyle Field; College Station, TX		L 26–29 ^{OT}	73,745	
October 30	1:30 pm	No. 8 Texas	Folsom Field; Boulder, CO	ABC	L 7–31	51,571	
November 6	11:30 am	at Kansas	Memorial Stadium; Lawrence, KS		W 30–21	38,214	
November 13	12:30 pm	Kansas State	Folsom Field; Boulder, CO (rivalry)		W 38–31	46,502	
November 26	10:00 am	at Nebraska	Memorial Stadium; Lincoln, NE (rivalry)	ABC	W 26–20	77,661	
December 4	6:00 pm	vs. No. 2 Oklahoma	Arrowhead Stadium; Kansas City, MO (Big 12 Championship Game)	ABC	L 3–42	62,310	
December 29	2:30 pm	vs. UTEP*	Reliant Stadium; Houston, TX (Houston Bowl)	ESPN	W 33–28	27,235	
*Non-conference game; ^{†}Homecoming; Rankings from AP Poll released prior to the game; All times are in Mountain time

== Personnel ==
=== Coaching staff ===
- Head Coach: Gary Barnett
- Assistants: Brian Cabral (AHC/ILB), Shawn Watson (OC/QB), Mike Hankwitz (DC/OLB), Dave Borbely (OL), Craig Bray (DB), Ted Gilmore (WR), Shawn Simms (RB), Chris Wilson (DL), John Wristen (TE)

== Awards ==
- All-Big 12: PK Mason Crosby (1st, AP/Coaches)
- Big 12 Freshman of the Year (Defense): ILB Jordan Dizon
- Big 12 Coach of the Year: Gary Barnett
- Zack Jordan Award (Team MVP): TB Bobby Purify
- John Mack Award (Outstanding Offensive Player): TB Bobby Purify
- Dave Jones Award (Outstanding Defensive Player): DT Matt McChesney
- Lee Willard Award (Outstanding Freshman): ILB Jordan Dizon
- Dean Jacob Van Ek Award: PK J.T. Eberly
- Derek Singleton Award: DT Matt McChesney
- Bill McCartney Award: PK Mason Crosby
