= 2004 Oklahoma State Cowboys football team =

American college football season

2004 Oklahoma State Cowboys football

Alamo Bowl, L 7–33 vs. Ohio State
- Conference: Big 12 Conference
- South Division
- Record: 7–5 (4–4 Big 12)
- Head coach: Les Miles (4th season)
- Offensive coordinator: Mike Gundy (5th season)
- Offensive scheme: Pro spread
- Defensive coordinator: Bill Clay (4th season)
- Base defense: 3–4
- Home stadium: Boone Pickens Stadium

2004 Big 12 Conference football standings
| | Conf. | | | Overall |
| Team | W | | L | W | | L |
|---|---|---|---|---|---|---|
North Division
| Colorado xy | 4 | – | 4 | 8 | – | 5 |
| Iowa State x | 4 | – | 4 | 7 | – | 5 |
| Nebraska | 3 | – | 5 | 5 | – | 6 |
| Missouri | 3 | – | 5 | 5 | – | 6 |
| Kansas | 2 | – | 6 | 4 | – | 7 |
| Kansas State | 2 | – | 6 | 4 | – | 7 |
South Division
| No. 3 Oklahoma xy$ | 8 | – | 0 | 12 | – | 1 |
| No. 5 Texas % | 7 | – | 1 | 11 | – | 1 |
| Texas A&M | 5 | – | 3 | 7 | – | 5 |
| No. 18 Texas Tech | 5 | – | 3 | 8 | – | 4 |
| Oklahoma State | 4 | – | 4 | 7 | – | 5 |
| Baylor | 1 | – | 7 | 3 | – | 8 |
Championship: Oklahoma 42, Colorado 3
$ – BCS representative as conference champion; % – BCS at-large representative; x – Division champion/co-champions; y – Championship game participant; Rankings from AP Poll

The 2004 Oklahoma State Cowboys football team represented Oklahoma State University as a member of the Big 12 Conference during the 2004 NCAA Division I-A football season. Led by Les Miles in his fourth and final season as head coach, the Cowboys compiled an overall record of 7–5 with a mark of 4–4 in conference play, placing fifth in the Big 12's South Division. Oklahoma State was invited to the Alamo Bowl, where the Cowboys lost to Ohio State. The team played home games at Boone Pickens Stadium in Stillwater, Oklahoma.

Miles resigned after the season to become the head football coach at Louisiana State University (LSU).

== Schedule ==
| Date | Time | Opponent | Rank | Site | TV | Result | Attendance | Source |
|---|---|---|---|---|---|---|---|---|
| September 4 | 2:30 p.m. | at UCLA* | | Rose Bowl; Pasadena, CA | ABC | W 31–20 | 48,702 | |
| September 11 | 6:00 p.m. | Tulsa* | | Boone Pickens Stadium; Stillwater, OK (rivalry) | PPV | W 38–21 | 47,307 | |
| September 18 | 6:00 p.m. | SMU* | | Boone Pickens Stadium; Stillwater, OK | | W 59–7 | 46,073 | |
| October 2 | 1:00 p.m. | Iowa State | No. 25 | Boone Pickens Stadium; Stillwater, OK | | W 36–7 | 47,554 | |
| October 9 | 2:30 p.m. | at Colorado | No. 22 | Folsom Field; Boulder, CO | ABC | W 42–14 | 46,521 | |
| October 16 | 6:00 p.m. | No. 23 Texas A&M^{†} | No. 16 | Boone Pickens Stadium; Stillwater, OK | FSN | L 20–36 | 47,800 | |
| October 23 | 2:30 p.m. | at Missouri | No. 22 | Faurot Field; Columbia, MO | ABC | W 20–17 | 66,133 | |
| October 30 | 11:00 a.m. | No. 2 Oklahoma | No. 20 | Boone Pickens Stadium; Stillwater, OK (Bedlam Series, College GameDay) | ABC | L 35–38 | 48,837 | |
| November 6 | 6:00 p.m. | at No. 6 Texas | No. 19 | Darrell K Royal–Texas Memorial Stadium; Austin, TX | TBS | L 35–56 | 83,181 | |
| November 13 | 1:00 p.m. | Baylor | No. 25 | Boone Pickens Stadium; Stillwater, OK | | W 49–21 | 43,261 | |
| November 27 | 2:30 p.m. | at Texas Tech | No. 23 | Jones SBC Stadium; Lubbock, TX | FSN | L 15–31 | 51,717 | |
| December 29 | 7:00 p.m. | vs. No. 24 Ohio State* | | Alamodome; San Antonio, TX (Alamo Bowl) | ESPN | L 7–33 | 65,265 | |
*Non-conference game; ^{†}Homecoming; Rankings from AP Poll released prior to the game; All times are in Central time
