= Army Black Knights football statistical leaders =

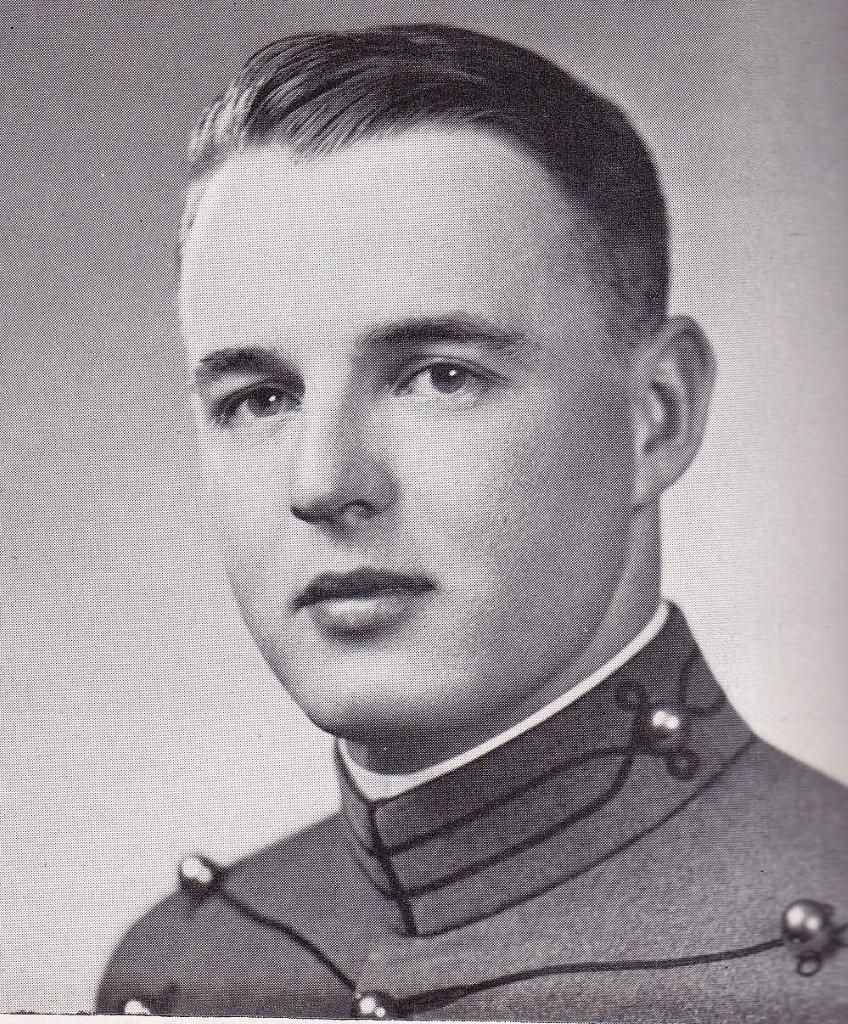
Heisman Trophy winner and three-time All-American Glenn Davis not only appears on Army's all-time rushing lists, but also threw for 12 touchdowns, caught 6 touchdowns, and holds Army's career record with 14 interceptions.

The Army Black Knights football statistical leaders are individual statistical leaders of the Army Black Knights football program in various categories, including passing, rushing, receiving, total offense, defensive stats, and kicking. Within those areas, the lists identify single-game, single-season, and career leaders. Since the 2024 season, the Black Knights have represented the United States Military Academy (often informally known as "West Point") as a single-sport member of the NCAA Division I FBS American Conference (American).

Although Army began competing in intercollegiate football in 1890, the school's official record book considers the "modern era" to have begun in 1944. Records from before this year are often incomplete and inconsistent, and they are generally not included in these lists.

These lists are dominated by more recent players for several reasons:

- Since 1944, seasons have increased from 10 games to 11 and then 12 games in length.
- The NCAA didn't allow freshmen to play varsity football until 1972 (with the exception of the World War II years), allowing players to have four-year careers.
- Bowl games only began counting toward single-season and career statistics in 2002. The Black Knights have played in seven bowl games since then, allowing the players to accumulate statistics for an extra game in those seasons.
- The American has held a conference championship game since 2015, giving Army the potential for an extra game should it qualify in a given season. It played in this game in its first American Conference season in 2024.

However, values on these lists are often smaller than the values seen on other programs' lists for several reasons:

- Like the other service academies (with the Air Force and Naval Academies also playing FBS football), West Point is a four-year undergraduate program that did not typically redshirt players before the practice was effectively outlawed in 2026. This means that for a player to play for four years, he must be good enough to see the field as a true freshman. Relatively few players are prepared to do this, which depresses career records.
- In the modern era, the Black Knights have traditionally run an option offense that emphasizes running, including by the quarterbacks. However, Army ran a pro-style offense in the 1970s and the early 2000s, and passing and receiving records tend to belong to players from those eras.

These lists are updated through Week 8 of the 2026 season. Players active for Army in 2026 are in bold.

== Passing ==
=== Passing yards ===
Career
Rank	Player	Yards	Years
1	Zac Dahman	6,904	2002 2003 2004 2005
2	Leamon Hall	5,502	1974 1975 1976 1977
3	Kingsley Fink	3,079	1971 1972 1973
4	Pete Vann	2,937	1951 1952 1953 1954
5	Steve Lindell	2,921	1966 1967 1968
6	Carson Williams	2,738	2006 2007 2008 2009
7	Trent Steelman	2,723	2009 2010 2011 2012
8	Jerryl Bennett	2,490	1978 1979 1980 1981
9	Chad Jenkins	2,458	1999 2000 2001
10	Joe Caldwell	2,440	1958 1959

Single season
Rank	Player	Yards	Year
1	Zac Dahman	2,234	2003
2	Leamon Hall	2,174	1976
3	Leamon Hall	1,944	1977
4	Zac Dahman	1,864	2005
5	Chad Jenkins	1,773	2001
6	Carson Williams	1,770	2007
7	Zac Dahman	1,767	2004
8	Earle Mulrane	1,419	1978
9	Joe Caldwell	1,343	1959
10	Kingsley Fink	1,141	1973

Single game
Rank	Player	Yards	Year	Opponent
1	Leamon Hall	385	1976	North Carolina
2	Zac Dahman	353	2002	Houston
3	Zac Dahman	338	2003	Hawaii
4	Carson Williams	328	2007	Tulsa
5	Kingsley Fink	326	1973	Tennessee
6	Leamon Hall	310	1977	Massachusetts
7	Zac Dahman	308	2003	Tulane
8	Joe Gerena	305	2000	Houston
9	Leamon Hall	298	1976	Penn State
10	Joe Caldwell	297	1959	Oklahoma

=== Passing touchdowns ===
Career
Rank	Player	TDs	Years
1	Leamon Hall	38	1974 1975 1976 1977
2	Zac Dahman	36	2002 2003 2004 2005
3	Pete Vann	25	1951 1952 1953 1954
4	Arnold Galiffa	21	1946 1947 1948 1949
5	Kingsley Fink	18	1971 1972 1973
6	Joe Caldwell	17	1958 1959
	Carson Williams	17	2006 2007 2008 2009
8	Bryson Daily	16	2022 2023 2024
9	Steve Lindell	15	1966 1967 1968
10	Trent Steelman	14	2009 2010 2011 2012

Single season
Rank	Player	TDs	Year
1	Leamon Hall	15	1976
	Leamon Hall	15	1977
3	Pete Vann	11	1954
	Zac Dahman	11	2003
	Zac Dahman	11	2005
	Carson Williams	11	2007
7	Arnold Tucker	9	1946
	Joe Caldwell	9	1959
	Zac Dahman	9	2004
	Bryson Daily	9	2024

Single game
Rank	Player	TDs	Year	Opponent
1	Leamon Hall	5	1977	Massachusetts
2	Arnold Galiffa	4	1949	Columbia
	Arnold Galiffa	4	1949	Fordham
	Joe Caldwell	4	1959	Boston College
	Leamon Hall	4	1976	North Carolina
	Zac Dahman	4	2002	Houston

== Rushing ==
=== Rushing yards ===
Career
Rank	Player	Yards	Years
1	Mike Mayweather	4,299	1987 1988 1989 1990
2	Carlton Jones	3,536	2002 2003 2004 2005
3	Trent Steelman	3,320	2009 2010 2011 2012
4	Larry Dixon	3,214	2011 2012 2013 2014
5	Ahmad Bradshaw	3,038	2015 2016 2017
6	Glenn Davis	2,959	1943 1944 1945 1946
7	Raymond Maples	2,878	2010 2011 2012 2013 2014
8	Bryson Daily	2,723	2022 2023 2024
9	Gerald Walker	2,700	1979 1980 1981 1982
10	Darnell Woolfolk	2,368	2015 2016 2017 2018

Single season
Rank	Player	Yards	Year
1	Ahmad Bradshaw	1,746	2017
2	Bryson Daily	1,659	2024
3	Collin Mooney	1,339	2008
4	Mike Mayweather	1,338	1990
5	Carlton Jones	1,269	2004
6	Trent Steelman	1,248	2012
7	**Cale Hellums**	1,223	2025
8	Raymond Maples	1,215	2012
9	Mike Mayweather	1,177	1989
10	Michael Wallace	1,157	2000

Single game
Rank	Player	Yards	Year	Opponent
1	Terry Baggett	304	2013	Eastern Michigan
2	Michael Wallace	269	1999	Louisville
3	Ahmad Bradshaw	265	2017	Air Force
4	Charlie Jarvis	253	1968	Boston College
5	Ahmad Bradshaw	244	2017	North Texas
6	Christian Anderson	236	2021	Miami (OH)
7	Akili King	235	1993	Colgate
8	Collin Mooney	229	2008	Eastern Michigan
9	Mike Mayweather	227	1990	VMI
10	Carlton Jones	225	2004	South Florida

=== Rushing touchdowns ===
Career
Rank	Player	TDs	Years
1	Trent Steelman	45	2009 2010 2011 2012
2	Glenn Davis	43	1943 1944 1945 1946
3	Bryson Daily	41	2022 2023 2024
4	Mike Mayweather	37	1987 1988 1989 1990
4	Darnell Woolfolk	37	2015 2016 2017 2018
4	**Cale Hellums**	37	2024 2025 2026
7	Tory Crawford	35	1984 1985 1986 1987
8	Carlton Jones	33	2002 2003 2004 2005
9	Ahmad Bradshaw	27	2015 2016 2017
9	Jakobi Buchanan	27	2019 2020 2021 2022 2023

Single season
Rank	Player	TDs	Year
1	Bryson Daily	32	2024
2	**Cale Hellums**	19	2026
3	**Cale Hellums**	18	2025
4	Carlton Jones	17	2004
4	Trent Steelman	17	2012
4	Kelvin Hopkins Jr.	17	2018
7	Glenn Davis	15	1945
7	Tory Crawford	15	1986
10	Glenn Davis	14	1944
10	Ahmad Bradshaw	14	2017
10	Darnell Woolfolk	14	2017
10	Darnell Woolfolk	14	2018

Single game
Rank	Player	TDs	Year	Opponent
1	Carlton Jones	5	2004	South Florida
	Kelvin Hopkins Jr.	5	2018	Houston (Armed Forces Bowl)
	Bryson Daily	5	2024	East Carolina
	**Cale Hellums**	5	2026	Florida Atlantic
5	Gil Stephenson	4	1949	Harvard
	Lynn Moore	4	1968	Duke
	Tory Crawford	4	1986	Yale
	Tory Crawford	4	1986	Lafayette
	Calvin Cass	4	1989	Colgate
	Willie McMillian	4	1991	Colgate
	Rick Roper	4	1992	Lafayette
	Willie McMillian	4	1990	Vanderbilt
	Michael Wallace	4	1999	Louisville
	CJ Young	4	2001	Tulane
	Collin Mooney	4	2008	Tulane
	Trent Steelman	4	2010	Temple
	Terry Baggett	4	2013	Eastern Michigan
	AJ Schurr	4	2013	Hawaii
	Bryson Daily	4	2024	UAB
	Bryson Daily	4	2024	Tulane (American Championship Game)

== Receiving ==
=== Receptions ===
Career
Rank	Player	Rec	Years
1	Jeremy Trimble	176	2004 2005 2006 2007
2	Clennie Brundidge	147	1975 1976 1977 1978
3	Aaron Alexander	127	2002 2003 2004
4	Mike Fahnestock	97	1977 1978 1979 1980
5	Terry Young	95	1965 1966 1967
6	Carlton Jones	93	2002 2003 2004 2005
7	Joe Albano	91	1968 1969 1970
8	Walter Hill	87	2003 2004 2005 2006
9	Clint Dodson	80	1999 2000 2001
10	Jim Ward	76	1971 1972 1973

Single season
Rank	Player	Rec	Year
1	Aaron Alexander	64	2003
2	Jeremy Trimble	62	2007
3	Joe Albano	54	1970
4	Jeremy Trimble	52	2006
5	Clennie Brundidge	51	1977
6	Clennie Brundidge	47	1976
	Mike Fahnestock	47	1980
8	Clennie Brundidge	44	1978
9	Bill Carpenter	43	1959
10	Clint Dodson	42	2001
	Jeremy Trimble	42	2005

Single game
Rank	Player	Rec	Year	Opponent
1	Joe Albano	13	1970	Syracuse
2	Aaron Alexander	12	2003	Tulane
3	Jim Merriken	11	1977	Notre Dame
	Jeremy Trimble	11	2007	Central Michigan
	Jeremy Trimble	11	2007	Tulsa
6	Joe Albano	10	1970	Baylor
	Joe Albano	10	1970	Penn State
	Clennie Brundidge	10	1976	Lafayette
	Jim Merriken	10	1977	Boston College
	Mike Fahnestock	10	1980	Holy Cross

=== Receiving yards ===
Career
Rank	Player	Yards	Years
1	Jeremy Trimble	2,330	2004 2005 2006 2007
2	Clennie Brundidge	2,279	1975 1976 1977 1978
3	Aaron Alexander	1,820	2002 2003 2004
4	Mike Fahnestock	1,726	1977 1978 1979 1980
5	Terry Young	1,239	1965 1966 1967
6	Joe Albano	1,230	1968 1969 1970
7	Gary Steele	1,111	1966 1967 1968
8	Bill Carpenter	1,044	1958 1959 1960
9	Isaiah Alston	1,031	2020 2021 2022 2023
10	Noah Short	1,008	2023 2024 2025

Single season
Rank	Player	Yards	Year
1	Mike Fahnestock	937	1980
2	Jeremy Trimble	912	2007
3	Aaron Alexander	861	2003
4	Clennie Brundidge	842	1977
5	Clennie Brundidge	726	1978
6	Joe Albano	669	1970
7	Clennie Brundidge	657	1976
8	Bill Carpenter	591	1959
9	Terry Young	539	1966
10	Jeremy Trimble	535	2005

Single game
Rank	Player	Yards	Year	Opponent
1	Mike Fahnestock	186	1980	Lehigh
2	Jeremy Trimble	169	2007	Central Michigan
3	Clennie Brundidge	167	1977	Pittsburgh
	Jeremy Trimble	167	2007	Tulsa
5	Joe Albano	166	1970	Syracuse
6	Barry Armstrong	164	1973	Tennessee
7	Scott Spellmon	157	1983	Lehigh
8	Gary Steele	156	1968	Penn State
9	William White	150	2003	Houston
10	Mike Fahnestock	149	1980	Holy Cross

=== Receiving touchdowns ===
Career
Rank	Player	TDs	Years
1	Jeremy Trimble	15	2004 2005 2006 2007
2	Glenn Davis	14	1943 1944 1945 1946
	Clennie Brundidge	14	1975 1976 1977 1978
4	Mike Fahnestock	13	1977 1978 1979 1980
5	Aaron Alexander	12	2002 2003 2004
6	Dan Foldberg	11	1948 1949 1950
7	Don Holleder	9	1953 1954 1955 1956
	Pete Dawkins	9	1956 1957 1958
	Aris Comeaux	9	2000 2001 2002
10	Joe Albano	8	1968 1969 1970
	Ron Leshinski	8	1993 1994 1995 1996
	Edgar Poe	8	2013 2014 2015

Single season
Rank	Player	TDs	Year
1	Mike Fahnestock	7	1980
	Jeremy Trimble	7	2007
3	Glenn Davis	6	1946
	James Cain	6	1949
	Pete Dawkins	6	1958
	Joe Albano	6	1970
	Clennie Brundidge	6	1976
	Aaron Alexander	6	2003
	Edgar Poe	6	2015
10	Dan Foldberg	5	1949
	Dan Foldberg	5	1950
	Don Holleder	5	1954
	Myreon Williams	5	1990
	Aris Comeaux	5	2001
	Alejandro Villanueva	5	2009

Single game
Rank	Player	TDs	Year	Opponent
1	Jim Cain	3	1949	Fordham
	Dick Stephenson	3	1956	Colgate
	Mike Fahnestock	3	1977	Mass
	Myreon Williams	3	1990	Lafayette

== Total offense ==
Total offense is the sum of passing and rushing statistics. It does not include receiving or returns.

=== Total offense yards ===
Career
Rank	Player	Yards	Years
1	Zac Dahman	6,498	2002 2003 2004 2005
2	Trent Steelman	6,043	2009 2010 2011 2012
3	Leamon Hall	5,524	1974 1975 1976 1977
4	Bryson Daily	4,643	2022 2023 2024
5	Ahmad Bradshaw	4,458	2015 2016 2017
6	Mike Mayweather	4,299	1987 1988 1989 1990
7	Glenn Davis	4,131	1943 1944 1945
8	Ronnie McAda	4,036	1994 1995 1996
9	Tory Crawford	3,949	1984 1985 1986
10	Steve Lindell	3,672	1966 1967 1968

Single season
Rank	Player	Yards	Year
1	Bryson Daily	2,666	2024
2	Kelvin Hopkins Jr.	2,143	2018
3	Leamon Hall	2,121	1976
4	Zac Dahman	2,054	2003
5	Ahmad Bradshaw	2,031	2017
6	Chad Jenkins	1,949	2001
7	Leamon Hall	1,923	1977
8	**Cale Hellums**	1,917	2025
9	Trent Steelman	1,915	2012
10	Tory Crawford	1,894	1986

Single game
Rank	Player	Yards	Year	Opponent
1	Leamon Hall	378	1976	North Carolina
2	Bryson Daily	337	2024	UTSA
3	Tory Crawford	331	1986	Lafayette
4	Zac Dahman	331	2002	Houston
5	Leamon Hall	330	1977	Massachusetts
6	Johnny Goff	326	1998	Tulane
7	Carson Williams	324	2007	Tulsa
8	Zac Dahman	321	2003	Hawaii
9	Bryson Daily	318	2024	East Carolina
10	Chad Jenkins	316	2001	East Carolina

=== Touchdowns responsible for ===
"Touchdowns responsible for" is the NCAA's official term for combined passing and rushing touchdowns.

Career
Rank	Player	TDs	Years
1	Trent Steelman	59	2009 2010 2011 2012
2	Bryson Daily	57	2022 2023 2024
3	Glenn Davis	55	1943 1944 1945
4	Leamon Hall	51	1974 1975 1976 1977
5	**Cale Hellums**	44	2024 2025 2026
6	Tory Crawford	43	1984 1985 1986
7	Mike Mayweather	37	1987 1988 1989 1990
7	Zac Dahman	37	2002 2003 2004 2005
7	Ahmad Bradshaw	37	2015 2016 2017
10	Carlton Jones	33	2002 2003 2004 2005

Single season
Rank	Player	TDs	Year
1	Bryson Daily	41	2024
2	Leamon Hall	23	1977
2	Kelvin Hopkins Jr.	23	2018
4	**Cale Hellums**	22	2025
4	**Cale Hellums**	22	2026
6	Glenn Davis	18	1945
6	Trent Steelman	18	2010
6	Trent Steelman	18	2012
9	Arnold Galiffa	17	1949
9	Leamon Hall	17	1976
9	Tory Crawford	17	1986
9	Carlton Jones	17	2004

== Defense ==
=== Interceptions ===
Career
Rank	Player	Ints	Years
1	Glenn Davis	14	1943 1944 1945 1946
2	Donovan Travis	11	2007 2008 2009 2010
3	Doug Pavek	10	1983 1984 1985
	Mike McElrath	10	1989 1990 1991 1992
5	Jim Bevans	9	1996 1997
	John Brenner	9	1968 1969
	Randy Stein	9	1969 1970 1971
	Matt Wotell	9	1970 1971 1972 1973
	Mike Williams	9	1980 1981 1982
	Ed Givens	9	1988 1989 1990

Single season
Rank	Player	Ints	Year
1	Arnold Tucker	8	1946
	Jim Bevans	8	1967
	Jim McCall	8	1968
4	John Brenner	7	1969
	Doug Pavek	7	1985
6	Harold Shultz	6	1949
	Herbert Johnson	6	1950
	Ed Givens	6	1989

=== Tackles ===
Career
Rank	Player	Tackles	Years
1	Mike McElrath	436	1989 1990 1991 1992
2	Jim Gentile	376	1981 1982 1983 1984
3	John Hilliard	366	1976 1977 1978 1979
4	Kevin Czarnecki	352	1991 1992 1993
5	Greg Washington	334	2001 2002 2003 2004
6	Mike Williams	333	1980 1981 1982
7	Brian Zickefoose	327	1999 2000 2001
8	Ryan Kent	325	2001 2002 2003
9	Caleb Campbell	307	2004 2005 2006 2007
10	Jason Frazier	306	1999 2000 2001 2002

Single season
Rank	Player	Tackles	Year
1	Dave Duncavage	165	1974
2	Troy Lingley	161	1988
3	Mike McElrath	157	1992
4	Mike Williams	156	1982
5	Ryan Kent	146	2003
6	Mark Berry	140	1976
7	Kevin Czarnecki	131	1992
8	John Hilliard	129	1977
9	Brian Zickefoose	128	2000
10	Nate Hunterton	123	1999
	John Hilliard	123	1978

=== Sacks ===
Career
Rank	Player	Sacks	Years
1	Josh McNary	28.0	2007 2008 2009 2010
2	Andre Carter II	19.5	2020 2021 2022
3	James Nachtigal	16.0	2016 2017 2018
4	Alex Aukerman	14.5	2014 2015 2016 2017
5	Cameron Craig	13.5	2003 2004 2005 2006
	Andrew King	13.5	2013 2014 2015 2016
7	Clarence Holmes	11.5	1999 2000 2001 2002
	John Voit	11.5	2014 2015 2016 2017
9	Arik Smith	10.0	2018 2019 2020 2021
10	Will Sullivan	9.5	2001 2002 2003 2004

Single season
Rank	Player	Sacks	Year
1	Andre Carter II	15.5	2021
2	Josh McNary	12.5	2009
3	Josh McNary	10.0	2010
4	James Nachtigal	8.5	2018
5	Alex Aukerman	7.5	2016
6	Jim Slomka	7.0	1993
	Zac Hurst	7.0	1999
	Clarence Holmes	7.0	2001
	Alex Aukerman	7.0	2016
10	Elo Modozie	6.5	2024

Single game
Rank	Player	Sacks	Year	Opponent
1	Josh McNary	4.0	2009	Temple

== Kicking ==
=== Field goals made ===
Career
Rank	Player	FGs	Years
1	Craig Stopa	48	1982 1983 1984 1985
2	Alex Carlton	36	2008 2009 2010 2011
3	Adren Jensen	35	1968 1969 1970
4	Daniel Grochowski	31	2012 2013 2014 2015
5	Patmon Malcom	28	1990 1991 1992
6	Keith Walker	27	1985 1986 1987 1988
	Joseph Parker	27	1995 1996
8	Eric Olsen	25	1995 1996 1997 1998
	Quinn Maretzki	25	2020 2021 2022 2023
10	Dave Aucoin	24	1979 1980 1981

Single season
Rank	Player	FGs	Year
1	Joseph Parker	18	1996
	Alex Carlton	18	2009
3	Craig Stopa	15	1984
	Keith Walker	15	1988
	Alex Carlton	15	2010
	Dawson Jones	15	2025
7	Arden Jensen	14	1970
8	Eric Olsen	13	1998
9	Craig Stopa	12	1982
	Craig Stopa	12	1983
	Patmon Malcom	12	1990
	Quinn Maretzki	12	2023

Single game
Rank	Player	FGs	Year	Opponent
1	Craig Stopa	5	1984	Air Force

=== Field goal percentage ===
Career
Rank	Player	FG%	Years
1	Keith Walker	84.4%	1985 1986 1987 1988
2	Trey Gronotte	83.3%	2022 2023 2024
3	Quinn Maretzki	80.6%	2020 2021 2022 2023
4	Keith Havenstrite	80.0%	1989
	Kurt Heiss	80.0%	1993 1994
6	Joseph Parker	79.4%	1995 1996
7	Eric Olsen	78.1%	1995 1996 1997 1998
8	Anthony Zurisko	75.0%	2003
	Dawson Jones	75.0%	2025
10	Derek Jacobs	72.7%	2001
	Austin Miller	72.7%	2004 2005 2006

Single season
Rank	Player	FG%	Year
1	Craig Stopa	88.2%	1984
2	Patmon Malcom	85.7%	1990
	Joseph Parker	85.7%	1996
	Quinn Maretzki	85.7%	2023
5	Keith Walker	83.3%	1987
	Keith Walker	83.3%	1988
	Trey Gronotte	83.3%	2024
8	Mike Castelli	80.0%	1976
	Keith Havenstrite	80.0%	1989
	Kurt Heiss	80.0%	1994
	Eric Olsen	80.0%	1997
	Quinn Maretzki	80.0%	2022
