= List of Army Black Knights in the NFL draft =

This is a list of Army Black Knights football players in the NFL draft.

== Key ==
B	Back	K	Kicker	NT	Nose tackle
C	Center	LB	Linebacker	FB	Fullback
DB	Defensive back	P	Punter	HB	Halfback
DE	Defensive end	QB	Quarterback	WR	Wide receiver
DT	Defensive tackle	RB	Running back	G	Guard
E	End	T	Offensive tackle	TE	Tight end

== Selections ==
Year	Round	Pick	Player	Team	Position
1946	1	3	Doc Blanchard	Pittsburgh Steelers	B
1947	1	2	Glenn Davis	Detroit Lions	RB
1947	1	7	Tex Coulter	Chicago Cardinals	T
1947	5	28	Hank Foldberg	Washington Redskins	E
1947	10	85	Arnold Tucker	Chicago Bears	B
1947	14	124	Herschel Fuson	New York Giants	B
1947	29	269	Dick Pitzer	Pittsburgh Steelers	E
1950	18	225	Arnold Galiffa	Green Bay Packers	QB
1951	21	251	Al Pollard	New York Yanks	B
1951	22	261	Dan Foldberg	Detroit Lions	E
1952	23	270	Vic Pollock	Pittsburgh Steelers	B
1954	23	276	Bob Mischak	Cleveland Browns	E
1955	14	166	Tommy Bell	Philadelphia Eagles	B
1955	22	261	Pete Vann	San Francisco 49ers	QB
1956	8	93	Don Holleder	New York Giants	E
1956	14	166	Pat Uebel	Washington Redskins	B
1956	15	177	Ron Melnik	New York Giants	T
1958	14	161	Bill Melnik	Chicago Bears	T
1959	24	288	Bob Novogratz	Baltimore Colts	G
1960	9	103	Bob Hall	Baltimore Colts	T
1960	9	108	Bob Anderson	New York Giants	B
1960	19	226	Bill Carpenter	Baltimore Colts	E
1969	15	382	Charlie Jarvis	San Diego Chargers	RB
1969	19	424	Gary Steele	Detroit Lions	TE
1997	7	240	Ronnie McAda	Green Bay Packers	QB
2008	7	218	Caleb Campbell	Detroit Lions	DB
