= List of Army Black Knights head football coaches =

List of head football coaches for the Army Black Knights

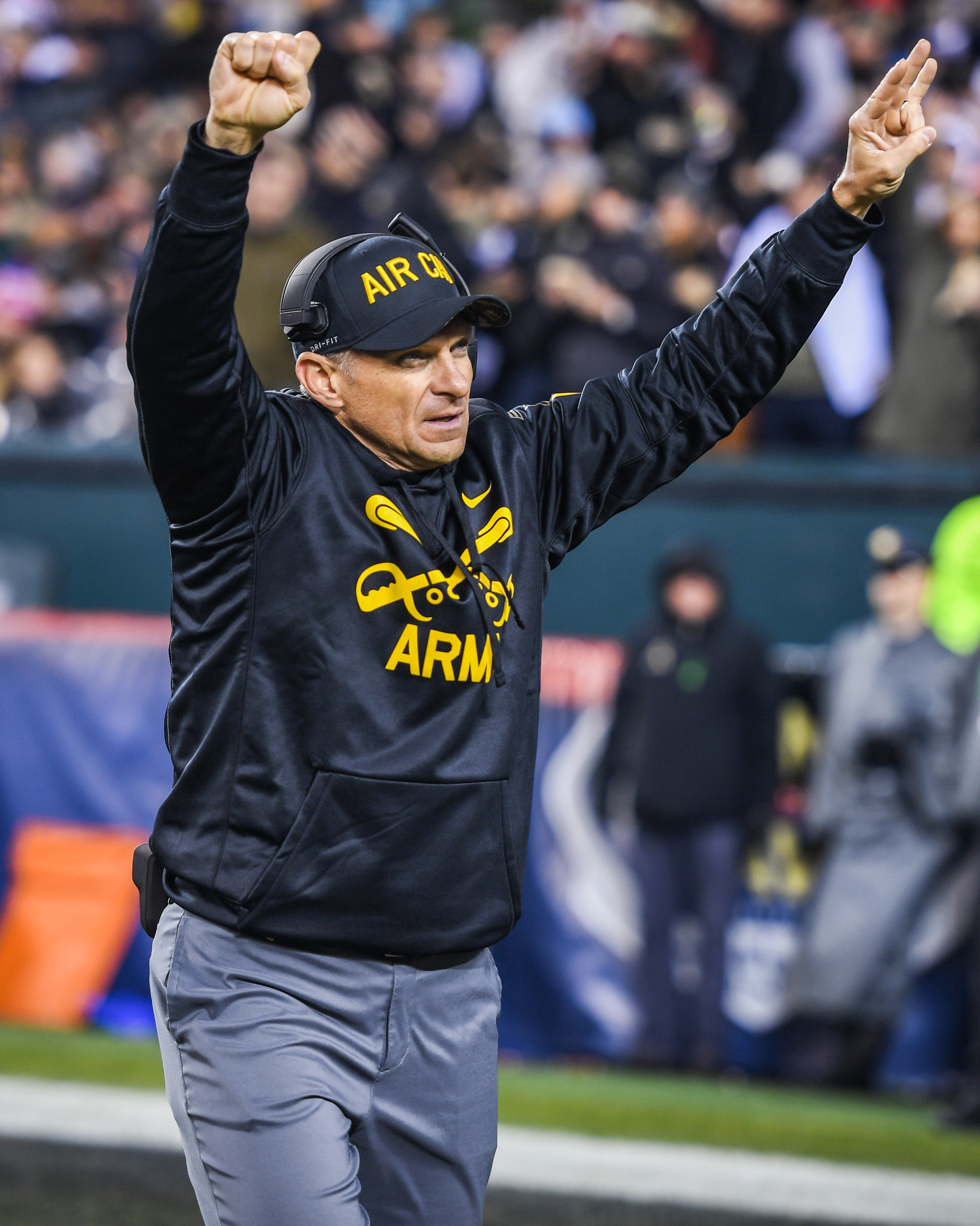
Jeff Monken has served as head coach at Army since 2014 season.

The Army Black Knights college football team represents the United States Military Academy (Army) in the American Athletic Conference (AAC), as part of the NCAA Division I Football Bowl Subdivision. The program has had 36 head coaches and one interim head coach since it began play during the 1890 season. Since December 2013, Jeff Monken has served as head coach at Army.

Four coaches have led Army in postseason bowl games: Jim Young, Bob Sutton, Rich Ellerson, and Monken. Although only Monken has led the Black Knights to a conference championship, Charles Dudley Daly won two (1914 and 1916) and Earl Blaik won three (1944, 1945, 1946) national championships.

Blaik is the leader in seasons coached, with 18 years as head coach and in games coached (164) and won (121). Geoffrey Keyes has the highest winning percentage of those who have coached more than one game at .875. John Mumford has the lowest winning percentage of those who have coached more than one game, with .000. Of the 36 different head coaches who have led the Black Knights, Henry L. Williams, Daly, John McEwan, Biff Jones, Blaik, and Young have been inducted into the College Football Hall of Fame.

== Key ==
Key to symbols in coaches list
General		Overall		Conference		Postseason (Note: Although the first Rose Bowl Game was played in 1902, it has been continuously played since the 1916 game, and is recognized as the oldest bowl game by the NCAA. "—" indicates any season prior to 1916 when postseason games were not played.)	
No.	Order of coaches (Note: A running total of the number of head coaches, with coaches who served separate tenures being counted only once. Interim head coaches are represented with "Int" and are not counted in the running total. "—" indicates the team played but either without a coach or no coach is on record. "X" indicates an interim year without play.)	GC	Games coached	CW	Conference wins	PW	Postseason wins
DC	Division championships	OW	Overall wins	CL	Conference losses	PL	Postseason losses
CC	Conference championships	OL	Overall losses	CT	Conference ties	PT	Postseason ties
NC	National championships	OT	Overall ties (Note: Overtime rules in college football were introduced in 1996, making ties impossible in the period since.)	C%	Conference winning percentage		
†	Elected to the College Football Hall of Fame	O%	Overall winning percentage (Note: When computing the win–loss percentage, a tie counts as half a win and half a loss.)				

== Coaches ==
List of head football coaches showing season(s) coached, overall records, conference records, postseason records, championships and selected awards (Note: Statistics correct as of the end of the 2025 NCAA Division I FBS football season.)
No.	Name	Season(s)	GC	OW	OL	OT	O%	CW	CL	CT	C%	PW	PL	PT	DC	CC	NC	Awards
1	Dennis Michie	1890; 1892	6	3	2	1	0.583	–	–	–	–	–	–	–	–	–	0	–
2	Henry L. Williams^{†}	1891	7	5	1	1	0.786	–	–	–	–	–	–	–	–	–	0	–
3	Laurie Bliss	1893	9	4	5	0	0.444	–	–	–	–	–	–	–	–	–	0	–
4	Harmon S. Graves	1894–1895	14	10	4	0	0.714	–	–	–	–	–	–	–	–	–	0	–
5	George P. Dyer	1896	6	3	2	1	0.583	–	–	–	–	–	–	–	–	–	0	–
6	Herman Koehler	1897–1900	33	19	11	3	0.621	–	–	–	–	–	–	–	–	–	0	–
7	Leon Kromer	1901	8	5	1	2	0.750	–	–	–	–	–	–	–	–	–	0	–
8	Dennis E. Nolan	1902	8	6	1	1	0.813	–	–	–	–	–	–	–	–	–	0	–
9	Edward Leonard King	1903	9	6	2	1	0.722	–	–	–	–	–	–	–	–	–	0	–
10	Robert Boyers	1904–1905	18	11	6	1	0.639	–	–	–	–	–	–	–	–	–	0	–
11	Ernest Graves Sr.	1906; 1912	16	7	8	1	0.469	–	–	–	–	–	–	–	–	–	0	–
12	Henry Smither (Note: Smither was relieved from duty following a 12–0 victory over Tufts in the season opener. Ernest Graves Sr. served as head coach for the remaining eight games of the season, and led Army to a record of 2–5–1.)	1906–1907	10	7	2	1	0.750	–	–	–	–	–	–	–	–	–	0	–
13	Harry Nelly	1908–1910	22	15	5	2	0.727	–	–	–	–	–	–	–	–	–	0	–
14	Joseph Beacham	1911	8	6	1	1	0.813	–	–	–	–	–	–	–	–	–	0	–
15	Charles Dudley Daly^{†}	1913–1916; 1919–1922	69	58	13	3	0.804	–	–	–	–	–	–	–	–	–	2 – 1914; 1916	–
16	Geoffrey Keyes	1917	8	7	1	0	0.875	–	–	–	–	–	–	–	–	–	0	–
17	Hugh Mitchell	1918	1	1	0	0	1.000	–	–	–	–	–	–	–	–	–	0	–
18	John McEwan^{†}	1923–1925	26	18	5	3	0.750	–	–	–	–	–	–	–	–	–	0	–
19	Biff Jones^{†}	1926–1929	40	30	8	2	0.775	–	–	–	–	–	–	–	–	–	0	–
20	Ralph Sasse	1930–1932	32	25	5	2	0.813	–	–	–	–	–	–	–	–	–	0	–
21	Garrison H. Davidson	1933–1937	47	35	11	1	0.755	–	–	–	–	–	–	–	–	–	0	–
22	William H. Wood	1938–1940	28	12	13	3	0.482	–	–	–	–	–	–	–	–	–	0	–
23	Earl Blaik^{†}	1941–1958	164	121	33	10	0.768	–	–	–	–	–	–	–	–	–	3 – 1944; 1945; 1946	–
24	Dale Hall	1959–1961	29	16	11	2	0.586	–	–	–	–	–	–	–	–	–	0	–
25	Paul Dietzel	1962–1965	40	21	18	1	0.538	–	–	–	–	–	–	–	–	–	0	–
26	Tom Cahill	1966–1973	81	40	39	2	0.506	–	–	–	–	–	–	–	–	–	0	AFCA Coach of the Year (1966); FWAA Coach of the Year (1966)
27	Homer Smith	1974–1978	55	21	33	1	0.391	–	–	–	–	–	–	–	–	–	0	–
28	Lou Saban	1979	11	2	8	1	0.227	–	–	–	–	–	–	–	–	–	0	–
29	Ed Cavanaugh	1980–1982	33	10	21	2	0.333	–	–	–	–	–	–	–	–	–	0	–
30	Jim Young^{†}	1983–1990	91	51	39	1	0.566	–	–	–	–	2	1	0	–	–	0	–
31	Bob Sutton	1991–1999	100	44	55	1	0.445	3	9	0	0.250	0	1	0	–	0	0	–
32	Todd Berry	2000–2003	40	5	35	–	0.125	4	22	–	0.154	0	0	–	–	0	0	–
Int	John Mumford (Note: Berry was fired after the first six games of the 2003 season. John Mumford served as interim head coach for the remaining seven games of the season. Army finished the year with an overall record of 0–13 and a mark of 0–8 in conference play.)	2003	7	0	7	–	.000	0	4	–	.000	0	0	–	–	0	0	–
33	Bobby Ross	2004–2006	34	9	25	–	0.265	2	6	–	0.250	0	0	–	–	0	0	–
34	Stan Brock	2007–2008	24	6	18	–	0.250	–	–	–	–	0	0	–	–	–	0	–
35	Rich Ellerson	2009–2013	61	20	41	–	0.328	–	–	–	–	1	0	–	–	–	0	–
36	Jeff Monken	2014–present	152	89	63	–	0.586	12	5	–	0.706	6	1	–	–	1	0	–
