= 2007 Army Black Knights football team =

American college football season

2007 Army Black Knights football
- Conference: Independent
- Record: 3–9
- Head coach: Stan Brock (1st season)
- Offensive coordinator: Tim Walsh (1st season)
- Offensive scheme: Pro-style
- Defensive coordinator: John Mumford (4th season)
- Base defense: 4–3
- Captains: Caleb Campbell; Tony Fusco; Jeremy Trimble; Mike Viti
- Home stadium: Michie Stadium

2007 NCAA Division I FBS independents football records
	Conf.			Overall
Team	W		L	W		L
Navy		–		8	–	5
Army		–		3	–	9
Notre Dame		–		3	–	9
Rankings from AP Poll

The 2007 Army Black Knights football team represented the United States Military Academy as an independent in the 2007 NCAA Division I FBS football season. The Black Knights, led by first-year head coach Stan Brock, played their home games at the Michie Stadium.

== Schedule ==
Date	Time	Opponent	Site	TV	Result	Attendance
September 1	7:00 p.m.	vs. Akron	Cleveland Browns Stadium; Cleveland, OH	ESPN Plus	L 14–22	17,865
September 8	1:00 p.m.	Rhode Island	Michie Stadium; West Point, NY	ESPN Classic	W 14–7 ^{OT}	27,601
September 15	3:30 p.m.	at Wake Forest	BB&T Field; Winston-Salem, NC	ACC Select	L 10–21	32,142
September 22	1:00 p.m.	at No. 14 Boston College	Alumni Stadium; Chestnut Hill, MA	ESPN Classic	L 17–37	40,329
September 29	12:00 p.m.	Temple	Michie Stadium; West Point, NY	ESPNU	W 37–21	34,176
October 6	8:00 p.m.	Tulane	Michie Stadium; West Point, NY	ESPNU	W 20–17 ^{OT}	30,022
October 13	3:30 p.m.	at Central Michigan	Kelly/Shorts Stadium; Mount Pleasant, MI	Comcast Sports	L 23–47	21,013
October 20	12:00 p.m.	at Georgia Tech	Bobby Dodd Stadium; Atlanta, GA	Raycom Sports	L 10–34	50,242
November 3	3:30 p.m.	at Air Force	Falcon Stadium; Colorado Springs, CO	CSTV	L 10–30	46,144
November 9	8:00 p.m.	Rutgers	Michie Stadium; West Point, NY	ESPN2	L 6–41	39,073
November 17	12:00 p.m.	Tulsa	Michie Stadium; West Point, NY	ESPN Classic	L 39–49	27,687
December 1	12:00 p.m.	vs. Navy	M&T Bank Stadium; Baltimore, MD (Army–Navy Game)	CBS	L 3–38	71,610
Rankings from AP Poll released prior to the game; All times are in Eastern time

== Game summaries ==
=== Tulane ===
Tulane Green Wave (1–3) at Army Black Knights (2–3)

Quarter	1	2	3	4	OT	Total
Tulane	0	10	7	0	0	17
Army	0	7	0	10	3	20

at Michie Stadium, West Point, New York

- Date: October 6, 2007
- Game time: 8:00 p.m. EDT
- Game attendance: 30,022
- TV: ESPNU
- Box Score, Box Score

"The Michie Miracle"

Team	Category	Player	Statistics
Tulane	Passing	Anthony Scelfo	16/25, 154 Yds
Tulane	Rushing	Matt Forte	32 Rush, 202 Yds, 2 TD
Tulane	Receiving	Jeremy Williams	4 Rec, 52 Yds
Army	Passing	Carson Williams	15/21, 113 Yds, TD
Army	Rushing	Patrick Mealy	15 Rush, 41 Yds
Army	Receiving	Mike Wright	2 Rec, 63 Yds, TD

Scoring summary

Quarter	Time	Drive			Team	Scoring information	Score	
Quarter	Time	Plays	Yards	TOP	Team	Scoring information	TUL	ARMY
2	11:28	12	80	4:58	Tulane	Matt Forte 2-yard touchdown run, Ross Thevenot kick good	7	0
2	6:39	10	60	4:40	Army	Jeremy Trimble 27-yard touchdown reception from Carson Williams, Adam Demarco kick good	7	7
2	0:19	9	40	1:41	Tulane	46-yard field goal by Ross Thevenot	10	7
3	7:48	8	90	3:50	Tulane	Matt Forte 33-yard touchdown run, Ross Thevenot kick good	17	7
4	1:40				Army	36-yard field goal by Owen Tolson	17	10
4	0:00	5	80	0:29	Army	Mike Wright 36-yard touchdown reception from Kevin Dunn, Adam Demarco kick good	17	17
OT		5	17		Army	25-yard field goal by Owen Tolson	17	20
"TOP" = time of possession. For other American football terms, see Glossary of American football.							17	20

== Roster ==
2007 Army Black Knights football team roster
Players
Coaches
Offense

Pos.	#	Name	Class
QB		Kevin Dunn
		Patrick Mealy
		Jeremy Trimble
QB		Carson Williams
		Mike Wright

Defense

Pos.	#	Name	Class
LB		Josh McNary	Fr

Special teams

Pos.	#	Name	Class
K		Adam Demarco
K		Owen Tolson

Head coach

- Stan Brock

Coordinators/assistant coaches

- Tim Walsh – Offensive coordinator
- John Mumford – Defensive coordinator
- Tony Coaxum – Linebackers/cornerbacks

Legend

- (C) Team captain
- (S) Suspended
- (I) Ineligible
- Injured
- Redshirt
