= 2004 Memphis Tigers football team =

American college football season

2004 Memphis Tigers football

GMAC Bowl, L 35–52 vs. Bowling Green
- Conference: Conference USA
- Record: 8–4 (5–3 C-USA)
- Head coach: Tommy West (4th season)
- Offensive coordinator: Randy Fichtner (4th season)
- Offensive scheme: Pro-style
- Defensive coordinator: Joe Lee Dunn (4th season)
- Base defense: 3–3–5
- Home stadium: Liberty Bowl Memorial Stadium

2004 Conference USA football standings
| | Conf. | | | Overall |
| Team | W | | L | W | | L |
|---|---|---|---|---|---|---|
| No. 6 Louisville $ | 8 | – | 0 | 11 | – | 1 |
| Memphis | 5 | – | 3 | 8 | – | 4 |
| Southern Miss | 5 | – | 3 | 7 | – | 5 |
| Cincinnati | 5 | – | 3 | 7 | – | 5 |
| UAB | 5 | – | 3 | 7 | – | 5 |
| TCU | 3 | – | 5 | 5 | – | 6 |
| Tulane | 3 | – | 5 | 5 | – | 6 |
| South Florida | 3 | – | 5 | 4 | – | 7 |
| Houston | 3 | – | 5 | 3 | – | 8 |
| East Carolina | 2 | – | 6 | 2 | – | 9 |
| Army | 2 | – | 6 | 2 | – | 9 |
$ – Conference champion; Rankings from AP Poll

The 2004 Memphis Tigers football team represented the University of Memphis in the 2004 NCAA Division I-A football season. Memphis competed as a member of the Conference USA. The team was led by head coach Tommy West. The Tigers played their home games at the Liberty Bowl Memorial Stadium.

== Schedule ==
| Date | Time | Opponent | Rank | Site | TV | Result | Attendance | Source |
|---|---|---|---|---|---|---|---|---|
| September 4 | 6:00 pm | at Ole Miss* | | Vaught–Hemingway Stadium; Oxford, MS (rivalry) | | W 20–13 | 61,112 | |
| September 11 | 7:00 pm | Chattanooga* | | Liberty Bowl Memorial Stadium; Memphis, TN | | W 52–21 | 38,133 | |
| September 18 | 6:00 pm | at Arkansas State* | No. 25 | Indian Stadium; Jonesboro, AR (Paint Bucket Bowl) | | W 47–35 | 30,427 | |
| September 25 | 6:00 pm | at UAB | | Legion Field; Birmingham, AL (Battle for the Bones) | ESPNGP | L 28–35 | 26,212 | |
| October 2 | 1:00 pm | Houston^{†} | | Liberty Bowl Memorial Stadium; Memphis, TN | | W 41–14 | 35,297 | |
| October 16 | 1:00 pm | Tulane | | Liberty Bowl Memorial Stadium; Memphis, TN | | W 49–24 | 32,897 | |
| October 23 | 6:00 pm | at Cincinnati | | Nippert Stadium; Cincinnati, OH (rivalry) | ESPNGP | L 10–49 | 15,092 | |
| November 4 | 6:30 pm | No. 14 Louisville | | Liberty Bowl Memorial Stadium; Memphis, TN (rivalry) | ESPN | L 49–56 | 52,384 | |
| November 12 | 7:00 pm | Southern Miss | | Liberty Bowl Memorial Stadium; Memphis, TN (Black and Blue Bowl) | ESPN2 | W 30–26 | 47,163 | |
| November 20 | 1:00 pm | at East Carolina | | Dowdy–Ficklen Stadium; Greenville, NC | | W 38–35 | 27,250 | |
| November 27 | 10:00 am | at South Florida | | Raymond James Stadium; Tampa, FL | ESPN2 | W 31–15 | 21,392 | |
| December 22 | 7:00 pm | vs. Bowling Green* | | Ladd–Peebles Stadium; Mobile, AL (GMAC Bowl) | ESPN | L 35–52 | 29,500 | |
*Non-conference game; ^{†}Homecoming; Rankings from AP Poll released prior to the game; All times are in Central time
