= Leamon Hall =

American football player (born 1957)

No. 16
- Position: Quarterback

Personal information
- Born: November 8, 1955 (age 70); Apopka, Florida, U.S.
- Listed height: 6 ft 5 in (1.96 m)
- Listed weight: 217 lb (98 kg)

Career information
- High school: Apopka (Orange County, Florida)
- College: Army (1974–1977)

Awards and highlights
- 2× First-team All-East (1976, 1977); Army Athletic Hall of Fame; Army All time passing leader in a single game, season and career

Leamon Hall (born November 8, 1955) is a former American football quarterback who is the all-time single game, season and career passing leader for the Army Black Knights. He has been described as one of the greatest passers in the history of Army football.

== Biography ==
Hall was born in Apopka, Florida near Orlando. He was cited as looking like a boy down the block and being wholesome looking. His father was a linotype operator. He was an all-state highschool player in 1972 at Apopka High School and he was named Mr. Apopka Memorial High School for 1972–73. Rumors circulated that a bounty was put on him due to his skill. He wanted to attend either Auburn University or the University of Florida. He suffered a right-shoulder separation in his next to last game of senior year which hurt his recruitment chances. Hall did well in the physical aptitude test at Army, to the point that Homer Smith thought it was exaggerated. Hall had concerns about joining Army, and was told he would not make it there. Hall later stated that he joined Army due to not receiving any other offers.

Hall made his debut for Army on November 2, 1974, in a loss against Vanderbilt. He scored the team's only offensive touchdown of the game and was cited as a possible quarterback for Army going forward. He helped Army defeat Air Force, 17–16 in his second game, where he faced an unusual six-man pass defense. Hall became the starter for the team's 4th game of the season, when senior quarterback Scott Gillogy broke his collarbone. The offense was adjusted to Hall's needs for his second season with the team with the team adding Clennie Brundidge, who would become one of his favorite targets. Army went 3–8 in his first season, 2–9 in his second season, 5–6 in his junior season, and 7–4 in his senior season, where he was made captain. As a junior, he ranked in the Top 10 nationally in throwing and total offense.

In his senior year, he started the season by throwing five touchdown passes against UMass. This not only set the single game touchdown record for Army but also helped him set the career touchdown pass record at Army. These passes also helped contribute to his school record for 3,558 passing yards. Hall would later break two additional records at Army and broke 18 passing and total offense records. He was described as a one-man football team. His records were partially cited as occurring due to an increase in the use of the forward pass. He was said to be a candidate for the All-American team and the Heisman Trophy for the 1977–78 season. He finished his college career with 5,502 yards and 426 completions.

He was later scouted for professional play. Gil Brandt, the director of player development for the Dallas Cowboys marked him as above average in all quarterback categories. Tom Braatz, head scout of the Atlanta Falcons noted him as one of the top five senior quarterbacks in college football. Hall was not sure if he wanted to join the U.S. Army or if he would like to play football, since he could not do both. Hall described it as, "wanting two women at the same time". Hall's coach, Homer Smith did not think he would get to play professional football. He was selected for the 1978 East–West Shrine Bowl and the 1978 Hula Bowl.

His pro football agent was Greg Marotta. In 1983, he played for the Fort Benning Doughboys football team and competed in the Dallas Cowboys training camp. He was signed by the United States Football League's Arizona Wranglers in February 1983, but was released before the 1983 season started. He was afterwards signed by the New Jersey Generals, but was soon after waived.

He was named to the Army Sports Hall of Fame on September 17, 2021.

== Personal life ==
Hall's son, Taylor Hall, is a tight end's coach at Thiel College.

== Honors ==
- Army Black Knights football

All time passing leader in a single game, season and career
Hall of Fame member

- 1978 East-West Shrine Bowl

Selected

- 1978 Hula Bowl

Selected

== See also ==
- Army Black Knights football statistical leaders
