= 2004 Army Black Knights football team =

American college football season

2004 Army Black Knights football
- Conference: Conference USA
- Record: 2–9 (2–6 C-USA)
- Head coach: Bobby Ross (1st season)
- Offensive coordinator: Kevin Ross (1st season)
- Offensive scheme: Pro-style
- Defensive coordinator: John Mumford (1st season)
- Base defense: 4–3
- Captains: Aaron Alexander; Curt Daniels; Joel Glover; Greg Washington
- Home stadium: Michie Stadium

2004 Conference USA football standings
	Conf.			Overall
Team	W		L	W		L
No. 6 Louisville $	8	–	0	11	–	1
Memphis	5	–	3	8	–	4
Southern Miss	5	–	3	7	–	5
Cincinnati	5	–	3	7	–	5
UAB	5	–	3	7	–	5
TCU	3	–	5	5	–	6
Tulane	3	–	5	5	–	6
South Florida	3	–	5	4	–	7
Houston	3	–	5	3	–	8
East Carolina	2	–	6	2	–	9
Army	2	–	6	2	–	9
$ – Conference champion; Rankings from AP Poll

The 2004 Army Black Knights football team represented the United States Military Academy as a member of Conference USA (C-USA) during the 2004 NCAA Division I-A football season.

== Schedule ==
Date	Time	Opponent	Site	TV	Result	Attendance	Source
September 11	1:00 p.m.	Louisville	Michie Stadium; West Point, NY	WDRB	L 21–52	28,130	
September 18	8:00 p.m.	at Houston	Robertson Stadium; Houston, TX		L 21–35	18,687	
September 25	12:00 p.m.	at Connecticut*	Rentschler Field; East Hartford, CT		L 3–40	40,000	
October 2	1:00 p.m.	TCU	Michie Stadium; West Point, NY		L 17–21	32,707	
October 9	1:00 p.m.	Cincinnati	Michie Stadium; West Point, NY		W 48–29	31,144	
October 16	7:00 p.m.	at South Florida	Raymond James Stadium; Tampa, FL	ESPN Plus	W 42–35	36,549	
October 30	3:00 p.m.	at East Carolina	Dowdy–Ficklen Stadium; Greenville, NC	ESPN Plus	L 28–38	29,111	
November 6	1:00 p.m.	Air Force*	Michie Stadium; West Point, NY (Commander-in-Chief's Trophy)	ESPN Plus	L 22–31	40,129	
November 13	7:00 p.m.	at Tulane	Louisiana Superdome; New Orleans, LA		L 31–45	20,357	
November 20	1:00 p.m.	UAB	Michie Stadium; West Point, NY		L 14–20	27,706	
December 4		vs. Navy*	Lincoln Financial Field; Philadelphia, PA (Army–Navy Game)	CBS	L 13–42		
*Non-conference game
