= 2004 Southern Miss Golden Eagles football team =

American college football season

2004 Southern Miss Golden Eagles football

New Orleans Bowl champion

New Orleans Bowl, W 31–10 vs. North Texas
- Conference: Conference USA
- Record: 7–5 (5–3 C-USA)
- Head coach: Jeff Bower (15th season)
- Offensive coordinator: Rip Scherer (2nd season)
- Offensive scheme: Pro-style
- Defensive coordinator: Tyrone Nix (4th season)
- Base defense: 3–4
- Home stadium: M. M. Roberts Stadium

2004 Conference USA football standings
	Conf.			Overall
Team	W		L	W		L
No. 6 Louisville $	8	–	0	11	–	1
Memphis	5	–	3	8	–	4
Southern Miss	5	–	3	7	–	5
Cincinnati	5	–	3	7	–	5
UAB	5	–	3	7	–	5
TCU	3	–	5	5	–	6
Tulane	3	–	5	5	–	6
South Florida	3	–	5	4	–	7
Houston	3	–	5	3	–	8
East Carolina	2	–	6	2	–	9
Army	2	–	6	2	–	9
$ – Conference champion; Rankings from AP Poll

The 2004 Southern Miss Golden Eagles football team represented the University of Southern Mississippi in the 2004 NCAA Division I-A football season. The Golden Eagles were led by head coach Jeff Bower and played their home games at M. M. Roberts Stadium. They were a member of Conference USA.

== Schedule ==
Date	Time	Opponent	Rank	Site	TV	Result	Attendance	Source
September 11	11:00 am	at Nebraska*		Memorial Stadium; Lincoln, NE	ABC	W 21–17	77,877	
September 25	7:00 pm	at Tulane		Louisiana Superdome; New Orleans, LA		W 32–14	27,211	
October 2	6:00 pm	at South Florida		Raymond James Stadium; Tampa, FL	ESPNGP	W 32–20	30,049	
October 7	6:00 pm	Houston		M. M. Roberts Stadium; Hattiesburg, MS	ESPN2	W 35–29 ^{OT}	28,625	
October 16	2:30 pm	at Alabama*	No. 24	Bryant–Denny Stadium; Tuscaloosa, AL	PPV	L 3–27	82,094	
October 23	6:00 pm	East Carolina^{†}		M. M. Roberts Stadium; Hattiesburg, MS	ESPNGP	W 51–10	32,422	
November 6	2:00 pm	Cincinnati	No. 21	M. M. Roberts Stadium; Hattiesburg, MS		L 24–52	30,690	
November 12	7:00 pm	at Memphis		Liberty Bowl Memorial Stadium; Memphis, TN (Black and Blue Bowl)	ESPN2	L 26–30	47,163	
November 20	2:05 pm	at TCU		Amon G. Carter Stadium; Fort Worth, TX		L 17–42	27,992	
November 27	2:00 pm	UAB		M. M. Roberts Stadium; Hattiesburg, MS		W 26–21	25,604	
December 4	6:30 pm	No. 4 California*		M. M. Roberts Stadium; Hattiesburg, MS	ESPN	L 16–26	27,480	
December 14	6:30 pm	vs. North Texas*		Louisiana Superdome; New Orleans, LA (New Orleans Bowl)	ESPN	W 31–10	27,253	
*Non-conference game; ^{†}Homecoming; Rankings from AP Poll released prior to the game; All times are in Central time
