= 2002 Houston Cougars football team =

American college football season

2002 Houston Cougars football
- Conference: Conference USA
- Record: 5–7 (3–5 C-USA)
- Head coach: Dana Dimel (3rd season)
- Co-offensive coordinators: Dave Warner (2nd season); Clancy Barone (2nd season)
- Offensive scheme: Spread
- Co-defensive coordinators: Dick Bumpas (4th season); Bradley Dale Peveto (2nd season)
- Base defense: 4–3
- Captains: Ronnie Braxton; Rex Hadnot; Bryan Hill; Hanik Milligan; Joffrey Reynolds; Chris Robertson; Jesse Sowells
- Home stadium: Robertson Stadium

2002 Conference USA football standings
| | Conf. | | | Overall |
| Team | W | | L | W | | L |
|---|---|---|---|---|---|---|
| Cincinnati + | 6 | – | 2 | 7 | – | 7 |
| No. 23 TCU + | 6 | – | 2 | 10 | – | 2 |
| Louisville | 5 | – | 3 | 7 | – | 6 |
| Southern Miss | 5 | – | 3 | 7 | – | 6 |
| Tulane | 4 | – | 4 | 8 | – | 5 |
| UAB | 4 | – | 4 | 5 | – | 7 |
| East Carolina | 4 | – | 4 | 4 | – | 8 |
| Houston | 3 | – | 5 | 5 | – | 7 |
| Memphis | 2 | – | 6 | 3 | – | 9 |
| Army | 1 | – | 7 | 1 | – | 11 |
+ – Conference co-champions; Rankings from AP Poll

The 2002 Houston Cougars football team represented the University of Houston as a member of Conference USA (C-USA) during the 2002 NCAA Division I-A football season. Led by Dana Dimel in his third and final season as head coach, the Cougars compiled an overall record of 5–7 with a mark of 3–5 in conference play, placing eighth in C-USA. The team played home games on campus, at Robertson Stadium in Houston.

Dimel was fired after the season.

== Schedule ==
| Date | Time | Opponent | Site | TV | Result | Attendance | Source |
|---|---|---|---|---|---|---|---|
| August 31 | 7:00 pm | at Rice* | Rice Stadium; Houston, TX (rivalry) | | W 24–10 | 30,747 | |
| September 7 | 7:00 pm | Tulane | Robertson Stadium; Houston, TX | | L 13–34 | 16,307 | |
| September 14 | 7:00 pm | Louisiana–Lafayette* | Robertson Stadium; Houston, TX | | W 36–17 | 19,569 | |
| September 21 | 7:00 pm | at No. 3 Texas* | Darrell K Royal–Texas Memorial Stadium; Austin, TX | PPV | L 11–41 | 82,936 | |
| October 5 | 2:00 pm | at TCU | Amon G. Carter Stadium; Fort Worth, TX | | L 17–34 | 24,088 | |
| October 12 | 2:00 pm | at UAB | Legion Field; Birmingham, AL | | L 34–51 | 13,897 | |
| October 19 | 2:00 pm | Army | Robertson Stadium; Houston, TX | | W 56–42 | 16,469 | |
| November 2 | 1:00 pm | at Memphis | Liberty Bowl Memorial Stadium; Memphis, TN | | W 26–21 | 20,532 | |
| November 9 | 2:00 pm | East Carolina^{†} | Robertson Stadium; Houston, TX | | L 48–54 ^{3OT} | 13,669 | |
| November 16 | 12:00 pm | at Cincinnati | Nippert Stadium; Cincinnati, OH | | L 14–47 | 14,023 | |
| November 23 | 2:00 pm | South Florida* | Robertson Stadium; Houston, TX | FSN | L 14–32 | 12,856 | |
| November 30 | 2:00 pm | Louisville | Robertson Stadium; Houston, TX | | W 27–10 | 11,048 | |
*Non-conference game; ^{†}Homecoming; Rankings from AP Poll released prior to the game; All times are in Central time

== Roster ==
2002 Houston Cougars football team roster
Players
Coaches
Offense

| Pos. | # | Name | Class |
|---|---|---|---|
| WR | 18 | Harrison Arceneaux | Jr |
| QB | 12 | Blade Bassler | Fr |
| RB | 27 | Jackie Battle | Fr |
| WR | 3 | Keykowa Bell | Sr |
| QB | 16 | Torrence Botts | Sr |
| WR | 16 | Josh Carethers | Fr |
| WR | 16 | Jon Clark | Jr |
| QB | 16 | Nick Eddy | So |
| OL | 76 | Rex Hadnot | Jr |
| QB | 9 | Barrick Nealy | Fr |
| RB | 1 | Joffrey Reynolds | Sr |

Defense

| Pos. | # | Name | Class |
|---|---|---|---|
| S | 5 | Hanik Milligan | Sr |
| CB | 8 | Stanford Routt | So |
| LB | 47 | Ji Yun | So |

Special teams

| Pos. | # | Name | Class |
|---|---|---|---|
| K | 7 | Dustin Bell | Fr |

Head coach

- Dana Dimel

Coordinators/assistant coaches

Legend

- (C) Team captain
- (S) Suspended
- (I) Ineligible
- Injured
- Redshirt

Roster
Last update: 2002-10-17

== Team players in the NFL ==
| Player | Position | Round | Pick | NFL club |
|---|---|---|---|---|
| Hanik Milligan | Safety | 6 | 188 | San Diego Chargers |

The following finished their college career in 2002, were not drafted, but played in the NFL.

| Player | Position | First NFL team |
|---|---|---|
| Joffrey Reynolds | Running back | St. Louis Rams |
