= 2006 Army Black Knights football team =

American college football season

2006 Army Black Knights football
- Conference: Independent
- Record: 3–9
- Head coach: Bobby Ross (3rd season)
- Offensive coordinator: Kevin Ross (3rd season)
- Offensive scheme: Pro-style
- Defensive coordinator: John Mumford (3rd season)
- Base defense: 4–3
- Captains: Pete Bier; Cameron Craig; Walter Hill; Barrett Scruggs
- Home stadium: Michie Stadium

2006 NCAA Division I FBS independents football records
	Conf.			Overall
Team	W		L	W		L
No. 17 Notre Dame %		–		10	–	3
Navy		–		9	–	4
Army		–		3	–	9
Temple		–		1	–	11
% – BCS at-large representative; Rankings from AP Poll

The 2006 Army Black Knights football team represented the United States Military Academy as an independent during the 2006 NCAA Division I FBS football season.

Had the Knights been bowl-eligible, they would have been invited to the Poinsettia Bowl, but after a 3–3 start, they lost their last six games to finish 3–9.

== Schedule ==
Date	Time	Opponent	Site	TV	Result	Attendance
September 2	7:00 p.m.	at Arkansas State	Indian Stadium; Jonesboro, AR		L 6–14	23,426
September 9	1:00 p.m.	Kent State	Michie Stadium; West Point, NY	ESPN Classic	W 17–14	25,123
September 16	9:15 p.m.	vs. Texas A&M	Alamodome; San Antonio, TX	ESPN2	L 24–28	64,583
September 23	7:00 p.m.	at Baylor	Floyd Casey Stadium; Waco, TX		W 27–20 ^{OT}	36,218
September 30	3:30 p.m.	Rice	Michie Stadium; West Point, NY	ESPNU	L 14–48	31,597
October 7	1:00 p.m.	VMI	Michie Stadium; West Point, NY	ESPN Classic	W 62–7	31,069
October 14	12:00 p.m.	at Connecticut	Rentschler Field; East Hartford, CT	ESPN+	L 7–21	38,834
October 21	3:30 p.m.	TCU	Michie Stadium; West Point, NY	ESPNU	L 17–31	33,614
October 28	2:00 p.m.	at Tulane	Louisiana Superdome; New Orleans, LA		L 28–42	21,053
November 3	8:00 p.m.	Air Force	Michie Stadium; West Point, NY	ESPN2	L 7–43	32,066
November 18	2:30 p.m.	at No. 6 Notre Dame	Notre Dame Stadium; Notre Dame, IN (rivalry)	NBC	L 9–41	80,795
December 2	2:30 p.m.	vs. Navy	Lincoln Financial Field; Philadelphia, PA (Army–Navy Game)	CBS	L 14–26	69,943
Rankings from AP Poll released prior to the game; All times are in Eastern time
