= 2004 UAB Blazers football team =

American college football season

2004 UAB Blazers football

Hawaii Bowl, L 40–59 vs. Hawaii
- Conference: Conference USA
- Record: 7–5 (5–3 C-USA)
- Head coach: Watson Brown (10th season)
- Offensive coordinator: Pat Sullivan (6th season)
- Offensive scheme: Multiple
- Defensive coordinator: Wayne Bolt (2nd season)
- Base defense: 4–3
- Home stadium: Legion Field

2004 Conference USA football standings
	Conf.			Overall
Team	W		L	W		L
No. 6 Louisville $	8	–	0	11	–	1
Memphis	5	–	3	8	–	4
Southern Miss	5	–	3	7	–	5
Cincinnati	5	–	3	7	–	5
UAB	5	–	3	7	–	5
TCU	3	–	5	5	–	6
Tulane	3	–	5	5	–	6
South Florida	3	–	5	4	–	7
Houston	3	–	5	3	–	8
East Carolina	2	–	6	2	–	9
Army	2	–	6	2	–	9
$ – Conference champion; Rankings from AP Poll

The 2004 UAB Blazers football team represented the University of Alabama at Birmingham (UAB) as a member of the Conference USA (C-USA) during the 2004 NCAA Division I-A football season. Led by tenth-year head coach Watson Brown, the Blazers compiled an overall record of 7–5 with a mark of 5–3 in conference play, placing in a four-way tie for second in C-USA. UAB was invited to the program's first bowl game, the Hawaii Bowl, where the Blazers lost to Hawaii. The team played home games at Legion Field in Birmingham, Alabama.

== Schedule ==
Date	Time	Opponent	Site	TV	Result	Attendance	Source
September 4	6:00 p.m.	Baylor*	Legion Field; Birmingham, AL		W 56–14	21,080	
September 18	5:30 p.m.	at No. 8 Florida State*	Doak Campbell Stadium; Tallahassee, FL	ESPN2	L 7–34	81,825	
September 25	6:00 p.m.	Memphis	Legion Field; Birmingham, AL (Battle for the Bones)	ESPNGP	W 35–28	27,192	
October 2	6:00 p.m.	at Cincinnati	Nippert Stadium; Cincinnati, OH		W 30–27	21,053	
October 9	1:30 p.m.	at Mississippi State*	Davis Wade Stadium; Starkville, MS		W 27–13	32,310	
October 15	7:00 p.m.	TCU	Legion Field; Birmingham, AL	ESPN	W 41–25	33,280	
October 23	2:30 p.m.	at Tulane	Tad Gormley Stadium; New Orleans, LA		L 55–59	22,541	
November 3	6:30 p.m.	South Florida	Legion Field; Birmingham, AL	ESPN2	L 20–45	9,220	
November 13	3:00 p.m.	Houston^{†}	Legion Field; Birmingham, AL		W 20–7	13,240	
November 20	12:00 p.m.	at Army	Michie Stadium; West Point, NY		W 20–14	27,706	
November 27	2:00 p.m.	at Southern Miss	M. M. Roberts Stadium; Hattiesburg, MS		L 21–26	25,604	
December 24	6:00 p.m.	vs. Hawaii*	Aloha Stadium; Halawa, HI (Hawaii Bowl)	ESPN	L 40–59	39,754	
*Non-conference game; ^{†}Homecoming; Rankings from Coaches' Poll released prior to the game; All times are in Central time
