= 2002 UAB Blazers football team =

American college football season

2002 UAB Blazers football
- Conference: Conference USA
- Record: 5–7 (4–4 C-USA)
- Head coach: Watson Brown (8th season)
- Offensive coordinator: Pat Sullivan (4th season)
- Offensive scheme: Multiple
- Defensive coordinator: John Neal (1st season)
- Base defense: 4–3
- Home stadium: Legion Field

2002 Conference USA football standings
	Conf.			Overall
Team	W		L	W		L
Cincinnati +	6	–	2	7	–	7
No. 23 TCU +	6	–	2	10	–	2
Louisville	5	–	3	7	–	6
Southern Miss	5	–	3	7	–	6
Tulane	4	–	4	8	–	5
UAB	4	–	4	5	–	7
East Carolina	4	–	4	4	–	8
Houston	3	–	5	5	–	7
Memphis	2	–	6	3	–	9
Army	1	–	7	1	–	11
+ – Conference co-champions; Rankings from AP Poll

The 2002 UAB Blazers football team represented the University of Alabama at Birmingham (UAB) as a member of the Conference USA (C-USA) during the 2002 NCAA Division I-A football season. Led by eighth-year head coach Watson Brown, the Blazers compiled an overall record of 5–7 with a mark of 4–4 in conference play, placing in a three-way tie for fifth in C-USA. UAB played home games at Legion Field in Birmingham, Alabama.

== Schedule ==
Date	Time	Opponent	Site	TV	Result	Attendance	Source
August 31	6:00 p.m.	at No. 6 Florida*	Ben Hill Griffin Stadium; Gainesville, FL	PPV	L 3–51	85,575	
September 7	6:00 p.m.	Troy State*	Legion Field; Birmingham, AL		W 27–26	22,203	
September 14	6:00 p.m.	Pittsburgh*	Legion Field; Birmingham, AL		L 20–26	15,027	
September 21	6:00 p.m.	at Louisiana–Lafayette*	Cajun Field; Lafayette, LA		L 0–34	19,616	
September 28	6:00 p.m.	Memphis	Legion Field; Birmingham, AL (Battle for the Bones)		W 31–17	14,179	
October 12	2:00 p.m.	Houston^{†}	Legion Field; Birmingham, AL		W 51–34	13,897	
October 19	2:30 p.m.	at Tulane	Louisiana Superdome; New Orleans, LA		L 14–35	19,343	
October 26	12:00 p.m.	at Army	Michie Stadium; West Point, NY		W 29–26	35,804	
November 9	2:00 p.m.	Southern Miss	Legion Field; Birmingham, AL	CSS	L 13–20	19,698	
November 16	2:00 p.m.	East Carolina	Legion Field; Birmingham, AL		W 36–29	13,678	
November 23	12:00 p.m.	at Louisville	Papa John's Cardinal Stadium; Louisville, KY		L 21–41	35,261	
November 30	2:00 p.m.	at Cincinnati	Nippert Stadium; Cincinnati, OH		L 23–31	9,606	
*Non-conference game; ^{†}Homecoming; Rankings from AP Poll released prior to the game; All times are in Central time

== Roster ==
2002 UAB Blazers football team roster
Players
Coaches
Offense

Pos.	#	Name	Class
QB	4	Darrell Hackney	Fr
WR	5	Willie Quinnie	Sr
WR	7	Kenny Borders	Sr
WR	9	T. J. Simmons	Sr
WR	10	Roddy White	So
QB	13	Matt Johnson	Fr
QB	14	Thomas Cox	Sr

Defense

Pos.	#	Name	Class
DE	96	Hassan McKeithan	Sr
DT	97	Marvin Nickson	Sr
DE	98	James Malone	Sr

Special teams

Pos.	#	Name	Class

Head coach

- Watson Brown

Coordinators/assistant coaches

Legend

- (C) Team captain
- (S) Suspended
- (I) Ineligible
- Injured
- Redshirt

Roster
Last update: 2002-11-07
