= 2002 East Carolina Pirates football team =

American college football season

2002 East Carolina Pirates football
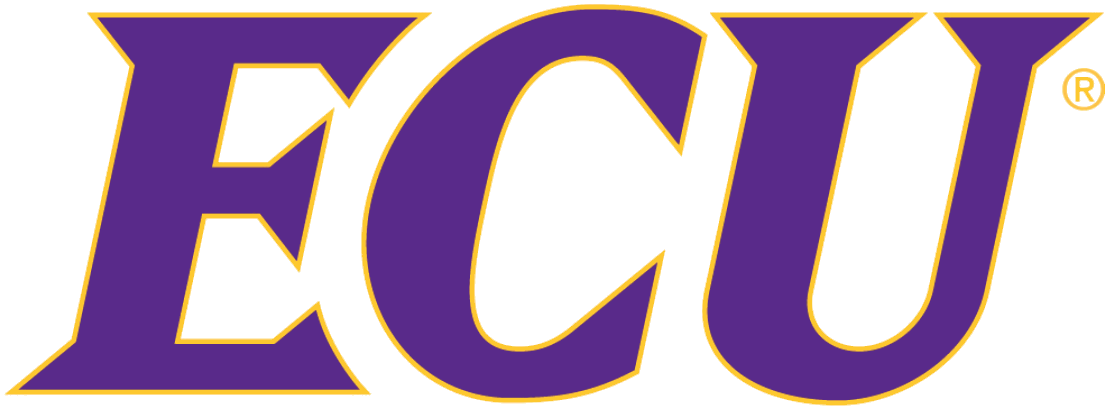
- Conference: Conference USA
- Record: 4–8 (4–5 C-USA)
- Head coach: Steve Logan (11th season)
- Offensive coordinator: Doug Martin (7th season)
- Offensive scheme: Spread
- Defensive coordinator: Tim Rose (4th season)
- Base defense: 4–3
- Home stadium: Dowdy–Ficklen Stadium

2002 Conference USA football standings
| | Conf. | | | Overall |
| Team | W | | L | W | | L |
|---|---|---|---|---|---|---|
| Cincinnati + | 6 | – | 2 | 7 | – | 7 |
| No. 23 TCU + | 6 | – | 2 | 10 | – | 2 |
| Louisville | 5 | – | 3 | 7 | – | 6 |
| Southern Miss | 5 | – | 3 | 7 | – | 6 |
| Tulane | 4 | – | 4 | 8 | – | 5 |
| UAB | 4 | – | 4 | 5 | – | 7 |
| East Carolina | 4 | – | 4 | 4 | – | 8 |
| Houston | 3 | – | 5 | 5 | – | 7 |
| Memphis | 2 | – | 6 | 3 | – | 9 |
| Army | 1 | – | 7 | 1 | – | 11 |
+ – Conference co-champions; Rankings from AP Poll

The 2002 East Carolina Pirates football team was an American football team that represented East Carolina University as a member of Conference USA during the 2002 NCAA Division I-A football season. In their eleventh season under head coach Steve Logan, the team compiled a 4–8 record (4–5 in Conference USA).

== Schedule ==
| Date | Time | Opponent | Site | TV | Result | Attendance | Source |
|---|---|---|---|---|---|---|---|
| August 31 | 6:00 pm | at Duke* | Wallace Wade Stadium; Durham, NC | | L 16–23 | 23,276 | |
| September 7 | 6:30 pm | at Wake Forest | Groves Stadium; Winston-Salem, NC | | L 22–27 | 28,486 | |
| September 14 | 7:00 pm | Tulane | Dowdy–Ficklen Stadium; Greenville, NC | | W 24–20 | 35,300 | |
| September 28 | 12:00 pm | at West Virginia* | Mountaineer Field; Morgantown, WV | ESPN+ | L 17–37 | 54,497 | |
| October 5 | 2:00 pm | Army | Dowdy–Ficklen Stadium; Greenville, NC | | W 59–24 | 38,111 | |
| October 19 | 2:00 pm | South Florida^{†} | Dowdy–Ficklen Stadium; Greenville, NC | FSN | L 30–46 | 33,419 | |
| October 26 | 2:00 pm | at Louisville | Papa John's Cardinal Stadium; Louisville, KY | WITN | L 20–44 | 32,428 | |
| November 9 | 7:00 pm | at Houston | Robertson Stadium; Houston, TX | ESPN+ | W 54–48 ^{3OT} | 13,669 | |
| November 16 | 3:00 pm | at UAB | Legion Field; Birmingham, AL | | L 29–36 | 13,687 | |
| November 23 | 2:00 pm | No. 22 TCU | Dowdy–Ficklen Stadium; Greenville, NC | | W 31–28 | 23,189 | |
| November 30 | 3:00 pm | at Southern Miss | M. M. Roberts Stadium; Hattiesburg, MS | | L 7–24 | 19,888 | |
| December 6 | 2:00 pm | Cincinnati | Dowdy–Ficklen Stadium; Greenville, NC | | L 26–42 | 18,125 | |
*Non-conference game; ^{†}Homecoming; Rankings from AP Poll released prior to the game; All times are in Eastern time
