= 2004 East Carolina Pirates football team =

American college football season

2004 East Carolina Pirates football
- Conference: Conference USA
- Record: 2–9 (2–6 C-USA)
- Head coach: John Thompson (2nd season)
- Offensive coordinator: Noah Brindise (1st season)
- Offensive scheme: Pro-style
- Defensive coordinator: Jerry Odom (2nd season)
- Base defense: 4–3
- Home stadium: Dowdy–Ficklen Stadium

2004 Conference USA football standings
	Conf.			Overall
Team	W		L	W		L
No. 6 Louisville $	8	–	0	11	–	1
Memphis	5	–	3	8	–	4
Southern Miss	5	–	3	7	–	5
Cincinnati	5	–	3	7	–	5
UAB	5	–	3	7	–	5
TCU	3	–	5	5	–	6
Tulane	3	–	5	5	–	6
South Florida	3	–	5	4	–	7
Houston	3	–	5	3	–	8
East Carolina	2	–	6	2	–	9
Army	2	–	6	2	–	9
$ – Conference champion; Rankings from AP Poll

The 2004 East Carolina Pirates football team was an American football team that represented East Carolina University as a member of Conference USA during the 2004 NCAA Division I-A football season. In their second season under head coach John Thompson, the team compiled a 2–9 record.

== Schedule ==
Date	Time	Opponent	Site	TV	Result	Attendance	Source
September 4	6:00 pm	at No. 10 West Virginia*	Milan Puskar Stadium; Morgantown, WV		L 23–56	59,172	
September 11	7:00 pm	Wake Forest*	Dowdy–Ficklen Stadium; Greenville, NC		L 17–31	33,458	
September 25	7:00 pm	Cincinnati	Dowdy–Ficklen Stadium; Greenville, NC		L 19–24	29,332	
October 2	3:30 pm	at No. 22 Louisville	Papa John's Cardinal Stadium; Louisville, KY	ESPN+	L 7–59	40,220	
October 9	2:00 pm	Tulane^{†}	Dowdy–Ficklen Stadium; Greenville, NC	ESPN+	W 27–25	29,584	
October 23	7:05 pm	at Southern Miss	M. M. Roberts Stadium; Hattiesburg, MS	ESPNGP	L 10–51	32,422	
October 30	3:00 pm	Army	Dowdy–Ficklen Stadium; Greenville, NC	ESPN+	W 38–28	29,111	
November 6	5:00 pm	at Houston	Robertson Stadium; Houston, TX		L 24–34	13,069	
November 13	7:00 pm	at South Florida	Raymond James Stadium; Tampa, FL		L 17–41	25,408	
November 20	2:00 pm	Memphis	Dowdy–Ficklen Stadium; Greenville, NC		L 35–38	27,250	
November 27	1:00 pm	vs. NC State*	Bank of America Stadium; Charlotte, NC (rivalry)		L 14–52	41,244	
*Non-conference game; ^{†}Homecoming; Rankings from AP Poll released prior to the game; All times are in Eastern time
