= Josh McNary =

American football player (born 1988)

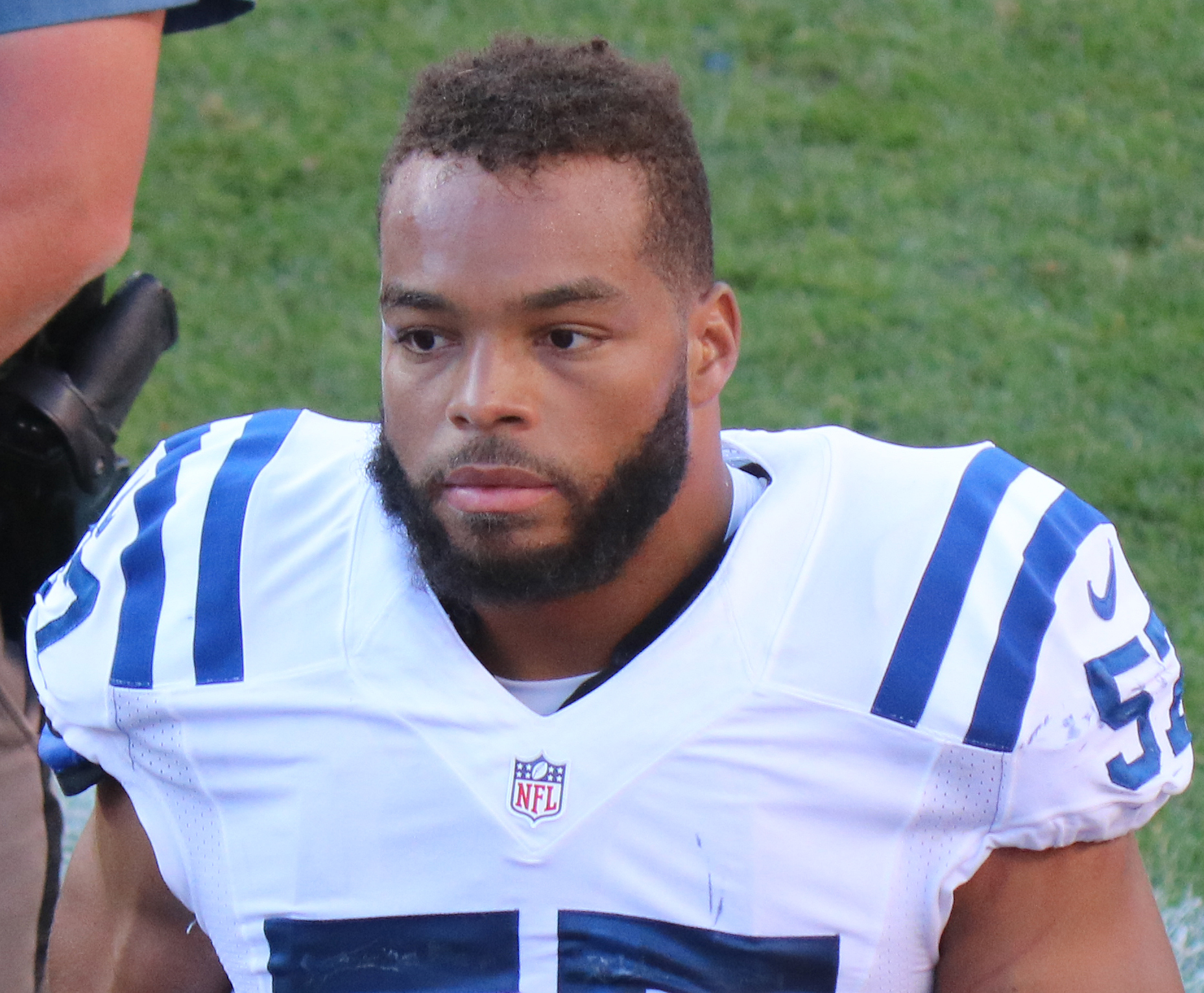
- McNary in the 2016 NFL season

No. 57
- Position: Linebacker

Personal information
- Born: April 10, 1988 (age 38); Houston, Texas, U.S.
- Listed height: 6 ft 0 in (1.83 m)
- Listed weight: 251 lb (114 kg)

Career information
- High school: Clear Lake (Houston)
- College: Army
- NFL draft: 2011: undrafted

Career history
- Indianapolis Colts (2013–2016); Jacksonville Jaguars (2017)*
- * Offseason or practice squad member only

Career NFL statistics
- Total tackles: 79
- Sacks: 0.5
- Forced fumbles: 1
- Stats at Pro Football Reference

Joshua Aaron McNary (born April 10, 1988) is an American former professional football player who was a linebacker in the National Football League (NFL). He played college football for the Army Black Knights, and signed with the Indianapolis Colts as an undrafted free agent in 2013.

== Early life ==
McNary played football at Clear Lake High School in Houston. Going into his senior season the team was short on defensive linemen and he was a backup strong safety. With the defensive line coach, Michael Boone, looking for athletic players to fill the positions that were open, he asked to work with McNary and converted him to nose guard. McNary was an all-district selection for the nose guard position. Even though he led the team in sacks, he was not offered any scholarships because he only played defensive line for one season and lacked the ideal size for the college level.

== College career ==
McNary finished his career at the United States Military Academy as Army's all-time leader in sacks (28.0) and tackles for loss (49), while adding 195 tackles (117 solo), nine passes defensed, five forced fumbles and three fumble recoveries. He is the only player in school history to record two double-digit sack seasons, and also held school records for the most sacks in a single game (4.0) and a single season (12.5).

As a senior in 2010, McNary capped off his career by returning a fumble 55 yards for a touchdown in the Black Knights’ 16–14 victory over SMU in the Bell Helicopter Armed Forces Bowl. The win gave Army its first winning season since 1996 and first postseason victory since the 1985 Peach Bowl. McNary was one of five finalists for the 2010 Burlsworth Trophy, which honors the most-outstanding college football player who began his career as a walk-on. He was also on the preseason watch lists for the 2010 Lombardi and Nagurski awards, and was a semifinalist for the 2010 Lott IMPACT Trophy, which is presented to the nation's top defensive player.

Following his senior year, McNary was honored with the 2011 East-West Shrine Game Pat Tillman Award, given to the player who best exemplifies character, intelligence, sportsmanship, and service.

== Professional career ==
=== Indianapolis Colts ===
McNary served two years of active military service and on April 10, 2013, the Indianapolis Colts signed him to a free-agent contract. McNary was placed on the Reserve/Military List but on July 30, 2013 was moved to the active roster and joined the team in training camp. McNary did not survive 53-man roster cuts to start the season, but immediately returned to the team, being signed to Indianapolis' practice squad. That is where McNary would stay for 12 weeks. During the beginning of the week before the Colts' Week 13 matchup with division rival Tennessee, McNary was elevated for the first time to the Colts' active 53-man roster.

On September 6, 2015, McNary was signed to the Colts' practice squad. He appeared in 13 games for the Colts in 2015 before being placed on injured reserve on December 29.

=== Jacksonville Jaguars ===
On March 16, 2017, McNary signed with the Jacksonville Jaguars. He was released on September 2, 2017.

== Criminal accusations ==
On January 14, 2015, McNary was charged with one count of rape, one count of criminal confinement and one count of battery, according to court documents filed by the Marion county prosecutor. The alleged incident happened on or around December 1, 2014, after McNary met the accuser at a bar in downtown Indianapolis. The accuser took McNary's phone from his apartment on the way out, and police were able to unlock it after obtaining a search warrant, revealing the identity of McNary. McNary was found not guilty of all charges on September 3, 2015.
