= 2002 Southern Miss Golden Eagles football team =

American college football season

2002 Southern Miss Golden Eagles football

Houston Bowl, L 23–33 vs. Oklahoma State
- Conference: Conference USA
- Record: 7–6 (5–3 C-USA)
- Head coach: Jeff Bower (13th season)
- Offensive coordinator: Chris Klenakis (3rd season)
- Offensive scheme: Multiple
- Defensive coordinator: Tyrone Nix (2nd season)
- Base defense: 3–4
- Home stadium: M. M. Roberts Stadium

2002 Conference USA football standings
	Conf.			Overall
Team	W		L	W		L
Cincinnati +	6	–	2	7	–	7
No. 23 TCU +	6	–	2	10	–	2
Louisville	5	–	3	7	–	6
Southern Miss	5	–	3	7	–	6
Tulane	4	–	4	8	–	5
UAB	4	–	4	5	–	7
East Carolina	4	–	4	4	–	8
Houston	3	–	5	5	–	7
Memphis	2	–	6	3	–	9
Army	1	–	7	1	–	11
+ – Conference co-champions; Rankings from AP Poll

The 2002 Southern Miss Golden Eagles football team represented the University of Southern Mississippi in the 2002 NCAA Division I-A football season. The Golden Eagles were led by head coach Jeff Bower and played their home games at M. M. Roberts Stadium. They were a member of Conference USA.

== Schedule ==
Date	Time	Opponent	Site	TV	Result	Attendance	Source
August 31	6:00 pm	Jackson State*	M. M. Roberts Stadium; Hattiesburg, MS		W 55–7	35,169	
September 7	11:00 am	Illinois*	M. M. Roberts Stadium; Hattiesburg, MS	ESPN2	W 23–20	22,183	
September 14	6:00 pm	Memphis	M. M. Roberts Stadium; Hattiesburg, MS (Black and Blue Bowl)	ESPNGP	W 33–14	28,419	
September 21	6:00 pm	at Alabama*	Bryant–Denny Stadium; Tuscaloosa, AL	ESPN2	L 7–20	83,818	
September 28	12:00 pm	at Army	Michie Stadium; West Point, NY		W 27–6	31,402	
October 12	6:00 pm	at South Florida	Raymond James Stadium; Tampa, FL		L 13–16	28,181	
October 19	1:00 pm	Cincinnati^{†}	M. M. Roberts Stadium; Hattiesburg, MS		W 23–14	28,031	
October 30	6:30 pm	at TCU	Amon G. Carter Stadium; Fort Worth, TX	ESPN2	L 7–37	26,612	
November 9	2:00 pm	at UAB	Legion Field; Birmingham, AL		W 20–13	19,968	
November 14	6:45 pm	Louisville	M. M. Roberts Stadium; Hattiesburg, MS	ESPN	L 17–20 ^{2OT}	28,076	
November 23	2:30 pm	at Tulane	Louisiana Superdome; New Orleans, LA		L 10–31	21,832	
November 30	2:00 pm	East Carolina	M. M. Roberts Stadium; Hattiesburg, MS		W 24–7	19,888	
December 27	1:30 pm	vs. Oklahoma State*	Reliant Stadium; Houston, TX (Houston Bowl)	ESPN	L 23–33	44,687	
*Non-conference game; ^{†}Homecoming; All times are in Central time

== Roster ==
2002 Southern Miss Golden Eagles football team roster
Players
Coaches
Offense

Pos.	#	Name	Class
QB	9	Dustin Almond	Fr
RB	43	Derrick Nix	Sr
G	73	Jeremy Bridges	Sr
G	76	Torrin Tucker	Sr

Defense

Pos.	#	Name	Class
LB	32	Terry Anderson	So
DB	12	Darrell Bennett	So
LB	27	Michael Boley	So
DB	5	Greg Brooks	Jr
LB	42	Antoine Cash	So
LB	24	Rod Davis	Jr
CB	34	Etric Pruitt	Jr

Special teams

Pos.	#	Name	Class

Head coach

- Jeff Bower

Coordinators/assistant coaches

Legend

- (C) Team captain
- (S) Suspended
- (I) Ineligible
- Injured
- Redshirt

Roster
