= 2004 Cincinnati Bearcats football team =

American college football season

2004 Cincinnati Bearcats football

Fort Worth Bowl champion

Fort Worth Bowl, W 32–14 vs. Marshall
- Conference: Conference USA
- Record: 7–5 (5–3 C-USA)
- Head coach: Mark Dantonio (1st season)
- Offensive coordinator: Don Treadwell (1st season)
- Offensive scheme: Multiple
- Defensive coordinator: Pat Narduzzi (1st season)
- Base defense: 4–3
- Home stadium: Nippert Stadium

2004 Conference USA football standings
	Conf.			Overall
Team	W		L	W		L
No. 6 Louisville $	8	–	0	11	–	1
Memphis	5	–	3	8	–	4
Southern Miss	5	–	3	7	–	5
Cincinnati	5	–	3	7	–	5
UAB	5	–	3	7	–	5
TCU	3	–	5	5	–	6
Tulane	3	–	5	5	–	6
South Florida	3	–	5	4	–	7
Houston	3	–	5	3	–	8
East Carolina	2	–	6	2	–	9
Army	2	–	6	2	–	9
$ – Conference champion; Rankings from AP Poll

The 2004 Cincinnati Bearcats football team represented the University of Cincinnati in the 2004 NCAA Division I-A football season. The team, coached by Mark Dantonio, played its home games in Nippert Stadium, as it has since 1924. This was the Bearcats last season in Conference USA as they became members of the Big East Conference after the academic year.

== Schedule ==
Date	Time	Opponent	Site	TV	Result	Attendance	Source
September 4	12:00 pm	at No. 9 Ohio State*	Ohio Stadium; Columbus, OH	ABC	L 6–27	104,604	
September 11	7:00 pm	Miami (OH)*	Nippert Stadium; Cincinnati, OH (Victory Bell)		W 45–26	30,368	
September 18	12:00 pm	at Syracuse*	Carrier Dome; Syracuse, NY	ESPN Plus	L 7–19	32,893	
September 25	7:00 pm	at East Carolina	Dowdy–Ficklen Stadium; Greenville, NC		W 24–19	29,332	
October 2	7:00 pm	UAB	Nippert Stadium; Cincinnati, OH		L 27–30	21,053	
October 9	1:00 pm	at Army	Michie Stadium; West Point, NY		L 29–48	31,144	
October 23	7:00 pm	Memphis	Nippert Stadium; Cincinnati, OH (rivalry)	ESPNGP	W 49–10	15,092	
October 30	3:00 pm	TCU	Nippert Stadium; Cincinnati, OH		W 21–10	20,453	
November 6	3:00 pm	No. 21 Southern Miss	M. M. Roberts Stadium; Hattiesburg, MS		W 52–24	30,690	
November 20	3:30 pm	South Florida	Nippert Stadium; Cincinnati, OH	FSN	W 45–23	19,309	
November 27	2:30 pm	at No. 7 Louisville	Papa John's Cardinal Stadium; Louisville, KY (The Keg of Nails)	ESPN2	L 7–70	37,617	
December 23	6:30 pm	vs. Marshall*	Amon G. Carter Stadium; Fort Worth, TX (Fort Worth Bowl)	ESPN	W 32–14	27,902	
*Non-conference game; Rankings from AP Poll released prior to the game; All times are in Eastern time

== Awards and milestones ==
=== Conference USA honors ===
==== Offensive player of the week ====
- Week 2: Richard Hall
- Week 9: Gino Guidugli
- Week 11: Gino Guidugli

==== Defensive player of the week ====
- Week 4: Trent Cole
- Week 8: Andre Frazier

==== Special teams player of the week ====
- Week 8: Chet Ervin

==== All-Conference USA First Team ====
- Kyle Takavitz, OG
- Trent Cole, DE
- Andre Frazier, DE

==== All-Conference USA Second Team ====
- Brent Celek, TE
- Hannibal Thomas, WR
- Jamar Enzor, LB
- Daven Holly, DB
- Doug Monaghan, DB

==== All-Conference USA Third Team ====
- Richard Hall, RB
- Clint Stickdorn, OT
- Tyjuan Hagler, LB

==== All-Conference USA Freshman Team ====
- Anthony Hoke, DE
- Doug Jones, FB

== Players in the 2005 NFL draft ==
Player	Position	Round	Pick	NFL club
Trent Cole	DE	5	146	Philadelphia Eagles
Tyjuan Hagler	LB	5	173	Indianapolis Colts
Daven Holly	CB	7	215	San Francisco 49ers
