= 2002 Memphis Tigers football team =

American college football season

2002 Memphis Tigers football
- Conference: Conference USA
- Record: 3–9 (2–7 C-USA)
- Head coach: Tommy West (2nd season)
- Offensive coordinator: Randy Fichtner (2nd season)
- Offensive scheme: Pro-style
- Defensive coordinator: Rick Whitt (2nd season)
- Base defense: 4–3
- Home stadium: Liberty Bowl Memorial Stadium

2002 Conference USA football standings
	Conf.			Overall
Team	W		L	W		L
Cincinnati +	6	–	2	7	–	7
No. 23 TCU +	6	–	2	10	–	2
Louisville	5	–	3	7	–	6
Southern Miss	5	–	3	7	–	6
Tulane	4	–	4	8	–	5
UAB	4	–	4	5	–	7
East Carolina	4	–	4	4	–	8
Houston	3	–	5	5	–	7
Memphis	2	–	6	3	–	9
Army	1	–	7	1	–	11
+ – Conference co-champions; Rankings from AP Poll

The 2002 Memphis Tigers football team represented the University of Memphis in the 2002 NCAA Division I-A football season. Memphis competed as a member of the Conference USA. The team was led by head coach Tommy West. The Tigers played their home games at the Liberty Bowl Memorial Stadium.

== Schedule ==
Date	Time	Opponent	Site	TV	Result	Attendance	Source
August 31	7:00 pm	Murray State*	Liberty Bowl Memorial Stadium; Memphis, TN		W 52–6	29,694	
September 7	11:30 am	at Ole Miss*	Vaught–Hemingway Stadium; Oxford, MS (rivalry)	JPS	L 16–38	54,718	
September 14	6:00 pm	at Southern Miss	M. M. Roberts Stadium; Hattiesburg, MS (Black and Blue Bowl)	ESPNGP	L 14–33	28,419	
September 21	7:00 pm	Tulane	Liberty Bowl Memorial Stadium; Memphis, TN		W 38–10	32,120	
September 28	6:00 pm	at UAB	Legion Field; Birmingham, AL (Battle for the Bones)	ESPNGP	L 17–31	14,179	
October 8	7:00 pm	Louisville	Liberty Bowl Memorial Stadium; Memphis, TN (rivalry)	ESPN2	L 32–38	44,081	
October 19	7:00 pm	Mississippi State*	Liberty Bowl Memorial Stadium; Memphis, TN		L 17–29	28,209	
October 26	1:00 pm	at Cincinnati	Nippert Stadium; Cincinnati, OH (rivalry)		L 10–48	20,747	
November 2	1:00 pm	Houston	Liberty Bowl Memorial Stadium; Memphis, TN		L 21–26	20,532	
November 9	6:00 pm	at South Florida	Raymond James Stadium; Tampa, FL		L 28–31	32,770	
November 23	1:00 pm	Army	Liberty Bowl Memorial Stadium; Memphis, TN		W 38–10	20,906	
November 30	2:00 pm	at TCU	Amon G. Carter Stadium; Fort Worth, TX		L 20–27	24,583	
*Non-conference game; All times are in Central time

== Roster ==
2002 Memphis Tigers football team roster
Players
Coaches
Offense

Pos.	#	Name	Class
G	60	Eric Anderson	Sr
WR	15	Travis Anglin	Sr
QB	1	Maurice Avery	Fr
RB	24	Dante Brown	Jr
QB	12	Scott Scherer	Sr
OT	71	Wade Smith	Sr
WR	28	Darron White	So
OT	57	Doug Whittaker	Sr
RB	20	DeAngelo Williams	Fr
QB	18	Danny Wimprine	So

Defense

Pos.	#	Name	Class
DT	50	Eric Taylor	Jr

Special teams

Pos.	#	Name	Class

Head coach

- Tommy West

Coordinators/assistant coaches

- Russ Huesman
  (Tight ends coach)

Legend

- (C) Team captain
- (S) Suspended
- (I) Ineligible
- Injured
- Redshirt

Roster
Last update: 2002-12-20
