= 2008 Army Black Knights football team =

American college football season

2008 Army Black Knights football
- Conference: Independent
- Record: 3–9
- Head coach: Stan Brock (2nd season)
- Offensive coordinator: Tim Walsh (2nd season)
- Offensive scheme: "Brock bone" option
- Defensive coordinator: John Mumford (5th season)
- Base defense: 4–3
- Captains: Collin Mooney; John Plumstead; Frank Scappaticci; Mike Wright
- Home stadium: Michie Stadium

2008 NCAA Division I FBS independents football records
	Conf.			Overall
Team	W		L	W		L
Navy		–		8	–	5
Notre Dame		–		7	–	6
Army		–		3	–	9
WKU		–		2	–	10
Rankings from AP Poll

The 2008 Army Black Knights football team represented the United States Military Academy (USMA or "West Point") as an independent during the 2008 NCAA Division I FBS football season. The team was led by second-year head coach Stan Brock, who, amidst pressure from critics, had changed from a pro-style offense to a triple option-like offensive scheme after the previous season. Some pundits dubbed it the "Brock Bone" or "quadruple" option, due to an added passing element. The team finished the season with a disappointing 3–9 record, which culminated in a 34–0 rout by archrival Navy. Brock was subsequently fired and replaced by former Cal Poly head coach, Rich Ellerson. The 2008 Army–Navy Game was the first shut-out of Army by Navy since 1978. One consolation was that in the game's final play, Army fullback Collin Mooney, in the last play of his college football career, broke the school record for single-season rushing by a single yard.

== Schedule ==
Date	Time	Opponent	Site	TV	Result	Attendance
August 29	7:00 p.m.	Temple	Michie Stadium; West Point, NY	ESPN Classic	L 35–7	21,822
September 6	1:00 p.m.	No. 15 New Hampshire	Michie Stadium; West Point, NY	ESPN Classic	L 28–10	25,762
September 20	1:00 p.m.	Akron	Michie Stadium; West Point, NY	ESPN Classic	L 22–3	27,040
September 27	12:30 p.m.	at Texas A&M	Kyle Field; College Station, TX	Versus	L 21–17	84,090
October 4	3:00 p.m.	at Tulane	Tad Gormley Stadium; New Orleans, LA	CST	W 44–13	23,794
October 11	1:00 p.m.	Eastern Michigan	Michie Stadium; West Point, NY	ESPN Classic	W 17–13	27,096
October 18	2:30 p.m.	at Buffalo	UB Stadium; Buffalo, NY	TWCSN	L 27–24 ^{OT}	21,719
October 25	1:00 p.m.	Louisiana Tech	Michie Stadium; West Point, NY	ESPN360	W 14–7	27,383
November 1	12:00 p.m.	Air Force	Michie Stadium; West Point, NY (Commander-in-Chief's Trophy)	ESPNU	L 16–7	37,409
November 8	3:00 p.m.	at Rice	Rice Stadium; Houston, TX		L 38–31	19,243
November 22	12:00 p.m.	at Rutgers	Rutgers Stadium; Piscataway, NJ	Big East Network	L 30–3	42,212
December 6	12:00 p.m.	vs. Navy	Lincoln Financial Field; Philadelphia, PA (Army–Navy Game)	CBS	L 34–0	69,144
Rankings from The Sports Network Poll released prior to the game; All times are in Eastern time

== Roster ==
2008 Army Black Knights football team roster
Players
Coaches
Offense

Pos.	#	Name	Class
RB	2	Justin Turner	Jr
RB	3	Carlo Sandiego	Sr
RB	4	Geoffrey Hewitt	Jr
WR	4	Joe Leforte	Sr
WR	8	Mike Wright	Sr
RB	15	Jameson Clark	Jr
RB	23	Wesley McMahand	Sr
WR	25	Jamison Maehler	Sr
RB	28	Tony Dace	Sr
RB	30	Collin Mooney	Sr
RB	33	Robert McClary	So
RB	33	Andre Shinda	Fr
OL	63	Mike Lemming	Sr
C	64	Trey Miranne
OL	79	Brandon Cox	Sr
TE	88	Mike Evans	Sr
OL	95	Jeremy Jonas	Jr
WR		Mark Allen	So
OT		Joe Bailey	Fr
WR		Austin Barr	Fr
FB		Jacob Bohn	So
QB		Chip Bowden	So
WR		Sean Boyle	Fr
WR		Davyd Brooks	Fr
FB		Bryson Carl	Jr
TE		Matt Coulthard	Jr
RB		Kingsley Ehie	So
RB		George Fletcher	Fr
C		Thomas Hagan	So
QB		Taylor Hall	Fr
OL		Patrick Hastings	Fr
QB		Danny Hinkson	Fr
WR		Damion Hunter	Jr
QB		Max Jenkins	Fr
OT		Jason Johnson	Jr
QB		Josh Jones	Fr
TE		Brad Kelly	Fr
FB		John King	Fr
QB		Desmond Lamb	So
FB		Chad Littlejohn	Fr
OL		Mike McDermott	Fr
WR		Brian McSween	Jr
RB		Patrick Mealy	So
OT		Anees Merzi	So
TE		Todd Miller	So
C		Zach Peterson	So
OL		Jordan Pleasants	Fr
QB		Chase Prasnicki	Jr
OL		Tyson Quink
QB		Jimmy Reitter	Fr
RB		Nelson Simmons	So
RB		Ian Smith	Jr
OT		David Sprague	Jr
QB		Trent Steelman
C		Karl Thompson	Jr
WR		Matt Vane	So
TE		Ali Villanueva
RB		Justin Volk	Fr
RB		Melvin Walker	So
OT		Mikel Weich	So
QB		Carson Williams	Jr
RB		CeDarius Williams	Fr

Defense

Pos.	#	Name	Class
DB	2	Richard King	So
LB	3	Steven Erzinger	Fr
LB	5	Rod Murray	So
DB	9	Markenson Pierre	Sr
DB	20	Lowell Garthwaite	Sr
DB	22	T.J. Walker	Sr
DB	26	David Black	Sr
CB	31	Lawrence Brown
DL	39	Joe Paolini	Sr
LB	42	John Plumstead	Sr
LB	43	Matt Eason	Sr
LB	46	Frank Scappaticci	Sr
LB	48	Peter Anderson	Sr
DE	49	Nick Emmons	Jr
LB	50	Stephen Anderson	So
DL	99	Ted Bentler	Jr
CB		Antuan Aaron	Fr
LB		Kyle Bates	Jr
DE		Fritz Bentler	Jr
DB		L.B. Brown	So
LB		Broghan Carnes	Fr
DE		Emmett Cosgrove	Fr
LB		Andrew DiEugenio	Jr
DB		Donnie Dixon	So
DE		Derek Eling	Fr
DB		Jack Finan	Fr
LB		David Ford	Fr
DB		Johnny Franco IV	Fr
DT		Mike Gann	Jr
DB		Mario Hill	Jr
DE		Marcus Hilton	So
DE		Carson Homme	So
DB		Eric Jones	Fr
DL		Robert Kava	Fr
DB		Dean Lisante	Jr
LB		Brad Marren	Jr
LB		Josh McNary	So
DB		Jamal Olatunde	So
LB		Bill Prosko	Fr
DB		Joseph Puttmann	Jr
DT		Seth Reed	So
DE		Erik Robichaud	Fr
LB		Andrew Rodriguez	Fr
DE		Jason Rothamel	Fr
LB		Justin Schaaf	Fr
DE		Phillip Smith	Jr
DT		Greg Spencer	Jr
DT		Christopher Swain	Fr
LB		Chad Thayer	Jr
DB		Donovan Travis	So
DB		Jordan Trimble	So
DE		Victor Ugenyi	Jr
DB		Sean Westphal	So
DE		Adam Wilde	Fr

Special teams

Pos.	#	Name	Class
K	4	Adam Demarco	Sr
P	18	Andrew Rinehart	Sr
K		Tom Balough	Fr
P		Jonathan Bulls	So
K		Matthew Campbell	So
K		Alex Carlton	Fr
LS		Frank Ceva	Fr
P		Kolin Walk	Fr

Head coach

- Stan Brock

Coordinators/assistant coaches

- Tim Walsh – Offensive coordinator
- John Mumford – Defensive coordinator
- Tony Coaxum – Linebackers/cornerbacks

Legend

- (C) Team captain
- (S) Suspended
- (I) Ineligible
- Injured
- Redshirt

Roster
