= 2002 TCU Horned Frogs football team =

American college football season

2002 TCU Horned Frogs football

C-USA co-champion Liberty Bowl champion

Liberty Bowl, W 17–3 vs. Colorado State
- Conference: Conference USA

Ranking
- Coaches: No. 22
- AP: No. 23
- Record: 10–2 (6–2 C-USA)
- Head coach: Gary Patterson (2nd season)
- Offensive coordinator: Mike Schultz (5th season)
- Offensive scheme: Spread
- Defensive coordinator: David Bailiff (1st season)
- Base defense: 4–2–5
- Home stadium: Amon G. Carter Stadium

2002 Conference USA football standings
	Conf.			Overall
Team	W		L	W		L
Cincinnati +	6	–	2	7	–	7
No. 23 TCU +	6	–	2	10	–	2
Louisville	5	–	3	7	–	6
Southern Miss	5	–	3	7	–	6
Tulane	4	–	4	8	–	5
UAB	4	–	4	5	–	7
East Carolina	4	–	4	4	–	8
Houston	3	–	5	5	–	7
Memphis	2	–	6	3	–	9
Army	1	–	7	1	–	11
+ – Conference co-champions; Rankings from AP Poll

The 2002 TCU Horned Frogs football team represented Texas Christian University in the 2002 NCAA Division I-A football season. TCU finished with a 10–2 (6–2 C-USA) record. The team was coached by Gary Patterson and played their home games at Amon G. Carter Stadium, which is located on campus in Fort Worth.

== Schedule ==
Date	Time	Opponent	Rank	Site	TV	Result	Attendance
September 2	3:30 p.m.	at Cincinnati		Nippert Stadium; Cincinnati, OH	ESPN	L 29–36 ^{OT}	15,518
September 7	1:00 p.m.	at Northwestern*		Ryan Field; Evanston, IL	ESPN+	W 48–24	21,442
September 14	6:00 p.m.	SMU*		Amon G. Carter Stadium; Fort Worth, TX (Battle for the Iron Skillet)		W 17–6	30,621
September 21	6:00 p.m.	North Texas*		Amon G. Carter Stadium; Fort Worth, TX		W 16–10	33,281
October 5	2:00 p.m.	Houston^{†}		Amon G. Carter Stadium; Fort Worth, TX		W 34–17	24,088
October 12	5:00 p.m.	at Army		Michie Stadium; West Point, NY		W 46–27	32,454
October 19	1:00 p.m.	at Louisville		Papa John's Cardinal Stadium; Louisville, KY	ESPN+	W 45–31	34,127
October 30	6:30 p.m.	Southern Miss		Amon G. Carter Stadium; Fort Worth, TX	ESPN2	W 37–7	26,612
November 9	2:00 p.m.	Tulane		Amon G. Carter Stadium; Fort Worth, TX		W 17–10	27,694
November 23	1:00 p.m.	at East Carolina	No. 22	Dowdy–Ficklen Stadium; Greenville, NC		L 28–31	23,189
November 30	1:00 p.m.	Memphis		Amon G. Carter Stadium; Fort Worth, TX		W 27–20	24,583
December 31	2:30 p.m.	Colorado State*		Liberty Bowl Memorial Stadium; Memphis, TN (Liberty Bowl)	ESPN	W 17–3	55,207
*Non-conference game; ^{†}Homecoming; Rankings from Coaches' Poll released prior to the game; All times are in Central time

== Roster ==
2002 TCU Horned Frogs football team roster
Players
Coaches
Offense

Pos.	#	Name	Class
OT	55	Anthony Alabi	So
TE	91	Chad Andrus	Fr
G	61	Ben Angeley	Fr
G	70	J.T. Aughinbaugh	Sr
QB	16	Jeff Ballard	Fr
OT	63	Brady Barrick	Sr
WR	3	LaTarence Dunbar	Sr
QB	15	Tye Gunn	Fr
WR	81	Reggie Harrell	So
RB	30	Lonta Hobbs	Fr
WR	13	Adrian Madise	Sr
WR	17	Cory Rodgers	Fr
QB	6	Sean Stilley	Sr
OT	72	Michael Toudouze	Fr

Defense

Pos.	#	Name	Class
CB	26	Bobby Blankenship	Sr
DB	39	Jason Goss	Sr
LB	44	LaMarcus McDonald	Sr
FS	20	Chris Peoples	So
DE	94	Robert Pollard	Jr
NT	6	Chad Pugh	Jr
DE	88	Ranorris Ray	Fr
DE	83	Jared Retkofsky	Fr
CB	4	Tyrone Sanders	Jr
DE	21	Bo Schobel	Jr
SS	43	Jared Smitherman	Sr

Special teams

Pos.	#	Name	Class
K	9	Nick Browne	Jr

Head coach

- Gary Patterson

Coordinators/assistant coaches

Legend

- (C) Team captain
- (S) Suspended
- (I) Ineligible
- Injured
- Redshirt

Roster
Last update: 2002-10-24

== Team players in the NFL ==
Player	Position	Round	Pick	NFL club
Adrian Madise	Wide receiver	5	158	Denver Broncos
LaTarence Dunbar	Wide Receiver	6	196	Atlanta Falcons
