= 2004 TCU Horned Frogs football team =

American college football season

2004 TCU Horned Frogs football
- Conference: Conference USA
- Record: 5–6 (3–5 C-USA)
- Head coach: Gary Patterson (4th season)
- Offensive coordinator: Mike Schultz (7th season)
- Offensive scheme: Spread
- Defensive coordinator: Dick Bumpas (1st season)
- Base defense: 4–2–5
- Home stadium: Amon G. Carter Stadium

2004 Conference USA football standings
	Conf.			Overall
Team	W		L	W		L
No. 6 Louisville $	8	–	0	11	–	1
Memphis	5	–	3	8	–	4
Southern Miss	5	–	3	7	–	5
Cincinnati	5	–	3	7	–	5
UAB	5	–	3	7	–	5
TCU	3	–	5	5	–	6
Tulane	3	–	5	5	–	6
South Florida	3	–	5	4	–	7
Houston	3	–	5	3	–	8
East Carolina	2	–	6	2	–	9
Army	2	–	6	2	–	9
$ – Conference champion; Rankings from AP Poll

The 2004 TCU Horned Frogs football team represented Texas Christian University in the 2004 NCAA Division I-A football season. TCU finished with a 5–6 (3–5 C-USA) record.

The team was coached by Gary Patterson and played their home games at Amon G. Carter Stadium, which is located on campus in Fort Worth. This was TCU's final year as a member of Conference USA before moving to the Mountain West Conference (MWC).

== Schedule ==
Date	Time	Opponent	Site	TV	Result	Attendance	Source
September 2	8:30 p.m.	Northwestern*	Amon G. Carter Stadium; Fort Worth, TX	ESPN2	W 48–45 ^{2OT}	26,843	
September 11	7:00 p.m.	SMU*	Amon G. Carter Stadium; Fort Worth, TX (Battle for the Iron Skillet)		W 44–0	33,458	
September 18	11:30 a.m.	at Texas Tech*	Jones SBC Stadium; Lubbock, TX (rivalry)	FSN	L 35–70	51,271	
September 25	6:00 p.m.	South Florida	Amon Carter Stadium; Fort Worth, TX	ESPN Plus	L 44–45 ^{OT}	27,546	
October 2	12:00 p.m.	at Army	Michie Stadium; West Point, NY		W 21–17	32,707	
October 15	7:00 p.m.	at UAB	Legion Field; Birmingham, AL	ESPN	L 25–41	33,280	
October 23	6:00 p.m.	Houston^{†}	Amon G. Carter Stadium; Fort Worth, TX		W 34–27	36,276	
October 30	2:00 p.m.	at Cincinnati	Nippert Stadium; Cincinnati, OH	KTXA	L 10–21	20,453	
November 10	5:35 p.m.	at Louisville	Papa John's Cardinal Stadium; Louisville, KY	ESPN2	L 28–55	40,107	
November 20	2:00 p.m.	Southern Miss	Amon G. Carter Stadium; Fort Worth, TX		W 42–17	27,992	
November 27	2:00 p.m.	Tulane	Amon G. Carter Stadium; Fort Worth, TX		L 31–35	24,362	
*Non-conference game; ^{†}Homecoming; All times are in Central time
