= 2004 South Florida Bulls football team =

American college football season

2004 South Florida Bulls football
- Conference: Conference USA
- Record: 4–7 (3–5 CUSA)
- Head coach: Jim Leavitt (8th season)
- Offensive coordinator: Mike Hobbie (4th season)
- Offensive scheme: Multiple
- Co-defensive coordinators: Rick Kravitz (8th season); Wally Burnham (4th season)
- Base defense: 3–4
- Home stadium: Raymond James Stadium

2004 Conference USA football standings
	Conf.			Overall
Team	W		L	W		L
No. 6 Louisville $	8	–	0	11	–	1
Memphis	5	–	3	8	–	4
Southern Miss	5	–	3	7	–	5
Cincinnati	5	–	3	7	–	5
UAB	5	–	3	7	–	5
TCU	3	–	5	5	–	6
Tulane	3	–	5	5	–	6
South Florida	3	–	5	4	–	7
Houston	3	–	5	3	–	8
East Carolina	2	–	6	2	–	9
Army	2	–	6	2	–	9
$ – Conference champion; Rankings from AP Poll

The 2004 South Florida Bulls football team represented the University of South Florida (USF) in the 2004 NCAA Division I-A football season. Their head coach was Jim Leavitt, and the USF Bulls played their home games at Raymond James Stadium in Tampa, FL. The 2004 college football season was only the 8th season overall for the Bulls, and their second and final season in Conference USA.

== Schedule ==
Date	Time	Opponent	Site	TV	Result	Attendance	Source
September 11	7:00 p.m.	Tennessee Tech*	Raymond James Stadium; Tampa, FL		W 21–7	25,546	
September 18	7:00 p.m.	at South Carolina*	Williams–Brice Stadium; Columbia, SC		L 3–34	78,900	
September 25	7:00 p.m.	at TCU	Amon G. Carter Stadium; Fort Worth, TX	ESPN Plus	W 45–44 ^{2OT}	27,546	
October 2	7:00 p.m.	Southern Miss	Raymond James Stadium; Tampa, FL	ESPN Plus	L 20–27	30,049	
October 16	7:00 p.m.	Army^{†}	Raymond James Stadium; Tampa, FL	ESPN Plus	L 35–42	36,549	
October 22	8:00 p.m.	at No. 17 Louisville	Papa John's Cardinal Stadium; Louisville, KY	ESPN	L 9–41	42,032	
November 3	7:30 p.m.	at UAB	Legion Field; Birmingham, AL	ESPN2	W 45–20	9,220	
November 13	7:00 p.m.	East Carolina	Raymond James Stadium; Tampa, FL	SUN	W 41–17	25,408	
November 20	3:30 p.m.	at Cincinnati	Nippert Stadium; Cincinnati, OH	SUN	L 23–45	19,309	
November 27	11:00 a.m.	Memphis	Raymond James Stadium; Tampa, FL	ESPN2	L 15–31	21,392	
December 4	11:00 a.m.	No. 19 Pittsburgh*	Raymond James Stadium; Tampa, FL	ESPN2	L 14–43	23,417	
*Non-conference game; ^{†}Homecoming; Rankings from AP Poll released prior to the game; All times are in Eastern time
