= 2004 Tulane Green Wave football team =

American college football season

2004 Tulane Green Wave football
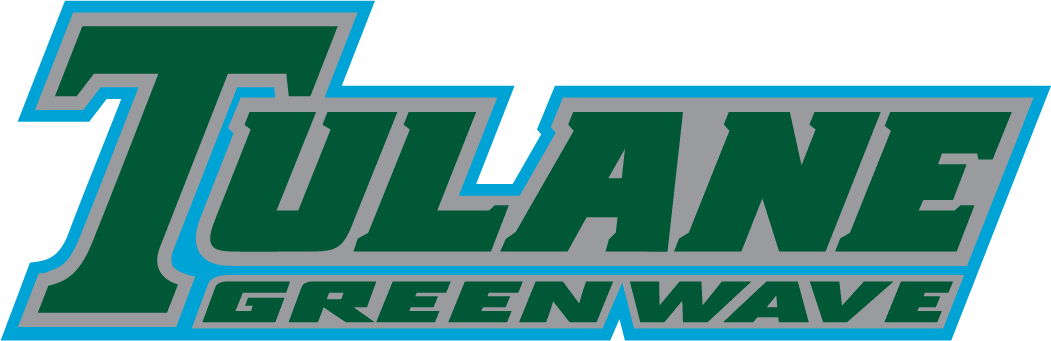
- Conference: Conference USA
- Record: 5–6 (3–5 C-USA)
- Head coach: Chris Scelfo (6th season)
- Offensive coordinator: Frank Scelfo (4th season)
- Offensive scheme: Multiple
- Defensive coordinator: Eric Schumann (3rd season)
- Base defense: 4–3
- Home stadium: Louisiana Superdome; Tad Gormley Stadium

2004 Conference USA football standings
	Conf.			Overall
Team	W		L	W		L
No. 6 Louisville $	8	–	0	11	–	1
Memphis	5	–	3	8	–	4
Southern Miss	5	–	3	7	–	5
Cincinnati	5	–	3	7	–	5
UAB	5	–	3	7	–	5
TCU	3	–	5	5	–	6
Tulane	3	–	5	5	–	6
South Florida	3	–	5	4	–	7
Houston	3	–	5	3	–	8
East Carolina	2	–	6	2	–	9
Army	2	–	6	2	–	9
$ – Conference champion; Rankings from AP Poll

The 2004 Tulane Green Wave football team represented Tulane University in the 2004 NCAA Division I-A football season. The Green Wave played their home games at the Louisiana Superdome and Tad Gormley Stadium. They competed in the West Division of Conference USA. The team was coached by head coach Chris Scelfo.

== Schedule ==
Date	Time	Opponent	Site	TV	Result	Attendance	Source
September 4	5:00 pm	at Mississippi State*	Davis Wade Stadium; Starkville, MS	ESPN2	L 7–28	52,114	
September 11	6:00 pm	Florida A&M*	Louisiana Superdome; New Orleans, LA		W 39–19	23,214	
September 25	7:00 pm	Southern Miss	Louisiana Superdome; New Orleans, LA (Battle for the Bell)		L 14–32	27,211	
October 9	1:00 pm	at East Carolina	Dowdy–Ficklen Stadium; Greenville, NC	ESPN Plus	L 25–27	29,584	
October 16	1:00 pm	at Memphis	Liberty Bowl Memorial Stadium; Memphis, TN		L 24–49	32,897	
October 23	2:30 pm	UAB^{†}	Tad Gormley Stadium; New Orleans, LA	ESPN Plus	W 59–55	22,541	
October 30	4:00 pm	at Houston	Robertson Stadium; Houston, TX		L 3–24	17,204	
November 6	6:00 pm	Navy*	Louisiana Superdome; New Orleans, LA		W 42–10	21,484	
November 13	6:00 pm	Army	Louisiana Superdome; New Orleans, LA		W 45–31	20,357	
November 27	2:00 pm	at TCU	Amon G. Carter Stadium; Fort Worth, TX		W 35–31	24,362	
December 4	1:30 pm	No. 7 Louisville	Louisiana Superdome; New Orleans, LA		L 7–55	22,169	
*Non-conference game; ^{†}Homecoming; Rankings from AP Poll released prior to the game; All times are in Central time
