= 2004 Houston Cougars football team =

American college football season

2004 Houston Cougars football
- Conference: Conference USA
- Record: 3–8 (3–5 C-USA)
- Head coach: Art Briles (2nd season)
- Offensive scheme: Veer and shoot
- Defensive coordinator: Ron Harris (2nd season)
- Base defense: 4–3
- Captain: Game captains
- Home stadium: Robertson Stadium

2004 Conference USA football standings
	Conf.			Overall
Team	W		L	W		L
No. 6 Louisville $	8	–	0	11	–	1
Memphis	5	–	3	8	–	4
Southern Miss	5	–	3	7	–	5
Cincinnati	5	–	3	7	–	5
UAB	5	–	3	7	–	5
TCU	3	–	5	5	–	6
Tulane	3	–	5	5	–	6
South Florida	3	–	5	4	–	7
Houston	3	–	5	3	–	8
East Carolina	2	–	6	2	–	9
Army	2	–	6	2	–	9
$ – Conference champion; Rankings from AP Poll

The 2004 Houston Cougars football team represented the University of Houston as a member of Conference USA (C-USA) during the 2004 NCAA Division I-A football season.

Led by second-year head coach Art Briles, the Cougars compiled an overall record of 3–8 with a mark of 3–5 in conference play, placing in a four-way tie for sixth in C-USA. The team played home games on campus, at Robertson Stadium in Houston.

== Schedule ==
Date	Time	Opponent	Site	TV	Result	Attendance	Source
September 5	4:00 pm	vs. Rice*	Reliant Stadium; Houston, TX (rivalry)		L 7–10	28,726	
September 11	6:00 pm	at No. 2 Oklahoma*	Gaylord Family Oklahoma Memorial Stadium; Norman, OK	TBS	L 13–63	84,280	
September 18	7:00 pm	Army	Robertson Stadium; Houston, TX		W 35–21	18,687	
September 23	6:45 pm	No. 4 Miami (FL)*	Reliant Stadium; Houston, TX	ESPN	L 13–38	36,698	
October 2	1:00 pm	at Memphis	Liberty Bowl Memorial Stadium; Memphis, TN		L 14–41	35,297	
October 7	6:00 pm	at Southern Miss	M. M. Roberts Stadium; Hattiesburg, MS	ESPN2	L 29–35 ^{OT}	28,625	
October 23	6:00 pm	at TCU	Amon G. Carter Stadium; Fort Worth, TX		L 27–34	36,276	
October 30	4:00 pm	Tulane	Robertson Stadium; Houston, TX		W 24–3	17,204	
November 6	4:00 pm	East Carolina^{†}	Robertson Stadium; Houston, TX		W 34–24	13,069	
November 13	3:00 pm	at UAB	Legion Field; Birmingham, AL		L 7–20	13,240	
November 20	4:00 pm	No. 10 Louisville	Robertson Stadium; Houston, TX	ESPN Plus	L 27–65	20,176	
*Non-conference game; ^{†}Homecoming; Rankings from AP Poll released prior to the game; All times are in Central time
