= Todd Berry =

American football coach

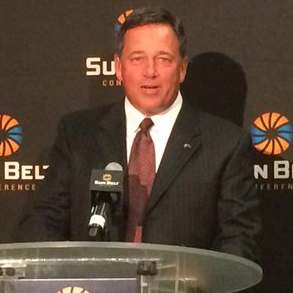
- Berry at the 2015 Sun Belt Media Day

Biographical details
- Born: November 12, 1960 (age 65)

Coaching career (HC unless noted)
- 1983: Tennessee (TE)
- 1984: Tulsa (WR)
- 1985: Oklahoma State (GA)
- 1986–1988: Tennessee–Martin (OC/QB)
- 1989–1990: Mississippi State (WR)
- 1991: SE Missouri State (OC/QB)
- 1992–1995: East Carolina (OC/RB)
- 1996–1999: Illinois State
- 2000–2003: Army
- 2004–2005: Louisiana–Monroe (OC/QB)
- 2006: Miami (FL) (QB)
- 2007–2009: UNLV (AHC/OC/QB)
- 2010–2015: Louisiana–Monroe

Administrative career (AD unless noted)
- 2016–present: AFCA (executive director)

Head coaching record
- Overall: 57–102
- Bowls: 0–1

Accomplishments and honors

Awards
- Sun Belt Coach of the Year (2012)

Todd Berry (born November 12, 1960) is an American former college football coach. He served the head football coach at the Illinois State University from 1996 to 1999, the United States Military Academy from 2000 to 2003, and the University of Louisiana at Monroe from 2010 until his firing during the 2015 season, compiling a career head coach record of 57–102. Since 2016, Berry has been the executive director of the American Football Coaches Association (AFCA). He is the son of Reuben Berry, who was head football coach at Sterling College in Sterling, Kansas and Missouri Southern State University and head coach for the Saskatchewan Roughriders of the Canadian Football League (CFL).

== Head coaching career ==
=== Illinois State ===
Berry was the 19th head football coach at Illinois State University in Normal, Illinois, serving for seasons, from 1996 to 1999, and compiling a record of 24–24.

=== Army ===
Berry was named the 32nd head football coach at the United States Military Academy in West Point, New York, beginning in the 2000 season. In 2003, he was fired after an 0–6 start, and the team finished the season with an 0–13 record. Berry has the lowest winning percentage of any Army head coach who served as head coach for more than six games.

=== Louisiana–Monroe ===
Berry was the offensive coordinator for the University of Louisiana at Monroe from 2004 to 2005 under head coach Charlie Weatherbie. He returned Louisiana–Monroe as head football coach in 2010. Berry was fired by Louisiana–Monroe on November 14, 2015.

== Head coaching record ==
Year	Team	Overall	Conference	Standing	Bowl/playoffs	TSN^{#}
Illinois State Redbirds (Missouri Valley Football Conference) (1996–1999)
1996	Illinois State	3–8	0–5	6th		
1997	Illinois State	2–9	0–6	7th		
1998	Illinois State	8–4	4–2	2nd	L NCAA Division I-AA First Round	16
1999	Illinois State	11–3	6–0	1st	L NCAA Division I-AA Semifinal	3
Illinois State:		24–24	10–13			
Army Black Knights (Conference USA) (2000–2003)
2000	Army	1–10	1–6	9th		
2001	Army	3–8	2–5	8th		
2002	Army	1–11	1–7	10th		
2003	Army	0–6 (Note: Berry was fired after the first six games of the 2003 season. John Mumford served as interim head coach for the remaining seven games of the season. Army finished the year with an overall record of 0–13 and a mark of 0–8 in conference play, placing last out of 11 teams in Conference USA.)	0–4			
Army:		5–35	4–22			
Louisiana–Monroe Warhawks (Sun Belt Conference) (2010–2015)
2010	Louisiana–Monroe	5–7	4–4	T–4th		
2011	Louisiana–Monroe	4–8	3–5	6th		
2012	Louisiana–Monroe	8–5	6–2	T–2nd	L Independence	
2013	Louisiana–Monroe	6–6	4–3	T–3rd		
2014	Louisiana–Monroe	4–8	3–5	T–7th		
2015	Louisiana–Monroe	1–9 (Note: Berry was fired on November 14, after the first ten games of the 2015 season. John Mumford served as interim head coach for the remaining three games of the season. Louisiana–Monroe finished the year with an overall record of 2–11 and a mark of 1–7 in conference play, placing last out of 11 teams in the Sun Belt Conference.)	0–6			
Louisiana–Monroe:		28–43	20–25			
Total:		57–102				
National championship Conference title Conference division title or championship game berth
