= Ronnie McAda =

American football player (born 1973)

Profile
- Position: Quarterback

Personal information
- Born: December 6, 1973 (age 52); Irving, Texas, U.S.

Career information
- High school: Mesquite (Mesquite, Texas)
- College: Army
- NFL draft: 1997: 7th round, 240th overall pick

Career history
- 1997–1999: Green Bay Packers
- 2001: Denver Broncos*
- * Offseason or practice squad member only

Ronnie McAda (born December 6, 1973) is an American former college football player who was a quarterback for the Army Black Knights. He was selected with the final pick of the 1997 NFL draft by the Green Bay Packers, thus earning the distinction of being Mr. Irrelevant. In his senior season, he led Army past Navy and to the Independence Bowl. He was the last player drafted in the National Football League (NFL) from the U.S. Military Academy until Caleb Campbell was selected in the 2008 NFL draft by the Detroit Lions.

== Early life ==
As a senior, McAda set a school record for passing yards. That year, he was named the offensive MVP of the district as a senior at Mesquite High School in Mesquite, Texas. In addition to district MVP, he was also named as his team's offensive MVP.

== College career ==
=== 1994 ===
After spending 1993 on the Junior varsity team, McAda played all 11 games in the 1994 season, starting 8 at quarterback.

He began the season as the fourth player on the depth chart at that position. However, due to the injuries to starters Rick Roeper and Mike Makovec, he took over during a game against Temple and remained as starter for the remainder of the season.

=== 1995 ===
Started all 11 games at quarterback. McAda was second on the team in rushing yards with a career season highs 701 yards while passing for 761.

=== 1996 ===
Started 9 games at quarterback, missing two due to a deep bone bruise above his left ankle. Despite this, he still had an impressive statistical showing. McAda passed for a career high of 954 yards and set a team record for single season completion percentage at the time with 63.2%.

In a game against Navy, McAda rushed for a career best 134 yards in a 28-24 victory. McAda finished his career at Army with 2,333 passing yards and 1,703 rushing yards. This sums to 4,036 yards of total offense, good enough for sixth in school history.

						Rush				Rece				Scri			
Year	School	Conf	Class	Pos	G	Att	Yds	Avg	TD	Rec	Yds	Avg	TD	Plays	Yds	Avg	TD
1994	Army	Ind		QB	11	105	543	5.2	2					105	543	5.2	2
1995	Army	Ind		QB	11	154	701	4.6	10					154	701	4.6	10
1996	Army	Ind		QB	11	99	534	5.4	4					99	534	5.4	4
Career	Army					358	1778	5.0	16					358	1778	5.0	16

Provided by CFB at Sports Reference: View Original Table Generated June 4, 2018.
