= 2002 Army Black Knights football team =

American college football season

2002 Army Black Knights football
- Conference: Conference USA
- Record: 1–11 (1–7 C-USA)
- Head coach: Todd Berry (3rd season)
- Offensive coordinator: John Bond (3rd season)
- Offensive scheme: Spread/option
- Defensive coordinator: Dennis Therrell (3rd season)
- Base defense: 4–4
- Captains: Aris Comeaux; Clarence Holmes; Ryan Kent; Alex Moore
- Home stadium: Michie Stadium

2002 Conference USA football standings
	Conf.			Overall
Team	W		L	W		L
Cincinnati +	6	–	2	7	–	7
No. 23 TCU +	6	–	2	10	–	2
Louisville	5	–	3	7	–	6
Southern Miss	5	–	3	7	–	6
Tulane	4	–	4	8	–	5
UAB	4	–	4	5	–	7
East Carolina	4	–	4	4	–	8
Houston	3	–	5	5	–	7
Memphis	2	–	6	3	–	9
Army	1	–	7	1	–	11
+ – Conference co-champions; Rankings from AP Poll

The 2002 Army Black Knights football team was an American football team that represented the United States Military Academy as a member of Conference USA (C-USA) in the 2002 NCAA Division I-A football season. In their third season under head coach Todd Berry, the Black Knights compiled a 1–11 record and were outscored by their opponents by a combined total of 491 to 226. In the annual Army–Navy Game, the Black Knights lost to Navy, 58–12. This loss began a 14-game losing streak by Army against Navy.

== Schedule ==
Date	Time	Opponent	Site	TV	Result	Attendance	Source
September 7		Holy Cross*	Michie Stadium; West Point, NY		L 21–30	28,063	
September 14	7:00 p.m.	at Rutgers*	Rutgers Stadium; Piscataway, NJ	ESPN Plus	L 0–44	28,514	
September 21	1:00 p.m.	Louisville	Michie Stadium; West Point, NY	WDRB	L 14–45	28,625	
September 28	1:00 p.m.	Southern Miss	Michie Stadium; West Point, NY		L 6–27	31,402	
October 5	2:00 p.m.	at East Carolina	Dowdy–Ficklen Stadium; Greenville, NC		L 24–59	38,111	
October 12	6:00 p.m.	TCU	Michie Stadium; West Point, NY		L 27–46	32,454	
October 19	3:00 p.m.	at Houston	Robertson Stadium; Houston, TX		L 42–56	16,469	
October 26	12:00 p.m.	UAB	Michie Stadium; West Point, NY		L 26–29	35,804	
November 9	1:00 p.m.	Air Force*	Michie Stadium; West Point, NY (Commander-in-Chief's Trophy)	ESPN Plus	L 30–49	39,288	
November 16	3:30 p.m.	at Tulane	Louisiana Superdome; New Orleans, LA		W 14–10	19,421	
November 23	2:00 p.m.	at Memphis	Liberty Bowl Memorial Stadium; Memphis, TN		L 10–38	20,906	
December 1		vs. Navy*	Giants Stadium; East Rutherford, NJ (Army–Navy Game)		L 12–58		
*Non-conference game; All times are in Eastern time

== Roster ==
2002 Army Black Knights football team roster
Players
Coaches
Offense

Pos.	#	Name	Class
QB	5	Reggie Nevels	So
QB	8	Zac Dahman	Fr
WR	9	Aris Comeaux	Sr
RB	28	Josh Holden	Sr
TE	48	Warren Stewart	Sr
C	53	Mike Hastings	Sr
G	61	Steve Schmidt	Sr
G	70	Aaron Burger	Sr
OT	79	Craig Cunningham	Sr

Defense

Pos.	#	Name	Class
DB	1	Maurio Smith	Sr
LB	43	Joe Martinez	Sr
LB	46	Michael Lennox	Sr
LB	52	Jason Frazier	Sr
DT	96	Paddy Heiliger	Sr
DE	97	Keenan Beasley	So
DE	98	Will Sullivan	So
DL	99	Clarence Holmes	Sr

Special teams

Pos.	#	Name	Class
P	47	Chris Castelli	Sr

Head coach

- Todd Berry

Coordinators/assistant coaches

Legend

- (C) Team captain
- (S) Suspended
- (I) Ineligible
- Injured
- Redshirt

Roster
