= Dan Foldberg =

American football player and military officer (1928–2002)

Profile
- Position: End

Personal information
- Listed height: 6 ft 1 in (1.85 m)
- Listed weight: 185 lb (84 kg)

Career information
- College: Army
- NFL draft: 1951: 22nd round, 261st overall pick

Awards and highlights
- Unanimous All-American (1950); First-team All-American (1949); Second-team All-American (1948); 2× First-team All-Eastern (1949, 1950); Second-team All-Eastern (1948); 1951 USILA second-team All-American (lacrosse)

John Daniel Foldberg (April 22, 1928 – May 30, 2002) was an American military officer and football player. He played as an end for the Army Cadets at the United States Military Academy. Army head coach Earl Blaik rated him the best end he had ever coached. He was selected in the 1951 NFL draft, but pursued a 27-year military career. Foldberg served as an infantry officer in the Korean and Vietnam Wars.

== Early life ==
John Daniel Foldberg was born in Texas on April 22, 1928. He attended Sunset High School in Dallas, Texas, where he played basketball as part of the 1944 state championship team. His older brother, Hank, played football at Texas A&M before transferring to West Point where he was named a consensus All-American in 1946, and graduated from West Point in 1947.

== West Point ==
Like his brother, Dan Foldberg also attended the United States Military Academy in West Point, New York. He played football there as an end, and during the 1948 season, Foldberg was described as a consistently impressive player on what was a dominating Army team. The Cadets' only close game that year was a 14–13 victory over Penn. One source described the Army team as "the nearest thing to a paragon of perfection in the East." That same year, Foldberg was named a United Press second-team All-American. For his senior year in 1950, Foldberg returned as the Cadet's only starting offensive lineman and was named the team captain. That year, he was named a first-team All-American by unanimous consensus.

During the 1950 season, legendary Army head coach Earl Blaik called Foldberg the best end he had ever coach. Foldberg finished eighth in the vote for the Heisman Trophy, which is awarded annually to college football's most outstanding player. Foldberg was invited to participate in the 1950 Blue–Gray Classic all-star game, where he served as the captain of the Rebel squad.

Foldberg also played on the Army lacrosse team as a defenseman. The United States Intercollegiate Lacrosse Association (USILA), the college sport's governing body, named him a second-team All-American as senior in 1951. Foldberg graduated from West Point as a member of the Class of 1951.

== Military career ==
Foldberg was selected in the 22nd round of the 1951 NFL draft by the Detroit Lions as the 261st overall pick, but remained in the Army as a career officer. He received his commission into the Infantry branch, and served in the 15th Infantry in the Korean War from 1952 to 1953. Foldberg was then assigned as cadre at Ranger School, from 1954 to 1956, and Airborne School, from 1956 to 1958. He returned to West Point to work as a tac officer from 1965 to 1967. Between 1967 and 1968, he served as the executive officer of 3rd Brigade, 101st Airborne Division, and the commanding officer of 1/501st Infantry, 101st Airborne Division. In the Republic of Viet Nam, he served as a battalion commander and the G3 operations officer in the 5th Infantry Division, and he was awarded the Silver Star, Bronze Star, and the Purple Heart. In 1978, having attained the rank of colonel, Foldberg retired from the military to Tulsa, Oklahoma.

== Death ==
Dan Foldberg died on May 30, 2002, at the age of 74.
