= Caleb Campbell =

American football player (born 1984)

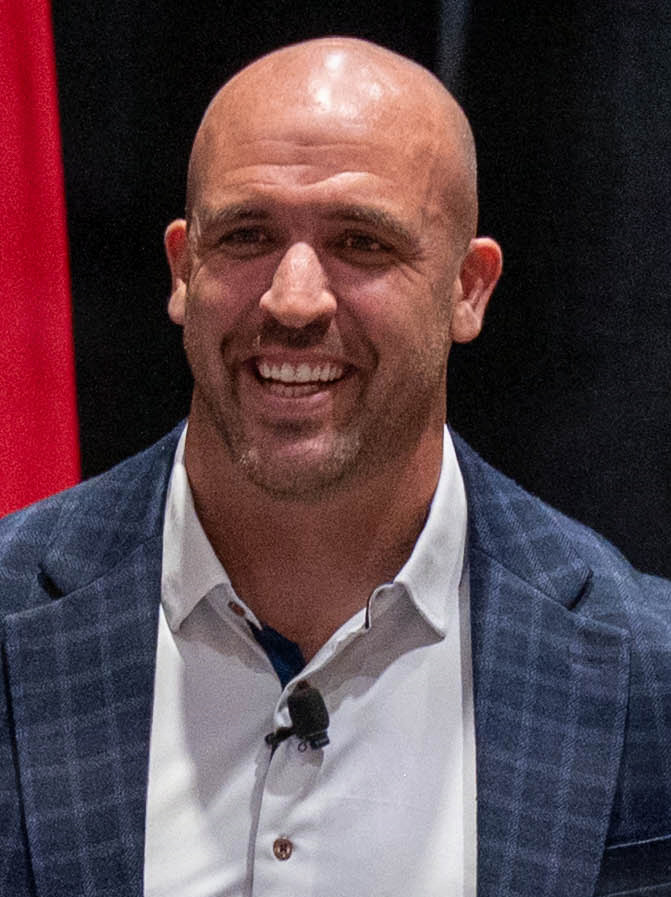
- Campbell in 2026

No. 53
- Position: Linebacker

Personal information
- Born: September 14, 1984 (age 42); Perryton, Texas, U.S.
- Listed height: 6 ft 2 in (1.88 m)
- Listed weight: 237 lb (108 kg)

Career information
- High school: Perryton
- College: Army
- NFL draft: 2008: 7th round, 218th overall pick

Career history
- Detroit Lions (2010); Indianapolis Colts (2011)*; Kansas City Chiefs (2011–2012)*
- * Offseason or practice squad member only

Awards and highlights
- All-Conference USA All-Freshman (2004)
- Stats at Pro Football Reference

Caleb Matthew Campbell (born September 14, 1984) is an American former professional football player who was a linebacker in the National Football League (NFL). He is also a lieutenant in the United States Army. He was selected by the Detroit Lions in the seventh round of the 2008 NFL draft. He played college football for the Army Black Knights.

He was also a member of the Indianapolis Colts and Kansas City Chiefs.

== Early life ==
Campbell attended Perryton High School where he lettered three times in football. He earned four additional letters in basketball and three in track and field. He also served as a team captain for the football team as a senior. In football, he played both quarterback and free safety. He was named Amarillo Globe-News 3A "Player of the Year." He also received All-State honors during his junior and senior years. He was an All-State selection on both offense and defense. He was a two-time All-Conference selection. He was also an All-District selection as well. He earned First-team All-League honors at both positions as a senior. He rushed for 950 yards and 15 touchdowns during senior season. He also passed for seven touchdowns. He recorded 32 tackles, four forced fumbles, five pass breakups and one interception on defense. He was a sprinter on the track team. He also played Guard on the basketball team. He was selected as a team captain in basketball as a senior. He was also active in a local church youth group. He was also listed in Who's Who Among American High School Students. He also served as teacher's aid for a local elementary school.

== College career ==
Campbell first attended the United States Military Academy Preparatory School for one year before entering West Point. While there, he majored in Latin American Studies.

In 2004, Campbell played in all 11 games. He was named to the C-USA All-Freshman Team. He moved into the starting lineup during midseason and remained there. He started the final six games at the "whip" position. His first career start came an away game against USF. He ranked fifth on the team with 54 tackles. He tied for second on the team with two forced fumbles. He recorded 48 tackles over the final seven games. He recorded four tackles for loss, including a half of a sack. He recorded a then-career-high 12 tackles against UAB in the home finale. He was also one of seven freshmen to earn a varsity letter.

In 2005, Campbell started all 11 games. He led the team with 97 tackles. He also shared the team MVP honors with running back Carlton Jones. Campbell was credited with 63 solo tackles. He led the team with five interceptions. He also ranked ninth nationally in interceptions. His interception total stands as highest by an Army player since Kenny Dale Rowland recorded five interceptions in 1998.

In 2006, Campbell was a starter for each of season's first nine games. He was the starting Strong safety before suffering a season-ending knee injury in a road game against Tulane. He ranked third on the team in tackles with 59 at the time of the injury. He ended the year fourth despite missing the season's final three games. He was credited with 30 solo tackles. He recorded two tackles for loss, two pass breakups, one forced fumble and one interception as well. He also recorded at least nine tackles on three occasions. During the season opener he finished with three tackles at Arkansas State while battling an illness throughout the game.

In 2007, Campbell was named to preseason watch list for the Lott Trophy, that is awarded to the nation's defensive player of the year. He was also on the preseason watch list for the award heading into junior campaign as well. He missed all of the 2007 spring practice recovering from a knee injury. He was selected one of team's captains for his senior season, along with Tony Fusco, Jeremy Trimble and Mike Viti.

For the season, Campbell finished second on the team on defense. He played in and started all 12 games of the season. He recorded 97 total tackles (68 solo), two tackles for loss, three forced fumbles and one fumble recovery. He also had two pass break ups, and two passes defensed.

Campbell became the 22nd Army player to perform in the East-West Shrine Game.

=== Honors ===
Campbell was named to ECAC Division I-A Football All-Star team in 2005. He holds seven career double-digit tackle games. He appeared in 31 consecutive games before suffering a season-ending knee injury against Tulane in 2006.

=== Military future ===
Due to a newly implemented rule at the U.S. Military Academy that would change the way cadets are selected in the NFL draft, Campbell was able to pursue a professional football career.

The rule states:

Cadets accepted into the program, "will owe two years of active service in the Army, during which time they will be allowed to play their sport in the player-development systems of their respective organizations and be assigned to recruiting stations. If they remain in professional sports following those two years, they will be provided the option of buying out the remaining three years of their active-duty commitment in exchange for six years of reserve time."

Campbell is the first Army player to be selected in the NFL Draft since quarterback Ronnie McAda was the final pick in the 1997 NFL draft by the Green Bay Packers.

The rule, known as the "Alternative Service Option", or ASO, has since been suspended after undergoing review by the Department of the Army. All players not under contract had to return to their active-duty station. Since Campbell and Mike Viti of the Buffalo Bills were under contract, they were tentatively authorized to play with their respective teams with the provision that if cut, they would have to return to their active duty station and not be able to sign with another team. The Army dropped the ASO option on July 8, meaning that both players had to serve two years of their active duty commitment before they can petition for early release. Campbell, however, was not informed until July 22, after reporting to the Lions training camp. He chose Air Defense Artillery (ADA) as his duty branch, but served on the coaching staff at the Army Prep School.

== Professional career ==
=== Pre-draft ===
Campbell was invited to the 2008 NFL Combine, where he ran the 40-yard dash in 4.56 seconds. On April 26, 2008, Campbell, along with punter Owen Tolson, were featured in an interview piece on CNN's Headline News. The piece featured interviews with both players and Army football head coach Stan Brock. It focused on the NFL prospects of the two, both of whom participated in the NFL Scouting Combine in Indianapolis in March 2008. In addition, the two players discussed the Department of the Army's alternative service option plan which would allow them to play in the NFL in 2008. The CNN Headline News piece was the second national story about Army players' NFL chances that week. ESPN's E:60 profiled Campbell.

=== Detroit Lions ===
Campbell was selected in the seventh round (218th overall) of the 2008 NFL draft by the Detroit Lions. Campbell, who was in attendance on the second day of the draft, was featured several times. He was interviewed by the ESPN broadcasters, and asked about his opinion on the "service option" rule that allowed him and teammate Owen Tolson to enter the NFL Draft upon graduation. While being interviewed, and before teams made their seventh round draft selection, fans could be heard chanting "Ca-leb Camp-bell" or "US...USA" in support of Campbell. Upon his selection by the Lions, Campbell received a standing ovation by the fans in attendance as well as numerous chants and cheers.

On July 22, 2008, Campbell agreed to terms on a three-year contract with the Lions. However, he did not have a chance to sign the contract and the following day the Army ordered him to serve his military service time, preventing him from playing football until at least 2010. Being an unsigned draft pick in 2008, Campbell became an unrestricted free agent in 2009, but was then serving military time.

On March 11, 2010, it had been reported that Campbell has been offered a one-year contract with the Lions after working out for them. Campbell officially re-joined the Lions on April 29, 2010. He did not make the final roster, however, as the Lions cut him on September 5, 2010.

On September 6, 2010, the Lions announced that Campbell had been placed on its practice squad. On November 20, 2010, the Lions signed Campbell to the active roster. According to the NFL website, during the 2010 season Campbell participated in three games and had a total of three tackles (two solo & one assist).

Campbell was waived during final cuts on September 3, 2011.

=== Indianapolis Colts ===
On September 14, 2011, Campbell was signed to the practice squad of the Indianapolis Colts. Campbell was released on September 28.

=== Kansas City Chiefs ===
The Kansas City Chiefs signed him to their practice squad on November 15, 2011. He was released by the Chiefs on August 26, 2012.

== Family ==
Campbell's parents are Gregg and Stephanie Campbell. His older brother, Jacob, has been a professional bull rider. His younger brother, Jeremy, has a prosthetic leg, yet still played quarterback on his high school football team. Jeremy Campbell participated in the Paralympic Games in track in 2006, and remains a member of the U.S. national team. He won gold in the pentathlon and discus throw at the Beijing 2008 Paralympic Games.
