= John Mumford (American football) =

American football player and coach (born 1956)

Biographical details
- Born: December 25, 1956 (age 69); Lawrence, Kansas, U.S.

Playing career
- 1976–1978: Pittsburg State
- Position: Tight end

Coaching career (HC unless noted)
- 1980–1981: Kansas (GA)
- 1982: South Dakota (DL)
- 1983–1985: South Dakota (ILB)
- 1986–1989: South Dakota (DC)
- 1990–1999: Southeast Missouri State
- 2000–2003: Army (DL)
- 2003: Army (interim HC)
- 2004–2008: Army (DC)
- 2009–2014: Army (DE)
- 2014–2015: Louisiana–Monroe (DL)
- 2015: Louisiana–Monroe (interim HC)
- 2016: Pope John Paul II Catholic HS (AL)
- 2017–2022: New Mexico State (DL)

Head coaching record
- Overall: 41–79 (college)

Accomplishments and honors

Awards
- OVC Coach of the Year (1994)

John David Mumford (born December 25, 1956) is an American football coach and former player. He was most recently the defensive line coach at New Mexico State University. Mumford served as the head football coach at Southeast Missouri State University from 1990 to 1999, as the interim head football coach at the United States Military Academy for seven games in 2003, and as the interim head football coach at the University of Louisiana at Monroe for three games in 2015.

== Head coaching record ==
=== College ===
Year	Team	Overall	Conference	Standing	Bowl/playoffs
Southeast Missouri State Indians (Missouri Intercollegiate Athletic Association) (1990)
1990	Southeast Missouri State	7–3	7–2	3rd	
Southeast Missouri State Indians (Ohio Valley Conference) (1991–1999)
1991	Southeast Missouri State	3–8	3–4	T–3rd	
1992	Southeast Missouri State	2–9	2–6	T–6th	
1993	Southeast Missouri State	3–8	2–6	T–7th	
1994	Southeast Missouri State	7–5	5–3	3rd	
1995	Southeast Missouri State	5–6	5–3	4th	
1996	Southeast Missouri State	3–8	3–5	T–6th	
1997	Southeast Missouri State	4–7	1–6	7th	
1998	Southeast Missouri State	3–8	2–5	T–6th	
1999	Southeast Missouri State	3–8	2–5	T–6th	
Southeast Missouri State:		40–70	31–45		
Army Black Knights (Conference USA) (2003)
2003	Army	0–7 (Note: Todd Berry served as head coach the first six games of the 2003 season before being fired. Mumford was appointed interim head coach for the remainder of the season. Army finished the year with an overall record of 0–13 and a mark of 0–8 in conference play.)	0–4	11th	
Army:		0–7	0–4		
Louisiana–Monroe Warhawks (Sun Belt Conference) (2015)
2015	Louisiana–Monroe	1–2 (Note: Todd Berry served as head coach the first ten games of the 2014 season before being fired. Mumford was appointed interim head coach for the remainder of the season. Louisiana–Monroe finished the year with an overall record of 2–11 and a mark of 1–7 in conference play.)	1–1	11th	
Louisiana–Monroe:		1–2	1–1		
Total:		41–79			
