= 2004 Nevada Wolf Pack football team =

American college football season

2004 Nevada Wolf Pack football
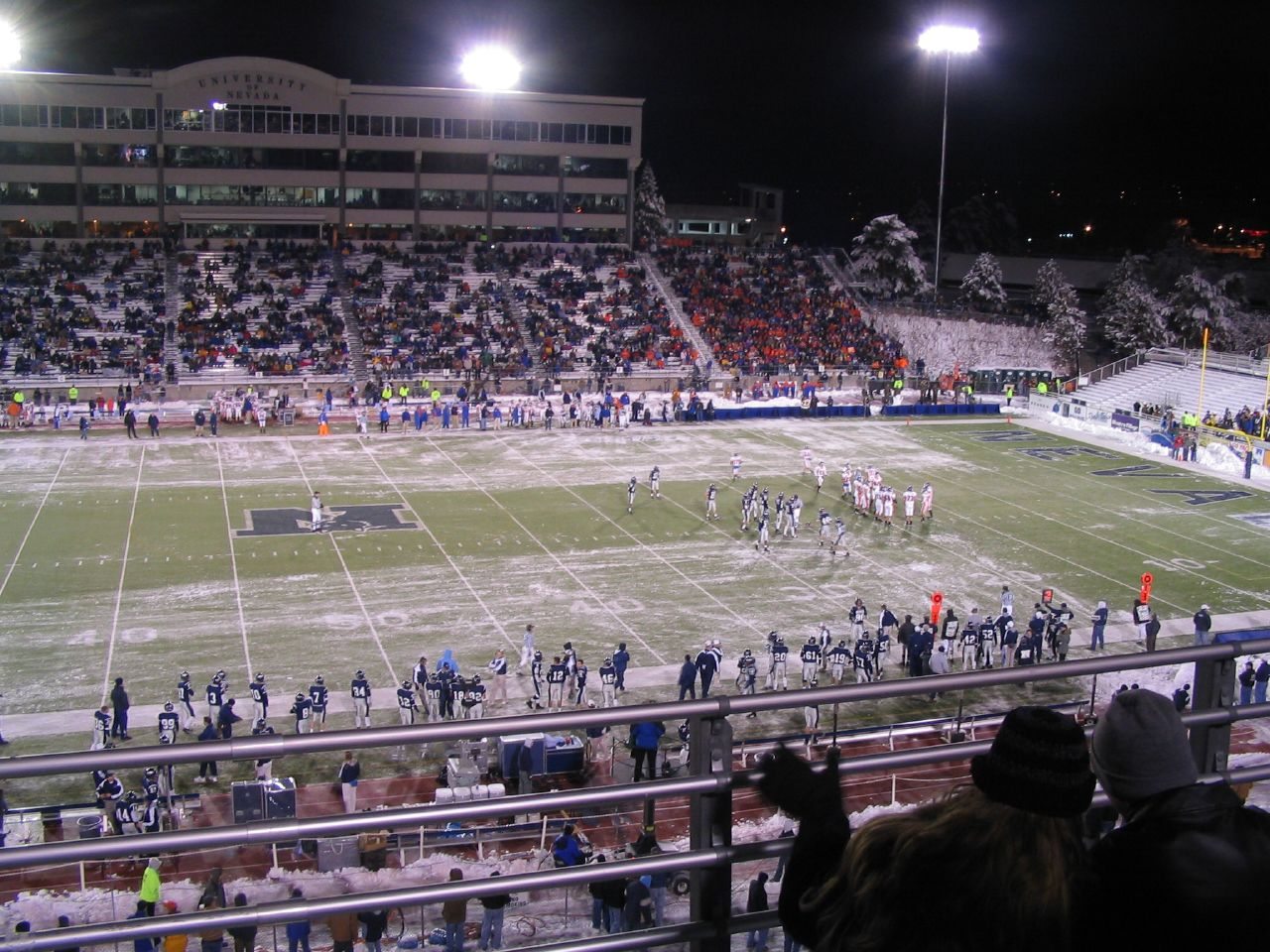
- Nevada on the field vs. Boise State on November 27 at Mackay Stadium
- Conference: Western Athletic Conference
- Record: 5–7 (3–5 WAC)
- Head coach: Chris Ault (20th season)
- Offensive coordinator: Chris Klenakis (4th season)
- Offensive scheme: Pistol
- Co-defensive coordinators: Dave Fipp (1st season); Barry Sacks (1st season)
- Base defense: 3–4
- Home stadium: Mackay Stadium

2004 Western Athletic Conference football standings
	Conf.			Overall
Team	W		L	W		L
No. 12 Boise State $	8	–	0	11	–	1
UTEP	6	–	2	8	–	4
No. 22 Fresno State	5	–	3	9	–	3
Louisiana Tech	5	–	3	6	–	6
Hawaii	4	–	4	8	–	5
Nevada	3	–	5	5	–	7
Tulsa	3	–	5	4	–	8
SMU	3	–	5	3	–	8
Rice	2	–	6	3	–	8
San Jose State	1	–	7	2	–	9
$ – Conference champion; Rankings from AP Poll

The 2004 Nevada Wolf Pack football team represented the University of Nevada, Reno during the 2004 NCAA Division I-A football season. Nevada competed as a member of the Western Athletic Conference (WAC). The Wolf Pack were led by Chris Ault in his 20th overall and 1st straight season since taking over as head coach for the third time. They played their home games at Mackay Stadium.

== Schedule ==
Date	Time	Opponent	Site	TV	Result	Attendance
September 6	10:00 a.m.	at Louisiana Tech	Joe Aillet Stadium; Ruston, LA	ESPN2	L 21–38	21,127
September 11	1:00 p.m.	Sacramento State*	Mackay Stadium; Reno, NV		W 59–7	16,611
September 18	6:00 p.m.	Buffalo*	Mackay Stadium; Reno, NV		W 38–13	17,220
September 25	6:00 p.m.	at San Diego State*	Qualcomm Stadium; San Diego, CA	Charter	L 10–27	33,429
October 2	7:00 p.m.	at UNLV*	Sam Boyd Stadium; Whitney, NV (Fremont Cannon)	Charter	L 13–48	27,596
October 9	9:00 p.m.	at Hawaii	Aloha Stadium; Halawa, HI	Charter	L 26–48	35,078
October 16	6:00 p.m.	Rice^{†}	Mackay Stadium; Reno, NV		W 35–10	18,800
October 23	6:00 p.m.	Tulsa	Mackay Stadium; Reno, NV		W 54–48 ^{3OT}	13,550
November 6	6:00 p.m.	San Jose State	Mackay Stadium; Reno, NV	Charter	W 42–24	15,902
November 13	3:00 p.m.	at SMU	Gerald J. Ford Stadium; University Park, TX	Charter	L 20–38	10,206
November 20	6:00 p.m.	at Fresno State	Bulldog Stadium; Fresno, CA	Charter	L 17–54	39,256
November 27	4:30 p.m.	No. 10 Boise State	Mackay Stadium; Reno, NV (rivalry)	ESPN	L 21–58	21,799
*Non-conference game; ^{†}Homecoming; Rankings from AP Poll released prior to the game; All times are in Pacific time

== Game summaries ==
=== At Louisiana Tech ===
Nevada at Louisiana Tech

Team	1	2	3	4	Total
Wolf Pack	0	0	7	14	21
• Bulldogs	7	14	10	7	38

- Date: September 6, 2004
- Location: Joe Aillet Stadium
  Ruston, LA
- Game start: 12:08 p.m. CDT
- Elapsed time: 3 hours and 4 minutes
- Game attendance: 21,127
- Game weather: Temperature: 88 °F (31 °C) • Weather: Partly Cloudy • Wind: N 5 MPH
- Referee: Paul Labenne
- TV announcers (ESPN2): Pam Ward, Mike Tomczak and Dave Ryan (sideline)

Scoring summary
1	09:46	LATECH	Ryan Moats 12–yard run (Brad Oestriecher kick)	LATECH 7–0
2	06:10	LATECH	Ryan Moats 3–yard run (Brad Oestriecher kick)	LATECH 14–0
2	02:23	LATECH	Donald Allen 3–yard run (Brad Oestriecher kick)	LATECH 21–0
3	14:11	NEV	Caleb Spencer 11–yard pass from Jeff Rowe (Damon Fine kick)	LATECH 21–7
3	11:13	LATECH	Brad Oestriecher 36–yard field goal	LATECH 24–7
3	08:16	LATECH	Ryan Moats 45–yard run (Brad Oestriecher kick)	LATECH 31–7
4	13:32	NEV	Dell McGee 11–yard pass from Jeff Rowe (Damon Fine kick)	LATECH 31–14
4	05:16	LATECH	Danny Wilson 20–yard run (Brad Oestriecher kick)	LATECH 38–14
4	01:58	NEV	Talib Wise 22–yard pass from Travis Moore (Damon Fine kick)	LATECH 38–21

=== Sacramento State ===
Sacramento State at Nevada

Team	1	2	3	4	Total
Hornets	0	0	0	7	7
• Wolf Pack	7	21	17	14	59

- Date: September 11, 2004
- Location: Mackay Stadium
  Reno, NV
- Game start: 1:05 p.m. PDT
- Elapsed time: N/A
- Game attendance: 16,611
- Game weather: N/A
- Referee: Daniel Romeo
- TV announcers (None): None

Scoring summary
1	01:05	NEV	Adam Kiefer 0–yard fumble recovery (Damon Fine kick)	NEV 7–0
2	08:23	NEV	Tony Moll 4–yard pass from Jeff Rowe (Damon Fine kick)	NEV 14–0
2	01:44	NEV	Jeff Rowe 11–yard run (Damon Fine kick)	NEV 21–0
2	00:09	NEV	Caleb Spencer 6–yard pass from Jeff Rowe (Damon Fine kick)	NEV 28–0
3	11:25	NEV	Damon Fine 44–yard field goal	NEV 31–0
3	06:02	NEV	Jeff Rowe 4–yard run (Damon Fine kick)	NEV 38–0
3	00:21	NEV	Dell McGee 12–yard pass from Travis Moore (Damon Fine kick)	NEV 45–0
4	13:15	NEV	Drew Robinson 25–yard run (Damon Fine kick)	NEV 52–0
4	06:40	NEV	B.J. Mitchell 7–yard run (Damon Fine kick)	NEV 59–0
4	02:13	SAC	Mel Cuckovich 39–yard pass from Brad Tredway (Juan Gamboa kick)	NEV 59–7

=== Buffalo ===
Buffalo at Nevada

Team	1	2	3	4	Total
Bulls	7	0	6	0	13
• Wolf Pack	0	14	7	17	38

- Date: September 18, 2004
- Location: Mackay Stadium
  Reno, NV
- Game start: 6:05 p.m. PDT
- Elapsed time: 3 hours and 3 minutes
- Game attendance: 17,220
- Game weather: Temperature: 60 °F (16 °C) • Weather: Cool and Cloudy • Wind: SW 10–15 MPH
- Referee: Donald Amicon
- TV announcers (None): None

Scoring summary
1	03:57	UB	Jared Patterson 8–yard run (Michael Baker kick)	UB 7–0
2	07:07	NEV	Nichiren Flowers 41–yard pass from Jeff Rowe (Damon Fine kick)	TIE 7–7
2	03:03	NEV	Nichiren Flowers 51–yard pass from Jeff Rowe (Damon Fine kick)	NEV 14–7
3	12:30	UB	Michael Baker 28–yard field goal	NEV 14–10
3	06:56	UB	Michael Baker 47–yard field goal	NEV 14–13
3	02:29	NEV	Chance Kretschmer 1–yard run (Damon Fine kick)	NEV 21–13
4	03:25	NEV	Damon Fine 19–yard field goal	NEV 24–13
4	02:23	NEV	Jeff Rowe 6–yard run (Damon Fine kick)	NEV 31–13
4	01:20	NEV	Drew Robinson 18–yard run (Damon Fine kick)	NEV 38–13

=== At San Diego State ===
Nevada at San Diego State

Team	1	2	3	4	Total
Wolf Pack	0	3	0	7	10
• Aztecs	14	3	0	10	27

- Date: September 25, 2004
- Location: Qualcomm Stadium
  San Diego, CA
- Game start: 6:08 p.m. PDT
- Elapsed time: 3 hours and 31 minutes
- Game attendance: 33,429
- Game weather: Temperature: 73 °F (23 °C) • Weather: Clear and Mild • Wind: WNW 12 MPH
- Referee: Terry Leyden
- TV announcers (Charter): N/A

Scoring summary
1	06:53	SDSU	Jeff Webb 23–yard pass from Matt Dlugolecki (Garrett Palmer kick)	SDSU 7–0
1	00:00	SDSU	Brandon Bornes 35–yard run (Garrett Palmer kick)	SDSU 14–0
2	06:06	NEV	Damon Fine 28–yard field goal	SDSU 14–3
2	03:33	SDSU	Garrett Palmer 50–yard field goal	SDSU 17–3
4	09:30	SDSU	Ramal Porter 19–yard pass from Matt Dlugolecki (Garrett Palmer kick)	SDSU 24–3
4	03:38	SDSU	Garrett Palmer 43–yard field goal	SDSU 27–3
4	00:53	NEV	Chance Kretschmer 3–yard run (Damon Fine kick)	SDSU 27–10

=== At UNLV ===
Nevada at UNLV
(Battle for the Fremont Cannon)

Team	1	2	3	4	Total
Wolf Pack	3	3	0	7	13
• Rebels	3	10	7	28	48

- Date: October 2, 2004
- Location: Sam Boyd Stadium
  Whitney, NV
- Game start: 7:07 p.m. PDT
- Elapsed time: 3 hours and 26 minutes
- Game attendance: 27,596
- Game weather: Temperature: 84 °F (29 °C) • Weather: Clear • Wind: 0 MPH
- Referee: Frank White
- TV announcers (Charter): N/A

Scoring summary
1	07:41	NEV	Damon Fine 41–yard field goal	NEV 3–0
1	01:31	UNLV	Sergio Aguayo 20–yard field goal	TIE 3–3
2	10:08	UNLV	Sergio Aguayo 41–yard field goal	UNLV 6–3
2	04:03	NEV	Damon Fine 37–yard field goal	TIE 6–6
2	01:49	UNLV	Earvin Johnson 11–yard pass from Kurt Nantkes (Sergio Aguayo kick)	UNLV 13–6
3	08:41	UNLV	Dyante Perkins 1–yard run (Sergio Aguayo kick)	UNLV 20–6
4	12:51	UNLV	Dyante Perkins 1–yard run (Sergio Aguayo kick)	UNLV 27–6
4	07:12	UNLV	Earvin Johnson 15–yard pass from Kurt Nantkes (Sergio Aguayo kick)	UNLV 34–6
4	06:44	UNLV	Erick Jackson 5–yard run (Sergio Aguayo kick)	UNLV 41–6
4	05:36	UNLV	Erick Jackson 2–yard run (Hubi Zumkley Schulze kick)	UNLV 48–6
4	02:11	NEV	Nichiren Flowers 3–yard pass from Jeff Rowe (Damon Fine kick)	UNLV 48–13

=== At Hawaii ===
Nevada at Hawaii

Team	1	2	3	4	Total
Wolf Pack	10	3	0	13	26
• Warriors	14	10	17	7	48

- Date: October 9, 2004
- Location: Aloha Stadium
  Halawa, HI
- Game start: 6:07 p.m.
- Elapsed time: 3 hours and 20 minutes
- Game attendance: 35,078
- Game weather: Temperature: 81 °F (27 °C) • Weather: Partly Cloudy • Wind: TR 10–15 MPH
- Referee: Bill Athan
- TV announcers (Charter): N/A

Scoring summary
1	13:07	UH	Chad Owens 12–yard pass from Timmy Chang (Justin Ayat kick)	UH 7–0
1	07:45	NEV	Chance Kretschmer 1–yard run (Damon Fine kick)	TIE 7–7
1	06:33	UH	Chad Owens 13–yard pass from Timmy Chang (Justin Ayat kick)	UH 14–7
1	01:47	NEV	Damon Fine 26–yard field goal	UH 14–10
2	11:38	UH	West Keliikipi 2–yard run (Justin Ayat kick)	UH 21–10
2	09:40	UH	Justin Ayat 40–yard field goal	UH 24–10
2	05:22	NEV	Damon Fine 23–yard field goal	UH 24–13
3	10:49	UH	Justin Ayat 43–yard field goal	UH 27–13
3	02:43	UH	Chad Owens 75–yard punt return (Justin Ayat kick)	UH 34–13
3	01:16	UH	Uriah Moenoa 1–yard pass from Timmy Chang (Justin Ayat kick)	UH 41–13
4	11:30	NEV	Talib Wise 1–yard run (Damon Fine kick blocked)	UH 41–19
4	04:49	NEV	Talib Wise 24–yard pass from Travis Moore (Damon Fine kick)	UH 41–26
4	02:17	UH	Bryan Maneafaiga 6–yard run (Justin Ayat kick)	UH 48–26

=== Rice ===
Rice at Nevada

Team	1	2	3	4	Total
Owls	3	0	0	7	10
• Wolf Pack	14	7	0	14	35

- Date: October 16, 2004
- Location: Mackay Stadium
  Reno, NV
- Game start: 6:05 p.m. PDT
- Elapsed time: 2 hours and 59 minutes
- Game attendance: 18,800
- Game weather: Temperature: 71 °F (22 °C) • Weather: Smokey Sky • Wind: 20 MPH
- Referee: Daniel Romeo
- TV announcers (None): None

Scoring summary
1	06:16	NEV	Chance Kretschmer 17–yard run (Damon Fine kick)	NEV 7–0
1	05:06	NEV	Nichiren Flowers 20–yard pass from Jeff Rowe (Damon Fine kick)	NEV 14–0
1	00:00	RICE	Brennan Landry 34–yard field goal	NEV 14–3
2	10:44	NEV	B.J. Mitchell 9–yard run (Damon Fine kick)	NEV 21–3
4	08:24	NEV	B.J. Mitchell 2–yard run (Damon Fine kick)	NEV 28–3
4	04:36	RICE	Joel Armstrong 13–yard run (Brennan Landry kick)	NEV 28–10
4	00:09	NEV	B.J. Mitchell 7–yard run (Damon Fine kick)	NEV 35–10

=== Tulsa ===
Tulsa at Nevada

Team	1	2	3	4	OT	Total
Golden Hurricane	6	7	7	21	7	48
• Wolf Pack	0	13	14	14	13	54

- Date: October 23, 2004
- Location: Mackay Stadium
  Reno, NV
- Game start: 6:05 p.m. PDT
- Elapsed time: 3 hours and 51 minutes
- Game attendance: 13,550
- Game weather: Temperature: 54 °F (12 °C) • Weather: Cloudy • Wind: W 7–10 MPH
- Referee: Paul Labenne
- TV announcers (None): None

Scoring summary
1	11:13	TULSA	Brad DeVault 38–yard field goal	TULSA 3–0
1	04:55	TULSA	Brad DeVault 33–yard field goal	TULSA 6–0
2	09:43	NEV	Damon Fine 35–yard field goal	TULSA 6–3
2	06:17	NEV	Damon Fine 22–yard field goal	TIE 6–6
2	05:21	NEV	Nick Hawthrone 30–yard interception (Damon Fine kick)	NEV 13–6
2	01:07	TULSA	Brandon Diles 1–yard run (Brad DeVault kick)	TIE 13–13
3	12:03	TULSA	Brandon Diles 5–yard run (Brad DeVault kick)	TULSA 20–13
3	08:56	NEV	Tony Moll 5–yard pass from Jeff Rowe (Damon Fine kick)	TIE 20–20
3	06:24	NEV	B.J. Mitchell 4–yard run (Damon Fine kick)	NEV 27–20
4	06:03	TULSA	Uril Parrish 1–yard run (Brad DeVault kick)	TIE 27–27
4	02:17	NEV	Chance Kretschmer 5–yard run (Damon Fine kick)	NEV 34–27
4	02:05	TULSA	Ashlan Davis 94–yard kickoff return (Brad DeVault kick)	TIE 34–34
4	00:36	NEV	Chance Kretschmer 18–yard run (Damon Fine kick)	NEV 41–34
4	00:00	TULSA	Caleb Blankenship 16–yard pass from James Kilian (Brad DeVault kick)	TIE 41–41
OT	15:00	NEV	B.J. Mitchell 1–yard run (Damon Fine kick)	NEV 48–41
OT	15:00	TULSA	Brandon Diles 22–yard run (Brad DeVault kick)	TIE 48–48
OT	15:00	NEV	Nichiren Flowers 25–yard pass from Jeff Rowe (rush failed)	NEV 54–48

=== San Jose State ===
San Jose State at Nevada

Team	1	2	3	4	Total
Spartans	0	0	10	14	24
• Wolf Pack	7	7	14	14	42

- Date: November 6, 2004
- Location: Mackay Stadium
  Reno, NV
- Game start: 6:07 p.m. PST
- Elapsed time: 3 hours and 14 minutes
- Game attendance: 15,902
- Game weather: Temperature: 60 °F (16 °C) • Weather: Partly Cloudy • Wind: 1–2 MPH
- Referee: Robert Cameron
- TV announcers (Charter): N/A

Scoring summary
1	01:51	NEV	Caleb Spencer 4–yard pass from Jeff Rowe (Damon Fine kick)	NEV 7–0
2	06:31	NEV	B.J. Mitchell 1–yard run (Damon Fine kick)	NEV 14–0
3	13:00	SJSU	Jeff Carr 39–yard field goal	NEV 14–3
3	09:11	NEV	Caleb Spencer 10–yard pass from Jeff Rowe (Damon Fine kick)	NEV 21–3
3	07:42	SJSU	Lance Martin 3–yard run (Jeff Carr kick)	NEV 21–10
3	04:18	NEV	Chance Kretschmer 5–yard run (Damon Fine kick)	NEV 28–10
4	09:45	NEV	Drew Robinson 1–yard run (Damon Fine kick)	NEV 35–10
4	09:23	SJSU	John Broussard 95–yard kickoff return (Jeff Carr kick)	NEV 35–17
4	05:36	NEV	Drew Robinson 12–yard run (Damon Fine kick)	NEV 42–17
4	02:31	SJSU	Adam Tafralis 2–yard run (Jeff Carr kick)	NEV 42–24

=== At SMU ===
Nevada at SMU

Team	1	2	3	4	Total
Wolf Pack	3	3	14	0	20
• Mustangs	10	0	28	0	38

- Date: November 13, 2004
- Location: Gerald J. Ford Stadium
  University Park, TX
- Game start: 5:07 p.m. CST
- Elapsed time: 3 hours and 18 minutes
- Game attendance: 10,206
- Game weather: Temperature: 54 °F (12 °C) • Weather: Light Rain and 75% Humidity • Wind: NNE 3 MPH
- Referee: Daniel Romeo
- TV announcers (Charter): N/A

Scoring summary
1	10:39	SMU	Cedrick Dorsey 38–yard pass from Tony Eckert (Chris McMurtray kick)	SMU 7–0
1	07:54	NEV	Damon Fine 33–yard field goal	SMU 7–3
1	05:17	SMU	Chris McMurtray 42–yard field goal	SMU 10–3
2	08:58	NEV	Damon Fine 26–yard field goal	SMU 10–6
3	14:03	NEV	Nichiren Flowers 18–yard pass from Jeff Rowe (Damon Fine kick)	NEV 13–10
3	11:24	SMU	Jerad Romo 13–yard run (Chris McMurtray kick)	SMU 17–13
3	09:56	SMU	Foy Munlin 1–yard run (Chris McMurtray kick)	SMU 24–13
3	09:46	SMU	Alvin Nnabuife 17–yard fumble recovery (Chris McMurtray kick)	SMU 31–13
3	03:20	NEV	Talib Wise 40–yard pass from Jeff Rowe (Damon Fine kick)	SMU 31–20
3	01:28	SMU	Alvin Nnabuife 95–yard fumble recovery (Chris McMurtray kick)	SMU 38–20

=== At Fresno State ===
Nevada at Fresno State

Team	1	2	3	4	Total
Wolf Pack	7	3	7	0	17
• Bulldogs	13	20	14	7	54

- Date: November 20, 2004
- Location: Bulldog Stadium
  Fresno, CA
- Game start: 6:15 p.m. PST
- Elapsed time: 3 hours and 9 minutes
- Game attendance: 39,256
- Game weather: Temperature: 54 °F (12 °C) • Weather: Mostly Cloudy • Wind: Calm
- Referee: Bill Athan
- TV announcers (Charter): N/A

Scoring summary
1	07:09	FS	Wendell Mathis 35–yard run (Brett Visintainer kick)	FS 7–0
1	01:24	NEV	Drew Robinson 7–yard run (Damon Fine kick)	TIE 7–7
1	00:44	FS	Wendell Mathis 4–yard run (Tyler Clutts rush fumbled)	FS 13–7
2	11:49	FS	Brett Visintainer 42–yard field goal	FS 16–7
2	09:09	FS	Roshon Vercher 1–yard run (Brett Visintainer kick)	FS 23–7
2	06:52	NEV	Damon Fine 32–yard field goal	FS 23–10
2	02:09	FS	Bryson Sumlin 18–yard run (Brett Visintainer kick)	FS 30–10
2	00:00	FS	Brett Visintainer 32–yard field goal	FS 33–10
3	13:14	FS	Jaron Fairman 54–yard pass from Paul Pinegar (Brett Visintainer kick)	FS 40–10
3	03:05	NEV	Talib Wise 1–yard run (Damon Fine kick)	FS 40–17
3	01:39	FS	Mark Wood 24–yard pass from Paul Pinegar (Clint Stitser kick)	FS 47–17
4	08:30	FS	Wendell Mathis 9–yard run (Clint Stitser kick)	FS 54–17

=== Boise State ===
Boise State at Nevada
(rivalry)

Team	1	2	3	4	Total
• No. 10 Broncos	14	14	20	10	58
Wolf Pack	0	7	7	7	21

- Date: November 27, 2004
- Location: Mackay Stadium
  Reno, NV
- Game start: 4:47 p.m. PST
- Elapsed time: 3 hours and 19 minutes
- Game attendance: 21,799
- Game weather: Temperature: 34 °F (1 °C) • Weather: Clearing and Icy • Wind: N 7 MPH
- Referee: Rich Kollen
- TV announcers (ESPN): Eric Collins, Andre Ware and Jimmy Dykes (sideline)

Scoring summary
1	05:16	BSU	Lawrence Bady 25–yard pass from Jared Zabransky (Tyler Jones kick)	BSU 7–0
1	04:26	BSU	T. J. Acree 11–yard pass from Jared Zabransky (Tyler Jones kick)	BSU 14–0
2	10:57	BSU	Jeff Carpenter 5–yard run (Tyler Jones kick)	BSU 21–0
2	04:51	NEV	Nick Hawthrone 40–yard interception (Damon Fine kick)	BSU 21–7
2	00:33	BSU	Jason Murray 15–yard pass from Jared Zabransky (Tyler Jones kick)	BSU 28–7
3	12:38	NEV	Adam Bishop 10–yard pass from Jeff Rowe (Damon Fine kick)	BSU 28–14
3	08:42	BSU	Jon Helmandollar 5–yard run (Tyler Jones kick)	BSU 35–14
3	07:08	BSU	Cam Hall 52–yard interception (Tyler Jones kick)	BSU 42–14
3	04:18	BSU	Tyler Jones 26–yard field goal	BSU 45–14
3	00:50	BSU	Tyler Jones 20–yard field goal	BSU 48–14
4	11:42	BSU	Jon Helmandollar 4–yard run (Tyler Jones kick)	BSU 55–14
4	05:55	BSU	Tyler Jones 32–yard field goal	BSU 58–14
4	02:32	NEV	Talib Wise 5–yard run (Damon Fine kick)	BSU 58–21
