= Fitz Hill =

American college football player and coach, college administrator

Biographical details
- Born: March 28, 1964 (age 62); Arkadelphia, Arkansas, U.S.

Playing career
- 1982: Northeast Louisiana
- 1983–1986: Ouachita Baptist
- Position: Wide receiver

Coaching career (HC unless noted)
- 1987: Arkadelphia HS (AR) (assistant)
- 1988: Arkansas (GA)
- 1989: Northwestern State (QB/WR)
- 1990–1991: Arkansas (volunteer)
- 1992–1997: Arkansas (WR)
- 1998: Arkansas (WR/RC)
- 1999–2000: Arkansas (asst. HC / WR / RC)
- 2001–2004: San Jose State

Administrative career (AD unless noted)
- 2006–2016: Arkansas Baptist (president)

Head coaching record
- Overall: 14–33

Omon Fitzgerald Hill (born March 28, 1964) is an American former college football player and coach and college administrator. Hill served as the head football coach at San Jose State University from 2001 to 2004, compiling a record of 14–33. He was the president of Arkansas Baptist College from 2006 to 2016.

== Early life ==
The youngest of three brothers, Fitz Hill was born and raised in Arkadelphia, Arkansas. His father James routinely worked 14-hour days as a production manager at Arkadelphia Beverage Company in the daytime and janitor in the nighttime. His mother Mary was a high school registrar and volunteered with local children and college students at her church. As a student, Hill was elected class president of Arkadelphia High School.

== College playing career ==
Hill earned an athletic scholarship to Northeast Louisiana University (now the University of Louisiana at Monroe), then a Division I-AA school, playing wide receiver on the Northeast Louisiana Indians football team. In 1983, while a college freshman, Hill's father died of stomach cancer. Six weeks later, Hill's mother had an aneurysm and later a stroke that left her partially paralyzed and unable to speak. Hill left Northeastern Louisiana and returned to Arkadelphia to help take care of his mother, who died in 2009.

Hill transferred to Ouachita Baptist University in Arkadelphia. To pay for school, Hill managed a shoe repair store and joined the Army ROTC. Hill also founded a coin-op laundromat in 1986 and would manage it until 1996. He continued to play football and was a NAIA All-American in 1985 and 1986. He graduated in 1987 with a double major B.A. in communications and physical education. He received a master's degree in Student Personnel Services from Northwestern State University in Natchitoches, Louisiana, where he served as a graduate assistant football coach during the 1988 football season.

== Military career ==
During the early years of his coaching career, Hill's career was briefly interrupted by military service during the Gulf War, where he was a transportation officer. He coordinated the transportation of rations and supplies to American troops participating in Desert Shield and Desert Storm; during this time he was promoted to first lieutenant and received the Bronze Star and Commendation Medal.

== Coaching career ==
=== Early coaching career (1987–1988) ===
After graduating from Ouachita Baptist University, Hill returned to Arkadelphia High School in 1987 as an assistant football coach. In 1988, Hill enrolled at Northwestern State University in Natchitoches, Louisiana and was a graduate assistant on the Northwestern State Demons football team.

=== Arkansas (1989–2000) ===
Hill transferred to the University of Arkansas in 1989 and became a graduate assistant for the Arkansas Razorbacks football team. In the spring of 1990, Hill returned to Northwestern State University and served as quarterbacks and wide receivers coach for that term. While completing his master's degree at Northwestern State, Hill continued to be a volunteer assistant coach for Arkansas in 1990 and 1991. Hill graduated from Northwestern State with a Master of Arts degree in student personnel services in 1991.

In the spring of 1992, Hill served as wide receivers coach for Utah State University. He later returned to the University of Arkansas as wide receivers coach for the 1992 regular season. Immediately after losing the season opener to Division I-AA The Citadel, Arkansas athletic director Frank Broyles fired head coach Jack Crowe. Fellow assistant coach Houston Nutt reflected on that time in the season: "The thing that was so tough that year was the uncertainty you felt every single day. As an assistant, you're thinking, 'Am I going to be here after this season? Am I going to have to get another job?'" In 2012, Hill said that Broyles "felt a change was necessary not so much for the team, but for public perception" after the loss to The Citadel. Hill remained on the staff of interim head coach Joe Kines and was retained by permanent head coach Danny Ford in 1993. Hill continued to be wide receivers coach until 2000. In 1998, under new head coach Houston Nutt, Hill added recruiting coordinator to his duties. In 2000, Hill became assistant head coach as well.

During Hill's time at Arkansas as wide receivers coach, Arkansas made the AP Top 25 poll in 1995, 1998, and 1999, with the #16 spot in the 1998 final AP poll and #17 in the 1999 final AP poll. Arkansas won the 2000 Cotton Bowl Classic following its 1999 season and appeared in the December 1995 Carquest Bowl, 1999 Florida Citrus Bowl (after the 1998 season), and 2000 Las Vegas Bowl.

In 1997, Hill received his Ed.D. from Arkansas; his doctoral thesis examined the "barriers restricting employment opportunities" for black coaches.

=== San Jose State (2001–2004) ===
==== 2001 season ====
In December 2000, Hill was hired as the head coach for the San Jose State University Spartans football team. Hill became the 17th black coach in Division I-A football and one of the few I-A coaches with a doctorate. When Hill was hired, the San Jose State athletic department was in financial trouble and ranked 106th out of 114 Division I-A schools in football home game attendance, with an average attendance of about 12,000. The financial issues forced San Jose State to schedule numerous road games against schools in BCS Automatic Qualifier conferences during Hill's tenure, including USC, Florida, and Ohio State.

In Hill's first season as head coach, San Jose State finished 3–9 in 2001. For the season, average home game attendance fell to about 10,000 in a 30,000-seat Spartan Stadium. This put San Jose State's Division I-A status in jeopardy because the NCAA passed a new requirement in 2002 requiring average home game attendance to be at least 15,000.

==== 2002 season ====
San Jose State improved to 6–7 in 2002 albeit one win short of bowl eligibility, in a season with 9 of the 13 games on the road. The season began with a 33–14 win in Little Rock, Arkansas over Arkansas State, in a homecoming of sorts for Fitz Hill. By October 5, San Jose State reached a 4–2 record, including a win over defending Big Ten champion Illinois. However, San Jose State went 2–5 in the final seven games of the season. In the regular season finale, a rivalry game against Fresno State, San Jose State lost 19–16. Fresno State scored 10 points off San Jose State turnovers, specifically a botched punt and interception. Hill was criticized for not running out the clock with 1:32 left in the second quarter and San Jose State with a ten-point lead, since the botched punt occurred in the last minute of the second quarter. Another questionable play call was a running play on fourth-and-one with San Jose State leading 16-13 early in the fourth quarter.

==== 2003 season ====
In March 2003, Hill achieved a two-year effort to schedule a season opener against Grambling State, a historically black university in Louisiana. The game was dubbed the Dr. Martin Luther King Literacy Classic, which shares a namesake with the new library to be opened on the San Jose State campus. Profits from the game would benefit literacy programs. Hill said that he thought the game would succeed because the Bay Area had a large base of Grambling State alumni. In the Spartans' first shutout since 1988, San Jose State beat Grambling State 29–0 in a sellout game that featured the Grambling State marching band at halftime.

However, San Jose State then finished its 2003 season 3–8. Among its 8 losses were a 13–10 loss to Hawaii in which San Jose State came up one yard short in attempting a game-winning touchdown. With 20 seconds left and the Spartans at the Hawaii 5, the San Jose State offensive coordinator called a time-consuming screen pass to tight end Courtney Anderson, who was tackled at the one-yard line. Scott Rislov attempted to spike the ball to stop the clock with 2 seconds to go, but referees declared the game over. In the season finale on November 22, San Jose State lost 34–32 to Tulsa. The Spartans failed on a game-tying two-point conversion with 5:59 left in the game. On their final drive, the Spartans also could not convert a fourth-and-1 from their own 49.

The graduation rate for San Jose State football players improved to 36 percent for the 2003–04 academic year, compared to 17 percent in 2001–02 and 21 percent in 2002–03. However, this rate was the worst among the three Division I-A California State University football programs (Fresno State and San Diego State) and trailed graduation rates for all San Jose State student-athletes and the general student body.

==== 2004 season ====
With rising costs of Division I-A football, dwindling attendance for home games, and budget cuts affecting the university, a movement began in the spring of 2004 among San Jose State faculty calling for the football program to withdraw from Division I-A.

To follow the successful Literacy Classic from 2003, Hill organized a similar game, dubbed the Read-2-Lead Classic, surrounding the 2004 home opener against Morgan State, like Grambling State a historically black university. San Jose State hosted events leading up to this game, including a discussion about education with Fitz Hill and Bill Cosby. Boyz II Men also performed the national anthem before the game. Although San Jose State won 47–28, only around 11,000 attended the Read-2-Lead Classic, in comparison with the 2003 Literacy Classic attracting a sellout crowd of over 30,000.

San Jose State finished the season 2–9; Hill left San Jose State with an overall 14–33 record. The season included a 70–63 victory over Rice in which the total score broke an NCAA record for combined points in a non-overtime game. Also, San Jose State lost in double overtime to AP 14th-ranked Boise State, after a potential game-winning field goal late in the 4th quarter was blocked. On November 22, 2004, before the final game of the season, Hill announced that he would resign from San Jose State after season's end, at the request of interim university president Don Kassing.

Since 2003, when the NCAA introduced the Academic Progress Rate (APR), San Jose State football posted APR scores that failed to reach the baseline 925 because student-athletes recruited by Hill either failed to graduate or became academically ineligible for the football team. As a result, in 2006, the NCAA took away scholarships from San Jose State football. It took until 2010 for San Jose State's multiyear APR to rise above 925 and for the program to be allocated the full 85 scholarships.

== Executive career ==
Hill returned to Arkansas in December 2004, becoming executive director of the Ouachita Opportunity Fund at Ouachita Baptist University as well as co-founder and co-general manager of Life Champs Sports, a youth sports program headquartered in Little Rock. From 2004 to 2006, he was a visiting scholar and research associate at the University of Central Florida's DeVos Sport Business Management Program. During his time at San Jose State, Hill created the Delta Classic, a college football game between historically black colleges held annually in Little Rock, Arkansas. While raising support for the Delta Classic, Hill contacted Arkansas Baptist College (ABC) to speak with their president and found out they, at the time, did not have one. After giving his presentation on the Delta Classic to the school's board of trustees, they offered him the position of school president. On February 1, 2006, Hill became the 13th president of Arkansas Baptist College, succeeding Israel R. Dunn Jr.

At the time Hill took over at ABC, there was no salary budgeted to pay him and the school's enrollment had dipped to fewer than 200 students; the college was in danger of being stripped of its accreditation by the North Central Association of Colleges and Schools. In five years, the school grew enrollment to 1,100 students, its budget $2 million to nearly $20 million, and kept its accreditation; Hill then drew a salary.

== Personal life ==
Hill is a devout Christian. He married fellow Ouachita Baptist classmate, Cynthia Hill; she was born in Italy to an American military serviceman and an Italian mother. She received her doctorate not long after her husband and is currently in charge of Institutional Advancement at ABC. The couple has three children, Destiny, Faith, and Justice.

== Head coaching record ==
Year	Team	Overall	Conference	Standing	Bowl/playoffs
San Jose State Spartans (Western Athletic Conference) (2001–2004)
2001	San Jose State	3–9	3–4	T–6th	
2002	San Jose State	6–7	3–4	6th	
2003	San Jose State	3–8	2–6	8th	
2004	San Jose State	2–9	1–7	10th	
San Jose State:		14–33	9–21		
Total:		14–33			
