= 2004 SMU Mustangs football team =

American college football season

2004 SMU Mustangs football
- Conference: Western Athletic Conference
- Record: 3–8 (3–5 WAC)
- Head coach: Phil Bennett (3rd season)
- Offensive coordinator: Rusty Burns (1st season)
- Offensive scheme: Spread
- Defensive coordinator: Jim Gush (3rd season)
- Base defense: 4–3
- Home stadium: Gerald J. Ford Stadium

2004 Western Athletic Conference football standings
	Conf.			Overall
Team	W		L	W		L
No. 12 Boise State $	8	–	0	11	–	1
UTEP	6	–	2	8	–	4
No. 22 Fresno State	5	–	3	9	–	3
Louisiana Tech	5	–	3	6	–	6
Hawaii	4	–	4	8	–	5
Nevada	3	–	5	5	–	7
Tulsa	3	–	5	4	–	8
SMU	3	–	5	3	–	8
Rice	2	–	6	3	–	8
San Jose State	1	–	7	2	–	9
$ – Conference champion; Rankings from AP Poll

The 2004 SMU Mustangs football team represented Southern Methodist University (SMU) as a member the Western Athletic Conference (WAC) during the 2004 NCAA Division I-A football season. Led by third-year head coach Phil Bennett, the Mustangs compiled an overall record of 3–8 with a mark of 3–5 in conference play, tying for sixth place in the WAC in what would be their final year in the conference.

== Schedule ==
Date	Time	Opponent	Site	TV	Result	Attendance
September 4	7:00 p.m.	Texas Tech*	Gerald J. Ford Stadium; University Park, TX		L 13–27	34,689
September 11	6:05 p.m.	at TCU*	Amon G. Carter Stadium; Fort Worth, TX (rivalry)		L 0–44	33,458
September 18	6:00 p.m.	at Oklahoma State*	Boone Pickens Stadium; Stillwater, OK		L 7–59	46,073
September 25	7:00 p.m.	San Jose State	Gerald J. Ford Stadium; University Park, TX		W 36–13	17,841
October 2	7:05 p.m.	at No. 23 Boise State	Bronco Stadium; Boise, ID	SPW	L 20–38	30,322
October 9	7:00 p.m.	at Rice	Rice Stadium; Houston, TX (rivalry)		L 10–44	15,367
October 16	5:00 p.m.	Louisiana Tech	Gerald J. Ford Stadium; University Park, TX	SPW	L 10–41	13,117
October 30	9:00 p.m.	at Fresno State	Bulldog Stadium; Fresno, CA		L 0–42	37,604
November 6	2:00 p.m.	Tulsa^{†}	Gerald J. Ford Stadium; University Park, TX		W 41–35 ^{OT}	12,677
November 13	5:00 p.m.	Nevada	Gerald J. Ford Stadium; University Park, TX	ESPNGP	W 38–20	10,206
November 20	4:05 p.m.	at No. 24 UTEP	Sun Bowl; El Paso, TX		L 27–57	45,095
*Non-conference game; ^{†}Homecoming; Rankings from AP Poll released prior to the game

== Roster ==
2004 SMU Mustangs football team roster
Players
Coaches
Offense

Pos.	#	Name	Class
QB	12	Ashton Nixon	Fr
QB	13	Jerad Romo	Jr

Defense

Pos.	#	Name	Class
SS	27	Alvin Nnabuife	Jr
DE	40	Justin Rogers	So

Special teams

Pos.	#	Name	Class
P	41	Ryan Mentzel	Jr

Head coach

- Phil Bennett

Coordinators/assistant coaches

Legend

- (C) Team captain
- (S) Suspended
- (I) Ineligible
- Injured
- Redshirt

Roster
Last update: 2004-10-13
