= 2004 Liberty Bowl =

2004 AutoZone Liberty Bowl
- 46th Liberty Bowl
Boise State Broncos	Louisville Cardinals
(11–0)	(10–1)
WAC	C-USA
40	44
Head coach: Dan Hawkins	Head coach: Bobby Petrino
AP / Coaches / BCS; 10 / 10 / 9	AP / Coaches / BCS; 7 / 8 / 10
	1	2	3	4	Total
Boise State	10	21	3	6	40
Louisville	14	7	14	9	44
- Date: December 31, 2004
- Season: 2004
- Stadium: Liberty Bowl Memorial Stadium
- Location: Memphis, Tennessee
- MVP: Stefan LeFors (QB, Louisville)
- Referee: Ron Cherry (ACC)
- Attendance: 58,355

United States TV coverage
- Network: ESPN
- Announcers: Mike Tirico, Kirk Herbstreit, Jill Arrington

The 2004 Liberty Bowl was a college football postseason bowl game played on December 31, 2004, in Memphis, Tennessee. The 46th edition of the Liberty Bowl was played between the Boise State Broncos and the Louisville Cardinals in front of 58,355 fans. With sponsorship from AutoZone, the game was officially the AutoZone Liberty Bowl. Louisville overcame a 10-point halftime deficit to win, 44–40.

Of non-Bowl Championship Series (BCS) bowl games following the 2004 regular season, this game featured the highest ranking teams, with Boise State 9th and Louisville 10th in the BCS rankings. Boise State played in place of the Mountain West Conference champions, the Utah Utes, who played in the Fiesta Bowl instead.

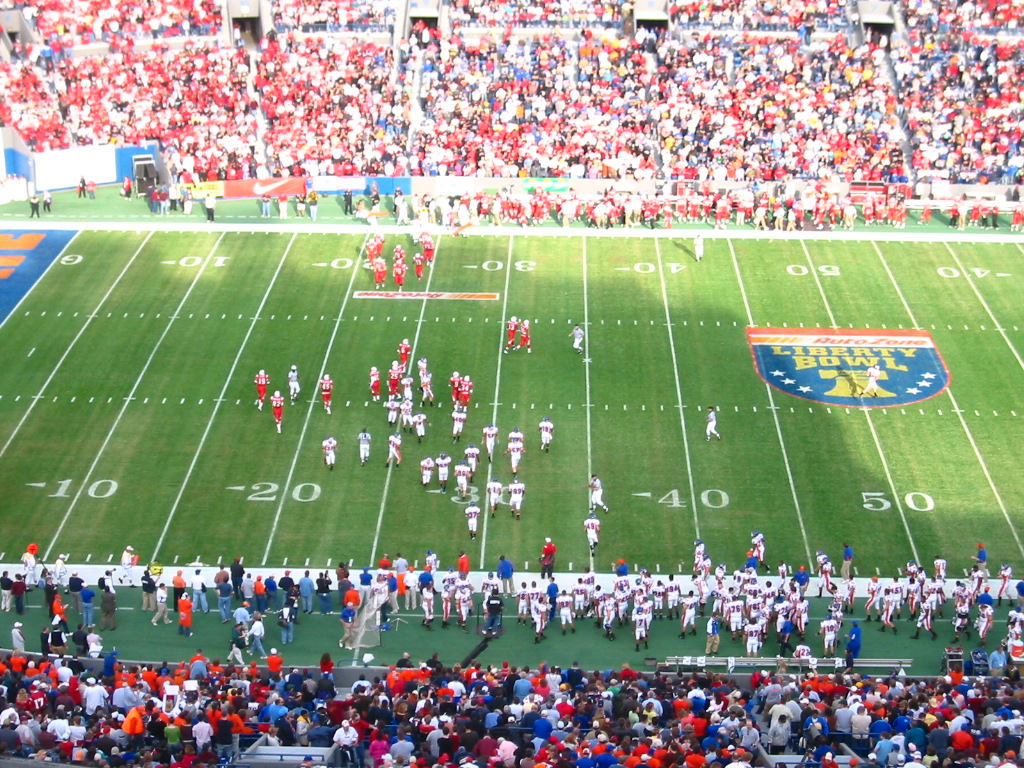
Boise State and Louisville square off in the 2004 Liberty Bowl in Memphis, Tennessee.
