= 2004 San Jose State Spartans football team =

American college football season

2004 San Jose State Spartans football
- Conference: Western Athletic Conference
- Record: 2–9 (1–7 WAC)
- Head coach: Fitz Hill (4th season)
- Co-offensive coordinator: Barry Lunney Jr. (2nd season)
- Defensive coordinator: Keith Burns (1st season)
- Home stadium: Spartan Stadium

2004 Western Athletic Conference football standings
	Conf.			Overall
Team	W		L	W		L
No. 12 Boise State $	8	–	0	11	–	1
UTEP	6	–	2	8	–	4
No. 22 Fresno State	5	–	3	9	–	3
Louisiana Tech	5	–	3	6	–	6
Hawaii	4	–	4	8	–	5
Nevada	3	–	5	5	–	7
Tulsa	3	–	5	4	–	8
SMU	3	–	5	3	–	8
Rice	2	–	6	3	–	8
San Jose State	1	–	7	2	–	9
$ – Conference champion; Rankings from AP Poll

The 2004 San Jose State Spartans football team represented San Jose State University in the 2004 NCAA Division I-A football season. The team played their home games at Spartan Stadium in San Jose, California. They participated as members of the Western Athletic Conference. They were coached by head coach Fitz Hill, who resigned after the end of the season to become a "Visiting Scholar" position at the University of Central Florida’s DeVos Sports Business Management Program.

The Spartans' 70-63 win over Rice on October 2 set an NCAA record for overall points scored by both teams in regulation.

== Attendance issues and possible cancellation of football ==
The San Jose Mercury News reported in March 2004 that budget cuts led some faculty members at San Jose State to advocate removing the SJSU football program from Division IA athletics. Locally there was much speculation that San Jose State would drop football due to poor attendance and student-athlete graduation rates.

=== Read-2-Lead Classic ===
The "Read-2-Lead Classic" was an attempt to help the football team achieve average attendance of 15,000 to retain NCAA Division I-A status. With an emphasis on literacy, the university hosted a series of events in September 2004, including a conversation with comedian Bill Cosby and a concert by Boyz II Men. The game sold just 11,360 tickets. In contrast, the 2003 Read-2-Lead Classic had an official attendance of over 31,000.

== Schedule ==
Date	Time	Opponent	Site	TV	Result	Attendance	Source
September 4	7:00 pm	at Stanford*	Stanford Stadium; Stanford, CA (rivalry)	KRON	L 3–43	39,750	
September 18	2:00 pm	Morgan State*	Spartan Stadium; San Jose, CA (Read-2-Lead Classic)	CSN	W 47–28	10,411	
September 25	5:00 pm	at SMU	Gerald J. Ford Stadium; University Park, TX		L 13–36	17,841	
October 2	6:00 pm	Rice	Spartan Stadium; San Jose, CA		W 70–63	4,467	
October 9	12:30 pm	at Washington*	Husky Stadium; Seattle, WA		L 6–21	65,816	
October 23	9:05 pm	at Hawaii	Aloha Stadium; Halawa, HI (Dick Tomey Legacy Game)		L 28–46	36,264	
October 30	2:00 pm	No. 24 UTEP	Spartan Stadium; San Jose, CA	KRON	L 20–38	5,968	
November 6	6:05 pm	at Nevada	Mackay Stadium; Reno, NV	KRON	L 24–42	15,902	
November 13	9:00 am	No. 10 Boise State	Spartan Stadium; San Jose, CA	ESPN2	L 49–56 ^{2OT}	5,028	
November 20	12:00 pm	at Tulsa	Skelly Stadium; Tulsa, OK		L 24–34	15,784	
November 27	2:00 pm	Fresno State	Spartan Stadium; San Jose, CA (rivalry)	KRON, ESPN GamePlan	L 28–62	6,521	
*Non-conference game; Rankings from AP Poll released prior to the game; All times are in Pacific time

== Game summaries ==
=== At Stanford ===
	1	2	3	4	Total
Spartans	0	0	0	3	3
Cardinal	7	8	21	7	43

=== Morgan State ===
	1	2	3	4	Total
Bears	7	7	0	14	28
Spartans	7	17	16	7	47

=== At SMU ===
	1	2	3	4	Total
Spartans	0	6	0	7	13
Mustangs	14	8	7	7	36

=== Rice ===
	1	2	3	4	Total
Owls	21	13	15	14	63
Spartans	7	21	14	28	70

=== At Washington ===
	1	2	3	4	Total
Spartans	0	3	0	3	6
Huskies	7	0	7	7	21

=== At Hawaii ===
	1	2	3	4	Total
Spartans	7	7	0	14	28
Warriors	0	24	10	12	46

=== No. 24 UTEP ===
	1	2	3	4	Total
No. 24 Miners	14	0	10	14	38
Spartans	7	0	0	13	20

=== At Nevada ===
	1	2	3	4	Total
Spartans	0	0	10	14	24
Wolf Pack	7	7	14	14	42

=== No. 10 Boise State (2OT) ===
	1	2	3	4	OT	Total
No. 10 Broncos	7	21	14	0	14	56
Spartans	14	7	14	7	7	49

=== At Tulsa ===
	1	2	3	4	Total
Spartans	0	21	3	0	24
Golden Hurricane	10	14	3	7	34

=== Fresno State ===
	1	2	3	4	Total
Bulldogs	14	27	7	14	62
Spartans	7	7	7	7	28
