= 2004 Hawaii Warriors football team =

American college football season

2004 Hawaii Warriors football

Hawaii Bowl champion

Hawaii Bowl, W 59–40 vs. UAB
- Conference: Western Athletic Conference
- Record: 8–5 (4–4 WAC)
- Head coach: June Jones (6th season)
- Offensive scheme: Run and shoot
- Defensive coordinator: George Lumpkin (2nd season)
- Base defense: 4–3
- Home stadium: Aloha Stadium

2004 Western Athletic Conference football standings
| | Conf. | | | Overall |
| Team | W | | L | W | | L |
|---|---|---|---|---|---|---|
| No. 12 Boise State $ | 8 | – | 0 | 11 | – | 1 |
| UTEP | 6 | – | 2 | 8 | – | 4 |
| No. 22 Fresno State | 5 | – | 3 | 9 | – | 3 |
| Louisiana Tech | 5 | – | 3 | 6 | – | 6 |
| Hawaii | 4 | – | 4 | 8 | – | 5 |
| Nevada | 3 | – | 5 | 5 | – | 7 |
| Tulsa | 3 | – | 5 | 4 | – | 8 |
| SMU | 3 | – | 5 | 3 | – | 8 |
| Rice | 2 | – | 6 | 3 | – | 8 |
| San Jose State | 1 | – | 7 | 2 | – | 9 |
$ – Conference champion; Rankings from AP Poll

The 2004 Hawaii Warriors football team represented the University of Hawaii at Manoa in the 2004 NCAA Division I-A football season. Hawaii finished the 2004 season with an 8–5 record, going 4–4 in Western Athletic Conference (WAC) play. The Warriors made their third straight appearance in the Hawaii Bowl, facing off against the UAB Blazers. The Warriors would go on to defeat the Blazers and cap off their third straight winning season, the fifth in six seasons under head coach June Jones.

In his final season, quarterback Timmy Chang set the NCAA Division I-A all-time passing yards record with 17,072, surpassing the old mark held by BYU quarterback Ty Detmer (15,031) by more than 2,000 yards. As of 2025, Chang has the third-most career passing yards in FBS history. He also set records for total offensive yards (17,183), most offensive plays (2,610), and most interceptions (77).

Wide receiver Chad Owens won the Mosi Tatupu Award for the best special teams player in the country and would earn second team AP All-American honors as an all-purpose player. He was drafted by the Jacksonville Jaguars in the 2005 NFL draft in the sixth round.

== Schedule ==
| Date | Time | Opponent | Site | TV | Result | Attendance |
|---|---|---|---|---|---|---|
| September 5 | 6:00 pm | Florida Atlantic* | Aloha Stadium; Halawa, HI | ESPNGP | L 28–35 ^{OT} | 39,390 |
| September 18 | 2:00 pm | at Rice | Rice Stadium; Houston, TX | SPW | L 29–41 | 8,109 |
| October 3 | 6:00 pm | Tulsa | Aloha Stadium; Halawa, HI | | W 44–16 | 44,429 |
| October 10 | 6:00 pm | Nevada | Aloha Stadium; Halawa, HI | | W 48–26 | 35,078 |
| October 16 | 3:00 pm | at UTEP | Sun Bowl; El Paso, TX | ESPN Plus | L 20–51 | 44,381 |
| October 23 | 6:00 pm | San Jose State | Aloha Stadium; Halawa, HI (rivalry) | ESPNGP | W 46–28 | 36,264 |
| October 29 | 2:00 pm | at No. 15 Boise State* | Bronco Stadium; Boise, ID | ESPN2 | L 3–69 | 29,591 |
| November 6 | 6:00 pm | Louisiana Tech | Aloha Stadium; Halawa, HI | ESPNGP | W 34–23 | 32,879 |
| November 12 | 5:30 pm | at Fresno State | Bulldog Stadium; Fresno, CA (rivalry) | ESPN | L 14–70 | 38,956 |
| November 20 | 6:00 pm | Idaho* | Aloha Stadium; Halawa, HI | ESPNGP | W 52–21 | 30,864 |
| November 27 | 6:00 pm | Northwestern* | Aloha Stadium; Halawa, HI | ESPN2 | W 49–41 | 33,846 |
| December 4 | 6:30 pm | Michigan State* | Aloha Stadium; Halawa, HI | ESPN2 | W 41–38 | 41,654 |
| December 24 | 2:00 pm | UAB* | Aloha Stadium; Halawa, HI (Hawaii Bowl) | ESPN | W 59–40 | 39,754 |
*Non-conference game; Rankings from AP Poll released prior to the game; All times are in Hawaii–Aleutian time; Source:

== Statistics ==
- QB Timmy Chang: 358/602 (59.5%) for 4,258 yards with 38 TD vs. 13 INT. 37 carries for 15 yards and 2 TD.
- RB Michael Brewster: 113 carries for 722 yards and 6 TD. 34 catches for 273 yards and 1 TD.
- RB West Kellikipi: 72 carries for 336 yards and 7 TD. 17 catches for 131 yards and 0 TD.
- WR Chad Owens: 102 catches for 1,290 yards and 17 TD.
- WR Jason Rivers: 80 catches for 973 yards and 7 TD.
- WR Britton Komine: 53 catches for 788 yards and 4 TD.
- WR Gerald Welch: 45 catches for 515 yards and 5 TD.
- WR Se'e Poumele: 13 catches for 151 yards and 2 TD.
- WR Ross Dickerson: 15 catches for 143 yards and 1 TD.
- K Justin Ayat: 11/15 on field goals and 54/58 on extra points.
