= 2004 Tulsa Golden Hurricane football team =

American college football season

2004 Tulsa Golden Hurricane football
- Conference: Western Athletic Conference
- Record: 4–8 (3–5 WAC)
- Head coach: Steve Kragthorpe (2nd season)
- Offensive coordinator: Charlie Stubbs (2nd season)
- Offensive scheme: Multiple
- Defensive coordinator: Todd Graham (2nd season)
- Base defense: 3–3–5
- Home stadium: Skelly Stadium

2004 Western Athletic Conference football standings
	Conf.			Overall
Team	W		L	W		L
No. 12 Boise State $	8	–	0	11	–	1
UTEP	6	–	2	8	–	4
No. 22 Fresno State	5	–	3	9	–	3
Louisiana Tech	5	–	3	6	–	6
Hawaii	4	–	4	8	–	5
Nevada	3	–	5	5	–	7
Tulsa	3	–	5	4	–	8
SMU	3	–	5	3	–	8
Rice	2	–	6	3	–	8
San Jose State	1	–	7	2	–	9
$ – Conference champion; Rankings from AP Poll

The 2004 Tulsa Golden Hurricane football team represented the University of Tulsa in the 2004 NCAA Division I-A football season. The team's head coach was Steve Kragthorpe. They played home games at Skelly Stadium in Tulsa, Oklahoma and competed in their final season as a member of the Western Athletic Conference.

== Schedule ==
Date	Time	Opponent	Site	TV	Result	Attendance	Source
September 4	6:00 pm	at Kansas*	Memorial Stadium; Lawrence, KS	PPV	L 3–21	40,646	
September 11	6:00 pm	at Oklahoma State*	Boone Pickens Stadium; Stillwater, OK (rivalry)	PPV	L 21–38	47,307	
September 18	6:00 pm	Navy*	Skelly Stadium; Tulsa, OK		L 0–29	23,658	
September 25	6:00 pm	Southwest Missouri State*	Skelly Stadium; Tulsa, OK		W 49–7	17,980	
October 2	11:00 pm	at Hawaii	Aloha Stadium; Halawa, HI		L 16–44	44,429	
October 16	6:00 pm	No. 18 Boise State^{†}	Skelly Stadium; Tulsa, OK		L 42–45	20,817	
October 23	8:00 pm	at Nevada	Mackay Stadium; Reno, NV		L 48–52 ^{3OT}	13,350	
October 30	3:00 pm	Rice	Skelly Stadium; Tulsa, OK	SPW	W 39–22	12,218	
November 6	2:00 pm	at SMU	Gerald J. Ford Stadium; University Park, TX		L 35–41 ^{OT}	12,677	
November 13	6:00 pm	at Louisiana Tech	Independence Stadium; Shreveport, LA	SPW	L 21–38	7,713	
November 20	2:00 pm	San Jose State	Skelly Stadium; Tulsa, OK		W 34–24	15,784	
November 27	2:00 pm	No. 24 UTEP	Skelly Stadium; Tulsa, OK		W 37–35	10,977	
*Non-conference game; ^{†}Homecoming; Rankings from AP Poll released prior to the game; All times are in Central time

== After the season ==
=== 2005 NFL draft ===
The following Golden Hurricane player was selected in the 2005 NFL draft following the season.

Round	Pick	Player	Position	NFL club
7	229	James Kilian	Quarterback	Kansas City Chiefs
