= 2004 Louisiana Tech Bulldogs football team =

American college football season

2004 Louisiana Tech Bulldogs football
- Conference: Western Athletic Conference
- Record: 6–6 (5–3 WAC)
- Head coach: Jack Bicknell Jr. (6th season)
- Offensive coordinator: Conroy Hines (5th season)
- Defensive coordinator: Tim Rose (1st season)
- Captains: Travon Brown; Jamelle Cage; Aaron Capps; Julius Crosby; Erick Franklin; Chris Van Hoy; John Nash
- Home stadium: Joe Aillet Stadium; Independence Stadium

2004 Western Athletic Conference football standings
	Conf.			Overall
Team	W		L	W		L
No. 12 Boise State $	8	–	0	11	–	1
UTEP	6	–	2	8	–	4
No. 22 Fresno State	5	–	3	9	–	3
Louisiana Tech	5	–	3	6	–	6
Hawaii	4	–	4	8	–	5
Nevada	3	–	5	5	–	7
Tulsa	3	–	5	4	–	8
SMU	3	–	5	3	–	8
Rice	2	–	6	3	–	8
San Jose State	1	–	7	2	–	9
$ – Conference champion; Rankings from AP Poll

The 2004 Louisiana Tech Bulldogs football team represented Louisiana Tech University as a member of the Western Athletic Conference (WAC) during the 2004 NCAA Division I-A football season.

Led by sixth-year head coach Jack Bicknell Jr., the Bulldogs played their home games at Joe Aillet Stadium in Ruston, Louisiana and Independence Stadium in Shreveport, Louisiana. Louisiana Tech finished the season with a record of 6–6 overall and a mark of 5–3 in conference play, tying for third place in the WAC with Fresno State.

Running back Ryan Moats led the conference in rushing yards for a second consecutive year, and was named the WAC Offensive Player of the Year. He declared for the NFL draft after the season, and was drafted in the third round by the Philadelphia Eagles.

== Schedule ==
Date	Time	Opponent	Site	TV	Result	Attendance
September 6	12:00 pm	Nevada	Joe Aillet Stadium; Ruston, LA	ESPN2	W 38–21	21,127
September 11	6:00 pm	Louisiana–Lafayette*	Joe Aillet Stadium; Ruston, LA (rivalry)	ESPN Plus	W 24–20	22,467
September 18	12:00 pm	at No. 4 Miami (FL)*	Orange Bowl; Miami, FL		L 0–48	53,721
September 25	6:00 pm	at No. 11 Tennessee*	Neyland Stadium; Knoxville, TN	PPV	L 17–42	104,257
October 2	6:00 pm	No. 17 Fresno State	Joe Aillet Stadium; Ruston, LA	SPW	W 28–21	18,330
October 9	2:30 pm	at No. 6 Auburn*	Jordan–Hare Stadium; Auburn, AL	PPV	L 7–52	77,016
October 16	5:00 pm	at SMU	Gerald J. Ford Stadium; Dallas, TX	SPW	W 41–10	13,117
October 23	2:00 pm	UTEP^{†}	Joe Aillet Stadium; Ruston, LA	SPW	L 27–44	18,103
November 6	10:00 pm	at Hawaii	Aloha Stadium; Honolulu, HI	ESPNGP	L 23–34	32,879
November 13	6:00 pm	Tulsa	Independence Stadium; Shreveport, LA	SPW	W 38–24	7,713
November 20	2:05 pm	at No. 13 Boise State	Bronco Stadium; Boise, ID	ESPN Plus	L 14–55	30,462
November 29	7:00 pm	at Rice	Reliant Stadium; Houston, TX		W 51–14	8,317
*Non-conference game; ^{†}Homecoming; Rankings from AP Poll released prior to the game; All times are in Central time
