= 2004 Fresno State Bulldogs football team =

American college football season

2004 Fresno State Bulldogs football
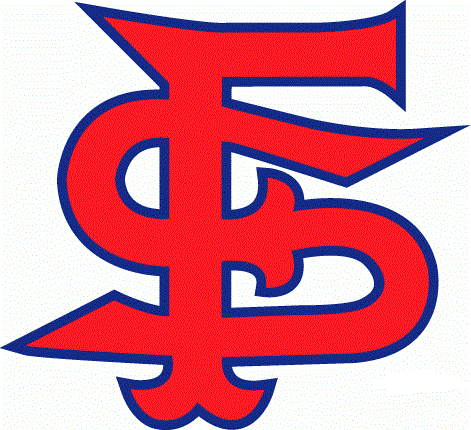

MPC Computers Bowl champion

MPC Computers Bowl, W 37–34 ^{OT} vs. Virginia
- Conference: Western Athletic Conference

Ranking
- Coaches: No. 22
- AP: No. 22
- Record: 9–3 (5–3 WAC)
- Head coach: Pat Hill (8th season)
- Offensive coordinator: Frank Cignetti Jr. (3rd season)
- Offensive scheme: Pro-style
- Defensive coordinator: Dan Brown (4th season)
- Base defense: 4–3
- Home stadium: Bulldog Stadium (Capacity: 41,031)

2004 Western Athletic Conference football standings
	Conf.			Overall
Team	W		L	W		L
No. 12 Boise State $	8	–	0	11	–	1
UTEP	6	–	2	8	–	4
No. 22 Fresno State	5	–	3	9	–	3
Louisiana Tech	5	–	3	6	–	6
Hawaii	4	–	4	8	–	5
Nevada	3	–	5	5	–	7
Tulsa	3	–	5	4	–	8
SMU	3	–	5	3	–	8
Rice	2	–	6	3	–	8
San Jose State	1	–	7	2	–	9
$ – Conference champion; Rankings from AP Poll

The 2004 Fresno State football team represented California State University, Fresno in the 2004 NCAA Division I-A football season. They played their home games at Bulldog Stadium in Fresno, California and were coached by Pat Hill.

== Schedule ==
Date	Time	Opponent	Rank	Site	TV	Result	Attendance	Source
September 5	2:30 pm	at Washington*		Husky Stadium; Seattle, WA	FSN	W 35–16	65,345	
September 11	9:00 am	at No. 13 Kansas State*		KSU Stadium; Manhattan, KS	FSN	W 45–21	46,468	
September 18	7:00 pm	Portland State*	No. 19	Bulldog Stadium; Fresno, CA		W 27–17	42,662	
October 2	4:00 pm	at Louisiana Tech	No. 17	Joe Aillet Stadium; Ruston, LA	BSN	L 21–28	18,330	
October 9	7:00 pm	UTEP		Bulldog Stadium; Fresno, CA		L 21–24	40,407	
October 23	7:15 pm	at No. 19 Boise State		Bronco Stadium; Boise, ID (rivalry)	ESPN2	L 16–33	30,623	
October 30	7:00 pm	SMU		Bulldog Stadium; Fresno, CA		W 42–0	37,604	
November 6	12:00 pm	at Rice		Rice Stadium; Houston, TX	BSN	W 52–21	18,407	
November 12	7:30 pm	Hawaii		Bulldog Stadium; Fresno, CA (rivalry)	ESPN	W 70–14	38,956	
November 20	6:00 pm	Nevada		Bulldog Stadium; Fresno, CA	BSN	W 54–17	39,256	
November 27	2:00 pm	at San Jose State		Spartan Stadium; San Jose, CA (rivalry)	BSN	W 62–28	28,867	
December 27	11:00 am	vs. No. 18 Virginia*		Bronco Stadium; Boise, ID (MPC Computers Bowl)	ESPN	W 37–34 ^{OT}	28,516	
*Non-conference game; Rankings from AP Poll released prior to the game; All times are in Pacific time

== Rankings ==
Ranking movements Legend: ██ Increase in ranking ██ Decrease in ranking — = Not ranked RV = Received votes
	Week															
Poll	Pre	1	2	3	4	5	6	7	8	9	10	11	12	13	14	Final
AP Poll	—	RV	19	17	17	RV	—	—	—	—	—	RV	RV	RV	RV	22
Coaches Poll	—	RV	20	17	17	RV	—	—	—	—	—	RV	RV	RV	RV	22
BCS	Not released							—	—	—	—	—	—	—	—	Not released

== Game summaries ==
=== At Washington ===
	1	2	3	4	Total
Bulldogs	0	7	7	21	35
Huskies	0	7	3	6	16

Statistics	FRES	WASH
First downs	11	20
Total yards	262	360
Rushing yards	137	170
Passing yards	142	201
Turnovers	2	5

Team	Category	Player	Statistics
Fresno State	Passing	Paul Pinegar	13/21, 125 yards, TD, INT
Fresno State	Rushing	Dwayne Wright	24 rushes, 109 yards, TD
Fresno State	Receiving	Paul Williams	1 reception, 43 yards
Washington	Passing	Casey Paus	18/39, 183 yards, 3 INT
Washington	Rushing	Kenny James	17 rushes, 95 yards, TD
Washington	Receiving	Charles Frederick	9 receptions, 114 yards

=== At No. 13 Kansas State ===
	1	2	3	4	Total
Bulldogs	14	17	7	7	45
No. 13 Wildcats	7	7	0	7	21

Statistics	FRES	KSU
First downs	18	11
Total yards	400	180
Rushing yards	156	59
Passing yards	245	133
Turnovers	3	2

Team	Category	Player	Statistics
Fresno State	Passing	Paul Pinegar	17/30, 244 yards, 2 TD, 3 INT
Fresno State	Rushing	Dwayne Wright	27 rushes, 76 yards, 2 TD
Fresno State	Receiving	Dwayne Wright	3 receptions, 65 yards
Kansas State	Passing	Dylan Meier	4/10, 91 yards, TD, INT
Kansas State	Rushing	Darren Sproles	11 rushes, 37 yards
Kansas State	Receiving	Davin Dennis	1 reception, 47 yards, TD

=== Portland State ===
	1	2	3	4	Total
Vikings	0	7	3	7	17
No. 19 Bulldogs	7	17	0	3	27

Statistics	PRST	FRES
First downs		
Total yards		
Rushing yards		
Passing yards		
Turnovers		

Team	Category	Player	Statistics
Portland State	Passing		
Portland State	Rushing		
Portland State	Receiving		
Fresno State	Passing		
Fresno State	Rushing		
Fresno State	Receiving		

=== At Louisiana Tech ===
	1	2	3	4	Total
No. 17 FRES Bulldogs	10	3	0	8	21
LT Bulldogs	0	7	7	14	28

Statistics	FRES	LT
First downs		
Total yards		
Rushing yards		
Passing yards		
Turnovers		

Team	Category	Player	Statistics
Fresno State	Passing		
Fresno State	Rushing		
Fresno State	Receiving		
Louisiana Tech	Passing		
Louisiana Tech	Rushing		
Louisiana Tech	Receiving		

=== UTEP ===
	1	2	3	4	Total
Miners	7	10	0	7	24
Bulldogs	7	0	7	7	21

=== At No. 16 Boise State ===
	1	2	3	4	Total
Bulldogs	0	3	7	6	16
No. 16 Broncos	7	9	7	10	33

=== SMU ===
	1	2	3	4	Total
Mustangs	0	0	0	0	0
Bulldogs	14	21	7	0	42

=== At Rice ===
	1	2	3	4	Total
Bulldogs	21	7	24	0	52
Owls	0	7	0	7	14

=== Hawaii ===
	1	2	3	4	Total
Warriors	0	0	7	7	14
Bulldogs	21	28	7	14	70

Statistics	HAW	FRES
First downs	18	29
Total yards	273	679
Rushing yards	106	503
Passing yards	172	176
Turnovers	4	3

Team	Category	Player	Statistics
Hawaii	Passing	Timmy Chang	26/43, 167 yards, TD, INT
Hawaii	Rushing	Michael Brewster	14 rushes, 101 yards, TD
Hawaii	Receiving	Jason Rivers	8 receptions, 54 yards, TD
Fresno State	Passing	Paul Pinegar	8/11, 176 yards, TD, INT
Fresno State	Rushing	Bryson Sumlin	18 rushes, 220 yards, 3 TD
Fresno State	Receiving	Matt Rivera	2 receptions, 60 yards

=== Nevada ===
	1	2	3	4	Total
Wolf Pack	7	3	7	0	17
Bulldogs	13	20	14	7	54

=== At San Jose State ===
	1	2	3	4	Total
Bulldogs	14	27	7	14	62
Spartans	7	7	7	7	28

=== Vs. No. 18 Virginia (2004 MPC Computers Bowl) ===
	1	2	3	4	OT	Total
No. 18 Cavaliers	14	7	3	7	3	34
Bulldogs	7	3	7	14	6	37

== Coaching staff ==
Name	Position	Seasons at Fresno State	Alma mater
Pat Hill	Head coach	8th as HC; 14th overall	UC Riverside (1973)
Frank Cignetti Jr.	Offensive coordinator	3rd	Indiana (PA) (1988)
Dan Brown	Defensive coordinator	8th	Boise State (1982)
Tom Mason	Linebackers	4th	Eastern Washington (1982)
