= 2004 Rice Owls football team =

American college football season

2004 Rice Owls football
- Conference: Western Athletic Conference
- Record: 3–8 (2–6 WAC)
- Head coach: Ken Hatfield (11th season)
- Offensive coordinator: Scott Wachenheim (4th season)
- Offensive scheme: Triple option
- Defensive coordinator: Roger Hinshaw (7th season)
- Base defense: 3–4
- Home stadium: Rice Stadium

2004 Western Athletic Conference football standings
	Conf.			Overall
Team	W		L	W		L
No. 12 Boise State $	8	–	0	11	–	1
UTEP	6	–	2	8	–	4
No. 22 Fresno State	5	–	3	9	–	3
Louisiana Tech	5	–	3	6	–	6
Hawaii	4	–	4	8	–	5
Nevada	3	–	5	5	–	7
Tulsa	3	–	5	4	–	8
SMU	3	–	5	3	–	8
Rice	2	–	6	3	–	8
San Jose State	1	–	7	2	–	9
$ – Conference champion; Rankings from AP Poll

The 2004 Rice Owls football team represented Rice University as a member of the Western Athletic Conference (WAC) during the 2004 NCAA Division I-A football season. In their 11th year under head coach Ken Hatfield, the Owls compiled an overall record of 3–8 record with a mark of 2–6 in conference play, placing ninth in the WAC. The team played home games at Rice Stadium in Houston.

== Schedule ==
Date	Time	Opponent	Site	TV	Result	Attendance
September 5	4:00 pm	vs. Houston*	Reliant Stadium; Houston, TX (rivalry)		W 10–7	28,726
September 18	7:00 pm	Hawaii	Rice Stadium; Houston, TX	SPW	W 41–29	8,109
September 25	6:00 pm	at No. 5 Texas*	Darrell K Royal–Texas Memorial Stadium; Austin, TX	FSN	L 13–35	82,931
October 2	8:00 pm	at San Jose State	Spartan Stadium; San Jose, CA		L 63–70	4,093
October 9	7:00 pm	SMU	Rice Stadium; Houston, TX (rivalry)		W 44–10	15,367
October 16	8:00 pm	at Nevada	Mackay Stadium; Reno, NV		L 10–35	18,800
October 23	12:30 pm	at Navy*	Navy–Marine Corps Memorial Stadium; Annapolis, MD		L 13–14	31,117
October 30	6:00 pm	at Tulsa	Skelly Stadium; Tulsa, OK	SPW	L 22–39	12,218
November 6	2:00 pm	Fresno State^{†}	Rice Stadium; Houston, TX		L 21–52	18,407
November 13	8:05 pm	at No. 23 UTEP	Sun Bowl; El Paso, TX		L 28–35 ^{2OT}	43,507
November 29	7:00 pm	Louisiana Tech	Reliant Stadium; Houston, TX		L 14–51	8,317
*Non-conference game; ^{†}Homecoming; Rankings from AP Poll released prior to the game; All times are in Central time
