= 2004 Navy Midshipmen football team =

American college football season

2004 Navy Midshipmen football
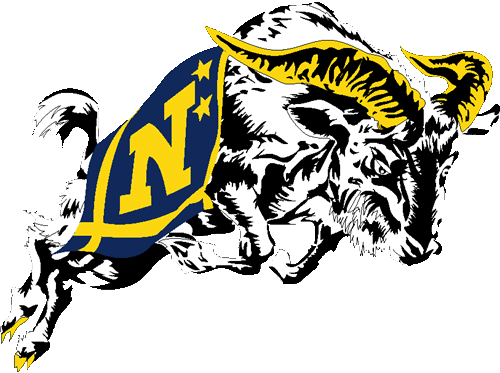

Emerald Bowl champion

Emerald Bowl, W 34–19 vs. New Mexico
- Conference: Independent

Ranking
- Coaches: No. 24
- AP: No. 24
- Record: 10–2
- Head coach: Paul Johnson (3rd season)
- Offensive scheme: Triple option
- Defensive coordinator: Buddy Green (3rd season)
- Base defense: Multiple
- MVP: Aaron Polanco
- Captains: Aaron Polanco; Josh Smith
- Home stadium: Navy–Marine Corps Memorial Stadium

2004 NCAA Division I-A independents football records
	Conf.			Overall
Team	W		L	W		L
No. 24 Navy		–		10	–	2
Notre Dame		–		6	–	6
Florida A&M		–		3	–	8
Rankings from AP Poll

The 2004 Navy Midshipmen football team represented the United States Naval Academy (USNA) as an independent during the 2004 NCAA Division I-A football season. The team was led by third-year head coach Paul Johnson. The Midshipmen finished the regular season with a 9–2 record, the first time since the 1963 season that Navy had won nine or more games in a season. Wins over Army and the Air Force Falcons secured Navy's second consecutive Commander-in-Chief's Trophy. Navy secured a berth in the 2004 Emerald Bowl when the Pacific-10 Conference did not have enough teams to fill its bowl obligations. The other tie-in was with the Mountain West Conference (MWC), and the Midshipmen ended up playing the New Mexico Lobos. They won the game with a score of 34–19, finishing with a 14-minute, 26-play drive that set the record for the longest drive in a college football game. The win gave the Midshipmen a final record of 10–2, the first time since the 1905 season that the Midshipmen finished with ten or more wins.

== Schedule ==
Date	Time	Opponent	Site	TV	Result	Attendance
September 4	6:00 p.m.	Duke	Navy–Marine Corps Memorial Stadium; Annapolis, MD	HDNet	W 27–12	29,027
September 11		Northeastern	Navy–Marine Corps Memorial Stadium; Annapolis, MD	CN8	W 28–24	
September 18	7:00 p.m.	at Tulsa	Skelly Stadium; Tulsa, OK		W 29–0	23,658
September 25	1:30 p.m.	Vanderbilt	Navy–Marine Corps Memorial Stadium; Annapolis, MD	HDNet	W 29–26	32,809
September 30	7:45 p.m.	at Air Force	Falcon Stadium; Colorado Springs, CO (Commander-in-Chief's Trophy)	ESPN	W 24–21	44,279
October 16	12:00 p.m.	vs. Notre Dame	Giants Stadium; East Rutherford, NJ (rivalry)	CBS	L 9–27	76,166
October 23	1:30 p.m.	Rice	Navy–Marine Corps Memorial Stadium; Annapolis, MD	HDNet	W 14–13	31,117
October 30	1:30 p.m.	No. 3 (I-AA) Delaware	Navy–Marine Corps Memorial Stadium; Annapolis, MD	CN8	W 34–20	34,416
November 6	7:00 p.m.	at Tulane	Louisiana Superdome; New Orleans, LA		L 10–42	21,484
November 20	1:30 p.m.	Rutgers	Navy–Marine Corps Memorial Stadium; Annapolis, MD	CSTV	W 54–21	33,615
December 4		vs. Army	Lincoln Financial Field; Philadelphia, PA (Army–Navy Game)	CBS	W 42–13	
December 30	4:30 p.m.	vs. New Mexico	SBC Park; San Francisco, CA (Emerald Bowl)	ESPN2	W 34–19	30,563
Rankings from AP Poll released prior to the game; All times are in Eastern time
