= 2004 Louisville Cardinals football team =

American college football season

2004 Louisville Cardinals football

Conference USA champion Liberty Bowl champion

Liberty Bowl, W 44–40 vs. Boise State
- Conference: Conference USA

Ranking
- Coaches: No. 7
- AP: No. 6
- Record: 11–1 (8–0 C-USA)
- Head coach: Bobby Petrino (2nd season)
- Offensive coordinator: Paul Petrino (2nd season)
- Offensive scheme: Multiple
- Defensive coordinator: Mike Cassity (1st season)
- Base defense: 4–3
- Home stadium: Papa John's Cardinal Stadium

2004 Conference USA football standings
	Conf.			Overall
Team	W		L	W		L
No. 6 Louisville $	8	–	0	11	–	1
Memphis	5	–	3	8	–	4
Southern Miss	5	–	3	7	–	5
Cincinnati	5	–	3	7	–	5
UAB	5	–	3	7	–	5
TCU	3	–	5	5	–	6
Tulane	3	–	5	5	–	6
South Florida	3	–	5	4	–	7
Houston	3	–	5	3	–	8
East Carolina	2	–	6	2	–	9
Army	2	–	6	2	–	9
$ – Conference champion; Rankings from AP Poll

The 2004 Louisville Cardinals football team represented the University of Louisville in the 2004 NCAA Division I-A football season. The team, led by Bobby Petrino in his second year at the school, played their home games in Papa John's Cardinal Stadium. They finished 11–1 and were the Conference USA champions with a perfect 8–0 conference record in their last season before leaving to join the Big East Conference. They were invited to and won the Liberty Bowl, defeating Western Athletic Conference champion Boise State 44–40.

== Schedule ==
Date	Time	Opponent	Rank	Site	TV	Result	Attendance	Source
September 5	3:30 pm	Kentucky*		Papa John's Cardinal Stadium; Louisville, KY (Governor's Cup)	ESPN	W 28–0	42,681	
September 11	1:00 pm	at Army		Michie Stadium; [West Point, NY	WDRB	W 52–21	28,130	
September 25	1:30 pm	at North Carolina*	No. 24	Kenan Memorial Stadium; Chapel Hill, NC	ESPN Plus	W 34–0	49,000	
October 2	3:00 pm	East Carolina	No. 22	Papa John's Cardinal Stadium; Louisville, KY	ESPN Plus	W 59–7	40,220	
October 14	7:30 pm	at No. 3 Miami (FL)*	No. 18	Miami Orange Bowl; Miami, FL (rivalry)	ESPN	L 38–41	63,715	
October 22	8:00 pm	South Florida	No. 15	Papa John's Cardinal Stadium; Louisville, KY	ESPN	W 41–9	42,032	
November 4	7:30 pm	at Memphis	No. 14	Liberty Bowl Memorial Stadium; Memphis, TN (rivalry)	ESPN	W 56–49	52,384	
November 10	7:30 pm	TCU	No. 12	Papa John's Cardinal Stadium; Louisville, KY	ESPN2	W 55–28	40,107	
November 20	5:00 pm	at Houston	No. 8	Robertson Stadium; Houston, TX	ESPN Plus	W 65–27	20,176	
November 27	2:30 pm	Cincinnati	No. 7	Papa John's Cardinal Stadium; Louisville, KY (The Keg of Nails)	ESPN2	W 70–7	37,617	
December 4	2:30 pm	at Tulane	No. 7	Louisiana Superdome; New Orleans, LA	ESPN Plus	W 55–7	22,169	
December 31	3:30 pm	vs. No. 10 Boise State*	No. 7	Liberty Bowl Memorial Stadium; Memphis, TN (Liberty Bowl)	ESPN	W 44–40	58,355	
*Non-conference game; Rankings from AP Poll released prior to the game; All times are in Eastern time

== Game summaries ==
=== At Miami (FL) ===
#18 Louisville at #3 Miami (FL)

Team	1	2	3	4	Total
Louisville	7	17	7	7	38
• Miami (FL)	7	0	14	20	41

- Date: October 14
- Location: Orange Bowl
- Game start: 7:30 p.m. EST
- Source: ESPN

Scoring summary
1	5:22	MIA	Greg Olsen 9-yard pass from Brock Berlin (Jon Peattie kick)	MIA 7–0
1	1:53	LOU	Lionel Gates 1-yard run (Arthur Carmody kick)	Tied 7–7
2	14:56	LOU	Arthur Carmody 31-yard field goal	LOU 10–7
2	10:03	LOU	Tiger Jones 12-yard pass from Stefan LeFors (Arthur Carmody kick)	LOU 17–7
2	1:29	LOU	Lionel Gates 17-yard pass from Stefan LeFors (Arthur Carmody kick)	LOU 24–7
3	9:51	MIA	Roscoe Parrish 14-yard pass from Brock Berlin (Jon Peattie kick)	LOU 24–14
3	6:42	LOU	Tiger Jones 22-yard pass from Stefan LeFors (Arthur Carmody kick)	LOU 31–14
3	4:08	MIA	Akieem Jolla 11-yard pass from Brock Berlin (Jon Peattie kick)	LOU 31–21
4	14:53	MIA	Jon Peattie 24-yard field goal	LOU 31–24
4	12:03	MIA	Jon Peattie 32-yard field goal	LOU 31–27
4	8:11	MIA	Devin Hester 78-yard punt return (Jon Peattie kick)	MIA 34–31
4	4:30	LOU	Lionel Gates 1-yard run (Arthur Carmody kick)	LOU 38–34
4	0:49	MIA	Frank Gore 1-yard run (Jon Peattie kick)	MIA 41–38

=== Liberty Bowl ===
#10 Boise State vs. #7 Louisville

Team	1	2	3	4	Total
Boise St	10	21	3	6	40
• Louisville	14	7	14	9	44

- Date: Friday December 31
- Location: Liberty Bowl
- Game start: 3:30 p.m. EST
- Source: ESPN

Scoring summary
1	10:49	BSU	Tyler Jones 48-yard field goal	BSU 3–0
1	9:09	LOU	Gary Barnidge 6-yard pass from Stefan LeFors (Arthur Carmody kick)	LOU 7–3
1	0:59	BSU	Andy Avalos 92-yard interception return (Tyler Jones kick)	BSU 10–7
1	0:46	LOU	Harry Douglas 65-yard run (Arthur Carmody kick)	LOU 14–10
2	13:12	LOU	Broderick Clark 30-yard pass from Brian Brohm (Arthur Carmody kick)	LOU 21–10
2	8:52	BSU	Brad Lau recovered offensive fumble in end zone (Tyler Jones kick)	LOU 21–17
2	8:38	BSU	T.J. Acree 19-yard pass from Jared Zabransky (Tyler Jones kick)	BSU 24–21
2	0:15	BSU	Jared Zabransky 1-yard run (Tyler Jones kick)	BSU 31–21
3	9:05	BSU	Tyler Jones 42-yard field goal	BSU 34–21
3	6:06	LOU	J.R. Russell 14-yard pass from Stefan LeFors (Arthur Carmody kick)	BSU 34–28
3	2:17	LOU	Stefan LeFors 1-yard run (Arthur Carmody kick)	LOU 35–34
4	10:51	BSU	Jon Helmandollar (pass failed)	BSU 40–35
4	6:48	LOU	Eric Shelton 1-yard run (pass failed)	LOU 41–40
4	1:10	LOU	Arthur Carmody 19-yard field goal	LOU 44–40

== Coaching staff ==
2004 Louisville Cardinals coaching staff
Name	Position
Bobby Petrino	Head coach
Greg Nord	Assistant head coach / tight ends / running backs coach
Mike Cassity	Defensive coordinator / safeties coach
Paul Petrino	Offensive coordinator / wide receivers coach
Jeff Brohm	Quarterbacks coach
Reggie Johnson	Inside Linebackers coach
Tony Levine	Outside linebackers coach / special teams coordinator
Mike Summers	Offensive line Coach
Joe Whitt Jr.	Cornerbacks coach / recruiting coordinator
Kevin Wolthausen	Defensive line Coach
