= 2004 UTEP Miners football team =

American college football season

2004 UTEP Miners football

Houston Bowl, L 28–33 vs. Colorado
- Conference: Western Athletic Conference
- Record: 8–4 (6–2 WAC)
- Head coach: Mike Price (1st season)
- Offensive coordinator: Eric Price (1st season)
- Offensive scheme: Spread
- Defensive coordinator: Tim Hundley (1st season)
- Base defense: Multiple
- Home stadium: Sun Bowl

2004 Western Athletic Conference football standings
	Conf.			Overall
Team	W		L	W		L
No. 12 Boise State $	8	–	0	11	–	1
UTEP	6	–	2	8	–	4
No. 22 Fresno State	5	–	3	9	–	3
Louisiana Tech	5	–	3	6	–	6
Hawaii	4	–	4	8	–	5
Nevada	3	–	5	5	–	7
Tulsa	3	–	5	4	–	8
SMU	3	–	5	3	–	8
Rice	2	–	6	3	–	8
San Jose State	1	–	7	2	–	9
$ – Conference champion; Rankings from AP Poll

The 2004 UTEP Miners football team represented the University of Texas at El Paso (UTEP) as a member of the Western Athletic Conference (WAC) during the 2004 NCAA Division I-A football season. Led by first-year head coach Mike Price, the Miners compiled an overall record of 8–4 with a mark of 6–2 in conference play, placing second in the WAC. UTEP was invited to the Houston Bowl, where the Miners lost to Colorado. The team played home games at the Sun Bowl in El Paso, Texas.

This was UTEP's final season competing in the WAC as the Miners joined Conference USA in 2005.

== Schedule ==
Date	Time	Opponent	Rank	Site	TV	Result	Attendance	Source
September 2	8:00 pm	at Arizona State*		Sun Devil Stadium; Tempe, AZ	TWCEP	L 9–41	57,528	
September 11	7:05 pm	Weber State*		Sun Bowl; El Paso, TX		W 32–0	34,229	
September 18	7:05 pm	No. 23 Boise State		Sun Bowl; El Paso, TX	SPW	L 31–47	33,921	
October 2	7:05 pm	New Mexico State*		Sun Bowl; El Paso, TX (Battle of I-10)		W 45–0	46,123	
October 9	8:00 pm	at Fresno State		Bulldog Stadium; Fresno, CA	ESPNGP	W 24–21	40,407	
October 16	7:05 pm	Hawaii^{†}		Sun Bowl; El Paso, TX	ESPN Plus	W 51-20	44,381	
October 23	1:00 pm	at Louisiana Tech		Joe Aillet Stadium; Ruston, LA	SPW	W 44–27	18,103	
October 30	3:00 pm	at San Jose State		Spartan Stadium; San Jose, CA	TWCEP	W 38–20	5,968	
November 13	7:05 pm	Rice	No. 23	Sun Bowl; El Paso, TX		W 35–28 ^{2OT}	43,507	
November 20	3:05 pm	SMU	No. 24	Sun Bowl; El Paso, TX		W 57–27	45,095	
November 27	1:00 pm	at Tulsa	No. 24	Skelly Stadium; Tulsa, OK	TWCEP	L 35–37	10,977	
December 29	2:30 pm	vs. Colorado*		Reliant Stadium; Houston, TX (Houston Bowl)	ESPN	L 28–33	27,235	
*Non-conference game; ^{†}Homecoming; Rankings from AP Poll released prior to the game; All times are in Mountain time
