= Cam Hall =

American gridiron football player (born 1982)

Profile
- Position: Linebacker

Personal information
- Born: November 1, 1982 (age 44); Richland, Washington, U.S.
- Listed height: 6 ft 0 in (1.83 m)
- Listed weight: 222 lb (101 kg)

Career information
- College: Boise State

Career history
- 2007–2008: Winnipeg Blue Bombers
- 2009: Montreal Alouettes*
- * Offseason or practice squad member only
- Stats at CFL.ca

Cam Hall (born November 1, 1982) is an American former professional football linebacker. He was signed by the Winnipeg Blue Bombers as an undrafted free agent in 2008. He played college football at Boise State.

Hall was also a member of the Montreal Alouettes.
