= 2004 Boise State Broncos football team =

American college football season

2004 Boise State Broncos football

WAC champion

Liberty Bowl, L 40–44 vs. Louisville
- Conference: Western Athletic Conference

Ranking
- Coaches: No. 13
- AP: No. 12
- Record: 11–1 (8–0 WAC)
- Head coach: Dan Hawkins (4th season)
- Offensive coordinator: Chris Petersen (4th season)
- Defensive coordinator: Ron Collins
- Home stadium: Bronco Stadium

2004 Western Athletic Conference football standings
	Conf.			Overall
Team	W		L	W		L
No. 12 Boise State $	8	–	0	11	–	1
UTEP	6	–	2	8	–	4
No. 22 Fresno State	5	–	3	9	–	3
Louisiana Tech	5	–	3	6	–	6
Hawaii	4	–	4	8	–	5
Nevada	3	–	5	5	–	7
Tulsa	3	–	5	4	–	8
SMU	3	–	5	3	–	8
Rice	2	–	6	3	–	8
San Jose State	1	–	7	2	–	9
$ – Conference champion; Rankings from AP Poll

The 2004 Boise State Broncos football team represented Boise State University in the 2004 NCAA Division I-A football season. Boise State competed as a member of the Western Athletic Conference (WAC), and played their home games at Bronco Stadium in Boise, Idaho. The Broncos were led by fourth-year head coach Dan Hawkins. The Broncos finished the season 11–1 and 8–0 in conference (went undefeated 11–0 in the regular season) to win their third straight WAC title and played in the Liberty Bowl, where they lost to Louisville, 44–40.

== Schedule ==
Date	Time	Opponent	Rank	Site	TV	Result	Attendance
September 4	6:05 pm	Idaho*		Bronco Stadium; Boise, ID (Governor's Trophy)		W 65–7	30,944
September 10	8:00 pm	Oregon State*		Bronco Stadium; Boise, ID	ESPN	W 53–34	30,950
September 18	7:05 pm	at UTEP	No. 23	Sun Bowl; El Paso, TX	SPW	W 47–31	33,921
September 25	8:00 pm	BYU*	No. 21	Bronco Stadium; Boise, ID	ESPN	W 28–27	30,601
October 1	6:05 pm	SMU^{†}	No. 23	Bronco Stadium; Boise, ID	SPW	W 38–20	30,322
October 16	6:00 pm	at Tulsa	No. 21	Skelly Stadium; Tulsa, OK		W 45–42	20,817
October 23	8:15 pm	Fresno State	No. 19	Bronco Stadium; Boise, ID (rivalry)	ESPN2	W 33–16	30,623
October 29	6:00 pm	Hawaii	No. 18	Bronco Stadium; Boise, ID	ESPN2	W 69–3	29,591
November 13	10:00 am	at San Jose State	No. 14	Spartan Stadium; San Jose, CA	ESPN2	W 56–49 ^{2OT}	28,867
November 20	1:05 pm	Louisiana Tech	No. 13	Bronco Stadium; Boise, ID	ESPN+	W 55–14	30,462
November 27	5:45 pm	at Nevada	No. 10	Mackay Stadium; Reno, NV	ESPN	W 58–21	10,151
December 31	1:30 pm	vs. No. 7 Louisville*	No. 10	Liberty Bowl; Memphis, TN (Liberty Bowl)	ESPN	L 40–44	58,355
*Non-conference game; ^{†}Homecoming; Rankings from AP Poll released prior to the game; All times are in Mountain time

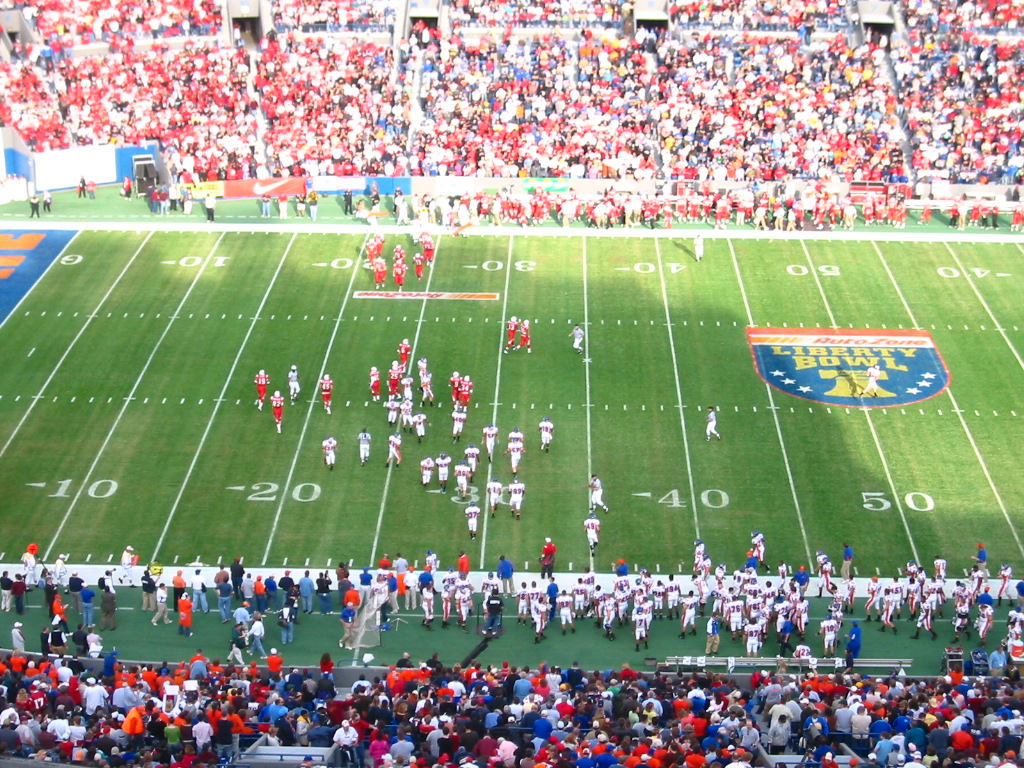
Boise State and Louisville square off in the 2004 Liberty Bowl in Memphis, Tennessee.
