= Alvin Nnabuife =

American football player (born 1983)

Profile
- Positions: Cornerback, Safety, Linebacker

Personal information
- Born: April 3, 1983; Missouri City, Texas

Career information
- College: Southern Methodist

Career history
- 2006: Oakland Raiders*
- 2006-2007: Green Bay Packers*
- 2007: Cologne Centurions
- * Offseason or practice squad member only

Alvin Nnabuife (pronounced "na-boo-fee") (born April 3, 1983) is an American football player who has played at the linebacker, safety and cornerback positions for the SMU Mustangs (2001, 2003–2004), the Green Bay Packers (2006), and the Cologne Centurions (2007). He holds the NCAA record for most fumbles returned for a touchdown in a single game, having returned two fumbles for touchdowns in a single quarter in 2003.

== Biography ==
Nnabuife was born in Missouri City, Texas, near Houston. As a senior in high school, he received first-team All-District honors after recording 82 tackles and six pass break-ups during the 2000 season. Nnabuife also blocked six kicks during his senior year and lettered in track as well as football.

Nnabuife played for SMU as a freshman in 2001, appearing in all 11 games for the Mustangs. After missing most of the 2002 season as a medical redshirt, he played in all 12 games as a sophomore in 2003. He recorded 71 tackles as a sophomore.

As a junior in 2003, Nnabuife had a breakout season and became one of the top defensive football players in Conference USA. After being moved from safety to linebacker, he led the 2003 SMU Mustangs football team with 80 tackles and was named the team's Defensive MVP. He also earned honorable mention All-Conference honors. In a November 2003 game against Nevada, Nnabuife tied an NCAA record with two fumble returns for touchdown in the same game—one for 95 yards and another for 17 yards. Both fumble returns against Nevada came in the third quarter. The record was set while Nnabuife was playing in only his second game at linebacker, and the 95-yard fumble return also set a school record for the longest fumble return. Nnabuife also had 12 tackles and returned an interception for a touchdown against Boise State in 2003. In SMU's 2003 game against Rice, Nnabuife had a team-season-high 17 tackles.

In July 2005, College Football News named Nnabuife to its pre-season All-Conference USA team at the defensive end position. The publication ranked Nnabuife as the 14th best player in Conference USA. In his senior year, Nnabuife recorded 53 total tackles and tied for first on team with four interceptions for team-high 119 in return yards.

In May 2006, Nnabuife signed as an undrafted free agent with the Oakland Raiders. After being released by Oakland, he signed with the Green Bay Packers in October 2006 and became part of the team's practice squad. He made his first big play with the Packers when he intercepted a forward pass deep thrown deep downfield by quarterback Aaron Rodgers. However, he did not play in any regular season games with the Packers and in February 2007 the Packers allocated him to the Cologne Centurions of the NFL Europe. Nnabuife made the roster of the Centurions for the 2007 season. In September 2007, Nnabuife was released by the Packers organization.

His younger brother Bryant Nnabuife played college football for Blinn College (2007) and the University of California, Berkeley (2008–2010). He also play professional football for the Arizona Cardinals, Toronto Argonauts and the Spokane Shocks.
