= 2004 NCAA Division I-A football rankings =

- Season: 2004
- Bowl season: 2004–05 bowl games
- Preseason No. 1: USC
- End of season champions: USC
- Conference with most teams in final AP poll: ACC, Big 10, SEC (4)

Two human polls and one formulaic ranking make up the 2004 NCAA Division I-A football rankings. Unlike most sports, college football's governing body, the National Collegiate Athletic Association (NCAA), does not bestow a National Championship title for Division I-A football. That title is primarily bestowed by different polling agencies. There are several polls that currently exist. The main weekly polls are the AP Poll and Coaches Poll. About halfway through the season the Bowl Championship Series (BCS) standings are released.

== Legend ==
| | Increase in ranking |
| | Decrease in ranking |
| | Not ranked previous week |
| | Selected for BCS National Championship Game |
| (#–#) | Win–loss record |
| (Italics) | Number of first place votes |
| т | Tied with team above or below also with this symbol |

== AP Poll ==
This season would be the last season that the AP Poll would be included in the BCS formula. The heavy end of the season politicking for ballot position lead the AP to believe that the BCS undermined the independence and integrity of the poll and could hurt the AP's reputation.

| | Preseason Aug 19 | Week 1 Sept 5 | Week 2 Sept 12 | Week 3 Sept 19 | Week 4 Sept 26 | Week 5 Oct 3 | Week 6 Oct 10 | Week 7 Oct 17 | Week 8 Oct 24 | Week 9 Oct 31 | Week 10 Nov 7 | Week 11 Nov 14 | Week 12 Nov 21 | Week 13 Nov 28 | Week 14 Dec 5 | Week 15 (Final) Jan 5 | |
| 1. | USC (48) | USC (1–0) (51) | USC (2–0) (52) | USC (3–0) (54) | USC (4–0) (46) | USC (4–0) (48) | USC (5–0) (41) | USC (6–0) (50) | USC (7–0) (50) | USC (8–0) (56) | USC (9–0) (52) | USC (10–0) (51) | USC (10–0) (48) | USC (11–0) (52) | USC (12–0) (44) | USC (13–0) (62) | 1. |
| 2. | Oklahoma (11) | Oklahoma (1–0) (10) | Oklahoma (2–0) (10) | Oklahoma (3–0) (10) | Oklahoma (3–0) (18) | Oklahoma (4–0) (15) | Oklahoma (5–0) (23) | Oklahoma (6–0) (13) | Oklahoma (7–0) (13) | Oklahoma (8–0) (8) | Oklahoma (9–0) (10) | Oklahoma (10–0) (8) т | Oklahoma (11–0) (9) | Oklahoma (11–0) (7) | Oklahoma (12–0) (16) | Auburn (13–0) (3) | 2. |
| 3. | Georgia (5) | Georgia (1–0) (4) | Georgia (2–0) (3) | Georgia (3–0) (1) | Georgia (3–0) (1) | Georgia (4–0) (2) | Miami (FL) (4–0) | Auburn (7–0) (2) | Auburn (8–0) (2) | Auburn (9–0) (1) | Auburn (9–0) (3) | Auburn (10–0) (6) т | Auburn (11–0) (8) | Auburn (11–0) (6) | Auburn (12–0) (7) | Oklahoma (12–1) | 3. |
| 4. | LSU (1) | Florida State (0–0) | Miami (FL) (1–0) | Miami (FL) (2–0) | Miami (FL) (3–0) | Miami (FL) (4–0) | Auburn (6–0) | Miami (FL) (5–0) | Miami (FL) (6–0) | California (6–1) | Wisconsin (9–0) | California (8–1) | California (9–1) | California (9–1) | California (10–1) | Utah (12–0) | 4. |
| 5. | Florida State | Miami (FL) (0–0) | LSU (2–0) | Texas (2–0) | Texas (3–0) | Texas (4–0) | Purdue (5–0) | Florida State (5–1) | Florida State (6–1) | Wisconsin (8–0) | California (7–1) | Utah (10–0) | Utah (11–0) | Utah (11–0) | Utah (11–0) | Texas (11–1) | 5. |
| 6. | Miami (FL) | LSU (1–0) | Texas (2–0) | West Virginia (3–0) | West Virginia (4–0) | Auburn (5–0) | Virginia (5–0) | Wisconsin (7–0) | Wisconsin (8–0) | Texas (7–1) | Texas (8–1) | Texas (9–1) | Texas (9–1) | Texas (10–1) | Texas (10–1) | Louisville (11–1) | 6. |
| 7. | Texas | Texas (1–0) | West Virginia (2–0) | Ohio State (3–0) | Ohio State (3–0) | California (3–0) | Florida State (4–1) | California (4–1) | California (5–1) | Utah (8–0) | Utah (9–0) | Michigan (9–1) | Louisville (8–1) | Louisville (9–1) | Louisville (10–1) | Georgia (10–2) | 7. |
| 8. | Michigan | Michigan (1–0) | Florida State (0–1) | Florida State (1–1) | Auburn (4–0) | Florida State (3–1) | California (3–1) | Texas (5–1) | Texas (6–1) | Georgia (7–1) | Georgia (8–1) | Louisville (7–1) | Georgia (8–2) | Georgia (9–2) | Georgia (9–2) | Iowa (10–2) | 8. |
| 9. | Ohio State | Ohio State (1–0) | Ohio State (2–0) | Auburn (3–0) | Florida State (2–1) | Purdue (4–0) | Texas (4–1) | Utah (6–0) | Utah (7–0) | Tennessee (7–1) | Michigan (8–1) | Wisconsin (9–1) | Miami (FL) (8–2) | Miami (FL) (8–2) | Virginia Tech (10–2) | California (10–2) | 9. |
| 10. | West Virginia | West Virginia (1–0) | California (2–0) | California (2–0) | California (2–0) | Virginia (4–0) | Wisconsin (6–0) | Georgia (5–1) | Georgia (6–1) | Michigan (8–1) | Virginia (7–1) | Florida State (8–2) | Boise State (10–0) | Virginia Tech (9–2) | Boise State (11–0) | Virginia Tech (10–3) | 10. |
| 11. | Florida | Florida (0–0) | Florida (1–0) | Tennessee (2–0) | Tennessee (3–0) | Utah (5–0) | Utah (5–0) | Tennessee (5–1) | Tennessee (6–1) | Miami (FL) (6–1) | Florida State (7–2) | Georgia (8–2) | Virginia Tech (8–2) | Boise State (11–0) | Iowa (9–2) | Miami (FL) (9–3) | 11. |
| 12. | Kansas State | California (1–0) | Virginia (2–0) | Virginia (3–0) | Virginia (4–0) | Florida (3–1) | Georgia (4–1) | Purdue (5–1) | Michigan (7–1) | Virginia (6–1) | Louisville (6–1) | Miami (FL) (7–2) | Iowa (9–2) | Iowa (9–2) | LSU (9–2) | Boise State (11–1) | 12. |
| 13. | California | Kansas State (1–0) | Tennessee (1–0) | LSU (2–1) | LSU (3–1) | Minnesota (5–0) | Tennessee (4–1) | Michigan (6–1) | Virginia (6–1) | Florida State (6–2) | West Virginia (8–1) | Boise State (9–0) | Michigan (9–2) | LSU (9–2) | Michigan (9–2) | Tennessee (10–3) | 13. |
| 14. | Tennessee | Tennessee (1–0) | Auburn (2–0) | Utah (3–0) | Utah (4–0) | Michigan (4–1) | Michigan (5–1) | Virginia (5–1) | Louisville (5–1) | Louisville (5–1) | Boise State (8–0) | LSU (7–2) | LSU (8–2) | Michigan (9–2) | Miami (FL) (8–3) | Michigan (9–3) | 14. |
| 15. | Clemson | Virginia (1–0) | Utah (2–0) | Purdue (2–0) | Purdue (3–0) | Wisconsin (5–0) | Arizona State (5–0) | West Virginia (5–1) т | West Virginia (6–1) | West Virginia (7–1) | Tennessee (7–2) | Tennessee (7–2) т | Tennessee (8–2) | Tennessee (9–2) | Tennessee (9–3) | Florida State (9–3) | 15. |
| 16. | Virginia | Iowa (1–0) | Iowa (2–0) | Florida (1–1) | Florida (2–1) | West Virginia (4–1) | Oklahoma State (5–0) | Louisville (4–1) т | Texas A&M (6–1) | Boise State (8–0) | Virginia Tech (7–2) | Virginia Tech (7–2) т | Virginia (8–2) | Florida State (8–3) | Wisconsin (9–2) | LSU (9–3) | 16. |
| 17. | Auburn | Utah (1–0) | Michigan (1–1) | Fresno State (3–0) | Fresno State (3–0) | Tennessee (3–1) | West Virginia (4–1) | Texas A&M (5–1) | Purdue (5–2) | LSU (6–2) | LSU (6–2) | Iowa (8–2) | Boston College (8–2) | Wisconsin (9–2) | Florida State (8–3) | Wisconsin (9–3) | 17. |
| 18. | Missouri | Auburn (1–0) | Purdue (2–0) | Michigan (2–1) | Minnesota (4–0) | Ohio State (3–1) | Louisville (4–0) | LSU (4–2) | Boise State (7–0) | Virginia Tech (6–2) | Miami (FL) (6–2) | Virginia (7–2) | Arizona State (8–2) | Virginia (8–3) | Virginia (8–3) | Texas Tech (8–4) | 18. |
| 19. | Iowa | Missouri (1–0) | Fresno State (2–0) | Minnesota (3–0) | Michigan (3–1) | Arizona State (5–0) | Minnesota (5–1) | Boise State (6–0) | LSU (5–2) | Oklahoma State (6–2) | Iowa (7–2) | Boston College (7–2) | Florida State (8–3) | Pittsburgh (7–3) | Pittsburgh (8–3) | Arizona State (9–3) | 19. |
| 20. | Utah | Clemson (1–0) | Wisconsin (2–0) | Wisconsin (3–0) | Wisconsin (4–0) | Louisville (4–0) | LSU (4–2) | Florida (4–2) | Arizona State (6–1) т | Iowa (6–2) | Arizona State (7–2) | Arizona State (8–2) | Wisconsin (9–2) | Florida (7–4) | Florida (7–4) | Ohio State (8–4) | 20. |
| 21. | Wisconsin | Wisconsin (1–0) | Maryland (2–0) | Boise State (3–0) | Arizona State (4–0) | Boise State (5–0) | Boise State (5–0) | Arizona State (5–1) | Oklahoma State (6–1) т | Southern Miss (5–1) | Boston College (6–2) | West Virginia (8–2) | West Virginia (8–2) | Arizona State (8–3) | Arizona State (8–3) | Boston College (9–3) | 21. |
| 22. | Maryland | Minnesota (1–0) | Minnesota (2–0) | Arizona State (3–0) | Louisville (3–0) | Oklahoma State (4–0) | Florida (3–2) | Oklahoma State (5–1) | Virginia Tech (5–2) | Texas A&M (6–2) | Texas A&M (6–3) | Texas A&M (7–3) | Texas A&M (7–3) | Texas A&M (7–4) | Texas A&M (7–4) | Fresno State (9–3) | 22. |
| 23. | Oregon | Maryland (1–0) | Boise State (2–0) | Maryland (2–1) | Boise State (4–0) | Maryland (3–1) | Texas A&M (4–1) | Virginia Tech (5–2) | Iowa (5–2) | Arizona State (6–2) | UTEP (6–2) | Oklahoma State (7–3) | Oklahoma State (7–3) | Boston College (8–3) | Texas Tech (7–4) | Virginia (8–4) | 23. |
| 24. | Purdue | Oregon (0–0) | Louisville (2–0) | Louisville (2–0) | Maryland (3–1) | LSU (3–2) | Southern Miss (4–0) | Notre Dame (5–2) | Minnesota (6–2) | Boston College (5–2) | Notre Dame (6–3) | UTEP (7–2) | UTEP (8–2) | Texas Tech (7–4) | Ohio State (7–4) | Navy (10–2) | 24. |
| 25. | Minnesota | Purdue (1–0) | Memphis (2–0) | Oklahoma State (3–0) | Oklahoma State (3–0) | South Carolina (4–1) | Ohio State (3–2) | Iowa (4–2) | Southern Miss (5–1) | UTEP (6–2) | Oklahoma State (6–3) | Bowling Green (8–2) | Florida (7–4) | Ohio State (7–4) | Boston College (8–3) | Pittsburgh (8–4) | 25. |
| | Preseason Aug 19 | Week 1 Sept 5 | Week 2 Sept 12 | Week 3 Sept 19 | Week 4 Sept 26 | Week 5 Oct 3 | Week 6 Oct 10 | Week 7 Oct 17 | Week 8 Oct 24 | Week 9 Oct 31 | Week 10 Nov 7 | Week 11 Nov 14 | Week 12 Nov 21 | Week 13 Nov 28 | Week 14 Dec 5 | Week 15 (Final) Jan 5 | |
| | | | Dropped: Kansas State; Missouri; Clemson; Oregon | Dropped: Iowa; Memphis | | Dropped: Fresno State | Dropped: Maryland; South Carolina | Dropped: Minnesota; Southern Miss; Ohio State | Dropped: Florida; Notre Dame | Dropped: Purdue; Minnesota | Dropped: Southern Miss | Dropped: Notre Dame | Dropped: Bowling Green | Dropped: West Virginia; Oklahoma State; UTEP | | Dropped: Florida; Texas A&M | |

== Coaches Poll ==
| | Preseason Aug 19 | Week 1 Sept 5 | Week 2 Sept 12 | Week 3 Sept 19 | Week 4 Sept 26 | Week 5 Oct 3 | Week 6 Oct 10 | Week 7 Oct 17 | Week 8 Oct 24 | Week 9 Oct 31 | Week 10 Nov 7 | Week 11 Nov 14 | Week 12 Nov 21 | Week 13 Nov 28 | Week 14 Dec 5 | Week 15 (Final) Jan 5 | |
| 1. | USC (44) | USC (1–0) (47) | USC (2–0) (47) | USC (3–0) (48) | USC (4–0) (45) | USC (4–0) (46) | USC (5–0) (45) | USC (6–0) (50) | USC (7–0) (49) | USC (8–0) (52) | USC (9–0) (50) | USC (10–0) (51) | USC (10–0) (48) | USC (11–0) (48) | USC (12–0) (35.3) | USC (13–0) (61) | 1. |
| 2. | Oklahoma (12) | Oklahoma (1–0) (10) | Oklahoma (2–0) (11) | Oklahoma (3–0) (12) | Oklahoma (3–0) (14) | Oklahoma (4–0) (12) | Oklahoma (5–0) (15) | Oklahoma (6–0) (10) | Oklahoma (7–0) (11) | Oklahoma (8–0) (8) | Oklahoma (9–0) (10) | Oklahoma (10–0) (6) | Oklahoma (11–0) (7) | Oklahoma (11–0) (6) | Oklahoma (12–0) (16.3) | Auburn (13–0) | 2. |
| 3. | LSU (5) | Georgia (1–0) (3) | Georgia (2–0) (2) | Georgia (3–0) | Georgia (3–0) | Georgia (4–0) (1) | Miami (FL) (4–0) (1) | Miami (FL) (5–0) (1) | Miami (FL) (6–0) (1) | Auburn (9–0) (1) | Auburn (9–0) (1) | Auburn (10–0) (4) | Auburn (11–0) (6) | Auburn (11–0) (7) | Auburn (12–0) (9.3) | Oklahoma (12–1) | 3. |
| 4. | Georgia | LSU (1–0) (1) | LSU (2–0) (1) | Miami (FL) (2–0) (1) | Miami (FL) (3–0) (2) | Miami (FL) (4–0) (2) | Auburn (6–0) | Auburn (7–0) | Auburn (8–0) | Wisconsin (8–0) | Wisconsin (9–0) | California (8–1) | California (9–1) | California (10–1) | California (10–1) | Texas (11–1) | 4. |
| 5. | Miami (FL) | Miami (FL) (0–0) | Miami (FL) (1–0) | Texas (2–0) | Texas (3–0) | Texas (4–0) | Purdue (5–0) | Florida State (5–1) | Florida State (6–1) | Georgia (7–1) | Georgia (8–1) | Texas (9–1) | Texas (9–1) | Texas (10–1) | Texas (10–1) | Utah (12–0) | 5. |
| 6. | Florida State | Florida State (0–0) | Texas (2–0) | Ohio State (3–0) | Ohio State (3–0) | Auburn (5–0) | Virginia (5–0) | Georgia (5–1) | Wisconsin (8–0) | California (6–1) | California (7–1) | Utah (10–0) | Utah (11–0) | Utah (11–0) | Utah (11–0) | Georgia (10–2) | 6. |
| 7. | Michigan | Michigan (1–0) | Ohio State (2–0) | West Virginia (3–0) | West Virginia (4–0) | California (3–0) | Florida State (4–1) | Wisconsin (7–0) | Georgia (6–1) | Texas (7–1) | Texas (8–1) | Michigan (9–1) | Georgia (8–2) | Georgia (9–2) | Georgia (9–2) | Louisville (11–1) | 7. |
| 8. | Texas | Texas (1–0) | West Virginia (2–0) | Tennessee (2–0) | Tennessee (3–0) | Florida State (3–1) | Georgia (4–1) | California (4–1) | California (5–1) | Utah (8–0) | Utah (9–0) | Florida State (8–2) | Louisville (8–1) | Louisville (9–1) | Louisville (10–1) | Iowa (10–2) | 8. |
| 9. | Ohio State | Ohio State (1–0) | Florida (1–0) | California (2–0) | Auburn (4–0) | Virginia (4–0) | California (3–1) | Texas (5–1) | Texas (6–1) | Michigan (8–1) | Michigan (8–1) | Wisconsin (9–1) | Miami (FL) (8–2) | Miami (FL) (8–2) | Virginia Tech (10–2) | California (10–2) | 9. |
| 10. | Florida | West Virginia (1–0) | California (2–0) | Auburn (3–0) | California (2–0) | Purdue (4–0) | Utah (5–0) | Utah (6–0) | Utah (7–0) | Miami (FL) (6–1) | West Virginia (8–1) | Georgia (8–2) | Boise State (10–0) | Boise State (11–0) | Boise State (11–0) | Virginia Tech (10–3) | 10. |
| 11. | West Virginia | Florida (0–0) | Florida State (0–1) | Florida State (1–1) | Florida State (2–1) | Utah (5–0) | Texas (4–1) | Michigan (6–1) | Michigan (7–1) | Tennessee (7–1) | Virginia (7–1) | Louisville (7–1) | Virginia Tech (8–2) | Virginia Tech (9–2) | LSU (9–2) | Miami (FL) (9–3) | 11. |
| 12. | Iowa | Iowa (1–0) | Iowa (2–0) | Virginia (3–0) | Virginia (4–0) | Florida (3–1) | Wisconsin (6–0) | Purdue (5–1) | Tennessee (6–1) | West Virginia (7–1) | Florida State (7–2) | Boise State (9–0) | LSU (8–2) | LSU (9–2) | Michigan (9–2) | Michigan (9–3) | 12. |
| 13. | Kansas State | California (1–0) | Tennessee (1–0) | LSU (2–1) | LSU (3–1) | Minnesota (5–0) | Michigan (5–1) | Tennessee (5–1) | West Virginia (6–1) | Florida State (6–2) т | Boise State (8–0) | Miami (FL) (7–2) | Michigan (9–2) | Michigan (9–2) | Iowa (9–2) | Boise State (11–1) | 13. |
| 14. | Tennessee | Kansas State (1–0) | Utah (2–0) | Utah (3–0) | Utah (4–0) | Michigan (4–1) | Tennessee (4–1) | West Virginia (5–1) | Virginia (6–1) | Virginia (6–1) т | Louisville (6–1) | LSU (7–2) | Iowa (9–2) | Iowa (9–2) | Miami (FL) (8–3) | Florida State (9–3) | 14. |
| 15. | California | Tennessee (1–0) | Auburn (2–0) | Purdue (2–0) | Purdue (3–0) | Ohio State (3–1) | Oklahoma State (5–0) | Virginia (5–1) | Boise State (7–0) | Boise State (8–0) | LSU (6–2) | Virginia Tech (7–2) | Tennessee (8–2) | Tennessee (9–2) | Florida State (8–3) | Tennessee (10–3) | 15. |
| 16. | Clemson | Utah (1–0) | Virginia (2–0) | Florida (1–1) | Florida (2–1) | Wisconsin (5–0) | West Virginia (4–1) | Boise State (6–0) | Louisville (5–1) | Louisville (5–1) | Virginia Tech (7–2) | Tennessee (7–2) | Virginia (8–2) | Florida State (8–3) | Wisconsin (9–2) | LSU (9–3) | 16. |
| 17. | Missouri | Missouri (1–0) | Michigan (1–1) | Fresno State (3–0) | Fresno State (3–0) | Tennessee (3–1) | Louisville (4–0) | LSU (4–2) | Texas A&M (6–1) | LSU (6–2) | Miami (FL) (6–2) | Iowa (8–2) | Florida State (8–3) | Wisconsin (9–2) | Tennessee (9–3) | Texas Tech (8–4) | 17. |
| 18. | Auburn | Clemson (1–0) | Purdue (2–0) | Michigan (2–1) | Michigan (3–1) | West Virginia (4–1) | Boise State (5–0) | Louisville (4–1) | LSU (5–2) | Virginia Tech (6–2) | Tennessee (7–2) | Virginia (7–2) | Wisconsin (9–2) | Virginia (8–3) | Virginia (8–3) | Wisconsin (9–3) | 18. |
| 19. | Virginia | Auburn (1–0) | Maryland (2–0) | Minnesota (3–0) | Minnesota (4–0) | Boise State (5–0) | Arizona State (5–0) | Florida (4–2) | Purdue (5–2) | Oklahoma State (6–2) | Iowa (7–2) | Boston College (7–2) | Boston College (8–2) | Florida (7–4) | Florida (7–4) | Ohio State (8–4) | 19. |
| 20. | Maryland | Virginia (1–0) | Fresno State (2–0) | Wisconsin (3–0) | Wisconsin (4–0) | Louisville (4–0) | Minnesota (5–1) | Texas A&M (5–1) | Oklahoma State (6–1) | Iowa (6–2) | Arizona State (7–2) | West Virginia (8–2) | Arizona State (8–2) | Texas Tech (7–4) | Pittsburgh (8–3) | Arizona State (9–3) | 20. |
| 21. | Utah | Maryland (1–0) | Wisconsin (2–0) | Boise State (3–0) | Boise State (4–0) | Oklahoma State (4–0) | LSU (4–2) | Oklahoma State (5–1) | Arizona State (6–1) | Southern Miss (5–1) | Boston College (6–2) | Arizona State (8–2) | West Virginia (8–2) | Pittsburgh (7–3) | Texas Tech (7–4) | Boston College (9–3) | 21. |
| 22. | Wisconsin | Wisconsin (1–0) | Minnesota (2–0) | Louisville (2–0) | Louisville (3–0) | Arizona State (5–0) | Florida (3–2) | Virginia Tech (5–2) | Virginia Tech (5–2) | Texas A&M (6–2) | Northern Illinois (7–2) | Texas A&M (7–3) | Texas A&M (7–3) | Ohio State (7–4) | Ohio State (7–4) | Fresno State (9–3) | 22. |
| 23. | Minnesota | Purdue (1–0) | Boise State (2–0) | Maryland (2–1) | Maryland (3–1) | Maryland (3–1) | Ohio State (3–2) | Arizona State (5–1) | Minnesota (6–2) | Arizona State (6–2) | Texas A&M (6–3) | Oklahoma State (7–3) | Oklahoma State (7–3) | Arizona State (8–3) | West Virginia (8–3) | Virginia (8–4) | 23. |
| 24. | Purdue | Minnesota (1–0) | Louisville (2–0) | Iowa (2–1) | Oklahoma State (3–0) | LSU (3–2) | Missouri (4–1) | Texas Tech (4–2) | Iowa (5–2) | Northern Illinois (7–2) | Oklahoma State (6–3) | Bowling Green (8–2) | Bowling Green (8–2) | West Virginia (8–3) | Arizona State (8–3) | Navy (10–2) | 24. |
| 25. | Oregon | Oregon (0–0) | Clemson (1–1) | Oklahoma State (3–0) | Arizona State (4–0) | NC State (3–1) | Southern Miss (4–0) | Notre Dame (5–2) | Southern Miss (5–1) | Boston College (5–2) | Texas Tech (6–3) | UTEP (7–2) | UTEP (8–2) | Texas A&M (7–4) | Texas A&M (7–4) | Florida (7–5) | 25. |
| | Preseason Aug 19 | Week 1 Sept 5 | Week 2 Sept 12 | Week 3 Sept 19 | Week 4 Sept 26 | Week 5 Oct 3 | Week 6 Oct 10 | Week 7 Oct 17 | Week 8 Oct 24 | Week 9 Oct 31 | Week 10 Nov 7 | Week 11 Nov 14 | Week 12 Nov 21 | Week 13 Nov 28 | Week 14 Dec 5 | Week 15 (Final) Jan 5 | |
| | | | Dropped: Missouri; Oregon | Dropped: Clemson | Dropped: Iowa | Dropped: Fresno State | Dropped: Maryland; NC State | Dropped: Florida; Minnesota; Missouri; Southern Miss | Dropped: Notre Dame; Texas Tech | Dropped: Minnesota; Purdue | Dropped: Southern Miss | Dropped: Northern Illinois; Texas Tech | | Dropped: Boston College; Oklahoma State; Bowling Green; UTEP | | Dropped: Pittsburgh; West Virginia; Texas A&M | |

== BCS standings ==
The Bowl Championship Series (BCS) determined the two teams that competed in the BCS National Championship Game, the 2005 Orange Bowl.

| | Week 7 Oct 18 | Week 8 Oct 25 | Week 9 Nov 1 | Week 10 Nov 8 | Week 11 Nov 15 | Week 12 Nov 22 | Week 13 Nov 29 | Week 14 (Final) Dec 5 | |
| 1. | USC (6–0) | USC (7–0) | USC (8–0) | USC (9–0) | USC (10–0) | USC (10–0) | USC (11–0) | USC (12–0) | 1. |
| 2. | Miami (FL) (5–0) | Oklahoma (6–0) | Oklahoma (7–0) | Oklahoma (8–0) | Oklahoma (9–0) | Oklahoma (10–0) | Oklahoma (11–0) | Oklahoma (12–0) | 2. |
| 3. | Oklahoma (6–0) | Miami (FL) (6–0) | Auburn (9–0) | Auburn (9–0) | Auburn (10–0) | Auburn (11–0) | Auburn (11–0) | Auburn (12–0) | 3. |
| 4. | Auburn (7–0) | Auburn (8–0) | California (6–1) | California (7–1) | California (8–1) | California (9–1) | California (10–1) | Texas (10–1) | 4. |
| 5. | Florida State (5–1) | Florida State (6–1) | Wisconsin (8–0) | Wisconsin (9–0) | Texas (9–1) | Texas (9–1) | Texas (10–1) | California (10–1) | 5. |
| 6. | Wisconsin (7–0) | Utah (7–0) | Utah (8–0) | Texas (8–1) | Utah (10–0) | Utah (11–0) | Utah (11–0) | Utah (11–0) | 6. |
| 7. | Utah (6–0) | Wisconsin (8–0) | Texas (7–1) | Utah (9–0) | Michigan (9–1) | Boise State (10–0) | Georgia (9–2) | Georgia (9–2) | 7. |
| 8. | California (4–1) | California (5–1) | Tennessee (7–1) | Georgia (8–1) | Florida State (8–2) | Georgia (8–2) | Boise State (11–0) | Virginia Tech (10–2) | 8. |
| 9. | Tennessee (5–1) | Georgia (6–1) | Georgia (7–1) | Michigan (8–1) | Boise State (9–0) | Miami (FL) (8–2) | Louisville (9–1) | Boise State (11–0) | 9. |
| 10. | Georgia (5–1) | Texas (6–1) | Miami (FL) (6–1) | Boise State (8–0) | Louisville (7–1) | Louisville (8–1) | Miami (FL) (8–2) | Louisville (10–1) | 10. |
| 11. | Texas (5–1) | Tennessee (6–1) | Michigan (8–1) | Virginia (7–1) | Georgia (8–2) | Iowa (9–2) | LSU (9–2) | LSU (9–2) | 11. |
| 12. | Purdue (5–1) | Michigan (7–1) | Boise State (8–0) | Florida State (7–2) | Miami (FL) (7–2) | Michigan (9–2) | Virginia Tech (9–2) | Iowa (9–2) | 12. |
| 13. | Michigan (6–1) | Boise State (7–0) | Florida State (6–2) | West Virginia (8–1) | Wisconsin (9–1) | LSU (8–2) | Iowa (9–2) | Michigan (9–2) | 13. |
| 14. | Boise State (6–0) | Texas A&M (6–1) | Virginia (6–1) | Louisville (6–1) | Arizona State (8–2) | Virginia Tech (8–2) | Michigan (9–2) | Miami (FL) (8–3) | 14. |
| 15. | Virginia (5–1) | Arizona State (6–1) | Louisville (5–1) | Tennessee (7–2) | Virginia Tech (7–2) | Tennessee (8–2) | Tennessee (9–2) | Tennessee (9–3) | 15. |
| 16. | Texas A&M (5–1) | Virginia (6–1) | West Virginia (7–1) | Arizona State (7–2) | LSU (7–2) | Arizona State (8–2) | Florida State (8–3) | Florida State (8–3) | 16. |
| 17. | Louisville (4–1) | Louisville (5–1) | LSU (6–2) | Miami (FL) (6–2) | Tennessee (7–2) | Virginia (8–2) | Wisconsin (9–2) | Wisconsin (9–2) | 17. |
| 18. | Arizona State (5–1) | West Virginia (6–1) | Arizona State (6–2) | Virginia Tech (7–2) | Iowa (8–2) | Florida State (8–3) | Virginia (8–3) | Virginia (8–3) | 18. |
| 19. | LSU (4–2) | Oklahoma State (6–1) | Oklahoma State (6–2) | LSU (6–2) | Virginia (7–2) | Texas A&M (7–3) | Arizona State (8–3) | Arizona State (8–3) | 19. |
| 20. | West Virginia (5–1) | LSU (5–2) | Virginia Tech (6–2) | Iowa (7–2) | Texas A&M (7–3) | Wisconsin (9–2) | Texas A&M (7–4) | Texas A&M (7–4) | 20. |
| 21. | Oklahoma State (5–1) | Purdue (5–2) | Iowa (6–2) | Texas A&M (6–3) | Boston College (7–2) | Boston College (8–2) | Texas Tech (7–4) | Pittsburgh (8–3) | 21. |
| 22. | Florida (4–2) | Virginia Tech (5–2) | Texas A&M (6–2) | Oklahoma State (6–3) | Oklahoma State (6–3) | Oklahoma State (7–3) | Florida (7–4) | Texas Tech (7–4) | 22. |
| 23. | Notre Dame (5–2) | Iowa (5–2) | Southern Miss (5–1) | Boston College (6–2) | West Virginia (8–2) | West Virginia (8–2) | Pittsburgh (7–3) | Florida (7–4) | 23. |
| 24. | UAB (5–1) | UTEP (5–2) | UTEP (6–2) | UTEP (6–2) | UTEP (7–2) | UTEP (8–2) | Oklahoma State (7–4) | Oklahoma State (7–4) | 24. |
| 25. | Virginia Tech (5–2) | Minnesota (6–2) | Boston College (6–2) | Notre Dame (6–3) | Bowling Green (8–2) | Bowling Green (8–2) | Ohio State (7–4) | Ohio State (7–4) | 25. |
| | Week 8 Oct 18 | Week 9 Oct 25 | Week 10 Nov 1 | Week 11 Nov 8 | Week 12 Nov 15 | Week 13 Nov 22 | Week 14 Nov 29 | Week 15 (Final) Dec 5 | |
| | | Dropped: Florida; Notre Dame; UAB | Dropped: Purdue; Minnesota | Dropped: Southern Miss | Dropped: Notre Dame | | Dropped: West Virginia; Boston College; UTEP; Bowling Green | | |
