= 2004 Texas Tech Red Raiders football team =

American college football season

2004 Texas Tech Red Raiders football

Holiday Bowl champion

Holiday Bowl, W 45–31 vs. California
- Conference: Big 12 Conference
- South Division

Ranking
- Coaches: No. 17
- AP: No. 18
- Record: 8–4 (5–3 Big 12)
- Head coach: Mike Leach (5th season)
- Offensive scheme: Air raid
- Defensive coordinator: Lyle Setencich (2nd season)
- Base defense: 3–4
- Home stadium: Jones SBC Stadium

2004 Big 12 Conference football standings
	Conf.			Overall
Team	W		L	W		L
North Division
Colorado xy	4	–	4	8	–	5
Iowa State x	4	–	4	7	–	5
Nebraska	3	–	5	5	–	6
Missouri	3	–	5	5	–	6
Kansas	2	–	6	4	–	7
Kansas State	2	–	6	4	–	7
South Division
No. 3 Oklahoma xy$	8	–	0	12	–	1
No. 5 Texas %	7	–	1	11	–	1
Texas A&M	5	–	3	7	–	5
No. 18 Texas Tech	5	–	3	8	–	4
Oklahoma State	4	–	4	7	–	5
Baylor	1	–	7	3	–	8
Championship: Oklahoma 42, Colorado 3
$ – BCS representative as conference champion; % – BCS at-large representative; x – Division champion/co-champions; y – Championship game participant; Rankings from AP Poll

The 2004 Texas Tech Red Raiders football team represented Texas Tech University as a member of the Big 12 Conference during the 2004 NCAA Division I-A football season. In their fifth season under head coach Mike Leach, the Red Raiders compiled an overall record of 8–4 record with a mark of 5–3 in conference play, finished in a tie for third place in Southern Division of the Big 12, defeated California in the 2004 Holiday Bowl, and outscored opponents by a combined total of 434 to 314. The team played its home games at Jones SBC Stadium in Lubbock, Texas.

The team was led by senior quarterback Sonny Cumbie, who finished the season with 4,742 passing yards, 32 touchdowns, and 18 interceptions, leading the NCAA in passing yards. Cumbie would later serve as an assistant coach for the program starting in 2009, eventually being promoted to co-offensive coordinator in 2013. He would then serve as TCU's offensive coordinator from 2014 to 2020. Cumbie would return to Texas Tech following the 2020 season, being hired as offensive coordinator and quarterbacks coach under head coach Matt Wells. In 2021, Cumbie would be promoted to interim head coach after Wells was fired on October 25.

== Schedule ==
Date	Time	Opponent	Rank	Site	TV	Result	Attendance
September 4	6:00 p.m.	at SMU*		Gerald J. Ford Stadium; University Park, TX		W 27–13	34,689
September 11	6:00 p.m.	at New Mexico*		University Stadium; Albuquerque, NM		L 24–27	38,746
September 18	11:30 a.m.	TCU*		Jones SBC Stadium; Lubbock, TX (rivalry)	FSN	W 70–35	51,271
September 25	2:30 p.m.	at Kansas		Memorial Stadium; Lawrence, KS	FSN	W 31–30	37,422
October 2	11:30 a.m.	at No. 2 Oklahoma		Gaylord Family Oklahoma Memorial Stadium; Norman, OK	FSN	L 13–28	84,580
October 9	6:00 p.m.	Nebraska^{†}		Jones SBC Stadium; Lubbock, TX	TBS	W 70–10	52,594
October 23	6:00 p.m.	No. 8 Texas		Jones SBC Stadium; Lubbock, TX (rivalry)	TBS	L 21–51	55,413
October 30	6:00 p.m.	at Kansas State		KSU Stadium; Manhattan, KS	FSN	W 35–25	48,338
November 6	1:00 p.m.	Baylor		Jones SBC Stadium; Lubbock, TX (rivalry)		W 42–17	53,121
November 13	2:30& p.m.	at No. 22 Texas A&M		Kyle Field; College Station, TX (rivalry)	ABC	L 25–32 ^{OT}	82,278
November 27	2:30 p.m.	No. 23 Oklahoma State		Jones SBC Stadium; Lubbock, TX	FSN	W 31–15	51,717
December 30	7:00 p.m.	vs. No. 4 California*	No. 23	Qualcomm Stadium; San Diego, CA (Holiday Bowl)	ESPN	W 45–31	63,711
*Non-conference game; ^{†}Homecoming; Rankings from AP Poll released prior to the game; All times are in Central time

== Rankings ==
Ranking movements Legend: ██ Increase in ranking ██ Decrease in ranking — = Not ranked RV = Received votes
	Week															
Poll	Pre	1	2	3	4	5	6	7	8	9	10	11	12	13	14	Final
AP	RV	—	—	—	RV	RV	RV	RV	RV	RV	RV	RV	RV	24	23	18
Coaches	RV	—	—	—	RV	RV	RV	24	RV	RV	25	RV	RV	20	21	17
BCS	Not released							—	—	—	—	—	—	21	22	Not released

== Game summaries ==
=== At SMU ===
Texas Tech Red Raiders at SMU Mustangs – Game summary

Quarter	1	2	3	4	Total
Red Raiders	6	0	14	7	27
Mustangs	3	0	3	7	13

at Gerald J. Ford Stadium, University Park, Texas

- Date: September 4
- Game time: 6:00 p.m.
- Game weather: Temperature: 88 °F (31 °C) • Weather: Humid • Wind: SE 10 MPH
- Game attendance: 34,689
- Referee: Rich Kollen
- Box score, Recap

Game information

First quarter

- SMU – Chris McMurtray 35-yard field goal, 5:57. Mustangs 3–0. Drive: 12 plays, 63 yards, 3:23.
- TTU – Bristol Olomua 14-yard pass from Sonny Cumbie (kick failed), 2:16. Red Raiders 6–3. Drive: 11 plays, 79 yards, 3:41.

Second quarter

- No scoring plays

Third quarter

- SMU – Chris McMurtray 26-yard field goal, 10:12. Tied 6–6. Drive: 11 plays, 68 yards, 4:48.
- TTU – Joel Filani 15-yard pass from Sonny Cumbie (Alex Trlica kick), 7:23. Red Raiders 13–6. Drive: 8 plays, 64 yards, 2:49.
- TTU – Bristol Olomua 13-yard pass from Sonny Cumbie (Alex Trlica kick), 0:29. Red Raiders 20–6. Drive: 7 plays, 78 yards, 1:51.

Fourth quarter

- TTU – Jarrett Hicks 19-yard pass from Sonny Cumbie (Alex Trlica kick), 7:25. Red Raiders 27–6. Drive: 13 plays, 90 yards, 4:03.
- SMU – Cedrick Dorsey 7-yard run (Chris McMurtray kick), 3:07. Red Raiders 27–13. Drive: 13 plays, 76 yards, 4:18.

Top passers

- TTU – Sonny Cumbie – 40/66, 470 yards, 4 TD
- SMU – Chris Phillips – 12/28, 109 yards, INT

Top rushers

- TTU – Taurean Henderson – 11 rushes, 54 yards
- SMU – Chris Phillips – 21 rushes, 75 yards

Top receivers

- TTU – Jarrett Hicks – 8 receptions, 150 yards, TD
- SMU – Blake Warren – 3 receptions, 42 yards

=== At New Mexico ===
Texas Tech Red Raiders at New Mexico Lobos – Game summary

Quarter	1	2	3	4	Total
Red Raiders	14	7	3	0	24
Lobos	7	14	0	6	27

at University Stadium, Albuquerque, New Mexico

- Date: September 11
- Game time: 6:00 p.m.
- Game weather: Temperature: 86 °F (30 °C) • Weather: Partly cloudy • Wind: SW 6 MPH
- Game attendance: 38,746
- Referee: Tom Ahlers
- Box score, Recap

Game information

First quarter

- UNM – Kole McKamey 12-yard run (Wes Zunker kick), 13:17. Lobos 7–0. Drive: 2 plays, 16 yards, 0:30.
- TTU – Sonny Cumbie 1-yard run (Alex Trlica kick), 7:51. Tied 7–7. Drive: 13 plays, 70 yards, 3:40.
- TTU – Taurean Henderson 3-yard run (Alex Trlica kick), 3:45. Red Raiders 14–7. Drive: 8 plays, 64 yards, 2:15.

Second quarter

- UNM – Hank Baskett 7-yard pass from Kole McKamey (Wes Zunker kick), 11:47. Tied 14–14. Drive: 8 plays, 68 yards, 2:03.
- UNM – Kole McKamey 6-yard run (Wes Zunker kick), 8:53. Lobos 21–14. Drive: 6 plays, 64 yards, 0:44.
- TTU – Jarrett Hicks 8-yard pass from Sonny Cumbie (Alex Trlica kick), 0:05. Tied 21–21. Drive: 7 plays, 70 yards, 1:44.

Third quarter

- TTU – Alex Trlica 21-yard field goal, 7:19. Red Raiders 24–21. Drive: 13 plays, 73 yards, 5:30.

Fourth quarter

- UNM – Wes Zunker 44-yard field goal, 14:55. Tied 24–24. Drive: 9 plays, 36 yards, 3:35.
- UNM – Wes Zunker 43-yard field goal, 0:00. Tied 27–24. Drive: 11 plays, 53 yards, 1:43.

Top passers

- TTU – Sonny Cumbie – 44/69, 449 yards, TD, 2 INT
- UNM – Kole McKamey – 12/24, 173 yards, TD

Top rushers

- TTU – Taurean Henderson – 12 rushes, 37 yards, TD
- UNM – DonTrell Moore – 20 rushes, 76 yards

Top receivers

- TTU – Jarrett Hicks – 9 receptions, 150 yards, TD
- UNM – Hank Baskett – 6 receptions, 99 yards, TD

=== TCU ===
TCU Horned Frogs at Texas Tech Red Raiders – Game summary

Quarter	1	2	3	4	Total
Horned Frogs	7	14	0	14	35
Red Raiders	0	21	28	21	70

at Jones SBC Stadium, Lubbock, Texas

- Date: September 18
- Game time: 11:30 a.m.
- Game weather: Temperature: 80 °F (27 °C) • Weather: Cloudy • Wind: S 16 MPH
- Game attendance: 51,271
- Referee: R. G. Detillier
- TV announcers (FSN): Joel Meyers, Dave Lapham, Jim Knox
- Box score, Recap

Game information

First quarter

- TCU – Robert Merrill 8-yard run (Peter Lococo kick), 0:46. Horned Frogs 7–0. Drive: 2 plays, 27 yards, 0:28.

Second quarter

- TCU – Reggie Harrell 9-yard pass from Tye Gunn (Peter Lococo kick), 12:34. Horned Frogs 14–0. Drive: 6 plays, 29 yards, 2:19.
- TCU – Lonta Hobbs 1-yard run (Peter Lococo kick), 8:06. Horned Frogs 21–0. Drive: 5 plays, 43 yards, 1:53.
- TTU – Taurean Henderson 4-yard run (Alex Trlica kick), 6:53. Horned Frogs 21–7. Drive: 3 plays, 57 yards, 1:13.
- TTU – Johnnie Mack 8-yard pass from Sonny Cumbie (Alex Trlica kick), 3:32. Horned Frogs 21–14. Drive: 3 plays, 18 yards, 1:19.
- TTU – Bristol Olomua 4-yard pass from Sonny Cumbie (Alex Trlica kick), 0:02. Tied 21–21. Drive: 10 plays, 65 yards, 2:28.

Third quarter

- TTU – Bristol Olomua 4-yard pass from Sonny Cumbie (Alex Trlica kick), 12:45. Red Raiders 28–21. Drive: 4 plays, 20 yards, 0:45.
- TTU – Taurean Henderson 6-yard run (Alex Trlica kick), 9:08. Red Raiders 35–21. Drive: 8 plays, 68 yards, 2:34.
- TTU – Keyunta Dawson 17-yard fumble return (Alex Trlica kick), 9:03. Red Raiders 42–21.
- TTU – Johnnie Mack 8-yard run (Alex Trlica kick), 2:09. Red Raiders 49–21. Drive: 7 plays, 96 yards, 1:47.

Fourth quarter

- TTU – Taurean Henderson 2-yard run (Alex Trlica kick), 13:08. Red Raiders 56–21. Drive: 3 plays, 61 yards, 0:44.
- TCU – Lonta Hobbs 61-yard run (Peter Lococo kick), 11:51. Red Raiders 56–28. Drive: 3 plays, 80 yards, 1:17.
- TCU – Quentily Harmon 22-yard pass from Brandon Hassell (Peter Lococo kick), 11:36. Red Raiders 56–35. Drive: 1 play, 22 yards, 0:06.
- TTU – Jarrett Hicks 34-yard pass from Sonny Cumbie (Alex Trlica kick), 8:45. Red Raiders 63–35. Drive: 8 plays, 80 yards, 2:51.
- TTU – Johhnie Mack 30-yard pass from Cody Hodges (Alex Trlica kick), 3:05. Red Raiders 70–35. Drive: 4 plays, 52 yards, 1:22.

Top passers

- TCU – Tye Gunn – 8/21, 86 yards, TD
- TTU – Sonny Cumbie – 30/50, 441 yards, 4 TD, 2 INT

Top rushers

- TCU – Lonta Hobbs – 19 rushes, 123 yards, 2 TD
- TTU – Taurean Henderson – 17 rushes, 68 yards, 3 TD

Top receivers

- TCU – Quentily Harmon – 5 receptions, 87 yards, TD
- TTU – Jarrett Hicks – 8 receptions, 211 yards, TD

The Horned Frogs jumped out to a 21–0 lead midway through the second quarter before the Red Raiders scored 56 unanswered points.

=== At Kansas ===
Texas Tech Red Raiders at Kansas Jayhawks – Game summary

Quarter	1	2	3	4	Total
Red Raiders	5	6	13	7	31
Jayhawls	14	16	0	0	30

at Memorial Stadium, Lawrence, Kansas

- Date: September 25
- Game time: 2:30 p.m.
- Game weather: Temperature: 84 °F (29 °C) • Weather: Fair • Wind: NE 8 MPH
- Game attendance: 37,422
- Referee: Hal Dowden
- TV announcers (FSN): Joel Meyers, Dave Lapham, Jim Knox
- Box score, Recap

Game information

First quarter

- TTU – John Randle tackled in end zone, 9:59. Red Raiders 2–0.
- KU – John Randle 36-yard pass from Adam Barmann (Scott Webb kick), 6:01. Jayhawks 7–2. Drive: 1 play, 36 yards, 0:11.
- KU – John Randle 1-yard run (Scott Webb kick), 2:48. Jayhawks 14–2. Drive: 7 plays, 40 yards, 2:49.
- TTU – Alex Trlica 34-yard field goal, 0:44. Jayhawks 14–5. Drive: 8 plays, 63 yards, 2:04.

Second quarter

- KU – Scott Webb 22-yard field goal, 9:45. Jayhawks 17–5. Drive: 7 plays, 16 yards, 1:52.
- KU – Brandon Rideau 26-yard pass from Charles Gordon (Scott Webb kick), 2:37. Jayhawks 24–5. Drive: 8 plays, 80 yards, 3:30.
- KU – Charles Gordon 20-yard pass from Adam Barmann (pass failed), 0:48. Jayhawks 30–5. Drive: 4 plays, 36 yards, 1:11.
- TTU – Trey Haverty 32-yard pass from Sonny Cumbie (pass failed), 0:15. Jayhawks 30–11. Drive: 3 plays, 80 yards, 0:33.

Third quarter

- TTU – Taurean Henderson 1-yard run (Alex Trlica kick), 11:24. Jayhawks 30–18. Drive: 2 plays, 6 yards, 0:45.
- TTU – Jarrett Hicks 27-yard pass from Sonny Cumbie (run failed), 0:44. Jayhawks 30–24. Drive: 5 plays, 54 yards, 0:41.

Fourth quarter

- TTU – Taurean Henderson 70-yard run (Alex Trlica kick), 2:37. Red Raiders 31–30. Drive: 3 plays, 74 yards, 1:03.

Top passers

- TTU – Sonny Cumbie – 28/52, 356 yards, 2 TD, 4 INT
- KU – Adam Barmann – 22/46, 224 yards, 2 TD, 3 INT

Top rushers

- TTU – Taurean Henderson – 17 rushes, 169 yards, 2 TD
- KU – Austine Nwabuisi – 5 rushes, 24 yards

Top receivers

- TTU – Trey Haverty – 8 receptions, 143 yards, TD
- KU – Brandon Rideau – 7 receptions, 69 yards, TD

Texas Tech got on the board first, with Kansas running back John Randle being tackled in his own end zone for a safety. The Jayhawks then scored 14 unanswered points, with a 36-yard pass from Adam Barmann to Randle and a 1-yard Randle run. Texas Tech would then respond with a 34-yard field goal from Alex Trlica with under a minute left in the first quarter. Kansas went on another scoring run in the second, scoring 16 unanswered points, including a pass from wide receiver Charles Gordon to Brandon Rideau. Gordon would then score on a receiving touchdown from Barmann, but the ensuing two-point pass would fail. The Red Raiders would score their first touchdown in the closing seconds of the first half, with a 32-yard pass from Sonny Cumbie to Trey Haverty. Texas Tech would attempt a two-point conversion, but the pass fell incomplete. The Red Raiders went into halftime trailing 11–30. The Jayhawks were shutout in the second half as the Red Raiders scored 20 unanswered points, with running back Taurean Henderson scoring the game-winning touchdown with 2:37 left.

Quarterback Sonny Cumbie had an uneven game, completing 28-of-52 passes (53.8%) for 356 yards with two touchdowns and four interceptions. Wide receiver Danny Amendola lost a fumble, bringing the Red Raiders' turnover total to five. The Jayhawks would capitalize on the turnovers, scoring 16 points off of turnovers. Kansas would commit three turnovers, all interceptions by quarterback Adam Barmann.

=== At Oklahoma ===
Texas Tech Red Raiders at No. 2 Oklahoma Sooners – Game summary

Quarter	1	2	3	4	Total
Red Raiders	0	3	3	7	13
No. 2 Sooners	7	7	7	7	28

at Gaylord Family Oklahoma Memorial Stadium, Norman, Oklahoma

- Date: October 2
- Game time: 11:30 a.m.
- Game weather: Temperature: 62 °F (17 °C) • Weather: Clear • Wind: E 5 MPH
- Game attendance: 84,580
- Referee: C. Castleberry
- TV announcers (FSN): Joel Meyers, Dave Lapham, Jim Knox
- Box score, Recap

Game information

First quarter

- OKLA – Adrian Peterson 1-yard run (Trey DiCarlo kick), 7:33. Sooners 7–0. Drive: 6 plays, 78 yards, 1:41.

Second quarter

- TTU – Alex Trlica 32-yard field goal, 12:57. Sooners 7–3. Drive: 16 plays, 84 yards, 7:20.
- OKLA – Travis Wilson 10-yard pass from Jason White (Trey DiCarlo kick), 8:23. Sooners 14–3. Drive: 11 plays, 73 yards, 4:19.

Third quarter

- TTU – Alex Trlica 20-yard field goal, 9:41. Sooners 14–6. Drive: 9 plays, 77 yards, 5:19.
- OKLA – J. D. Runnels – 13-yard pass from Jason White (Trey DiCarlo kick), 9:41. Sooners 21–6. Drive: 9 plays, 65 yards, 4:56.

Fourth quarter

- OKLA – Travis Wilson 9-yard pass from Jason White (Trey DiCarlo kick), 10:30. Sooners 28–6. Drive: 11 plays, 85 yards, 4:20.
- TTU – Johhnie Mack – 8-yard run (Alex Trlica kick), 4:50. Sooners 28–13. Drive: 10 plays, 80 yards, 3:20.

Top passers

- TTU – Sonny Cumbie – 36/55, 369 yards, 3 INT
- OKLA – Jason White – 15/24, 151 yards, 3 TD

Top rushers

- TTU – Taurean Henderson – 17 rushes, 65 yards
- OKLA – Adrian Peterson – 22 rushes, 146 yards, TD

Top receivers

- TTU – Trey Haverty – 5 receptions, 98 yards
- OKLA – Travis Wilson – 4 receptions, 68 yards, 2 TD

=== Nebraska ===
Nebraska Cornhuskers at Texas Tech Red Raiders – Game summary

Quarter	1	2	3	4	Total
Cornhuskers	0	3	7	0	10
Red Raiders	7	14	21	28	70

at Jones SBC Stadium, Lubbock, Texas

- Date: October 9
- Game time: 7:00 p.m.
- Game weather: Temperature: 55 °F (13 °C) • Weather: Partly cloudy • Wind: N 6 MPH
- Game attendance: 52,594
- Referee: John Laurie
- TV announcers (TBS): Ron Thulin, Charles Davis, Craig Sager
- Box score, Recap

Game information

First quarter

- TTU – Jarrett Hicks 22-yard pass from Sonny Cumbie (Alex Trlica kick), 6:23. Red Raiders 7–0. Drive: 11 plays, 74 yards, 4:11.

Second quarter

- TTU – Taurean Henderson 3-yard run (Alex Trlica kick), 10:35. Red Raiders 14–0. Drive: 7 plays, 86 yards, 2:23.
- NEB – David Dyches 46-yard field goal, 4:53. Red Raiders 14–3. Drive: 4 plays, -2 yards, 0:53.
- TTU – Jarrett Hicks 80-yard pass from Sonny Cumbie (Alex Trlica kick), 1:14. Red Raiders 21–3. Drive: 2 plays, 85 yards, 0:50.

Third quarter

- NEB – Mark LeFlore 74-yard pass from Joe Dailey (David Dyches kick), 14:07. Red Raiders 21–10. Drive: 3 plays, 80 yards, 0:53.
- TTU – Johnnie Mack 6-yard pass from Sonny Cumbie (Alex Trlica kick), 4:16. Red Raiders 28–10. Drive: 10 plays, 69 yards, 5:36.
- TTU – Bristol Olomua 3-yard pass from Sonny Cumbie (Alex Trlica kick), 2:24. Red Raiders 35–10. Drive: 4 plays, 41 yards, 1:23.
- TTU – Johnnie Mack 14-yard run (Alex Trlica kick), 2:03. Red Raiders 42–10. Drive: 1 play, 14 yards, 0:07.

Fourth quarter

- TTU – Taurean Henderson 1-yard run (Alex Trlica kick), 11:16. Red Raiders 49–10. Drive: 14 plays, 64 yards, 5:37.
- TTU – Nehemiah Glover 2-yard pass from Sonny Cumbie (Alex Trlica kick), 9:36. Red Raiders 56–10. Drive: 3 plays, 8 yards, 1:27.
- TTU – Johnie Mack 6-yard run (Alex Trlica kick), 9:05. Red Raiders 63–10. Drive: 2 plays, 6 yards, 0:13.
- TTU – Taurean Henderson 6-yard pass from Cody Hodges (Alex Trlica kick), 7:14. Red Raiders 70–10. Drive: 1 play, 12 yards, 0:20.

Top passers

- NEB – Joe Dailey – 14/34, 187 yards, TD, INT
- TTU – Sonny Cumbie – 44/56, 436 yards, 5 TD, INT

Top rushers

- NEB – Cory Ross – 15 rushes, 49 yards
- TTU – Taurean Henderson – 7 rushes, 38 yards, 2 TD

Top receivers

- NEB – Mark LeFlore – 5 receptions, 110 yards, TD
- TTU – Jarrett Hicks – 3 receptions, 107 yards, 2 TD

Texas Tech forced eight turnovers while only committing one and had 523 yards of total offense while Nebraska only had 292. The 70 points given up and the 60 point margin of defeat are both the largest in Nebraska school history. In 2020, the Omaha World-Herald ranked this game as the seventh most painful loss in the Cornhuskers' history since a 36–62 loss to Colorado in 2001.

=== Texas ===
No. 8 Texas Longhorns at Texas Tech Red Raiders – Game summary

Quarter	1	2	3	4	Total
No. 8 Longhorns	14	10	14	13	51
Red Raiders	7	7	0	7	21

at Jones SBC Stadium, Lubbock, Texas

- Date: October 23
- Game time: 6:00 p.m.
- Game weather: Temperature: 72 °F (22 °C) • Weather: Clear • Wind: SW 9 MPH
- Game attendance: 55,413
- Referee: Steve Usechek
- TV announcers (TBS): Ron Thulin, Charles Davis, Craig Sager
- Box score, Recap

Game information

First quarter

- TTU – Taurean Henderson 2-yard run (Alex Trlica kick), 7:25. Red Raiders 7–0. Drive: 5 plays, 86 yards, 1:53.
- TEX – Vince Young 2-yard run (Dusty Mangum kick), 2:49. Tied 7–7. Drive: 11 plays, 80 yards, 4:36.
- TEX – Vince Young 2-yard run (Dusty Mangum kick), 0:38. Longhorns 14–7. Drive: 5 plays, 25 yards, 1:42.

Second quarter

- TTU – Sonny Cumbie 1-yard run (Alex Trlica kick), 10:00. Tied 14–14. Drive: 12 plays, 71 yards, 5:26.
- TEX – David Thomas 9-yard pass from Vince Young (Dusty Mangum kick), 7:00. Longhorns 21–14. Drive: 6 plays, 80 yards, 3:00.
- TEX – Dusty Mangum 27-yard field goal, 0:06. Longhorns 24–14. Drive: 9 plays, 73 yards, 2:59.

Third quarter

- TEX – Vince Young 1-yard run (Dusty Mangum kick), 9:14. Longhorns 31–14. Drive: 13 plays, 80 yards, 5:46.
- TEX – Vince Young 11-yard run (Dusty Mangum kick), 8:14. Longhorns 38–14. Drive: 1 play, 11 yards, 0:05.

Fourth quarter

- TEX – Dusty Mangum 22-yard field goal, 14:07. Longhorns 41–14. Drive: 16 plays, 56 yards, 6:25.
- TEX – Cedric Benson 1-yard run (Dusty Mangum kick), 9:15. Longhorns 48–14. Drive: 8 plays, 36 yards, 3:37.
- TTU – Trey Haverty 11-yard pass from Sonny Cumbie (Alex Trlica kick), 7:23. Longhorns 48–21. Drive: 5 plays, 77 yards, 1:52.
- TEX – Richmond McGee 44-yard field goal, 2:40. Longhorns 51–21. Drive: 7 plays, 19 yards, 4:43.

Top passers

- TEX – Vince Young – 10/15, 142 yards, TD
- TTU – Sonny Cumbie – 34/51, 403 yards, TD, INT

Top rushers

- TEX – Cedric Benson – 38 rushes, 168 yards, TD
- TTU – Taurean Henderson – 6 carries, 5 yards, TD

Top receivers

- TEX – Tony Jeffrey – 2 receptions, 75 yards
- TTU – Nehemiah Glover – 11 receptions, 166 yards

=== At Kansas State ===
Texas Tech Red Raiders at Kansas State Wildcats – Game summary

Quarter	1	2	3	4	Total
Red Raiders	14	0	14	7	35
Wildcats	0	7	12	6	25

at KSU Stadium, Manhattan, Kansas

- Date: October 30
- Game time: 6:00 p.m.
- Game weather: Temperature: 66 °F (19 °C) • Weather: Clear • Wind: SW 11-15 MPH
- Game attendance: 48,338
- Referee: Randy Cristal
- TV announcers (FSN): Bill Land, Gary Reasons, John Rhadigan
- Box score, Recap

Game information

First quarter

- TTU – Jarrett Hicks 1-yard pass from Sonny Cumbie (Alex Trlica kick), 10:00. Red Raiders 7–0. Drive: 11 plays, 83 yards, 5:00.
- TTU – Trey Haverty 20-yard pass from Sonny Cumbie (Alex Trlica kick), 1:11. Red Raiders 14–0. Drive: 13 plays, 80 yards, 6:50.

Second quarter

- KSU – Darren Sproles 5-yard run (Joe Rheem kick), 5:45. Red Raiders 14–7. Drive: 11 plays, 67 yards, 6:32.

Third quarter

- KSU – Joe Rheem 28-yard field goal, 10:37. Red Raiders 14–10. Drive: 9 plays, 63 yards, 4:23.
- TTU – Taurean Henderson 1-yard run (Alex Trlica kick), 6:24. Red Raiders 21–10. Drive: 9 plays, 80 yards, 4:13.
- TTU – Danny Amendola 90-yard punt return (Alex Trlica kick), 4:31. Red Raiders 28–10.
- KSU – Texas Tech penalty in end zone, 3:36. Red Raiders 28–12.
- KSU – Darren Sproles 40-yard run (Joe Rheem kick), 2:59. Red Raiders 28–19. Drive: 2 plays, 58 yards, 0:37.

Fourth quarter

- TTU – Taurean Henderson 43-yard run (Alex Trlica kick), 5:22. Red Raiders 35–19. Drive: 1 play, 43 yards, 0:08.
- KSU – Dylan Meier 2-yard run (pass failed), 2:27. Red Raiders 35–25. Drive: 14 plays, 75 yards, 2:55.

Top passers

- TTU – Sonny Cumbie – 27/39, 326 yards, 2 TD
- KSU – Dylan Meier – 26/41, 248 yards, INT

Top rushers

- TTU – Taurean Henderson – 14 rushes, 93 yards, 2 TD
- KSU – Dylan Meier – 16 rushes, 84 yards, TD

Top receivers

- TTU – Trey Haverty – 8 receptions, 98 yards, TD
- KSU – Yamon Figurs – 3 receptions, 91 yards

=== Baylor ===
Baylor Bears at Texas Tech Red Raiders – Game summary

Quarter	1	2	3	4	Total
Bears	7	3	0	7	17
Red Raiders	7	7	14	14	42

at Jones SBC Stadium, Lubbock, Texas

- Date: November 6
- Game time: 1:00 p.m.
- Game weather: Temperature: 63 °F (17 °C) • Weather: Partly cloudy • Wind: W 9 MPH
- Game attendance: 53,121
- Referee: Jon Bible
- Box score, Recap

Game information

First quarter

- BAY – Trent Shelton 71-yard run (Kenny Webb kick), 13:34. Bears 7–0. Drive: 3 plays, 80 yards, 1:26.
- TTU – Taurean Henderson 2-yard run (Alex Trlica kick), 3:45. Tied 7–7. Drive: 8 plays, 80 yards, 2:10.

Second quarter

- BAY – Kenny Webb 30-yard field goal, 14:52. Bears 10–7. Drive: 11 plays, 67 yards, 4:02.
- TTU – Trey Haverty 3-yard pass from Sonny Cumbie (Alex Trlica kick), 0:00. Red Raiders 14–10. Drive: 8 plays, 75 yards, 1:22.

Third quarter

- TTU – Danny Amendola 16-yard pass from Sonny Cumbie (Alex Trlica kick), 9:46. Red Raiders 21–10. Drive: 14 plays, 80 yards, 5:14.
- TTU – Trey Haverty 57-yard pass from Sonny Cumbie (Alex Trlica kick), 0:26. Red Raiders 28–10. Drive: 9 plays, 81 yards, 5:10.

Fourth quarter

- TTU – Jarrett Hicks 11-yard pass from Sonny Cumbie (Alex Trlica kick), 13:26. Red Raiders 35–10. Drive: 3 plays, 38 yards, 0:38.
- TTU – Brian Bishop 11-yard pass from Sonny Cumbie (Alex Trlica kick), 4:45. Red Raiders 42–10. Drive: 9 plays, 92 yards, 4:29.
- BAY – Terrance Parks 5-yard run (Kenny Webb kick), 1:22. Red Raiders 42–17. Drive: 9 plays, 79 yards, 3:23.

Top passers

- BAY – Shawn Bell – 9/22, 83 yards
- TTU – Sonny Cumbie – 37/48, 397 yards, 5 TD, INT

Top rushers

- BAY – Trent Shelton – 1 rush, 71 yards, TD
- TTU – Taurean Henderson – 16 rushes, 111 yards, TD

Top receivers

- BAY – Marques Roberts – 2 receptions, 49 yards
- TTU – Trey Haverty – 11 receptions, 158 yards, 2 TD

=== At Texas A&M ===
Texas Tech Red Raiders at No. 22 Texas A&M Aggies – Game summary

Quarter	1	2	3	4	OT	Total
Red Raiders	0	7	0	18	0	25
No. 22 Aggies	6	0	6	13	7	32

at Kyle Field, College Station, Texas

- Date: November 13
- Game time: 2:30 p.m.
- Game weather: Temperature: 54 °F (12 °C) • Weather: Cloudy • Wind: NE 10 MPH
- Game attendance: 82,278
- Referee: Randy Christal
- TV announcers (ABC): Gary Gerould, Dan Reeves, Vince Welch
- Box score, Recap

Game information

First quarter

- TAMU – Todd Pegram 30-yard field goal, 9:40. Aggies 3–0. Drive: 12 plays, 70 yards, 5:20.
- TAMU – Todd Pegram 30-yard field goal, 3:11. Aggies 6–0. Drive: 9 plays, 57 yards, 4:09.

Second quarter

- TTU – Taurean Henderson 10-yard pass from Sonny Cumbie (Alex Trlica kick), 4:29. Red Raiders 7–6. Drive: 13 plays, 97 yards, 4:37.

Third quarter

- TAMU – Courtney Lewis 28-yard run (kick failed), 3:22. Aggies 12–7. Drive: 7 plays, 61 yards, 2:43.

Fourth quarter

- TTU – Taurean Henderson 1-yard run (Sony Cumbie pass to Jarrett Hicks), 12:31. Red Raiders 15–12. Drive: 6 plays, 48 yards, 2:59.
- TAMU – Kerry Franks 48-yard pass from Reggie McNeal (run failed), 11:42. Aggies 18–15. Drive: 3 plays, 89 yards, 0:49.
- TTU – Alex Trlica 33-yard field goal, 10:09. Tied 18–18. Drive: 5 plays, 26 yards, 1:33.
- TAMU – Keith Joseph 1-yard run (Todd Pegram kick), 5:38. Aggies 25–18. Drive: 10 plays, 80 yards, 4:31.
- TTU – Jarrett Hicks 9-yard pass from Sonny Cumbie (Alex Trlica kick), 0:10. Tied 25–25. Drive: 13 plays, 71 yards, 5:28.

Overtime

- TAMU – Courtney Lewis 25-yard run (Todd Pegram kick). Aggies 32–25. Drive: 1 play, 25 yards.

Top passers

- TTU – Sonny Cumbie – 31/50, 294 yards, 2 TD, 3 INT
- TAMU – Reggie McNeal – 16/26, 254 yards, TD

Top rushers

- TTU – Taurean Henderson – 17 rushes, 80 yards, TD
- TAMU – Courtney Lewis – 19 rushes, 115 yards, 2 TD

Top receivers

- TTU – Cody Fuller – 7 receptions, 124 yards
- TAMU – Terrence Murphy – 4 receptions, 75 yards

=== Oklahoma State ===
No. 23 Oklahoma State Cowboys at Texas Tech Red Raiders – Game summary

Quarter	1	2	3	4	Total
No. 23 Cowboys	3	3	9	0	15
Red Raiders	7	0	7	17	31

at Jones SBC Stadium, Lubbock, Texas

- Date: November 27
- Game time: 2:30 p.m.
- Game weather: Temperature: 53 °F (12 °C) • Weather: Mostly sunny • Wind: SE 10 MPH
- Game attendance: 51,717
- Referee: Tom Ahlers
- TV announcers (FSN): Joel Meyers, Dave Lapham, Jim Knox
- Box score, Recap

Game information

First quarter

- OKST – Jason Ricks 20-yard field goal, 9:46. Cowboys 3–0. Drive: 11 plays, 77 yards, 5:14.
- TTU – Trey Haverty 9-yard pass from Sonny Cumbie (Alex Trlica kick), 3:16. Red Raiders 7–3. Drive: 15 plays, 80 yards, 6:30.

Second quarter

- OKST – Jason Ricks 55-yard field goal, 12:00. Red Raiders 7–6. Drive: 12 plays, 30 yards, 6:16.

Third quarter

- OKST – Jason Ricks 24-yard field goal, 9:57. Cowboys 9–7. Drive: 8 plays, 49 yards, 3:07.
- TTU – Jarrett Hicks 2-yard pass from Sonny Cumbie (Alex Trlica kick), 8:36. Red Raiders 14–9. Drive: 5 plays, 80 yards, 1:21.
- OKST – Jamie Thompson 68-yard interception return (run failed), 3:06. Cowboys 15–14.

Fourth quarter

- TTU – Alex Trlica 22-yard field goal, 9:43. Red Raiders 17–15. Drive: 14 plays, 84 yards, 5:24.
- TTU – Jarrett Hicks 14-yard pass from Sonny Cumbie (Alex Trlica kick), 6:26. Red Raiders 24–15. Drive: 4 plays, 49 yards, 1:43.
- TTU – Taurean Henderson 6-yard run (Alex Trlica kick), 2:52. Red Raiders 31–15. Drive: 5 plays, 28 yards, 2:13.

Top passers

- OKST – Donovan Woods – 6/9, 60 yards
- TTU – Sonny Cumbie – 31/46, 281 yards, 3 TD, INT

Top rushers

- OKST – Vernand Morency – 23 rushes, 108 yards
- TTU – Taurean Henderson – 18 rushes, 85 yards, TD

Top receivers

- OKST – Charlie Johnson – 1 reception, 22 yards
- TTU – Jarrett Hicks – 5 receptions, 96 yards, 2 TD

=== Vs. California (Holiday Bowl) ===
No. 23 Texas Tech Red Raiders vs. No. 4 California Golden Bears (Holiday Bowl) – Game summary

Quarter	1	2	3	4	Total
No. 23 Red Raiders	7	17	14	7	45
No. 4 Golden Bears	14	0	3	14	31

at Qualcomm Stadium, San Diego, California

- Date: December 30
- Game time: 7:00 p.m.
- Game weather: Temperature: 59 °F (15 °C) • Weather: Partly cloudy • Wind: WNW 6 MPH
- Game attendance: 63,711
- Referee: Frank White
- TV announcers (ESPN): Sean McDonough, Craig James, Heather Cox
- Box score, Recap

Game information

First quarter

- TTU – Jarrett Hicks 9-yard pass from Sonny Cumbie (Alex Trlica kick), 9:44. Red Raiders 7–0. Drive: 9 plays, 59 yards, 3:11.
- CAL – J. J. Arrington 2-yard run (Tom Schneider kick), 3:35. Tied 7–7. Drive: 5 plays, 58 yards, 2:03.
- CAL – Marshawn Lynch 5-yard run (Tom Schneider kick), 0:29. Golden Bears 14–7. Drive: 4 plays, 65 yards, 1:29.

Second quarter

- TTU – Alex Trlica 21-yard field goal, 11:51. Golden Bears 14–10. Drive: 12 plays, 79 yards, 3:38.
- TTU – Jarrett Hicks 5-yard pass from Sonny Cumbie (Alex Trlica kick), 8:57. Red Raiders 17–14. Drive: 3 plays, 22 yards, 1:11.
- TTU – Taurean Henderson 2-yard run (Alex Trlica kick), 2:53. Red Raiders 24–14. Drive: 6 plays, 81 yards, 1:21.

Third quarter

- TTU – Joel Filani 60-yard pass from Sonny Cumbie (Alex Trlica kick), 13:01. Red Raiders 31–14. Drive: 4 plays, 85 yards, 1:59.
- CAL – Tom Schneider 29-yard field goal, 7:48. Red Raiders 31–17. Drive: 12 plays, 67 yards, 5:13.
- TTU – Johnnie Mack 11-yard run (Alex Trlica kick), 6:18. Red Raiders 38–17. Drive: 8 plays, 69 yards, 1:30.

Fourth quarter

- CAL – Garrett Cross 11-yard pass from Aaron Rodgers (Alex Trlica kick), 14:06. Red Raiders 38–24. Drive: 10 plays, 65 yards, 3:51.
- TTU – Taurean Henderson 1-yard run (Alex Trlica kick), 2:32. Red Raiders 45–24. Drive: 12 plays, 74 yards, 6:02.
- CAL – Aaron Rodgers 1-yard run (Tom Schneider kick), 0:43. Red Raiders 45–31. Drive 11 plays, 77 yards, 1:49.

Top passers

- TTU – Sonny Cumbie – 39/60, 520 yards, 3 TD
- CAL – Aaron Rodgers – 24/42, 246 yards, TD, INT

Top rushers

- TTU – Taurean Henderson – 10 rushes, 35 yards, 2 TD
- CAL – J. J. Arrington – 25 rushes, 173 yards, TD

Top receivers

- TTU – Trey Haverty – 8 receptions, 147 yards
- CAL – Jonathan Makonnen – 8 receptions, 99 yards

== Personnel ==
2004 Texas Tech Red Raiders football team roster
Players
Coaches
Offense

Pos.	#	Name	Class
OL	72	Josh Aleman	Fr
WR	20	Danny Amendola	So
WR	84	Cullin Bacak	Fr
OL	66	Cody Baker	Fr
OL	76	David Chatterton	Fr
OL	68	Daniel Christian	Sr
QB	15	Sonny Cumbie	Sr
QB	16	Phillip Daugherty	So
WR	11	Brandon Douglas	Jr
QB	6	Graham Harrell	Fr
WR	7	Trey Haverty	Sr
RB	19	Taurean Henderson	Sr
WR	88	Jarrett Hicks	So
WR	8	Joel Filani	Jr
WR	24	Cody Fuller	Sr
OL	65	Dylan Gandy	Sr
OL	70	Ben Griffin	So
OL	78	Gabe Hall	Jr
RB	41	Kelly Hildebrandt	So
QB	10	Cody Hodges	Sr
WR	83	Slade Hodges	Sr
OL	69	Glenn January	Jr
WR	18	Anthony Jenkins	Fr
WR	27	Marquis Johnson	Jr
WR	9	Robert Johnson	Jr
OL	73	Brandon Jones	Jr
OL	62	Bryan Kegans	Sr
OL	60	Daniel Loper	Sr
RB	4	Johnnie Mack	Sr
FB	38	Tywon Mackey	So
RB	32	Caeser Martinez	Sr
WR	26	Eric Morris	Fr
OL	74	Josh Morris	So
TE	35	Bristol Olomua	Sr
WR	22	Adam Parsons	Fr
OL	63	Manuel Ramirez	Jr
RB	40	Taurance Rawls	So
WR	86	L. A. Reed	Fr
TE	80	Rylan Reed	Fr
WR	89	Chris Richburg	Fr
QB	2	Ryan Rowland	So
WR	29	David Schaefer	So
WR	3	Todd Walker	Fr
WR	25	Rickey Wegner	Jr
WR	23	Travis Wheat	So
OL	75	E. J. Whitley	Sr
OL	89	Jared Williams	Fr
WR	85	Josh Witherspoon	Fr
RB	39	Shannon Woods	Fr

Defense

Pos.	#	Name	Class
S	3	Martin Aguirre	So
DB	31	Greg Aycock	Jr
DE	51	Dek Bake	Sr
DE	43	Brett Bischofberger	Sr
LB	41	Sylvester Brinkley	Sr
S	9	Chris Brister	Jr
CB	37	Marcus Benton	Fr
DL	84	Randall Cherry	Sr
S	11	Hunter Coleman	So
S	13	James Conwright	So
S	24	Dustin Culpepper	Sr
DE	96	Keyunta Dawson	Jr
CB	21	Clifton Eddington	Jr
CB	18	Phil Ervin	So
DB	19	Lance Fuller	Fr
FS	49	Joe Garcia	So
DL	87	Charles Glover	Sr
LB	54	Chad Hill	So
S	10	Anthony Hines	Fr
DL	93	Chris Hudler	Jr
CB	36	Antonio Huffman	Jr
DT	72	Brian Jones	Fr
CB	25	Sirdon Lewis	Sr
LB	68	Ty Linder	So
CB	20	Darcel McBath	Fr
LB	23	Jamequinlon McGill	Jr
FS	1	Vincent Meeks	Sr
DB	26	Khalid Naziruddin	Sr
DE	40	Rome Nichols	Jr
DE	92	Seth Nitschmann	Jr
CB	17	Chris Parker	So
DE	95	Jake Ratliff	Fr
LB	5	John Saldi	Sr
DL	99	Ken Scott	Jr
LB	53	Calen Shearer	Fr
LB	39	Brent Slaughter	Jr
S	3	Dwayne Slay	Sr
LB	51	Mike Smith	Sr
LB	45	Brock Stratton	Jr
DL	97	Fred Thwreatt	Sr
LB	56	Kellen Tillman	Jr
DE	52	Shane Wagner	So
S	16	Loy White	So
LB	48	Paul Williams	Jr
DE	89	Tyler Yenzer	So

Special teams

Pos.	#	Name	Class
DS	61	Michael Bettenhausen	So
P	22	Alex Reyes	Jr
DS	58	Ian Smetona	Sr
K	14	Keith Toogood	Jr
K	30	Alex Trlica	So

Head coach

- Mike Leach

Coordinators/assistant coaches

Legend

- (C) Team captain
- (S) Suspended
- (I) Ineligible
- Injured
- Redshirt

Roster

== Players drafted into the NFL ==
Round	Pick	Player	Position	NFL club
4	129	Dylan Gandy	G	Indianapolis Colts
5	150	Daniel Loper	T	Tennessee Titans
7	234	Mike Smith	LB	Baltimore Ravens
