= Chijioke =

Chijioke is a male given name of Igbo origin. It means "chi holds my share".

Notable people with the given name include:

- Chijioke Amu-Nnadi (born 1962), Nigerian poet and author
- Chijioke Ejiogu (born 1984), Nigerian soccer player
- Chijioke Nwakodo, Nigerian politician and businessman
- Chijioke Onyenegecha (born 1983), Canadian football player
- Chijioke Ugwueze (died 2020), Nigerian politician
