= Danny Amendola =

American football player (born 1985)

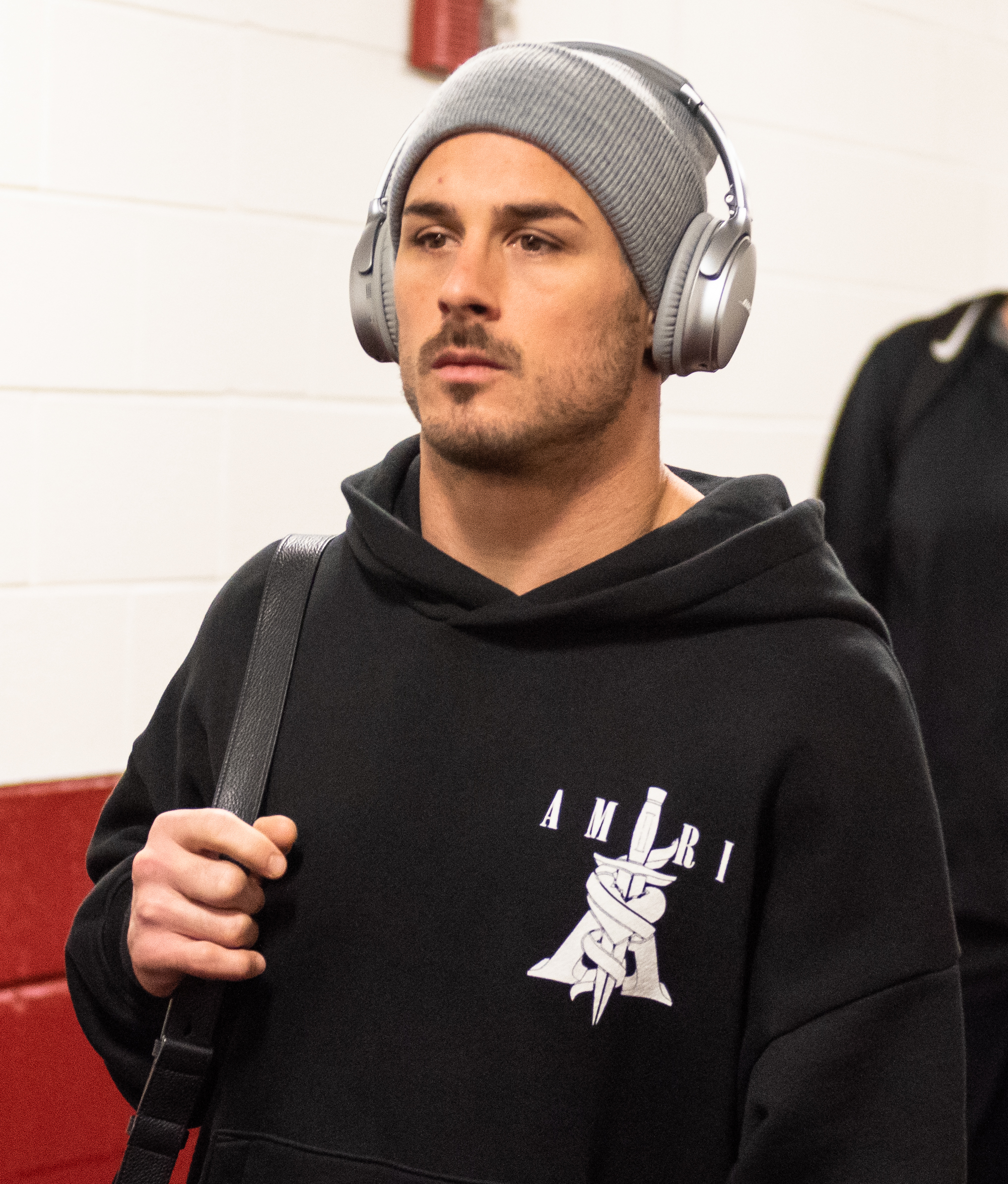
- Amendola in 2019

No. 16, 80, 89
- Position: Wide receiver

Personal information
- Born: November 2, 1985 (age 41); The Woodlands, Texas, U.S.
- Listed height: 5 ft 11 in (1.80 m)
- Listed weight: 185 lb (84 kg)

Career information
- High school: The Woodlands
- College: Texas Tech (2004–2007)
- NFL draft: 2008: undrafted

Career history

Playing
- Dallas Cowboys (2008)*; Philadelphia Eagles (2008–2009)*; St. Louis Rams (2009–2012); New England Patriots (2013–2017); Miami Dolphins (2018); Detroit Lions (2019–2020); Houston Texans (2021)
- * Offseason or practice squad member only

Coaching
- Las Vegas Raiders (2023) Coaching assistant/returners

Awards and highlights
- 2× Super Bowl champion (XLIX, LI); NFL kick return yards leader (2009); New England Patriots All-2010s Team; First-team All-Big 12 (2004); Second-team All-Big 12 (2007)

Career NFL statistics
- Receptions: 617
- Receiving yards: 6,212
- Receiving touchdowns: 24
- Return yards: 5,450
- Passing yards: 83
- Passing touchdowns: 2
- Stats at Pro Football Reference

Daniel James Amendola (/ˌæmənˈdoʊlə/ ah-mən-DOH-lə; born November 2, 1985) is an American former professional football player who was a wide receiver in the National Football League (NFL). He played college football for the Texas Tech Red Raiders and was signed by the Dallas Cowboys as an undrafted free agent in 2008.

After spending his entire rookie season on the Cowboys' practice squad, Amendola then spent part of the 2009 season on the practice squad of the Philadelphia Eagles before being signed by the St. Louis Rams. With the Rams, he began his career as an active player over four seasons. Amendola then spent the next five seasons with the New England Patriots where he appeared in three Super Bowls, winning two. He then had stints with the Miami Dolphins, Detroit Lions, and Houston Texans over the final four seasons of his career. In 2023, Amendola began a coaching position as an assistant/returners coach for the Las Vegas Raiders.

== Early life ==
Amendola attended The Woodlands High School in The Woodlands, Texas, playing football under coach Weldon Willig. He completed his high school career by leading his team to its first-ever Texas state championship game, where they lost to North Shore High School. Amendola finished his senior season with 1,045 receiving yards, 129 rushing yards, and eight touchdowns.

== College career ==
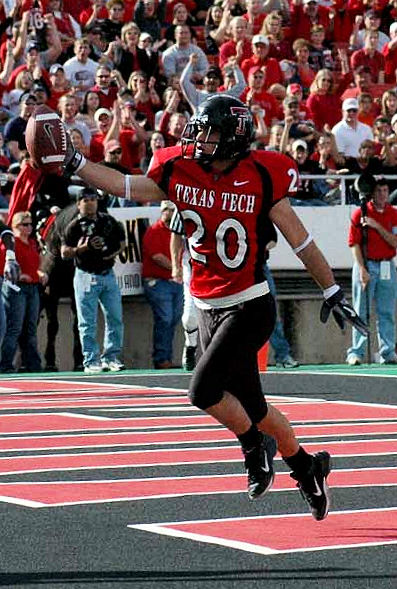
Amendola as a freshman at Texas Tech

Amendola finished his college career at Texas Tech with 204 receptions for 2,246 yards and 15 touchdowns. He also returned 116 punts for 1,283 yards and a touchdown, giving him an average of 11.06 yards per return, which ranks Amendola third all-time in school history in punt returns and yardage, behind only Wes Welker and Tyrone Thurman. Amendola's best year was his senior year, when he recorded 109 catches for 1,245 yards and six touchdowns.

As a freshman in 2004, Amendola saw limited duty on offense but was Tech's leading punt returner. He was named to the All-Big 12 first-team as punt return specialist. Amendola also caught 13 passes during the season, including a touchdown pass during the 2004 game against the Baylor Bears.

During the 2005 season, Amendola made two memorable plays that led to Red Raider victories. The first was late in the 2005 game against the Oklahoma Sooners. Tech was trailing and on fourth down, a Cody Hodges pass attempt was tipped, and Amendola made a leaping catch in traffic. He was tackled immediately and appeared to have been stopped just short of a first down. However, the spot was reviewed by the replay officials and the final spot of the ball resulted in a first down. The drive was kept alive and resulted in yet another disputed call—Taurean Henderson's stretch over the goal line on the final play of regulation, which gave the Red Raiders the victory over the Sooners.

Another game-changing play came when Amendola recovered the fumble from an intercepted pass during the final drive of the 2005 game against the Nebraska Cornhuskers. Tech needed a touchdown to win. Tech quarterback Cody Hodges's pass was tipped and intercepted. Instead of taking a knee to seal the victory, the Nebraska defender decided to run with the ball and had it stripped. Amendola dove for the loose ball and recovered it. Tech retained possession, resulting in a game-winning touchdown pass from Hodges to Joel Filani on fourth down with under 30 seconds remaining.

As a junior in 2006, Amendola had 48 receptions for 487 yards and five touchdowns.

As a senior in 2007, Amendola had 109 receptions for 1,245 yards and six touchdowns.

Amendola majored in Communication Studies while at Texas Tech, but left early to train for the NFL Combine.

== Professional career ==
=== Pre-draft ===
Pre-draft measurables
Height	Weight	Arm length	Hand span	40-yard dash	10-yard split	20-yard split	20-yard shuttle	Three-cone drill	Vertical jump	Broad jump	Bench press
5 ft 10 1/2 in (1.79 m)	183 lb (83 kg)	29 in (0.74 m)	8 1/4 in (0.21 m)	4.58 s	1.56 s	2.67 s	4.25 s	6.81 s	31.5 in (0.80 m)	8 ft 7 in (2.62 m)	13 reps
All values from the 2008 NFL Combine (except the 40-yd dash and vertical jump)

Amendola drew numerous comparisons to former Texas Tech receiver Wes Welker, whose NFL career included stints with the Miami Dolphins, the New England Patriots, and the Denver Broncos, as the two have similar builds (Welker is 5'9", 185 lb, while Amendola is 5'11", 183 lb), and played the same positions at Texas Tech (slot receiver and punt returner).

=== Dallas Cowboys ===
Amendola signed as an undrafted free agent with the Dallas Cowboys on April 27, 2008. His attempt to make it to the NFL was featured on the HBO special Hard Knocks. Amendola was cut by the Cowboys on August 30 and re-signed to the practice squad after clearing waivers. He spent the entire 2008 regular season on the team's practice squad, and never saw regular season action.

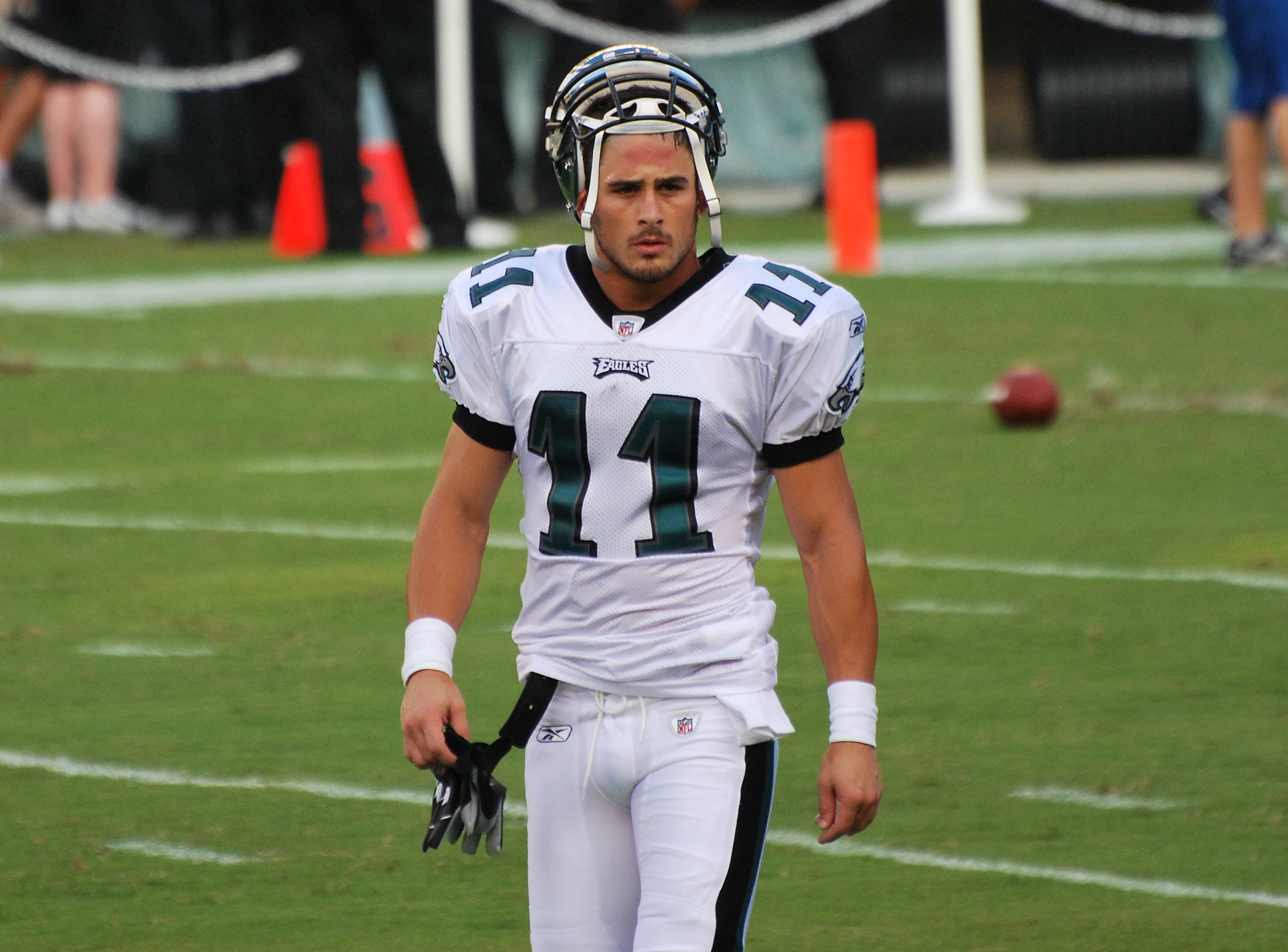
Amendola in August 2009

=== Philadelphia Eagles ===
After his contract expired with the Cowboys, Amendola was signed to the Philadelphia Eagles practice squad on January 6, 2009. Following the season, Amendola was re-signed to a future contract on January 19, 2009. He was waived during final cuts on September 5, 2009. He was re-signed to their practice squad on September 6, 2009, but never played a down in the regular season.

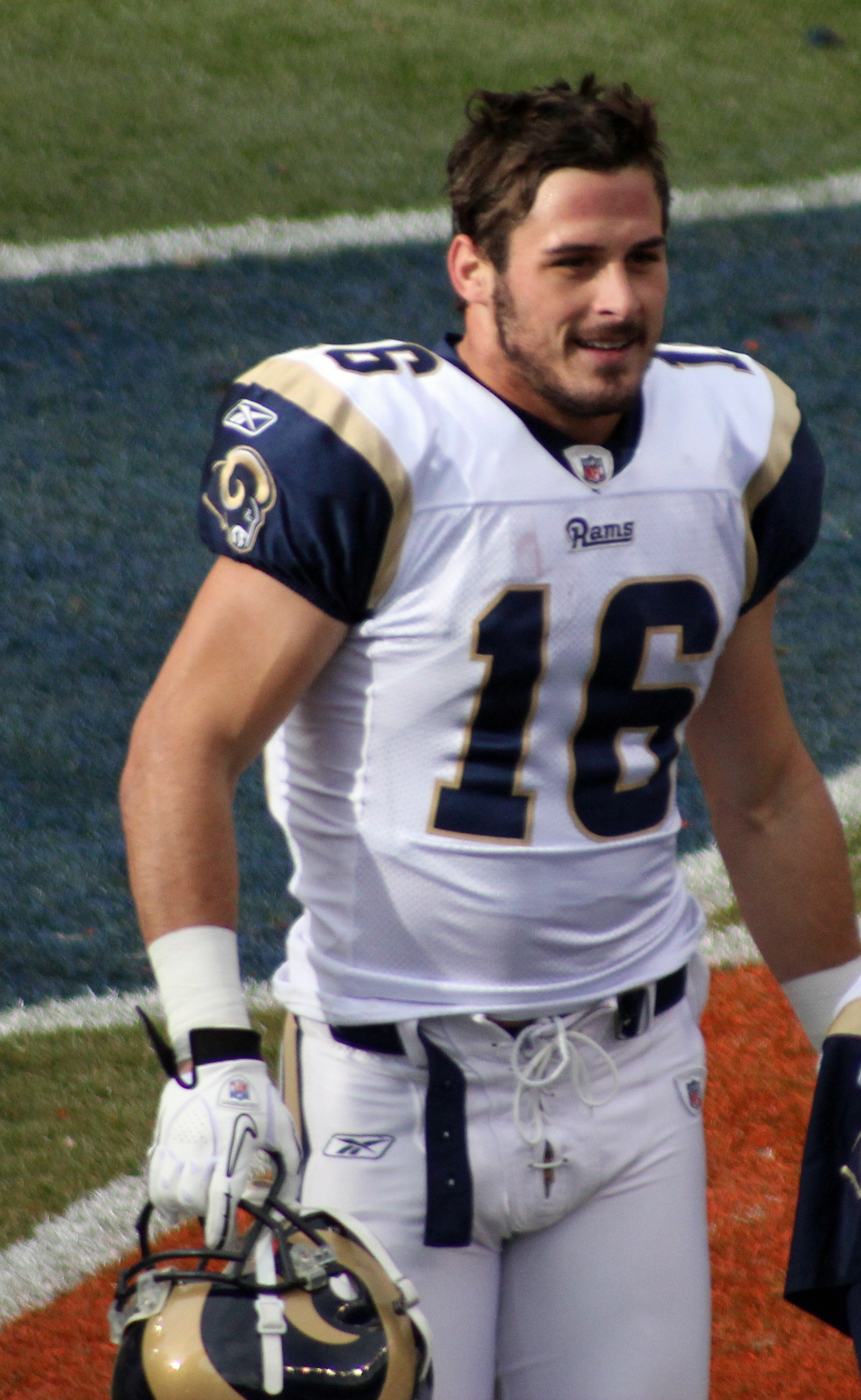
Amendola in November 2010

=== St. Louis Rams ===
Amendola was signed off the Eagles' practice squad by the St. Louis Rams on September 22, 2009. The Rams signed Amendola after hiring former Philadelphia Eagles' quarterbacks coach Pat Shurmur to be their offensive coordinator. In his first NFL regular season action in 2009, he caught 43 passes for 326 yards and one touchdown as a slot receiver. He also returned 66 kickoffs for 1,618 yards and 31 punts for 360 yards. He started in six games in 2010, an increase from his two starts in 2009. In 2010, Amendola led the NFL in all-purpose yards with 2,364, including 689 yards on 85 receptions, 81 yards on 7 rushing attempts, 1,142 yards on 50 kickoff returns, and 452 yards on 40 punt returns.

In 2011, Amendola sustained an upper-arm injury in the first game of the season that resulted in him missing the remaining 15 games of the season after he underwent season-ending triceps surgery to repair the damage.

On September 16, 2012, Amendola had 12 catches in the first half in a Week 2 game against the Washington Redskins that tied the record for most catches in a half set by Reggie Wayne in 2007. He finished the game with career-highs with 15 receptions for 160 yards to go along with a receiving touchdown.

On October 4, 2012, Amendola suffered a dislocated clavicle in the second quarter of the game versus the Arizona Cardinals. In a rare case, instead of popping out, the clavicle popped in and came millimeters from puncturing his trachea and aorta, which could have killed him. Rams' medical staff called around the league for information, but no teams reported ever having a player suffer a similar injury. Amendola was anesthetized before popping the clavicle back into place. Due to the unusual nature of the injury the Rams were not certain when Amendola would return, but he was able to recover after just three weeks and recorded 11 catches for 102 yards in a hard-fought tie with the San Francisco 49ers. He finished the season with 804 total yards, including 666 yards on 63 receptions and 122 yards on 17 punt returns.

Amendola joined Mark Chapman and Mike Carlson for the BBC's coverage of Super Bowl XLVI on February 5, 2012.

=== New England Patriots ===
On March 13, 2013, just hours after New England Patriots slot receiver Wes Welker signed with the Denver Broncos, the Patriots announced the signing of Amendola. Amendola received a five-year contract for $28.5 million, with $10 million of that money guaranteed. According to Patriots Insider Tom E. Curran of CSN New England, Amendola actually signed with the Patriots before Welker signed with the Broncos.

==== 2013 season ====
In the aftermath of the Boston Marathon bombing, Amendola pledged on his Twitter feed to donate to a recovery fund $100 for every pass he caught during the 2013 season, and $200 for every pass he dropped. Patriots defensive back Devin McCourty, citing Amendola, made a similar pledge ($100 per tackle, and $200 per interception).

In his Week 1 debut with New England, Amendola suffered a groin injury in the first half against the Buffalo Bills. He then returned after halftime to finish the game with 10 catches for 104 yards. Three of his catches were on crucial 3rd downs including two on the game-winning drive.

Amendola became the 50th receiver all time to catch a touchdown pass from Tom Brady when he caught a touchdown in the first quarter of a game against the Pittsburgh Steelers on November 3, 2013.

Despite high expectations for the 2013 season, Amendola finished the year with 54 catches for 633 yards and two touchdowns, second to Julian Edelman. He had three games going over the 100-yard mark on the year.

==== 2014 season ====
In the 2014 season, Amendola only caught 27 passes for 200 yards and one touchdown. However, he had a solid game against the Baltimore Ravens in the Divisional Round of that year's playoffs, catching five passes for 81 yards and two touchdowns, including a 51-yard score thrown by fellow wide receiver Julian Edelman on a screen pass. The Patriots would defeat the Ravens by a score of 35–31. In the AFC Championship game, Amendola recorded an eight-yard reception in a 45–7 victory over the Indianapolis Colts. During Super Bowl XLIX, Amendola recorded five catches for 48 yards and a touchdown in a 28–24 victory against the Seattle Seahawks.

==== 2015 season ====
On September 27, 2015, in a Week 3 game against the Jacksonville Jaguars, Amendola caught Tom Brady's 400th career touchdown pass.

On November 15, 2015, Amendola returned a kick 82 yards, and would have had a touchdown if he hadn't been tripped by his own teammate, Duron Harmon, on the 6-yard line. The next week, in a 20–13 win over the Buffalo Bills, Amendola racked up nine catches for 117 yards before leaving with a knee injury. The injury was later reported to be a sprain, putting Amendola's availability on a week-to-week basis. He returned on December 6 in a 35–28 loss to the Philadelphia Eagles, catching seven passes for 62 yards and a touchdown and completing a pass to quarterback Tom Brady for 36 yards. On January 22, 2016, Amendola was fined $23,152 by the NFL for an illegal block on Kansas City Chiefs punt returner Jamell Fleming during the AFC Divisional Round.

==== 2016 season ====
In Week 2, Amendola caught four passes for 48 yards and two touchdowns from Jimmy Garoppolo in a 31–24 win over the Miami Dolphins. In Week 13 against his former team, the St. Louis Rams, he suffered a high ankle sprain that sidelined him for the rest of the regular season, but he returned for the playoffs. The Patriots reached Super Bowl LI, where Amendola had eight catches for 78 yards in the Patriots' historic 34–28 overtime comeback victory over the Atlanta Falcons. Amendola scored the Patriots' first touchdown of the fourth quarter to narrow what had been a 25-point Falcons lead down to 28–18 and a two-point conversion with less than a minute to go to tie the game at 28–28. He became the first wide receiver in NFL history to have a touchdown and a two-point conversion in the same Super Bowl. His Super Bowl LI touchdown was his second Super Bowl receiving touchdown. He became the 27th player in NFL history to have at least two career receiving touchdowns in the Super Bowl. Amendola finished the season with 23 receptions on 29 targets for 243 yards and four touchdowns in 2016. His 79.3% catch rate was the best of his career.

==== 2017 season ====
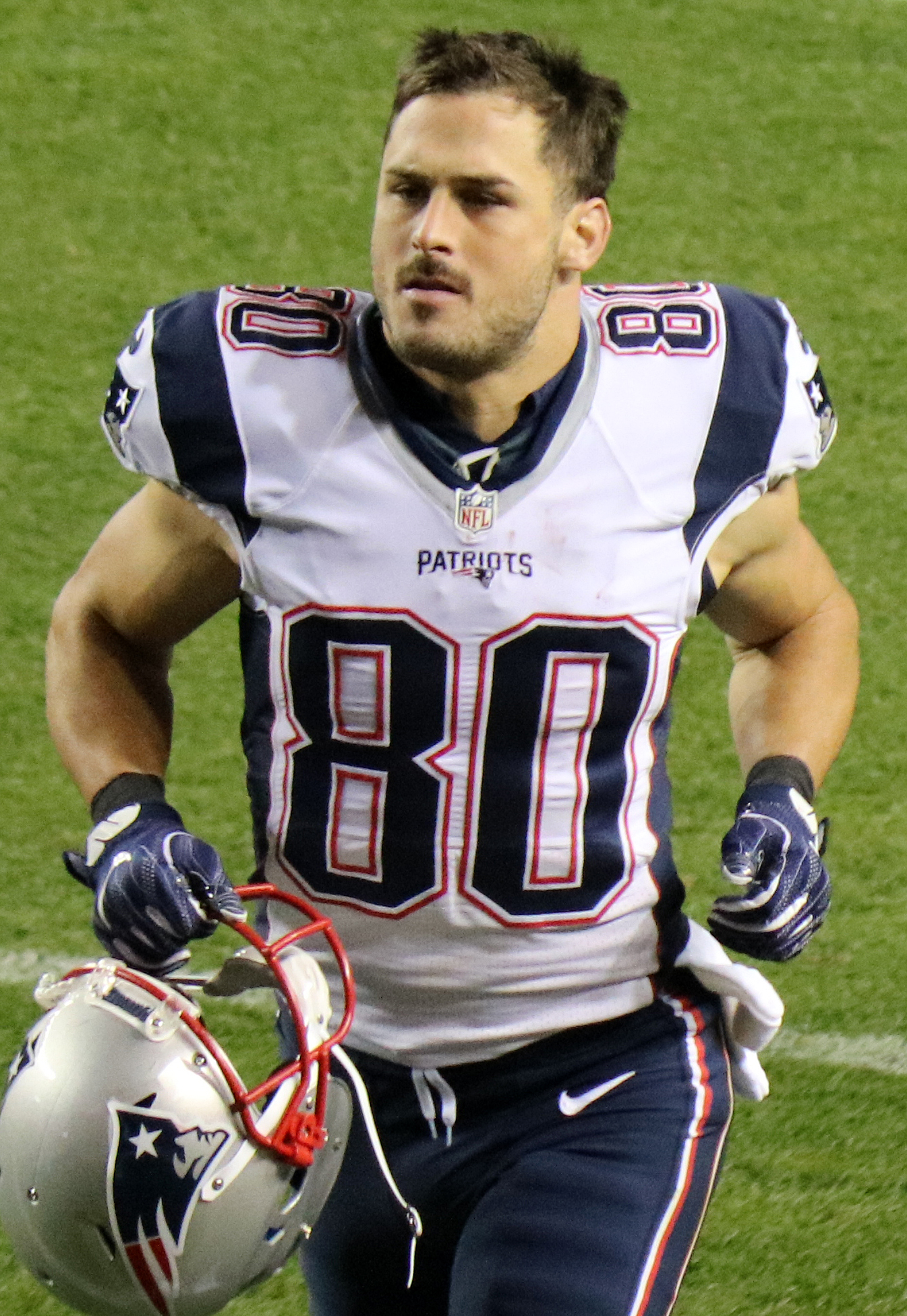
Amendola in a game against the Denver Broncos

Amendola started the 2017 season with a solid performance in a 42–27 loss to the Kansas City Chiefs on Thursday Night Football. He had six receptions for 100 yards before exiting the game with a head injury. He finished the 2017 season with 61 receptions for 659 yards and two touchdowns.

During the 2017 postseason, Amendola was given the nickname "Danny Playoff" by teammate Rob Gronkowski, due to his strong postseason performances. Some also refer to Amendola as simply "Playoff 'Dola." He was named MVP of the AFC Championship Game against the Jacksonville Jaguars on January 21, 2018. He had seven receptions for 84 yards, including two touchdowns in the fourth quarter, and a key 20-yard punt return to set up New England's winning touchdown as the Patriots rallied from being down 20–10 to win 24–20 and earn a trip to Super Bowl LII. During the Super Bowl, Amendola finished with eight receptions for 152 yards but the Patriots lost 41–33 to the Philadelphia Eagles.

=== Miami Dolphins ===
On March 15, 2018, Amendola signed a two-year contract with the Miami Dolphins. In Week 8 of the 2018 season, against the Houston Texans, he threw a touchdown pass to Kenyan Drake in the 42–23 loss. In the 2018 season, Amendola recorded 59 receptions for 575 yards and a touchdown.

On March 8, 2019, Amendola was released by the Dolphins.

=== Detroit Lions ===
==== 2019 season ====
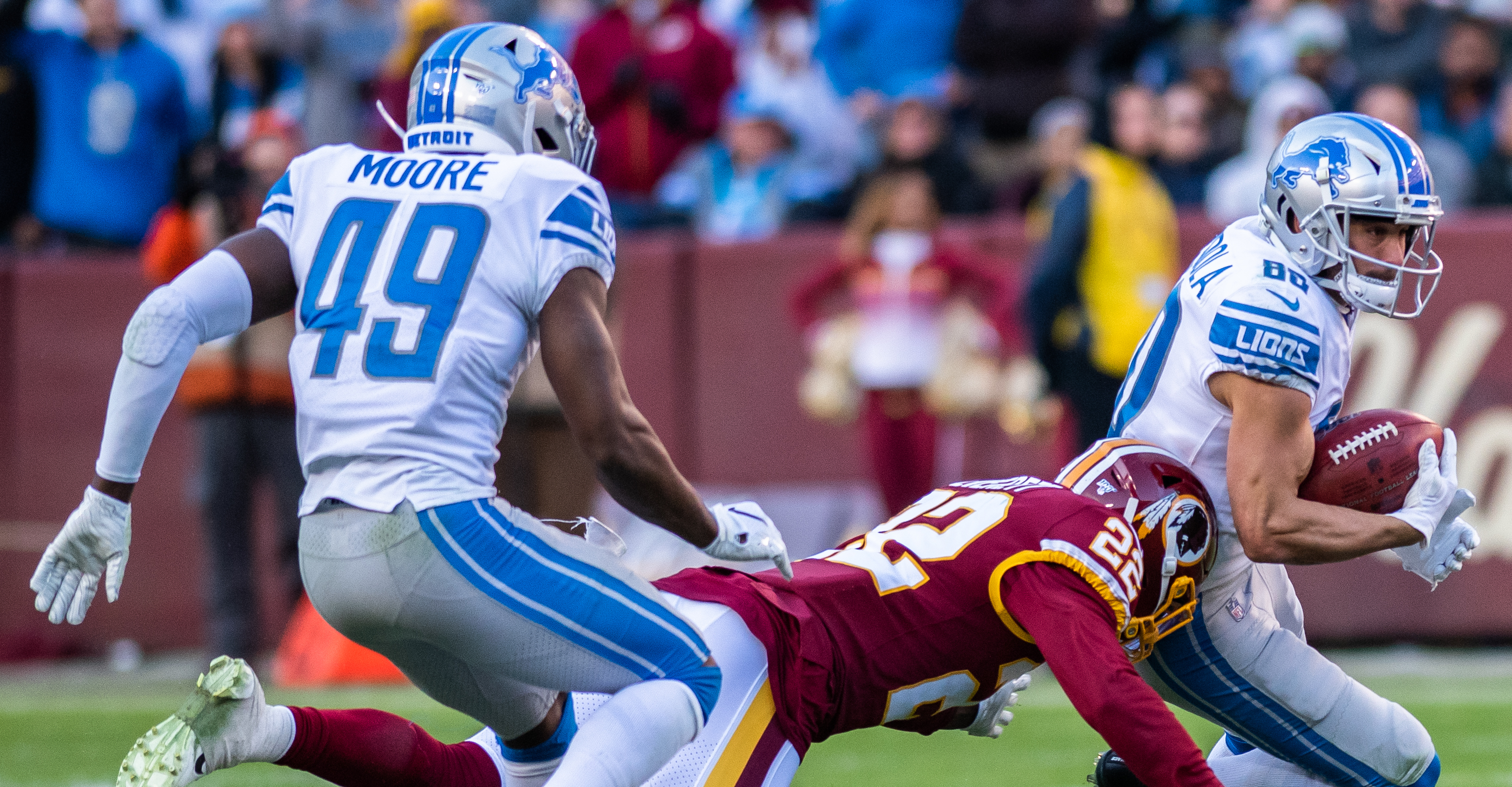
Amendola (far right) in a game against the Washington Redskins

On March 11, 2019, Amendola signed a one-year, $4.5 million contract with the Detroit Lions. The contract also includes up to $1.25 million in incentives. Amendola had previously played under Lions head coach Matt Patricia when the coach was the Patriots' defensive coordinator. Amendola made his debut with the Lions in Week 1 against the Arizona Cardinals. In the game, Amendola caught seven passes for 104 yards and a touchdown in a 27–27 tie. In Week 7 against the Minnesota Vikings, Amendola caught eight passes for 105 yards in the 42–30 loss. In Week 15 against the Tampa Bay Buccaneers, Amendola caught eight passes for 102 yards in the 38–17 loss. In week 17 Amendola caught two passes for 16 yards and threw a 19-yard touchdown pass to rookie quarterback David Blough during the 23–20 loss to the Green Bay Packers. During the 2019 season, Amendola posted 62 receptions for 678 receiving yards and one receiving touchdown.

==== 2020 season ====
On February 22, 2020, Amendola re-signed with the Lions on a one-year deal worth $4.5 million. In the 2020 season, Amendola had 46 receptions for 602 yards in 14 games.

=== Houston Texans ===
On September 7, 2021, Amendola signed a one-year contract with the Texans worth $2.5 million. He was placed on injured reserve on December 4, 2021. He was activated on December 25. In the 2021 season, Amendola recorded 24 receptions for 248 receiving yards and three receiving touchdowns in eight games.

=== Retirement ===
On July 25, 2022, Amendola announced his retirement from professional football.

== Career statistics ==
=== NFL ===
Legend
	Won the Super Bowl
	Led the league
**Bold**	Career high

==== Regular season ====
Year	Team	Games		Receiving							Rushing					Kickoff return					Punt return					Fumbles	
Year	Team	GP	GS	Tgt	Rec	Yds	Avg	Lng	TD	FD	Att	Yds	Avg	Lng	TD	Ret	Yds	Avg	Lng	TD	Ret	Yds	Avg	Lng	TD	Fum	Lost
2009	STL	14	2	63	43	326	7.6	25	1	19	3	−2	−0.7	8	0	**66**	**1,618**	24.5	58	0	31	360	11.6	56	0	**4**	1
2010	STL	**16**	6	**123**	**85**	**689**	8.1	36	3	35	**7**	**81**	**11.6**	**30**	0	50	1,142	22.8	**84**	0	**40**	**452**	11.3	42	0	2	1
2011	STL	1	1	6	5	45	9.0	18	0	3	—	—	—	—	—	—	—	—	—	—	1	0	0.0	0	0	1	0
2012	STL	11	8	101	63	666	10.6	56	3	39	2	8	4.0	6	0	2	16	8.0	12	0	17	122	7.2	22	0	3	**2**
2013	NE	12	6	83	54	633	11.7	**57**	2	37	1	1	1.0	1	0	—	—	—	—	—	1	13	**13.0**	13	0	0	0
2014	NE	**16**	4	42	27	200	7.4	21	1	12	—	—	—	—	—	20	482	24.1	81	0	16	132	8.3	39	0	0	0
2015	NE	14	7	87	65	648	10.0	41	3	32	2	11	5.5	8	0	8	172	21.5	29	0	23	276	12.0	**82**	0	1	1
2016	NE	12	4	29	23	243	10.6	32	**4**	14	—	—	—	—	—	5	129	**25.8**	73	0	18	121	6.7	30	0	3	1
2017	NE	15	8	86	61	659	10.8	27	2	**40**	—	—	—	—	—	1	16	16.0	16	0	27	231	8.6	40	0	2	0
2018	MIA	15	**15**	79	59	575	9.7	39	1	27	1	−2	−2.0	−2	0	—	—	—	—	—	11	59	5.4	12	0	2	0
2019	DET	15	9	97	62	678	10.9	47	1	36	—	—	—	—	—	—	—	—	—	—	10	55	5.5	15	0	0	0
2020	DET	14	5	69	46	602	**13.1**	50	0	30	1	2	2.0	2	0	—	—	—	—	—	3	39	**13.0**	21	0	0	0
2021	HOU	8	0	38	24	248	10.3	39	3	10	—	—	—	—	—	1	15	15.0	15	0	—	—	—	—	0	0	0
Total		163	76	903	617	6,212	10.1	57	24	334	17	99	5.8	30	0	153	3,590	23.5	84	0	198	1,860	9.4	82	0	18	6

==== Postseason ====
Year	Team	Games		Receiving							Rushing					Kickoff return					Punt return					Fumbles	
Year	Team	GP	GS	Tgt	Rec	Yds	Avg	Lng	TD	FD	Att	Yds	Avg	Lng	TD	Ret	Yds	Avg	Lng	TD	Ret	Yds	Avg	Lng	TD	Fum	Lost
2013	NE	2	1	6	3	77	**25.7**	**53**	0	3	—	—	—	—	—	—	—	—	—	—	—	—	—	—	—	0	0
2014	NE	**3**	1	16	11	137	12.5	51	**3**	7	**1**	−2	−2.0	−2	0	**9**	**213**	**23.7**	**30**	0	—	—	—	—	—	**1**	0
2015	NE	2	**2**	11	7	57	8.1	16	0	2	—	—	—	—	—	—	—	—	—	—	4	54	**13.5**	**28**	0	0	0
2016	NE	**3**	0	15	10	90	9.0	20	1	6	**1**	**15**	**15.0**	**15**	0	—	—	—	—	—	—	—	—	—	—	0	0
2017	NE	**3**	**2**	**33**	**26**	**348**	13.4	50	2	**18**	**1**	3	3.0	3	0	—	—	—	—	—	**5**	**52**	10.4	20	0	0	0
Total		13	6	81	57	709	12.4	53	6	36	3	16	5.3	15	0	9	213	23.7	30	0	9	106	11.8	28	0	1	0

=== College ===
Season	Team	Conf	Class	Pos	GP	Receiving			
Season	Team	Conf	Class	Pos	GP	Rec	Yds	Avg	TD
2004	Texas Tech	Big 12	FR	WR	12	13	119	9.2	1
2005	Texas Tech	Big 12	SO	WR	12	34	395	11.6	3
2006	Texas Tech	Big 12	JR	WR	13	48	487	10.1	5
2007	Texas Tech	Big 12	SR	WR	13	109	1,245	11.4	6
Career					50	204	2,246	11.0	15

== Coaching career ==
On April 4, 2023, he was hired as a coaching assistant and returners coach for the Las Vegas Raiders. They parted ways on February 13, 2024.

== Personal life ==
Amendola's father is Alfred "Willie" Amendola, the former head football coach at Concordia Lutheran High School in Tomball, Texas. In 2011, Willie Amendola was the head coach at Dekaney High School. After the Dekaney Wildcats won the 5A Division II Texas state football championship in December 2011 at Cowboys Stadium, an unmanned cart struck Amendola and a crowd of people. Video footage of the incident went viral. The elder Amendola sued the stadium for more than $1 million, alleging that negligent employees put objects on the floor of the cart that lodged under the gas pedal, causing it to accelerate out of control.

Amendola is half-Italian American (through his father) and half-Irish American (through his mother). Both of his parents are from Boston. In July 2017, Amendola signed a contract to be represented by Ford Models, making him the first NFL player the agency has signed.

In 2017 Amendola appeared, shortly after Super Bowl LI, at New York Fashion Week as a model for Philipp Plein. He was also featured that year with Julian Edelman in a 30-minute NFL Network special, NFL Going Global: Edelman & Amendola, chronicling their promotional trip to Mexico City before the Patriots' 2017 game there.

Amendola participated in the first season of the FOX reality series Special Forces: World's Toughest Test, an American version of the British series SAS: Who Dares Wins, which began airing in January 2023. On March 1, 2023, with only five hours left in the show, Amendola spoke with the "umpire" and stated he was "100% sure" he wanted to leave. This left three recruits remaining at his time of leaving.

In September 2024, Amendola was announced as a competitor on season 33 of Dancing with the Stars, competing with pro dancer Witney Carson. He finished fifth on November 26, 2024.
