= 2004 Holiday Bowl =

2004 Pacific Life Holiday Bowl
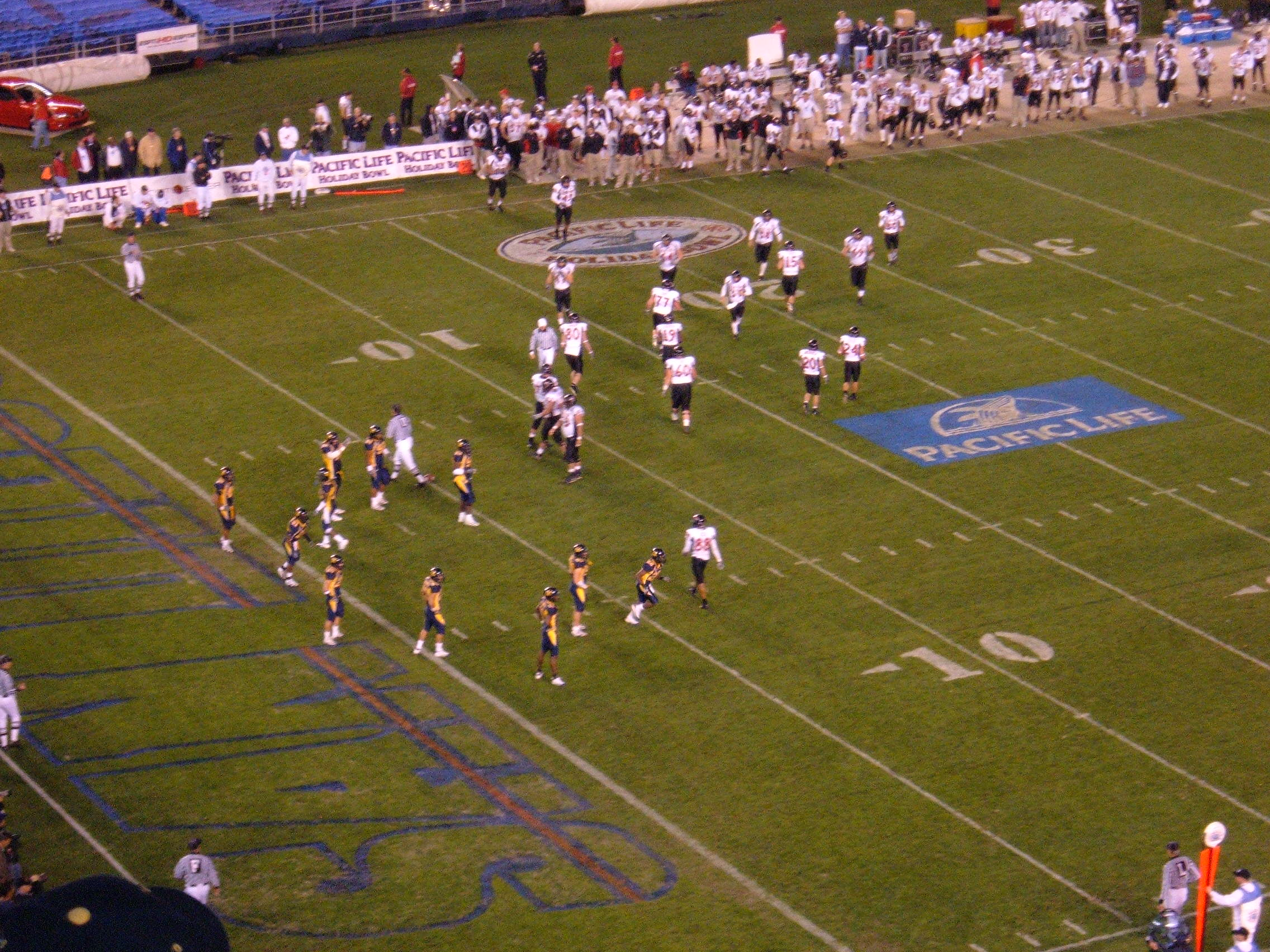
- Texas Tech on offense
Texas Tech Red Raiders	California Golden Bears
(7–4)	(10–1)
Big 12	Pac-10
45	31
Head coach: Mike Leach	Head coach: Jeff Tedford
AP / Coaches / BCS; 23 / 21 / 22	AP / Coaches / BCS; 4 / 4 / 5
	1	2	3	4	Total
Texas Tech	7	17	14	7	45
California	14	0	3	14	31
- Date: December 30, 2004
- Season: 2004
- Stadium: Qualcomm Stadium
- Location: San Diego, California
- MVP: Offensive: Sonny Cumbie, Texas Tech; Defensive: Vincent Meeks, Texas Tech
- Referee: Frank White (WAC)
- Attendance: 63,711
- Payout: US$2,086,815 per team

The 2004 Holiday Bowl was the third bowl game (also the second of three in California) played of the 2004–05 bowl season on December 30, 2004. The game was held at Qualcomm Stadium in San Diego, California, with the Big 12's Texas Tech Red Raiders defeating the Pac-10's California Golden Bears. Cal was edged out for a BCS bowl berth by Texas in the last week of the regular season.

== Teams ==
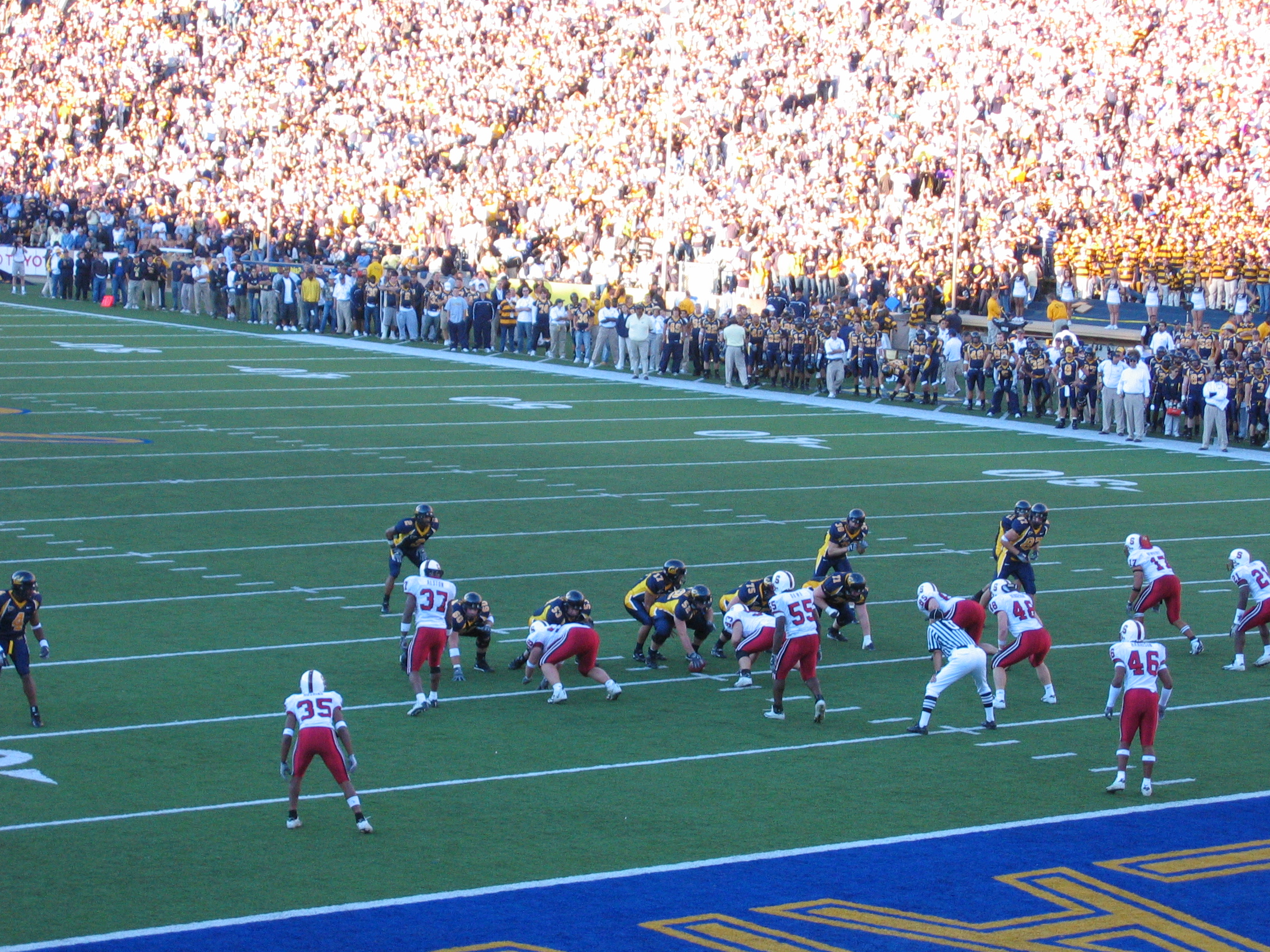
2004 Big Game

In 2004 Cal posted a 10–1 record under head coach Jeff Tedford and quarterback Aaron Rodgers, with their only regular season loss coming against the eventual national champion, USC. They finished the regular season ranked No. 4 according to polls, and appeared to have an excellent chance to receive an at-large BCS bowl berth, most likely in the Rose Bowl. Under normal circumstances, the Bears, as Pac-10 runner-up, would have had first crack at a Rose Bowl berth since conference champion USC was playing for the national championship.

The Bears entered their final game of the regular season ranked No. 4 in BCS standings and a 24-point favorite over Southern Miss. They won 26–16 in a closer than-expected game. With 13 seconds left in the game and Cal with the ball at the Southern Miss 22-yard, Tedford elected to run out the clock instead of attempting to increase the margin of victory to possibly impress some voters. Leading up to the game, Tedford said he had no interest to run up the score.

In a controversial case, the Texas coach Mack Brown made impassioned pleas to media asking poll voters reconsider their final votes. Several Associated Press (AP) voters were besieged by fan emails and phone calls attempting to sway their votes, apparently spurred from Brown's pleas to rank Texas ahead of other "less deserving teams." Nine of the 65 AP voters switched Texas ahead of Cal, and three of them were from Texas. In the Coaches Poll, four voters moved Cal down to No. 7 and two to No. 8, when the week before none had them lower than No. 6. Meanwhile, two coaches moved Texas up to No. 3 when the team did not play that week. The Los Angeles Times wrote that accusations were raised about coaches manipulated voting, but the individual coaches votes were not released to prove or disprove the allegations. The AP Poll makes its voters' records public. No. 6 Texas gained 23 points on No. 4 Cal in the AP poll, and the fifth-ranked Longhorns closed 43 points on the fourth-ranked Bears in the coaches poll. That allowed Texas to earn a BCS berth, finishing .0129 points ahead of Cal in the BCS standings after being .0013 points behind. The Longhorns went on to beat Michigan 38–37 in the Rose Bowl. In part because of the controversy with Cal's BCS ranking, the AP poll withdrew from the BCS after the season.

Texas Tech entered the game with a 7–4 overall record and a 5–3 record in the Big XII. The Red Raiders entered the game with the top-ranked passing offense in the NCAA, averaging just over 399 yards per game, and with the NCAA season leader in passing yardage, Sonny Cumbie. Earlier in the season, Tech had shown its offensive prowess with a 70–10 victory over Nebraska, the most points ever given up by Nebraska in the team's history.

== Game summary ==
Cal played well at first, finishing the first quarter with a 14–7 lead. However, the Texas Tech passing assault exploded after that. In the second and third quarters, the Red Raiders outscored the Bears 31–3, going on to record the biggest upset of the bowl season. Red Raiders quarterback Sonny Cumbie torched the Bears defense for 520 passing yards, going 40-for-60 with three touchdowns and no interceptions. The brightest spot for Cal was running back J.J. Arrington, who ran for 173 yards and a touchdown, making him only the third Pac-10 running back to reach 2,000 yards rushing in a season.

Tech got on the board first with a touchdown pass from Sonny Cumbie to Jarrett Hicks, but the Bears responded with two touchdowns on runs by J.J. Arrington and Marshawn Lynch to go up 14–7 in the first quarter. The Red Raiders outscored the Bears 17–0 in the second quarter, with an Alex Trlica field goal, a touchdown run by Taurean Henderson, and another Cumbie-to-Hicks touchdown pass. Cumbie's second touchdown pass came three plays after Tech's Vincent Meeks intercepted an Aaron Rodgers pass and returned it 48 yards to California's 22-yard line. Meeks was named the Defensive MVP of the game.

In the second half, Tech took the opening kickoff and marched 85 yards in just four plays, scoring on a 60-yard catch and run by Joel Filani to make the score 31–14. Tech's Johnny Mack scored on an 11-yard run later in the third quarter as the Red Raiders took a 38–17 lead into the fourth quarter. California's Aaron Rodgers threw for one touchdown and ran for another in the fourth quarter, but Texas Tech added their final touchdown on a Taurean Henderson run that capped a 12-play drive covering 74 yards.
