= 2005 All-Big 12 Conference football team =

The 2005 All-Big 12 Conference football team consists of American football players chosen as All-Big 12 Conference players for the 2005 Big 12 Conference football season. The conference recognizes two official All-Big 12 selectors: (1) the Big 12 conference coaches selected separate offensive and defensive units and named first- and second-team players (the "Coaches" team); and (2) a panel of sports writers and broadcasters covering the Big 12 also selected offensive and defensive units and named first- and second-team players (the "Media" team).

== Offensive selections ==
=== Quarterbacks ===
- Vince Young, Texas (Coaches-1; Media-1)
- Cody Hodges, Texas Tech (Coaches-2; Media-2)

=== Running backs ===
- Taurean Henderson, Texas Tech (Coaches-1; Media-1)
- Adrian Peterson, Oklahoma (Coaches-1; Media-1)
- Jamaal Charles, Texas (Coaches-2; Media-2)
- Cody Ross, Nebraska (Coaches-2)
- Mike Hamilton, Oklahoma State (Media-2)

=== Centers ===
- Mark Fenton, Colorado (Coaches-1)
- Scott Stephenson, Iowa State (Media-1)
- Kurt Mann, Nebraska (Media-2)

=== Guards ===
- Davin Joseph, Oklahoma (Coaches-1; Media-1)
- Tony Palmer, Missouri (Coaches-1; Media-1)
- Manuel Ramirez, Texas Tech (Coaches-2)
- Kasey Studdard, Texas (Media-2)

=== Tackles ===
- Justin Blalock, Texas (Coaches-1; Media-1)
- Jonathan Scott, Texas (Coaches-1; Media-1)
- Will Allen, Texas (Coaches-1; Media-2)
- Jeromey Clary, Kansas State (Coaches-2; Media-2)
- E. J. Whitley, Texas Tech (Coaches-2; Media-2)
- Corey Hilliard, Oklahoma State (Coaches-2)

=== Tight ends ===
- Joe Klopfenstein, Colorado (Coaches-1; Media-2)
- David Thomas, Texas (Coaches-2; Media-1)

=== Receivers ===
- Jarrett Hicks, Texas Tech (Coaches-1; Media-1)
- Joel Filani, Texas Tech (Coaches-1; Media-1)
- Todd Blythe, Iowa State (Coaches-1; Media-2)
- D'Juan Woods, Oklahoma State (Coaches-2; Media-2)
- Robert Johnson, Texas Tech (Coaches-2)
- Travis Wilson, Oklahoma (Coaches-2)
- Dominique Zeigler, Baylor (Coaches-2)

== Defensive selections ==
=== Defensive linemen ===
- Rodrique Wright, Texas (Coaches-1; Media-1)
- Dusty Dvoracek, Oklahoma (Coaches-1; Media-1)
- Charlton Keith, Kansas (Coaches-1; Media-1)
- Nick Leaders, Iowa State (Coaches-1; Media-2)
- Tim Crowder, Texas (Coaches-1)
- Adam Carriker, Nebraska (Coaches-2; Media-1)
- Brent Curvey, Iowa State (Coaches-2; Media-2)
- Keyunta Dawson, Texas Tech (Coaches-2)
- Calvin Thibodeaux, Oklahoma State (Coaches-2)
- Jermial Ashley, Kansas (Coaches-2)
- Frank Okam, Texas (Coaches-2)
- Johnny Jolly, Texas A&M (Media-2)
- Brian Smith, Missouri (Media-2)

=== Linebackers ===
- Rufus Alexander, Oklahoma (Coaches-1; Media-1)
- Nick Reid, Kansas (Coaches-1; Media-1)
- Aaron Harris, Texas (Coaches-1; Media-1)
- Tim Dobbins, Iowa State (Coaches-2; Media-1)
- Justin Warren, Texas A&M (Coaches-2; Media-2)
- Brian Iwuh, Colorado (Coaches-2)
- Clint Ingram, Oklahoma (Coaches-2)
- Corey McKeon, Nebraska (Media-2)
- Jamar Ransom, Oklahoma State (Media-2)
- Thaddaeus Washington, Colorado (Media-2)

=== Defensive backs ===
- Michael Huff, Texas (Coaches-1; Media-1)
- Dwayne Slay, Texas Tech (Coaches-1; Media-1)
- Cedric Griffin, Texas (Coaches-1; Media-1)
- LaMarcus Hicks, Iowa State (Coaches-1; Media-2)
- Maurice Lane, Baylor (Media-1)
- Charles Gordon, Kansas (Coaches-2)
- Chijioke Onyenegecha, Oklahoma (Coaches-2)
- Daniel Bullocks, Nebraska (Coaches-2; Media-2)
- Vincent Meeks, Texas Tech (Coaches-2)
- Steve Paris, Iowa State (Coaches-2)
- Michael Griffin, Texas (Media-2)
- C. J. Wilson, Baylor (Media-2)

== Special teams ==
=== Kickers ===
- Mason Crosby, Colorado (Coaches-1; Media-1)
- Todd Pregram, Texas A&M (Coaches-2)
- Jordan Congdon, Nebraska (Media-2)

=== Punters ===
- John Torp, Colorado (Coaches-1; Media-2)
- Daniel Sepulveda, Baylor (Coaches-2; Media-1)

=== All-purpose / Return specialists ===
- Charles Gordon, Kansas (Coaches-1; Media-2)
- Stephone Robinson, Colorado (Coaches-2)
- Brad Smith, Missouri (Media-1)

== Key ==
Bold = selected as a first-team player by both the coaches and media panel

Coaches = selected by Big 12 Conference coaches

Media = selected by a media panel

== See also ==
- 2005 College Football All-America Team
