= ACB Agbazuere =

Nigerian politician

ACB Agbazuere (born Anthony Agbazuere) is a Nigerian politician and former Abia State Chief of Staff and the state Commissioner for Information and Strategy in Abia State.

== Career ==
Agbazuere was appointed Chief of Staff to Governor Okezie Ikpeazu in 2019. He was also a former Commissioner for Information and Strategy in Abia State.

He was a candidate for the House of Representatives in the 2023 Nigerian National Assembly elections. He contested on the platform of the Peoples Democratic Party (PDP) to represent the Isiala Ngwa North/South constituency and lost to Ginger Onwusibe of the Labour Party.

== Controversy ==
Agbazuere drew widespread attention in 2020 after being seen on a widely circulated video, spraying wads of cash on Odumeje, a controversial clergy often viewed as a fake prophet. This stoked a huge uproar nationally with a frontline newspaper slamming the trending video as "a video of shame". Many critics called for his prosecution as it is a criminal offence to spray Nigerian Naira notes at social functions.

Agbazuere was arrested in January 2024 on the orders of a Judicial Panel of Enquiry in Abia State for failure to honour an invitation to appear before the panel. He expressed shock at the warrant of arrest, explaining that he was away in Abuja whilst the invitation to the panel was dropped at his gate at home. He was subsequently granted bail

Agbazuere left the People's Democratic Party to the All Progressives Congress in early 2024, leading a host of other loyalists in Abia State in a mass defection. This move attracted condemnation from the People's Democratic Party.

== Personal life ==
Agbazuere was married to late Onyinyechi Agbazuere who died on 4 September 2021 a few days after accompanying him to a new yam festival in Ohuhu, Umuahia, Abia State.
