= Abia State Chief of Staff =

- Website: http://www.abiastate.gov.ng

The Abia State Chief of Staff is the most senior political appointee and an executive branch of the Abia State Government of Nigeria. Appointed by the Governor of Abia State, the Chief of Staff acts as a senior aide to the Governor with the responsibility of assisting and advising the Governor in the administering and managing of the daily affairs of the government.

== List of Chiefs of Staff ==
#	Chief of Staff	Years	Governor
1	Theodore Orji	1999 – 2007	Orji Uzor Kalu
2	Cosmos Ndukwe	2007 – 2015	Theodore Orji
3	Chijioke Nwakodo	2015 – 2017	Okezie Ikpeazu
4	ACB Agbazuere	2019 – 2022	Okezie Ikpeazu
5	Okey Ahiwe	2022 – 2023	Okezie Ikpeazu

== See also ==
- Government of Abia State
