= Charlton Keith =

American gridiron football player (born 1982)

No. 55, 91
- Position: Linebacker

Personal information
- Born: May 4, 1982 (age 44); Akron, Ohio, U.S.
- Listed height: 6 ft 4 in (1.93 m)
- Listed weight: 236 lb (107 kg)

Career information
- College: Kansas
- NFL draft: 2006: undrafted

Career history
- Cleveland Browns (2006)*; Oakland Raiders (2007)*; Hamilton Tiger-Cats (2007–2008); New York Sentinels (2009)
- * Offseason or practice squad member only

Awards and highlights
- First-team All-Big 12 (2005)

Charlton Keith (born May 4, 1982) is an American former football linebacker. He was signed by the Cleveland Browns as an undrafted free agent in 2006. He played college football at Kansas.

Keith was also a member of Cleveland Browns, Oakland Raiders, Hamilton Tiger-Cats and New York Sentinels.

== Early life ==
Keith attended Buchtel High School in Akron, Ohio where he lettered in football and basketball.

== College career ==
Keith played college football with the University of Minnesota, Minnesota West Community College and the University of Kansas.

== Professional career ==
=== Cleveland Browns ===
Undrafted in the 2006 NFL draft, Keith signed with the Cleveland Browns on May 2 only to be released on May 5. He was signed to the Browns practice squad on October 25 where he spent the remainder of the 2006 season.

=== Oakland Raiders ===
In 2007, he was signed by the Oakland Raiders but was cut before the start of training camp.

=== Hamilton Tiger-Cats ===
Keith was signed by the Hamilton Tiger-Cats on September 12, 2007. The team re-signed him on April 24, 2008. He was released on July 21, 2008.
