= Jarrett Hicks =

American football player (born 1984)

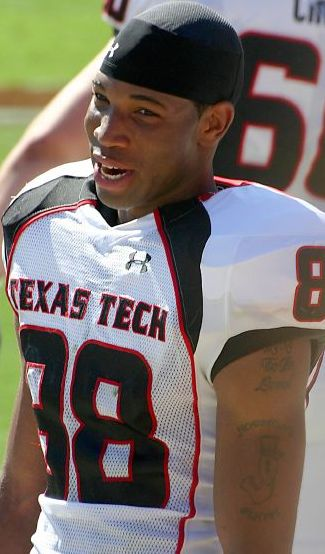
- Hicks at the 2006 Texas A&M game at Kyle Field

No. 88
- Position: Wide receiver

Personal information
- Born: April 4, 1984 (age 42); Houston, Texas, U.S.
- Listed height: 6 ft 3 in (1.91 m)
- Listed weight: 212 lb (96 kg)

Career information
- College: Texas Tech

Career history
- 2007: San Diego Chargers
- 2008: Los Angeles Avengers

Awards and highlights
- 2× First-team All-Big 12 (2004, 2005)

Jarrett Hicks (born on April 4, 1984) is an American former professional football player who was a wide receiver for the Los Angeles Avengers of the Arena Football League (AFL). He played college football for the Texas Tech Red Raiders.

== Career ==
At Texas Tech University, Hicks was a wide receiver for the Red Raiders. Out of college, he signed as an undrafted free agent with the San Diego Chargers of the National Football League. However, Hicks was released from the team on July 30, 2007.

=== Los Angeles Avengers ===
Hicks played for the AFL's Los Angeles Avengers. This reunited him with former teammate, Sonny Cumbie, who was a starting quarterback at Texas Tech and later the starting quarterback for the Avengers.

=== Current job ===
Jarrett Hicks continued his football life by becoming a coach. He now coaches high school football in his home state of Texas.
