= Justin Warren =

American football player (born 1985)

No. 11, 10, 20
- Position: Defensive lineman

Personal information
- Born: April 10, 1985 (age 41); Tyler, Texas, U.S.
- Listed height: 6 ft 3 in (1.91 m)
- Listed weight: 237 lb (108 kg)

Career information
- High school: Robert E. Lee (Tyler)
- College: Texas A&M
- NFL draft: 2007: undrafted

Career history
- New England Patriots (2007)*; Spokane Shock (2008–2009); Dallas Vigilantes (2010–2011); Philadelphia Soul (2012); San Jose SaberCats (2013); Pittsburgh Power (2014)
- * Offseason or practice squad member only

Awards and highlights
- 2× Second-team All-Big 12 (2005, 2006)

Career AFL statistics
- Tackles: 54
- Sacks: 15.5
- Forced fumbles: 6
- Fumble recoveries: 4
- Interceptions: 2
- Stats at ArenaFan.com

Justin Keith Warren (born April 10, 1985) is an American football a former arena football defensive lineman. He was signed on May 8, 2007 as an undrafted rookie free agent from Texas A&M University, but waived on May 15. In 2009, Warren played for the Spokane Shock professional arena football team.

== Early life ==
Justin played football at Robert E. Lee High School in Tyler, Texas. In his senior year, he was named all-American in Parade magazine.

== College career ==
Warren attended Texas A&M University and continued his football career there.

== Professional career ==
=== Dallas Vigilantes ===
Warren advanced to the Arena Football 1 in 2010 with the Dallas Vigilantes.

=== Philadelphia Soul ===
Warren played with the Philadelphia Soul during the 2012 season.

=== San Jose SaberCats ===
In 2012, Warren signed with the San Jose SaberCats for the 2013 season.

=== Pittsburgh Power ===
On September 17, 2013, Warren was traded by the SaberCats to the Pittsburgh Power for future considerations.
