= Keith Joseph (American football) =

American football player (born 1981)

No. 33
- Position: Running back

Personal information
- Born: December 9, 1981 (age 44); Dallas, Texas, U.S.

Career information
- College: Texas A&M

Career history
- 2005-2006: New Orleans Saints
- Stats at Pro Football Reference

Keith Joseph (born December 9, 1981) is an American former professional football player who was a running back for the New Orleans Saints of the National Football League (NFL). He played college football for the Texas A&M Aggies.

== High school and college ==
Born in Dallas, Texas, Joseph attended Lamar High School in Houston, Texas. He was named the Houston Touchdown Club Offensive Player of the Year after rushing for 1,648 yards and 25 touchdowns as a senior. He was injured and did not play as a junior, but earned first-team all-district honors as a sophomore after rushing for 1,237 yards and 17 touchdowns, and was the district's freshman of the year.

Joseph signed with Texas A&M and redshirted in 2000. He started three games in 2001 and finished the season as the team's second leading rusher. Joseph started three games at fullback in 2002, and eight games in 2003, and all 12 as a senior in 2004.

He finished his senior season with 207 yards and three touchdowns on 58 carries. He also had four receptions for 17 yards. At A&M, he was known for his workmanlike style and his rare combination of size, speed, and strength. He stood at 6'2" 256 lb (116 kg). and broke the Texas A&M running back record for the bench press with a lift of 465 lb (211 kg). At the 2005 NFL Combine, he topped all fullbacks when he ran the 40-yard dash in 4.69 (the only fullback under 4.8) and did 27 bench press repetitions with 225 lb (102 kg).

== NFL ==
Although Joseph went undrafted in the 2005 NFL draft, he was signed as an undrafted free agent by the New Orleans Saints on April 27, 2005. He was released after the preseason, but immediately signed to the Saints' practice squad, where he spent the entire season.

Joseph was re-signed by the Saints to a one-year contract in January and began the season as the backup to starting fullback Mike Karney, but suffered a right MCL sprain in his knee during the first game of the season. He was placed on the injured reserve on Sep 13, 2006, ending his 2006 season. He was cut from the Saints in March 2007.
