= Trey Haverty =

American gridiron football player and coach (born 1981)

Current position
- Title: Head coach
- Team: Trinity Christian Academy

Biographical details
- Born: August 21, 1981 (age 45); Richardson, Texas, U.S.

Playing career
- 2000–2004: Texas Tech
- Position: Wide receiver

Coaching career (HC unless noted)
- 2005: Midlothian HS (TX)
- 2006: Cisco College (WR)
- 2007–2009: TCU (GA)
- 2010: Millsaps (DC)
- 2011: TCU (S)
- 2012: TCU (WR)
- 2013–2014: Texas Tech (S)
- 2015: Texas Tech (OLB)
- 2016: Lamar (DC)
- 2017: Texas (DQC)
- 2018–2021: SMU (S)
- 2024: Parish Episcopal School (AHC)
- 2025–present: Trinity Christian Academy (TX)

Accomplishments and honors

Awards
- Third-team All-American (2004)

Trey Haverty (born August 21, 1981) is an American football coach and former player. He is currently the head coach at Trinity Christian Academy in Addison, Texas. He previously served as the defensive coordinator at Lamar University and the safeties coach at Southern Methodist University. Haverty played college football as a wide receiver at Texas Tech University.

== Early life ==
Haverty was born August 21, 1981, in Richardson, Texas to Leighton Haverty and E.R. (Bo) Campbell. His father played football at the college level for LSU. Haverty attended Berkner High School in his home town and was a three-time All-District and All-Area selection. As a junior, he was second statewide in receiving yards.

== College career ==
Haverty played wide receiver for Texas Tech from 2000 to 2004. He was named Second-Team Academic All-Big 12 for the 2003 season. In his senior season in 2004, Haverty was named Second-Team All-American by Sports Illustrated and Third-Team by the Associated Press. Additionally, he led the Big 12 Conference in receptions and was second in receiving yards.

== Coaching career ==
Haverty began his coaching career at Midlothian High School before coaching wide receivers at Cisco College in 2006. He then served several years as a graduate assistant at TCU before spending the 2010 season as the defensive coordinator for Millsaps. In 2011, he returned to TCU to accept the safeties coach position left vacant by Chad Glasgow who had become the defensive coordinator for Texas Tech. Following the 2011 season and Glasgow's return to TCU, Haverty was moved to the wide receivers coaching position.

On December 30, 2012, it was announced that Haverty had accepted a coaching position at his alma mater Texas Tech under head coach Kliff Kingsbury. Haverty was a player at Texas Tech while Kingsbury was the team's starting quarterback.

Haverty was named as Texas Tech's safeties coach for the 2013 season and coached the position for two years. His coaching position was changed to outside linebackers for the 2015 season before being fired in December.

On January 26, 2016, Haverty was named defensive coordinator for the Lamar Cardinals. He replaces Craig McGallion who announced his retirement in November, 2015.

On March 9, 2025, Haverty was named the head coach at Trinity Christian Academy in Addison, Texas.
