= Charles Gordon (American football) =

American football player and coach (born 1984)

No. 41
- Position: Cornerback

Personal information
- Born: July 18, 1984 (age 42); Los Angeles, California, U.S.
- Listed height: 5 ft 11 in (1.80 m)
- Listed weight: 180 lb (82 kg)

Career information
- High school: Santa Monica (Santa Monica, California)
- College: Kansas
- NFL draft: 2006: undrafted

Career history

Playing
- Minnesota Vikings (2006–2008)

Coaching
- Northern Colorado (2013–2016) Defensive backs coach; Denver Broncos (2017–2018) Defensive quality control coach

Awards and highlights
- Third-team All-American (2004); First-team Freshman All-American (2003); 2× First-team All-Big 12 (2004, 2005); Third-team All-Big 12 (2003)

Career NFL statistics
- Total tackles: 76
- Forced fumbles: 1
- Fumble recoveries: 2
- Pass deflections: 8
- Interceptions: 2
- Stats at Pro Football Reference

Charles Gordon (born July 18, 1984) is an American former professional football player who was a cornerback for the Minnesota Vikings of the National Football League (NFL). He played college football for the Kansas Jayhawks and was signed by the Vikings as an undrafted free agent in 2006. He also was a defensive backs coach at the University of Northern Colorado and the defensive quality control coach for the Denver Broncos.

== College career ==
A native of California, he attended Santa Monica High School. Gordon was recruited to play at the University of Kansas as a wide receiver, arriving on campus in 2002. In 2003, as a redshirt freshman, Gordon had 57 pass receptions for 769 yards, both totals set school records for freshmen. These marks were good enough to earn Gordon first-team freshman All-American honors. Gordon finished the season as one of the team's starting cornerbacks in addition to his starting roles as a wide receiver and punt returner. The following season Gordon was moved to defense on a full-time basis. He led the nation in interceptions (7) and earning first-team All-Big 12 and third-team All-American honors. Going into his junior season, Gordon was named a pre-season first-team All-American at cornerback by numerous publications, however, Gordon was moved back to being primarily a wide receiver early in the conference season. For his efforts during his junior campaign, Gordon was named first-team All-Big 12 kick returner, as well as second-team cornerback and honorable mention wide receiver.

At the conclusion of the 2005 season, Gordon announced that he would forgo his senior season to enter the NFL draft.

== Professional career ==
=== Minnesota Vikings ===
Gordon went undrafted in the 2006 NFL draft but signed with the Minnesota Vikings shortly after. Initially signed to the practice squad, Gordon was added to the active roster on November 7, 2006.

Gordon suffered a broken leg on a punt return against the Green Bay Packers on November 9, 2008. The next day he was placed on season ending injured reserve.

== Coaching career ==
=== Northern Colorado ===
In 2013 Gordon became the defensive backs coach at the University of Northern Colorado, a position he held through their 2016 season.

=== Denver Broncos ===
On February 20, 2017, Gordon was named a defensive quality control assistant for the Denver Broncos. Broncos defensive back Aqib Talib was a teammate of Gordon's at Kansas.
