= Cosmos Ndukwe =

Nigerian politician

Cosmos Ndukwe is a Nigerian politician. He was a Deputy Speaker representing Bende South constituency in the 6th Abia State House of Assembly. In 2023, he joined the presidential race on the platform of the Peoples Democratic Party (PDP).
