= Keyunta Dawson =

American football player (born 1985)

No. 96, 62, 75, 55
- Positions: Linebacker, defensive end

Personal information
- Born: September 13, 1985 (age 41); Shreveport, Louisiana, U.S.
- Listed height: 6 ft 3 in (1.91 m)
- Listed weight: 254 lb (115 kg)

Career information
- High school: Evangel Christian Academy (Shreveport, Louisiana)
- College: Texas Tech
- NFL draft: 2007: 7th round, 242nd overall pick

Career history
- Indianapolis Colts (2007–2010); Detroit Lions (2011); Tennessee Titans (2012–2013); New Orleans Saints (2013)

Awards and highlights
- 2× Second-team All-Big 12 (2005, 2006)

Career NFL statistics
- Total tackles: 120
- Sacks: 1.5
- Forced fumbles: 2
- Fumble recoveries: 5
- Stats at Pro Football Reference

Keyunta Dawson (born September 13, 1985) is an American former professional football player who was a linebacker and defensive end in the National Football League (NFL). He was selected by the Indianapolis Colts in the seventh round of the 2007 NFL draft with the 242nd overall pick. Dawson played college football for the Texas Tech Red Raiders.

== College career ==
At Texas Tech University, Dawson played defensive end for the Red Raiders.

== Professional career ==
After spending his first four seasons with the Colts, Dawson signed with the Detroit Lions. He was released by the Lions on September 3, 2011. Dawson was re-signed by the Lions on November 30, 2011, but then released about a month later. On January 6, 2012, the Tennessee Titans signed Dawson. After appearing in only three games, Dawson was placed on injured reserve with a hamstring injury. On March 7, 2013, the Titans re-signed Dawson to a one-year contract. The Titans released Dawson on October 5, 2013, to make room for quarterback Rusty Smith. On October 8, 2013, he signed with the Saints.
