= Chijioke Onyenegecha =

American gridiron football player (born 1983)

No. 16
- Position: Defensive back

Personal information
- Born: March 15, 1983 (age 43); El Sobrante, California
- Listed height: 6 ft 3 in (1.91 m)
- Listed weight: 209 lb (95 kg)

Career information
- College: Oklahoma

Career history
- 2007: Winnipeg Blue Bombers
- 2010: Edmonton Eskimos*
- * Offseason or practice squad member only

Awards and highlights
- Second-team All-Big 12 (2005)

Chijioke Onyenegecha (born March 15, 1983, in El Sobrante, California) is a former defensive back who last played for the Edmonton Eskimos in the Canadian Football League.

Prior to the Canadian Football League, he played cornerback for the University of Oklahoma (2004 and 2005) after transferring from City College of San Francisco.
