= Cody Hodges =

American football player (born 1982)

No. 10
- Position: Quarterback

Personal information
- Born: November 20, 1982 (age 43); Amarillo, Texas, U.S.
- Listed height: 6 ft 0 in (1.83 m)
- Listed weight: 207 lb (94 kg)

Career information
- High school: Hereford (TX)
- College: Texas Tech
- NFL draft: 2006: undrafted

Career history
- Tennessee Titans (2006)*; Oklahoma City Yard Dawgz (2007)*; Fort Wayne Fusion (2007)
- * Offseason or practice squad member only

Awards and highlights
- Second-team All-Big 12 (2005)

Cody Hodges (born November 20, 1982) is a philanthropist, motivational speaker, and former professional American football player, playing in the National Football League (NFL), Arena Football League (AFL), and the Arena League 2.

Hodges is best known for his one season as the starting quarterback for the Texas Tech Red Raiders during the 2005 season. As a fifth-year senior, he led the nation in passing and total offense, made an appearance in the 2006 Cotton Bowl Classic, and had a 9–3 overall record. He was the third straight fifth-year senior to start for Mike Leach and Texas Tech, and was the second of four West Texas natives to take the quarterback reins in the Leach era, along with predecessor Sonny Cumbie and successors Taylor Potts and Seth Doege.

== Early life ==
Hodges was born to Steve and Sharon Hodges in Amarillo, Texas, and was raised in Hereford, Texas, in the Texas Panhandle.

He played high school football at Hereford High School, where he was a four-year letterman in football and a standout in basketball. He threw for 2,458 yards and 28 touchdowns in 2000 as a senior. He ended his prep career with a 22-4 record as starting quarterback, accounted for 70 touchdown passes and 6,500 passing yards over four years, and ran for 30 touchdowns during that time. Hodges was also a two-time 3-4A District MVP. He was named Amarillo Globe-News Newcomer of the Year in 1997, Amarillo Globe-News Player of the Year in his junior and senior years, and All-South Plains Player of the Year in 2000. He was named to the second-team all-state in 1999. Hodges was named to the Lubbock Avalanche-Journal Top 100 players, and was ranked by Lonestar.com as one of the top 100 quarterbacks in the nation. Despite his stellar high school career, he was only offered scholarships by two FBS schools, Texas Tech University and The University of Wyoming. He accepted a scholarship from Texas Tech coach Mike Leach.

== Early college career, 2001–2004 ==
Hodges redshirted his first year at Texas Tech in 2001. He made his career debut against Baylor University as a redshirt freshman in 2002, completing one pass for 10 yards. He served as backup for four years, backing up Kliff Kingsbury, B. J. Symons, and Sonny Cumbie. Hodges moved up a slot in the depth chart every year. From 2001 to 2004, he appeared in seven games, completing eight passes out of 12 attempts, for 70 yards and two touchdowns, completing 67 percent of his passes. He also rushed for 33 yards on three attempts.

=== 2005 season ===
Hodges won the starting quarterback job for the 2005 season, winning a hard-fought battle over highly-touted redshirt freshman Graham Harrell. He started the year in stellar fashion, putting up big numbers in blowout wins over Florida International University 56-3, Indiana State University 63-7, and Sam Houston State University 80-21. Hodges drew controversy after the win against SHSU by saying that he believed Tech's offense was good enough to "score 100 points."

Big 12 play started and he led the Red Raiders to a win over Kansas 30-17. The Red Raiders then traveled to Lincoln, Nebraska to play Nebraska. The Huskers were playing on their homecoming day and were looking to take revenge for being humiliated by Tech the previous year in Lubbock by giving up 70 points. Hodges led the Raiders on a game-winning drive and threw a 10-yard touchdown pass on 4th down to win the game and snap Nebraska's 36 year homecoming winning streak.

Hodges had a career day the next week as Tech beat Kansas State, 59-20. He threw for 646 yards for a career best.

After the big win against Nebraska and the career day against KSU, Hodges led the Red Raiders, ranked in the top 10 for the first time under Mike Leach, to Austin, Texas to face off with the eventual national champion Texas Longhorns led by Vince Young. Hodges had the Raiders in an early lead in Austin, but could not keep up the momentum as Tech suffered their first loss, 52-17. Tech rebounded with wins over rivals Baylor 28-0, and Texas A&M 56-17. Tech later lost on a BCS bowl bid by being upset by a four-win Oklahoma State team, 24-17. The Raiders rebounded to defeat Oklahoma 23-21 in another close game, with Hodges leading the Raiders on the final drive, giving the Red Raiders a regular season record of 9-2, and a Big 12 record of 6-2, earning them second place overall in the Big 12 and an invitation to the Cotton Bowl. Hodges finished the regular season first in the nation in passing, making him the fourth consecutive Tech quarterback to do so.

=== 2006 Cotton Bowl Classic ===
Hodges led the 9-2 (6-2 in Big 12 play) Red Raiders, ranked #18 in the AP Poll and #1 in total offense, to the 2006 Cotton Bowl Classic to play the #13 Alabama Crimson Tide, ranking #1 in scoring defense and #2 in total defense. Hodges, statistically, had his worst game as a starter, completing only 15 of 32 passes for 196 yards and one touchdown. He was also Tech's leading rusher, gaining 66 yards on 17 carries. Texas Tech lost 13-10 and ended the season with a 9–3 overall record and #20 in the AP Poll. Hodges finished his career at Tech completing 360 passes out of 543 attempts for 4,267 yards with 33 passing touchdowns and 13 interceptions. He also rushed for 224 career yards and three rushing touchdowns. He was noted as the best running quarterback Tech had, and also for his passing form, in which he threw his passes without the aid of the laces of the football.

=== Statistics ===
Legend
	Led NCAA Division I FBS
**Bold**	Career high

Season	Team	Games			Passing								Rushing			
Season	Team	GP	GS	Record	Cmp	Att	Pct	Yds	Y/A	TD	Int	Rtg	Att	Yds	Avg	TD
2001	Texas Tech	0	0	—	Redshirted (redshirt)											
2002	Texas Tech	2	0	—	1	2	50.0	10	5.0	0	1	–8.0	1	2	2.0	0
2003	Texas Tech	1	0	—	1	1	100.0	6	6.0	0	0	150.4	0	0	0.0	0
2004	Texas Tech	4	0	—	5	9	55.6	54	6.0	2	0	179.3	2	31	15.5	0
2005	Texas Tech	12	12	9–3	353	531	66.5	4,197	147.6	31	12	147.6	109	191	1.8	3
Career		19	12	9–3	360	543	66.3	4,267	7.9	33	13	147.6	112	224	2.0	3

== Professional career ==
=== Tennessee Titans ===
Despite a successful 2005 season, Hodges went undrafted in the 2006 NFL draft. However, he was signed by the Tennessee Titans. He came second to the top pick of the Titans' Vince Young, and was Young's back-up at quarterback. Hodges performed well in the pre-season, but was released when the Titans signed Kerry Collins to back up Young.

=== Arena League ===
Hodges signed with the Oklahoma City Yard Dawgz of af2 ahead of the 2007 season. He was defeated by Stan Hill in the competition for the starting quarterback job, and Oklahoma City later traded Hodges to the expansion Fort Wayne Fusion shortly before the season began, while naming Jerad Romo as Hill's backup.

Hodges opened the year as Fort Wayne's starting quarterback and earned Schutt Offensive Player of the Game honors during Week 1 of the af2 season following his performance against the Green Bay Blizzard. During a Week 5 matchup against the Albany Conquest, Hodges suffered a concussion and was forced to leave the game. He missed the following week's contest against the Cincinnati Jungle Kats before returning in a loss against the Louisville Fire. Fort Wayne rebounded the following week with a victory over the Tennessee Valley Vipers, as Hodges completed 17 of 24 passes for 240 yards and six touchdowns without throwing an interception. However, during a rematch against Albany the following week, he suffered a Grade 3 concussion that prematurely ended his season. Despite appearing in only eight games, Hodges ranked among the af2's leading rushers while playing at quarterback. He totaled 224 rushing yards on 41 carries (5.5 yards per carry) with nine touchdowns, leading all qualified players with 28 rushing yards per game. As a passer, he completed 130 of 228 attempts for 1,402 yards and 29 touchdowns.

Hodges retired from professional football in 2008.

== Philanthropy ==
Hodges, having viewed a presentation from Rachel's Challenge, an organization dedicated to abolishing prejudice and promoting kindness and good deeds, was inspired to join the organization as a speaker at age 20. After his professional football career ended, he joined Rachel's Challenge as a full-time motivational speaker, engaging in philanthropy on behalf of the organization as well. Hodges visits smaller high schools in rural towns across America to spread the message of kindness to others.

== Personal ==
Hodges is married, and lives in the Dallas-Ft. Worth Metroplex, when not traveling the country with Rachel's challenge.

His father played football at the University of Houston. He has a twin brother, Slade Hodges, who played slot receiver for Texas Tech in the same years as his brother. Cody completed a 10-yard pass to his brother during the 2005 Texas Tech-Texas A&M game, and later watched from the sidelines as his brother caught a touchdown in the 4th quarter of the same game.
