= Sonny Cumbie =

American football player and coach (born 1981)

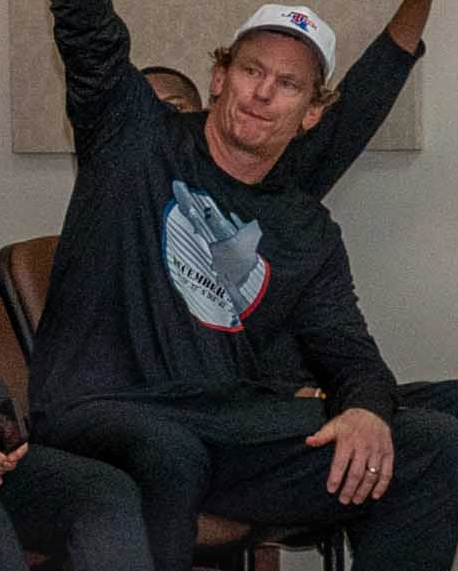
- Cumbie in 2025

Current position
- Title: Head coach
- Team: Louisiana Tech
- Conference: Sun Belt
- Record: 28–33

Biographical details
- Born: August 8, 1981 (age 45); Abilene, Texas, U.S.
- Education: Texas Tech University

Playing career
- 2000–2004: Texas Tech
- 2005: Indianapolis Colts (Note: Offseason and/or practice squad member only.)
- 2006: Los Angeles Avengers
- 2006: Baltimore Ravens
- 2007–2008: Los Angeles Avengers
- 2009: San Angelo Stampede Express
- Position: Quarterback

Coaching career (HC unless noted)
- 2009: San Angelo Stampede Express
- 2009–2010: Texas Tech (GA)
- 2011–2012: Texas Tech (WR)
- 2013: Texas Tech (co-OC/WR)
- 2014–2016: TCU (co-OC/QB)
- 2017–2020: TCU (OC/QB)
- 2021: Texas Tech (OC/QB)
- 2021: Texas Tech (interim HC) (Note: Cumbie took over as the interim after Matt Wells was fired after 8 games)
- 2022–present: Louisiana Tech

Administrative career (AD unless noted)
- 2009: San Angelo Stampede Express (director of player personnel)

Head coaching record
- Overall: 30–36 (NCAA); 2–2 (IFL)
- Bowls: 2–1

Accomplishments and honors

Awards
- NCAA passing yards leader (2004)

Sonny Jack Cumbie (born August 8, 1981) is an American football coach and former quarterback. He currently serves as the head football coach at Louisiana Tech University, a position he has held since the 2022 season. Cumbie previously served as the offensive coordinator and quarterbacks coach at Texas Tech University and was the interim head coach after the departure of Matt Wells in 2021. He also served as the offensive coordinator and quarterbacks coach at Texas Christian University (TCU). Cumbie played college football at Texas Tech and was the team's starting quarterback during the 2004 season, when he led the nation in passing and total offense and guided the Red Raiders to win in the 2004 Holiday Bowl, earning MVP honors for the game. Cumbie played professionally in the Arena Football League (AFL), the Indoor Football League (IFL), and briefly in the National Football League (NFL).

== Early life ==
Cumbie attended Snyder High School in Snyder, Texas, and was a three-sport letterman in football, basketball, and baseball. In football, as a senior, he won first team All-District honors, Honorable Mention All-South Plains honors, and was named the District MVP He was coached by David Baugh, the son of quarterback Sammy Baugh. In basketball, he won All-District honors and All-Big Country honors. In baseball, he was named the District MVP as a senior. Cumbie graduated from Snyder High School in 2000. He received scholarship offers from Tarleton State University and West Texas A&M University. Cumbie declined them both and enrolled at Texas Tech University, about 80 miles from Snyder, and decided to accept an invitation to walk on to the football team from head coach Mike Leach.

== College career ==
=== 2000–2003 ===
Cumbie walked on at Texas Tech, where he had enrolled as a student. Cumbie was on the scout team during the 2000 season, and earned a scholarship to be on the team prior to the 2001 season. He served as third-string quarterback behind Kliff Kingsbury and B. J. Symons during the 2001 season. Cumbie saw his first action during a 2002 win over New Mexico. He completed his first pass against Baylor University. After Kingsbury graduated, Symons was named the starter and Cumbie became the back-up. Tech blew out many opponents that year, giving Cumbie plenty of mop up time. He threw his first and only touchdown as a back-up against Baylor in a 62–0 rout in 2003. Prior to the 2004 season, he completed 40 passes out of 62 attempts for 374 yards and a touchdown with a 65.5 completion percentage.

=== 2004 ===
Cumbie earned the starting spot for the 2004 season over highly recruited junior college quarterback Robert Johnson and redshirt junior Cody Hodges. Cumbie led the Raiders to 7 regular season wins over SMU (27–13), TCU (70–35), Kansas (31–30), Nebraska (70–10), Kansas State (35–25), Baylor (42–17), and Oklahoma State (31–15). The Raiders were upset by New Mexico 27–24 and lost close games to division rivals Oklahoma (28–13), an overtime loss to Texas A&M (32–25), and were also defeated by the University of Texas (51–21). The Raiders finished the regular season 7–4, with a 5–3 conference record tied for third in the Big 12 South, and were invited to play a top 5 University of California team in the Holiday Bowl. Cumbie finished the regular season as the national leader in passing yards and passing offense.

Cumbie lead #23 ranked Texas Tech to a win in the 2004 Holiday Bowl over Aaron Rodgers, who led the #4 California Golden Bears. The Raiders were huge underdogs, but Cumbie went 39–60 (65%) and a career-high 520 yards and three touchdowns to lead the Raiders to the win. His performance in that game earned him M.V.P. honors. Cumbie finished his Senior season with 4,742 passing yards, completing 65.6 percent of his passes for 32 touchdown passes and 18 interceptions, and became the third straight Red Raider quarterback to lead the nation in passing.

== Professional career ==
=== Los Angeles Avengers ===
After completing his college career, Cumbie was not drafted in the 2005 draft but was signed as a free agent by the Indianapolis Colts and later released. In 2006 Cumbie then joined the Los Angeles Avengers in the Arena Football League. He started 12 games his first season as a rookie, and won Rookie of the Year. Cumbie was invited back to the NFL by the Baltimore Ravens and signed a free agent contract in 2006 but was released. He returned as the Avengers starting quarterback in 2007. Playing in a total of 13 games in 2006, Cumbie completed 268-of-450 for 3,241 yards and 59 touchdowns in 2006. He also scored three touchdowns on the ground. In 2007 Cumbie led the Avengers to the playoffs while throwing for 83 touchdown passes and 4,370 yards.

=== San Angelo Stampede Express ===
After the Arena Football League folded in 2009, Cumbie joined the San Angelo Stampede of the Indoor Football League as head coach and director of player personnel. He was hired on January 8, 2009. The Stampede Express won their first two games of the season before losing the next two. On May 6, 2009, Cumbie stepped down from his coaching duties and became the team’s starting quarterback for the remainder of the season. Billy Jack Ray was named interim head coach for the rest of the year. Cumbie appeared in ten games, starting all ten, and led the team to a 3–7 record. He completed 175 of 318 pass attempts for 1977 yards, threw 43 touchdowns against 13 interceptions, and recorded a passer rating of 90.6. He also rushed 17 times for 71 yards and three touchdowns. The team won two of its final three games to qualify for the playoffs. Cumbie led the Stampede Express to the first playoff win in franchise history against the Abilene RuffRiders before the team was eliminated by the top-seeded El Paso Generals.

== Coaching career ==
=== Texas Tech (first stint) ===
In 2009, Cumbie began his coaching career at Texas Tech as a graduate assistant under head coach Mike Leach where he was in charge of the defensive scout team and coaching the quarterbacks. In this role, he worked with quarterbacks Taylor Potts, Steven Sheffield, and Seth Doege. Cumbie served in this capacity for two seasons.

After Leach's departure, Tommy Tuberville was hired as the head coach for the team. He promoted Cumbie to inside receivers coach, a post held formerly by current University of Southern California head coach Lincoln Riley. One of the receivers he coached was Eric Ward.

Following the hiring of coach Kliff Kingsbury after the subsequent departure of Tommy Tuberville from Texas Tech, Cumbie was the only assistant retained by Kingsbury. Cumbie was promoted along with Eric Morris to be co-offensive coordinator prior to the start of the 2013 season. During that season, Tech would score 465 points and win the Holiday Bowl over 16th ranked Arizona State. As a team, they threw for 5,107 yards and 35 touchdowns while running for 1,593 yards (including sacks) and 19 touchdowns.

=== TCU ===
Stefan Stevenson reported that Cumbie would become the offensive coordinator and quarterbacks coach at Texas Christian University (TCU) for the 2014 season. Gary Patterson hired Cumbie hoping that he would implement the popular Air raid offense at TCU that he had run at Texas Tech. This marked a shift in philosophy as TCU had played a pro-style offense before Cumbie's arrival. The move proved to be successful as TCU was in the top 3 offensively in his first 2 seasons. Cumbie interviewed in 2016 for the University of Texas offensive coordinator job, ultimately deciding to stay at TCU when he received a pay raise that made him the highest paid offensive coordinator in the country. The offense struggled in his last two seasons as opposing teams adapted to an unchanging scheme.

=== Texas Tech (second stint) ===
On December 21, 2020, Cumbie was hired and returned to Texas Tech as their offensive coordinator and quarterbacks coach under head coach Matt Wells. Wells was fired on October 25, 2021, with Cumbie being named the interim head coach.

On November 24, 2021, Cumbie was retained as offensive coordinator and quarterbacks coach under new head coach Joey McGuire.

=== Louisiana Tech ===
On November 30, 2021, Cumbie was named the 34th head coach at Louisiana Tech University.

== Career statistics ==
=== Playing career ===
==== AFL ====
AFL regular season
Year	Team	Games			Passing								Rushing			
Year	Team	GP	GS	Record	Cmp	Att	Pct	Yds	Y/A	TD	Int	Rtg	Att	Yds	Y/A	TD
2006	LA	13	12	4–8	268	449	59.7	3,244	7.2	59	10	105.5	24	-50	-2.1	3
2007	LA	16	16	9–7	378	617	61.3	4,376	7.1	83	13	107.5	20	-53	-2.7	2
2008	LA	12	9	3–6	208	371	56.1	2,598	7.0	51	15	95.5	6	18	3.0	0
Career		41	37	16–21	854	1,437	59.4	10,218	7.1	193	38	103.8	50	-35	-0.7	5

==== IFL ====
IFL regular season
Year	Team	Games			Passing								Rushing			
Year	Team	GP	GS	Record	Cmp	Att	Pct	Yds	Y/A	TD	Int	Rtg	Att	Yds	Y/A	TD
2009	SA	10	10	3–7	175	318	55.0	1,977	6.2	43	13	90.6	17	71	4.2	3
Career		10	10	3–7	175	318	55.0	1,977	6.2	43	13	90.6	17	71	4.2	3

==== College ====
Legend
	Led FBS
**Bold**	Career high

Season	Team	Games			Passing								Rushing			
Season	Team	GP	GS	Record	Cmp	Att	Pct	Yds	Y/A	TD	Int	Rtg	Att	Yds	Avg	TD
2000	Texas Tech	0	0	—	Redshirted (redshirt)											
2001	Texas Tech	0	0	—	DNP											
2002	Texas Tech	2	0	—	5	6	**83.3**	34	5.7	0	0	130.9	0	0	0.0	0
2003	Texas Tech	6	0	—	35	56	62.5	340	6.1	1	1	115.8	6	**1**	**0.2**	0
2004	Texas Tech	**12**	**12**	**8–4**	**421**	**642**	65.6	**4,742**	**7.4**	**32**	**18**	**138.5**	**52**	-167	-3.2	**2**
Career		20	12	8–4	461	704	65.5	5,116	7.3	33	19	136.6	58	-166	-2.9	2

=== Head coaching record ===
==== College ====
Year	Team	Overall	Conference	Standing	Bowl/playoffs	Coaches^{#}	AP^{°}
**Texas Tech Red Raiders** (Big 12 Conference) (2021)
2021	Texas Tech	2–3	1–3	9th	**W** Liberty		
Texas Tech:		2–3	1–3				
**Louisiana Tech Bulldogs** (Conference USA) (2022–2025)
2022	Louisiana Tech	3–9	2–6	T–9th			
2023	Louisiana Tech	3–9	2–6	T–6th			
2024	Louisiana Tech	5–8	4–4	5th	**L** Independence		
2025	Louisiana Tech	8–5	5–3	T–4th	**W** Independence		
**Louisiana Tech Bulldogs** (Sun Belt Conference) (2026–present)
2026	Louisiana Tech	9–2	7–0	1st (West)			
Louisiana Tech:		28–33	20–19				
Total:		30–36					

==== IFL ====
Team	Year	Regular season					Postseason			
Team	Year	Won	Lost	Ties	Win %	Finish	Won	Lost	Win %	Result
San Angelo	2009	2	2	0	.500	(Note: Cumbie stepped down as head coach on May 6, 2009 and became the team's starting quarterback for the remainder of the season, with Billy Jack Ray taking over as interim head coach.)				
Total		2	2	0	.500					

== Personal life ==
Cumbie was a color commentator for the Texas Tech Football Radio network for three seasons (2005–2008), shortly before joining the Tech coaching staff. He currently resides in Ruston, Louisiana, and is married to his wife, Tamra. Cumbie graduated from Texas Tech with a bachelor's degree in history. Tamra, who is an alumna of Texas Tech, has a master's degree in technical communication. They have two children.

== See also ==
- List of NCAA major college football yearly passing leaders
- List of NCAA major college football yearly total offense leaders
