= Brandon Rideau =

American gridiron football player (born 1982)

No. 84, 16
- Position: Wide receiver

Personal information
- Born: October 18, 1982 (age 44); Beaumont, Texas, U.S.
- Listed height: 6 ft 4 in (1.93 m)
- Listed weight: 211 lb (96 kg)

Career information
- High school: Beaumont (TX) Ozen
- College: Kansas
- NFL draft: 2005: undrafted

Career history
- Cleveland Browns (2005); Chicago Bears (2006–2008); Toronto Argonauts (2010–2011)
- Stats at Pro Football Reference

Brandon Rideau (born October 18, 1982) is an American former professional football wide receiver. He played college football at Kansas and was signed as an undrafted free agent by the Cleveland Browns.

In his career, Rideau was also a member of the Toronto Argonauts and Chicago Bears.

== Early life ==
Rideau attended Ozen High School, and played quarterback throughout much his high school career. He switched to wide receiver as a senior and had 39 receptions for 800 yards. He was a first-team all-district selection. Rideau also played basketball for four years with his team going 36-0 and winning the Texas 4A state championship as a senior, as well as lettering in track as a standout member of the 400-meter relay team.

== College career ==
Rideau competed at and finished his collegiate career at the University of Kansas two receptions shy of the school record, with 131 catches for 1,636 yards (12.5 avg.) and 14 TDs in 43 career games with the Jayhawks.

== Professional career ==
=== Cleveland Browns ===
Rideau was signed as an undrafted free agent by the Cleveland Browns in 2005 and made the final squad, but injuries kept him from playing in a regular-season game. He was waived by the Browns during the 2006 preseason.

=== Chicago Bears ===
Rideau spent the 2006 season on the Chicago Bears practice squad. He was waived by the Bears on August 27, 2007, during the 2007 NFL preseason.

In the 2008 preseason with the Bears, three of the first four passes Rideau caught went for touchdowns, and he finished with five catches for 127 yards and a team-high 25.4 yards-per-catch average. He was released on August 31 during final cuts, but was re-signed to the Bears' practice squad a day later.

Rideau was signed to the active roster on November 21, 2008. He played in two regular-season games, but did not catch a pass. He was waived on September 4, 2009.

=== Toronto Argonauts ===
On February 12, 2010, Rideau signed with the Toronto Argonauts of the Canadian Football League. While with the Argos, he had 22 starts over two seasons. In those two seasons, he caught 67 passes for 997 yards, and six touchdowns. In August 2011, during a game against the Hamilton Tiger-Cats, he caught six passes for 147 yards, scored two touchdowns, and was named the CFL Offensive Player of the Week. He was released on November 15, 2011.
