= Trent Shelton =

American football player (born 1984)

No. 13
- Position: Wide receiver

Personal information
- Born: September 21, 1984 (age 42); Little Rock, Arkansas, U.S.
- Listed height: 6 ft 0 in (1.83 m)
- Listed weight: 202 lb (92 kg)

Career information
- College: Baylor
- NFL draft: 2007: undrafted

Career history
- Indianapolis Colts (2007)*; Seattle Seahawks (2008)*; Washington Redskins (2009)*; Tulsa Talons (2011)
- * Offseason or practice squad member only

Career AFL statistics
- Receptions: 43
- Receiving yards: 602
- Receiving touchdowns: 9
- Stats at ArenaFan.com

Trent Simmons Shelton (born September 21, 1984) is a former American football wide receiver, author, and motivational speaker. He is the founder and president of a Christian-based non-profit organization, RehabTime. During March 2009, Shelton started making two-minute videos to track his progress of bettering his life and would always end the videos with, "It's RehabTime." He was raised in Fort Worth, Texas, and wanted to become a professional football player when he grew up. He played college football for Baylor. He was signed by the Indianapolis Colts as an undrafted free agent in 2007.

Shelton was also a member of the Seattle Seahawks, Washington Redskins, and Tulsa Talons.

After his football career ended, Shelton built a large audience as a motivational speaker and online creator through videos branded “Rehab Time,” Shelton has framed his message around redefining failure, saying in a CBS News interview that "failure is only when you quit" and that failure is "really feedback". By 2022, Shelton had a following of more than 50 million across platforms.

Shelton is the author of several motivational books, including The Greatest You (2019) and Protect Your Peace: Nine Unapologetic Principles for Thriving in a Chaotic World (2024).
