= Alex Trlica =

American football player (born 1984)

Profile
- Position: Placekicker

Personal information
- Born: August 11, 1984 (age 42); Friendswood, Texas, U.S.
- Listed height: 5 ft 11 in (1.80 m)
- Listed weight: 176 lb (80 kg)

Career information
- High school: Friendswood
- College: Texas Tech Red Raiders (2004–2007)

Alex Trlica (born August 11, 1984) is an American former football placekicker for the Texas Tech Red Raiders football team.

As of January 9, 2007, Trlica held the NCAA record for successful point after tries. During his college career, he made 233 consecutive PATs without a miss. This, along with his field goals, put him among the nation's top all-time leading scorers for kickers and number two on Tech's all-time scoring list.

== Bowl wins ==
A Trlica 52-yard field goal tied the 2006 Insight Bowl sending it into overtime and resulting in an eventual record-setting victory for the Red Raiders. The following season, it was Trlica's 41-yard field goal that capped-off a come-from-behind win in the 2008 Gator Bowl.
