= Taurean Henderson =

American football player (born 1983)

No. 19
- Position: Running back

Personal information
- Born: January 20, 1983 (age 43); Gatesville, Texas, U.S.
- Listed height: 5 ft 9 in (1.75 m)
- Listed weight: 210 lb (95 kg)

Career information
- High school: Gatesville
- College: Texas Tech
- NFL draft: 2006: undrafted

Career history
- Minnesota Vikings (2006); Atlanta Falcons (2006–2007)

Awards and highlights
- First-team All-Big 12 (2005)

Taurean Levar Henderson (born January 20, 1983), is an American former football player. He is a multi-purpose running back and is currently a coach with the Texas Revolution of the Indoor Football League (IFL).

== Early life ==
Born the son of KeSandra Henderson and Archie Ward, Taurean attended Gatesville High School, in Gatesville, Texas. There he played for coach Kiff Hardin. He senior season he rushed for 2,953 yards and 32 touchdowns on 386 carries, helping lead Gatesville to Class 3A State Championship. For his high school career, he rushed for 6,337 yards and had 76 touchdowns. After his senior season, he received many honors and was named Fort Worth Star-Telegram First-team All-State, the 17-3A District MVP, Super Centex Player of the Year, Killeen Supreme Team Offensive Player of the Year, Associated Press First-team All-State, Texas Sportswriters Association Offensive Player of the Year, and was named to the Lubbock Avalanche-Journal Top 100 list. He was recruited by Baylor, Texas Tech, TCU and Kansas.

== College career ==
Taurean committed to play football at Texas Tech. Although having never rushed for 1,000 yards in a season due to Tech's predominantly passing-based offense, he averaged more than 75 receptions a season since his sophomore year. As of 2006, he ranked third in all-time receptions, out of all players including wide receivers. He has caught over 300 passes in his career. He is in second place on the Tech career receptions list with 236 and trails all-time leader Wes Welker by 23. He is second on the career touchdowns list at Tech with 47 and is in third place at Tech with 33 career rushing scores. He is also second with 282 career points and trails all-time leader James Gray (1986–89) by 30 points. His 78 receptions in 2003 ranks fifth on the Tech single-season list.

=== Records Held ===
- Tech Junior Scoring - 108 points (2004)
- Tech Sophomore Receptions - 78 (2003)
- NCAA Freshman Receptions - 98 (2002)
- Tech Freshman Receptions - 98 (2002)
- Tech Freshman Single-Game Receptions - 13 vs. A&M (2002)
- Tech Freshman Single-Season Receiving Yards - 633 (2002)
- Tech Freshman Single-Season All-Purpose Yards - 1,453 (2002)

== Professional career ==
=== Minnesota Vikings ===
Although he was projected by some as a mid-round NFL prospect, Henderson went unchosen in the 2006 NFL draft. However, immediately following the draft he signed as a free agent with the Minnesota Vikings. After spending a few months in training camp, he was released on July 27.

=== Atlanta Falcons ===
He has since been signed by the Atlanta Falcons, who allocated him to NFL Europa where he played for the Rhein Fire.

== See also ==
- List of Division I FBS rushing touchdown leaders
