= 2009 Texas Tech Red Raiders football team =

American college football season

2009 Texas Tech Red Raiders football

Alamo Bowl champion

Alamo Bowl, W 41–31 vs. Michigan State
- Conference: Big 12 Conference
- South Division

Ranking
- Coaches: No. 23
- AP: No. 21
- Record: 9–4 (5–3 Big 12)
- Head coach: Mike Leach (10th season; regular season); Ruffin McNeill (interim; bowl game)
- Offensive coordinator: Lincoln Riley (interim; bowl game)
- Offensive scheme: Air raid
- Defensive coordinator: Ruffin McNeill (3rd season)
- Base defense: 4–3
- Captains: Brandon Carter; Ra'Jon Henley; Taylor Potts; Jamar Wall
- Home stadium: Jones AT&T Stadium

2009 Big 12 Conference football standings
	Conf.			Overall
Team	W		L	W		L
North Division
No. 14 Nebraska x	6	–	2	10	–	4
Missouri	4	–	4	8	–	5
Kansas State	4	–	4	6	–	6
Iowa State	3	–	5	7	–	6
Colorado	2	–	6	3	–	9
Kansas	1	–	7	5	–	7
South Division
No. 2 Texas x$	8	–	0	13	–	1
Oklahoma State	6	–	2	9	–	4
No. 21 Texas Tech	5	–	3	9	–	4
Oklahoma	5	–	3	8	–	5
Texas A&M	3	–	5	6	–	7
Baylor	1	–	7	4	–	8
Championship: Texas 13, Nebraska 12
$ – BCS representative as conference champion; x – Division champion/co-champions; Rankings from AP Poll

The 2009 Texas Tech Red Raiders football team represented Texas Tech University as a member of the Big 12 Conference during the 2009 NCAA Division I FBS football season. The team was led by tenth-year head coach Mike Leach during the regular season and, following Leach’s dismissal, interim head coach Ruffin McNeill for the bowl game. The Red Raiders compiled an overall record of 9–4 with a mrk of 5–3 in conference play, tying for third place in the Big 12's South Division. Texas Tech was invited to the Alamo Bowl, where they defeated Michigan State, 41–31. The Red Raiders played home games at Jones AT&T Stadium in Lubbock, Texas.

On December 28, Leach was suspended by Texas Tech pending investigation of alleged inappropriate treatment of Adam James, a redshirt sophomore wide receiver, and the son of former SMU Mustangs and New England Patriots running back Craig James. The suspension came after allegations that Leach treated James unfairly following a mild concussion. Leach was terminated by the university on December 30. Ruffin McNeill, the team's defensive coordinator, was named interim head coach and led the team during their appearance in the Alamo Bowl.

== Previous season ==
With an 11–1 record in the regular season during 2008, the Red Raiders finished in a three-way tie with the Oklahoma Sooners and Texas Longhorns atop the Big 12 South. In order to break the tie, BCS standings were used to determine who would face Missouri in the conference championship game. The Sooners, ranked #2 in the BCS polls at the time, were chosen to represent the South Division in the game. The Red Raiders were selected to the Cotton Bowl Classic, losing 34–47 to Ole Miss. The 2008 team finished with an overall record of 11–2 and were ranked no. 12 in the final AP Poll.

== Personnel ==
=== Coaching staff ===
- Mike Leach – Head coach/offensive coordinator
- Ruffin McNeill – Assistant head coach/defensive coordinator
- Carlos Mainord – Safeties
- Clay McGuire – Running backs
- Brian Mitchell – Cornerbacks
- Matt Moore – Offensive line
- Lincoln Riley – Inside receivers
- Eric Russell – Special teams Coordinator
- Charlie Sadler – Defensive ends
- Dennis Simmons – Wide receivers
- Sonny Cumbie – Offensive graduate assistant

=== Roster ===
2009 Texas Tech Red Raiders Football Roster
Centers: 51 Shawn Byrnes – Senior; 73 Justin Keown – Junior; Cornerback: 10 Eugene Neboh – (redshirt) Freshman; Defensive backs: 3 Jamar Wall – Senior; 9 Yashua Williams – Freshman; 11 Aaron Charbonnet – Freshman; 12 D.J. Johnson – Freshman; 21 De’Shon Sanders – Senior; 22 Jared Flannel – Sophomore; 24 Andre McCorkle – Sophomore; 25 Trent Nickerson – Junior; 28 LaRon Moore – Junior; 29 Taylor Charbonnet – Sophomore; 31 Jarrell Routt – Junior; 33 Brent Nickerson – Senior; 36 Jarvis Phillips – Freshman; 37 Angelo Traylor – Sophomore; 38 Arlan Waller – (redshirt) Freshman; 40 Nathan Stone – Junior; 49 Corey Lee – (redshirt) Freshman; 98 Travis Malone – (redshirt) Freshman; Defensive ends: 46 Sandy Riley – Senior; 47 Brandon Sesay – Senior; 48 Ryan Haliburton – (redshirt) Freshman; 53 Daniel Howard – Senior; 75 Christopher Knighton – Freshman; 82 Kerry Hyder – Freshman; 87 Aundrey Barr – Freshman; 92 Brandon Sharpe – Senior; Defensive linemen: 6 Colby Whitlock – Junior; 50 Romario Cathey – Freshman; 80 Jake Myatt – Senior; 94 Chris Perry – Sophomore; Deep safeties: 50 Austin Burns – Senior; 61 Jesse Smitherman – Junior	Defensive tackles: 4 Victor Hunter – Senior; 42 Clint Stoffels – Junior; 47 Myles Wade – Junior; 91 Rajon Henley – Senior; 95 Pearlie Graves – Freshman; 97 Britton Barbee – Junior; 99 Richard Jones – Senior; Inside receivers: 2 Cornelius Douglas – (redshirt) Freshman; 6 Austin Zouzalik – (redshirt) Freshman; 11 Tramain Swindall – Sophomore; 14 Brian Cote – Sophomore; 17 Detron Lewis – Junior; 80 Adrian Reese – Junior; 82 Adam James – Sophomore; 83 Blake Kelley – Junior; Linebackers: 18 Tanner Foster – Sophomore; 19 Brandon Mahoney – Freshman; 20 Bront Bird – Junior; 23 Dion Chidozie – Freshman; 32 Jason Wallace – Sophomore; 35 Blake Collier – Junior; 39 Marlon Williams – Senior; 41 Sam Fehoko – Sophomore; 45 Tyrone Sonier – Sophomore; 47 Bonner Morren – (redshirt) Freshman; 54 Riley Harvey – Sophomore; 56 Jonathan Brydon – Junior; 57 Brian Duncan – Junior; 58 Chris Wallace – Senior; 62 Caleb Schneider – (redshirt) Freshman; 96 Michael Aguilar – Junior; Offensive linemen: 59 Joe King – (redshirt) Freshman; 60 Jonathan Guerra – (redshirt) Freshman; 63 Joel Gray – Freshman; 65 LaAdrian Waddle – Freshman; 66 Deveric Gallington – (redshirt) Freshman; 67 Marlon Winn – Senior; 68 Terry McDaniel – (redshirt) Freshman; 70 Chris Olson – Junior; 71 Kyle Clark – Freshman; 72 Matt Goetz – Freshman; 75 Blake Emert – Sophomore; 76 Brandon Carter – Senior; 77 Mickey Okafor – Sophomore; 78 Lonnie Edwards – Sophomore; 79 David Neill – Sophomore	Punters: 9 Jonathan LaCour – Junior; 38 Ryan Erlexben – Freshman; Place kickers: 49 Donnie Carona – Sophomore; 84 Bradley Hicks – Junior; 85 Matt Williams – Junior; Quarterbacks: 1 Steven Sheffield – Junior; 3 Garrett Riley – Freshman; 7 Seth Doege – (redshirt) Freshman; 8 Jacob Karam – Freshman; 15 Taylor Potts – Junior; 16 Dustin Eskew – Freshman; Running backs: 5 Ryan Hale – Senior; 10 Harrison Jeffers – (redshirt) Freshman; 25 Baron Batch – Junior; 30 Eric Stephens – Freshman; 32 Aaron Crawford – Sophomore; 34 Josh Talbott – (redshirt) Freshman; 36 Gerardo Acevedo – Junior; Safeties: 1 Terrence Bullitt – Freshman; 13 Julius Howard – Junior; 14 Will Ford – Freshman; 16 Cody Davis – (redshirt) Freshman; 24 Daniel Cobb – Freshman; 26 Franklin Mitchem – Junior; 30 Brett Dewhurst – Sophomore; Tight end: 89 Omar Castillo – (redshirt) Freshman; Wide receivers: 8 Jacoby Franks – Sophomore; 12 Derrick Mays – Freshman; 13 E.J. Celestie – Freshman; 14 Landon Hoefer – Senior; 18 Eric Ward – Freshman; 19 Lyle Leong – Junior; 20 Garrick McCray – Sophomore; 23 Rashad Hawk – Sophomore; 24 Weston Neiman – Junior; 27 Edward Britton – Senior; 28 Steven Johnson – (redshirt) Freshman; 86 Alexander Torres – Junior; 87 Aaron Fisher – Freshman; 88 Brik Brinker – Junior
Sources: 2009 Texas Tech Red Raider Football Media Guide

== Schedule ==
Date	Time	Opponent	Rank	Site	TV	Result	Attendance	Source
September 5	6:00 pm	North Dakota*		Jones AT&T Stadium; Lubbock, TX		W 38–13	47,824	
September 12	6:00 pm	Rice*		Jones AT&T Stadium; Lubbock, TX		W 55–10	48,124	
September 19	7:00 pm	at No. 2 Texas		Darrell K Royal–Texas Memorial Stadium; Austin, TX (rivalry, College GameDay)	ABC	L 24–34	101,297	
September 26	8:15 pm	at No. 17 Houston*		Robertson Stadium; Houston, TX (rivalry)	ESPN2	L 28–29	32,114	
October 3	2:30 pm	New Mexico*		Jones AT&T Stadium; Lubbock, TX	FSN	W 48–28	52,909	
October 10	6:00 pm	Kansas State^{†}		Jones AT&T Stadium; Lubbock, TX	FSN	W 66–14	47,382	
October 17	2:30 pm	at No. 15 Nebraska		Memorial Stadium; Lincoln, NE	ABC/ESPN	W 31–10	86,107	
October 24	6:00 pm	Texas A&M	No. 21	Jones AT&T Stadium; Lubbock, TX (rivalry)		L 30–52	57,733	
October 31	2:30 pm	Kansas		Jones AT&T Stadium; Lubbock, TX	ABC	W 42–21	47,291	
November 14	7:00 pm	at No. 17 Oklahoma State		Boone Pickens Stadium; Stillwater, OK	ABC	L 17–24	52,811	
November 21	11:30 am	Oklahoma		Jones AT&T Stadium; Lubbock, TX	FSN	W 41–13	50,479	
November 28	5:00 pm	vs. Baylor		Cowboys Stadium; Arlington, TX (rivalry)	FSN	W 20–13	71,964	
January 2	8:00 pm	vs. Michigan State*		Alamodome; San Antonio, TX (Alamo Bowl)	ESPN	W 41–31	64,757	
*Non-conference game; ^{†}Homecoming; Rankings from AP Poll released prior to the game; All times are in Central time

== Game summaries ==
=== North Dakota ===
North Dakota Fighting Sioux at Texas Tech Red Raiders – Game summary

Quarter	1	2	3	4	Total
Fighting Sioux	3	3	0	7	13
Red Raiders	14	7	7	10	38

at Jones AT&T Stadium, Lubbock, Texas

- Date: September 5
- Game time: 6:00 p.m.
- Game weather: Temperature: 77 °F (25 °C) • Weather: Partly cloudy • Wind: S 10 MPH
- Game attendance: 47,824
- Referee: Roger Gaskamp
- Box score, Recap

Game information

First quarter

- TTU – Baron Batch 3-yard run (Matt Williams kick), 11:42. Red Raiders 7–0. Drive: 7 plays, 64 yards, 3:18.
- TTU – Taylor Potts 1-yard run (Matt Williams kick), 6:06. Red Raiders 14–0. Drive: 10 plays, 54 yards, 3:23.
- UND – Brandon Hellevang 39-yard field goal, 0:06. Red Raiders 14–3. Drive: 10 plays, 69 yards, 6:00.

Second quarter

- TTU – Detron Lewis 49-yard pass from Taylor Potts (Matt Williams kick), 8:41. Red Raiders 21–3. Drive: 6 plays, 74 yards, 2:58.
- UND – Brandon Hellevang 52-yard field goal, 1:28. Red Raiders 21–6. Drive: 12 plays, 45 yards, 7:13.

Third quarter

- TTU – Taylor Potts 1-yard run (Matt Williams kick), 3:21. Red Raiders 28–6. Drive: 9 plays, 42 yards, 4:25.

Fourth quarter

- UND – Mitch Sutton 9-yard run (Brandon Hellevang kick), 11:51. Red Raiders 28–13. Drive: 13 plays, 80 yards, 6:21.
- TTU – Matt Williams 32-yard field goal, 4:49. Red Raiders 31–13. Drive: 10 plays, 55 yards, 4:03.
- TTU – Adam James 18-yard pass from Taylor Potts (Matt Williams kick), 2:05. Red Raiders 38–13. Drive: 4 plays, 42 yards, 1:06.

Top passers

- UND – Jake Landry – 20/28, 134 yards
- TTU – Taylor Potts – 34/48, 405 yards, 2 TD, 3 INT

Top rushers

- UND – Mitch Sutton – 11 rushes, 32 yards, TD
- TTU – Baron Batch – 9 rushes, 30 yards, TD

Top receivers

- UND – Ryan Konrath – 4 receptions, 32 yards
- TTU – Detron Lewis – 8 receptions, 146 yards, TD

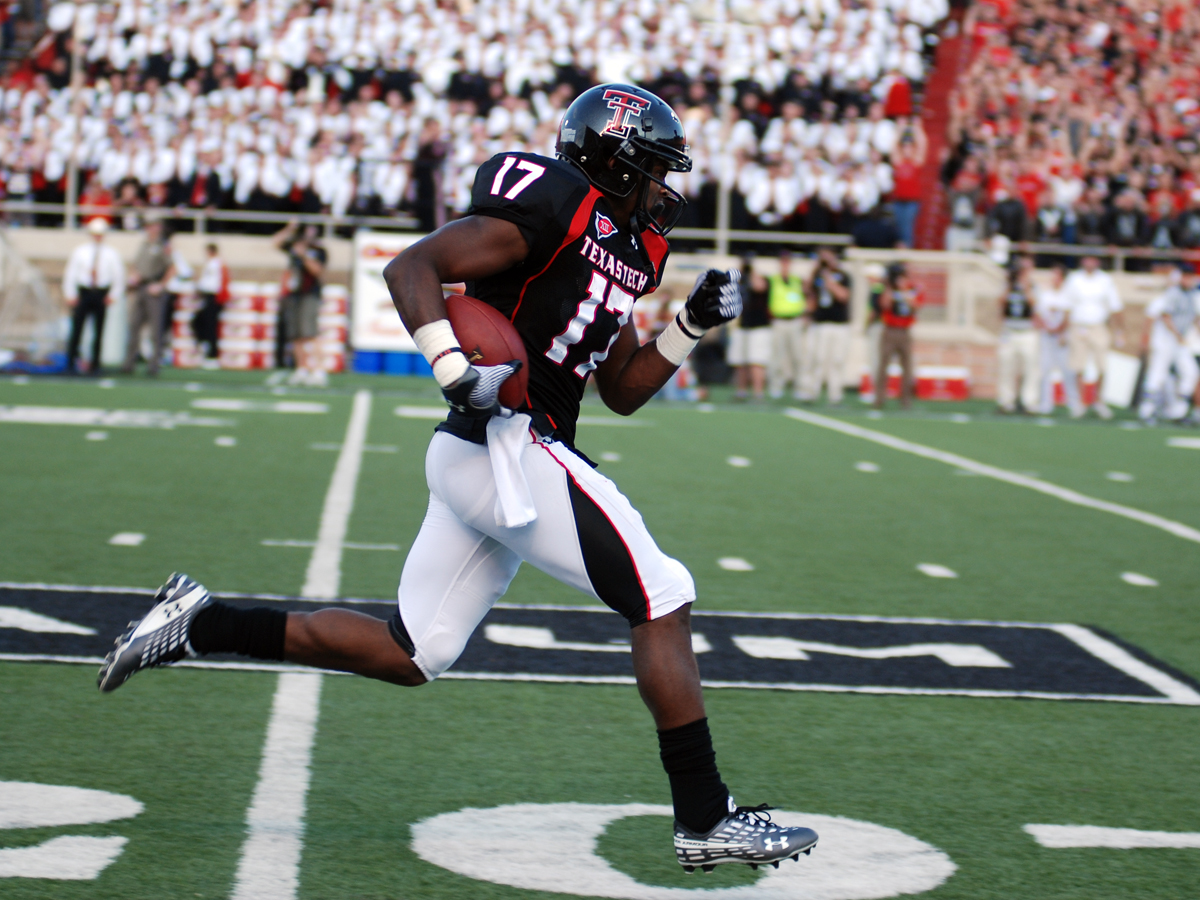
Detron Lewis running for a 49-yard touchdown during the North Dakota game

This game marked the first time the North Dakota Fight Sioux faced the Red Raiders on the football field making North Dakota the 127th different opponent the Red Raiders have faced. The Red Raiders won the coin toss and elected to receive the opening kick off.

The opening drive ultimately ended in a touchdown and covered 64 yards in 7 plays, lasting 3:18. Barron Batch rushed three yards for the first touchdown and was followed by a successful extra point attempt by Matt Williams. The Red Raiders would go on to score one more touchdown with successful PAT in the first quarter. The Fighting Sioux scored a field goal with six seconds left in the first quarter bringing the final score for the first quarter to 14–3.

The second quarter saw the longest touchdown reception of the game with a 49-yard pass by Taylor Potts to Detron Lewis, followed by a successful PAT by Matt Williams. The Fighting Sioux went on to kick a 52-yard field goal with 1:28 left in the half. The final score at the half was 21–6.

The third quarter saw only one score with the Red Raider's quarterback Taylor Potts rushing 1 yard for a touchdown followed by a successful PAT. At the end of the third quarter the score was 28–6.

The Fighting Sioux scored their only touchdown and successful PAT 3:09 into the final quarter. The Red Raiders scored twice in the fourth quarter with a 32-yard field goal by Matt Williams and later an 18-yard touchdown pass by Taylor Potts to Adam Jones. Matt Williams successfully kicked the last PAT of the game bringing the score to 38–13.

During the game, the Red Raiders rushed for 40 yards. Taylor Potts attempted 48 passes, completing 34 for a total of 405 passing yards. Potts was also intercepted 3 times and scored 2 touchdowns. The team accrued 11 penalties for 93 yards.

=== Rice ===
Rice Owls at Texas Tech Red Raiders – Game summary

Quarter	1	2	3	4	Total
Owls	0	3	0	7	10
Red Raiders	14	0	21	20	55

at Jones AT&T Stadium, Lubbock, Texas

- Date: September 12
- Game time: 6:00 p.m.
- Game weather: Temperature: 72 °F (22 °C) • Weather: Cloudy • Wind: NE 15 MPH
- Game attendance: 48,124
- Referee: Ed Ardito
- Box score, Recap

Game information

First quarter

- TTU – Edward Britton 5-yard pass from Taylor Potts (Matt Williams kick), 7:47. Red Raiders 7–0. Drive: 6 plays, 52 yards, 2:00.
- TTU – Lyle Leong 7-yard pass from Taylor Potts (Matt Williams kick), 1:18. Red Raiders 14–0. Drive: 10 plays, 57 yards, 4:24.

Second quarter

- RICE – Clar Fangmeier 45-yard field goal, 10:27. Red Raiders 14–3. Drive: 12 plays, 50 yards, 5:51.

Third quarter

- TTU – Lyle Leong 8-yard pass from Taylor Potts (Matt Williams kick), 8:51. Red Raiders 21–3. Drive: 9 plays, 53 yards, 2:33.
- TTU – Austin Zouzalik 11-yard pass from Taylor Potts (Matt Williams kick), 6:34. Red Raiders 28–3. Drive: 4 plays, 24 yards, 1:33.
- TTU – Lyle Leong 27-yard pass from Taylor Potts (Matt Williams kick), 2:34. Red Raiders 35–3. Drive: 4 plays, 33 yards, 1:26.

Fourth quarter

- TTU – Eric Stephens 34-yard pass from Taylor Potts (kick failed), 14:51. Red Raiders 41–3. Drive: 4 plays, 48 yards, 0:47.
- RICE – Taylor Dupree 3-yard pass from John Thomas Shepherd (Clar Fangmeier kick), 11:02. Red Raiders 41–10. Drive: 8 plays, 65 yards, 3:49.
- TTU – Tramain Swindall 30-yard pass from Taylor Potts (Matt Williams kick), 9:10. Red Raiders 48–10. Drive: 6 plays, 54 yards, 1:52.
- TTU – Tramain Swindall 26-yard pass from Steven Sheffield (Matt Williams kick), 4:33. Red Raiders 55–10. Drive: 8 plays, 60 yards, 3:15.

Top passers

- RICE – John Thomas Shepherd – 14/19, 109 yards, TD
- TTU – Taylor Potts – 36/57, 456 yards, 7 TD

Top rushers

- RICE – Tyler Smith – 16 rushes, 49 yards
- TTU – Harrison Jeffers – 5 rushes, 23 yards

Top receivers

- RICE – Patrick Randolph – 5 receptions, 50 yards
- TTU – Tramain Swindall – 6 receptions, 123 yards, 2 TD

This game was the first time the Rice Owls played Texas Tech Red Raiders at home since 1995. The Owls won the coin toss and elected to defer until the second half.

The Red Raiders shut the Owls out in the first quarter and scored two touchdowns. The first score came 6:13 into the game by way of a 5-yard touchdown pass from Taylor Potts to Edward Britton. Matt Williams successfully kicked the PAT. The next touchdown for the Red Raiders would come with only 1:18 left in the first quarter, when Taylor Potts threw a 7-yard pass to Lyle Leong. The extra point attempt was good. At the end of the quarter the score was 14–0.

The second quarter saw no scores by the Red Raiders. The Owls scored a field goal 3:33 into the quarter. The score at the half was 14–3.

The third quarter proved to be more fruitful for the Red Raiders, were they once again shut out the Owls. The Red Raiders scored three touchdowns with successful PATs all within the last nine minutes of the quarter. The first came with 8:51 left in quarter when Taylor Potts threw an 8-yard pass to Lyle Leong. The next touchdown came a little over two minutes later with an 11-yard touchdown reception by Austin Zouzalik from Taylor Potts. The last touchdown was scored with 2:34 left in the quarter by Taylor Potts and Lyle Leon when Potts threw a 27-yard pass to Leon. At the end of the quarter the score was 35–3.

Steven Sheffield, the Red Raiders backup quarterback, made his season debut when he came in for Taylor Potts during the final quarter after two touchdowns by the Red Raiders and a field goal by the Owls. The first Red Raider touchdown came only nine seconds into the quarter with a 34-yard touchdown reception by Eric Stephens from Taylor Potts. Matt Williams failed to convert the extra point kick. The Owls scored their only touchdown with 11:02 left on the clock. Taylor Potts last touchdown of the game came by way of a 30-yard pass to Tramain Swindall with 9:10 left in the game. The extra point attempt was good. The Red Raiders final score, and Steven Sheffield's first for the season came with 4:33 left in the game when Sheffield threw a 26-yard pass to Tramain Swindall. The PAT was converted by Matt Williams. The final score for the game was 55–10.

The Texas Tech Red Raiders rushed for 52 yards and passed for 508 yards. Taylor Potts attempted 57 passes, completing 36 for 456 yards. Steven Sheffield completed 4 out of 6 passes for 52 yards. Potts threw seven touchdown passes to Sheffield's one. Neither Potts nor Sheffield threw an interception.

The Owls rushed for 60 yards, passed for 197 yards, and scored 1 touchdown.

=== At Texas ===
Texas Tech Red Raiders at No. 2 Texas Longhorns – Game summary

Quarter	1	2	3	4	Total
Red Raiders	3	0	14	7	24
No. 2 Longhorns	7	3	14	10	34

at Darrell K Royal–Texas Memorial Stadium, Austin, Texas

- Date: September 19
- Game time: 7:00 p.m.
- Game weather: Temperature: 86 °F (30 °C) • Weather: Cloudy, 49% humidity • Wind 3 MPH
- Game attendance: 101,297
- Referee: Tom Walker
- TV announcers (ABC): Brent Musburger, Kirk Herbstreit, Lisa Salters
- Box score, Recap

Game information

First quarter

- TTU – Matt Williams 41-yard field goal, 11:06. Red Raiders 3–0. Drive: 10 plays, 56 yards, 3:54.
- TEX – Jordan Shipley 46-yard punt return (Hunter Lawrence kick), 7:02. Longhorns 7–3.

Second quarter

- TEX – Hunter Lawrence 43-yard field goal, 14:51. Longhorns 10–3. Drive: 5 plays, 33 yards, 1:09.

Third quarter

- TEX – Tre' Newton 19-yard run (Hunter Lawrence kick), 11:22. Longhorns 17–3. Drive: 11 plays, 66 yards, 3:30.
- TTU – Lyle Leong 14-yard pass from Taylor Potts (Matt Williams kick), 6:27. Longhorns 17–10. Drive: 11 plays, 61 yards, 4:48.
- TEX – Cody Johnson 1-yard run (Hunter Lawrence kick), 4:20. Longhorns 24–10. Drive: 6 plays, 47 yards, 2:05.
- TTU – Lyle Leong 10-yard pass from Taylor Potts (Matt Williams kick), 1:35. Longhorns 24–17. Drive: 8 plays, 84 yards, 2:40.

Fourth quarter

- TEX – Dan Buckner 3-yard pass from Colt McCoy (Hunter Lawrence kick), 9:11. Longhorns 31–17. Drive: 6 plays, 19 yards, 2:38.
- TTU – Tramain Swindall 22-yard pass from Taylor Potts (Matt Williams kick), 6:48. Longhorns 31–24. Drive: 8 plays, 88 yards, 2:06.
- TEX – Hunter Lawrence 33-yard field goal, 3:49. Longhorns 34–24. Drive: 9 plays, 49 yards, 3:02.

Top passers

- TTU – Taylor Potts – 46/62, 420 yards, 3 TD, INT
- TEX – Colt McCoy – 24/34, 205 yards, TD, 2 INT

Top rushers

- TTU – Eric Stephens – 9 rushes, 27 yards
- TEX – Tre' Newton – 20 rushes, 88 yards, TD

Top receivers

- TTU – Lyle Leong – 6 receptions, 80 yards, 2 TD
- TEX – Dan Buckner – 6 receptions, 75 yards, TD

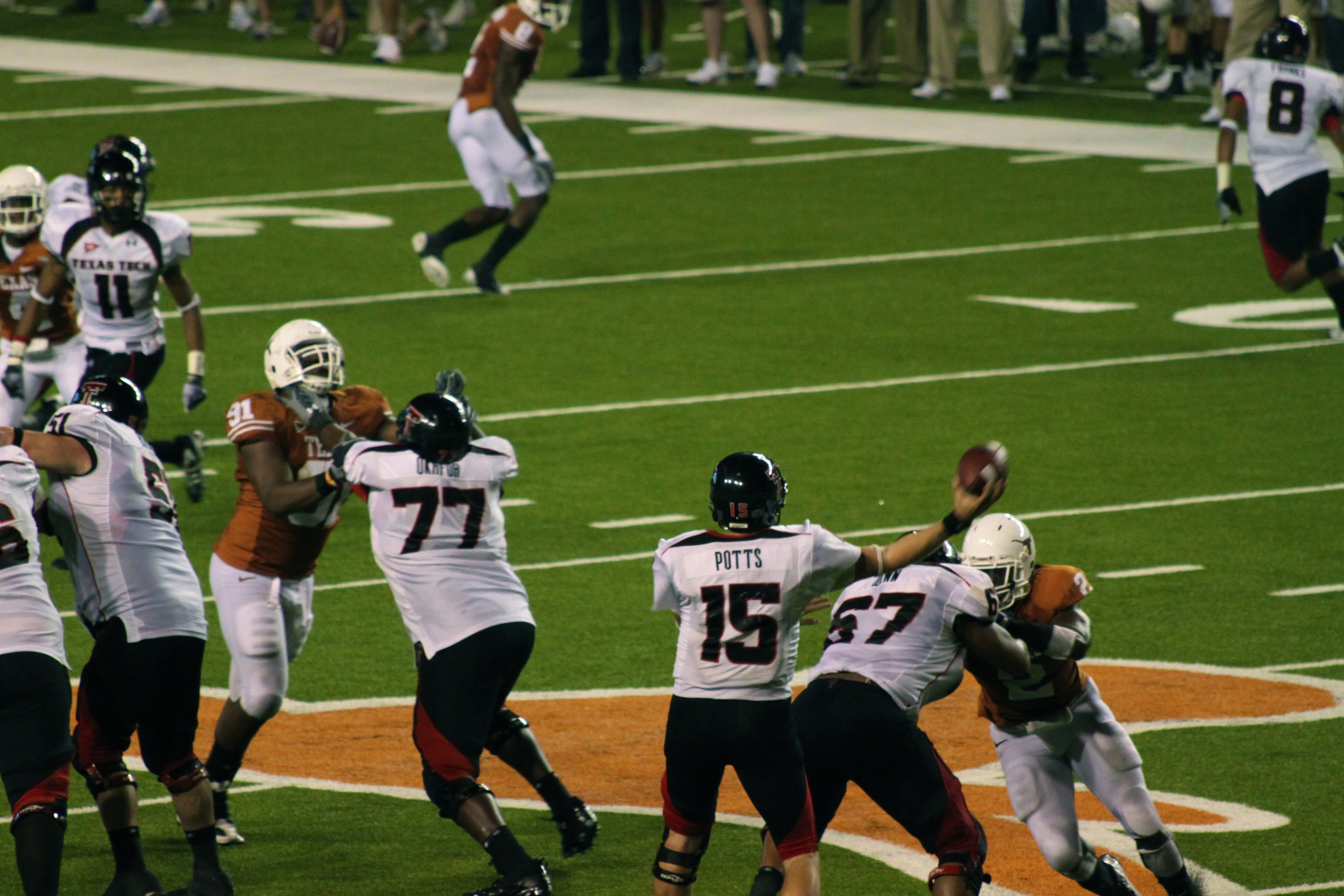
Taylor Potts making a pass during the Texas game

The Texas Tech Red Raiders competed against the Texas Longhorns at Darrell K Royal-Texas Memorial Stadium on September 9, 2009. For the second year in a row the matchup was highlighted on ESPN's GameDay.

The series between Texas Tech and Texas originated in Austin in 1928 and the two teams have met annually since 1960. Before the game, Texas led the series 43–15–0. The Red Raider's victory in the 2008 season was only the second time in the last 10 meetings.

The Texas Tech Red Raiders received the opening kick off and returned it 28 yards. The Red Raiders opening driving ended with a 41-yard field goal by Matt Williams. On their second drive the Longhorns scored by returning a Red Raider punt 46 yards for a touchdown. The score at the end of the first quarter was 3–7.

The Red Raiders did not score in the second quarter, and would hold the Longhorns to only a field goal. At the half the score was 3–10.

The third quarter saw two touchdowns by both the Red Raiders and the Longhorns. The Longhorns scored a touchdown and successful PAT, on their opening drive of the second half. On the next possession the Red Raiders answered the Longhorns score with a touchdown and successful PAT of their own. The Red Raiders first touchdown of the game came by way of a 14-yard pass to Lyle Leong by Taylor Potts and the PAT was kicked by Matt Williams. After an unsuccessful on-side kick by the Red Raiders, Texas's next drive would end with a touchdown and PAT. The Red Raiders next drive proved as fruitful as their previous ending with a 10-yard touchdown pass by Potts to Leong. The final score at the end of the quarter was 17–24.

The Red Raider's first two possessions of the fourth quarters ended in a turnovers. The second of which resulted in a Longhorn touchdown, their last of the game. The Red Raiders last score came on their next possession by way of a 22-yard touchdown reception by Tramain Swindall from Taylor Potts. The Longhorns would score the final points of the game with a field goal. The final score of the game was 24–34.

The Longhorns rushed for 135 yards and the Longhorns' Colt McCoy attempted 34 passes completing 24 for 205 yards and was intercepted twice. The Red Raiders rushed for -6 yards and fumbled the ball once. Taylor Potts completed 46 passes out of an attempted 62 for a total of 420 yards. Potts was intercepted once.

=== At Houston ===
Texas Tech Red Raiders at No. 17 Houston Cougars – Game summary

Quarter	1	2	3	4	Total
Red Raiders	7	14	7	0	28
No. 17 Cougars	7	6	10	6	29

at Robertson Stadium, Houston, Texas

- Date: September 26
- Game time: 8:15 p.m.
- Game weather: Temperature: 86 °F (30 °C) • Weather: Mostly cloudy • Wind: NNW 5 MPH
- Game attendance: 32,114
- Referee: Scott Novak
- TV announcers (ESPN2): Mike Patrick, Craig James, Heather Cox
- Box score, Recap

Game information

First quarter

- HOU – James Cleveland 6-yard pass from Case Keenum (Jordan Mannisto kick), 10:43. Cougars 7–0. Drive: 8 plays, 34 yards, 3:13.
- TTU – Baron Batch 6-yard run (Matt Williams kick), 6:59. Tied 7–7. Drive: 9 plays, 75 yards, 3:44.

Second quarter

- HOU – James Mannisto 30-yard field goal, 8:52. Cougars 10–7. Drive: 10 plays, 69 yards, 4:15.
- TTU – Baron Batch 11-yard run (Matt Williams kick), 5:59. Red Raiders 14–10. Drive: 7 plays, 85 yards, 2:53.
- TTU – Harrison Jeffers 13-yard run (Matt Williams kick), 0:59. Red Raiders 21–10. Drive: 8 plays, 59 yards, 2:51.
- HOU – Jordan Mannisto 50-yard field goal, 0:00. Red Raiders 21–13. Drive: 5 plays, 28 yards, 0:59.

Third quarter

- HOU – Bryce Beall 1-yard run (Jordan Mannisto kick), 7:13. Red Raiders 21–20. Drive: 7 plays, 87 yards, 2:23.
- TTU – Tramain Swindall 24-yard pass from Taylor Potts (Matt Williams kick), 4:19. Red Raiders 28–20. Drive: 8 plays, 75 yards, 2:54.
- HOU – Jordan Mannisto 21-yard field goal, 0:12. Red Raiders 28–23. Drive: 11 plays, 65 yards, 2:26.

Fourth quarter

- HOU – Case Keenum 4-yard run (pass failed), 0:49. Cougars 29–28. Drive: 16 plays, 95 yards, 4:58.

Top passers

- TTU – Taylor Potts – 30/45, 321 yards, TD
- HOU – Case Keenum – 38/58, 435 yards, TD, INT

Top rushers

- TTU – Baron Batch – 19 rushes, 114 yards, 2 TD
- HOU – Bryce Beall – 19 rushes, 75 yards, TD

Top receivers

- TTU – Alex Torres – 6 receptions, 90 yards
- HOU – Charles Sims – 10 receptions, 122 yards

The Texas Tech Red Raiders faced the Houston Cougars at Robertson Stadium in Houston Texas on September 26. This non-conference game was the 28th time the two teams meet, however this was the first time the Red Raiders have played at Robertson Stadium. The Red Raiders ultimately lost the game with a final score of 28–29, dropping their record to 2–2.

=== New Mexico ===
New Mexico Lobos at Texas Tech Red Raiders – Game summary

Quarter	1	2	3	4	Total
Lobos	0	7	0	21	28
Red Raiders	7	7	21	13	48

at Jones AT&T Stadium, Lubbock, Texas

- Date: October 3
- Game time: 2:30 p.m.
- Game attendance: 52,909
- Referee: Bill Athan
- TV announcers (FSN): Bill Land, Gary Reasons, Emily Jones
- Box score, Recap

Game information

First quarter

- HOU – Harrison Jeffers 1-yard run (Matt Williams kick), 14:22. Red Raiders 7–0. Drive: 2 plays, 80 yards, 0:38.

Second quarter

- UNM – Josh Fussell 7-yard pass from Donovan Porterie (James Aho kick), 12:05. Tied 7–7. Drive: 7 plays, 56 yards, 3:04.
- TTU – Alex Torres 25-yard pass from Steven Sheffield (Matt Williams kick), 0:00. Red Raiders 14–7. Drive: 5 plays, 86 yards, 0:56.

Third quarter

- TTU – Baron Batch 5-yard run (Matt Williams kick), 9:53. Red Raiders 21–7. Drive: 7 plays, 34 yards, 3:35.
- TTU – Detron Lewis 20-yard pass from Steven Sheffield (Matt Williams kick), 5:23. Red Raiders 28–7. Drive: 7 plays, 57 yards, 3:11.
- TTU – Harrison Jeffers 62-yard pass from Steven Sheffield (Matt Williams kick), 1:28. Red Raiders 35–7. Drive: 2 plays, 71 yards, 0:42.

Fourth quarter

- UNM – Franki Solomon 29-yard interception return (James Aho kick), 11:55. Red Raiders 35–14.
- UNM – A. J. Butler 1-yard run (James Aho kick), 3:36. Red Raiders 35–21. Drive: 16 plays, 95 yards, 5:10.
- TTU – Harrison Jeffers 2-yard run (Matt Williams kick), 1:28. Red Raiders 42–21. Drive: 5 plays, 38 yards, 2:08.
- UNM – Bryant Williams 61-yard pass from Donovan Porterie (James Aho kick), 0:46. Red Raiders 42–28. Drive: 2 plays, 69 yards, 0:42.
- TTU – Harrison Jeffers 2-yard run (run failed), 0:00. Red Raiders 48–28. Drive: 2 plays, 1 yard, 0:46.

Top passers

- UNM – Donovan Porterie – 30/56, 316 yards, 2 TD
- TTU – Steven Sheffield – 16/23, 238 yards, 3 TD, INT

Top rushers

- UNM – A. J. Butler – 26 rushes, 102 yards, TD
- TTU – Baron Batch – 8 rushes, 47 yards, TD

Top receivers

- UNM – Bryant Williams – 2 receptions, 75 yards, TD
- TTU – Tramain Swindall – 5 receptions, 139 yards

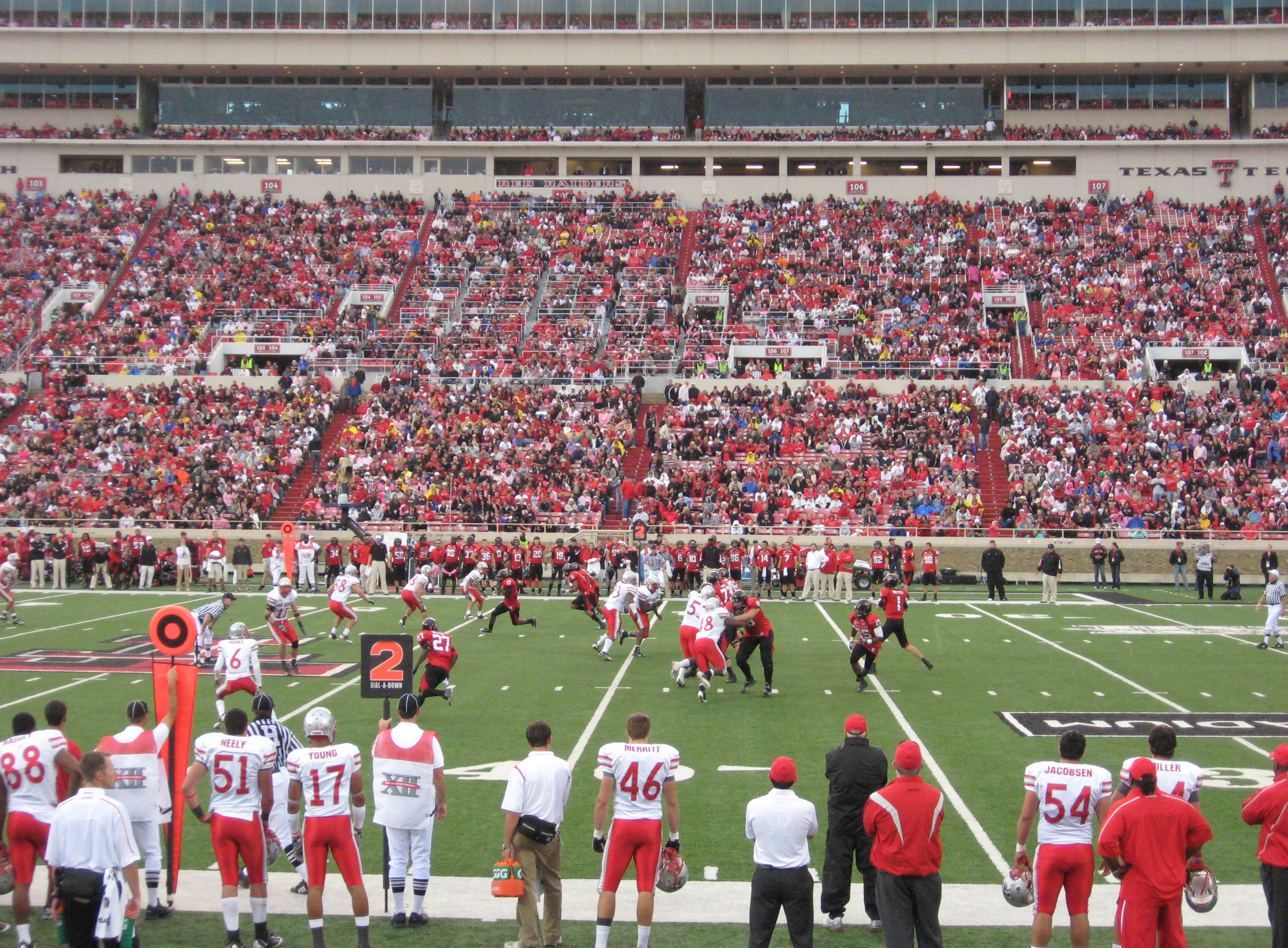
Action during the New Mexico game

The Red Raiders competed against the New Mexico Lobos at Jones AT&T Stadium in Lubbock, Texas, on October 3, 2009. Going into the game, the Red Raiders led the series with a record of 32–6–2. This was the first meeting of the two teams since 2004. The Red Raiders beat the Lobos with a final score of 48–28. Taylor Potts led the Raiders to a score on their first possession of the game, but he left the game with an injury in the second quarter, and Steven Sheffield came in late in the second quarter. Sheffield's 25-yard touchdown pass to Alexander Torres gave the Raiders a 14-7 halftime lead. Sheffield threw two third-quarter touchdown passes, including a 62-yard catch and run by Harrison Jeffers, as the Raiders extended their lead to 35-7. Jeffers added two more touchdown runs in the fourth quarter to finish the scoring in Tech's 48-28 win.

=== Kansas State ===
Kansas State Wildcats at Texas Tech Red Raiders – Game summary

Quarter	1	2	3	4	Total
Wildcats	0	0	7	7	14
Red Raiders	14	24	14	14	66

at Jones AT&T Stadium, Lubbock, Texas

- Date: October 10
- Game time: 6:00 p.m.
- Game weather: Temperature: 48 °F (9 °C) • Weather: Cloudy • Wind: E 12 MPH
- Game attendance: 47,382
- Referee: Adrian Hill
- TV announcers (FSN): Bill Land, Gary Reasons, Emily Jones
- Box score, Recap

Game information

First quarter

- TTU – Tramain Swindall 52-yard pass from Steven Sheffield (Matt Williams kick), 11:31. Red Raiders 7–0. Drive: 7 plays, 71 yards, 3:29.
- TTU – Alex Torres 6-yard pass from Steven Sheffield (Matt Williams kick), 1:49. Red Raiders 14–0. Drive: 8 plays, 90 yards, 3:17.

Second quarter

- TTU – Matt Williams 20-yard field goal, 11:28. Red Raiders 17–0. Drive: 9 plays, 53 yards, 3:35.
- TTU – Detron Lewis 4-yard pass from Steven Sheffield (Matt Williams kick), 6:49. Red Raiders 24–0. Drive: 7 plays, 49 yards, 3:08.
- TTU – Jacoby Franks 72-yard pass from Steven Sheffield (Matt Williams kick), 3:59. Red Raiders 31–0. Drive: 2 plays, 77 yards, 0:42.
- TTU – Alex Torres 28-yard pass from Steven Sheffield (Matt Williams kick), 0:29. Red Raiders 38–0. Drive: 5 plays, 67 yards, 1:04.

Third quarter

- KSU – Jeff Fitzgerald 17-yard interception return (Josh Cherry kick), 12:54. Red Raiders 38–7.
- TTU – Baron Batch 4-yard run (Matt Williams kick), 7:59. Red Raiders 45–7. Drive: 10 plays, 85 yards, 4:55.
- TTU – Detron Lewis 12-yard pass from Steven Sheffield (Matt Williams kick), 3:52. Red Raiders 52–7. Drive: 5 plays, 54 yards, 2:27.

Fourth quarter

- TTU – Lyle Leong 25-yard pass from Steven Sheffield (Matt Williams kick), 12:34. Red Raiders 59–7. Drive: 8 plays, 95 yards, 2:54.
- KSU – Keithen Valentine 8-yard run (Josh Cherry kick), 7:33. Red Raiders 59–14. Drive: 3 plays, 75 yards, 1:08.
- TTU – Brik Brinker 7-yard pass from Seth Doege (Matt Williams kick), 4:09. Red Raiders 66–14. Drive: 9 plays, 80 yards, 3:24.

Top passers

- KSU – Carson Coffman – 11/16, 131 yards
- TTU – Steven Sheffield – 33/41, 490 yards, 7 TD, INT

Top rushers

- KSU – Keithen Valentine – 8 rushes, 96 yards, TD
- TTU – Baron Batch – 9 rushes, 86 yards, TD

Top receivers

- KSU – Attrail Snipes – 7 receptions, 82 yards
- TTU – Detron Lewis – 8 receptions, 100 yards, 2 TD

The Red Raiders took on the Kansas State Wildcats at Jones AT&T Stadium in Lubbock, Texas, on October 10, 2009. This homecoming game was the 11th meeting of the two teams. The Red Raiders had won the previous four games against the Wildcats and had a record of 5–1 at home against the team prior to this game. The game was regionally televised on FSN. The Red Raiders beat the Wildcats with a final score of 66–14. Tech's 66 points were the most ever scored on a team coached by Bill Snyder.

=== At Nebraska ===
Texas Tech Red Raiders at No. 15 Nebraska Cornhuskers – Game summary

Quarter	1	2	3	4	Total
Red Raiders	14	10	0	7	31
No. 15 Cornhuskers	0	3	0	7	10

at Memorial Stadium, Lincoln, Nebraska

- Date: October 17
- Game time: 2:30 p.m.
- Game weather: Temperature: 46 °F (8 °C) • Weather: Partly sunny • Wind: S 1 MPH
- Game attendance: 86,107
- Referee: C. Castleberry
- TV announcers (ABC/ESPN): Mike Patrick (play-by-play), Craig James (analyst), and Heather Cox (sideline)
- Box score, Recap

Game information

First quarter

- TTU – Baron Batch 16-yard pass from Steven Sheffield (Matt Williams kick), 10:21. Red Raiders 7–0. Drive: 9 plays, 80 yards, 4:39.
- TTU – Daniel Howard 82-yard fumble return (Matt Williams kick), 4:54. Red Raiders 14–0.

Second quarter

- TTU – Steven Sheffield 1-yard run (Matt Williams kick), 6:56. Red Raiders 21–0. Drive: 12 plays, 65 yards, 6:40.
- NEB – Alex Henery 21-yard field goal, 1:47. Red Raiders 21–3. Drive: 11 plays, 74 yards, 5:02.
- TTU – Matt Williams 32-yard field goal, 0:03. Red Raiders 24–3. Drive: 5 plays, 67 yards, 1:39.

Third quarter

- No scoring plays

Fourth quarter

- NEB – Khiry Cooper 13-yard pass from Cody Green (Alex Henery kick), 8:40. Red Raiders 24–10. Drive: 7 plays, 40 yards, 1:23.
- TTU – Steven Sheffield 1-yard run (Matt Williams kick), 3:30. Red Raiders 31–10. Drive: 9 plays, 54 yards, 5:00.

Top passers

- TTU – Steven Sheffield – 23/32, 234 yards, TD
- NEB – Zac Lee – 16/22, 128 yards

Top rushers

- TTU – Baron Batch – 12 rushes, 38 yards
- NEB – Roy Helu – 16 rushes, 68 yards

Top receivers

- TTU – Detron Lewis – 5 receptions, 100 yards
- NEB – Chris Brooks – 5 receptions, 66 yards

The Red Raiders took on the No. 15 Nebraska Cornhuskers at the Memorial Stadium in Lincoln, Nebraska on October 17, 2009. Before a crowd of more than 86,000, the Raiders jumped out in front early on a touchdown pass from Sheffield to Baron Batch.

Tech's defense then made the biggest play of the game, with defensive end Daniel Howard picking up a fumbled lateral pass and returning it 82 yards for a touchdown and a 14-0 Red Raider lead. The Raiders were up 24-3 as the defense kept Nebraska's offense in check.

The Red Raider offense was stalled in the second half, but Tech's defense continued to make big plays to keep the Huskers from making a comeback. Defensive end Brandon Sharpe had four of Tech's five sacks, and Sheffield scored on a quarterback sneak to put Tech up by three touchdowns late in the game.

With the win, the Raiders improved to 5-2 and appeared in the AP top 25 for the first and only time during the 2009 regular season at No. 21 in the nation.

=== Texas A&M ===
Texas A&M Aggies at No. 21 Texas Tech Red Raiders – Game summary

Quarter	1	2	3	4	Total
Aggies	7	21	10	14	52
No. 21 Red Raiders	14	0	8	8	30

at Jones AT&T Stadium, Lubbock, Texas

- Date: October 24
- Game time: 6:00 p.m.
- Game weather: Temperature: 77 °F (25 °C) • Weather: Mostly cloudy • Wind: WSW 20 MPH
- Game attendance: 57,733
- Referee: Rick Loumiet
- Box score, Recap

Game information

First quarter

- TTU – Alex Torres 56-yard pass from Taylor Potts (Matt Williams kick), 12:52. Red Raiders 7–0. Drive: 6 plays, 80 yards, 2:08.
- TAMU – Cyrus Gray 12-yard pass from Jerrod Johnson (Randy Bullock kick), 8:19. Tied 7–7. Drive: 9 plays, 86 yards, 2:37.
- TTU – Edward Britton 26-yard pass from Taylor Potts (Matt Williams kick), 0:30. Red Raiders 14–7. Drive: 8 plays, 86 yards, 2:53.

Second quarter

- TAMU – Cyrus Gray 3-yard run (Randy Bullock kick), 13:41. Tied 14–14. Drive: 6 plays, 78 yards, 1:49.
- TAMU – Christine Michael 1-yard run (Randy Bullock kick), 6:50. Aggies 21–14. Drive: 12 plays, 71 yards, 3:34.
- TAMU – Cyrus Gray 1-yard run (Randy Bullock kick), 1:22. Aggies 28–14. Drive: 11 plays, 73 yards, 3:45.

Third quarter

- TAMU – Christine Michael 44-yard run (Randy Bullock kick), 12:56. Aggies 35–14. Drive: 6 plays, 78 yards, 2:04.
- TAMU – Randy Bullock 22-yard field goal, 6:19. Aggies 38–14. Drive: 8 plays, 29 yards, 2:25.
- TTU – Eric Stephens 7-yard run (Taylor Potts pass to Edward Britton), 1:59. Aggies 38–22. Drive: 3 plays, 24 yards, 0:52.

Fourth quarter

- TAMU – Jerrod Johnson 21-yard run (Randy Bullock kick), 8:38. Aggies 45–22. Drive: 8 plays, 46 yards, 3:54.
- TTU – Baron Batch 1-yard run (Taylor Potts pass to Detron Lewis), 5:13. Aggies 45–30. Drive: 11 plays, 67 yards, 3:25.
- TAMU – Cyrus Gray 7-yard run (Randy Bullock kick), 1:08. Aggies 52–30. Drive: 9 plays, 43 yards, 4:05.

Top passers

- TAMU – Jerrod Johnson – 19/28, 238 yards, TD
- TTU – Taylor Potts – 25/36, 310 yards, 2 TD, 2 INT

Top rushers

- TAMU – Cyrus Gray – 25 rushes, 131 yards, 3 TD
- TTU – Baron Batch – 11 rushes, 58 yards, TD

Top receivers

- TAMU – Uzoma Nwachukwu – 4 receptions, 79 yards
- TTU – Alex Torres – 8 receptions, 128 yards, TD

The Red Raiders competed against the Texas A&M Aggies at the Jones AT&T Stadium in Lubbock, Texas on October 24, 2009. Tech scored first on a 56-yard touchdown pass from Taylor Potts to Alexander Torres, and Potts hooked up with Edward Britton for another touchdown to give Tech a 14-7 lead late in the first quarter. The Aggies then went on to score 31 straight points in the second and third quarters to pull away.

Attendance for the game was 57,733. It was the largest crowd at football game at Jones AT&T Stadium, beating the previous record of 56,333, set on November 1, 2008 in the game against Texas.

=== Kansas ===
Kansas Jayhawks at Texas Tech Red Raiders – Game summary

Quarter	1	2	3	4	Total
Jayhawks	7	7	7	0	21
Red Raiders	0	14	0	28	42

at Jones AT&T Stadium, Lubbock, Texas

- Date: October 31
- Game time: 2:30 p.m.
- Game weather: Temperature: 67 °F (19 °C) • Weather: Sunny • Wind: SSW 12 MPH
- Game attendance: 47,291
- Referee: Karl Richins
- TV announcers (ABC): Ron Franklin, Ed Cunningham
- Box score, Recap

Game information

First quarter

- KU – Maxwell Onyegbule 3-yard fumble return (Jacob Branstetter kick), 8:13. Jayhawks 7–0.

Second quarter

- TTU – Detron Lewis 61-yard pass from Seth Doege (Matt Williams kick), 14:22. Tied 7–7. Drive: 3 plays, 63 yards, 0:44.
- TTU – Baron Batch 2-yard run (Matt Williams kick), 3:05. Red Raiders 14–7. Drive: 1 play, 6 yards, 0:10.
- KU – Toben Opurum 2-yard run (Jacob Branstetter kick), 0:47. Tied 14–14. Drive: 1 play, 2 yards, 0:11.

Third quarter

- KU – Dezmon Briscoe 6-yard pass from Todd Reesing (Jacob Branstetter kick), 0:05. Jayhawks 21–14. Drive: 10 plays, 81 yards, 3:59.

Fourth quarter

- TTU – Baron Batch 1-yard run (Matt Williams kick), 11:06. Tied 21–21. Drive: 9 plays, 80 yards, 3:59.
- TTU – Baron Batch 17-yard run (Matt Williams kick), 8:49. Red Raiders 28–21. Drive: 3 plays, 23 yards, 0:41.
- TTU – LaRon Moore 31-yard fumble return (Matt Williams kick), 7:10. Red Raiders 35–21.
- TTU – Baron Batch 11-yard run (Matt Williams kick), 2:05. Red Raiders 42–21. Drive: 2 plays, 19 yards, 0:23.

Top passers

- KU – Todd Reesing – 20/35, 181 yards, TD
- TTU – Seth Doege – 14/28, 159 yards, TD

Top rushers

- KU – Jake Sharp – 10 rushes, 50 yards
- TTU – Baron Batch – 17 rushes, 123 yards, 4 TD

Top receivers

- KU – Dezmon Briscoe – 9 receptions, 110 yards, TD
- TTU – Detron Lewis – 5 receptions, 87 yards, TD

The Red Raiders faced the Kansas Jayhawks at the Jones AT&T Stadium in Lubbock, Texas on October 31, 2009. Redshirt freshman quarterback Seth Doege got his first NCAA start because of injuries to Taylor Potts and Steven Sheffield. The Raiders didn't get on the scoreboard until the second quarter, when Doege hit Detron Lewis on a 61-yard touchdown bomb to tie the game at 7-7. Later in the second quarter, Colby Whitlock sacked Todd Reesing and forced a fumble deep in Kansas territory, which the Raiders recovered. Baron Batch scored on a 2-yard run, and the two teams went into halftime tied 14-14.

The Jayhawks took a 21-14 lead into the fourth quarter, but the Raiders put up four touchdowns to pull away. Batch scored three touchdowns on the ground, and Laron Moore added a score on a fumble recovery.

=== At Oklahoma State ===
Texas Tech Red Raiders at No. 17 Oklahoma State Cowboys – Game summary

Quarter	1	2	3	4	Total
Red Raiders	0	10	0	7	17
No. 17 Cowboys	7	0	3	14	24

at Boone Pickens Stadium, Stillwater, Oklahoma

- Date: November 14
- Game time: 7:00 p.m.
- Game weather: Temperature: 53 °F (12 °C) • Weather: Mostly cloudy • Wind: N 6 MPH
- Game attendance: 52,811
- Referee: Matt Loeffler
- TV announcers (ABC): Mike Patrick, Craig James, Heather Cox
- Box score, Recap

Game information

First quarter

- OKST – Hubert Anyiam 25-yard pass from Zac Robinson (Dan Bailey kick), 0:54. Cowboys 7–0. Drive: 12 plays, 74 yards, 6:59.

Second quarter

- TTU – Matt Williams 34-yard field goal, 9:58. Cowboys 7–3. Drive: 8 plays, 24 yards, 2:38.
- TTU – Alex Torres 12-yard pass from Steven Sheffield (Matt Williams kick), 3:05. Red Raiders 10–7. Drive: 6 plays, 32 yards, 2:17.

Third quarter

- OKST – Dan Bailey 26-yard field goal, 6:52. Tied 10–10. Drive: 19 plays, 73 yards, 8:08.

Fourth quarter

- OKST – Keith Toston 1-yard run (Dan Bailey kick), 12:57. Cowboys 17–10. Drive: 15 plays, 66 yards, 6:03.
- OKST – Patrick Lavine 21-yard interception return (Dan Bailey kick), 8:06. Cowboys 24–10.
- TTU – Edward Britton 24-yard pass from Taylor Potts (Matt Williams kick), 6:59. Cowboys 24–17. Drive: 5 plays, 80 yards, 1:07.

Top passers

- TTU – Taylor Potts – 19/35, 190 yards, TD, INT
- OKST – Zac Robinson – 9/21, 90 yards, TD

Top rushers

- TTU – Baron Batch – 10 rushes, 48 yards
- OKST – Zac Robinson – 19 rushes, 99 yards

Top receivers

- TTU – Detron Lewis – 6 receptions, 75 yards
- OKST – Hubert Anyiam – 3 receptions, 39 yards, TD

=== Oklahoma ===
Oklahoma Sooners at Texas Tech Red Raiders – Game summary

Quarter	1	2	3	4	Total
Sooners	3	3	0	7	13
Red Raiders	3	14	10	14	41

at Jones AT&T Stadium, Lubbock, Texas

- Date: November 21
- Game time: 11:30 a.m.
- Game weather: Temperature: 49 °F (9 °C) • Weather: Clear • Wind: S 9 MPH
- Game attendance: 50,479
- Referee: Adrian Hill
- TV announcers (FSN): Joel Meyers (play-by-play), Dave Lapham, Joel Klatt (analysts), and Jim Knox (sideline)
- Box score, Recap

Game information

First quarter

- TTU – Matt Williams 33-yard field goal, 10:57. Red Raiders 3–0. Drive: 11 plays, 63 yards, 4:03.
- OKLA – Patrick O'Hara 47-yard field goal, 1:24. Tied 3–3. Drive: 7 plays, 42 yards, 2:36.

Second quarter

- OKLA – Patrick O'Hara 22-yard field goal, 10:42. Sooners 6–3. Drive: 14 plays, 51 yards, 4:44.
- TTU – Baron Batch 1-yard run (Matt Williams kick), 8:48. Red Raiders 10–6. Drive: 4 plays, 69 yards, 1:54.
- TTU – Austin Zouzalik 21-yard pass from Taylor Potts (Matt Williams kick), 4:58. Red Raiders 17–6. Drive: 6 plays, 68 yards, 2:10.

Third quarter

- TTU – Alex Torres 24-yard pass from Taylor Potts (Matt Williams kick), 10:38. Red Raiders 24–6. Drive: 6 plays, 91 yards, 2:13.
- TTU – Matt Williams 37-yard field goal, 8:01. Red Raiders 27–6. Drive: 4 plays, -1 yards, 1:25.

Fourth quarter

- TTU – Baron Batch 21-yard run (Matt Williams kick), 13:43. Red Raiders 34–6. Drive: 18 plays, 80 yards, 7:02.
- OKLA – Ryan Broyles 51-yard pass from Landry Jones (Patrick O'Hara kick), 7:30. Red Raiders 34–13. Drive: 5 plays, 63 yards, 1:01.
- TTU – Eric Stephens 4-yard run (Matt Williams kick), 0:47. Red Raiders 41–13. Drive: 14 plays, 82 yards, 6:43.

Top passers

- OKLA – Landry Jones – 18/35, 262 yards, TD, INT
- TTU – Taylor Potts – 35/53, 388 yards, 2 TD, INT

Top rushers

- OKLA – Chris Brown – 11 rushes, 37 yards
- TTU – Baron Batch – 25 rushes, 136 yards, 2 TD

Top receivers

- OKLA – Ryan Broyles – 7 receptions, 117 yards, TD
- TTU – Alex Torres – 11 receptions, 163 yards, TD

Tech came into the home game against Oklahoma seeking revenge for the 65-21 rout that the Raiders suffered in the 2008 match-up against the Sooners. The game saw a low-scoring first quarter, with Tech going up 3-0 on their first possession. Taylor Potts put Tech in position to score with passes to Lyle Leong, Edward Britton and Baron Batch to set up Matt Williams' 33-yard field goal. The game was tied 3-3 after the first quarter, but the Raiders' offense got on track with two second-quarter touchdowns. Batch scored on a 1-yard touchdown run, set up by a 65-yard pass from Potts to Torres. Tech's defense forced a quick OU punt, and Potts then hooked up with Zouzalik on a 21-yard touchdown pass to give the Raiders a 17-6 halftime lead. Tech's defense shut down the Sooners on Oklahoma's opening possession of the second half, and the Raiders quickly marched 91 yards for another touchdown, with Potts hitting Torres on a 24-yard scoring pass for a 24-6 lead. Tech cornerback Laron Moore intercepted an Oklahoma pass on the Sooners' next possession, but the Raiders could not push the ball in for a touchdown, settling for a 37-yard field goal from Williams. On Tech's next possession, the Raiders mounted an 18-play drive that chewed up more than seven minutes before scoring on a 21-yard run by Batch. Oklahoma finally scored their only touchdown on a pass from Landry Jones to Ryan Broyles, but the Raiders added a final touchdown on a 4-yard run by Eric Stephens.

=== Vs. Baylor ===
Texas Tech Red Raiders vs. Baylor Bears – Game summary

Quarter	1	2	3	4	Total
Red Raiders	0	3	14	3	20
Bears	3	7	3	0	13

at Cowboys Stadium, Arlington, Texas

- Date: November 28
- Game time: 5:00 p.m.
- Game weather: Temperature: 67 °F (19 °C) • Weather: Partly cloudy • Wind: SSE 11 MPH
- Game attendance: 71,964
- Referee: Greg Burks
- TV announcers (FSN): Dan McLaughlin, Gary Reasons, Emily Jones
- Box score, Recap

Game information

First quarter

- BAY – Dary Stone 25-yard field goal, 11:11. Bears 3–0. Drive: 8 plays, 75 yards, 3:49.

Second quarter

- BAY – Blake Szymanski 1-yard run (Dary Stone kick), 13:30. Bears 10–0. Drive: 13 plays, 82 yards, 4:11.
- TTU – Matt Williams 18-yard field goal, 0:04. Bears 10–3. Drive: 7 plays, 41 yards, 2:10.

Third quarter

- BAY – Dary Stone 40-yard field goal, 12:42. Bears 13–3. Drive: 7 plays, 4 yards, 1:59.
- TTU – Lyle Leong 6-yard pass from Taylor Potts (Matt Williams kick), 9:48. Bears 13–10. Drive: 6 plays, 36 yards, 2:41.
- TTU – Lyle Leong 12-yard pass from Taylor Potts (Matt Williams kick), 7:55. Red Raiders 17–13. Drive: 3 plays, 32 yards, 1:04.

Fourth quarter

- TTU – Matt Williams 43-yard field goal, 6:24. Red Raiders 20–13. Drive: 13 plays, 54 yards, 4:57.

Top passers

- TTU – Taylor Potts – 31/49, 269 yards, 2 TD, INT
- BAY – Blake Szymanski – 22/35, 238 yards, INT

Top rushers

- TTU – Baron Batch – 18 rushes, 69 yards
- BAY – Jay Finley – 18 rushes, 55 yards

Top receivers

- TTU – Austin Zouzalik – 7 receptions, 92 yards
- BAY – David Alexander Gettis – 3 receptions, 69 yards

=== Vs. Michigan State (Valero Alamo Bowl) ===
Michigan State Spartans vs. Texas Tech Red Raiders (Alamo Bowl) – Game summary

Quarter	1	2	3	4	Total
Spartans	7	7	14	3	31
Red Raiders	7	13	7	14	41

at Alamodome, San Antonio, Texas

- Date: January 2, 2010
- Game time: 8:00 p.m.
- Game weather: None (indoor stadium)
- Game attendance: 64,757
- Referee: Tom Ritter
- TV announcers (ESPN/ESPN Radio): Mike Patrick (play-by-play), Bob Davie (analyst), and Holly Rowe (sideline)/Bill Rosinski (play-by-play), Dennis Franchione, and Joe Schad (sideline)
- Box score, Recap

Game information

First quarter

- TTU – Baron Batch 3-yard run (Matt Williams kick), 8:00. Red Raiders 7–0. Drive: 9 plays, 61 yards, 3:43.
- MSU – Edwin Baker 46-yard run (Brett Swenson kick), 3:47. Tied 7–7. Drive: 2 plays, 65 yards, 0:36.

Second quarter

- TTU – Matt Williams 21-yard field goal, 14:11. Red Raiders 10–7. Drive: 11 plays, 70 yards, 4:17.
- TTU – Lyle Leong 2-yard pass from Taylor Potts (Matt Williams kick), 11:01. Red Raiders 17–7. Drive: 4 plays, 53 yards, 2:00.
- MSU – Keshawn Martin 48-yard pass from Kirk Cousins (Brett Swenson kick), 8:06. Red Raiders 17–14. Drive: 6 plays, 77 yards, 2:48.
- TTU – Matt Williams 38-yard field goal, 0:20. Red Raiders 20–14. Drive: 9 plays, 37 yards, 2:28.

Third quarter

- MSU – Keith Nichol 7-yard run (Brett Swenson kick), 12:15. Spartans 21–20. Drive: 5 plays, 26 yards, 2:40.
- TTU – Jacoby Franks 14-yard pass from Taylor Potts (Matt Williams kick), 6:32. Red Raiders 27–21. Drive: 9 plays, 92 yards, 3:05.
- MSU – Blair White 8-yard pass from Keshawn Martin (Brett Swenson kick), 1:18. Spartans 28–27. Drive: 6 plays, 80 yards, 2:19.

Fourth quarter

- MSU – Brett Swenson 44-yard field goal, 8:05. Spartans 31–27. Drive: 10 plays, 46 yards, 5:36.
- TTU – Detron Lewis 11-yard pass from Steven Sheffield (Matt Williams kick), 5:03. Red Raiders 34–31. Drive: 8 plays, 77 yards, 3:02.
- TTU – Baron Batch 13-yard run (Matt Williams kick), 2:08. Red Raiders 41–31. Drive: 9 plays, 35 yards, 2:11.

Top passers

- MSU – Kirk Cousins – 13/27, 220 yards, TD, 2 INT
- TTU – Taylor Potts – 29/43, 372 yards, 2 TD, INT

Top rushers

- MSU – Edwin Baker – 12 rushes, 97 yards, TD
- TTU – Baron Batch – 22 rushes, 100 yards, 2 TD

Top receivers

- MSU – Blair White – 6 receptions, 114 yards, TD
- TTU – Detron Lewis – 10 receptions, 114 yards, TD

== Rankings ==
Ranking movements Legend: ██ Increase in ranking ██ Decrease in ranking — = Not ranked RV = Received votes
	Week															
Poll	Pre	1	2	3	4	5	6	7	8	9	10	11	12	13	14	Final
AP	RV	RV	RV	RV	—	—	RV	21	RV	RV	RV	RV	RV	RV	RV	21
Coaches	RV	RV	RV	RV	—	—	RV	24	RV	RV	RV	RV	RV	RV	RV	23
Harris	Not released				—	—	—	22	—	—	—	—	—	—	—	Not released
BCS	Not released							—	—	—	—	—	—	—	—	Not released
