= 2011 TicketCity Bowl =

Northwestern Wildcats	Texas Tech Red Raiders
(7–5)	(7–5)
Big Ten	Big 12
38	45
Head coach: Pat Fitzgerald	Head coach: Tommy Tuberville
	1	2	3	4	Total
Northwestern	0	6	18	14	38
Texas Tech	10	14	14	7	45
- Date: January 1, 2011
- Season: 2010
- Stadium: Cotton Bowl
- Location: Fair Park; Dallas, Texas
- MVP: Taylor Potts (QB, Texas Tech)
- Favorite: Texas Tech by 9
- Referee: Terry Leyden (MWC)
- Attendance: 40,121
- Payout: US$1.2 million (per team)

United States TV coverage
- Network: ESPNU
- Announcers: Dave Pasch, Bob Griese, Chris Spielman and Quint Kessenich

The 2011 TicketCity Bowl was a college football bowl game played at Cotton Bowl in Dallas, Texas. The game was played on January 1, 2011, at 12:00 p.m. ET and was telecast on ESPNU. This game replaced the Cotton Bowl Classic, which moved from its long-time home to Cowboys Stadium in nearby Arlington in 2010, and pitted the Northwestern Wildcats from the Big Ten Conference against the Texas Tech Red Raiders from the Big 12 Conference. The game was originally labeled "The Dallas Football Classic," but on November 8, 2010, a deal was announced for TicketCity to become the title sponsor of the bowl.

== Teams ==
=== Northwestern Wildcats ===
Northwestern was invited to the TicketCity Bowl after posting a 7–5 record in the regular season. The Wildcats made a school-record third-consecutive bowl appearance. The Wildcats had not won a bowl game since defeating California in the 1949 Rose Bowl. They fell to Auburn, 38–35, in overtime of the Outback Bowl last season. Northwestern has gone 0–2 since losing starting quarterback Dan Persa to a season-ending injury.

=== Texas Tech Red Raiders ===
Texas Tech finished the regular season with a 7–5 record. The Red Raiders lost to three ranked opponents, Oklahoma, Oklahoma State and Texas, and defeated one, Missouri. They were on a two-game winning streak leading into the bowl game. Tech was ranked #24 in Jeff Sagarin's BCS computer ranking heading into the bowl matchup. This was the Raiders' eleventh-straight bowl game. They have gone 6–2 in their last eight bowl games, including defeating Michigan State in last year's Alamo Bowl 41–31.

== Game notes ==
Northwestern made its first appearance in a bowl game at the Cotton Bowl, while Texas Tech playing in its fifth bowl at the Stadium. The two teams had never played each other in the history of their programs. With the win, Tech won their first bowl game at the Cotton Bowl after failing the past four times in a drought that had begun in 1939.

== Game summary ==
=== Scoring summary ===
Scoring Play	Score
1st Quarter
TTU - Matt Williams 24-yard field goal, 5:18	TTU 3–0
TTU - Taylor Potts 13-yard pass to Austin Zouszalik (Matt Williams Kick), 0:39	TTU 10–0
2nd Quarter
NW - Kain Colter 1-yard run (Two-Point conversion failed), 6:47	TTU 10–6
TTU - Taylor Potts 1-yard run (Matt Williams Kick), 4:15	TTU 17–6
TTU - Taylor Potts 6-yard pass to Lyle Leong (Matt Williams Kick), 0:11	TTU 24–6
3rd Quarter
NW - Stefan Demos 18-yard field goal, 11:25	TTU 24–9
TTU - Eric Stephans 86-yard run (Matt Williams Kick), 11:05	TTU 31–9
NW - Kain Colter 1-yard run (Kain Colter pass to Josh Rooks), 6:12	TTU 31–17
TTU - Taylor Potts 6-yard pass to Tramain Swindall (Matt Williams Kick), 2:29	TTU 38–17
NW - Evan Watkins 4-yard run (Stefan Demos Kick), 1:52	TTU 38–24
4th Quarter
NW - Evan Watkins 18-yard pass to Demetrius Fields (Stefan Demos Kick), 10:33	TTU 38–31
TTU - Taylor Potts 11-yard pass to Lyle Leong (Matt Williams Kick), 7:13	TTU 45–31
NW - 39-yard interception return by Jordan Mabin (Stefan Demos Kick), 5:37	TTU 45–38
