= Taylor Potts =

American football player (born 1987)

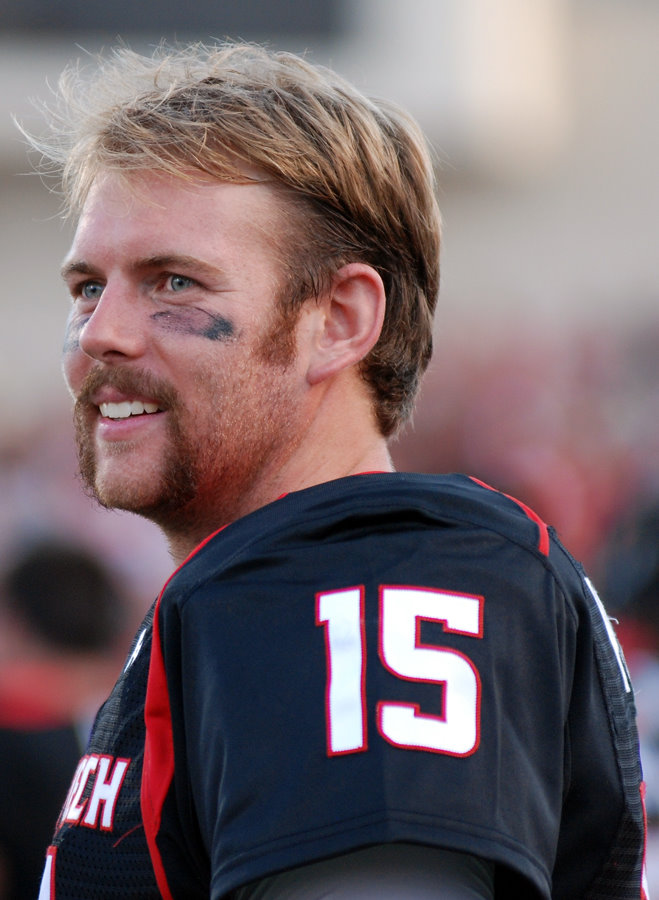
- Potts with Texas Tech in 2009

No. 9
- Position: Quarterback

Personal information
- Born: October 13, 1987 (age 39); Abilene, Texas, U.S.
- Listed height: 6 ft 5 in (1.96 m)
- Listed weight: 222 lb (101 kg)

Career information
- High school: Abilene (TX)
- College: Texas Tech
- NFL draft: 2011: undrafted

Career history
- St. Louis Rams (2011)*; San Diego Chargers (2012)*
- * Offseason or practice squad member only
- Stats at Pro Football Reference

Taylor Potts (born October 13, 1987) is an American former football quarterback. He played college football at Texas Tech, and was signed by the St. Louis Rams as an undrafted free agent in 2011. He was waived during training camp, and then signed as a free agent by the San Diego Chargers in May 2012, where he was expected to compete for the third-string quarterback position.

At Texas Tech, Potts served as a backup for quarterback Graham Harrell and took over the starting role in 2009.

== Early life ==
Prior to coming to Texas Tech, Potts played football at Abilene High School in Abilene, Texas. In his senior season, Potts threw for 3,162 yards and 53 touchdowns and garnered Class 5A Region and All-State teams. In addition to Texas Tech, Potts was recruited by Michigan, Baylor, Notre Dame, Oklahoma, Texas, and Texas A&M.

== College career ==
=== 2006–2008 seasons ===
Potts spent his 2006 freshman season as a redshirt, seeing no game action but working as a member of the scout team. He then served as a backup to Graham Harrell for the 2007 and 2008 seasons, seeing limited playing time in several Tech blowout victories. In those two seasons, he compiled 669 yards passing, 5 touchdowns, and 2 interceptions.

=== 2009 season ===
Potts was named Harrell's heir apparent and starter by Mike Leach in April 2009. Potts beat out classmate and former walk-on Steven Sheffield and highly touted redshirt freshman Seth Doege. In his first game against the North Dakota Fighting Sioux, he completed 34 of 48 passes for 405 yards 2 touchdowns passing and 2 on the ground, and threw three interceptions in a 38–13 win. The next week against the Rice Owls, Potts threw 7 touchdowns and no interceptions in 55–10 blowout win. For his performance, he was named Big 12 Conference Offensive Player of the Week. The next week, Potts played his best game to date as he faced off against the No. 2 Texas Longhorns quarterbacked by Colt McCoy. Potts started slow but ended up with 46 completions out of 62 attempts for 420 yards, 3 touchdowns and an interception. Potts took a vicious hit from Texas defensive end Sergio Kindle that caused a turnover that in effect sealed the close win for the Longhorns, but got back up to throw his third touchdown of the game to Tramain Swindall. Despite losing 34–24, pundits noted that Potts outplayed McCoy with better numbers, and going into a hostile environment against a top 2 team and taking a vicious hit in the process.

Tech fans were optimistic after the Texas game, but they lost 29–28 to Houston after the Texas Tech offense failed to convert on fourth and goal from inside the one. Critics blamed Potts' inability to use his 6'6" frame to punch the ball in and seal the victory. In the next game against the New Mexico Lobos, Potts started slow and was knocked out with a Concussion. With the game tied at 7 with a minute left, Sheffield came in and scored to give the Raiders the lead en route to a 48–28 win. Potts was taken to the hospital and sat out the next 2 games, as Sheffield led Tech to blowout wins over Kansas State and Nebraska 66–14 and 31–10, respectively. Potts found himself back as the starter against Texas A&M after Sheffield broke his foot against Nebraska. Potts played poorly and was benched by Leach for Doege to the chants from the crowd of "No more Potts". Tech lost to A&M 52–30.

Doege started the next game against Kansas but was largely ineffective and Potts led the Raiders to a 42–21 win off the strength of the ground game. Potts had a fairly effective game despite a 24–17 loss to Oklahoma State in the next week. Potts delivered his biggest win to date, a 41–13 drubbing of the Oklahoma Sooners and finished the season with a 20–13 win over Baylor, giving Tech an 8–4 overall record and 5–3 in Big 12 play.

Tech was invited to the Alamo Bowl against Michigan State. Although Sheffield was healthy, Potts was given the start. Potts was effective for most of the game, but was pulled late in the fourth quarter by the interim staff (Leach had been fired earlier in the week). With Tech behind, Sheffield rallied Tech to two late scores to beat the Spartans 41–31. Potts was named offensive MVP with 29–43 passing for 372 yards and 2 touchdowns.

=== 2010 season ===
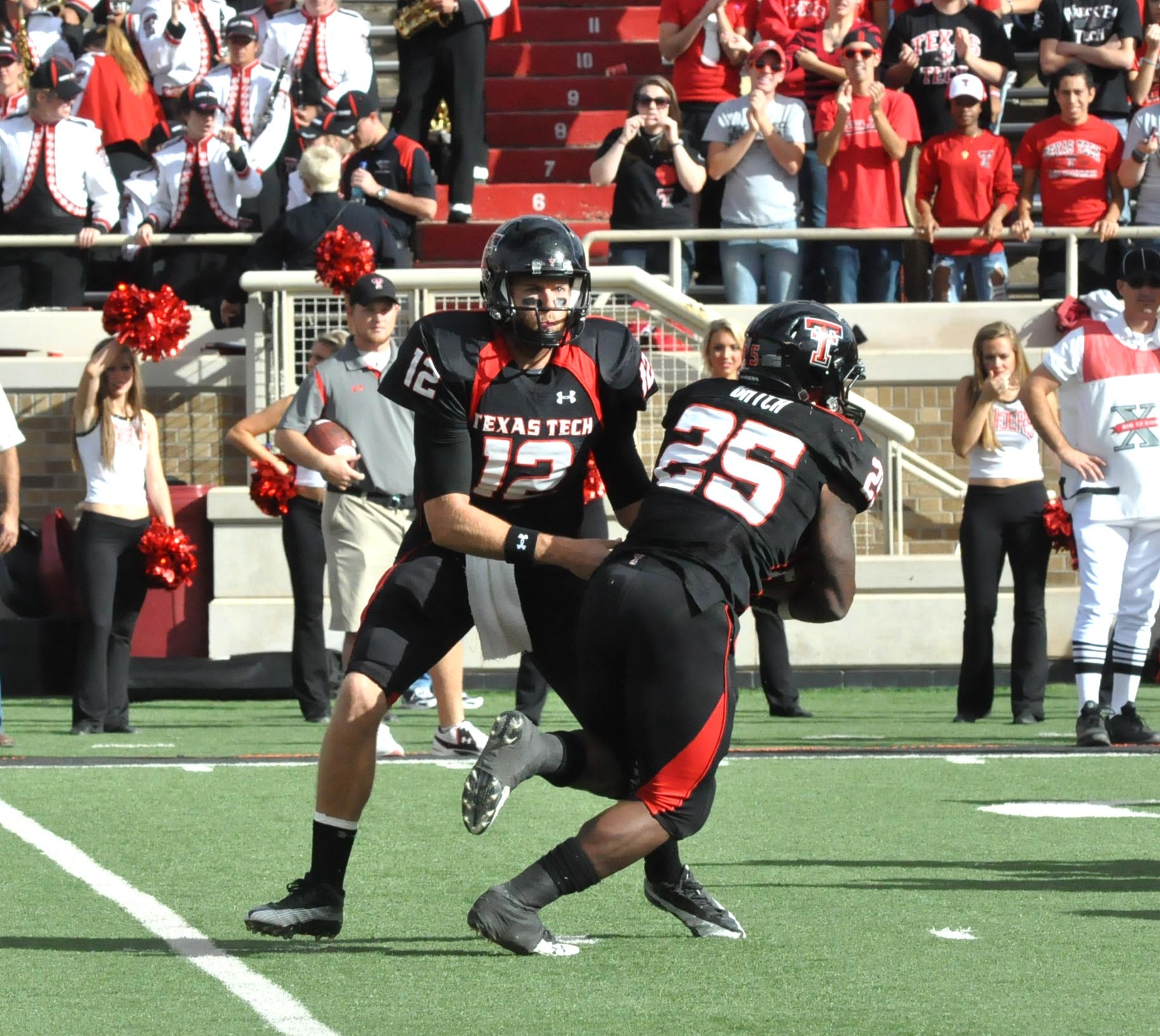
Potts hands off the ball to tailback Baron Batch during Tech's win over Weber State.

After battling against Sheffield for the starting quarterback job in spring and summer practices, Potts was named the starter for the 2010 season under new Red Raider head coach Tommy Tuberville and offensive coordinator Neal Brown. Potts suffered a hand injury in spring 2010 workouts and missed the spring Red-Black scrimmage. However, he was named the starter for Tech's season opener against SMU. Potts threw for 359 yards, completing 34 of 53 passes, as Tech won.

Potts started every game for Tech during the season except for the November 6 game against No. 14 Missouri. Sheffield started that game, but Potts came in shortly before halftime and led Tech to a 24–17 upset win. Potts was named the AT&T/ESPN All-America Player of the Week after passing for a Cotton Bowl-record 462 yards in Tech's 45–38 win over Baylor on October 9. In his final home game, against Houston on November 27, Potts threw for 373 yards in a 35–20 win.

For the season, Potts finished with 3,726 passing yards, completing 369 of 551 passes (67.0 percent) with 35 touchdowns and 10 interceptions. He finished his final season as Tech's fourth-ranked all-time leader in passing yards (7,835) and the school's third-ranked all-time leader in touchdown passes thrown with 62.

Texas Tech faced Northwestern in the inaugural TicketCity Bowl. Potts threw for 369 yards, completing 43 of 56 passes in Tech's 45–38 win. Potts connected with former high school teammate Lyle Leong for two touchdown and also had scoring passes to Austin Zouzalik and Swindall. Potts also scored one touchdown on a perfectly executed trick play, a double pass from Potts to Zouzalik and back to Potts. For his efforts, Potts was named Offensive Most Valuable Player.

=== Statistics ===
Season	Team	Games			Passing								Rushing			
Season	Team	GP	GS	Record	Cmp	Att	Pct	Yds	Y/A	TD	Int	Rtg	Att	Yds	Avg	TD
2006	Texas Tech	0	0	—	Redshirted (redshirt)											
2007	Texas Tech	5	0	—	32	49	65.3	409	8.3	3	1	151.5	2	–20	–10.0	0
2008	Texas Tech	10	0	—	23	36	63.9	260	7.2	2	1	137.3	0	0	0.0	0
2009	Texas Tech	11	10	6–4	309	470	65.7	3,440	7.3	22	13	137.1	24	–166	–6.9	2
2010	Texas Tech	13	12	7–5	369	551	67.0	3,726	6.8	35	10	141.1	33	4	0.1	2
Career		39	22	13–9	733	1,106	66.3	7,835	7.1	62	25	139.8	59	–182	–3.1	4

== Professional career ==
Potts went undrafted in the 2011 NFL draft and was later signed by the St. Louis Rams on July 26, 2011, but was waived on August 15.

In May 2012, Potts was signed as a free agent and agreed to terms with the San Diego Chargers after a workout with the team. He was subsequently released.

== Personal life ==
As of 2011, Potts was engaged to Erin Methvin, alumna of Lubbock Christian University.

== See also ==
- 2007 Texas Tech Red Raiders football team
- 2008 Texas Tech Red Raiders football team
