= 2010 Alamo Bowl (January) =

2010 Valero Alamo Bowl
Michigan State Spartans	Texas Tech Red Raiders
(6–6)	(8–4)
Big Ten	Big 12
31	41
Head coach: Mark Dantonio	Head coach: Ruffin McNeill (interim)
	1	2	3	4	Total
Michigan State	7	7	14	3	31
Texas Tech	7	13	7	14	41
- Date: January 2, 2010
- Season: 2009
- Stadium: Alamodome
- Location: San Antonio, Texas
- MVP: Offensive: Taylor Potts (QB, Texas Tech); Defensive: Jamar Wall (Texas Tech)
- Favorite: Texas Tech by 9
- National anthem: Alamo City Brass
- Referee: Tom Ritter (Southeastern Conference)
- Attendance: 64,757
- Payout: US$2,200,000 (As of 2006)

United States TV coverage
- Network: ESPN
- Announcers: Mike Patrick, Bob Davie and Holly Rowe
- Nielsen ratings: 4.8

The 2010 Alamo Bowl (known via corporate sponsorship as the Valero Alamo Bowl) was a college football bowl game played at the Alamodome in San Antonio, Texas on Saturday, January 2, 2010. It was the 17th edition of the Alamo Bowl. The game featured the Michigan State Spartans against the Texas Tech Red Raiders.

The 2010 game was the last one to feature a team from the Big Ten Conference. In the fall of 2009, it was announced that the Pacific-10 Conference's second-place team would take part in the Alamo Bowl instead of the Holiday Bowl.

This was the third Alamo Bowl appearance and first Alamo Bowl win for the Texas Tech Red Raiders. Their previous appearance was a 19–16 loss to Iowa in the 2001 game. Michigan State played in one previous Alamo Bowl, losing the 2003 game to Nebraska, 17–3. The game also marked the first-ever meeting between the two schools.

With approximately 5,553,630 households watching it, the game was the most viewed Alamo Bowl in history. It also drew the highest rating of any bowl ever shown by ESPN. Behind the BCS bowl games and the Capital One Bowl, it was the most viewed bowl shown up to that point in the 2009–10 bowl season.

== Game buildup ==
The game featured two programs which, prior to the event, were undergoing controversies.

On December 28, 2009, Texas Tech suspended, and fired two days later, head coach Mike Leach over the alleged mistreatment of an injured player. Defensive Coordinator Ruffin McNeill was named interim head coach.

Meanwhile, on November 22, 2009, Michigan State had suspended 14 players for the bowl resulting from a fight at one of the school's dormitories.

== Game summary ==
=== First quarter ===
Texas Tech won the coin toss and deferred to the second half. The 67 yard kick off by the Red Raiders was returned by Keshawn Martin for 33 yards. The Spartans made it all the way to the Texas Tech 32-yard line before their opening driving ended in disappointment, when Jamar Wall intercepted a pass by quarterback Kirk Cousins. The Red Raiders opening drive ended with a 3-yard rushing touchdown by Barron Batch. Both teams went three-and-out in their next drive. Michigan State's first score came in their third drive of the game by way of an explosive run by Edwin Baker for a 46-yard rushing touchdown. The Spartan's scoring drive would be the last of the quarter, bringing the score at the end of the quarter to 7–7.

=== Second quarter ===
At the end of the second quarter the Red Raiders were leading with a score of 20–14.

=== Third quarter ===
At the end of the third quarter the Spartans were leading with a score of 28–27.

=== Fourth quarter ===
Michigan State took a four-point lead with 8:05 left in the game after a field goal, but it was all Red Raiders after that point. The game ended with Texas Tech winning the game with a final score of 41–31.

=== Scoring summary ===
Scoring summary

Quarter	Time	Drive			Team	Scoring information	Score	
Quarter	Time	Plays	Yards	TOP	Team	Scoring information	MSU	TTU
1	8:00	9	61	3:43	TTU	Baron Batch 3-yard touchdown run, Matt Williams kick good	0	7
1	3:47	2	65	0:36	MSU	Edwin Baker 46-yard touchdown run, Brett Swenson kick good	7	7
2	14:11	11	70	4:17	TTU	21-yard field goal by Matt Williams	7	10
2	11:01	4	53	2:00	TTU	Lyle Leong 2-yard touchdown reception from Taylor Potts, Matt Williams kick good	7	17
2	8:06	6	77	2:48	MSU	Keshawn Martin 48-yard touchdown reception from Kirk Cousins, Brett Swenson kick good	14	17
2	0:20	9	37	2:28	TTU	38-yard field goal by Matt Williams	14	20
3	12:15	5	26	2:40	MSU	Keith Nichol 7-yard touchdown run, Brett Swenson kick good	21	20
3	6:32	9	92	3:05	TTU	Jacoby Franks 14-yard touchdown reception from Taylor Potts, Matt Williams kick good	21	27
3	1:18	6	80	2:19	MSU	Blair White 8-yard touchdown reception from Keshawn Martin, Brett Swenson kick good	28	27
4	8:05	10	46	5:36	MSU	44-yard field goal by Brett Swenson	31	27
4	5:03	8	77	3:02	TTU	Detron Lewis 11-yard touchdown reception from Steven Sheffield, Matt Williams kick good	31	34
4	2:08	9	35	2:11	TTU	Baron Batch 13-yard touchdown run, Matt Williams kick good	31	41
Final							31	41
