= 2008 Texas vs. Texas Tech football game =

2008 Texas vs. Texas Tech
- Conference game
Texas Longhorns	Texas Tech Red Raiders
(8–0)	(8–0)
33	39
Head coach: Mack Brown	Head coach: Mike Leach
AP / Coaches / BCS; 1 / 1 / 1	AP / Coaches / BCS; 6 / 5 / 7
	1	2	3	4	Total
Texas	0	6	13	14	33
Texas Tech	12	10	7	10	39
- Date: November 1, 2008
- Season: 2008
- Stadium: Jones AT&T Stadium
- Location: Lubbock, Texas
- Referee: Karl Richins
- Attendance: 56,333

United States TV coverage
- Network: ABC
- Announcers: Brent Musburger, Kirk Herbstreit
- Nielsen ratings: 12

The 2008 Texas vs. Texas Tech football game was a Big 12 Conference college football game played between the Texas Longhorns and Texas Tech Red Raiders at Jones AT&T Stadium in Lubbock, Texas. The game was played on November 1 and was one of the most memorable games in the two teams' rivalry. Heading into the game, both teams were undefeated at 8–0. Texas entered game as the top-ranked team in the nation, led by coach Mack Brown. The Red Raiders, headed by coach Mike Leach, were ranked sixth. The Red Raiders stunned the Longhorns 39–33 on a last-second touchdown pass. The game appeared over on the previous play, but Texas dropped a potential interception. The game is one of the greatest upsets in the rivalry's history and was crucial in producing a three-way tie in the Big 12 at the end of the season.

== Pregame ==
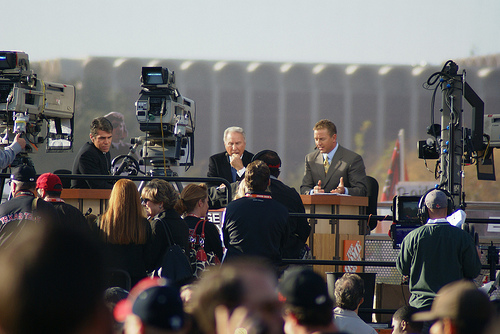
College GameDay broadcasting prior to the game

The rivalry between Texas Tech and Texas originated in Austin in 1928 and the two teams met annually since 1960 until 2024 when Texas moved to the SEC. Texas led the series 43–14, with the Red Raiders last win coming in a 42–38 upset of the #3 Longhorns in Lubbock in 2002. In the 2006 contest, #5 Texas narrowly came away with a 35–31 win over an unranked Texas Tech team at Jones AT&T Stadium. In the 2007 game, #14 Texas won 59–43.

On the day of the game, ESPN's College GameDay broadcast from Lubbock for the first time.

== Game summary ==
=== First quarter ===
The Red Raiders received the opening kickoff, but their opening drive stalled out when quarterback Graham Harrell was sacked at the Texas 44-yard line on third down. The punt pinned the Longhorns at their own 2-yard line, and on their first play from scrimmage, they were forced into the end zone for a safety, giving Tech the first points of the game. The Red Raiders' next drive would result in a 29-yard Matt Williams field goal, and after the Longhorns had to punt again, Texas Tech finished the first quarter with a 3-yard touchdown run by Baron Batch as the clock ran out, giving them a 12–0 lead following the extra point.

=== Second quarter ===
Texas Tech's early dominance continued as the Longhorn offense went three-and-out on each of their first two drives of the second quarter, and Tech's first possession of the quarter resulted in another touchdown, extending the lead to 19–0. However, their second possession ended with the first turnover of the game when Texas linebacker Sergio Kindle forced wide receiver Michael Crabtree to fumble at the Texas Tech 29. A 43-yard Hunter Lawrence field goal would get the Longhorns on the board, though the Red Raiders would come back to answer with a field goal of their own, giving Texas the ball with 1:37 left in the half. The Longhorns would get as far as the Tech 8 before settling for a field goal as time expired, and the first half would end with the Red Raiders leading 22–6.

=== Third quarter ===
Texas received the ball to start the second half and was unable to cross midfield on their opening drive, but a 61-yard punt pinned the Red Raiders at their own 1-yard line, where they would go three-and-out, Jordan Shipley returning the ensuing punt 45 yards for a touchdown to bring the Longhorns within 9. Their next drive would stall out just past midfield, but a pair of penalties had the Longhorns facing second-and-22 from their own 7-yard line. Texas quarterback Colt McCoy was then intercepted by safety Daniel Charbonnet, who returned it 18 yards for a Red Raiders touchdown, pushing the lead back to 16 points. The teams would trade punts before the Longhorns scored again with 12 seconds left in the quarter, Malcolm Williams catching a 37-yard pass from McCoy. The Longhorns then attempted a 2-point conversion to get within 8 points, but McCoy's pass was knocked down, and Texas trailed 29–19 after three quarters.

=== Fourth quarter ===
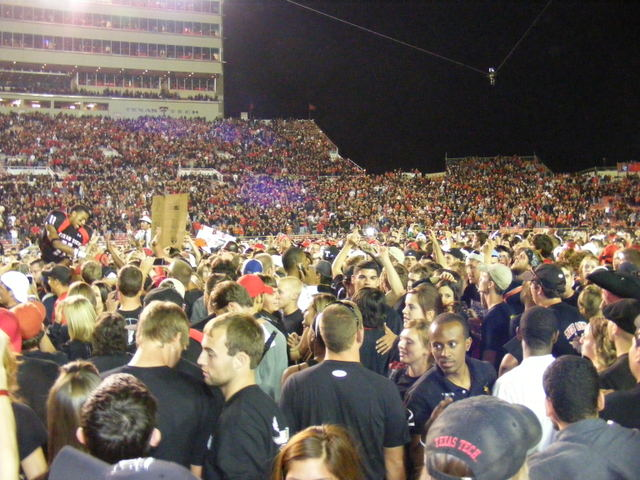
Students and fans rush the field after the #7 Red Raiders upset the #1 Longhorns.

Harrell quickly led the Red Raiders down the field on the first drive of the fourth quarter, where they would reach second-and-7 from the Texas 9, but an incompletion and a sack for a 16-yard loss would force a Matt Williams field goal attempt, which the Longhorns would block. McCoy then hit Malcolm Williams for a 91-yard touchdown pass on the first play from scrimmage, and the extra point cut the deficit to 29–26 with 11 minutes remaining. The Red Raiders' next drive would eat up 5:15 and ended with a 42-yard Donnie Carona field goal. McCoy then led the Longhorns on an 11-play, 80-yard drive, completing four of five pass attempts as well as gaining 11 rushing yards on two carries, culminating in a 4-yard touchdown run by Vondrell McGee. Lawrence's extra point made it 33–32 Longhorns, their first lead of the game, with 1:29 left on the clock. The Red Raiders returned the kickoff to their 38-yard line, where Harrell went to work, completing passes of 8, 5, 11, and 10 yards to get a first down at the Texas 28-yard line with 15 seconds remaining. Harrell's next pass was deflected to Texas safety Blake Gideon, but Gideon was unable to catch what would have been a game-clinching interception, giving Harrell another chance with eight seconds to go. Harrell's pass went to Crabtree, who caught it near the sideline at the 6-yard line, broke a tackle, and went in for the touchdown with one second remaining. Thousands of Texas Tech fans rushed the field and had to be shooed off as officials reviewed the play to make sure Crabtree had stayed in bounds. Referee Karl Richins announced confirmation of Crabtree's touchdown, and the Red Raider fans rushed the field a second time with one second still remaining on the game clock. As a result, the Red Raiders were charged with two excessive celebration penalties and had to kick off from their own 7-yard line following the extra point. However, Texas was unable to convert the kickoff for a touchdown, with Texas Tech recovering an errant lateral attempt to ice the 39–33 win.

== Scoring summary ==
Scoring summary

Quarter	Time	Drive			Team	Scoring information	Score	
Quarter	Time	Plays	Yards	TOP	Team	Scoring information	UT	TTU
1	10:38				TTU	Chris Ogbonnaya tackled in end zone for a safety by Colby Whitlock	0	2
1	6:47	11	52	3:51	TTU	29-yard field goal by Matt Williams	0	5
1	0:00	10	96	4:19	TTU	Baron Batch 3-yard touchdown run, Matt Williams kick good	0	12
2	9:39	8	83	3:16	TTU	Eric Morris 18-yard touchdown reception from Graham Harrell, Matt Williams kick good	0	19
2	5:27	6	3	3:16	UT	43-yard field goal by Hunter Lawrence	3	19
2	1:37	8	46	3:50	TTU	31-yard field goal by Matt Williams	3	22
2	0:00	10	72	1:37	UT	25-yard field goal by Hunter Lawrence	6	22
3	10:26				UT	Jordan Shipley 35-yard punt return, Hunter Lawrence kick good	13	22
3	7:33				TTU	Interception returned 18 yards for touchdown by Daniel Charbonnet, Matt Williams kick good	13	29
3	0:12	6	58	2:26	UT	Malcolm Williams 37-yard touchdown reception from Colt McCoy, 2-point pass failed	19	29
4	11:00	1	91	0:14	UT	Malcolm Williams 91-yard touchdown reception from Colt McCoy, Hunter Lawrence kick good	26	29
4	5:45	13	55	5:15	TTU	42-yard field goal by Donnie Carona	26	32
4	1:29	11	80	4:16	UT	Vondrell McGee 4-yard touchdown run, Hunter Lawrence kick good	33	32
4	0:01	6	77	1:28	TTU	Michael Crabtree 28-yard touchdown reception from Graham Harrell, Donnie Carona kick good	33	39
"TOP" = time of possession. For other American football terms, see Glossary of American football.							33	39

== Statistics ==
Statistics	Texas	Texas Tech
First downs	18	31
Total yards	374	579
Rushing yards	80	105
Passing yards	294	474
Turnovers	2	1

Team	Category	Player	Statistics
Texas	Passing	Colt McCoy	20/34, 294 yards, 2 TD, INT
Texas	Rushing	Fozzy Whittaker	6 rushes, 42 yards
Texas	Receiving	Malcolm Williams	4 receptions, 182 yards, 2 TD
Texas Tech	Passing	Graham Harrell	36/53, 474 yards, 2 TD
Texas Tech	Rushing	Shannon Woods	15 rushes, 71 yards
Texas Tech	Receiving	Edward Britton	7 receptions, 139 yards

== Aftermath ==
Texas Tech's victory raised its record to 9–0, while Texas' loss dropped it to a record of 8–1. The following Monday, the polls reflected the game's outcome and Texas Tech rose from 6th to 2nd in the AP Poll, 5th to 3rd in the Coaches Poll, and 7th to 2nd in the BCS rankings while Texas dropped from 1st in all three polls to 5th in the AP, 7th in the Coaches, and 4th in the BCS rankings.

== Legacy ==
The game was named ESPN Classic's game of the week. In 2010, Stewart Mandel named the game as his Moment of the Year for the 2008 season. In 2009, Michael Crabtree's last second catch was named as the 2nd most memorable moment in Big 12 Conference history by ESPN, with the San Antonio Express-News listing it in its top 12. Following the season, the Los Angeles Times listed the game as one of the top 10 moments of the season.

Following the end of the Bowl Championship Series to transition into the College Football Playoff, Yahoo! Sports listed the game as one of the top 50 moments in the entire 15 year era. Sporting News ranked the game as 7th in their top 10 moments in the BCS era. The notable nature of the game also earned a profile in the National Football Foundation's This Week In College Football History series. In 2014, the NFL Network listed the game as one of the best 10 games in the 2000s.
