= Jamar Wall =

American gridiron football player (born 1988)

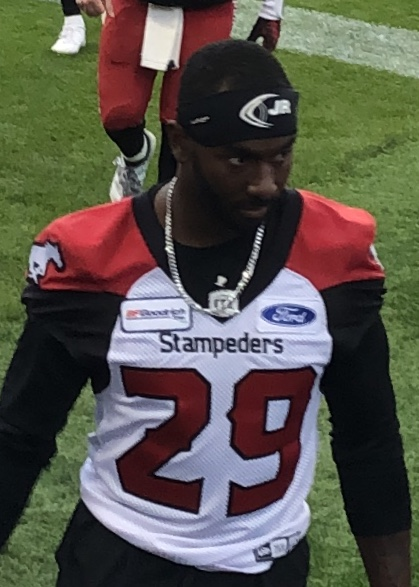
- Wall with the Calgary Stampeders in 2019

No. 29
- Position: Defensive back

Personal information
- Born: January 10, 1988 (age 38); Lubbock, Texas, U.S.
- Listed height: 5 ft 10 in (1.78 m)
- Listed weight: 204 lb (93 kg)

Career information
- High school: Plainview (Plainview, Texas)
- College: Texas Tech
- NFL draft: 2010: 6th round, 196th overall pick

Career history
- 2010: Dallas Cowboys*
- 2010: Houston Texans
- 2010: Philadelphia Eagles
- 2012: Georgia Force
- 2012–2021: Calgary Stampeders
- * Offseason or practice squad member only

Awards and highlights
- 2× Grey Cup champion (2014, 2018); 2× CFL All-Star (2014, 2016); 2× CFL West All-Star (2014, 2016); 2× Second-team All-Big 12 (2007, 2008); Academic All-Big 12 (2007)
- Stats at Pro Football Reference
- Stats at CFL.ca
- Stats at ArenaFan.com

Jamar Wall (born January 10, 1988) is an American former professional football player who was a defensive back for the Calgary Stampeders of the Canadian Football League (CFL). He also was a member of the Dallas Cowboys, Houston Texans and Philadelphia Eagles of the National Football League (NFL). He played college football at Texas Tech.

== Early life ==
Wall was born on January 10, 1988, in Lubbock, Texas.

Wall attended Plainview High School where he played as a running back, defensive back and punter. As a junior, he posted 308 carries for 2,024 yards, 28 touchdowns and 10 receptions for 113 yards. As a senior, he received All-State honors after registering 2,735 rushing yards, 42 touchdowns, 2 interceptions and a punt returned for a touchdown, while leading the Class 4A in rushing yards and scoring. He was named to the Amarillo Globe-News Golden Spread Team and as its player of the year.

== College career ==
Wall accepted a football scholarship from Texas Tech University. As a true freshman, he tallied 11 games, 12 tackles and 2 passes defensed. As a sophomore, he appeared in 13 games with 12 starts, registering 54 tackles, 5 interceptions (led the team) and 6 passes defensed, while receiving second-team All-Big 12 honors.

As a junior, he appeared in 13 games with 12 starts, collecting 62 tackles (one for loss), 2 interceptions and 11 passes defensed. As a senior, he started all 13 games, recording 58 tackles (2 for loss), 2 interceptions and 15 passes defensed. He was named the defensive MVP of the 2010 Alamo Bowl.

He finished his college career with 186 tackles (3 for loss), 9 interceptions, 34 passes defensed and 2 forced fumbles in 50 games played (38 starts).

== Professional career ==
=== Dallas Cowboys ===
Wall was selected by the Dallas Cowboys in the sixth round (196th overall) of the 2010 NFL draft. He was signed to a four-year contract on July 21. He was waived during final roster cuts on September 4.

=== Houston Texans ===
Wall was claimed off waivers by the Houston Texans on September 5, 2010. He was only active in the team's season-opener against the Indianapolis Colts and recorded one tackle. He was released on September 29.

=== Philadelphia Eagles ===
Wall was signed to the Philadelphia Eagles' practice squad on September 30, 2010. He was switched to safety and was promoted to the active roster on December 21 after Nate Allen was placed on the injured reserve list.

He was cut on December 31, but was re-signed to the practice squad on January 3, 2011, before being signed to a future contract on January 13. He was waived on August 29, but was re-signed on September 1, only to be waived again the next day.

=== Georgia Force ===
On February 2, 2012, he was signed by the Georgia Force of the Arena Football League.

=== Calgary Stampeders ===
On June 10, 2012, Wall signed with the Calgary Stampeders of the Canadian Football League as a free agent, making 12 starts while playing the halfback and cornerback positions. He registered 33 tackles (1 for loss), 3 passes defensed and 2 sacks.

The next year, he played in 12 games, registered 41 tackles, 2 passes defensed and tied for the team-lead with 4 interceptions (tied for the team lead).

In 2014, he was a part of the Grey Cup winning team and received CFL All-star honors, while finishing with 18 starts, 62 tackles, 6 interceptions (tied for the league lead) and five passes defensed (tied for the team lead).

The next year, he started all 18 games, posting 70 tackles, 2 interceptions (one returned for a touchdown), 10 passes defensed (led the team) and 2 special teams tackles. He also had one punt return for six yards.

In 2016, he started 17 games at cornerback and one at safety, making 47 tackles (2 for loss), 3 forced fumbles (tied for the team lead), 4 interceptions (led the team), one interception returned for a 60-yard touchdown and 17 passes defensed (led the team). He received West Division and CFL All-star honors.

In 2017, he started 18 games, making 55 tackles (second on the team), 2 interceptions (tied for third on the team), 5 passes defensed, one forced fumble, one fumble recovery. He started in both post-season games, tallying 2 tackles (one for loss) and one quarterback pressure in the Grey Cup game.

Wall re-signed with the Stampeders on January 12, 2021. He became a free agent on February 8, 2022.
