= Rajon Henley =

American football player (born 1988)

No. 76
- Position: Defensive end

Personal information
- Born: March 22, 1988 (age 38); Galveston, Texas, U.S.
- Listed height: 6 ft 3 in (1.91 m)
- Listed weight: 248 lb (112 kg)

Career information
- High school: Ball (Galveston)
- College: Texas Tech (2006–2009)
- NFL draft: 2010: undrafted

Career history
- Atlanta Falcons (2010)*; BC Lions (2011–2012)
- * Offseason or practice squad member only

Awards and highlights
- Grey Cup champion (2011)

Career CFL statistics
- Games played: 3
- Tackles: 2
- Stats at CFL.ca

Rajon David Henley (born March 22, 1988) is an American former professional football defensive end who played in the Canadian Football League (CFL) with the BC Lions. He played college football for the Texas Tech Red Raiders. Henley also had a stint in the National Football League (NFL) for the Atlanta Falcons.

== Early life ==
Henley was born on March 22, 1988, in Galveston, Texas. He attended Ball High School in Galveston. Despite missing five games as a senior, Henley had 46 tackles, five sacks and two fumble recoveries. He committed to play college football at Texas Tech University.

== College career ==
Henley played college football for the Texas Tech Red Raiders from 2006 to 2009 and was a four-year letterman. He had 100 tackles, including 17 for loss, 11 sacks, one interception, six pass deflections and one forced fumble in 45 games. Henley earned an Big 12 honorable mention selection in 2007.

== Professional career ==
Pre-draft measurables
Height	Weight	40-yard dash	10-yard split	20-yard split	20-yard shuttle	Three-cone drill	Vertical jump	Broad jump	Bench press
6 ft 3 in (1.91 m)	248 lb (112 kg)	4.82 s	1.71 s	2.77 s	4.85 s	7.53 s	28 in (0.71 m)	9 ft 5 in (2.87 m)	22 reps
All values from Pro day

=== Atlanta Falcons ===
After going undrafted in the 2010 NFL draft, Henley signed with the Atlanta Falcons as an undrafted free agent. On August 17, he was waived by the team.

=== BC Lions ===
On June 6, 2011, Henley was signed by the BC Lions of the Canadian Football League (CFL). He was described by teammate, Aaron Hunt, as having pass rush moves that reminded him of two-time CFL MODP, Cameron Wake. On June 24, Henley was released by the Lions to undergo surgery on a bulging back disc. On August 27, he re-signed with the team. On October 15, Henley was placed on the injury list. On November 6, he was moved to the practice roster, where he stayed for the remainder of the season as the team won the 99th Grey Cup.

In 2012, Henley played in three games and made two tackles before he was placed on the injury list on July 27. On August 5, he was released by the Lions.
