= Steven Sheffield =

American football player (born 1988)

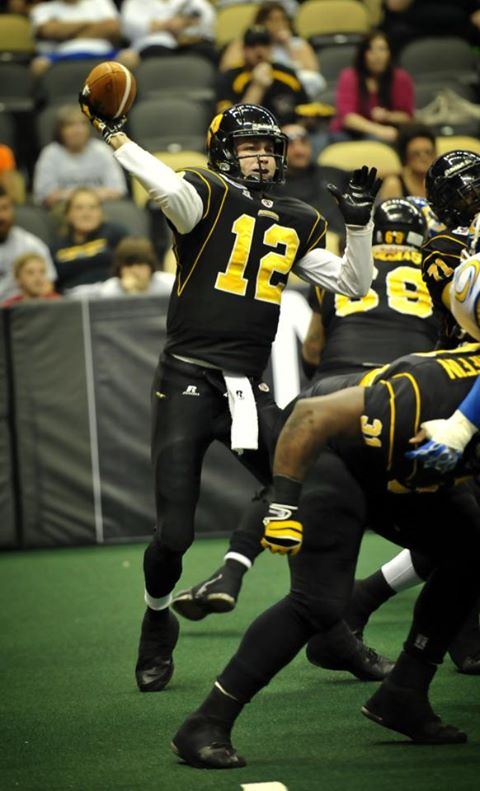
- Sheffield with the Pittsburgh Power in 2013

No. 12
- Position: Quarterback

Personal information
- Born: March 14, 1988 (age 38); Pflugerville, Texas, U.S.
- Listed height: 6 ft 4 in (1.93 m)
- Listed weight: 205 lb (93 kg)

Career information
- High school: John B. Connally (Austin, Texas)
- College: Texas Tech
- NFL draft: 2011: undrafted

Career history
- Spokane Shock (2011); San Antonio Talons (2012); Pittsburgh Power (2013)

Career AFL statistics
- Completions: 172
- Attempts: 289
- Passing yards: 2,156
- Touchdowns: 43
- Interceptions: 19
- Stats at ArenaFan.com

Steven Sheffield (born March 4, 1988) is an American former football quarterback. He played for the Spokane Shock, San Antonio Talons and Pittsburgh Power of the Arena Football League (AFL).

He played collegiately for the Texas Tech Red Raiders for four seasons, throwing for a total of 1,578 yards, 17 touchdowns, and 5 interceptions. Sheffield's record as a starter was 4–0 during his college career.

== Early life ==
Sheffield played football at John B. Connally High School in Pflugerville, Texas, where he led CHS to the Texas Class AAAA State Semifinals in 2004 and 2005 and won the District 26-4A District Championship in 2004 and 2005. During his final two seasons, he led his teams to a combined 23–6 record. He was first-team all-district in 2004 and district MVP and All-Centex in 2005. He passed for 1,600 yards in 2004 and followed with 2,700 yards in 2005 and also completed 34 touchdown passes to six interceptions. He was involved in Fellowship of Christian Athletes while in CHS. He was recruited by mainly Division II schools, but was contacted by former Tech Coach Mike Leach after former Alabama Crimson Tide quarterback Greg McElroy backed out of his commitment to Tech and Sheffield was offered a preferred walk-on spot at Texas Tech, which he accepted.

== College career ==
Sheffield enrolled at Tech when Tech with former Texas High School All-Stater Taylor Potts, whom he would do battle with later on for the starting spot. Graham Harrell and Chris Todd were the starter and backup, with Sheffield, Potts, and Ryan Rowland battling for scout team reps. Sheffield spent 2006 on the scout team.

Before the start of the 2007 season, Todd transferred to a junior college in Kansas. Harrell remained the starter, Potts became the backup and Sheffield became the third-string quarterback. Sheffield saw his first college in action in a 75–7 blowout win over Northwestern State University.

Sheffield spent the 2008 season on the scout team.

For 2009, Potts became the starting quarterback. Sheffield became the backup, and saw action in the second game against Rice University, when he threw a 26-yard touchdown to Tramain Swindall for his first career TD. After two effective games against ranked teams Texas and Houston, Potts was knocked out with a concussion late in the first half with the score tied at 7 with the New Mexico Lobos. Sheffield entered the game with just over one minute left and led a 4-play drive that was capped with a last second TD pass to flanker Alexander Torres, giving the Raiders a 14-7 halftime lead. Sheffield would then lead Tech to a 48-28 win. Teammates began calling Sheffield by the nickname of "Sticks" for his lanky 6-foot-4, 190-pound frame. The next game, against the Kansas State Wildcats, Sheffield threw for 7 touchdowns and 490 yards passing and the Red Raiders blew out the Wildcats, 66-14. Then facing off against # 15 Nebraska, Sheffield led the Red Raiders into Lincoln, as they beat the Huskers 31-10. However, Sheffield would break his foot while scoring on a quarterback keeper. Potts and third-string quarterback Seth Doege played the rest of the season.

Texas Tech ended up 8–4 overall and earned an invite to the Valero Alamo Bowl. Potts started and was named MVP of the game, although Sheffield did lead the Red Raiders on two touchdown drives to secure the win.

Tommy Tuberville was named as head football coach at Texas Tech after Mike Leach was fired, and new offensive coordinator Neal Brown named Potts the starter. He first saw action against New Mexico and was responsible for two touchdown drives, one passing and one running. After playing one series in the next game against the Texas Longhorns, Sheffield saw action as a wideout in the "Wild Raider" formation. After Potts continued to struggle, Sheffield was announced as the starting quarterback against the Missouri Tigers. Potts replaced an ineffective Sheffield, and started for the remainder of the season. Sheffield would play at quarterback for the final time against the Weber State Wildcats on Senior Day, and left the game to a standing ovation.

His final career numbers were 134 completions out of 194 attempts for a 65.6 career completion percentage, with 1,578 yards, 17 touchdowns, and only five interceptions. Sheffield graduated from Texas Tech University with a bachelor's degree in Communication Studies.

== Professional career ==
After college, Sheffield was invited to the Competitive Edge Sports NFL Preparation Camp in Atlanta, Georgia where he spent three months and performed well. At the end of 2012, Sheffield announced via Twitter and Facebook he was returning to Texas Tech to "focus on my education and future and put my football career on hold, for now."

In 2013, he was activated by the Arena Football League's Pittsburgh Power. In his first game, a 53-48 win against the Philadelphia Soul, Sheffield finished the game with 19-of-35 in passing for 272 yards and six touchdowns. Two weeks later, he beat the Cleveland Gladiators 55–44 after being down 44–28 with 13:58 left to play in the game. Sheffield was 18-30 (60%) he had 286 yards and 6 touchdowns to receive Offensive Player of the Game honors.

== Career statistics ==
=== AFL ===
Year	Team	Passing							Rushing		
Year	Team	Cmp	Att	Pct	Yds	TD	Int	Rtg	Att	Yds	TD
2011	Spokane	15	27	55.6	231	5	2	92.75	3	5	0
2012	San Antonio	3	10	30.0	47	0	2	7.08	0	0	0
2013	Pittsburgh	154	252	61.1	1,878	38	15	96.96	25	70	2
Career		172	289	59.5	2,156	43	19	92.57	28	75	2

=== College ===
Season	Team	Games			Passing								Rushing			
Season	Team	GP	GS	Record	Cmp	Att	Pct	Yds	Y/A	TD	Int	Rtg	Att	Yds	Avg	TD
2006	Texas Tech	0	0	—	Redshirted (redshirt)											
2007	Texas Tech	1	0	—												
2008	Texas Tech	0	0	—	DNP											
2009	Texas Tech	6	2	2–0	101	136	74.3	1,219	9.0	14	4	177.6	20	–41	–2.1	2
2010	Texas Tech	11	1	1–0	33	58	56.9	359	6.2	3	1	122.5	18	16	0.9	1
Career		18	3	3–0	134	194	69.1	1,578	8.1	17	5	161.2	38	–25	–0.7	3
