= Sergio Kindle =

American football player (born 1987)

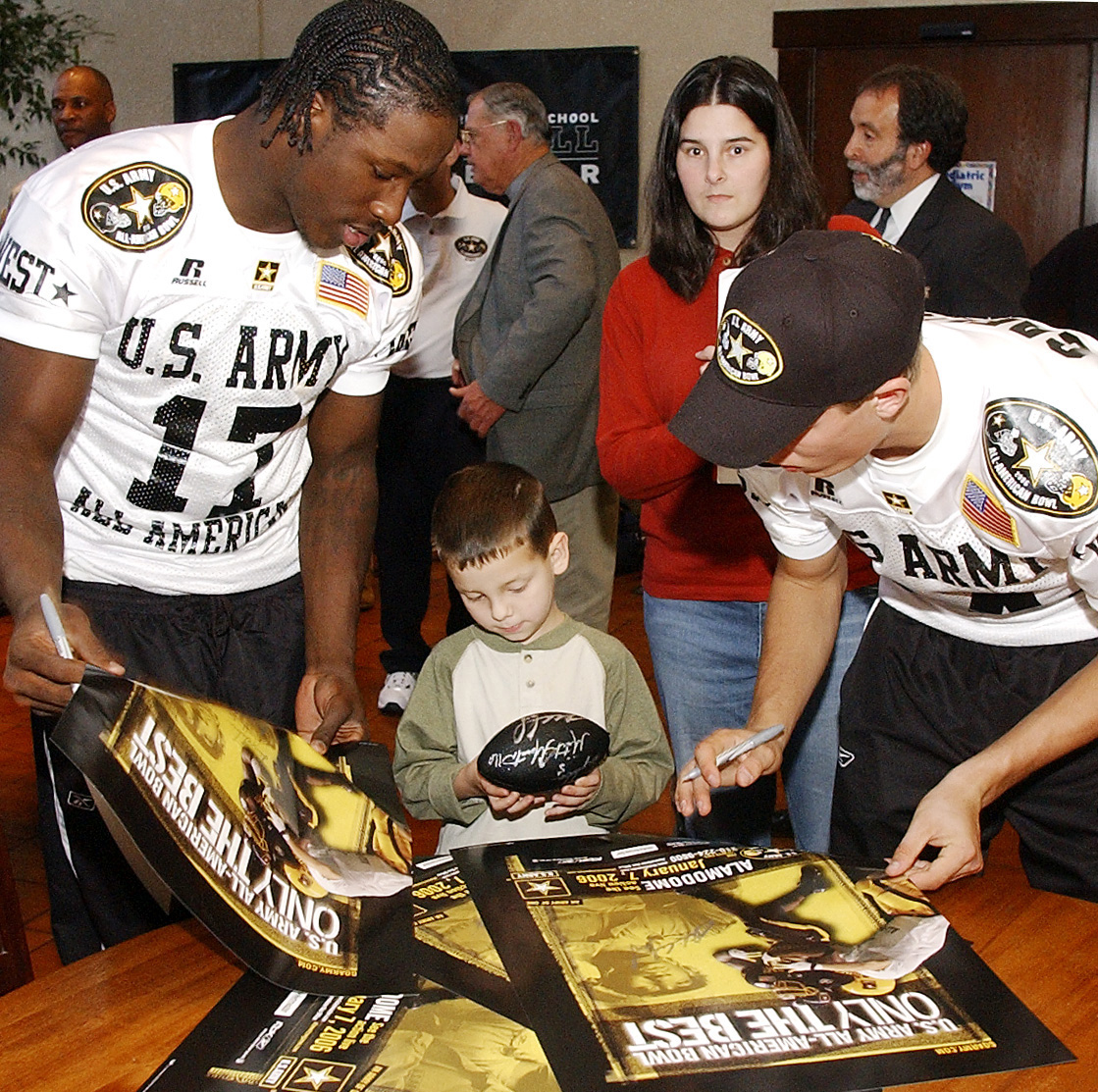
- Kindle (left) in 2006

No. 94
- Position: Linebacker

Personal information
- Born: September 20, 1987 (age 39); Los Angeles, California, U.S.
- Listed height: 6 ft 3 in (1.91 m)
- Listed weight: 250 lb (113 kg)

Career information
- High school: Wilson (Dallas, Texas)
- College: Texas
- NFL draft: 2010: 2nd round, 43rd overall pick

Career history
- Baltimore Ravens (2010–2012)

Awards and highlights
- Super Bowl champion (XLVII); First-team All-American (2009); 3× First-team All-Big 12 (2007–2009)

Career NFL statistics
- Total tackles: 1
- Stats at Pro Football Reference

Sergio Valent'e Kindle (born September 20, 1987) is an American former professional football player who was a linebacker in the National Football League (NFL). He played college football for the Texas Longhorns, and was the first player ever to be a finalist for both the Butkus Award and the Ted Hendricks Award. He was selected by the Ravens in the second round of the 2010 NFL draft.

== Early life ==
Kindle was coached by Bobby Estes at Woodrow Wilson High School in Dallas, Texas. Playing offense and defense, he excelled at running back and linebacker, rushing for 5,627 yards and 86 touchdowns.

Kindle was also the only player in Texas to boast all-state honors on both offense and defense in 2005. He was also named first-team All-American by USA Today as well as a PARADE All-America selection and Parade Player of the Year finalist. After his senior season, Kindle was invited to play in the 2006 U.S. Army All-American Bowl.

Regarded as a five-star recruit by Rivals.com, Kindle was ranked as the No. 1 inside linebacker prospect in the class of 2006. and was considered the best linebacker prospect from the Dallas area since Dallas Carter's Jessie Armstead in 1989.

Kindle also played basketball as Woodrow Wilson High's starting center in addition to running the 400m, 4×400-meter relay and competing in the long jump.

== College career ==
After missing the first two games of the 2006 Longhorn football season with an ankle injury, Kindle appeared in 11 games at strongside linebacker and on special teams. He registered 21 tackles, three tackles for losses and ranked third on the team in special teams tackles with eight.

Over the summer prior to the 2007 season, Kindle and his teammate Henry Melton were arrested in separate incidents on charges of driving while intoxicated. Both players were suspended from the first three games of the season, were also required to perform community service and missed the first two days of practice in order to visit with a woman whose son was crippled by a drunk driver.

In his junior season, Kindle started 11 of the 13 games he appeared in, playing linebacker, defensive end and on special teams. He posted 53 tackles, 10 sacks, 14 TFL, 15 pressures, two PBU, a forced fumble and two fumble recoveries. His performances helped the Longhorns defense rank first in the Big 12 and 18th nationally in terms of points per game and earned Kindle a 2008 All-American honorable mention by Sports Illustrated, as well as first-team All-Big 12 honors by the league's coaches, Austin American-Statesman, Kansas City Star and San Antonio Express-News and second-team All-Big 12 honors by Associated Press, Dallas Morning News, Fort Worth Star-Telegram and Waco Tribune-Herald.

For the 2009 season, Kindle was moved to the defensive end position, replacing Brian Orakpo who was drafted by the Washington Redskins in the 2009 NFL draft. He was named to the watch lists for the Nagurski Trophy, Bednarik Award and Hendricks Award. During the regular season, Kindle compiled 47 tackles, 3 sacks, 17 TFLs, and 31 QB Hurries.

In the 2010 BCS National Championship Game versus Alabama, Kindle recorded 6 solo tackles and 2.5 sacks.

== Professional career ==
=== Pre-draft ===
In a poll conducted by the Milwaukee Journal-Sentinel among 17 NFL scouts, Kindle was voted first among 3–4 outside linebackers, capturing 11 first-place votes (comparing to four firsts for the second-placed Jerry Hughes).

Pre-draft measurables
Height	Weight	Arm length	Hand span	40-yard dash	10-yard split	20-yard split	20-yard shuttle	Three-cone drill	Vertical jump	Broad jump	Bench press
6 2 7/8	250 lb (113 kg)	33 1/4	10 in (0.25 m)	4.65 s	1.65 s	2.69 s	4.53 s	7.26 s	36 1/2	9 ft 10 in (3.00 m)	25 reps
All values from NFL Combine

=== Baltimore Ravens ===
==== 2010 season ====
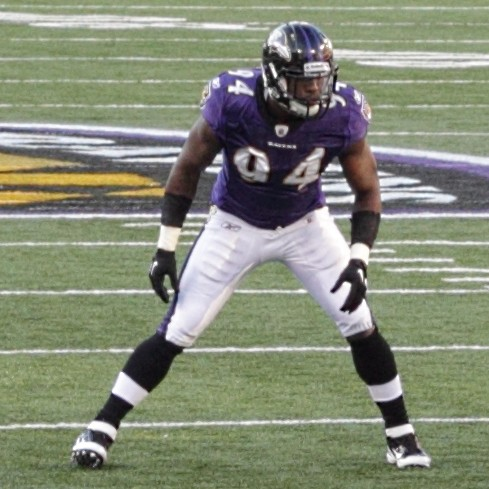
Sergio Kindle at M&T Bank Stadium in December 2011

"Kindle is entering an ideal situation. He joins a talented, veteran-laden defense where expectations will be low, and he’ll have the chance to learn from players like Suggs and Lewis."

— Pro Football Weekly′s Mike Wilkening.

Although deemed a first-round talent by most analysts, many teams were scared off by Kindle's often-injured knee and his off-the-field incidents. Kindle fell into the second round and was ultimately drafted 43rd overall by the Baltimore Ravens, using one of the three picks the Ravens acquired by trading their first-round pick (25th overall) to the Denver Broncos (who selected Tim Tebow). Kindle said in a press conference shortly after the draft he was targeting the Defensive Rookie of the Year Award in 2010. However, after the Ravens' minicamp, Kindle acknowledged: "When I said that, it was just an exciting moment for me, getting drafted. My head was in the clouds."

On July 25, Kindle fell down two flights of stairs at a home in Austin, Texas. He was sent to the hospital in stable condition but was described as suffering head trauma. It was later determined he fractured his skull in the fall. As a result, Kindle was unable to attend the Ravens' training camp at McDaniel College.

On September 23, 2010, Kindle signed a one-year contract for $320,000, the rookie minimum, and was immediately placed on the Reserve/Non-Football Injury list. Because Kindle did not sign until Week 3 of the 2010 season, Kindle received a prorated salary of $282,000. The contract included no signing bonus (by comparison, New England Patriots tight end Rob Gronkowski, the player drafted just before Kindle, received a signing bonus of $1.76 million).

==== 2011 season ====
Eighteen months after he was drafted, Kindle was activated for the first time in his career for the Ravens' Week 4 game against the New York Jets. He played primarily on special teams, but saw some time on defense towards the end of the game.

==== 2012 season ====
On October 20, 2012, the Ravens waived Kindle to make room for outside linebacker Terrell Suggs, who had spent the first six weeks on the Physically Unable to Perform (PUP) list. On October 22, 2012, Kindle was signed to the Ravens practice squad. On January 7, 2013, he was released from the team. Though he'd been waived by the time the game was played, as a member of the team for part of the season he was awarded a Super Bowl ring when the Ravens won Super Bowl XLVII.

== Personal life ==
Kindle was born in Los Angeles and moved to Texas shortly after he was born. His father played semi-pro football in Dallas, Texas.

On July 28, 2007, at 2:35 am, Kindle was pulled over for failing to stay in a single-marked lane near downtown Austin, Texas. After failing a field sobriety test, Kindle was arrested and charged with a DWI. Kindle was 19 years old at the time. Although he was sentenced to three days in jail, he served no jail time.

On December 26, 2010, Kindle was arrested for drunk driving at 4:09 am in Howard County, Maryland. Testing revealed that he had a blood-alcohol concentration of 0.17 percent, which is more than twice the legal limit in Maryland of 0.08. He was released from custody after posting a bond of $10,000. Following his second arrest, Kindle spent five days at an alcohol abuse in-patient treatment facility. Judge Neil Edward Axel, Howard County's drug and DUI court supervisor, waived both the mandatory $1,000 fine and the mandatory five-day jail sentence.

On September 16, 2011, Kindle was sued in Davidson County (TN) Circuit Court by U.S. Bank for $130,000, over non-payment of loans from the bank's music and entertainment division, which is based in Nashville. It is reported that the bank planned to have Kindle served with a subpoena during the Ravens' trip that weekend to Nashville, to play the Tennessee Titans.

After football, Kindle worked a series of jobs including selling cars, managing warehouses and driving. In 2023 he returned to football as a high school football coach. He spent a season as the linebacker coach at Woodrow Wilson High School in Dallas and then became the Defensive Coordinator at Hillcrest High School, also in Dallas.
