= Lyle Leong =

American gridiron football player (born 1987)

No. 13
- Position: Wide receiver

Personal information
- Born: August 23, 1987 (age 39); Abilene, Texas, U.S.
- Listed height: 6 ft 1 in (1.85 m)
- Listed weight: 175 lb (79 kg)

Career information
- High school: Abilene
- College: Texas Tech
- NFL draft: 2011: undrafted

Career history
- Dallas Cowboys (2011)*; Saskatchewan Roughriders (2013)*; Hamilton Tiger-Cats (2013)
- * Offseason or practice squad member only

Awards and highlights
- Second-team All-Big 12 (2010)
- Stats at CFL.ca (archive)

Lyle Leong (born August 23, 1987) is an American former professional football wide receiver. He played college football for the Texas Tech Red Raiders.

== Professional career ==
=== Dallas Cowboys ===
Lyle Leong went undrafted in the 2011 NFL draft. He was signed by the Dallas Cowboys as an undrafted free agent in 2011.

=== Saskatchewan Roughriders ===
Signed with the Saskatchewan Roughriders of the Canadian Football League in February 2013.

=== Hamilton Tiger-Cats ===
On May 23, 2013, Leong Jr was traded to the Hamilton Tiger-Cats of the CFL in exchange for Jermaine McElveen.

== Coaching career ==
=== Levelland High School ===
On June 9, 2021, Lyle Leong was named Head Football Coach and athletic director of the Levelland Lobos by the Levelland Independent School District Board of Trustees.
