= Detron Lewis =

American football player (born 1989)

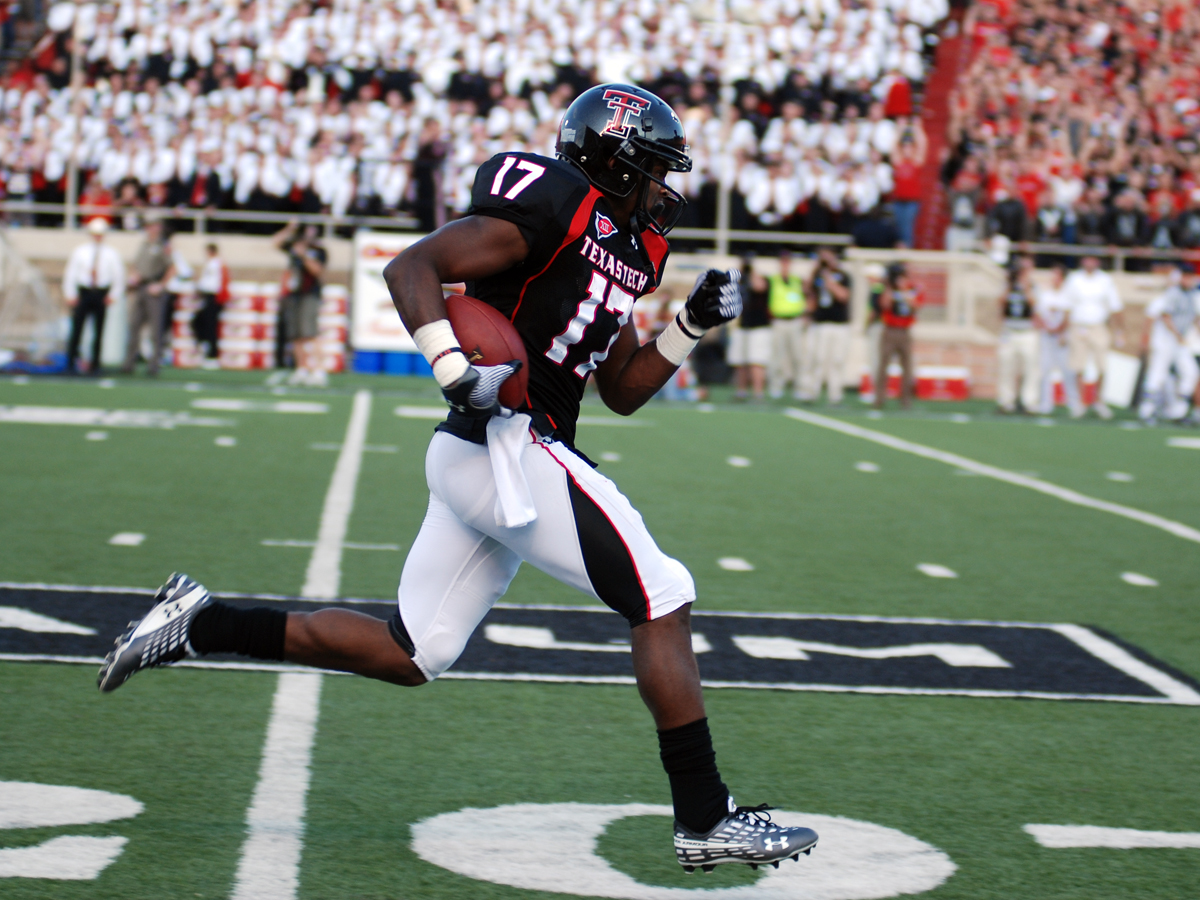
- Lewis running for a 49-yard touchdown during the North Dakota game in 2009

No. 17
- Position: Wide receiver

Personal information
- Born: August 20, 1989 (age 37); College Station, Texas, U.S.
- Listed height: 6 ft 0 in (1.83 m)
- Listed weight: 208 lb (94 kg)

Career information
- High school: College Station (TX) A&M Consolidated
- College: Texas Tech
- NFL draft: 2011: undrafted

Career history
- Tampa Bay Buccaneers (2011)*
- * Offseason or practice squad member only
- Stats at Pro Football Reference

Detron Lewis (born August 20, 1989) is an American former football wide receiver. He was signed by the Tampa Bay Buccaneers as an undrafted free agent in 2011. He played college football at Texas Tech.

== College career ==
He had 55 catches for 730 yard and 5 touchdowns as a junior in 2009. In 2008, he had 76 catches for 913 yards and 3 touchdowns. As a freshman, he had 10 catches for 120 yards and 3 touchdowns. Lewis is from College Station, Texas. He attended A&M Consolidated High School where he played football and was selected as a unanimous first-team All-District 13-5A.

== Professional career ==
=== Tampa Bay Buccaneers ===
Lewis was signed by the Tampa Bay Buccaneers as an undrafted free agent on July 27, 2011. He was waived on August 29.
