= Baron Batch =

American football player (born 1987)

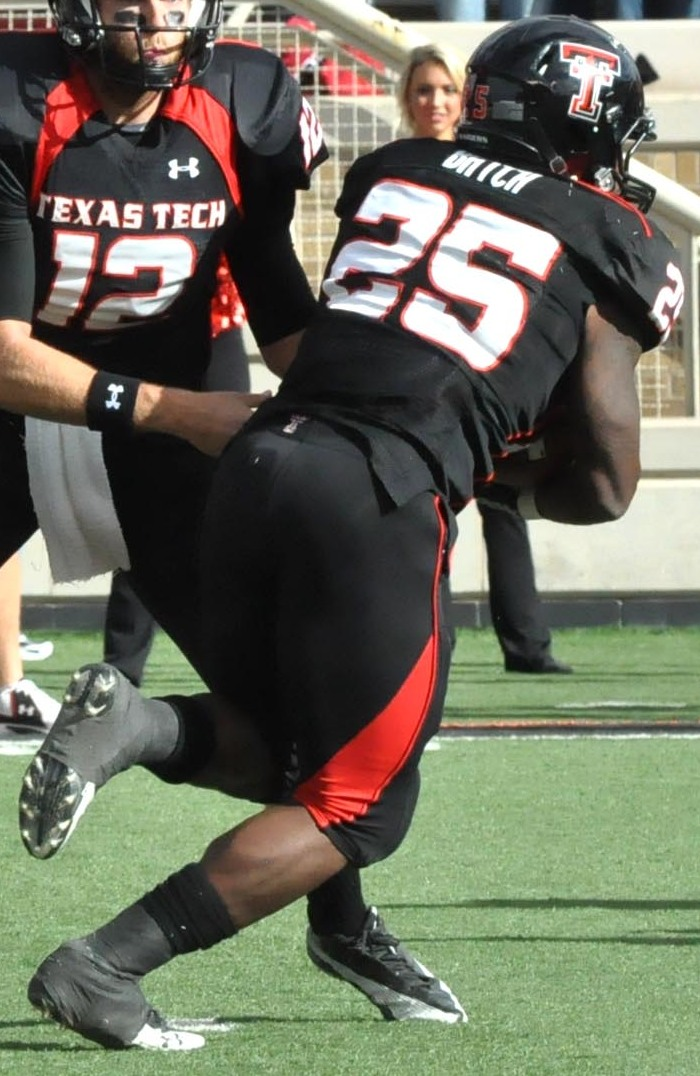
- Batch with the Texas Tech Red Raiders in 2010

No. 35, 20
- Position: Running back

Personal information
- Born: December 21, 1987 (age 38); Odessa, Texas, U.S.
- Listed height: 5 ft 10 in (1.78 m)
- Listed weight: 210 lb (95 kg)

Career information
- High school: Midland (TX)
- College: Texas Tech
- NFL draft: 2011: 7th round, 232nd overall pick

Career history
- Pittsburgh Steelers (2011−2012)

Career NFL statistics
- Rushing attempts: 25
- Rushing yards: 49
- Rushing touchdowns: 1
- Receptions: 4
- Receiving yards: 31
- Stats at Pro Football Reference

Baron Vaun Batch (born December 21, 1987), self-styled "the Artist", is an American Pittsburgh-based entrepreneur and former professional football running back who played for the Pittsburgh Steelers of the National Football League (NFL). He played college football at Texas Tech University.

== Early life ==
Batch is from Midland, Texas. He is the brother of Brian Batch of the band Alpha Rev.

== College career ==
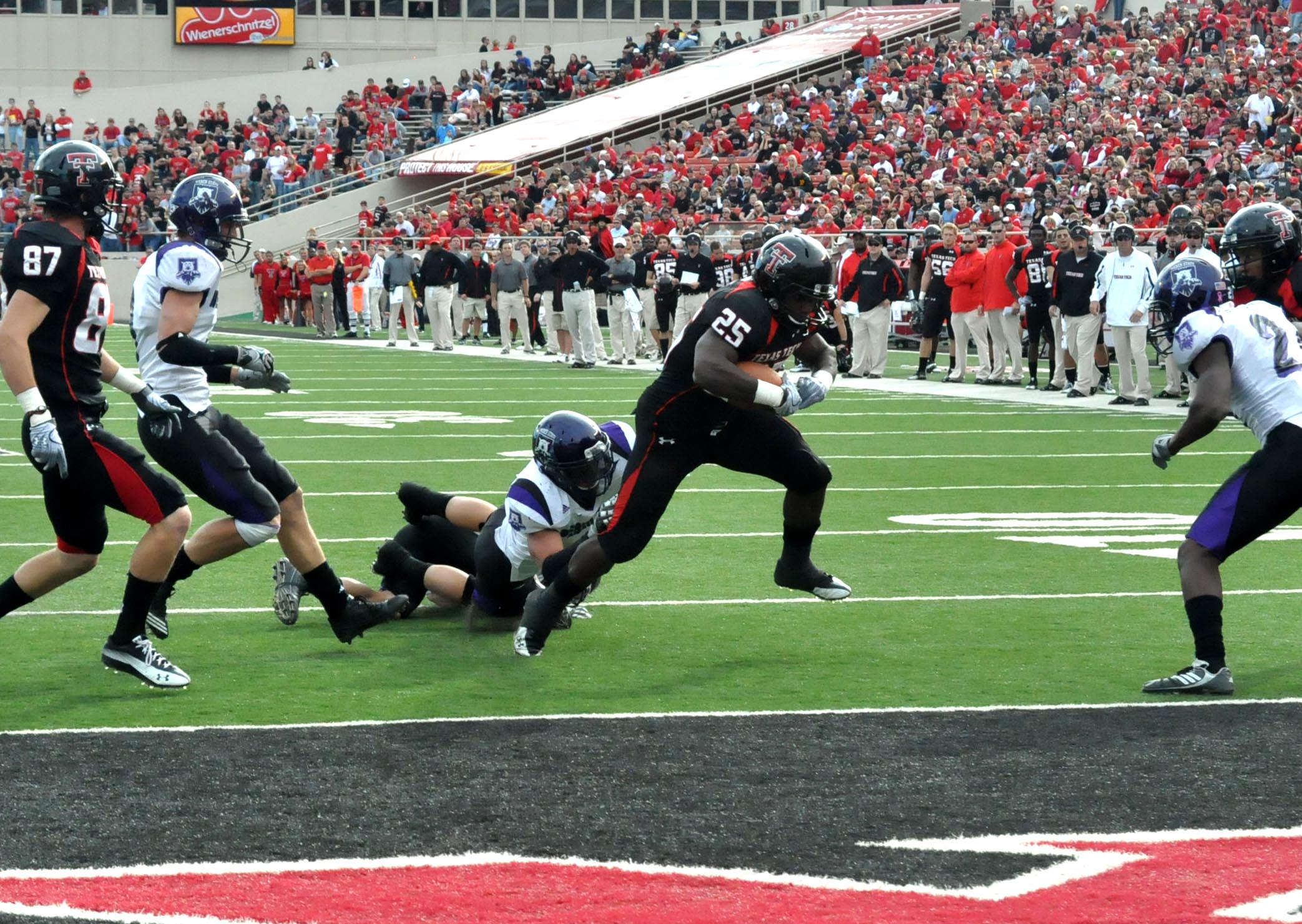
Batch scores a touchdown for Texas Tech in their 2010 win over Weber State

Batch chose to play college football at Texas Tech University over offers from Northwestern University, Duke University, and New Mexico State University.

Batch finished his collegiate career at Tech as the school's eighth-ranked all-time leader in rushing with 2,501 yards. During his senior season at Texas Tech, Batch led the team in rushing with 816 yards on 177 carries, an average of 4.20 yards per carry. He also caught 32 passes for 226 yards and three receiving touchdowns. In 2009, as a junior, he rushed 146 times for 784 yards and 12 touchdowns, along with 51 receptions for 310 yards and one touchdown. In the Alamo Bowl against Michigan State following his junior year, he had 99 yards on 22 rushes for two touchdowns and six receptions for 85 yards. As a sophomore Batch rushed 113 times for 758 yards and seven touchdowns. He also caught 45 passes for 449 yards and a touchdown.

== Professional career ==
Pre-draft measurables
| Height | Weight | Arm length | Hand span | 40-yard dash | 10-yard split | 20-yard split | 20-yard shuttle | Three-cone drill | Vertical jump | Broad jump | Bench press |
|---|---|---|---|---|---|---|---|---|---|---|---|
| 5 ft 9 5/8 in (1.77 m) | 207 lb (94 kg) | 31 3/4 in (0.81 m) | 9 1/4 in (0.23 m) | 4.50 s | 1.50 s | 2.61 s | 4.32 s | 7.03 s | 39.0 in (0.99 m) | 10 ft 6 in (3.20 m) | 24 reps |
All values from Pro Day

Batch was selected in the seventh round, 232nd overall, of the 2011 NFL draft by the Pittsburgh Steelers. He was figured to be in competition to replace Mewelde Moore as the third-down back, given his receiving and blocking experience in Mike Leach's Air Raid offense at Texas Tech. However, Batch tore his ACL during a training camp practice on August 11, 2011, and was out for the season. He was officially placed on injured reserve on August 28.

On Thursday October 11, 2012, Baron ran for 22 yards on 10 attempts against the Tennessee Titans. This was his first game with more than five rushing attempts in the NFL. He was released by the Pittsburgh Steelers on November 20, 2012, to make a necessary roster move, but was picked back up to be on the practice squad the next day. A week later, he was resigned to the 53-man roster. On August 25, 2013, he was cut by the Steelers and retired from professional football.

== The Artist ==
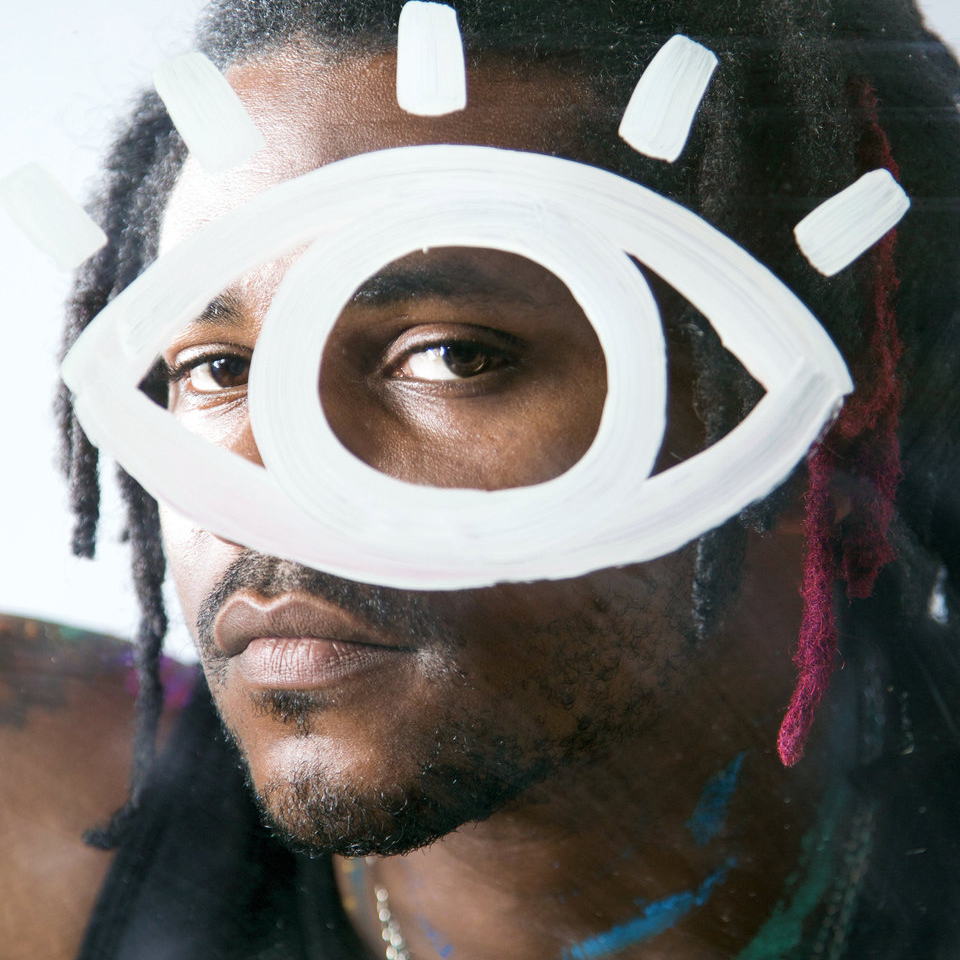
Batch

Batch is an artist based out of Pittsburgh, where he is creative director of the event space, art gallery, and creative agency Studio AM, where he and other creatives collaborate. Batch self-describes his art as POP-X genre of art, a mix of Pop Art and Expressionism reminiscent of street-art styles developed in the '70s and '80s. He is formerly the owner and creator of Angry Man Salsa, a high-end dipping salsa available online in limited editions. Batch admitted to painting graffiti along the bike trail from Hot Metal Bridge to Sandcastle.

Batch was described as a "Creative Force" in Whirl magazine and has labeled himself "The Artist". His artwork is a major staple of the Pittsburgh Yoga scene.

In April 2013, Baron Batch was chosen as the featured artist at the 35th annual Lubbock Arts Festival. His work was displayed at the Lubbock Memorial Civic Center from April 12–14.

An arrest warrant was issued by the Pittsburgh Police for 30 counts of criminal mischief involving graffiti. In May 2017, he was given an 18-month suspended sentence and community service.
