= Matt Williams (American football) =

American football player (born 1987)

No. 85
- Position: Placekicker

Personal information
- Born: December 14, 1987 (age 37); Weatherford, Texas, U.S.
- Listed height: 5 ft 11 in (1.80 m)
- Listed weight: 180 lb (82 kg)

Career information
- High school: Weatherford (TX)
- College: Texas Tech (2008–2010)

Matt Williams (born December 14, 1987) is an American former football player who was a kicker for the Texas Tech Red Raiders. He was offered the position to replace two struggling kickers on the roster in 2008.

== Early life ==
Williams attended Weatherford High School in Weatherford, Texas, where he played soccer and football. In football, he played both wide receiver and kicker. His signature moment as a kicker occurred when he kicked a 49-yard field goal through the uprights to defeat rival Mineral Wells High School in overtime. He graduated from Weatherford in 2006.

== College career ==
=== Tarleton State ===
Williams walked on to the Tarleton State Texans football team, though was only on the team for a month and never played a game.

=== Texas Tech ===
After two years at Tarleton State, Williams transferred to Texas Tech. During halftime of Tech's September 20, 2008, football game against the University of Massachusetts, Williams entered a promotional contest in which he made a 30-yard field goal. He caught the attention of head coach Mike Leach, who liked the fundamentals he used on the kick. Leach wanted him on the team, and although it was initially thought he would not be immediately eligible, the NCAA granted a one-time exception based on the specific circumstances. He was allowed to play immediately as he had not been recruited by Tarleton State and also because he was never a scholarship player. However, the season he played on Tarleton State's squad counted toward his eligibility, making him a sophomore during his first year at Tech. He also had to reject the free rent he won in the contest in order to remain eligible.

Williams made his debut in a 63–21 win over Kansas where he converted on all nine extra point attempts. Following the game, Williams was recognized as the AT&T ESPN All-America Player of the Week.

The following week, in Texas Tech's 39–33 victory over Texas, Williams was also asked to kick field goals, making two and having one blocked.

In 2009, Williams made a career long 43-yard Field Goal against Baylor University in a 20–13 victory.

Williams finished his career 149–150 on extra points and 22–28 (78.6%) on field goals. As of November 2025, he is 5th on the Red Raiders kickers scoring list with 215 career points. He graduated in 2010.

== Post-football career ==
Matthew Williams currently works at Weatherford High school, Weatherford, TX, as a coach for boys football and girls soccer. He also teaches U.S. History and World History.
