= Texas Tech Red Raiders football statistical leaders =

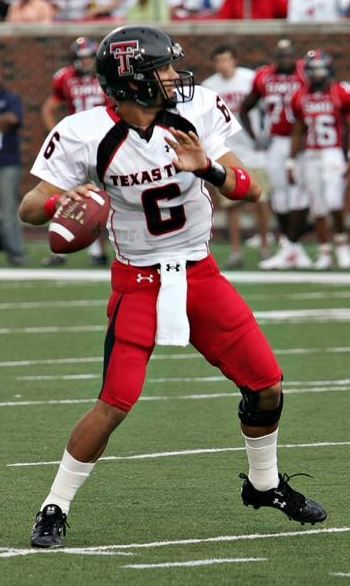
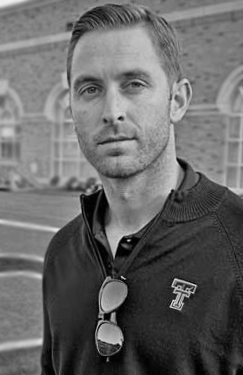
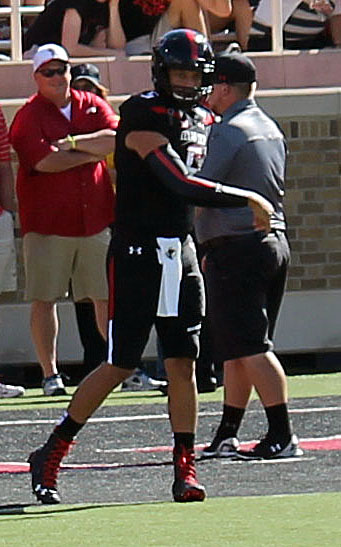
Graham Harrell (left), Kliff Kingsbury (center), Patrick Mahomes (right) are 1st, 2nd, and 3rd in career passing yards and career passing touchdowns.

The Texas Tech Red Raiders football statistical leaders are individual statistical leaders of the Texas Tech Red Raiders football program in various categories, including passing, rushing, receiving, total offense, defensive stats, and kicking. Within those areas, the lists identify single-game, single-season and career leaders. The Red Raiders represent Texas Tech University in the NCAA Division I FBS Big 12 Conference.

Texas Tech began competing in intercollegiate football in 1925. These lists are dominated by more recent players for several reasons:

- Since 1950, seasons have increased from 9 games to 10, 11 and then 12 games in length.
- The NCAA didn't allow freshmen to play varsity football until 1972 (with the exception of the World War II years), allowing players to have four-year careers.
- Bowl games only began counting toward single-season and career statistics in 2002. The Red Raiders have played in a bowl game in all but two seasons since 2002.
- The Big 12 has held a championship game from 1996–2010 and since 2017. Texas Tech played in (and won) the 2025 edition.
- Since 2018, players have been allowed to participate in as many as four games in a redshirt season; previously, playing in even one game "burned" the redshirt. Since 2024, postseason games have not counted against the four-game limit. These changes to redshirt rules have given very recent players several extra games to accumulate statistics.
- Due to COVID-19 disruptions, the NCAA did not count the 2020 season against the eligibility of any football player, giving all players active in that season five years of eligibility instead of the normal four.
- Since 2000, the Red Raiders have run a high-octane air raid offense, most notably under head coaches Mike Leach, Tommy Tuberville, Kliff Kingsbury, and currently Joey McGuire. The passing and receiving lists are dominated by players from this era, although the rushing lists are not.

The statistics below are updated through the 2025 Big 12 Championship Game. Players active for Tech in 2025 are in bold.

== Passing ==
=== Passing yards ===
Career
Rank	Player	Yards	Years
1	Graham Harrell	15,793	2005 2006 2007 2008
2	Kliff Kingsbury	12,429	1999 2000 2001 2002
3	Patrick Mahomes	11,252	2014 2015 2016
4	**Behren Morton**	8,989	2021 2022 2023 2024 2025
5	Seth Doege	8,636	2009 2010 2011 2012
6	Robert Hall	7,908	1990 1991 1992 1993
7	Taylor Potts	7,835	2007 2008 2009 2010
8	Zebbie Lethridge	6,789	1994 1995 1996 1997
9	Billy Joe Tolliver	6,756	1985 1986 1987 1988
10	B. J. Symons	6,378	2000 2001 2002 2003

Single season
Rank	Player	Yards	Year
1	B. J. Symons	5,833	2003
2	Graham Harrell	5,705	2007
3	Graham Harrell	5,111	2008
4	Patrick Mahomes	5,052	2016
5	Kliff Kingsbury	5,017	2002
6	Sonny Cumbie	4,742	2004
7	Patrick Mahomes	4,653	2015
8	Graham Harrell	4,555	2006
9	Cody Hodges	4,238	2005
10	Seth Doege	4,215	2012

Single game
Rank	Player	Yards	Year	Opponent
1	Patrick Mahomes	734	2016	Oklahoma
2	B. J. Symons	661	2003	Ole Miss
3	Graham Harrell	646	2007	Oklahoma State
4	Cody Hodges	643	2005	Kansas State
5	Alan Bowman	605	2018	Houston
6	Patrick Mahomes	598	2014	Baylor
7	B. J. Symons	586	2003	N.C. State
	Patrick Mahomes	586	2016	Baylor
9	B. J. Symons	552	2003	Oklahoma State
10	Nic Shimonek	543	2017	Arizona State

=== Passing touchdowns ===
Career
Rank	Player	TDs	Years
1	Graham Harrell	134	2005 2006 2007 2008
2	Kliff Kingsbury	95	1999 2000 2001 2002
3	Patrick Mahomes	93	2014 2015 2016
4	**Behren Morton**	71	2021 2022 2023 2024 2025
5	Seth Doege	69	2009 2010 2011 2012
6	Taylor Potts	62	2007 2008 2009 2010
7	B. J. Symons	59	2000 2001 2002 2003
8	Robert Hall	48	1990 1991 1992 1993
9	Davis Webb	46	2013 2014 2015
10	Zebbie Lethridge	42	1994 1995 1996 1997

Single season
Rank	Player	TDs	Year
1	B. J. Symons	52	2003
2	Graham Harrell	48	2007
3	Kliff Kingsbury	45	2002
	Graham Harrell	45	2008
5	Patrick Mahomes	41	2016
6	Seth Doege	39	2012
7	Graham Harrell	38	2006
8	Patrick Mahomes	36	2015
9	Taylor Potts	35	2010
10	Nic Shimonek	33	2017

Single game
Rank	Player	TDs	Year	Opponent
1	B. J. Symons	8	2003	Texas A&M
2	B. J. Symons	7	2003	Baylor
	Taylor Potts	7	2008	Rice
	Steven Sheffield	7	2009	Kansas State
	Seth Doege	7	2012	TCU
6	11 times by 6 players	6	Most recent: Patrick Mahomes, 2016 vs. Baylor	

== Rushing ==
=== Rushing yards ===
Career
Rank	Player	Yards	Years
1	Tahj Brooks	4,560	2020 2021 2022 2023 2024
2	Byron Hanspard	4,219	1994 1995 1996
3	James Gray	4,066	1986 1987 1988 1989
4	Ricky A. Williams	3,661	1998 1999 2000 2001
5	Byron Morris	3,544	1991 1992 1993
6	DeAndré Washington	3,411	2011 2013 2014 2015
7	Taurean Henderson	3,241	2002 2003 2004 2005
8	James Hadnot	2,794	1976 1977 1978 1979
9	SaRodorick Thompson	2,664	2018 2019 2020 2021 2022
10	Larry Isaac	2,633	1973 1974 1975 1976

Single season
Rank	Player	Yards	Year
1	Byron Hanspard	2,084	1996
2	Byron Morris	1,752	1993
3	Ricky A. Williams	1,582	1998
4	Tahj Brooks	1,541	2023
5	James Gray	1,509	1989
6	Tahj Brooks	1,505	2024
7	DeAndré Washington	1,492	2015
8	Byron Hanspard	1,374	1995
9	James Hadnot	1,371	1979
10	James Hadnot	1,369	1978

Single game
Rank	Player	Yards	Year	Opponent
1	Byron Hanspard	287	1996	Baylor
2	James Gray	280	1989	Duke
3	Byron Hanspard	272	1996	Oklahoma State
4	James Hadnot	268	1978	New Mexico
5	Cameron Dickey	263	2025	Kansas
6	Byron Hanspard	260	1995	Air Force
7	Ricky A. Williams	251	1998	UTEP
8	DeAndré Washington	248	2015	Kansas State
9	Byron Hanspard	247	1996	Southwestern Louisiana
10	Ricky A. Williams	244	1998	Fresno State

=== Rushing touchdowns ===
Career
Rank	Player	TDs	Years
1	Taurean Henderson	50	2002 2003 2004 2005
2	James Gray	45	1986 1987 1988 1989
	Tahj Brooks	45	2020 2021 2022 2023 2024
4	SaRodorick Thompson	40	2018 2019 2020 2021 2022
5	Byron Morris	37	1991 1992 1993
6	Ricky A. Williams	36	1998 1999 2000 2001
7	Shannon Woods	33	2005 2006 2007 2008
8	Bobby Cavazos	32	1951 1952 1953
9	Billy Taylor	29	1974 1975 1976 1977
	Byron Hanspard	29	1994 1995 1996

Single season
Rank	Player	TDs	Year
1	Byron Morris	22	1993
2	James Gray	20	1989
3	Donny Anderson	17	1965
	Taurean Henderson	17	2005
	Tahj Brooks	17	2024
6	Taurean Henderson	16	2004
7	DeAndré Washington	14	2015
	Cameron Dickey	14	2025
	DeAndré Washington	14	2015
	Barron Batch	14	2009

Single game
Rank	Player	TDs	Year	Opponent
1	Billy Taylor	5	1977	TCU
2	10 times by 8 players	4	Most recent: Ta’Zhawn Henry, 2018 vs. Houston	

== Receiving ==
=== Receptions ===
Career
Rank	Player	Rec	Years
1	Taurean Henderson	303	2002 2003 2004 2005
2	Wes Welker	259	2000 2001 2002 2003
3	Eric Ward	255	2010 2011 2012 2013
4	Jakeem Grant	254	2012 2013 2014 2015
5	Detron Lewis	238	2007 2008 2009 2010
6	Michael Crabtree	231	2007 2008
6	Nehemiah Glover	223	2001 2002 2003 2004
8	Carlos Francis	216	2000 2001 2002 2003
9	Danny Amendola	204	2004 2005 2006 2007
10	Jarrett Hicks	198	2003 2004 2005 2006

Single season
Rank	Player	Rec	Year
1	Michael Crabtree	134	2007
2	Danny Amendola	109	2007
3	Jace Amaro	106	2013
4	Taurean Henderson	98	2002
5	Wes Welker	97	2003
	Michael Crabtree	97	2008
7	Keke Coutee	93	2013
8	Ricky A. Williams	92	2001
	Darrin More	92	2012
10	Joel Filani	91	2006

Single game
Rank	Player	Rec	Year	Opponent
1	Eric Ward	16	2011	Baylor
2	Robert Johnson	15	2006	SMU
	Michael Crabtree	15	2007	UTEP
	Jace Amaro	15	2013	Oklahoma State
5	Wes Welker	14	2002	Texas
	Danny Amendola	14	2007	Oklahoma State
	Michael Crabtree	14	2007	Oklahoma State
8	8 times by 8 players	13	Most recent: Myles Price, 2022 vs. Texas	

=== Receiving yards ===
Career
Rank	Player	Yards	Years
1	Jakeem Grant	3,286	2012 2013 2014 2015
2	Michael Crabtree	3,127	2007 2008
3	Wes Welker	3,069	2000 2001 2002 2003
4	Lloyd Hill	3,059	1990 1991 1992 1993
5	Carlos Francis	3,031	2000 2001 2002 2003
6	Eric Ward	2,863	2010 2011 2012 2013
7	Jarrett Hicks	2,859	2003 2004 2005 2006
8	Detron Lewis	2,729	2007 2008 2009 2010
9	Nehemiah Glover	2,725	2001 2002 2003 2004
10	Joel Filani	2,667	2003 2004 2005 2006

Single season
Rank	Player	Yards	Year
1	Michael Crabtree	1,962	2007
2	Keke Coutee	1,429	2017
3	Antoine Wesley	1,410	2018
4	Jace Amaro	1,352	2013
5	Joel Filani	1,300	2006
6	Jakeem Grant	1,268	2015
7	Lloyd Hill	1,261	1992
8	Danny Amendola	1,245	2007
9	Carlos Francis	1,177	2003
	Jarrett Hicks	1,177	2004

Single game
Rank	Player	Yards	Year	Opponent
1	Antoine Wesley	261	2018	Houston
2	Joel Filani	255	2005	Kansas State
3	Rodney Blackshear	251	1991	Houston
4	Leonard Harris	248	1983	Houston
5	Michael Crabtree	244	2007	Rice
6	Donnie Hart	241	1996	Texas
7	Michael Crabtree	237	2007	Oklahoma State
8	Carlos Francis	234	2000	Utah State
9	Danny Amendola	233	2007	Oklahoma State
10	Lloyd Hill	222	1992	Wyoming

=== Receiving touchdowns ===
Career
Rank	Player	TDs	Years
1	Michael Crabtree	41	2007 2008
2	Lyle Leong	32	2007 2008 2009 2010
3	Eric Ward	31	2010 2011 2012 2013
4	Jarrett Hicks	30	2003 2004 2005 2006
5	Jakeem Grant	27	2012 2013 2014 2015
6	Joel Filani	23	2003 2004 2005 2006
7	Darrin Moore	22	2000 2001 2002 2003
	Mickey Peters	22	2000 2001 2002 2003
9	Carlos Francis	21	2000 2001 2002 2003
	Wes Welker	21	2000 2001 2002 2003
	Nehemiah Glover	21	2001 2002 2003 2004
	T. J. Vasher	21	2017 2018 2019 2020

Single season
Rank	Player	TDs	Year
1	Michael Crabtree	22	2007
2	Michael Crabtree	19	2008
	Lyle Leong	19	2010
4	Jarrett Hicks	13	2004
	Joel Filani	13	2006
	Darrin More	13	2012
	Jonathan Giles	13	2016
8	Lloyd Hill	12	1992
	Mickey Peters	12	2003
	Eric Ward	12	2012

Single game
Rank	Player	TDs	Year	Opponent
1	Derek Dorris	4	2000	Kansas
2	37 times by 21 players	3	Most recent: **Caleb Douglas**, 2024 vs. Baylor	

== Total offense ==
Total offense is the sum of passing and rushing statistics. It does not include receiving or returns.

=== Total offense yards ===
Career
Rank	Player	Yards	Years
1	Graham Harrell	15,611	2005 2006 2007 2008
2	Kliff Kingsbury	12,263	1999 2000 2001 2002
3	Patrick Mahomes	12,097	2014 2015 2016
4	**Behren Morton**	8,951	2021 2022 2023 2024 2025
5	Seth Doege	8,700	2009 2010 2011 2012
6	Robert Hall	8,489	1990 1991 1992 1993
7	Zebbie Lethridge	7,690	1994 1995 1996 1997
8	Taylor Potts	7,653	2007 2008 2009 2010
9	B. J. Symons	6,586	2000 2001 2002 2003
10	Billy Joe Tolliver	6,475	1985 1986 1987 1988

Single season
Rank	Player	Yards	Year
1	B. J. Symons	5,976	2003
2	Graham Harrell	5,614	2007
3	Patrick Mahomes	5,337	2016
4	Patrick Mahomes	5,109	2015
5	Graham Harrell	5,096	2008
6	Kliff Kingsbury	4,903	2002
7	Sonny Cumbie	4,575	2004
8	Graham Harrell	4,489	2006
9	Cody Hodges	4,429	2005
10	Seth Doege	4,274	2012

Single game
Rank	Player	Yards	Year	Opponent
1	Patrick Mahomes	819	2016	Oklahoma
2	B. J. Symons	681	2003	Ole Miss
3	Graham Harrell	643	2007	Oklahoma State
4	Patrick Mahomes	625	2014	Baylor
5	B. J. Symons	618	2003	N.C. State
6	Cody Hodges	604	2005	Kansas State
7	Alan Bowman	602	2018	Houston
8	Patrick Mahomes	584	2016	Arizona State
9	Patrick Mahomes	580	2016	Baylor
10	Patrick Mahomes	540	2016	Stephen F. Austin

=== Touchdowns responsible for ===
"Touchdowns responsible for" is the NCAA's official term for combined passing and rushing touchdowns. Texas Tech uses this term in its official record book.

Career
Rank	Player	TDs	Years
1	Graham Harrell	146	2005 2006 2007 2008
2	Patrick Mahomes	115	2014 2015 2016
3	Kliff Kingsbury	100	1999 2000 2001 2002
4	**Behren Morton**	78	2021 2022 2023 2024 2025
5	Seth Doege	75	2009 2010 2011 2012
6	Zebbie Lethridge	71	1994 1995 1996 1997
7	Taylor Potts	66	2007 2008 2009 2010
8	B. J. Symons	61	2000 2001 2002 2003
9	Taurean Henderson	50	2002 2003 2004 2005
10	James Gray	45	1986 1987 1988 1989
	Tahj Brooks	45	2020 2021 2022 2023 2024

Single season
Rank	Player	TDs	Year
1	B. J. Symons	57	2003
2	Patrick Mahomes	53	2016
3	Graham Harrell	52	2007
4	Graham Harrell	51	2008
5	Kliff Kingsbury	47	2002
6	Patrick Mahomes	46	2015
7	Seth Doege	41	2012
	Graham Harrell	40	2006
8	Taylor Potts	37	2010
10	Sonny Cumbie	34	2004
	Cody Hodges	34	2005
	Nic Shimonek	34	2017

Single game
Rank	Player	TDs	Year	Opponent
1	B. J. Symons	8	2003	Texas A&M

== Defense ==
=== Interceptions ===
Career
Rank	Player	Ints	Years
1	Tracy Saul	25	1989 1990 1991 1992
2	Elmer Tarbox	17	1936 1937 1938
3	John Thompson	14	1951 1952 1953
	Tate Randle	14	1978 1979 1980 1981
5	Boyd Cowan	12	1985 1986 1987 1988
	Vincent Meeks	12	2002 2003 2004 2005
	Darcel McBath	12	2002 2003 2004 2005
8	Ryan Aycock	11	2000 2001 2002 2003
	Douglas Coleman III	11	2016 2017 2018 2019
10	Kevin Curtis	10	1998 1999 2000 2001
	Dadrion Taylor-Demerson	10	2019 2020 2021 2022 2023

Single season
Rank	Player	Ints	Year
1	Elmer Tarbox	11	1938
2	John Thompson	8	1951
	Tracy Saul	8	1989
	Tracy Saul	8	1991
	Douglas Coleman III	8	2019
6	Teddy Roberts	7	1964
7	Darcel McBath	7	2008
8	Elmer Tarbox	6	1937
	Tate Randle	6	1979
	Boyd Cowan	6	1987
	Bart Thomas	6	1994
	Ryan Aycock	6	2003

Single game
Rank	Player	Ints	Year	Opponent
1	Daniel Charbonnet	3	2008	SMU
	Darcel McBath	3	2008	Kansas

=== Tackles ===
Career
Rank	Player	Tackles	Years
1	Lawrence Flugence	500	1999 2000 2001 2002
2	Brad Hastings	480	1983 1984 1985 1986
3	Kevin Curtis	430	1998 1999 2000 2001
4	Michael Johnson	393	1984 1985 1986 1987
5	Zach Thomas	390	1992 1993 1994 1995
6	Matt Wingo	385	1988 1989 1990 1991
7	Shawn Banks	365	1992 1993 1994 1995
8	Cody Davis	362	2009 2010 2011 2012
9	Jordyn Brooks	346	2016 2017 2018 2019
10	Ryan Aycock	338	2000 2001 2002 2003

Single season
Rank	Player	Tackles	Year
1	Lawrence Flugence	193	2002
2	Brad Hastings	171	1985
3	Lawrence Flugence	156	2000
4	Michael Johnson	154	1987
5	Brad Hastings	153	1986
	Kevin Curtis	153	1999
7	Ryan Aycock	151	2002
8	Lawrence Flugence	145	2001
9	Brad Hastings	141	1984
	Donald Harris	141	1988
	James Mosley	141	1988

Single game
Rank	Player	Tackles	Year	Opponent
1	Donald Harris	30	1988	Arizona

=== Sacks ===
Career
Rank	Player	Sacks	Years
1	Aaron Hunt	34.0	1999 2000 2001 2002
2	Adell Duckett	28.0	2001 2002 2003 2004
3	Montae Reagor	25.5	1995 1996 1997 1998
4	Brandon Williams	22.5	2006 2007 2008
5	Pete Robertson	22.0	2011 2012 2013 2014 2015
6	Keyunta Dawson	19.5	2003 2004 2005 2006
7	Calvin Riggs	18.5	1983 1984 1985 1986
8	James Mosley	17.0	1985 1986 1987 1988
	Shawn Jackson	17.0	1991 1992 1993
10	Eli Howard	16.5	2017 2018 2019 2020

Single season
Rank	Player	Sacks	Year
1	Brandon Sharpe	15.0	2009
2	David Bailey	14.5	2025
3	Adell Duckett	14.0	2003
4	Brandon Williams	13.0	2008
5	Aaron Hunt	12.0	2001
	Pete Robertson	12.0	2014
7	Shawn Jackson	11.0	1992
8	Calvin Riggs	10.5	1986
	Montae Reagor	10.5	1997
10	Romello Height	10.0	2025

== Kicking ==
=== Field goals made ===
Career
Rank	Player	FGs	Years
1	Ryan Bustin	50	2012 2013 2014
	Clayton Hatfield	50	2015 2016 2017 2018
3	Alex Trlica	48	2004 2005 2006 2007
4	Bill Adams	43	1977 1978 1979
5	Trey Wolff	42	2019 2020 2022
6	Ricky Gann	41	1981 1982 1983 1984
	Scott Segrist	41	1985 1986 1987 1988
8	Lin Elliot	40	1988 1989 1990 1991
9	Jon Davis	35	1991 1992 1993 1994
	Chris Birkholz	35	1998 1999 2000 2001
	Gino Garcia	35	2022 2023 2024

Single season
Rank	Player	FGs	Year
1	Ryan Bustin	23	2013
2	**Stone Harrington**	22	2025
3	Trey Wolff	21	2022
4	Trey Wolff	20	2019
5	Gino Garcia	19	2024
6	Bill Adams	17	1979
	Ricky Gann	17	1984
	Lin Elliot	17	1991
	Ryan Bustin	17	2012
	Clayton Hatfield	17	2018

Single game
Rank	Player	FGs	Year	Opponent
1	**Stone Harrington**	5	2025	BYU (Note: This was the regularly scheduled game between the teams. They played a second time in the Big 12 championship game.)

=== Field goal percentage ===
Career
Rank	Player	FG%	Years
1	Jonathan Garibay	85.2%	2020 2021
2	Clayton Hatfield	84.7%	2015 2016 2017 2018
3	Gino Garcia	81.4%	2022 2023 2024
4	Trey Wolff	80.8%	2019 2020 2022
5	**Stone Harrington**	78.6%	2025
6	Ryan Bustin	76.9%	2012 2013 2014
7	Robert Treece	72.4%	2001 2002

Single season
Rank	Player	FG%	Year
1	Gino Garcia	95.0%	2024
2	Jonathan Garibay	93.8%	2021
3	Clayton Hatfield	92.9%	2016
4	Trey Wolff	90.9%	2019
5	Clayton Hatfield	89.5%	2018
6	Clayton Hatfield	87.5%	2015
7	Ryan Bustin	85.2%	2013
