= Houston Bowl =

Defunct American football college bowl game

Houston Bowl (defunct)
- EV1.net Houston Bowl
- Stadium: Reliant Stadium (2002–05); Astrodome (2000–01)
- Location: Houston, Texas
- Operated: 2000–05
- Conference tie-ins: Big 12 (2000-05); C-USA (2000–02)
- Payout: US$$750,000 (2000)
- Preceded by: Bluebonnet Bowl (1987)
- Succeeded by: Texas Bowl (2006)

Sponsors
- galleryfurniture.com (2000–01); EV1.net (2002–05)

Former names
- galleryfurniture.com Bowl (2000–01)

The Houston Bowl was an NCAA-sanctioned Division I-A college football bowl game that was played annually in Houston, Texas, from 2000 to 2005. For its first two years, the game was known as the galleryfurniture.com Bowl, named for the website of the sponsor, a Houston furniture chain operated by Jim McIngvale, better known as "Mattress Mack". In 2002, the Houston Bowl was born and later named the EV1.net Houston Bowl, after sponsor EV1.net, for the remainder of the game's existence.

== History ==
The Houston Bowl marked the return of bowl games to Houston for the first time since the final Bluebonnet Bowl in 1987. The bowl played in two locations during its tenure. For the 2000 and 2001 games, Houston's Astrodome was the venue. In 2002, the game moved to Reliant Stadium, the home of the NFL's Houston Texans.

The bowl initially had tie-ins with the Big 12 Conference and Conference USA. The Big 12 extended their commitment in 2002 and again in 2005. Big 12 teams played in each of the six bowls, compiling a 4–2 record.

After the 2005 game, the bowl failed to return EV1.net as a sponsor. Game management was turned over to the Texans, and the NFL Network changed the game's name to the Texas Bowl. While the 2006 playing of the Texas Bowl maintained continuity of having a Houston-based bowl game, NCAA records treat the Texas Bowl and Houston Bowl as separate games.

== Game results ==
Date	Winner		Loser		Notes
December 27, 2000	East Carolina	40	Texas Tech	27	notes
December 28, 2001	Texas A&M	28	TCU	9	notes
December 27, 2002	Oklahoma State	33	Southern Miss	23	notes
December 30, 2003	Texas Tech	38	Navy	14	notes
December 29, 2004	Colorado	33	UTEP	28	notes
December 31, 2005	No. 14 TCU	27	Iowa State	24	notes

== MVPs ==
Date played	MVPs	Team	Position
December 27, 2000	David Garrard	East Carolina	QB
December 27, 2000	Bernard Williams	East Carolina	DT
December 28, 2001	Byron Jones	Texas A&M	DB
December 28, 2001	Joe Weber	Texas A&M	RB
December 27, 2002	Rashaun Woods	Oklahoma State	WR
December 27, 2002	Kevin Williams	Oklahoma State	DT
December 30, 2003	B. J. Symons	Texas Tech	QB
December 30, 2003	Adell Duckett	Texas Tech	DL
December 29, 2004	Joel Klatt	Colorado	QB
December 29, 2004	Tom Hubbard	Colorado	S
December 31, 2005	Jeff Ballard	TCU	QB
December 31, 2005	Jason Berryman	Iowa State	DL

== Appearances by team ==
Rank	Team	Appearances	Record	Win %
T1	[[TCU Horned Frogs football|TCU]]	2	1–1	.500
T1	[[Texas Tech Red Raiders football|Texas Tech]]	2	1–1	.500
T2	[[Colorado Buffaloes football|Colorado]]	1	1–0	1.000
T2	[[East Carolina Pirates football|East Carolina]]	1	1–0	1.000
T2	[[Oklahoma State Cowboys football|Oklahoma State]]	1	1–0	1.000
T2	[[Texas A&M Aggies football|Texas A&M]]	1	1–0	1.000
T2	[[Iowa State Cyclones football|Iowa State]]	1	0–1	.000
T2	[[Navy Midshipmen football|Navy]]	1	0–1	.000
T2	[[Southern Miss Golden Eagles football|Southern Miss]]	1	0–1	.000
T2	[[UTEP Miners football|UTEP]]	1	0–1	.000

== Appearances by conference ==
Rank	Conference	Appearances	Record	Win %	# of Teams	Teams
1	Big 12	6	4–2	.667	5	Texas Tech (1–1) Colorado (1–0); Oklahoma State (1–0); Texas A&M (1–0); Iowa State (0–1)
2	C-USA	3	1–2	.333		East Carolina (1–0) Southern Miss (0–1); TCU (0–1)
T3	MWC	1	1–0	1.000		TCU (1–0)
T3	Independent	1	0–1	.000		Navy (0–1)
T3	WAC	1	0–1	.000		UTEP (0–1)
