= Craig Candeto =

American football player and coach (born 1982)

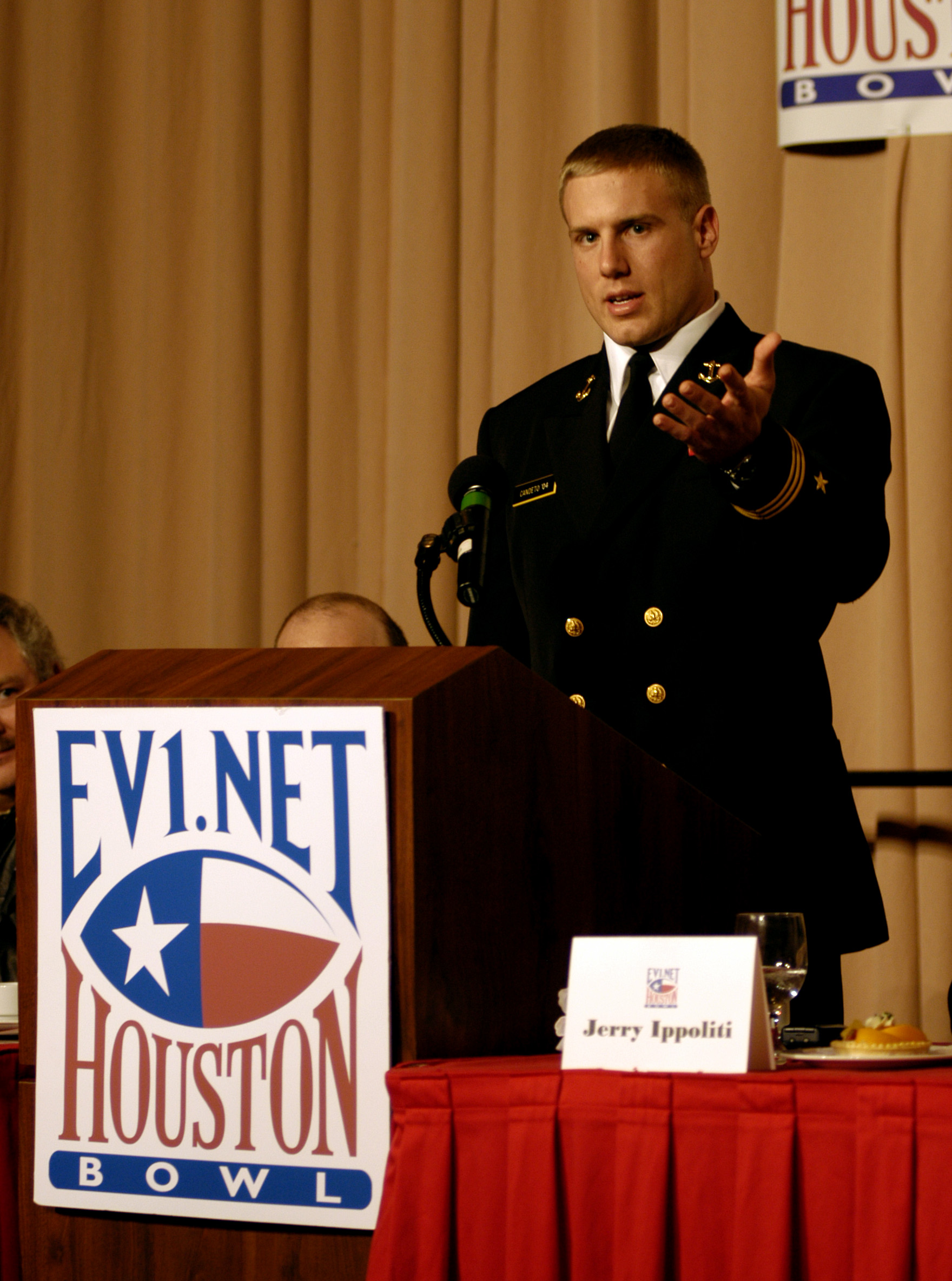
- Candeto speaks at a luncheon prior to the 2003 Houston Bowl

Biographical details
- Born: March 6, 1982 (age 44); Orange City, Florida, U.S.

Playing career
- 2000–2003: Navy
- Position: Quarterback

Coaching career (HC unless noted)
- 2009: Austin Peay (GA)
- 2010: Georgia Tech (GA)
- 2011–2012: Citadel (QB)
- 2013–2015: Capital
- 2016: Georgia Tech (assistant DFO)
- 2017–2018: Georgia Tech (QB)
- 2019–2020: Austin Peay (RB)

Head coaching record
- Overall: 10–20

Craig Candeto (born March 6, 1982) is an American football coach and former player. He was the running backs coach at Austin Peay State University. Candeto served as the head football coach at Capital University in Columbus, Ohio, from 2013 to 2015.

Candeto was a college quarterback at the United States Naval Academy in Annapolis, Maryland, under head coach Paul Johnson. He eventually worked under Johnson at Georgia Tech as quarterbacks coach.

== Early life ==
Candeto attended DeLand High School, where he was an all-state football and baseball player. As the football team's quarterback, he thrived in the option offense as he was named Class 5A Player of the Year during his senior season.

== College career ==
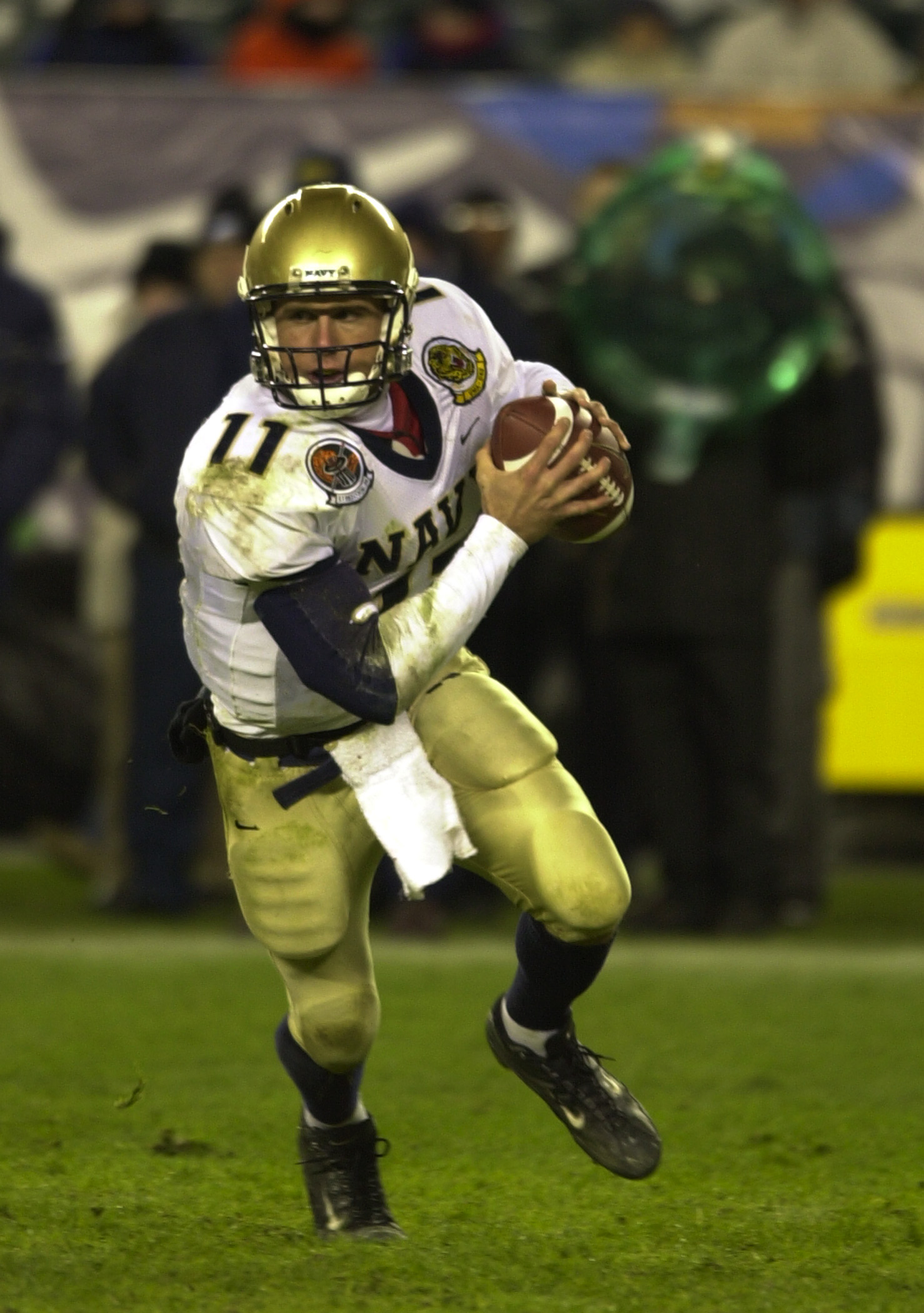
Candeto scrambles during the 2003 Army–Navy Game

After high school, Candeto was recruited by Paul Johnson at Georgia Southern, but chose to attend the United States Naval Academy. Although military service was initially not attractive for Candeto, the concept eventually appealed to him, while his uncle was also a United States Marine Corps veteran who served in the Gulf War. Georgia Tech also expressed interest in him, but did not want him to play baseball.

At the United States Naval Academy, Candeto played football and baseball, serving as a left fielder in the latter; the Midshipmen won the 2001 Patriot League baseball championship. In football, he started the 2001 opener against Temple, where he threw two touchdown passes as Navy lost 45–26. As Navy struggled to a winless 0–10 season, including a 70–7 defeat by Georgia Tech, he eventually spent the year as the backup quarterback behind Brian Madden.

Johnson was hired in 2002 and installed the flexbone triple option, a system that Candeto quickly adapted to. In that year's Army–Navy Game, he recorded 103 rushing yards and six touchdowns as Navy won 58–12. He ended the year with 775 rushing yards and a school single-season record 16 rushing touchdowns, along with 51 of 103 passes completed for 843 yards and five touchdowns.

During Candeto's senior year in 2003, he recorded 2,252 total yards (1,140 passing, 1,112 rushing) and 23 touchdowns (seven passing, 16 rushing).

After graduating from the Naval Academy in 2004, Candeto became a lieutenant in the United States Navy. During his five-year service, he was a fighter pilot, with his last assignment being with Strike Fighter Squadron 106 at Naval Air Station Oceana.

=== College football ===
| Year | Team | Games | | | Passing | | | | | | | | Rushing | | | |
| Year | Team | GP | GS | Record | Cmp | Att | Pct | Yds | Y/A | TD | Int | Rtg | Att | Yds | Avg | TD |
|---|---|---|---|---|---|---|---|---|---|---|---|---|---|---|---|---|
| 2000 | Navy | 5 | 0 | — | 12 | 27 | 44.4 | 128 | 4.7 | 0 | 1 | 76.9 | 21 | 46 | 2.2 | 1 |
| 2001 | Navy | 6 | 2 | 0–2 | 15 | 33 | 45.5 | 208 | 6.3 | 3 | 2 | 116.3 | 30 | 26 | 0.9 | 0 |
| 2002 | Navy | 11 | 11 | 2–9 | 51 | 103 | 49.5 | 843 | 8.2 | 5 | 4 | 126.5 | 177 | 775 | 4.4 | 16 |
| 2003 | Navy | 13 | 13 | 8–5 | 64 | 131 | 48.9 | 1,140 | 8.7 | 7 | 5 | 132.0 | 271 | 1,112 | 4.1 | 16 |
| Career | | 35 | 26 | 10–16 | 142 | 294 | 48.3 | 2,319 | 7.9 | 15 | 12 | 123.2 | 499 | 1,959 | 3.9 | 33 |

=== College baseball ===
| Season | Team | G | PA | AB | R | H | 2B | 3B | HR | RBI | SB | CS | BB | SO | BA |
|---|---|---|---|---|---|---|---|---|---|---|---|---|---|---|---|
| 2001 | Navy | 37 | 110 | 102 | 17 | 25 | 6 | 0 | 2 | 12 | 11 | 4 | 8 | 25 | .245 |
| 2002 | Navy | 43 | 168 | 146 | 23 | 31 | 3 | 1 | 4 | 13 | 12 | 5 | 8 | 23 | .212 |
| 2003 | Navy | 42 | 155 | 138 | 25 | 51 | 14 | 4 | 6 | 31 | 11 | 4 | 8 | 19 | .370 |
| 2004 | Navy | 50 | 210 | 196 | 29 | 54 | 7 | 3 | 3 | 19 | 20 | 5 | 12 | 30 | .276 |
| Career | | 172 | 643 | 582 | 94 | 161 | 30 | 8 | 15 | 75 | 54 | 18 | 36 | 97 | .277 |

== Coaching career ==
Candeto began coaching in 2009 as a graduate assistant for Austin Peay. The following year, he reunited with Johnson at Georgia Tech in the same capacity before moving to The Citadel in 2011 as the quarterbacks and B-backs coach.

From 2013 to 2015, he served as head coach at Capital University. In 2016, he rejoined Johnson at Georgia Tech as the quarterbacks coach.

In 2019, Candeto returned to Austin Peay as running backs coach, working under ex-Navy coach Mark Hudspeth.

== Head coaching record ==
| Year | Team | Overall | Conference | Standing | Bowl/playoffs |
|---|---|---|---|---|---|
Capital Crusaders (Ohio Athletic Conference) (2013–2015)
| 2013 | Capital | 3–7 | 3–6 | 7th | |
| 2014 | Capital | 3–7 | 2–7 | 8th | |
| 2015 | Capital | 4–6 | 4–5 | 6th | |
| Capital: | | 10–20 | 9–18 | | |
| Total: | | 10–20 | | | |
