= Graham Harrell =

American football player and coach (born 1985)

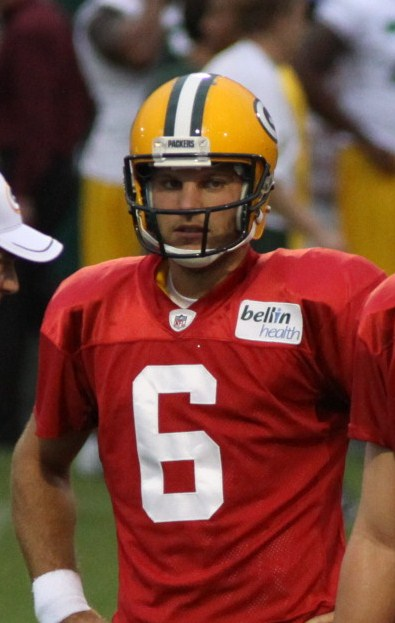
- Harrell with the Green Bay Packers in 2011

Abilene Christian Wildcats
- Title: Offensive coordinator & quarterbacks coach

Personal information
- Born: May 22, 1985 (age 41); Brownwood, Texas, U.S.
- Listed height: 6 ft 2 in (1.88 m)
- Listed weight: 217 lb (98 kg)

Career information
- Position: Quarterback (No. 6)
- High school: Ennis (Ennis, Texas)
- College: Texas Tech (2004–2008)
- NFL draft: 2009: undrafted

Career history

Playing
- Saskatchewan Roughriders (2009); Green Bay Packers (2010–2012); New York Jets (2013)*
- * Offseason or practice squad member only

Coaching
- Oklahoma State (2009) Offensive quality control assistant; Washington State (2014–2015) Outside wide receivers coach; North Texas (2016–2018) Offensive coordinator & quarterbacks coach; USC (2019–2021) Offensive coordinator & quarterbacks coach; West Virginia (2022) Offensive coordinator & quarterbacks coach; Purdue (2023–2024) Offensive coordinator & quarterbacks coach; Central Catholic HS (IN) (2024) Quarterbacks coach; Abilene Christian (2025–present) Offensive coordinator & quarterbacks coach

Awards and highlights
- Super Bowl champion (XLV); Sporting News Player of the Year (2008); Johnny Unitas Golden Arm Award (2008); Sammy Baugh Trophy (2007); First-team All-American (2008); 2× NCAA passing yards leader (2007, 2008)

Career NFL statistics
- Passing attempts: 4
- Passing completions: 2
- Completion percentage: 50.0%
- TD–INT: 0–0
- Passing yards: 20
- Passer rating: 64.6
- Stats at Pro Football Reference
- College Football Hall of Fame

Graham Stanton Harrell (born May 22, 1985) is an American football coach and former quarterback. He is currently the offensive coordinator and quarterbacks coach for the Abilene Christian Wildcats. He played college football for the Texas Tech Red Raiders from 2004 to 2008 and was inducted into the College Football Hall of Fame in 2025.

He played in the Canadian Football League (CFL) and the National Football League (NFL) from 2009 to 2013, with his longest tenure as a player with the Green Bay Packers. He previously served as the offensive coordinator of the North Texas Mean Green (2016–2018), USC Trojans (2019–2021), West Virginia Mountaineers (2022), and the Purdue Boilermakers (2023-24).

Harrell was born in Brownwood, Texas. He attended high school in Ennis, Texas. After high school graduation, he enrolled at Texas Tech University and played quarterback for the Red Raiders, starting for three seasons. As a fifth-senior in 2008, he was named a first-team All-American quarterback, Heisman Trophy finalist in 2008, and set school, conference and national records for passing yards, attempts, completions, and touchdown passes.

After going undrafted in the 2009 NFL draft, he was signed by the Saskatchewan Roughriders of the Canadian Football League in 2009. He was signed into the NFL in 2010 by the Green Bay Packers, where he was a part of the Super Bowl XLV win with the Packers over the Pittsburgh Steelers. He was also a member of the New York Jets.

== Early life ==
Harrell was born to Sam and Kathy Harrell in Brownwood, Texas, where his father was an assistant under legendary Texas high school football coach Gordon Wood. His father was hired as head coach at Ennis High School in Ennis, Texas. Harrell played at EHS under his father's coaching. He was the starting quarterback for three seasons and led the Ennis Lions to a state Class 4A title as a sophomore in 2001. He also played in the 2004 Oil Bowl, receiving the offensive MVP award. Harrell set Texas high school records in these categories:

- Single-season passing yards (4,825 in 2003 over 13 games; the next two quarterbacks on the list set their records over 16-game seasons). This record stood until 2007 when it was broken by Lake Travis quarterback Garrett Gilbert.
- Career passing yards (12,532 from 2000 to 2003; Broken by Gilbert in 2008).
- Single-season touchdown passes (67 in 2003)
- Career touchdown passes (167 from 2000 to 2003)
- Single-season pass completions (334 in 2003; also broken by Gilbert, who recorded 359 completions in 2007).

In addition, Harrell ranks second in career pass completions (805 from 2000 to 2003).

== Playing career ==
=== College career ===
==== Freshman and redshirt freshman seasons ====
In 2004, Harrell redshirted his first season at Texas Tech University. The following season, he served as the backup quarterback behind another Texas Tech record setter, Cody Hodges, who led college football in passing yards in 2005.

==== Sophomore season ====
Harrell started in every game of the 2006 season, beating out classmate Chris Todd. Harrell got the Red Raiders off to a quick start with wins over Southern Methodist University, The University of Texas at El Paso, Southeastern Louisiana University and conference rival Texas A&M. The lone Red Raider loss was to Texas Christian University, 12–3 in the third game of the season. Despite the 4–1 start, Harrell was benched halfway through the next game due to poor play after the Raiders fell behind the Missouri Tigers 24–0, and Todd was inserted for two series. Harrell came back into the game and got the Raiders within 3 points before the half but struggled in the second half as Tech lost 38–21. The next week against a winless Colorado team that Tech was heavily favored to beat, Harrell once again was benched in favor of Todd for a 4 interception game resulting in a 30–6 loss. However, Harrell rebounded to throw for 6 touchdowns against the Iowa State Cyclones and then threw for 519 yards and 3 touchdowns against the Texas Longhorns in a narrow 35–31 loss. The Raiders finished the season with a 55–21 win against the Baylor Bears, a 34–24 loss to the Oklahoma Sooners, and a 30–24 win against the Oklahoma State Cowboys. Texas Tech finished the regular season 7–5 (4–4 in the Big 12) and received an invitation to the 2006 Insight Bowl.

The 7–5 Red Raiders faced off against the 6–6 Minnesota Golden Gophers at the 2006 Insight Bowl in Tempe, Arizona. Texas Tech struggled on both offense and defense during first 3 quarters of the Insight Bowl. The Minnesota Golden Gophers outscored Tech 38–7 through the end of the 3rd quarter. The Red Raiders, sparked by a 43-yard touchdown from Harrell to Joel Filani, went on to outscore the Gophers 31–0 through the end of regulation sending the game into overtime. On the final drive, Harrell drove the Red Raider offense almost 70 yards in less than a minute to set up the game-tying field goal by Alex Trlica. Following a Minnesota field goal, Tech scored a touchdown to win the game 44–41 capping a 31-point deficit, setting the record for the largest comeback victory in FBS bowl history. Harrell threw for 445 yards, two touchdowns, and 1 rushing touchdown and was named the offensive MVP. Tech finished the year 8–5, their 13th straight winning season, and their fifth straight season with at least 8 wins 4th bowl win out of the previous 5 seasons. He threw for 38 touchdowns and 4,555 passing yards, the third-most by a sophomore in NCAA Division I FBS history and the most ever thrown by a sophomore in the history of the Big 12.

==== Junior season ====
Harrell declined to enter the 2007 NFL draft. He continued the success of the previous season, mainly due to the addition of All-American wide receiver Michael Crabtree and the emergence of inside receivers Danny Amendola and Eric Morris. The Raiders started the season off with wins over the SMU Mustangs 49–9, the UTEP Miners 45–31, and the Rice Owls 59–24. Harrell then had a career day against the Oklahoma State Cowboys throwing for 5 touchdowns and 646 yards, however due to the poor play of the Tech defense, the Raiders lost to the Cowboys 49–45. Harrell was still given recognition as the AT&T Player of the Week for his performance despite the loss. The Raiders then reeled off lopsided wins over Northwestern State, Iowa State, and Texas A&M pushing their record to 6–1 and into the national rankings. Harrell being mentioned as a dark horse candidate for the Heisman Trophy. The Raiders then dropped two games to Missouri and Colorado which knocked Tech out of the national conversation, but rebounded to beat Baylor 38–7. Harrell led the Red Raiders into Austin, Texas to face off against Colt McCoy and the Texas Longhorns, in a back and forth affair that Texas won 59–43 by simply outscoring Tech. The Raiders upset the # 4 ranked Oklahoma Sooners in Lubbock to finish the regular season 8–4 overall and 4–4 and third place in the Big 12 South. Tech was invited to the Gator Bowl where they defeated a ranked Virginia team 31–28 to finish 9–4 overall and ranked #22 in the country. Harrell was named the game's Most Valuable Player. He finished the season with a 71.8% completion percentage, throwing for 5,705 yards and 48 touchdowns. He was awarded the Sammy Baugh Trophy, an award for the best passer in college football in a given season.

==== Senior season ====
Entering his senior season, Harrell had 89 career passing touchdowns, putting him within range of Colt Brennan's NCAA record of 131 touchdowns. Before the beginning of his final season, CBS Sports listed Harrell as a Heisman hopeful. Tech wide receiver Michael Crabtree's name also appeared on the list. Harrell was also named one of 26 candidates for the 2008 Unitas Award, given to the nation's best senior college football quarterback. Additionally, his name appeared among 30 other quarterbacks in the Davey O'Brien Award watch list. Harrell, along with coach Mike Leach and teammate Michael Crabtree were featured on the cover of the 2008 edition of Dave Campbell's Texas Football.

To support the Heisman campaign of both Harrell and Crabtree, Texas Tech created a website called PassOrCatch2008.com, which is modeled after political campaigns. The site garnered national attention and was awarded a Telly Award which honors the best in local, regional, and cable commercials and programs, as well as online videos, films, and commercials. After leading the Red Raiders to a victory over the #1 Texas Longhorns, Harrell and teammate Daniel Charbonnet were selected for Big 12 Player of the Week honors. Harrell also overtook Texas quarterback Colt McCoy at the top of the Heisman poll. Harrell was also one of ten finalists for the Johnny Unitas Golden Arm Award and one of thirteen finalists for the Davey O'Brien Award.

Following the inaugural game of the 2008 season, where Texas Tech defeated the Eastern Washington Eagles, 49–24, Harrell was selected as the AT&T ESPN All-America Player. After the Red Raiders 58–28 victory over the Kansas State Wildcats, Harrell received two more honors. He was recognized as the Big 12 Offensive Player of the Week and the O'Brien Quarterback of the Week. During the game against Kansas State, Harrell broke the all-time record for passing yards at Texas Tech. The previous record, set by Kliff Kingsbury, was 12,429 yards. After the game, Harrell's record stood at 12,709 yards. Following the 63–21 win over #18 Kansas on October 25, 2008, Harrell was again named Big 12 Offensive Player of the Week. Teammate Matt Williams was named the Special Teams Player of the Week. After Tech's 65–21 loss to Oklahoma, Harrell's chances of winning the Heisman were reduced. Harrell finished fourth in the Heisman race but did not receive an invitation to attend the presentation ceremony. Michael Crabtree finished fifth.

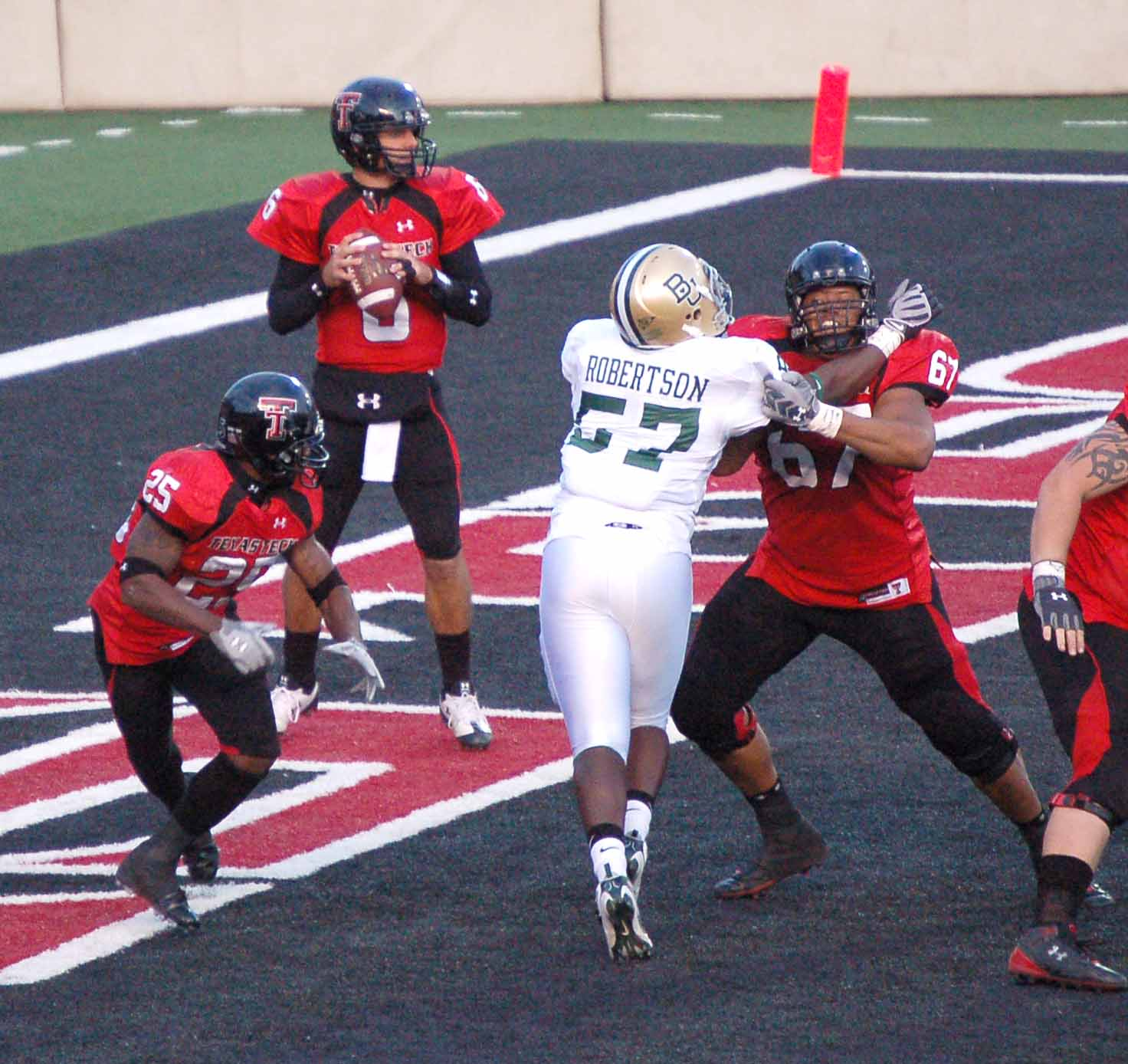
Playing with 2 broken fingers on his left hand, Harrell leads Tech to victory over Baylor.

In the final regular season game against Baylor, Harrell shattered two of his fingers (the pinkie and middle finger) of his non-throwing hand during the second quarter. At halftime, Harrell's hand was x-rayed, and medical examiners advised Harrell to discontinue playing in the game. Harrell replied, "Tape my hand up. I'm going out." Harrell played the rest of the game with black tape around his fingers. He finished with 309 total passing yards and two touchdowns. With the victory, Tech clinched a share of the Big 12 South title, though fell short at going to the Big 12 Championship Game. On the day following the Baylor game, Harrell underwent a four-hour surgery, in which 17 pins and two plates were inserted into his injured hand to heal nine different breaks. He was later cleared to play in the postseason bowl game.

On December 2, 2008, Harrell and teammate Michael Crabtree were named as Walter Camp Award finalists.

On December 4, 2008, the American Football Coaches Association compiled its 2008 AFCA Coaches' All-American Team, with Harrell headlining the list.

On October 25, 2008, Graham Harrell passed Philip Rivers to move into sole possession of third place for passing yardage in a career. On November 22, 2008, Harrell passed Ty Detmer to move into second for passing yardage in a career behind Timmy Chang. On January 2, 2009, Harrell played his final collegiate game, a 34–47 loss to Ole Miss in the 2009 AT&T Cotton Bowl Classic. In the game, Harrell finished his college career with an NCAA all-time record of 134 passing touchdowns, breaking the previous mark of 131 set by Colt Brennan. He also equaled Brennan's record of 147 career touchdowns passing, rushing, and receiving, a record that would be broken the following year by Central Michigan's Dan LeFevour. Harrell also compiled 5,111 passing yards in the season, becoming the first NCAA player to post multiple 5,000-yard passing seasons.

=== College statistics ===
Year	Team	GP	Cmp	Att	Pct	Yds	TD	Int	QBR
2005	Texas Tech	6	37	55	67.3	422	3	0	149.7
2006	Texas Tech	13	412	617	66.8	4,555	38	11	145.5
2007	Texas Tech	13	512	713	71.8	5,705	48	14	157.3
2008	Texas Tech	13	442	626	70.6	5,111	45	9	160.0
Career		45	1,403	2,011	69.8	15,793	134	34	154.3

==== NCAA records ====
Harrell holds 8 Individual NCAA records. See also NCAA records held by individual Red Raiders

NCAA record	Statistic
Most passes completed in a season	512 (2007)
Most passes completed on average per game in a season	39.4 (2007)
Most passes completed per game in a career	31.2
Most games gaining 400 Yards or more passing in a season	11 (2007) (13 Games)
Most games gaining 400 yards or more passing in a career	20 (Tied)
Most yards gained on average against one opponent per game in a career	486.3 (Minimum 3 Games, vs Texas)
Most seasons gaining 4,000 yards or more total offense	3 (Tied)
Most games gaining 400 yards or more total offense in a career	21 (Tied)

The NCAA Records book also mentions Graham Harrell for the following items:

- Single-game yards passing: 646 (Rank 6th) (Vs Oklahoma St. September 22, 2007)
- Single-game yards, total offense: 643 (Rank 7th) (Vs Oklahoma St. September 22, 2007)
- Single-game attempts: 72 (Rank 23rd) (vs Oklahoma November 17, 2007)
- single-game completions: 48 (18th) (vs UTEP September 8, 2007)
- Single-game completions: 47 (Rank 20th) (vs Oklahoma November 17, 2007)
- Season yards passing: 5,705 (Rank 2nd) 2007
- Season yards passing: 5,111 (Rank 8th) 2008
- Season yards total offense: 5,614 (Rank 5th) 2007
- Season yards total offense: 5.096 (Rank 13th) 2008
- Season yards per game passing: 438.8 (Rank 3rd) 2007
- Season yards per game passing: 393.2 (Rank 14th) 2008
- Season yards per game total offense: 431.8 (Rank 3rd) 2007
- Season yards per game total offense: 392 (Rank 18th) 2008
- Season touchdown passes: 48 (Rank 7th) 2007
- Season touchdown passes: 45 (Rank 14th) 2008
- Career yards passing: 15,793 (Rank 4th)
- Career yards total offense: 15,599 (Rank 5th)
- Career yards passing per game: 351 (Rank 3rd)
- Career yards per game total offense: 346.6 (Rank 5th)
- Career touchdown passes: 134 (Rank 3rd)
- Annual total offense champion: 2007

NCAA records reference (Last referenced for 2015 season)

==== Awards and honors ====
Harrell has received multiple honors, including the 2008 Johnny Unitas Golden Arm Award.

2006	2006 Insight Bowl MVP	Selected
2006	All-Big 12	Selected for honorable-mention
2006	Academic All-Big 12	Selected for first-team
2007	AT&T ESPN All-America Player of the Week	Selected twice
2007	All-Big-12	Selected for second-team
2007	Sammy Baugh Trophy	Winner
2007	Academic All-Big 12	Selected for first-team
2008	2008 Gator Bowl MVP	Selected
2008	AT&T ESPN All-America Player of the Week	Selected four times
2008	Academic All-Big 12	Selected for first-team	Posted a 4.00 GPA
2008	AFCA Coaches' All-American	Selected
2008	National Football Foundation National Scholar-Athlete	Selected
2008	Johnny Unitas Golden Arm Award	Winner
2008	Heisman Trophy	Candidate	Finished fourth
2008	All-Big 12	Selected for honorable-mention
2008	The Sporting News 2008 National Player of the Year	Selected	Co-national player of the year with Sam Bradford and Colt McCoy
2008	AT&T All-America Player of the Year	Winner	Voted on by fans

=== Professional career ===
==== Pre-draft ====
Following his senior season at Texas Tech, Harrell entered the 2009 NFL draft but went undrafted to the surprise of many. He participated in rookie camp for the Cleveland Browns in May 2009 but was not signed despite coach Eric Mangini giving Harrell praise. UFL Access reported that Harrell would work out in front of United Football League representatives in Las Vegas.

==== Saskatchewan Roughriders ====
On July 20, 2009, Harrell signed a two-year plus an option contract with the Saskatchewan Roughriders of the Canadian Football League, joining former Texas Tech teammate Eric Morris who had signed months earlier. After a brief stay in the CFL, Harrell requested to be released from his CFL contract to pursue his NFL options, and was released by the Roughriders on April 22, 2010.

==== Green Bay Packers ====
Harrell signed with the Green Bay Packers on May 19, 2010. On December 18, Harrell was signed to the active roster due to an injury to Aaron Rodgers. On September 3, 2011, the Packers released Harrell, but they re-signed him on September 4, 2011, to the practice squad. On December 7, 2011, the Packers again signed Harrell to the active roster. After the departure of primary back-up Matt Flynn, Harrell was promoted to the active roster full-time and was named Rodgers' primary backup.

On September 30, 2012, Graham played in his first game for Green Bay. Coming in for one snap in the red zone, Harrell took the snap to hand off to Cedric Benson, but was tripped by his center, resulting in a fumbled hand off and a lost fumble. Harrell appeared in four regular-season games, completing 2 of 4 passes for 20 yards. He hosted a weekly sports talk show called the "Witt Ford Red Zone with Graham Harrell" every Monday during the 2012 season on 104.1 FM WRLU and archived at DoorCountyDailyNews.com.

Harrell struggled in the pre-season and on August 24, 2013, USA Today reported that Green Bay would be releasing Harrell, as former Tennessee Titans quarterback Vince Young outplayed Harrell according to the Packers coaching staff in the pre-season.

==== New York Jets ====
Harrell was signed by the New York Jets on August 28, 2013. He was brought in after reserve quarterback Greg McElroy re-injured his knee. Harrell played for one series at the end of the Jets' final 2013 preseason game against the Eagles in relief of Matt Simms. He was released on September 2, 2013, after the Jets signed Brady Quinn.

== Coaching career ==
=== Early career ===
Harrell first started coaching by accepting a quality control position at Oklahoma State when Mike Gundy hired former Tech offensive coordinator Dana Holgorsen to run the Cowboy offense. Harrell helped tutor the OSU quarterbacks with the new Air Raid system that Gundy had hired Holgorsen to run. Harrell left OSU to play football in Canada. After not playing in the NFL during the 2013 season, Harrell joined the coaching staff at Washington State in April 2014, re-uniting him with his college coach Mike Leach. Harrell was given the position of offensive analyst. In February 2015, Harrell was named the football program's outside receivers coach, replacing Dennis Simmons.

=== North Texas ===
In December 2015, former Texas Tech running backs coach Seth Littrell was named head football coach at the University of North Texas. Harrell became one of Littrell's first hires, as he was named offensive coordinator and quarterbacks coach at UNT. Despite being named OC at North Texas, Harrell said he would honor his contract with Leach and WSU and coach the Cougars in the Sun Bowl.

At UNT, Harrell inherited an offense that had ranked in the bottom 25 of the country in passing, total yards, and points in 2015. He improved the unit such that his offenses were ranked in the top 26 nationally in passing, total yards, and points in both 2017 and 2018.

=== USC ===
On December 7, 2018, UNC-Chapel Hill sports site Inside Carolina claimed that Harrell had accepted the role of offensive coordinator at the University of North Carolina, but Inside Carolina retracted the claim hours later. On January 29, 2019, Harrell was hired as the offensive coordinator and quarterbacks coach at the University of Southern California (USC) under head coach Clay Helton.

=== West Virginia ===
On January 10, 2022, Harrell was hired as the offensive coordinator and quarterbacks coach at West Virginia University.

=== Purdue ===
On December 20, 2022, Harrell was named the offensive coordinator for the Purdue Boilermakers.

After Purdue began the 2024 season 1–3 while averaging just 12.7 points per game in those losses, Harrell was fired on September 29.

=== Abilene Christian ===
On January 28, 2025, Harrell was named the associate head coach, offensive coordinator, and quarterbacks coach for the Abilene Christian Wildcats. The Wildcats averaged 29.4 points per game, 236.7 passing yards per game, and 170.9 rushing yards per game in 2025.

== Personal life ==
Harrell is the son of Sam and Kathy Harrell. His grandfather served as assistant coach to Gordon Wood. Harrell has an older brother, Zac, who was a receiver on Ennis High's 2000 State Championship team, and is a graduate of the University of North Texas and coaches at the high school level, serving as the head football coach and athletic director at Athens High School in Athens, Texas. Graham also has a younger brother, Clark Harrell, who played a year at quarterback for the Tulsa Golden Hurricane. Clark transferred to Abilene Christian University after his freshman season at Tulsa and graduated from ACU in 2011. Clark is now the head coach at New Diana High School in Diana, Texas.

Sam Harrell, Graham's father, was the highest paid high school coach in Texas as of the 2005–06 academic year. He coached at Reagan County (1990–1993) and Ennis (1994–2009) before retiring from coaching duties in December 2010 due to health problems. Sam returned to the sidelines after over two years of aggressive treatment for multiple sclerosis, coaching in Brownwood under Bob Shipley, father of Jacksonville Jaguars and former Texas wideout Jordan Shipley. After a short stint as the offensive coordinator for the Southwestern Assembly of God University Lions in Waxahachie, Texas, Sam returned to Ennis High School as the head coach of the Ennis Lions.

Harrell has been married to Brittney Tomlinson of Tyler, Texas since March 2012. They have a son, Herschel Hawk, who was born in 2015.

== See also ==
- 2006 Texas Tech Red Raiders football team
- 2007 Texas Tech Red Raiders football team
- 2008 Texas Tech Red Raiders football team
- NCAA Division I FBS passing leaders
- List of NCAA major college football yearly passing leaders
- List of NCAA major college football yearly total offense leaders
