= Blake Brockermeyer =

American football player (born 1973)

No. 78, 71
- Position: Offensive tackle

Personal information
- Born: April 11, 1973 (age 53); Fort Worth, Texas, U.S.
- Listed height: 6 ft 4 in (1.93 m)
- Listed weight: 300 lb (136 kg)

Career information
- High school: Arlington Heights (Fort Worth)
- College: Texas
- NFL draft: 1995: 1st round, 29th overall pick

Career history
- Carolina Panthers (1995–1998); Chicago Bears (1999–2001); Denver Broncos (2002–2003)

Awards and highlights
- PFWA All-Rookie Team (1995); First-team All-American (1994); 2× First-team All-SWC (1993, 1994); Southwest Conference Champion - 1994; 1994 Sun Bowl Champion; 1994 Sun Bowl Most Valuable Lineman

Career NFL statistics
- Games played: 136
- Games started: 103
- Fumble recoveries: 4
- Stats at Pro Football Reference

Blake Weeks Brockermeyer (born April 11, 1973) is an American former professional football player who was an offensive tackle for the Carolina Panthers, Chicago Bears, and Denver Broncos of the National Football League (NFL). Before that, he was an All-American college football player for the Texas Longhorns. After his playing career, he coached in high school and college. He then became a college football analyst for 247sports.

== Early life ==
Brockermeyer was born in Fort Worth, Texas and attended high school at Arlington Heights High School there where he was a consensus All-State selection.

== College career ==
He played college football at the University of Texas from 1992-1994. He started all 34 games while attending.

He was a two-time All-SWC offensive tackle in 1993 and 1994.

As a junior, he was an All-American in 1994 and a semifinalist for the Outland Trophy. That year he was a team captain and helped Texas to win a share of the Southwest Conference Championship and defeat North Carolina to win the Sun Bowl. In the Sun Bowl he was named the game's Most Valuable Lineman.

After earning a degree in speech communications, he chose to skip his senior year to enter the NFL a year early and ended his career with a 16-game streak without giving up a single sack.

== Professional career ==
Pre-draft measurables
Height	Weight	Arm length	Hand span	Bench press
6 ft 4 5/8 in (1.95 m)	305 lb (138 kg)	33 in (0.84 m)	10 1/2 in (0.27 m)	18 reps

=== Carolina Panthers ===
He was selected in the first round of the 1995 NFL Draft by the Carolina Panthers, 29th overall. He made the NFL All-Rookie team in 1995 and was the starting left tackle for the Panthers from 1995 to 1998.

In 1996 he broke his thumb 12 weeks into the season and did not return to the starting lineup when he recovered, seeing only limited playing time as the Panthers went to the NFC Conference Championship game.

He started the 1997 season on the bench, but earned his way back into the starting lineup by week 4.

He missed two weeks in the 1998 season with a sprained left knee and was ejected from a game against the Packers for throwing a punch, but started every game he was healthy for.

=== Chicago Bears ===
In 1999, he signed a free agent contract with the Chicago Bears where he started 45 out of 46 games over three seasons from 1999 to 2001. In 1999, he missed a game with a concussion.

After undergoing shoulder and knee surgery in the offseason, he was released by the Bears after the 2002 season for salary cap reasons.

=== Denver Broncos ===
He was signed by the Broncos in June of 2002. He played the 2002 season with the Denver Broncos, where he was a back-up before they released him at the end of the season.

He was re-signed by the Broncos the following June and played with them again as a backup throughout most the 2003 season, but did get two starts following the injury of Ephraim Salaam.

In November of 2003, he sued the Bears for medical malpractice, alleging the team doctors incorrectly evaluated his shoulder in December 2001 and allowed him to play out the season despite the risk of permanent damage.

He became a free agent in 2004, but was not signed by another team.

He concluded his nine-year NFL career having played in 136 games with 103 starts.

== Coaching and Analyst ==
Brockermeyer returned to Fort Worth where he began coaching, first at the middle school but later at the high school level. He served various roles at All Saints Episcopal School in Fort Worth, Texas, for 12 seasons, where he was part of five State Championship teams. In 2018 he joined the SMU Mustangs football staff as Defensive Quality Control Analyst, where he worked for two seasons. In 2021 he was hired as the offensive line coach for the Sea Lions of The Spring League.

That league folded and Brockermeyer later became an analyst for 247sports and CBS Sports.

== Honors ==
Brockermeyer was inducted into the Sun Bowl Hall of Fame - Legends of the Sun Bowl - in 2013 and into the University of Texas Hall of Honor in 2015.

== Personal life ==
Brockermeyer married his wife, Kristy, in 1996. The couple has four sons: Jack, Luke, Tommy and James. His oldest son, Jack, graduated from Rice University in May 2020. Luke played linebacker for the University of Texas, where he was an Honorable Mention All-Big 12 selection in 2021, before graduating in 2023. His twin sons James and Tommy were recruited by Texas but committed to Alabama. James played two seasons at Alabama, then transferred to TCU for his junior year and as of 2025 plays offensive line for the University of Miami. James's twin brother Tommy originally also played offensive line for the University of Alabama and transferred in 2023 to TCU, but after the 2023 season he "retired" from football.
