= B. J. Symons =

American football player (born 1980)

B.J. Symons
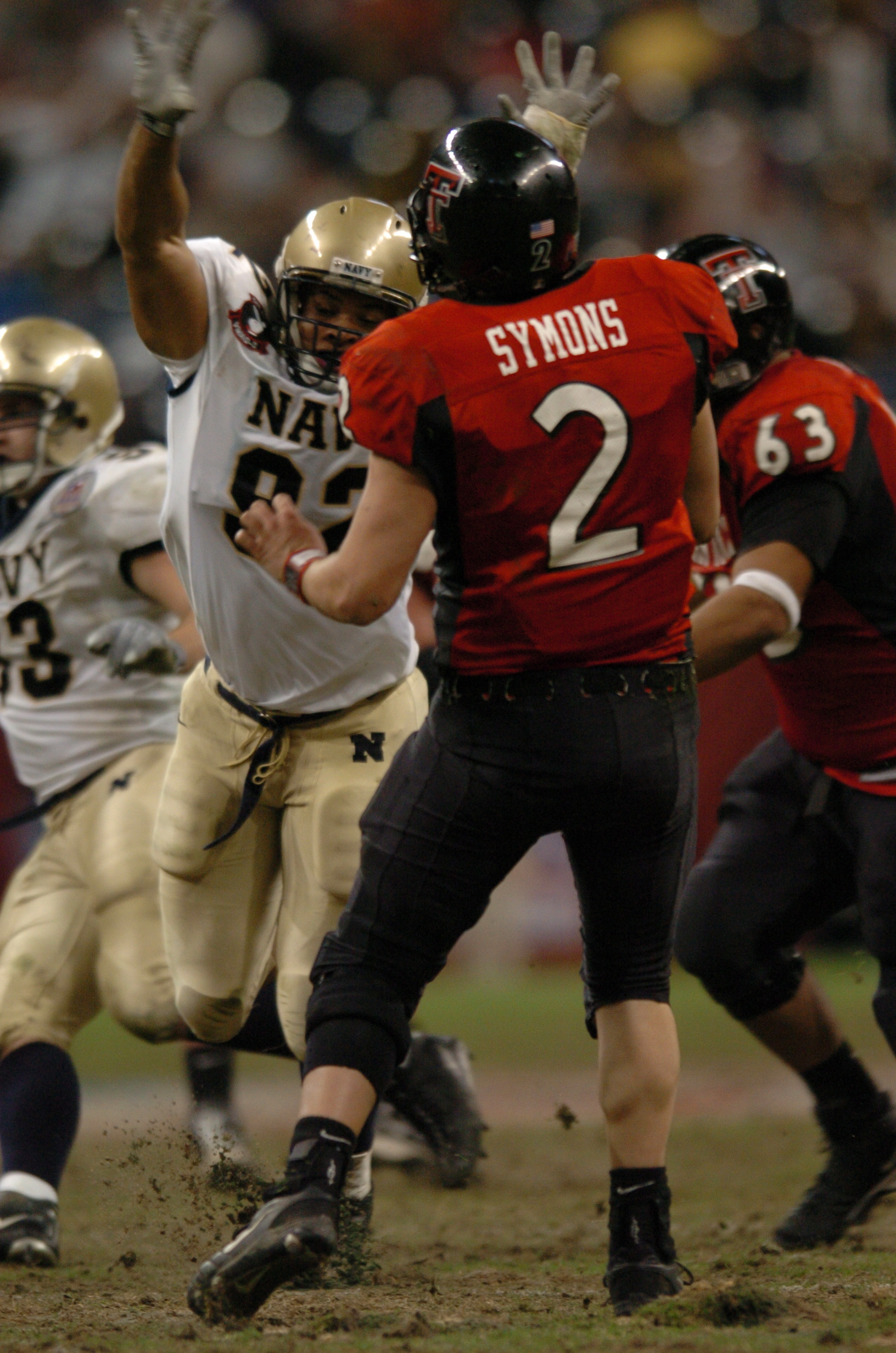
- Symons throws at the 2003 Houston Bowl

No. 2
- Position: Quarterback

Personal information
- Born: November 19, 1980 (age 45); Houston, Texas, U.S.
- Listed height: 6 ft 1 in (1.85 m)
- Listed weight: 215 lb (98 kg)

Career information
- High school: Cypress Creek (Houston)
- College: Texas Tech
- NFL draft: 2004: 7th round, 248th overall pick

Career history
- Houston Texans (2004); → Frankfurt Galaxy (2005); Chicago Bears (2006)*; → Berlin Thunder (2006); Tampa Bay Storm (2007)
- * Offseason or practice squad member only

Awards and highlights
- Sammy Baugh Trophy (2003); NCAA passing yards leader (2003); Second-team All-Big 12 (2003)

Brian Jeffrey Symons (born November 19, 1980) is an American former football quarterback. He played college football for Texas Tech, where he was a record setting passer. He was selected by the Houston Texans in the seventh round of the 2004 NFL draft. Symons later played in NFL Europe for the Frankfurt Galaxy and Berlin Thunder.

== Early life ==
Born and raised in Houston, Texas, Symons was a standout quarterback for the Cypress Creek High School football team. Symons completed 126 passes in 228 attempts for 1,597 and 11 touchdowns during senior season and rushed for 411 yards and seven touchdowns and was named first-team all-District 16-5A as a junior and senior. Symons completed 259 passes in 478 attempts for 3,704 yards and 27 touchdowns in two years as a starter during high school career. He was a member of SuperPrep Magazine's southwest top 100 and was listed as one of the top 100 players in the state by the Lubbock Avalanche-Journal, The Dallas Morning News, Fort Worth Star-Telegram, and Houston Chronicle. He was also a three-year starting pitcher in baseball for CCHS. Symons was offered scholarships by the Texas Tech Red Raiders and Oklahoma Sooners. Symons chose Texas Tech over Oklahoma, then coached by Spike Dykes. Symons was recruited by Mike Leach while he was the Sooners' offensive coordinator. Leach would later become his head coach in 2000 when he was hired as the head coach of the Red Raiders.

== College career ==
Symons played for the Red Raiders from 1999 to 2003. Symons was the second-string quarterback for part of his redshirt freshman season in 1999, and backed up Kliff Kingsbury from 2000 to 2002. From 2000 to 2002 Symons saw action in 17 games completing 56 passes out of 80 attempts for a 70% completion rate and 7 touchdown passes in back-up duty.

=== 2003 season ===
Symons started for one season as quarterback for the Texas Tech Red Raiders. During his only season as a starter (his senior year), Texas Tech finished the season 8–5, and Symons broke the FBS (Note: Then known as Division I-A.) record for single-season passing yards at 5,833 yards (since surpassed by Bailey Zappe of Western Kentucky in 2021). Symons set the NCAA 12-Game Passing Record with 5,336 yards in 2003. He broke Ty Detmer’s record of 5,188, set in 1990 at BYU. Symons also established a new NCAA 12-Game Total Offense Record with 5,476 yards this season. At the time of his graduation Symons held the Big 12 and Tech record with 48 touchdown passes in one season. Symons broke Kliff Kingsbury’s school and Big 12 single-season record of 45 touchdown passes. During the season, B. J. Symons tore his ACL while celebrating a touchdown pass against Iowa State. Although his statistics suffered slightly, he was still able to complete the most prolific season of passing in NCAA history. After finishing his career by extending his single-season passing record to 5,833 yards, he told reporters he will undergo reconstructive surgery on his anterior cruciate ligament. Symons ended his senior year with 52 TD passes, second only to the 54 thrown by Houston's David Klingler in 1990. His favorite target, Wes Welker, tied an NCAA record by catching a pass in his 47th consecutive game.

During the season, he had a stretch where he threw for 4,036 yards in just 9 games including 586 yards against North Carolina State University, 661 yards against the University of Mississippi, and 505 yards against Texas A&M University.

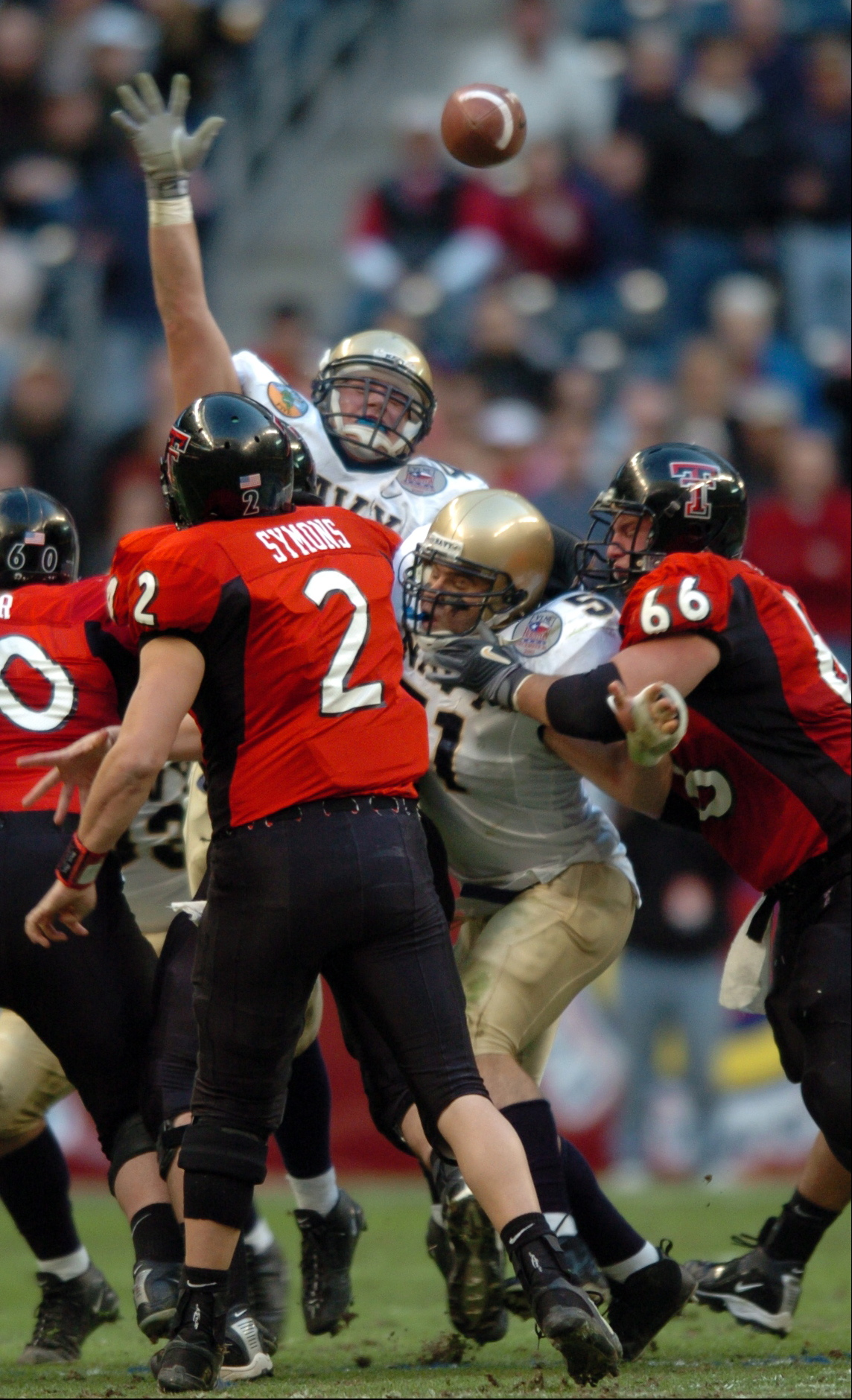
Symons passes at the 2003 Houston Bowl

==== 2003 Houston Bowl ====
Tech was selected to play in the EV1.net Houston Bowl against the Navy Midshipmen at Reliant Stadium in Houston, Texas, giving Symons the opportunity to play his final collegiate game in his hometown. Symons threw touchdown passes to Nehimiah Glover, Jarrett Hicks, and 2 touchdown passes to Mickey Peters en route to a 38–14 win over Navy. Symons was selected as offensive MVP for the game, capping off his season with 5,833 passing yards and 52 touchdown passes.

=== Statistics ===
Legend
	FBS record
	Led FBS
**Bold**	Career high

Season	Team	Games			Passing								Rushing			
Season	Team	GP	GS	Record	Cmp	Att	Pct	Yds	Y/A	TD	Int	Rtg	Att	Yds	Avg	TD
1999	Texas Tech	0	0	—	Redshirted (redshirt)											
2000	Texas Tech	5	0	—	8	25	32.0	56	2.2	0	0	50.8	3	12	4.0	0
2001	Texas Tech	4	0	—	23	35	65.7	160	4.6	2	2	111.5	6	22	3.7	1
2002	Texas Tech	9	0	—	28	43	65.1	329	7.7	5	1	163.1	12	31	2.6	0
2003	Texas Tech	13	13	8–5	470	719	65.4	5,833	8.1	52	22	151.3	79	143	1.8	5
Career		31	13	8–5	529	822	64.4	6,378	7.8	59	25	147.1	100	208	2.1	6

=== Accolades ===
- 2003 Houston Bowl Most Valuable Player
- Big 12 Conference Coaches' Second-team
- The Dallas Morning News All-Big 12 Second-team
- Sammy Baugh Trophy recipient (nation's top collegiate quarterback)
- Associated Press All-Big 12 Second-team
- Chevrolet National Offensive Player of the Year
- Fort Worth Star-Telegram All-Big 12 Second-team
- Big 12 Conference Academic Second-team
- San Antonio Express-News All-Big 12 Second-team
- CollegeFootballNews.com All-America Honorable Mention
- 10th in 2003 Heisman Trophy voting

=== NCAA records ===
When his college career ended, Symons was the holder of 11 individual NCAA FBS records.

NCAA record	Statistic
Season Passing Yards (Total) / Season Passing Yards (13 Games)	5,976 – 5,833 passing, 143 rushing (2003)
Season Passing Yards (12 Games)	5,336 (2003)
Most yards gained passing, season	5,833 (2003)
Most passes attempted, season	719 (2003)
Most yards gained passing in 4 consecutive games	2,239 (Sep 20 – Oct 11, 2003)
Most yards gained, Total Offense, season	5,976 (2003)
Most yards gained, Total Offense, 3 games	1,799 (2003)
Most yards gained, Total Offense, 4 games	2,328 (2003)
Most games gaining 400 yards or more, Total Offense, season	11 (2003)
Most consecutive games gaining 400 yards or more, Total Offense, season	9 (2003)
Most consecutive games gaining 400 yards or more, Total Offense, career	9 (2003)
Most consecutive games gaining 400 yards or more, Total Offense, season	Need More Space Here Now More More

The NCAA record book also mentions Symons for the following items:

- Single-Game Yards Passing: 661 (Rank-4th) (vs Ole Miss) September 27, 2003
- Single-Game Yards Passing: 586 (Rank-23rd) (vs North Carolina St.) September 20, 2003
- Season Yards Per Game Passing: 448.7 (Rank-2nd) 2003
- Season Touchdown Passes: 52 (Rank-3rd) 2003
- Single-Game Yards Total Offense: 681 (Rank 5th) (vs Ole Miss) September 27, 2003
- Single-Game Yards Total Offense: 618 (Rank 14th) (vs North Carolina St.) September 20, 2003
- Season Yards Per Game Total Offense: 459.7 (Rank 2nd) 2003
- Annual Total Offense Champion (2003)

== Professional career ==
Pre-draft measurables
Height	Weight	Arm length	Hand span
6 ft 0 1/2 in (1.84 m)	210 lb (95 kg)	30 1/2 in (0.77 m)	9 1/2 in (0.24 m)
All values from NFL Combine

Symons was selected in the seventh round of the 2004 NFL draft by the Houston Texans with the 248th overall pick. He officially signed with the team on July 21. He was placed on the reserve/non-football injury list on August 31, and spent the entire regular season there. In 2005, the Texans allocated Symons to NFL Europe to play for the Frankfurt Galaxy. He played in five games for the Galaxy as the backup to Akili Smith, completing 12 of 26 passes for 117 yards and one interception while also rushing four times for 12 yards and one touchdown. Symons was released by the Texans with an injury settlement on September 9, 2005, before the start of the 2005 NFL season.

Symons signed a futures contract with the Chicago Bears on January 10, 2006. He was allocated to NFL Europe to play for the Berlin Thunder. He appeared in five games during the 2006 NFL Europe season, recording 31 completions on 66 attempts (47.0%) for 396 yards and four touchdowns with no interceptions. He also rushed eight times for 23 yards and a touchdown. Symons was released by the Bears on August 24, 2006.

On October 20, 2006, Symons signed with the Tampa Bay Storm of the Arena Football League (AFL) for the 2007 AFL season. He was placed on injured reserve on February 26, 2007, before the start of the season and never played for the Storm.

== Personal life ==
Symons graduated from Texas Tech University with a Bachelor of Business Administration degree in management from the Rawls College of Business. He retired from Football at the end of 2009. He currently resides in the Houston, TX area where he works in Commercial banking, is married and has three children.

== See also ==
- List of NCAA major college football yearly total offense leaders
