= Van Malone =

American football player and coach (born 1970)

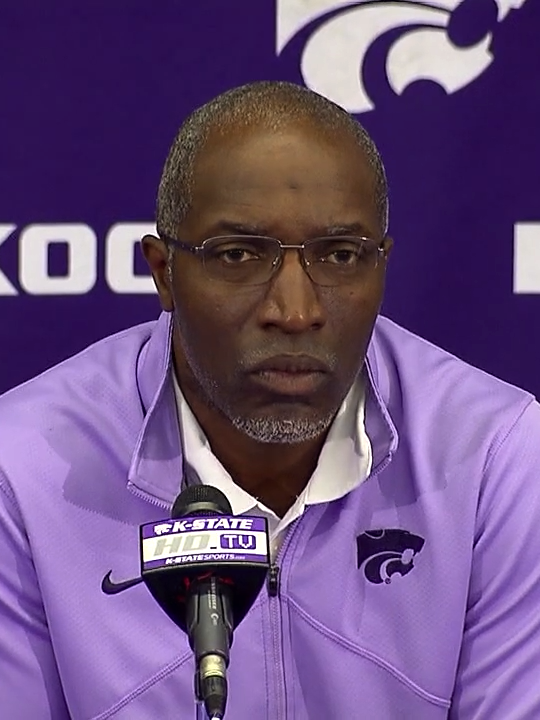
- Malone in 2022

Current position
- Title: Head coach
- Team: Hampton
- Conference: CAA
- Record: 1–4

Biographical details
- Born: July 1, 1970 (age 56); Houston, Texas, U.S.

Playing career
- 1990–1993: Texas
- 1994–1997: Detroit Lions
- 1998: Arizona Cardinals*
- Position: Safety

Coaching career (HC unless noted)
- 1999–2002: Waltrip HS (TX) (asst.)
- 2003: Conroe HS (TX) (asst.)
- 2003: North Dakota State (WR)
- 2003: Detroit Lions (fellow)
- 2004: Western Michigan (CB/ST)
- 2005: North Texas (DB/ST)
- 2006–2009: Texas A&M (DB)
- 2010–2011: Tulsa (DB/RC)
- 2012–2014: Oklahoma State (DB)
- 2015–2017: SMU (DC)
- 2018: Mississippi State (DA)
- 2019: Kansas State (CB)
- 2020–2025: Kansas State (AHC/PGC/CB)
- 2026–present: Hampton

Head coaching record
- Overall: 1–4

Accomplishments and honors

Awards
- As player: First-team All-SWC (1993); As coach: AFCA Assistant Coach of the Year (2017)

Van Buren Malone (born July 1, 1970) is an American football coach and former professional safety who is the head coach for the Hampton Pirates. He played college football for the Texas Longhorns from 1990 to 1993. He played in the National Football League (NFL) for five seasons, primarily with the Detroit Lions.

== College career ==
Malone was a four-year letterman (1990–93) at the University of Texas. As a freshman in 1990, Malone earned Sporting News Freshman All-American honors as he led the team in blocked kicks (with two) and Texas won the Southwest Conference Championship. He again led the team in blocked kicks in 1992. In his senior year he was honored as a Longhorn team captain in 1993 and was awarded the Darrell Royal Award for tenacity in 1993 as well. At the end of the season he was named All-SWC as a defensive back.

Malone played in the Blue-Gray All-Star Classic and the Hula Bowl following his senior year.

He majored in education/sports management while at Texas, and earned his degree in social science from the University of Houston in 2002.

== Professional career ==
Malone played five seasons in the NFL after being drafted in the second round - the 57th selection overall - by the Detroit Lions in 1994. He played in every game as a rookie and was a standout special teams player and a safety, earning Special Teams Player of the Week on six occasions. His special teams play earned him a nomination for the Pro Bowl in 1994 and 1995. The Lions reached the NFL playoffs in both 1994 and 1995. In 1996, Malone started every game and was named the special teams captain and was awarded a game ball three times. After the 1997 season, which Malone finished on the injured reserve, he was signed by the Arizona Cardinals and released before the season started due to injury. He retired at the end of the season.

During his time with the Lions, Malone also served as a marketing intern with Reebok International and provided post-game analysis and commentary for local television. He was a True Value NFL Man of the Year semifinalist and was called on by the club to speak to many organizations.

== Coaching ==
Beginning in 1997, Malone was a youth camp director and football coordinator at the Texas Sports Development Academy in San Antonio. He also co-founded and headed up the "New Beginnings," a non-profit charity organization in Houston.

Malone began coaching in the high school ranks at Houston Waltrip in 1999. In 2002 he moved to Conroe High School where he coached for two years. He earned the Houston High School Coaches Association "Assistant Coach of the Year" in 2000 and was also honored by the Houston Police Department with the "Lifesaver of the Year" Award.

In 2003, Malone served an NFL Minority Coaching Fellowship with the Detroit Lions and also worked with wide receivers at North Dakota State University.

He spent the rest of his career in the college ranks. He was the cornerback coach and worked with the special teams at Western Michigan in 2004. He coached defensive backs at the University of North Texas during the 2005 season and also assisted coaching the special teams. He then spent four years at Texas A&M coaching the cornerbacks in his first two years (2006–07) and the safeties in his final two seasons (2008–09). He was then the secondary coach and recruiting coordinator at Tulsa for two seasons (2010–11), and then the secondary coach at Oklahoma State for three more (2012–14).

In 2015 he moved up to the role of Defensive Coordinator at SMU. In 2017 he was named the American Football Coaches Association (AFCA) National FBS Assistant Coach of the Year. When Chad Morris went to Arkansas, he didn't take Malone with him, and his replacement, Sonny Dykes, didn't retain him to the new SMU staff.

After being let go by SMU, Malone spent a year as the defensive quality control coach at Mississippi State, before going to Kansas State as the Cornerbacks coach in 2019. In 2020 he was promote to Assistant Head Coach and defensive passing game coordinator while retaining his job as cornerbacks coach. During his time at Kansas State, he was named Big 12 Cornerbacks Coach of the Year by Our Coaching Network and helped the Wildcats win the 2022 Big 12 Conference Championship.

In 2022 he was selected for the National Coalition of Minority Football Coaches Coalition Academy. He and K-State quarterback Will Howard earned the Be the Match Champions Award from the Maxwell Football Club for spearheading the Wildcats’ effort for the Be the Match national bone marrow donor program.

In December 2025, Malone was named the head coach at Hampton University, replacing Trenton Boykin.

== Head coaching record ==
Year	Team	Overall	Conference	Standing	Bowl/playoffs
Hampton Pirates (Coastal Athletic Association Football Conference) (2026–present)
2026	Hampton	1–4	0–2		
Hampton:		1–4	0–2		
Total:		1–4			
