= 1993 All-Southwest Conference football team =

American college football all-star team

The 1993 All-Southwest Conference football team consists of American football players chosen by various organizations for All-Southwest Conference teams for the 1993 NCAA Division I-A football season. The selectors for the 1993 season included the Associated Press (AP).

== Offensive selections ==
=== Quarterbacks ===
- Robert Hall, Texas Tech (AP-1)

=== Running backs ===
- Bam Morris, Texas Tech (AP-1)
- Yoncy Edmonds, Rice (AP-1)
- Rodney Thomas, Texas A&M (AP-1)

=== Tight ends ===
- Brian Collins, TCU (AP-1)

=== Wide receivers ===
- Mike Adams, Texas (AP-1)
- Lloyd Hill, Texas Tech (AP-1)
- Lovell Pinkney, Texas (AP-1)

=== Offensive linemen ===
- Blake Brockermeyer, Texas (AP-1)
- Stacey Petrich, Texas Tech (AP-1)
- Brad Elam, Texas Tech (AP-1)
- Chris Dausin, Texas A&M (AP-1)
- David Leaks, Baylor (AP-1)
- Jason Mathews, Texas A&M (AP-1)

== Defensive selections ==
=== Defensive lineman ===
- Sam Adams, Texas A&M (AP-1)
- Tony Brackens, Texas (AP-1)
- Eric England, Texas A&M (AP-1)
- Royal West, TCU (AP-1)

=== Linebackers ===
- Ryan McCoy, Houston (AP-1)
- Antonio Armstrong, Texas A&M (AP-1)
- Winfred Tubbs, Texas (AP-1)

=== Defensive backs ===
- Nathan Bennett, Rice (AP-1)
- Aaron Glenn, Texas A&M (AP-1)
- Van Malone, Texas (AP-1)
- Ray Mickens, Texas A&M (AP-1)

== Special teams ==
=== Kickers ===
- Scott Szeredy, Texas (AP-1)
- John Stewart, SMU (AP-1)

=== Punters ===
- Duane Vacek, Texas (AP-1)

=== Return specialists ===
- Leeland McElroy, Texas A&M (AP-1)

== Miscellaneous ==
- Offensive Player of the Year: Bam Morris, Texas Tech (AP)
- Defensive Player of the Year: Aaron Glenn, Texas A&M (AP)
- Coach of the Year: R. C. Slocum, Texas A&M (AP)
- Newcomers of the Year: Tony Brackens, Texas and Leeland McElroy, Texas A&M (AP)

== Key ==
AP = Associated Press

== See also ==
1993 College Football All-America Team
