= Total offense =

American football statistic

Total offense, also called total yards, is a gridiron football statistic representing the total number of yards rushing and yards passing by a player or team. Total offense differs from yards from scrimmage, which gives credit for passing yardage to the person receiving the football rather than the person throwing the football. In football, progress is measured by advancing the football towards the opposing team's goal line. The team on offense can make progress during the play by advancing the ball from the line of scrimmage.

When the offensive team advances the ball by rushing the football, the player who carries the ball is given credit for the net gain, measured in rushing yards. When the offensive team advances the ball by pass reception, the player who throws the ball earns passing yards and the player who receives the ball earns receiving yards. The total of rushing yards and passing yards (but not receiving yards) is known as total offense. Although the ball may also be advanced by penalty, these yards do not contribute to total offense. Progress lost via quarterback sacks are classified differently, depending upon the league and/or level of football.

In the National Football League (NFL), the formula for a quarterback's total offense is:

$$Total Offense = Passing Yards + Rushing Yards - Sack Yards$$

When defenses are measured on total offense allowed, it is called total defense.

Some definitions of individual total offense give credit to both the passer and receiver for passing yards. Thus, if a quarterback catches a pass in a trick play, or a non-quarterback throws a pass, some statistical issues arise.

Steve McNair holds the NCAA career and single-season total offense/game records. Case Keenum, B. J. Symons, and David Klingler hold the total offense career, single-season and single game records.

In the NFL, Patrick Mahomes holds the single season record for total offense with 5,420 yards in 2022. Tom Brady holds the NFL's career record with 86,761 yards. Among active players, Aaron Rodgers leads the NFL in total offense with 67,527 yards.

== NCAA definition ==
The National Collegiate Athletic Association (NCAA) defines total offense as the total of net gain rushing and net gain forward passing: receiving and runback yards are not included in total offense. (at pg. 206).

== See also ==
- Glossary of American football
