= James Hadnot =

American football player (1957–2017)

No. 48
- Position: Running back

Personal information
- Born: July 11, 1957; Jasper, Texas, U.S.
- Died: March 30, 2017 (aged 59); Lubbock, Texas, U.S.
- Listed height: 6 ft 2 in (1.88 m)
- Listed weight: 244 lb (111 kg)

Career information
- High school: Jasper (TX)
- College: Texas Tech
- NFL draft: 1980: 3rd round, 66th overall pick

Career history
- Kansas City Chiefs (1980–1983); Los Angeles Raiders (1984)*; San Antonio Gunslingers (1985)
- * Offseason or practice squad member only

Awards and highlights
- Second-team All-American (1979); Third-team All-American (1978); SWC Offensive Player of the Year (1978); First-team All-SWC (1978)

Career NFL statistics
- Rushing yards: 1,029
- Rushing average: 3.9
- Touchdowns: 5
- Stats at Pro Football Reference

James Weldon Hadnot (July 11, 1957 – March 30, 2017) was an American professional football player who was a running back for four seasons for the Kansas City Chiefs in the National Football League (NFL). In his first two years of college football at Texas Tech Hadnot played tight end where he was a capable pass-catcher and solid blocker. In need of a running back, coach Rex Dockery switched his big receiver to fullback. Running from the veer formation, Hadnot used his considerable size and surprising speed to rush for a school record 1,369 yards as a junior in 1978, then 1,371 yards as a senior, leading the Southwest Conference both years. He was selected to the 1978 College Football All-America Team (2nd team). He was also chosen Southwest Conference offensive player of the year in both 1978 and 1979.

During his spectacular 1979 season at Texas Tech and in his subsequent Hula Bowl and Senior Bowl appearances, NFL scouts from the Kansas City Chiefs had taken notice of Hadnot's speed and power. They made him their third round pick in the 1980 NFL draft. In his rookie year he made a solid contribution alternating time with Tony Reed and Horace Belton at running back. Hadnot took over the starting fullback position in 1981, leading the way for the dazzling Joe Delaney while contributing 603 yards rushing and 215 yards receiving of his own. In addition to his four-year NFL career with the Chiefs, Hadnot caught 19 passes for 214 yards at tight end for the San Antonio Gunslingers of the USFL in 1985.

After retirement from football, Hadnot returned to his beloved college town of Lubbock where he resided until his death. In 2005, he was enshrined in the Texas Tech Athletic Hall of Honor.

Hadnot died on March 30, 2017.

== See also ==
- Texas Tech Red Raiders football statistical leaders
