= Lloyd Hill (American football) =

American football player (born 1972)

Profile
- Position: Wide receiver

Personal information
- Born: January 16, 1972 (age 54); Odessa, Texas, U.S.
- Listed height: 6 ft 1 in (1.85 m)
- Listed weight: 189 lb (86 kg)

Career information
- High school: Permian (Odessa)
- College: Texas Tech
- NFL draft: 1994: 6th round, 170th overall pick

Career history
- Chicago Bears (1994)*; Texas Terror/Houston Thunderbears (1996–1999); New England Sea Wolves (1999)
- * Offseason or practice squad member only

Awards and highlights
- First-team All-American (1992); SWC Offensive Player of the Year (1992); 2× First-team All-SWC (1992, 1993)

Career AFL statistics
- Receptions: 115
- Receiving yards: 1,438
- Receiving TDs: 24
- Tackles: 71
- Interceptions: 5
- Stats at ArenaFan.com

Lloyd Hill (born January 16, 1972) is an American former professional football player. He played college football for the Texas Tech Red Raiders, earning first-team All-American honors in 1992. He was selected in the sixth round of the 1994 NFL draft by the Chicago Bears. Hill is the older brother of Roy Williams.

Pre-draft measurables
Height	Weight	Arm length	Hand span
6 ft 0 3/4 in (1.85 m)	190 lb (86 kg)	32 1/2 in (0.83 m)	8 3/4 in (0.22 m)
