= Robert Hall (gridiron football) =

American gridiron football player (born 1970)

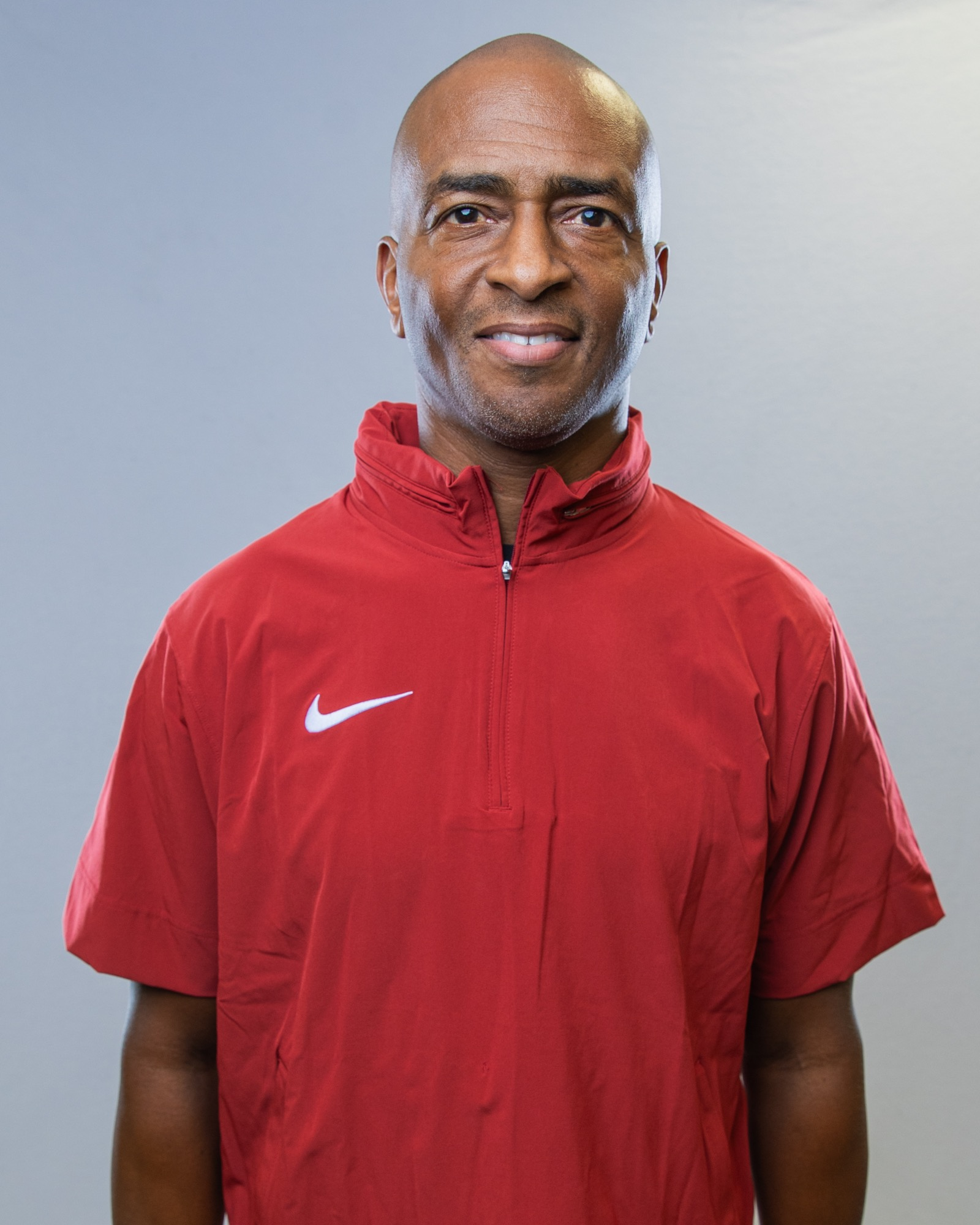
- Hall at Keller Highschool

Profile
- Position: Quarterback / Wide receiver

Personal information
- Born: December 30, 1970 (age 55); Dallas, Texas, U.S.
- Listed height: 6 ft 0 in (1.83 m)
- Listed weight: 180 lb (82 kg)

Career information
- High school: Dallas (TX) Carter
- College: Texas Tech
- NFL draft: 1994: undrafted

Career history
- Shreveport Pirates (1994); Texas Terror / Houston ThunderBears (1996–2000); Houston Outlaws (1999); Grand Rapids Rampage (2001–2002)*; Indiana Firebirds (2002); Carolina Cobras (2003); Grand Rapids Rampage (2004)
- * Offseason or practice squad member only

Awards and highlights
- First-team All-SWC (1993); Texas Tech Athletic Hall of Fame

Career AFL statistics
- Passing TDs–INTs: 127–30
- Passing yards: 8,145
- Rushing TD's: 20
- Receiving TD's: 54
- Stats at ArenaFan.com

Robert Hall (born December 30, 1970) is an American football quarterback and wide receiver who played in the Canadian Football League (CFL) and Arena Football League (AFL). As of 1/22/25, he is the offensive coordinator for Hebron High school.

== Career ==
Hall played for the Shreveport Pirates of the CFL, and the Texas Terror / Houston ThunderBears, Indiana Firebirds, Carolina Cobras and Grand Rapids Rampage of the AFL. He also played for the Houston Outlaws in the short-lived Regional Football League in 1999. Hall played college football at Texas Tech. Originally a walk-on, he was selected to the Texas Tech Athletic Hall of Fame in 2008.
