= Mickey Peters =

American football player (born 1980)

Profile
- Position: Wide receiver/defensive back

Personal information
- Born: August 17, 1980 (age 46); Mineral Wells, Texas, U.S.
- Listed height: 6 ft 2 in (1.88 m)
- Listed weight: 203 lb (92 kg)

Career information
- High school: Weatherford (Weatherford, Texas)
- College: Texas Tech (1999–2003)
- NFL draft: 2004: undrafted

Career history
- Tennessee Titans (2004)*; Tampa Bay Storm (2006)
- * Offseason or practice squad member only
- Stats at ArenaFan.com

Mickey Peters (born August 17, 1980) is an American former football player. He played college football as a tight end for the Texas Tech Red Raiders. He played professionally in the Arena Football League with the Tampa Bay Storm as a wide receiver/defensive back.
