= Bam Morris =

American football player (born 1972)

No. 33, 39, 32
- Position: Running back

Personal information
- Born: January 13, 1972 (age 54); Cooper, Texas, U.S.
- Listed height: 6 ft 4 in (1.93 m)
- Listed weight: 259 lb (117 kg)

Career information
- High school: Cooper
- College: Texas Tech
- NFL draft: 1994: 3rd round, 91st overall pick

Career history
- Pittsburgh Steelers (1994–1995); Baltimore Ravens (1996–1997); Chicago Bears (1998); Kansas City Chiefs (1998–1999); Orlando Predators (2006)*; Katy Copperheads (2006)
- * Offseason or practice squad member only

Awards and highlights
- Doak Walker Award (1993); Second-team All-American (1993); SWC Offensive Player of the Year (1993); First-team All-SWC (1993); Second-team All-SWC (1992)

Career NFL statistics
- Rushing yards: 3,809
- Rushing average: 3.9
- Receptions: 103
- Receiving yards: 790
- Return yards: 140
- Total touchdowns: 36
- Stats at Pro Football Reference
- Stats at ArenaFan.com

Byron "Bam" Morris (born January 13, 1972) is an American former professional football player who was a running back for the Pittsburgh Steelers, Chicago Bears, Baltimore Ravens, and the Kansas City Chiefs of the National Football League (NFL).

== Early life ==
Morris attended Texas Tech University where he won the 1993 Doak Walker Award as the top running back in college football. Among other accomplishments while playing for the Red Raiders, Morris was ranked second in the nation in rushing yards per game in 1993. He was selected by the Pittsburgh Steelers with the 91st overall pick in the 1994 NFL draft (3rd round). His older brother Ron Morris played for the Chicago Bears and collegiately at Southern Methodist University (SMU). Their older brother J.C. Morris played college football at Texas Christian University (TCU).

== Professional career ==
Morris was selected by the Pittsburgh Steelers in the third round of the 1994 NFL draft with the 91st overall pick. During his NFL career, he recorded 3,809 yards on 974 attempts and scored 35 touchdowns during 75 games. He also caught 103 passes for 790 yards and one touchdown. He was the leading rusher for the Steelers in their Super Bowl XXX loss to the Cowboys, gaining 73 yards on 19 carries and a touchdown.

== NFL career statistics ==
Legend
| **Bold** | Career high |

=== Regular season ===
| Year | Team | Games | | Rushing | | | | | Receiving | | | | |
| Year | Team | GP | GS | Att | Yds | Avg | Lng | TD | Rec | Yds | Avg | Lng | TD |
|---|---|---|---|---|---|---|---|---|---|---|---|---|---|
| 1994 | PIT | 15 | 6 | 198 | **836** | 4.2 | 20 | 7 | 22 | 204 | 9.3 | 49 | 0 |
| 1995 | PIT | 13 | 4 | 148 | 559 | 3.8 | 30 | **9** | 8 | 36 | 4.5 | 13 | 0 |
| 1996 | BAL | 11 | 7 | 172 | 737 | **4.3** | 19 | 4 | 25 | **242** | **9.7** | **52** | **1** |
| 1997 | BAL | 11 | 8 | **204** | 774 | 3.8 | 25 | 4 | **29** | 176 | 6.1 | 15 | 0 |
| 1998 | CHI | 2 | 0 | 3 | 8 | 2.7 | 6 | 0 | 0 | 0 | 0.0 | 0 | 0 |
| 1998 | KAN | 10 | 5 | 129 | 481 | 3.7 | **38** | 8 | 12 | 95 | 7.9 | 29 | 0 |
| 1999 | KAN | 12 | 8 | 120 | 414 | 3.5 | 24 | 3 | 7 | 37 | 5.3 | 9 | 0 |
| | | 74 | 38 | 974 | 3,809 | 3.9 | 38 | 35 | 103 | 790 | 7.7 | 52 | 1 |

=== Playoffs ===
| Year | Team | Games | | Rushing | | | | | Receiving | | | | |
| Year | Team | GP | GS | Att | Yds | Avg | Lng | TD | Rec | Yds | Avg | Lng | TD |
|---|---|---|---|---|---|---|---|---|---|---|---|---|---|
| 1994 | PIT | 2 | 0 | 24 | 62 | 2.6 | **17** | 0 | 1 | 0 | 0.0 | 0 | 0 |
| 1995 | PIT | 3 | 0 | **51** | **188** | **3.7** | 15 | **4** | **9** | **36** | **4.0** | **10** | 0 |
| | | 5 | 0 | 75 | 250 | 3.3 | 17 | 4 | 10 | 36 | 3.6 | 10 | 0 |

== Off-field issues ==
List of NCAA major college football yearly scoring leaders
