= 2003 Navy Midshipmen football team =

American college football season

2003 Navy Midshipmen football
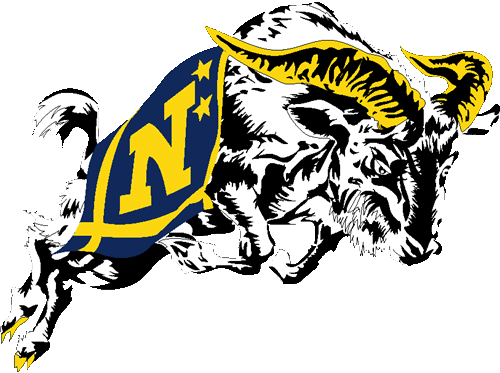

Houston Bowl, L 14–38 vs. Texas Tech
- Conference: Independent
- Record: 8–5
- Head coach: Paul Johnson (2nd season)
- Offensive scheme: Triple option
- Defensive coordinator: Buddy Green (2nd season)
- Base defense: Multiple
- MVP: Craig Candeto
- Captains: Craig Candeto; Eddie Carthan
- Home stadium: Navy–Marine Corps Memorial Stadium

2003 NCAA Division I-A independents football records
	Conf.			Overall
Team	W		L	W		L
Connecticut		–		9	–	3
Navy		–		8	–	5
Troy State		–		6	–	6
Notre Dame		–		5	–	7
Rankings from AP Poll

The 2003 Navy Midshipmen football team represented the United States Naval Academy (USNA) as an independent during the 2003 NCAA Division I-A football season. The team was led by second-year head coach Paul Johnson.

== Schedule ==
Date	Time	Opponent	Site	TV	Result	Attendance	Source
August 30		VMI	Navy–Marine Corps Memorial Stadium; Annapolis, MD		W 37–10	30,129	
September 6	7:00 p.m.	at No. 25 TCU	Amon G. Carter Stadium; Fort Worth, TX		L 3–17	35,688	
September 20	1:30 p.m.	Eastern Michigan	Navy–Marine Corps Memorial Stadium; Annapolis, MD		W 39–7	27,627	
September 27	7:00 p.m.	at Rutgers	Rutgers Stadium; Piscataway, NJ	ESPN+	L 27–48	32,382	
October 4	1:30 p.m.	Air Force	FedExField; Landover, MD (Commander-in-Chief's Trophy)	HDNet	W 28–25	30,623	
October 11	1:00 p.m.	at Vanderbilt	Vanderbilt Stadium; Nashville, TN		W 37–27	25,417	
October 18	3:00 p.m.	at Rice	Rice Stadium; Houston, TX		W 38–6	27,832	
October 25	1:30 p.m.	No. 3 (I-AA) Delaware	Navy–Marine Corps Memorial Stadium; Annapolis, MD	HDNet	L 17–21	34,982	
November 1	1:30 p.m.	Tulane	Navy–Marine Corps Memorial Stadium; Annapolis, MD	HDNet	W 35–17	27,417	
November 8	2:30 p.m.	at Notre Dame	Notre Dame Stadium; Notre Dame, IN (rivalry)	NBC	L 24–27	80,795	
November 22		Central Michigan	Navy–Marine Corps Memorial Stadium; Annapolis, MD		W 63–24		
December 6		vs. Army	Lincoln Financial Field; Philadelphia, PA (Army–Navy Game)	CBS	W 34–6		
December 30	4:30 p.m.	vs. Texas Tech	Reliant Stadium; Houston, TX (Houston Bowl)	ESPN	L 14–38	51,068	
Rankings from AP Poll released prior to the game; All times are in Eastern time

== Roster ==
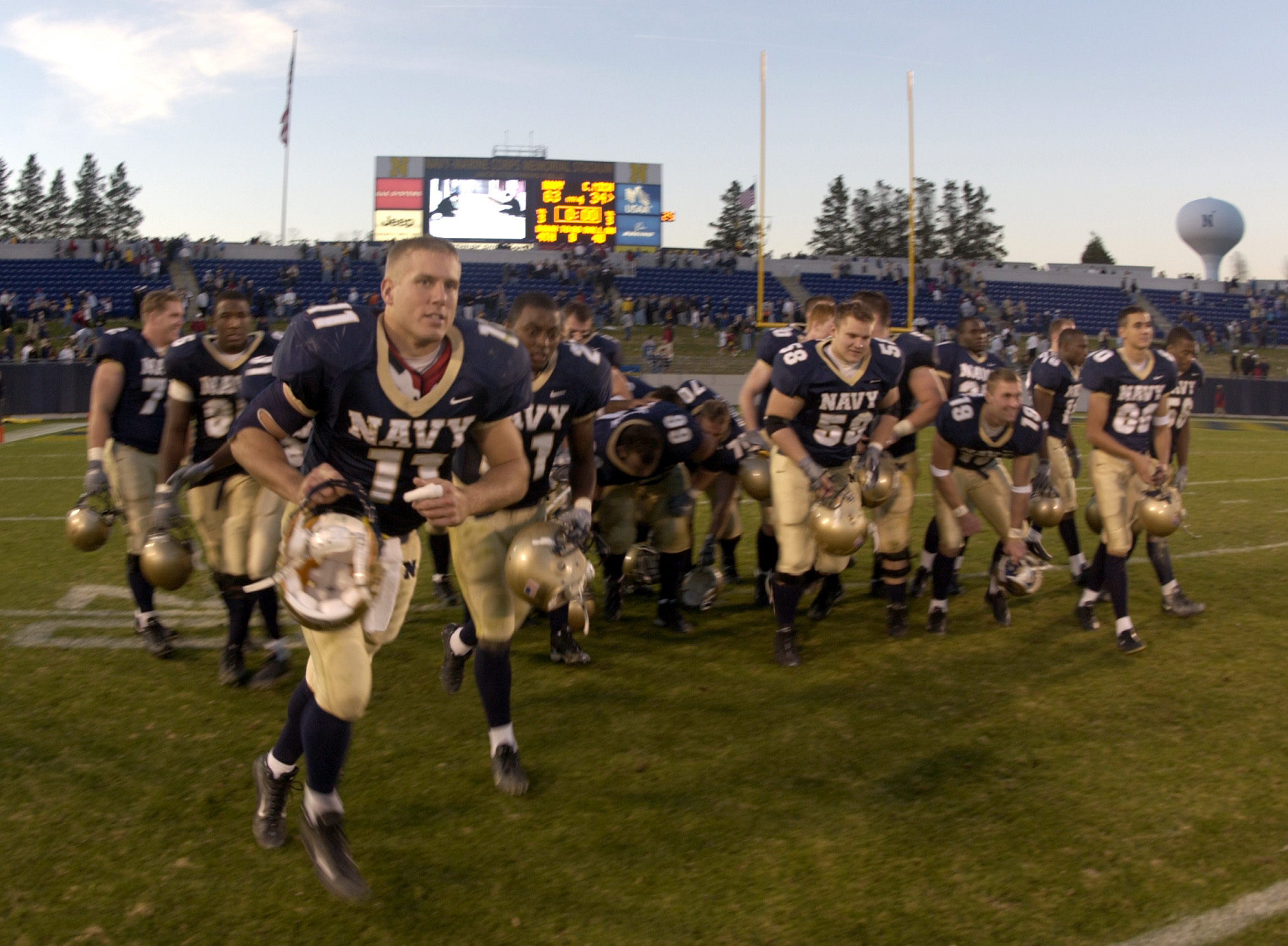
Seniors on the 2003 Navy team leaving the field after their final home game

2003 Navy Midshipmen football team roster
Players			Coaches
Offense: Pos. / # / Name / Class; QB / 11 / Craig Candeto / Sr	Defense: Pos. / # / Name / Class	Special teams: Pos. / # / Name / Class	Head coach: Paul Johnson; Coordinators/assistant coaches: Brian Bohannon (wide receivers); Legend: (C) Team captain; (S) Suspended; (I) Ineligible; Injured; Redshirt; Roster
