= The Planet Internet Services =

Computer server company

- Type: Private
- Industry: Hosting
- Founded: 1998
- Founder: Peter Pathos
- Defunct: November 15, 2010
- Fate: Merged
- Successor: SoftLayer
- Headquarters: Houston, Texas
- Key people: Douglas J. Erwin, Chairman and CEO
- Products: Dedicated Hosting, Managed Services
- Website: theplanet.com

The Planet was a privately held dedicated server company based in Texas. In May 2006, the company merged with Everyone's Internet, which used the EV1 Servers brand. In 2010, they merged with SoftLayer. All services provided by both companies were then operated under the SoftLayer name.

== History ==
The Planet's support system was called Orbit and was located at orbit.theplanet.com. Prior to the merger with EV1, The Planet operated under several different brands. They included: "Server Matrix", which served the low-price end of the market; "Total Control", which featured servers with complete remote control, such as Dell DRAC and Remote Console capabilities;

Orbit was the main way customers knew they were dealing with The Planet as a company rather than with one of the different brands they operated. The Planet then sold servers almost exclusively through their website rather than different brands which had been unified into their website.

On November 10, 2010, GI Partners announced that the merger of The Planet and SoftLayer was effective. On November 16, 2010, The Planet was rebranded SoftLayer as part of the merger. On June 4, 2013, IBM announced its acquisition of SoftLayer.

== Everyone's Internet ==
Everyone's Internet was originally a Houston, Texas-based internet service provider. It was formed on October 6, 1998 by Robert A. Marsh, Roy Marsh III, and Randy Williams. Its service was available nationwide.

Since 2000, Everyone's Internet's focus shifted toward Web hosting through its EV1 Servers subsidiary. This company was a dedicated server hosting market. At its peak in 2006, EV1 Servers hosted over 30,000 servers.

In May 2006, private equity firm GI Partners bought a controlling investment in Everyone's Internet. At the same time, Everyone's Internet announced that it was merging with The Planet, in which GI Partners had invested.

The CEO of EV1 Servers was Doug Erwin, from GI Partners, after they gained control of EV1 Servers.

In October 2006, Everyone's Internet announced that it would stop providing dial-up Internet access starting November 12 and sold their dialup portion of the company to PeoplePC, another dialup Internet service provider. Some users were upset because PeoplePC requires a dialer, which does not work on all operating systems, and therefore opted to move to other Internet service providers.

As of January 2007 the EV1 name was dropped following the merger of The Planet and EV1.

On May 21, 2008, a major explosion caused by failing electrical equipment knocked down several walls in one of the former EV1Servers legacy H1 datacenters.

== EV1 and SCO licensing controversy ==
On March 1, 2004, EV1Servers.Net announced it had licensed SCO Group's alleged intellectual property, saying that it was looking to offer its customers stability in the wake of SCO's protracted battle with the open source community. However, the deal was perceived by Linux users as using a licensing deal to support SCO Group's lawsuit against Linux. On March 25, 2004, Netcraft reported EV1 had lost 1,080 Web sites in the previous 30 days. Robert Marsh, CEO of Everyones Internet, said that although EV1 had lost some hosting business since the deal, it was not out of line with the number of sites EV1 loses in a typical month.

A Utah court document filed on April 5, 2006, revealed that Robert Marsh, co-founder and CEO of EV1, was misled by SCO's Philip Langer's claims when making the deal, and that EV1 paid $800,000 for the license.
