= Joel Filani =

American football player and coach (born 1983)

Abilene Christian Wildcats
- Title: Co-offensive coordinator/wide receivers

Personal information
- Born: December 8, 1983 (age 42); Tempe, Arizona, U.S.
- Listed height: 6 ft 2 in (1.88 m)
- Listed weight: 216 lb (98 kg)

Career information
- High school: Phoenix (AZ) Paradise Valley
- College: Texas Tech
- NFL draft: 2007: 6th round, 188th overall pick

Career history

Playing
- Tennessee Titans (2007)*; Minnesota Vikings (2007–2008)*; Seattle Seahawks (2008)*; Detroit Lions (2008)*; St. Louis Rams (2008–2009)*; Tampa Bay Buccaneers (2009)*; California Redwoods (2009); San Jose SaberCats (2011)*; Chicago Rush (2011)
- * Offseason or practice squad member only

Coaching
- Boise State (2013–2014) Graduate assistant; Washington State (2015) Offensive quality control coach; North Texas (2016–2018) Wide receivers coach; Texas Tech (2019–2021) Wide receivers coach; Northern Arizona (2022–2023) Wide receivers coach/pass game coordinator; Northern Iowa (2024) Offensive coordinator/wide receivers coach; Abilene Christian (2025–present) Co-offensive coordinator/wide receivers coach

Awards and highlights
- 2× First-team All-Big 12 (2005, 2006)

Career AFL statistics
- Receptions: 3
- Receiving yards: 31
- Stats at ArenaFan.com

Joel O. Filani (born December 8, 1983) is an American former professional football wide receiver and current co-offensive coordinator and wide receivers coach for the Abilene Christian Wildcats. He was selected by the Tennessee Titans in the sixth round of the 2007 NFL draft. He played college football at Texas Tech.

Filani was also a member of the Minnesota Vikings, Seattle Seahawks, Detroit Lions, St. Louis Rams, Tampa Bay Buccaneers, California Redwoods, San Jose SaberCats and Chicago Rush.

== Early life ==
Filani attended Paradise Valley High School in Phoenix, Arizona and was a student and a letterman in football. In football, he was named to the First-team All-Arizona as a senior when he caught 40 passes for 653 yards and eight touchdowns and also rushed for 559 yards and five touchdowns on 62 attempts and ran up 623 yards and four touchdowns on 16 kickoff returns. In addition to Texas Tech, Filani was recruited by Washington State and Colorado State.

== College career ==
At Texas Tech, he redshirted in 2002. In 2003, he played in all 13 games and finished the season with one reception for nine yards. In 2004, he caught 12 passes for 310 yards and two touchdowns and led the team with 17.2 yards per reception In 2005, he was First-team All-Big 12 catching 65 passes for 1,007 yards with a 15.5-yard average and 8 touchdowns. In 2006, Filani was again First-team All-Big 12 after catching 91 passes for 1,300 yards for a 14.3-yards per catch and 13 touchdowns.

== Professional career ==
Pre-draft measurables
Height	Weight	40-yard dash	10-yard split	20-yard split	20-yard shuttle	Three-cone drill	Vertical jump	Broad jump	Bench press
6 ft 2 1/8 in (1.88 m)	211 lb (96 kg)	4.55 s	1.63 s	2.66 s	4.10 s	6.81 s	32 1/2 in (0.83 m)	9 ft 9 in (2.97 m)	17 reps
Shuttle and cone drill from Pro Day, all other values from NFL Combine.

=== Tennessee Titans ===
He was drafted by the Tennessee Titans in the sixth round of the 2007 NFL draft with the 188th overall pick.

=== Tampa Bay Buccaneers ===
Filani was signed by the Tampa Bay Buccaneers on May 13, 2009. He was waived and subsequently placed on injured reserve on August 19. Filani was released with an injury settlement the following day.

== Coaching career ==
=== Boise State ===
In 2013, Filani began his coaching career at Boise State working as a graduate assistant for the Broncos.

=== Washington State ===
In 2015, Filani was hired by his former coach Mike Leach to become an offensive quality assistant at Washington State University.

=== North Texas ===
From 2016 to 2018, Filani served as the wide receivers coach for the North Texas Mean Green.

=== Texas Tech ===
In 2019, he joined the coaching staff of his alma mater where he worked as the wide receivers coach. He was not retained after the 2021 season.

=== Washington State (second stint) ===
On January 3, 2022 Filani was named wide receivers coach at Washington State, joining the staff of first-year head coach Jake Dickert. Filani returns to the Palouse, one month after former Red Raiders teammate Eric Morris was named as the Cougs new offensive coordinator.
