= 2003 Houston Bowl =

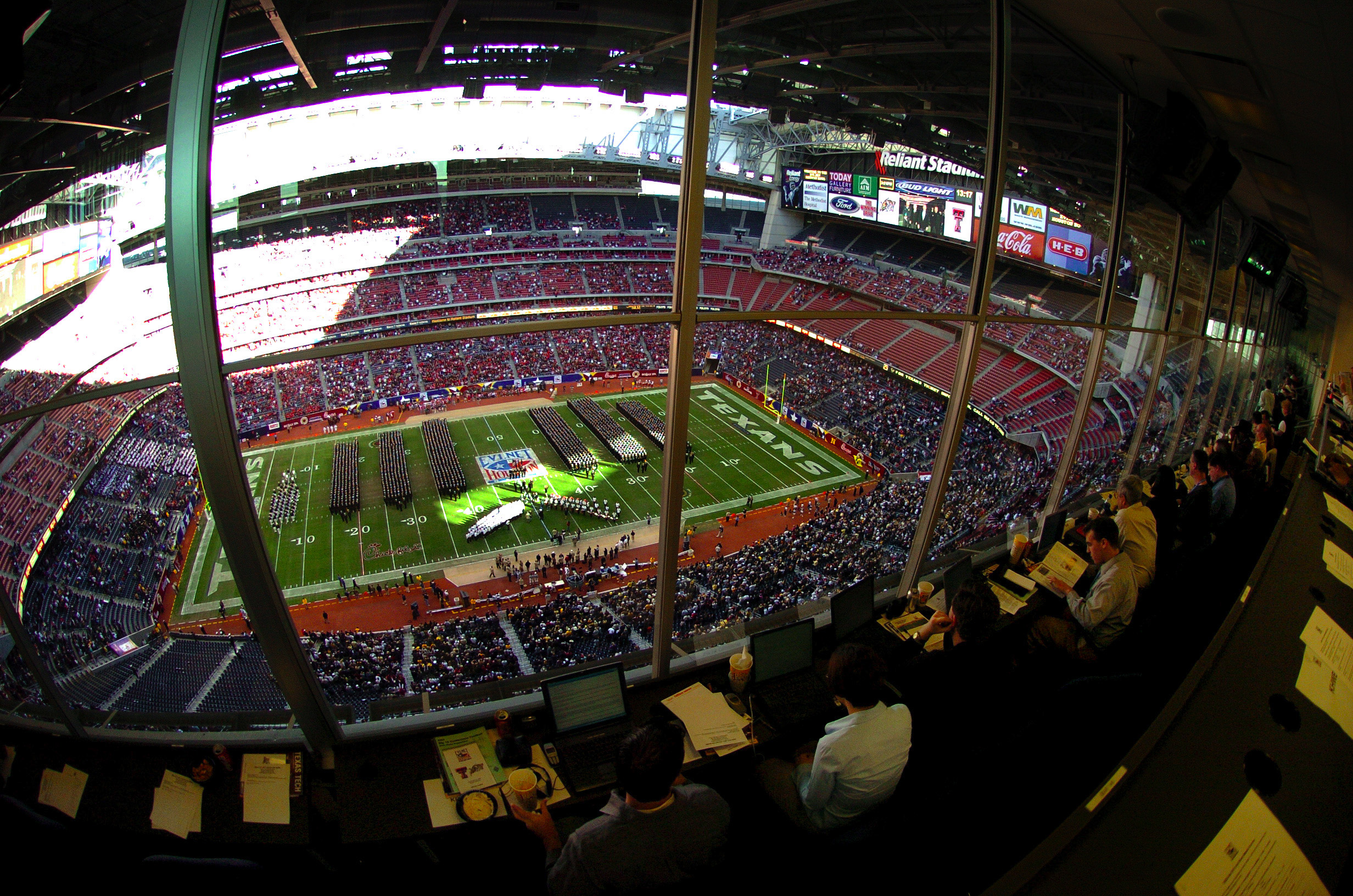
Navy Midshipmen	Texas Tech Red Raiders
(8–4)	(7–5)
Independent	Big 12
14	38
Head coach: Paul Johnson	Head coach: Mike Leach
	1	2	3	4	Total
Navy	0	0	7	7	14
Texas Tech	0	14	10	14	38
- Date: December 30, 2003
- Season: 2003
- Stadium: Reliant Stadium
- Location: Houston, Texas
- Referee: Jack Folliard (Pac-10)

United States TV coverage
- Network: ESPN

The 2003 Houston Bowl was a post-season college football bowl game between the Navy Midshipmen and the Texas Tech Red Raiders on December 30, 2003, at Reliant Stadium in Houston, Texas. It was the fourth time the Houston Bowl was played and the final game of the 2003 NCAA Division I FBS football season for both teams. Texas Tech defeated Navy 38–14.

The Houston Bowl was Navy's first bowl game since the 1996 Aloha Bowl, in which Navy defeated California 42–38. Texas Tech, representing the Big 12 conference, was playing in its fourth straight bowl game, stretching back to the inaugural Houston Bowl (then the Galleryfurniture.com Bowl) on December 27, 2000.
