= Comeback (sports) =

Sports phenomenon

A comeback (or come-from-behind) is an occurrence of an athlete or sports team engaged in a competition overcoming a disadvantage in points, position, or series. It has been described as "the single greatest aspect of competition that most embodies the spirit of what makes sport extraordinary". It has been observed in spectator sports that "dramatic play seems to involve both players; cheering would often escalate when one player gained momentum, and then his/her opponent suddenly turned the tables and made a comeback", with such a result drawing more enthusiasm than one competitor defeating the other without giving up any points. Fans are likely to feel better about a team that loses after staging a "comeback that fell just short" than a team that lost by the same score after having played evenly throughout the match and then allowed the other team the winning score at the end.

In some sports, particularly those regulated by a game clock, the time that it takes to score points makes a comeback impossible when there is too great a point disadvantage to overcome in the time remaining. It has been noted, however, that in "some sports, such as tennis or baseball, a comeback is possible until the very last point, regardless of what the deficit might be". Many sporting news outlets have compiled lists of "greatest comebacks" for various sports.

Some academic study of sports comebacks has been conducted. One study indicated that in the sports of basketball, football and ice hockey, the team leading in points at the beginning of the final period of play wins the game 80% of the time, with the trailing team overcoming this disadvantage 20% of the time. Another determined that the home team advantage has a significant impact on the probability of a team engineering a late comeback, noting that for professional basketball teams, "the home team is more than three times as likely to make a fourth-quarter comeback than is the visiting team (33.3% versus 10.5%)". A comeback by one competitor may coincide with, or be alternatively characterized, as a "choke" by the opponent allowing the comeback.

The term "comeback" can also refer to performers returning to (or attempting to return to) their former level of competition after an adverse event that seems to threaten their careers and/or a lengthy period of absence, whether that hiatus was caused by voluntary retirement, injury, other medical reason and/or some other circumstance(s). Use of the term in this context can also be found in fields such as politics and the entertainment industry, in addition to sports.

== American football ==
There is no official definition or statistic for comebacks in American football, but many fans note the ability of certain teams to mount a comeback late in the game. A team may have a second-half comeback after having fallen well behind in the first half, or a fourth-quarter comeback after having fallen well behind with only one quarter of play remaining.

Certain comebacks are particularly historically significant. For example, in American football, "The Comeback" refers to a specific NFL playoff game between the Buffalo Bills and the Houston Oilers played on January 3, 1993. It featured the Bills recovering from a 32-point deficit shortly after halftime to win in overtime, 41–38, the largest comeback in terms of points (at that time) in NFL history, postseason or regular season. This has been referred to as "the greatest comeback in NFL history". The record was later broken by the 2022-23 Vikings in a Week 15 game coming back from a 33 point deficit at halftime and later scored 32 unanswered points outscoring their opponent, the Indianapolis Colts 39–3, breaking the 1992-93 Bills record for either playoffs or regular season. Another prominent example of a comeback came in Super Bowl LI, played on February 5, 2017, where the New England Patriots, down by 25 points (28–3) in the third quarter, would eventually defeat the Atlanta Falcons in overtime, 34–28, for its second championship title in three years. The Patriots' 25-point comeback was the largest in Super Bowl history.

The 2006 Michigan State vs. Northwestern football game featured the largest comeback in NCAA Division I-A history, when the Michigan State Spartans rallied to score 38 unanswered points to beat the Northwestern Wildcats 41–38 after falling behind 38–3 with 9:54 left in the 3rd quarter.

In the 2006 Insight Bowl, the Texas Tech Red Raiders completed the largest comeback in NCAA Division I-A Bowl Game history. The Minnesota Golden Gophers led 38–7 with 7:47 left in the 3rd quarter. Texas Tech quarterback Graham Harrell scored two touchdowns, running back Shannon Woods scored another TD, and kicker Alex Trlica hit the game-tying 52-yard field goal as time expired in regulation. Gophers quarterback Bryan Cupito led a drive capped off by a Joel Monroe field goal. Shannon Woods ended the game with a 3-yard rushing touchdown to complete the thrilling comeback.

In the 2016 Valero Alamo Bowl, the TCU Horned Frogs tied the aforementioned Texas Tech Red Raiders for the largest comeback in NCAA Division I-A Bowl Game history. The Oregon Ducks led 31–0 at halftime. The Ducks' star quarterback Vernon Adams Jr. left the game with an injury. TCU backup QB Bram Kohlhausen (who was playing for starter Trevone Boykin as he was suspended for off-the-field issues) led an unbelievable 31-point second half to tie the game. The Frogs ended up winning the game 47–41 in 3OT after the Ducks failed to convert on 4th Down. In 1994, a college football game known as the Choke at Doak between the Florida Gators and Florida State Seminoles tied the NCAA record for the biggest fourth-quarter comeback at 28 points.

The largest fourth-quarter comeback in the history of the NFL came in Week 9 of the 1987 NFL season, as the St. Louis Cardinals came back from a 28-3 deficit with 12:42 remaining in the final quarter, scoring 28 straight points on top of the Tampa Bay Buccaneers' defense to take a 31-28 lead with 2:01 remaining in the game; a field goal attempt from the Buccaneers' kicker Donald Igwebuike struck the crossbar as the game clock expired, that 25-point difference remaining the largest comeback in just the fourth quarter in NFL history.

== Association football ==
The ability for a comeback to occur in association football is limited by the game clock of 90 minutes per match. Association football often settles knockout rounds using two-legged ties, in which the second leg can be described as a comeback for the winner of the tie if they had lost the first leg.

A notable example of such a comeback happened on 21 December 1957. With 27 minutes left, Charlton Athletic F.C. were losing 5–1 to Huddersfield Town A.F.C. and down to ten men. However, they scored six more goals to win 7–6.

Another example is Liverpool's comeback against AC Milan in the 2005 UEFA Champions League final in which Liverpool came back from a 3–0 deficit in the first half after scoring three goals in 7 minutes to make it 3–3, eventually winning the match 3–2 on penalties. The match was later dubbed 'The Miracle of Istanbul'.

An example of a record breaking comeback is FC Barcelona (6–1, 6–5 on aggregate) against Paris Saint-Germain F.C. in the UEFA Champions League round of 16 on March 8, 2017 at Camp Nou, Barcelona. It was the first time in UEFA Champions League history that a team had overcome a four-goal deficit in order to qualify for the quarter-finals. Other example include FC Barcelona (5–1, 6–4 on aggregate) against Chelsea F.C. in the UEFA Champions League quarterfinal on April 18, 2000 at Camp Nou. Barcelona entered the second leg with a 3-1 deficit against Chelsea, Rivaldo and Luís Figo both scored in the first half to tie the aggregate score 3-3, However in the 60th minute, Tore André Flo scored to make the aggregate score 4-3 for Chelsea, but in the 83rd minute, Dani García equalized to make the tie 4–4 on aggregate and sent the game to extra time where Rivaldo and Patrick Kluivert scored for Barcelona to complete the comeback and win the tie 6-4.

Other comebacks also include Liverpool F.C (FC Barcelona 0–4 Liverpool FC, 4–3 on aggregate) against FC Barcelona in the 2018–19 UEFA Champions League Semi-finals. With Liverpool being down 3–0 after the first game, Divock Origi and Georginio Wijnaldum came to the rescue as both netted two goals each, and an extraordinary corner kick from Trent Alexander-Arnold would give the Reds a 4–3 lead on aggregate, sending them through to the 2019 UEFA Champions League Final, which they would later win. In the other semi-final, contested between Tottenham Hotspur and Ajax, another great comeback occurred, as with Ajax having won their away leg 1–0, and winning their home leg 2–0 at half-time, Spurs needed to score three goals in the second half to win the game, where Lucas Moura scored a hat-trick that sent them to their first UEFA Champions League Final on away goals, with the winning goal coming in the 96th minute.

Real Madrid completed three successful comebacks in the 2021–22 UEFA Champions League knockout phase. In the Round of 16, Paris Saint-Germain F.C. led Real in the aggregate score 2–0 with about 30 minutes left to be played. Karim Benzema made a hat-trick in just 17 minutes to take the Spanish side to the next round. Later in the quarter-finals, after defeating Chelsea Football Club 1–3 at Stamford Bridge on the first leg with another hat-trick by Benzema, Madrid allowed three goals in the second leg at home to lose the advantage and fall behind 4–3 on aggregate. However, Rodrygo made a late goal in the 80th minute to even the aggregate, assisted by Luka Modrić, and in the subsequent extra time, Benzema scored with a header once more to help his team to reach the semi-finals. In this round, after losing 4–3 to Manchester City at the City of Manchester Stadium, Riyad Mahrez scored late in the second half of the second leg to put City 5-3 ahead and appear to secure a place in the final for City, however, Rodrygo made a double in the 90th and 91st minutes to equal the tie at 5-5 on aggregate. In extra time, Benzema successfully took a penalty in the 95th minute to put Real ahead on aggregate 6–5, allowing Madrid to reach the final, which they later won.

LASK advanced after a comeback. Although C. McGregor’s goal in the second legged of Celtic F.C. led against LASK make a 4–0 lead, Florian Flecker’s 90th minute 4–4 goal brought the match to extra time of the 2026–27 UEFA Champions League qualifying Play-off round and Samuel Adeniran’s second goal in 109 minutes make a 5–4 comeback for LASK to advance the league stage.

The biggest comeback in World Cup history is considered to be Portugal's 5–3 victory over North Korea in the 1966 quarter-final. North Korea stunned everyone by going up 3–0 in the first half, but Portugal, led by Eusébio, scored five goals (the first four by Eusébio) to turn the game around.

== Baseball ==
In baseball, a comeback is theoretically possible at any point in the game up until the event that ends the game itself. There are no time constraints that would prevent a team from using its very last opportunity for play to score enough consecutive runs to win the game (or to tie the game, forcing extra innings).

The 2004 American League Championship Series is called by many to be the "greatest comeback in sports history". The Boston Red Sox became the first, and to date, only team in MLB history to come back from a 3–0 series deficit and ultimately win a best-of-seven series. The Red Sox did so against their archrival, the New York Yankees, who defeated them 4–3 the year before in the 2003 ALCS. The Red Sox went on to sweep the 2004 World Series against the St. Louis Cardinals, ending the Red Sox's 86-year championship drought, colloquially known as "The Curse of the Bambino".

In terms of individual games, on three occasions in Major League Baseball history, a team has come back from being twelve runs down to win the game:

- June 18, 1911, the Detroit Tigers erased a 13–1 first inning deficit against the Chicago White Sox, claiming a 16–15 victory.
- June 15, 1925, the Philadelphia Athletics were trailing 15–3 in the sixth inning, before launching a 13-run explosion in the eighth, defeating the Cleveland Indians 17–15.
- August 5, 2001, the Cleveland Indians overcame a 14–2 deficit in the seventh inning against the Seattle Mariners, winning 15–14 in the 11th inning.

== Basketball ==
A team may have a second-half comeback after having fallen well behind in the first half, or a fourth-quarter comeback after having fallen well behind with only one quarter of play remaining.

=== NCAA ===
The greatest comeback in NCAA Division I history occurred on February 22, 2018 when Drexel overcame a 34-point deficit against Delaware. This surpassed the previous record, a February 1994 game between the Kentucky Wildcats and the Louisiana State University Tigers, in which the Wildcats were down by 31 points, but came back to win 99–95. In the Philippines, the San Miguel Beermen became the first basketball team in history to ever win a best-of-7 title series from 0–3 down after beating Alaska Aces in Game 7 of the 2015–16 PBA Philippine Cup Finals.

==== End of period ====
These comebacks happened at the end of regulation or the end of an overtime period in a short amount of time:

Date	Comeback By	Leader	Deficit	Time Remaining	Eventual Winner	Final score
01/08/2017	Nevada	New Mexico	14	1:03	Nevada	105–104 (OT)
03/20/2016	Texas A&M	Northern Iowa	12	0:34	Texas A&M	92–88 (2OT)
02/25/2023	Iowa	Michigan State	10	0:40	Iowa	112–106 (OT)
03/01/2018	Virginia	Louisville	4	0:00.9	Virginia	67–66

==== Long comebacks ====
Date	Comeback By	Leader	Deficit	Time Remaining	Eventual Winner	Final score
02/22/2018	Drexel	Delaware	34	22:35	Drexel	85–83
02/15/1994	Kentucky	LSU	31	15:34	Kentucky	99–95
02/17/2018	Michigan State	Northwestern	27	24:13	Michigan State	65–60
02/25/2023	Florida State	Miami	25	19:35	Florida State	85–84
03/13/2012	BYU	Iona	25	24:03	BYU	78–72
02/12/2019	Duke	Louisville	23	9:04	Duke	71–69
1/30/2023	Texas Tech	Iowa State	23	12:37	Texas Tech	80–77 (OT)

In the 2012 NCAA Division I men's basketball tournament, both games of the March 13 session set NCAA postseason records, for largest deficit overcome within the final five minutes of a game (16) and largest deficit at any point in the game overcome (25).

=== NBA ===
The greatest comeback in National Basketball Association play occurred on November 27, 1996, when the Utah Jazz, down by 36 points to the Denver Nuggets late in the second quarter (it was 70–36 at the half and 70–34 just before), overcame this deficit to win 107–103.

The post-season record comeback of 31 points was set on April 15, 2019, by the Los Angeles Clippers vs Golden State Warriors. The Los Angeles Clippers trailed 94–63 with 7:31 left in the 3rd quarter as Stephen Curry was benched for his 4th foul of the game. The Clippers cut it down to as much as 2 mid-way through the 4th quarter. Landry Shamet hit a game winning 3 pointer with 15.9 seconds left to give the Clippers a 133–131 lead. Lou Williams led the Clippers with 36 points in the comeback effort as Montrezl Harrell helped with 25 points as the 2nd leading scorer of the game and hit two free throws to seal the game. The Clippers won the game 135–131.

The record for an NBA Finals game, of 29 points, was set on June 10, 2026, in the San Antonio Spurs vs New York Knicks game. In the 2026 NBA Finals, the Knicks trailed by as much as 81-52 with 9:27 left in the third quarter. The Knicks cut the lead to 90-75 by the end of that quarter and eventually won the game 107–106 on OG Anunoby's tip-in with 1.2 seconds left, completing the largest comeback in NBA Finals history.

== Cricket ==
The ability for a comeback to occur in cricket is limited in all cases by the number of wickets and innings a team has left ("wickets" meaning the number of batsmen they have who have not yet been dismissed during their "innings", with each innings being a scoring turn for the team), and additionally either, in limited overs cricket, by the number of legal deliveries (periods of play) each team is allotted to score off of (with teams generally expected to score at most six runs per delivery), or in first-class cricket, the time limit.

=== Limited-overs cricket ===
In limited overs cricket, where the teams each get one innings, comebacks look significantly different than they do in other sports: this is because during the first half of the game, only one team (the "first-batting" team) is allowed to score, while in the second half of the game, either the game immediately ends when the other team (the "chasing" team) takes the lead (akin to baseball's walkoff), or the game is won/tied by the first-batting team, with only some games featuring tiebreakers. This means that anytime the chasing team wins a limited-overs match, they do so having never taken the lead until the end of the game; conversely, anytime the first-batting team wins, they do so having never trailed during the game. Comebacks in limited-overs cricket therefore have less to do with the actual lead or deficit teams have on the scoreboard, and more to do with how teams perform against the number of runs they are projected to score from their innings, which is generally determined by looking at their run rate and other factors. This means that the first-batting team can be said to "come back" during the second half of the game even though they are not the ones scoring, because the chasing team was initially scoring very quickly and appeared on target to take the lead, only to be defeated by a good defensive performance by the first-batting team which slowed down the chasing team's scoring rate and/or ended the chasing team's innings early.

==== Examples ====
One example of a limited-overs comeback came in the 1996 Cricket World Cup semi-final between Australia and the West Indies, with each team allotted 50 overs (50 sets of 6 legal deliveries). Australia had scored a total of 207 runs in the first half of the match, and the West Indies had gotten to 165 runs with nine overs (54 legal deliveries) remaining in the second half of the match, having lost only two wickets in the first 41 overs of their innings. This meant that the West Indies needed to score an average of 4.77 runs per remaining over (0.8 runs per remaining ball) to take the lead and win the game, with Australia able to win or at least tie the game if they could either complete the remaining nine overs while conceding less than 4.77 runs per remaining over, or take the remaining eight out of ten of the West Indies' wickets before the West Indies could take the lead. Australia was able to win by 5 runs by taking the latter path, only allowing the West Indies to score another 37 runs (reaching a final score of 202) for the loss of their final eight wickets. Had the West Indies not lost so many wickets, they would have had 3 deliveries remaining in the game to try to close the 5-run deficit.

=== First-class cricket ===
In first-class cricket, where the trailing team must complete two innings within the five-day time limit to lose, one type of "comeback" is when a trailing team manages to "salvage the draw"; this means that the trailing team's batsmen avoid getting out (being dismissed/losing their wickets), thus prolonging their innings long enough that time runs out and neither team wins or ties. Some notable instances of this occurring have been where certain batsman have batted for long periods of time, such as Hanif Mohammad's 16 hours of batting against the West Indies. A much rarer, but truer type of comeback can occur when a team wins after being forced to follow on; this means the winning team had been trailing by a significant (200+ run) margin after both teams had completed one of their innings, but managed to win after both teams had completed two innings. This has only happened four times in international cricket.

== Handball ==
=== EHF Champions League ===
In the 2015–16 EHF Champions League final, MVM Veszprem led Vive Targi Kielce 28–19 after 45 minutes of play. Kielce scored nine unanswered goals to win in the penalties 39–38.

== Ice hockey ==
The ability for a comeback to occur in ice hockey is limited by the game clock.

=== NHL ===
==== Regular season ====
The following regular season comebacks are the largest in NHL history, with each team having won after trailing by five goals:

- On February 25, 1983 the Boston Bruins led the Buffalo Sabres 6–1 with 14:03 left in the second period. The Sabres then scored six unanswered goals to win 7–6.
- On January 21, 1985, the Los Angeles Kings led the Edmonton Oilers 7–2 with 1:28 remaining in the second period. The Oilers then scored six unanswered goals to win 8–7.
- On January 26, 1987, the Calgary Flames erased a 5–0 deficit against the Toronto Maple Leafs, starting with a goal by Steve Bozek with only 13:58 remaining in the third period. To date, it is the largest comeback with the least amount of time remaining in NHL history.
- On December 30, 1989, the Toronto Maple Leafs were down 6–1 to the Boston Bruins, coming back with six unanswered goals to defeat the Bruins 7–6 in overtime. The comeback began on a Vincent Damphousse goal with 1:05 left in the second period.
- On December 26, 1991, the New York Rangers came back from a five-goal deficit against Washington Capitals, winning 8–6. The Rangers began the comeback on a goal by John Ogrodnick with one-tenth of a second left in the first period.
- On March 3, 1999, the Colorado Avalanche came back from five goals down against the Florida Panthers, winning the game 7–5. The Avalanche scored seven goals in the final 22 minutes, with Peter Forsberg leading the way with three goals and three assists.
- On November 29, 2000, the St. Louis Blues came back from a five-goal deficit against the Toronto Maple Leafs, winning 6–5 in overtime. The Maple Leafs led 5–0 with 15:09 remaining in the third period. Consequently, the Blues completed their comeback in the least amount of time.
- On February 19, 2008, Montreal Canadiens defeated the New York Rangers 6–5 in a shootout, having rallied down 5–0. Michael Ryder scored to begin the comeback with 12:32 left in the second period.
- On October 12, 2009, the Chicago Blackhawks defeated the Calgary Flames 6–5 in overtime, capping a five-goal comeback after being down 5–0. John Madden scored with 2:18 left in the first period to begin the comeback.

On November 3, 2026, the Winnipeg Jets defeated the Montreal Canadiens 5–4 in overtime. The Jets were trailing 4–0 in the 3rd period. Tyrel Bauer scored Winnipeg's first goal with 2:39 remaining, making this the first four-goal comeback in the final three minutes of regulation in NHL history.

==== Playoffs ====
The following playoff comeback is the largest in NHL history:

- On April 10, 1982, the Los Angeles Kings trailed the heavily-favored Edmonton Oilers 5–0 going into the third period of play in Game 3 of a best-of-five series. The Kings rallied to score 5 unanswered goals in the third period, and won the game 6–5 in overtime on a goal by Daryl Evans. The game was dubbed the Miracle on Manchester, referring to the Kings arena, The Forum, on Manchester Boulevard, and remains the largest single-game comeback in NHL playoff history.

In National Hockey League series play, four teams have won a series after being down 3–0. The 1942 Toronto Maple Leafs were the first to do so, the first and only team to win a Stanley Cup Final after being down 3–0. The other 3–0 comebacks were completed by the 1975 New York Islanders, the 2010 Philadelphia Flyers, and the 2014 Los Angeles Kings. After being down three games in their series against the San Jose Sharks, the Kings rallied and won the next four. This momentum seemingly carried them in the remainder of their series, culminating with their winning the Stanley Cup.

== Motorsport ==
In the 1985 Winston 500, Bill Elliott's car suffered a broken oil fitting and nearly went two laps off of the pace. Elliott was able to make up the near two lap difference without the aid of a caution flag or the draft, winning the race by over a second.

In the 1995 Indianapolis 500, Jacques Villeneuve overtook the pace car by mistake and was penalized with two laps, but recovered and won the race.

During the 2011 Canadian Grand Prix, Jenson Button fell to last place on lap 37 after a collision during a torrential downpour. Over the following 33 laps, Button managed to climb through the field in a recovery drive that culminated in his catching up to the leader, Sebastian Vettel and after an error, Button overtook him on the last lap to win.

Sebastian Vettel won the 2012 Formula One World Championship at Brazil by recovering from a spin on lap 1 to finish 6th and secure the title.

Sergio Pérez was due to retire at the conclusion of the 2020 Formula One World Championship as he was without a contract, and having raced 190 times, he had never claimed a win. After a first lap collision that saw him in last place, the Mexican driver clawed his way through the field to take first place, scoring his first ever win and (in part) securing a new contract with Red Bull Racing for 2021. At 190 races, Perez broke the record for the longest career without a win.

In the 2021 São Paulo Grand Prix, Lewis Hamilton was Disqualified from qualifying, and sent to the back of the grid. During the sprint, he would catch up to 5th place, however would receive a 5 place grid penalty and started the race in 10th, over the next 71 laps, he would catch up to Max Verstappen, the race leader, before overtaking him at lap 57, to take home his 101st win and his 3rd at the Brazilian Grand Prix.

== Tennis ==
In professional tennis, the match goes to the first player to win a predetermined number of sets, usually two or three in professional tournaments. There have been numerous instances of a player being down one or two sets to none and coming back to win the remaining sets in a row to win the match. It is theoretically possible for a player to come back from a deficit at any point during the match.

In the 1987 Wimbledon Championships, Jimmy Connors faced Mikael Pernfors in the fourth round. Connors lost the first two sets and was down 4–1 in the third set, before taking 14 straight points and winning the set. Pernfors then took a 3–0 lead in the fourth set, but Connors subsequently broke Pernfors twice to win the fourth set. Connors then won the fifth and deciding set to win the match.

In the 1995 French Open, Jana Novotná faced Chanda Rubin in the third round. Rubin won the first set after a tie-break, but lost the second set 6–4. In the deciding third set, she was down 5–0, and in the sixth game was 0–40 to Novotná. Rubin broke, and despite her opponent having nine match points, she won the match after a second tie-break.

In the 1999 French Open final between Andre Agassi and Andrei Medvedev, Medvedev dominated the first two sets (1–6, 2–6) before Agassi mounted a come-from-behind victory, winning the remaining three sets (6–4, 6–3, 6–4) which allowed him to complete a career Grand Slam.

In the 2022 Australian Open final between Rafael Nadal and Daniil Medvedev, Medvedev went up two sets (2-6 in the first, 6-7(5-7) in the second) until Nadal managed to complete a comeback, winning the next three sets 6–4, 6–4, 7–5, in 5 hours and 24 minutes to win his second Australian Open title. With this victory, he completed the Double Career Grand Slam, and won a then all-time record 21st major men's singles title.

In the 2025 French Open final between Carlos Alcaraz and Jannik Sinner, Sinner went up two sets (4-6 in the first, 6-7(4-7) in the second) and held three championship points on Alcaraz's serve in the fourth set, but Alcaraz managed to complete the comeback, winning the final three sets 6-4, 7-6(7-3), 7-6(10-2), to win his second French Open title in 5 hours and 29 minutes, the longest-ever final at Roland Garros. With this victory, Alcaraz now has five major men's singles titles.

== Track and field ==
In the 10,000 metres at the 1972 Summer Olympics at Munich, runner Lasse Virén fell in the twelfth lap after getting tangled with Emiel Puttemans, with Tunisia's Mohamed Gammoudi also falling after being tripped by Viren's legs. Despite losing about 20 metres, Virén caught up with, and then outpaced, the pack, breaking Ron Clarke's 7-year-old world record with a time of 27:38.40

== Yacht racing ==
In the 2013 America's Cup, Oracle Team USA (representing the Golden Gate Yacht Club), fell behind the challenger Emirates Team New Zealand (representing the Royal New Zealand Yacht Squadron) by a score of 8 races to 1. Oracle had to win the last eight consecutive races to come from behind and win the competition. This has been described as "possibly the greatest comeback in sports history".

In the 2019 Roma per tutti yacht race O' Guerriero, a Comet 41S representing the CS Yacht Club, after falling behind more than 140 miles off the leader, came back to score the overall IRC victory for the second consecutive time (after the 2018 victory) becoming the third boat in the race history to achieve a back to back win.

== See also ==
- List of teams to overcome 3–0 series deficits
- List of teams to overcome 3–1 series deficits
- List of teams to overcome 2–0 series deficits in a best-of-five series
