= Alamo Bowl =

Annual American college football postseason game

- Valero Alamo Bowl
- Stadium: Alamodome
- Location: San Antonio, Texas
- Operated: 1993–present
- Conference tie-ins: Big 12 (1996–present); Pac-12 (1993–1994; 2010–2025)
- Previous conference tie-ins: Southwest (1993–1995); Big Ten (1995–2009)
- Payout: US$8,252,740 (2019)
- Website: alamobowl.com

Sponsors
- Builders Square (1993–1998); Sylvania (1999–2001); MasterCard (2002–2005); Valero Energy Corporation (2007–present)

Former names
- Builders Square Alamo Bowl (1993–1998); Sylvania Alamo Bowl (1999–2001); Alamo Bowl Presented By MasterCard (2002); MasterCard Alamo Bowl (2003–2005); Alamo Bowl (2006)

2025 matchup
- USC vs. TCU (TCU 30–27^{OT})

The Alamo Bowl is a college football post-season bowl game featuring NCAA Division I Football Bowl Subdivision (FBS) teams, played annually since 1993 in the Alamodome in San Antonio, Texas. Traditionally, the Alamo Bowl has been played in late December, although it has been contested in early January three times. The bowl has had tie-ins with several athletic conferences, most recently the Big 12 Conference and Pac-12 Conference. Since 2007, the game has been sponsored by Valero Energy Corporation and is officially known as the Valero Alamo Bowl.

== History ==
The game was previously known as the Builders Square Alamo Bowl (1993–1998), the Sylvania Alamo Bowl (1999–2001), and the MasterCard Alamo Bowl (2002–2005). The logo of the event has evolved to reflect the changes in sponsorship. On May 24, 2007, the Alamo Bowl announced a partnership with San Antonio-based Valero Energy Corporation, and thus the bowl's full name was changed. The partnership with Valero remained place through the 2025 edition.

The game originally gave an automatic invite to a team from the now-defunct Southwest Conference (SWC). However, in 1993, only two of the eight SWC teams finished with the necessary 6 wins against Division I-A teams to become bowl-eligible, and those two teams were already committed to other bowls, so the Iowa Hawkeyes of the Big Ten were invited instead. The SWC was able to provide teams for the next two seasons (Baylor Bears in 1994 and Texas A&M Aggies in 1995) before the conference disbanded.

During the 1996 Alamo Bowl, the Iowa Hawkeyes wore plain black helmets (removing their tigerhawk logo and gold stripe) in honor of linebacker Mark Mitchell's mother, who died in a car accident while traveling to San Antonio for the game.

The 2002 Alamo Bowl played between the Colorado Buffaloes and Wisconsin Badgers was the first Alamo Bowl to go into overtime, with the unranked Badgers defeating the No. 14 ranked Buffaloes after kicking a field goal to win 31–28, completing a perfect non-conference schedule at 6-0 (the Badgers finished with a 2-6 record in the Big Ten).

The 2005 Alamo Bowl ended with one of the most controversial plays in bowl game history. During the multi-lateral play, almost the entire Nebraska Cornhuskers team and coaching staff as well as half of the Michigan Wolverines sideline came onto the field, and the Cornhuskers gave their coach a Gatorade shower before the play was blown dead. It drew parallels to 1982's "The Play", 2000's "Music City Miracle", and 2002's "Bluegrass Miracle". Nebraska won the game, 32−28, after Michigan was not able to reach the endzone.

The 2007 Alamo Bowl between the Penn State Nittany Lions and the Texas A&M Aggies was attended by 66,166, an Alamodome facility-record crowd for a sporting event, breaking the previous record set in the 2006 Alamo Bowl. The Nittany Lions won the game, 24–17.

The Alamo Bowl has sold out at least seven editions: 1995, 1999, 2001, 2004, 2006, 2007, and 2011.

On August 28, 2009, the Alamo Bowl organizers announced they had reached an agreement with the then Pac-10 Conference to replace the Big Ten in the Alamo Bowl. Under the terms of the agreement, the Pac-10's second-choice team would earn a bid to the Alamo Bowl. The agreement took effect beginning with the 2010 college football season. The Pac-10's second-choice team was previously contracted to play in the Holiday Bowl against the third choice from the Big 12 Conference. The Big 12's third-choice also moved to the Alamo Bowl, with the Holiday Bowl receiving third choice of team from the Pac-10 and the fourth choice from the Big Ten. The 2009 agreement persisted through the expansion of the Pac-10 when it became the Pac-12 Conference in 2011.

In the 2011 Alamo Bowl, the Baylor Bears and Washington Huskies combined to score 123 points, breaking the record for the most points scored in a bowl game in college football history. Baylor won the game, 67–56. The 2011 game was also the first Alamo Bowl to feature a season's Heisman Trophy winner, Baylor's Robert Griffin III.

For bowls following the 2024 and 2025 seasons, Pac-12 "legacy schools" (former Pac-12 schools who left the conference in 2024) continued to fulfill their prior conference's tie-in role. In the first year of this arrangement, the 2024 Alamo Bowl became an uncommon non-playoff bowl matchup of two teams from the same conference, featuring Big 12 members BYU and Colorado—the latter being it its first Big 12 season, having previously been a member of the Pac-12. Such an occurrence was avoided in the 2025 Alamo Bowl, as Pac-12 legacy member USC, then in the Big Ten, faced TCU of the Big 12.

== Game results ==
All rankings are taken from the AP poll prior to the game being played.

Date	Winning team		Losing team		Attnd.	Notes
December 31, 1993	California	37	Iowa	3	45,716	notes
December 31, 1994	#24 Washington State	10	Baylor	3	44,106	notes
December 28, 1995	#19 Texas A&M	22	#14 Michigan	20	64,597	notes
December 29, 1996	#21 Iowa	27	Texas Tech	0	55,677	notes
December 30, 1997	#16 Purdue	33	#24 Oklahoma State	20	55,552	notes
December 29, 1998	Purdue	37	#4 Kansas State	34	60,780	notes
December 28, 1999	#13 Penn State	24	#18 Texas A&M	0	65,380	notes
December 30, 2000	#8 Nebraska	66	#19 Northwestern	17	60,028	notes
December 29, 2001	Iowa	19	Texas Tech	16	65,232	notes
December 28, 2002	Wisconsin	31	#14 Colorado	28 (OT)	50,690	notes
December 29, 2003	#22 Nebraska	17	Michigan State	3	56,229	notes
December 29, 2004	#24 Ohio State	33	Oklahoma State	7	65,265	notes
December 28, 2005	Nebraska	32	#20 Michigan	28	62,016	notes
December 30, 2006	#18 Texas	26	Iowa	24	65,875	notes
December 29, 2007	Penn State	24	Texas A&M	17	66,166	notes
December 29, 2008	#25 Missouri	30	#22 Northwestern	23 (OT)	55,986	notes
January 2, 2010	Texas Tech	41	Michigan State	31	64,757	notes
December 29, 2010	#16 Oklahoma State	36	Arizona	10	57,593	notes
December 29, 2011	#15 Baylor	67	Washington	56	65,256	notes
December 29, 2012	#23 Texas	31	#13 Oregon State	27	65,277	notes
December 30, 2013	#10 Oregon	30	Texas	7	65,918	notes
January 2, 2015	#14 UCLA	40	#11 Kansas State	35	60,517	notes
January 2, 2016	#11 TCU	47	#15 Oregon	41 (3OT)	64,569	notes
December 29, 2016	#12 Oklahoma State	38	#10 Colorado	8	59,815	notes
December 28, 2017	#13 TCU	39	#15 Stanford	37	57,653	notes
December 28, 2018	#12 Washington State	28	#25 Iowa State	26	60,675	notes
December 31, 2019	Texas	38	#12 Utah	10	60,147	notes
December 29, 2020	#20 Texas	55	Colorado	23	10,822	notes
December 29, 2021	#14 Oklahoma	47	#15 Oregon	32	59,121	notes
December 29, 2022	#12 Washington	27	#21 Texas	20	62,730	notes
December 28, 2023	#14 Arizona	38	#12 Oklahoma	24	55,853	notes
December 28, 2024	#17 BYU	36	#20 Colorado	14	64,261	notes
December 30, 2025	TCU	30	#16 USC	27 (OT)	54,751	notes

== MVPs ==
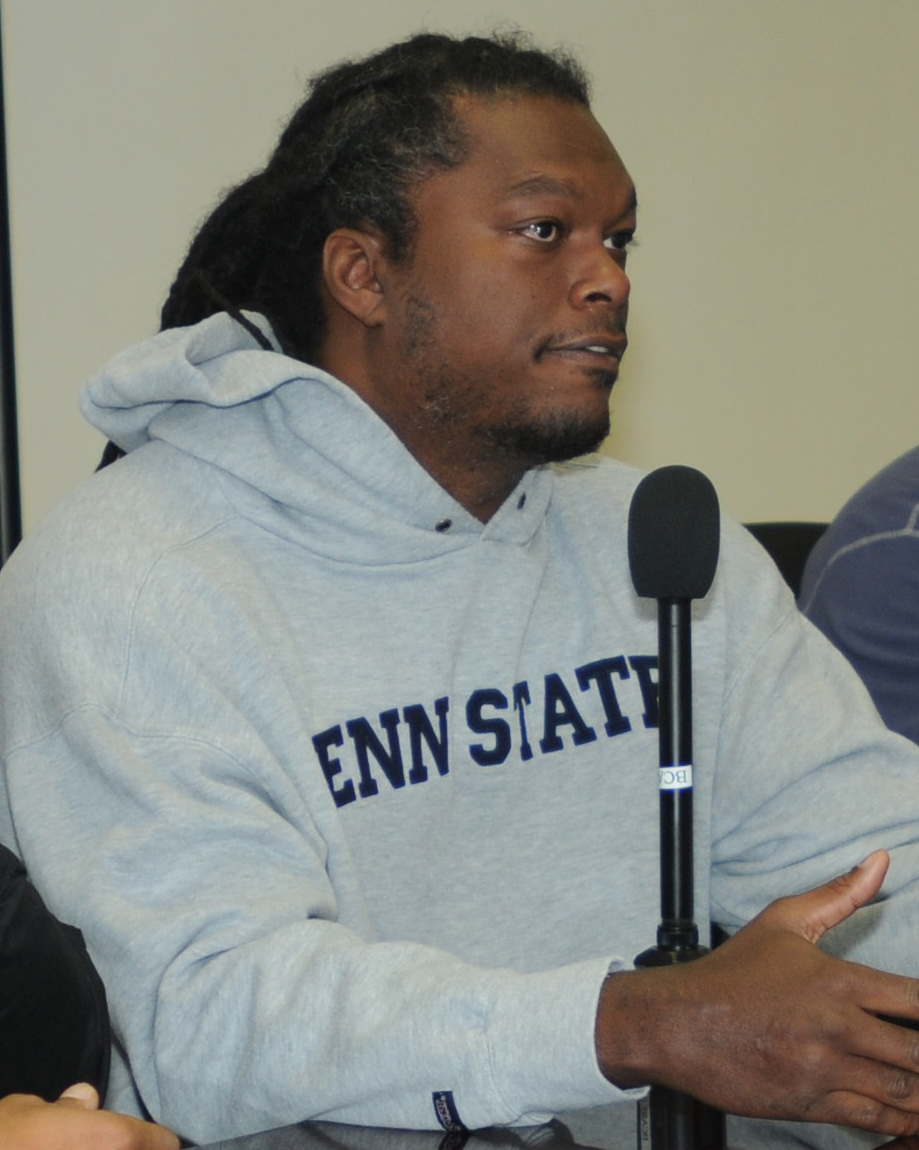
1999 defensive MVP LaVar Arrington

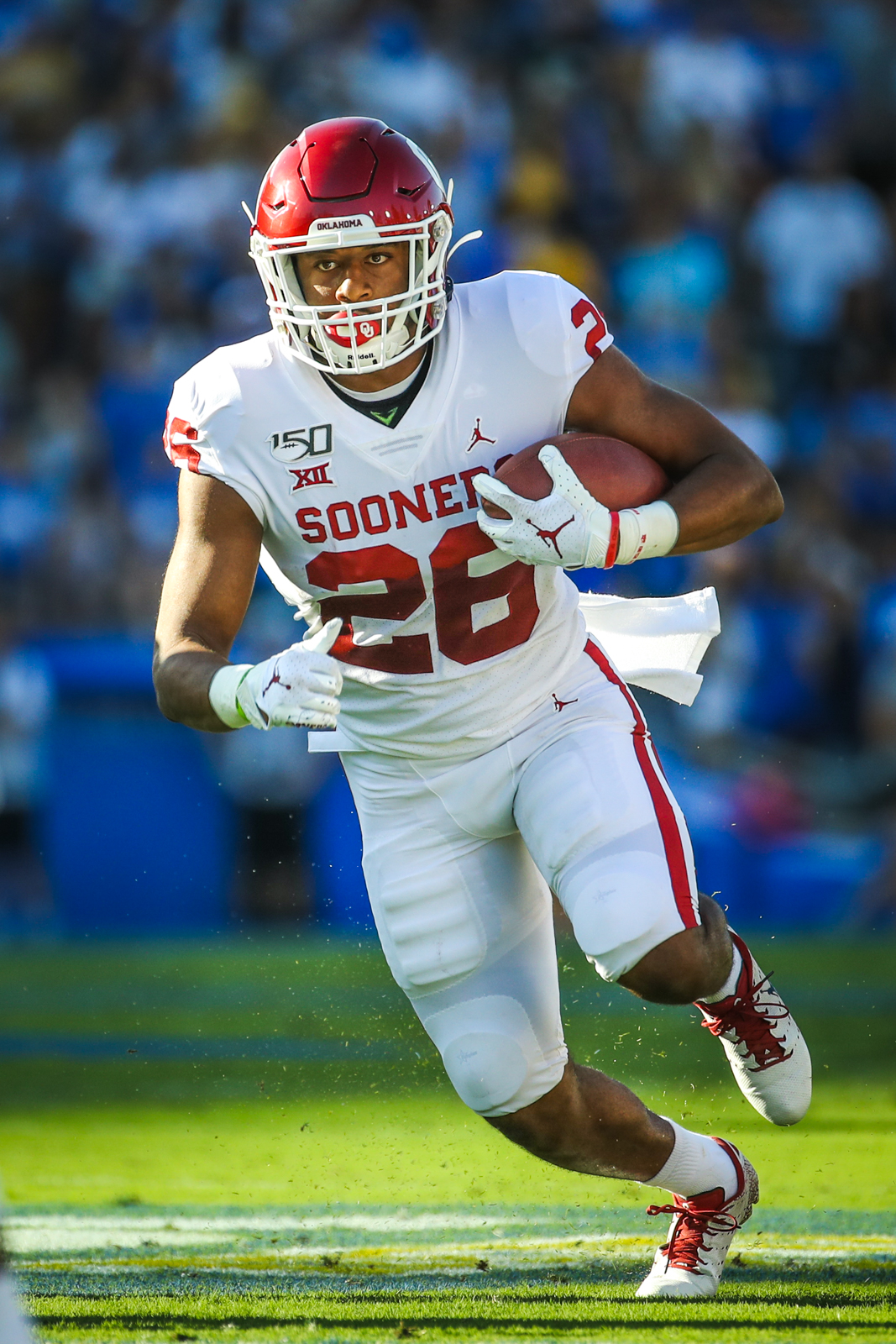
2021 offensive MVP Kennedy Brooks

Two MVPs are selected for each game; one offensive player and one defensive player.

Year	Offensive MVP			Defensive MVP		
Year	Player	Team	Pos.	Player	Team	Pos.
1993	Dave Barr	California	QB	Jerrott Willard	California	LB
1994	Chad Davis	Washington State	QB	Ron Childs	Washington State	LB
1995	Kyle Bryant	Texas A&M	K	Keith Mitchell	Texas A&M	LB
1996	Sedrick Shaw	Iowa	RB	Jared DeVries	Iowa	DL
1997	Billy Dicken	Purdue	QB	Adrian Beasley	Purdue	S
1998	Drew Brees	Purdue	QB	Rosevelt Colvin	Purdue	DE
1999	Rashard Casey	Penn State	QB	LaVar Arrington	Penn State	LB
2000	Dan Alexander	Nebraska	RB	Kyle Vanden Bosch	Nebraska	DL
2001	Aaron Greving	Iowa	RB	Derrick Pickens	Iowa	DL
2002	Brooks Bollinger	Wisconsin	QB	Jeff Mack	Wisconsin	LB
2003	Jammal Lord	Nebraska	QB	Trevor Johnson	Nebraska	DL
2004	Ted Ginn Jr.	Ohio State	WR/PR/KR	Simon Fraser	Ohio State	DE
2005	Cory Ross	Nebraska	RB	Leon Hall	Michigan	CB
2006	Colt McCoy	Texas	QB	Aaron Ross	Texas	CB
2007	Rodney Kinlaw	Penn State	RB	Sean Lee	Penn State	LB
2008	Jeremy Maclin	Missouri	WR/PR/KR	Sean Weatherspoon	Missouri	LB
Jan. 2010	Taylor Potts	Texas Tech	QB	Jamar Wall	Texas Tech	CB
Dec. 2010	Justin Blackmon	Oklahoma State	WR	Markelle Martin	Oklahoma State	S
2011	Terrance Ganaway	Baylor	RB	Elliot Coffey	Baylor	LB
2012	Marquise Goodwin	Texas	WR	Alex Okafor	Texas	DE
2013	Marcus Mariota	Oregon	QB	Avery Patterson	Oregon	SS
2015	Paul Perkins	UCLA	RB	Eric Kendricks	UCLA	LB
Jan. 2016	Bram Kohlhausen	TCU	QB	Travin Howard	TCU	LB
Dec. 2016	James Washington	Oklahoma State	WR	Vincent Taylor	Oklahoma State	DT
2017	Kenny Hill	TCU	QB	Travin Howard	TCU	LB
2018	Gardner Minshew	Washington State	QB	Peyton Pelluer	Washington State	LB
2019	Sam Ehlinger	Texas	QB	Joseph Ossai	Texas	LB
2020	Bijan Robinson	Texas	RB	DeMarvion Overshown	Texas	LB
2021	Kennedy Brooks	Oklahoma	RB	Pat Fields	Oklahoma	S
2022	Michael Penix Jr.	Washington	QB	Bralen Trice	Washington	DE
2023	Jacob Cowing	Arizona	WR	Gunner Maldonado	Arizona	S
2024	LJ Martin	BYU	RB	Isaiah Glasker	BYU	LB
2025	Ken Seals	TCU	QB	Kaleb Elarms-Orr	TCU	LB

=== Fred Jacoby Sportsmanship Award ===
The bowl's sportsmanship award is named after Fred Jacoby, who served as SWC commissioner from 1982 to 1993.

Year	Player	Team	Position
1993	Larry Blue	Iowa	DT
1994	Adrian Robinson	Baylor	DB
1995	Jarrett Irons	Michigan	LB
1996	Shane Dunn	Texas Tech	OT
1997	Kevin Williams	Oklahoma State	DB
1998	Jarrod Cooper	Kansas State	DB
1999	Jason Webster	Texas A&M	CB
2000	Zak Kustok	Northwestern	QB
2001	Anton Paige	Texas Tech	WR
2002	Zac Colvin	Colorado	QB
2003	Joe Tate	Michigan State	OG
2004	Donovan Woods	Oklahoma State	QB
2005	Steve Breaston	Michigan	WR
2006	Mike Elgin	Iowa	OL
2007	Mark Dodge	Texas A&M	LB
2008	Rasheed Ward	Northwestern	WR
Jan. 2010	Ross Weaver	Michigan State	DB
Dec. 2010	David Douglas	Arizona	WR
2011	Senio Kelemete	Washington	OG
2012	Storm Woods	Oregon State	RB
2013	Carrington Byndom	Texas	CB
2015	Tyler Lockett	Kansas State	WR
Jan. 2016	Rodney Hardrick	Oregon	LB
Dec. 2016	Sean Irwin	Colorado	TE
2017	Harrison Phillips	Stanford	DT
2018	Marcel Spears Jr.	Iowa State	LB
2019	Zack Moss	Utah	RB
2020	Carson Wells	Colorado	LB
2021	Alex Forsyth	Oregon	C
2022	Anthony Cook	Texas	DB
2023	Austin Stogner	Oklahoma	TE
2024			
2025			

== Most appearances ==
Updated through the December 2025 edition (33 games, 66 total appearances).

Teams with multiple appearances

Rank	Team	Appearances	Record		
Rank	Team	Appearances	W	L	Pct.
1	Texas	6	4	2	.667
2	Iowa	4	2	2	.500
2	Oklahoma State	4	2	2	.500
2	Colorado	4	0	4	.000
5	Nebraska	3	3	0	1.000
5	TCU	3	3	0	1.000
5	Oregon	3	1	2	.333
5	Texas A&M	3	1	2	.333
5	Texas Tech	3	1	2	.333
10	Penn State	2	2	0	1.000
10	Purdue	2	2	0	1.000
10	Washington State	2	2	0	1.000
10	Oklahoma	2	1	1	.500
10	Baylor	2	1	1	.500
10	Washington	2	1	1	.500
10	Arizona	2	1	1	.500
10	Kansas State	2	0	2	.000
10	Michigan	2	0	2	.000
10	Michigan State	2	0	2	.000
10	Northwestern	2	0	2	.000

Teams with a single appearance

Won (6): BYU, California, Missouri, Ohio State, UCLA, Wisconsin
Lost (5): Iowa State, Oregon State, Stanford, USC, Utah

Arizona State, Cincinnati, Houston, Kansas, UCF and West Virginia are the only current or former Big 12 members that have not appeared in the bowl. With the December 2025 appearance of USC, Arizona State is the only Pac-12 legacy member that has not appeared. Colorado has appeared as both a member of the Big 12 and Pac-12.

== Appearances by conference ==
Updated through the December 2025 edition (33 games, 66 total appearances).

Conference	Record				Appearances by season	
Conference	Games	W	L	Pct.	Won	Lost
Big 12	31	17	14	.548	2000, 2003, 2005, 2006, 2008, 2009*, 2010, 2011, 2012, 2015*, 2016, 2017, 2019, 2020, 2021, 2024, 2025	1996, 1997, 1998, 1999, 2001, 2002, 2004, 2007, 2013, 2014*, 2018, 2022, 2023, 2024
Big Ten	17	8	9	.471	1996, 1997, 1998, 1999, 2001, 2002, 2004, 2007	1993, 1995, 2000, 2003, 2005, 2006, 2008, 2009*, 2025
Pac-12	16	7	9	.438	1993, 1994, 2013, 2014*, 2018, 2022, 2023	2010, 2011, 2012, 2015*, 2016, 2017, 2019, 2020, 2021
SWC	2	1	1	.500	1995	1994

- Games marked with an asterisk (*) were played in January of the following calendar year.
- The record of the Pac-12 includes appearances when the conference was known as the Pac-10 (before 2011).
- The Southwest Conference (SWC) dissolved after the 1995 season.
- The December 2024 game featured two teams from the Big 12

== Game records ==
Team	Record, Team vs. Opponent	Year
Most points scored (winning team)	67, Baylor vs. Washington	2011
Most points scored (losing team)	56, Washington vs Baylor	2011
Most points scored (both teams)	123, Baylor vs. Washington	2011
Fewest points allowed	0, shared by: Iowa vs. Texas Tech; Penn State vs. Texas A&M	1996; 1999
Largest margin of victory	49, Nebraska (66) vs. Northwestern (17)	2000
Total yards	777, Baylor vs. Washington	2011
Rushing yards	482, Baylor vs. Washington	2011
Passing yards	460, Texas Tech vs. Michigan State	Jan. 2010
First downs	33, Baylor vs. Washington	2011
Fewest yards allowed	90, California vs. Iowa	1993
Fewest rushing yards allowed	20, California vs. Iowa	1993
Fewest passing yards allowed	56, Oregon vs. Texas	2013
Individual	Record, Player, Team	Year
All-purpose yards	249, Tyler Lockett (Kansas State)	2015
Touchdowns (overall)	7, Keith Price (Washington)	2011
Rushing yards	240, Dan Alexander (Nebraska)	2000
Rushing touchdowns	5, Terrance Ganaway (Baylor)	2011
Passing yards	438, Keith Price (Washington)	2011
Passing touchdowns	4, shared by : Keith Price (Washington); Casey Thompson (Texas)	2011; 2020
Receiving yards	198, Jermaine Kearse (Washington)	2011
Receptions	13, Tyler Lockett (Kansas State)	2014
Receiving touchdowns	3, J. J. Arcega-Whiteside (Stanford)	2017
Tackles	17, Sean Weatherspoon (Missouri)	2008
Sacks	4.5, Alex Okafor (Texas)	2012
Interceptions	2, most recently: Leon Hall (Michigan)	2005
Long Plays	Record, Team	Year
Touchdown run	89 yds., Terrance Ganaway (Baylor)	2011
Touchdown pass	93 yds., Jalen Reagor (TCU)	2017
Kickoff return	69 yds., Steve Breaston (Michigan)	2005
Punt return	76 yds., Desmon White (TCU)	2017
Interception return	91 yds., Don Strickland (Colorado)	2002
Fumble return	87 yds., Gunner Maldonado (Arizona)	2023
Punt	67 yds., Justin Brantly (Texas A&M)	2007
Field goal	53 yds., Cameron Dicker (Texas)	2020
Miscellaneous	Record, Teams	Year
Bowl Attendance	66,166, Penn State vs. Texas A&M	2007

== Media coverage ==
The bowl has been televised on ESPN since its inception. It has produced eight of the top 20 most-watched bowl games in ESPN history. In 2006, the Alamo Bowl featured the Texas Longhorns and the Iowa Hawkeyes in a game that earned a 6.0 rating, making it the most-watched college football game in ESPN history as more than 8.83 million viewers saw the telecast.
