= Required run rate =

Cricket statistic

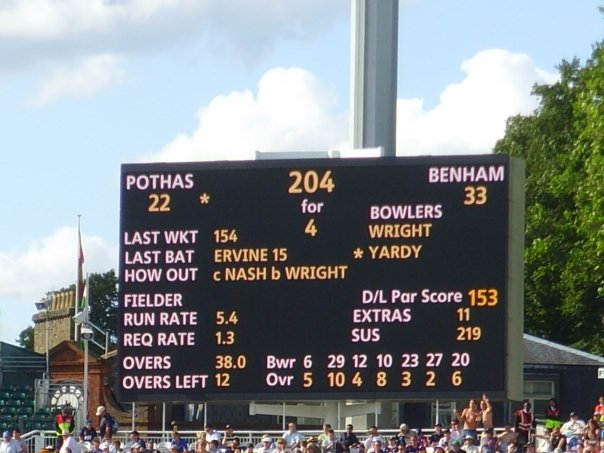
Scoreboard showing required run rate (1.3).

In cricket, the required run rate (RRR), or asking rate, is the run rate (the average number of runs per over) the batting side must achieve in order to win the present match. Expressed differently, it is the total number of runs required of the batting team to win the match, divided by the total number of overs remaining in the match.

The required run rate is typically a statistic that is tracked in real-time during a limited-overs match, including Twenty20 and One Day International matches. It is usually shown in the second innings, when the side batting in that innings is chasing the other's run total from the first innings. Higher required run rates are more difficult to achieve, since batsmen are forced to score more runs within a limited number of deliveries from the bowling side. During the closing overs a chase is often quoted instead as the number of runs still needed from the deliveries remaining, so that a requirement such as 65 from 36 balls is read off directly as the innings progresses. The required run rate can also be used in Test cricket, usually in the fourth innings of a match, when the batting side is chasing the opposing team's total with a limited number of possible overs left to play, though use of the term is less common in this form of the game.

In recent times, required run rates have often tended to be particularly high as batting sides have grown increasingly accustomed to chasing high run totals, especially in Twenty20 cricket.

In matches with tiebreakers (such as a Super Over), a chasing team can win the game while scoring slightly below the required run rate, so long as they tie with the other team.

== See also ==
- Cricket terminology
- Run rate
- Net run rate
- Economy rate (cricket)
