= Bill Callahan (American football coach) =

American football coach (born 1956)

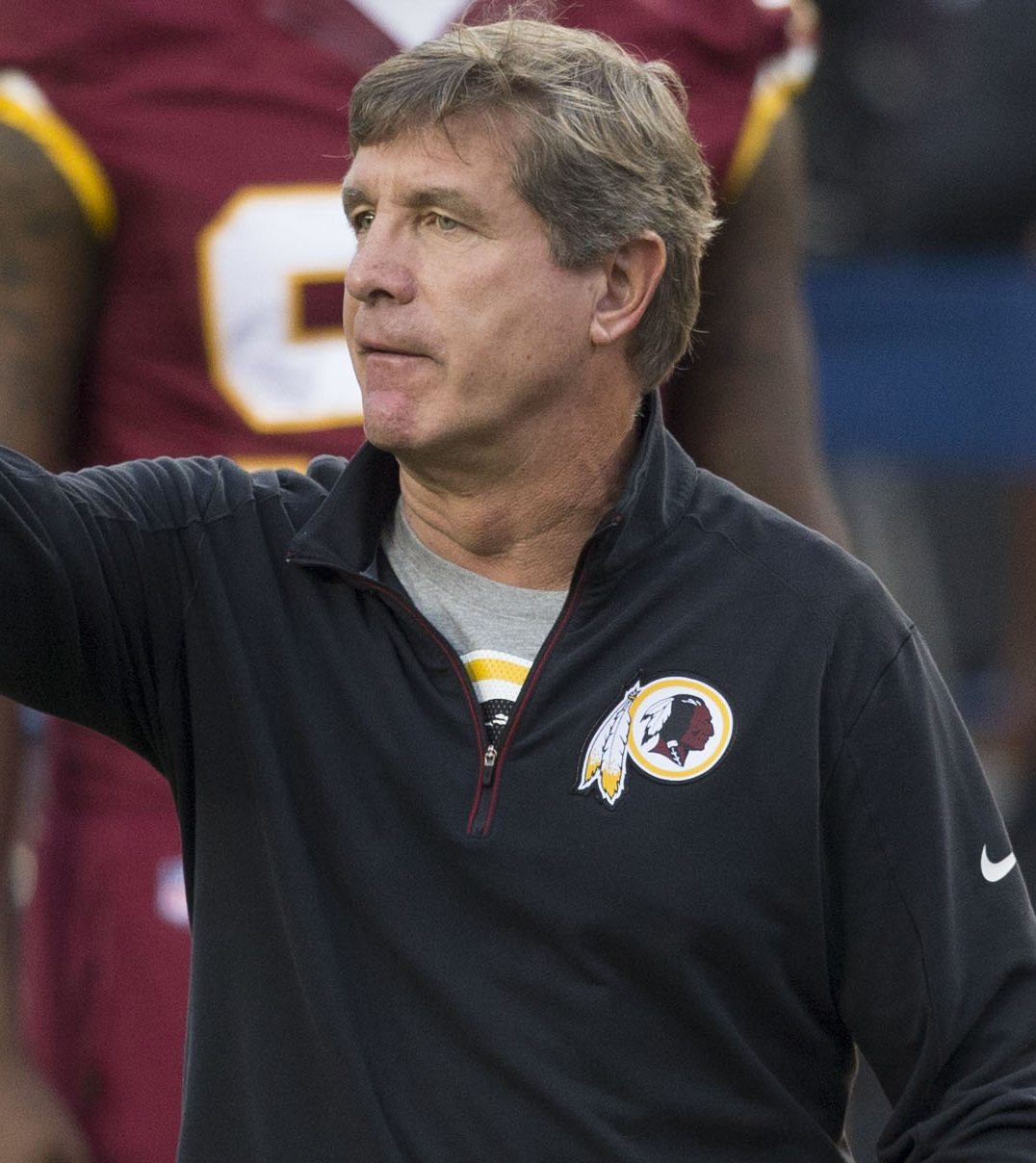
- Callahan with the Washington Redskins in 2015

Atlanta Falcons
- Title: Offensive line coach

Personal information
- Born: July 31, 1956 (age 70); Chicago, Illinois, U.S.

Career information
- Position: Quarterback
- College: Benedictine (IL) (1974–1977)

Career history
- Oak Lawn Community High School (1978) Assistant coach; De La Salle Institute (1979) Assistant coach; Illinois (1980–1986); Graduate assistant (1980–1981); Special teams & tight ends coach (1982–1983); Offensive line coach (1984–1985); Quarterbacks coach (1986); Northern Arizona (1987–1988) Offensive line coach; Southern Illinois (1989) Offensive coordinator; Wisconsin (1990–1994) Offensive line coach; Philadelphia Eagles (1995–1997) Offensive line coach; Oakland Raiders (1998–2003); Offensive coordinator & tight ends coach (1998); Offensive coordinator & offensive line coach (1999–2001); Head coach (2002–2003); Nebraska (2004–2007) Head coach; New York Jets (2008–2011) Assistant head coach & offensive line coach; Dallas Cowboys (2012–2014) Offensive coordinator & offensive line coach; Washington Redskins (2015–2019); Offensive line coach (2015–2016); Assistant head coach & offensive line coach (2017–2019); Interim head coach (2019); Cleveland Browns (2020–2023) Offensive line coach; Tennessee Titans (2024–2025) Offensive line coach; Atlanta Falcons (2026–present) Offensive line coach

Head coaching record
- Regular season: NFL: 18–25 (.419); NCAA: 27–22 (.551)
- Postseason: NFL: 2–1 (.667); Bowl games: 1–1 (.500)
- Career: NFL: 20–26 (.435); NCAA: 28–23 (.549)
- Coaching profile at Pro Football Reference

William E. Callahan (born July 31, 1956) is an American football coach who is the offensive line coach for the Atlanta Falcons of the National Football League (NFL). Callahan was the head coach of the Oakland Raiders in 2002 and 2003, leading them to Super Bowl XXXVII, where the Raiders lost to the Tampa Bay Buccaneers. He was also the head coach for the Nebraska Cornhuskers from 2004 to 2007 and interim head coach for the Washington Redskins in 2019. Callahan is considered to be one of the best offensive line coaches in the NFL. His son, Brian, was the head coach of the Titans.

== College career ==
Callahan was a four-year starter at quarterback at Illinois Benedictine College in Lisle, Illinois, where he was an NAIA honorable mention All-American in his final two seasons.

== Early coaching career ==
The Chicago native began his coaching career in 1978 with back-to-back year-long stints as an assistant coach at Oak Lawn Community High School and De La Salle Institute. Callahan started his college coaching career shortly after in 1980 as a graduate assistant at the University of Illinois before being promoted to full-time assistant in 1981, coaching tight ends, offensive line, quarterbacks and special teams through 1986.

Callahan served as the offensive line coach at Northern Arizona University from 1987 to 1988 and one year as offensive coordinator of Southern Illinois in 1989. From 1990 to 1994, Callahan was offensive line coach at the University of Wisconsin–Madison. He has been praised by former Wisconsin coach Barry Alvarez as being one of the primary reasons why the Badgers were able to turn their program around and eventually win three Rose Bowls in the 1990s. Alvarez cited Callahan specifically for his strong recruiting abilities.

At Southern Illinois in 1989, Callahan led an offense that ran for 1,245 yards and threw for 2,569 yards with 19 touchdowns. As of 2011, the 238 completions and 432 pass attempts were second most in school history in both categories.

At Wisconsin after a 1–10 season in 1990, Callahan helped pave the way for Terrell Fletcher to run for 446 yards in 1991. In 1992, that number jumped to 492 and Brent Moss ran for 739 yards and 9 touchdowns. By 1993, Wisconsin's offensive line paved the way for Moss rushing for 1,637 yards and 16 touchdowns. Fletcher also ran for 996 yards and nine touchdowns and quarterback Darrell Bevell was able to throw for 19 touchdowns. In 1994, Bevell would throw 17 touchdowns while Fletcher would run for 1,476 yards and 12 touchdowns and Moss ran for 833 yards and eight touchdowns. Some of the offensive linemen that Callahan coached during this period include Joe Panos, Joe Rudolph, Steve Stark, Mike Verstagen, and Cory Raymer.

== Coaching career ==
=== Philadelphia Eagles ===
Callahan started his NFL career as the offensive line coach for the Philadelphia Eagles from 1995 to 1997.

=== Oakland Raiders ===
Callahan then spent four seasons as the Oakland Raiders' offensive coordinator before being named the franchise's 13th head coach prior to the 2002 season.

In his first season as a head coach, Callahan led the Raiders to a third consecutive AFC West title and the franchise's first Super Bowl since returning to Oakland, making him just the fourth rookie head coach in NFL history to do so. The Raiders suffered a lopsided defeat in Super Bowl XXXVII losing 48–21 to the Tampa Bay Buccaneers coached by his former boss Jon Gruden. It did not help that the Raiders were without starting center Barret Robbins, the leader of their offensive line. Robbins went into a manic episode after not taking his medication, and spent most of the day before the game in Tijuana believing that the Raiders had already won. When he finally resurfaced, Robbins was so incoherent that Callahan had no choice but to leave him off the roster.

Callahan is the third Raiders head coach to win an AFC West title and lead his team into the conference championship game in his first full season. Only Art Shell (1990) and John Madden (1969) had accomplished this feat.

Under Callahan's guidance, the Raiders led the NFL in passing for the first time in team history and led the league in total offense for just the second time in team history.

During his tenure as not only head coach but also offensive coordinator for the Raiders, the Raiders offense led the league in rushing in 2000 and led the league in passing in 2002. In 2002, the Raiders became the first team to win games in the same season while rushing at least 60 times (against the Kansas City Chiefs in a 24–0 shutout victory) and passing at least 60 times (against the Pittsburgh Steelers in a 30–17 win). The Raiders offense also set many franchise records during this period, including fewest sacks allowed (28) in 2000, a mark that was broken the following year (27).

Despite the success of the 2002 team, the Raiders had a losing record in 2003. After they got off to a 2–5 start, many of the players, in particular Charles Woodson, publicly criticized Callahan, even suggesting that Callahan was deliberately trying to "sabotage the season". According to Woodson, the Raiders locker room was almost in a state of mutiny against Callahan, a claim corroborated by veteran receiver Tim Brown and others. Callahan, his supporters claim, had recognized that the team was aging and needed younger talent. To get it, he would have to cut existing salaries, an assertion that did not sit well with many of the team's veterans. It did not help that quarterback Rich Gannon was sidelined with injuries for much of the season. On November 30, after a 22–8 loss to the Denver Broncos, Callahan said the Raiders must have been "the dumbest team in America in terms of playing the game." After a lackluster 4–12 season, Callahan was fired by Raiders owner Al Davis. Although the Raiders had gone all the way to the Super Bowl a year earlier, Davis was not known for being patient with his coaches. Callahan was the last Raiders head coach to post a winning season until Jack Del Rio in 2016.

==== Controversy surrounding Super Bowl XXXVII ====
In January 2013, Callahan was publicly accused of sabotaging Super Bowl XXXVII by several former players. According to comments by Tim Brown and others, the Raiders struggled on offense during the Super Bowl because of Callahan changing the game plan from a heavy run attack to a heavy passing one on the Friday before the game. Although some claim this was due to the Barret Robbins incident, Brown offered no proof for the sabotage claim, but said: "this is the problem we have, because of Callahan's relationship with Gruden, because of his disdain for the Raider organization; that's what makes people get to that conclusion." Rich Gannon defended Callahan, but did suggest that Oakland may have been disadvantaged by Callahan's failure to change the terminology for play calls at the line of scrimmage. According to Gannon, the same play names had been used during Gruden's tenure as Raiders head coach, and Gruden had taught his Buccaneers defensive players these play names.

Jerry Rice, an NFL Hall of Famer who was a wide receiver for the Raiders at that time, was quoted as saying, "I was very surprised that he waited till the last second and I think a lot of the players they were surprised also so in a way maybe because he didn't like the Raiders he decided 'Hey look maybe we should sabotage just a little bit and let Jon Gruden go out and win this one.'"

Callahan has denied the allegations, stating that, "While I fully understand a competitive professional football player's disappointment when a game's outcome doesn't go his team's way, I am shocked, saddened and outraged by Tim Brown's allegations and Jerry Rice's support of those allegations made through various media outlets over the last 24 hours. To leave no doubt, I categorically and unequivocally deny the sum and substance of their allegations." Callahan further referred to the claim as "ludicrous and defamatory."

Brown backtracked from his comments a day later, denying having said that Callahan sabotaged the game.

=== Nebraska Cornhuskers ===
Soon after being fired by the Raiders, Callahan was hired at the University of Nebraska–Lincoln. This would mark the first time in over four decades (since the hiring of Bob Devaney in 1962) that the Cornhuskers would be led by a head coach with no direct ties to the university either as a player or an assistant coach.

In his first season at Nebraska (2004), Callahan finished 5–6, giving the Cornhuskers their first losing season in more than 40 years. He had introduced the West Coast offense to a program that had traditionally relied on a strong option running attack.

The Cornhuskers finished 8–4 during his second season and won the 2005 Alamo Bowl by defeating No. 20 Michigan, 32–28. The 7–4 Wolverines were the highest-ranked opponent that Nebraska had defeated since a 20–10 win over No. 2 Oklahoma in October 2001. The Wolverines also were the highest-ranked opponent defeated by Nebraska away from home since a 66–17 win over Northwestern in the 2000 Alamo Bowl.

The 2006 team finished 9–5 and won the Big 12 North for the first time since 1999. The win over then No. 24-ranked Texas A&M marked Nebraska's first ever road win over a ranked Big 12 South team.

Many expected that the 2007 season would be a breakthrough year for Nebraska. However, the team fell well short of expectations. Nebraska was beaten by USC 49–31 in a nationally televised September 15 game, being outrushed by a 313 to 31 margin but outgaining USC in the passing game 389 to 144. A 41–6 thumping by Missouri started a five-game losing streak—the Cornhuskers' first since 1958. On October 15, 2007, Steve Pederson, the athletic director who had hired Callahan, was fired. Pederson was replaced on an interim basis by Nebraska's legendary former head coach, Tom Osborne.

On November 3, the Cornhuskers suffered a 76–39 pounding at the hands of Kansas. It was the most points a Cornhuskers team had ever surrendered at the time. The Cornhuskers followed this performance a week later with a win, scoring 73 points against Kansas State.

On November 24, 2007, the day after a 65–51 loss to rival Colorado, Callahan arrived at the team's practice facility at 6:30 a.m. He met briefly with Osborne and was fired. While leaving the complex, he waved to reporters gathered outside. Osborne announced during a press conference held at the school that despite Callahan's ouster, he would still earn $3.1 million as part of his buyout.

While Nebraska's defense struggled during Callahan's tenure, numerous offensive school records were set (some of which could be attributed to the dramatic change in offensive philosophy) and quarterback Zac Taylor was named Big 12 Offensive Player of the Year for 2006. Callahan's tenure as Nebraska's head coach was primarily defined by an emphasis on recruiting (something many Nebraska fans felt was lacking during the previous coach's tenure). For example, with the assistance of his recruiting coordinator John Blake, Nebraska recruited defensive tackle Ndamukong Suh (2009 AP Player of the Year, Nagurski Trophy winner, Heisman Trophy finalist, etc.) although Suh later stated that he would "probably be at Oregon State right now" had Callahan not been fired. Callahan's 2005 recruiting class was rated as top-five by Rivals and ESPN analyst Tom Lemming said they were "No. 1, without a doubt.".

Callahan had a 27–22 record at Nebraska. He led the Cornhuskers to two losing seasons in four years. Callahan also finished ranked in a major poll only once in four years after the Huskers had only finished unranked once since 1962. Streaks such as 35 straight years in a bowl game and decades of consecutive wins against Kansas were lost in his four-year tenure. Callahan was 3–10 against teams ranked in the Top 25, 27–2 in games in which he led at halftime, 0–17 in games in which he trailed at halftime, 25–21 against Division I opponents, 15–18 against the Big 12, and coached the program its only two losing seasons (out of 4 seasons at Nebraska) in 46 years. Sports Illustrated named Callahan as the worst coaching hire of the decade in college football. Exacerbating Cornhusker fans' consternation with Callahan's tenure at the university was his insistence that he had "done an excellent job in every area."

=== New York Jets ===
On January 18, 2008, Callahan was hired as assistant head coach of the New York Jets. On January 2, 2009, he interviewed for the position of head coach of the Jets.

In 2008, three of the offensive linemen (with Bill Callahan as their position coach) from the Jets were named to the Pro Bowl: Nick Mangold, Alan Faneca, and D'Brickashaw Ferguson. All three repeated in 2009. Under Callahan's direction of the running game, the Jets broke the franchise record in 2009, gaining 2,756 yards on the ground through 16 regular season games. They led the National Football League in rushing and averaged 4.5 yards per attempt.

For the 2009 season, Peter King named Callahan the assistant coach of the year.

=== Dallas Cowboys ===
The Dallas Cowboys hired Callahan as their offensive line coach during the 2012 offseason. On June 4, 2013, Cowboys owner Jerry Jones announced that Callahan would call plays on offense during the upcoming season, allowing head coach Jason Garrett to focus on game-management. After being the offensive coordinator for the Cowboys during the 2013 season, Callahan was stripped of his play calling duties.

During the 2014 offseason, the Cleveland Browns and Baltimore Ravens both asked the Cowboys for permission to interview Callahan for their open offensive coordinator positions, but the Cowboys declined. The Cowboys let Callahan's contract as offensive line coach expire after the 2014 season, allowing him to seek other opportunities. At the time, Callahan was considered among the best offensive line coaches in the NFL, and some considered him to be the leading reason behind the success of the Cowboys' offensive line, which had three linemen (Tyron Smith, Zack Martin, and Travis Frederick) named to the 2014 All-Pro Team.

=== Washington Redskins ===
On January 15, 2015, the Washington Redskins hired Callahan as their offensive line coach.

On March 15, 2017, the Redskins promoted Callahan to assistant head coach in addition to his offensive line duties.

On October 7, 2019, following a 0–5 start to the season, the Redskins fired head coach Jay Gruden and named Callahan the interim head coach for the rest of the season. Callahan went 3–8 in his stint as interim coach. The Redskins hired Ron Rivera shortly after the conclusion of the season.

=== Cleveland Browns ===
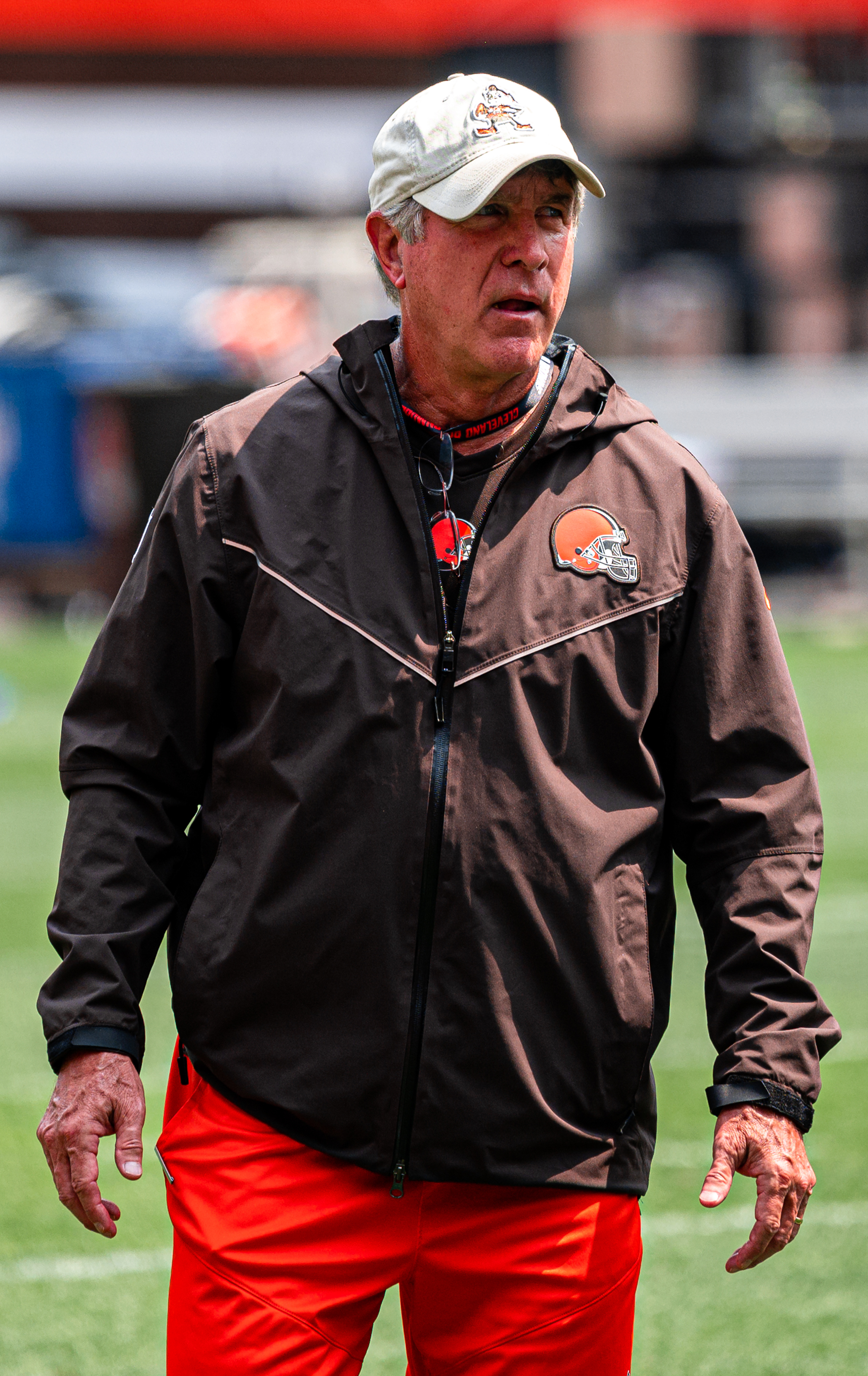
Callahan in 2021

On January 31, 2020, Callahan was hired by the Cleveland Browns as their offensive line coach under new head coach Kevin Stefanski. He missed the Wild Card Round against the Pittsburgh Steelers due to COVID-19 protocols, but returned for the Divisional Round against the Kansas City Chiefs.

On January 20, 2023, Callahan nixed an offensive coordinator interview that he had with the New York Jets and agreed to a contract extension with the Browns.

=== Tennessee Titans ===
On February 13, 2024, Callahan was hired by the Tennessee Titans as their offensive line coach to work under his son, Brian, who was hired as the team's new head coach a few weeks prior.

After the Titans fired his son on October 13, 2025, Callahan left the team the following day.

=== Atlanta Falcons ===
On January 18, 2026, Callahan was hired by the Atlanta Falcons to be their new offensive line coach, reuniting him with new head coach Kevin Stefanski.

== Head coaching record ==
=== NFL ===
Team	Year	Regular season					Postseason			
Team	Year	Won	Lost	Ties	Win %	Finish	Won	Lost	Win %	Result
OAK	2002	11	5	0	.688	1st in AFC West	2	1	.667	Lost to Tampa Bay Buccaneers in Super Bowl XXXVII
OAK	2003	4	12	0	.250	3rd in AFC West	—	—	—	—
OAK Total		15	17	0	.469		2	1	.667	
WAS*	2019	3	8	0	.273	4th in NFC East	—	—	—	—
WAS Total		3	8	0	.273		0	0	.000	
Total		18	25	0	.419		2	1	.667	

* – Interim head coach

=== College ===
Year	Team	Overall	Conference	Standing	Bowl/playoffs	Coaches^{#}	AP^{°}
Nebraska Cornhuskers (Big 12 Conference) (2004–2007)
2004	Nebraska	5–6	3–5	3rd (North)			
2005	Nebraska	8–4	4–4	T–2nd (North)	W Alamo	24	24
2006	Nebraska	9–5	6–2	1st (North)	L Cotton		
2007	Nebraska	5–7	2–6	T–5th (North)			
Nebraska Total:		27–22	15–17				
Total:		27–22					
National championship Conference title Conference division title or championship game berth
^{#}Rankings from final Coaches Poll.; ^{°}Rankings from final AP Poll.
