= 2005 Alamo Bowl =

College football game

2005 MasterCard Alamo Bowl
Michigan Wolverines	Nebraska Cornhuskers
(7–4)	(7–4)
Big Ten	Big 12
28	32
Head coach: Lloyd Carr	Head coach: Bill Callahan
AP / Coaches / BCS; 20 / 21 / 20
	1	2	3	4	Total
Michigan	7	7	7	7	28
Nebraska	7	7	3	15	32
- Date: December 28, 2005
- Season: 2005
- Stadium: Alamodome
- Location: San Antonio, Texas
- MVP: Cory Ross (Nebraska RB); Leon Hall (Michigan CB)
- Referee: Jim Jackson (Sun Belt)
- Attendance: 63,016

United States TV coverage
- Network: ESPN
- Announcers: Mike Tirico, Kirk Herbstreit, Erin Andrews

The 2005 Alamo Bowl was a college football bowl game held on December 28, 2005 at the Alamodome in San Antonio, Texas. It was the 13th Alamo Bowl. The Nebraska Cornhuskers, second-place finishers in the Big 12 Conference's North Division, defeated the Michigan Wolverines, third-placed finishers in the Big Ten Conference. This matchup was notable in that it featured the two schools that shared the 1997 national championship. At the time, Michigan and Nebraska were two of only five schools in NCAA Division I history with 800 or more victories.

== Game summary ==
Nebraska started the scoring with a 52-yard touchdown pass from Zac Taylor to wide receiver Terrence Nunn. Michigan tied it at 7–7 on a 13-yard pass from Chad Henne to tight end Tyler Ecker. In the second quarter, Henne hooked up with Mike Massey for a 16-yard touchdown pass, giving Michigan a 14–7 lead. Taylor found wide receiver Nate Swift for a 14-yard touchdown pass late in the second quarter, knotting the score at 14–14 going into the half. In the third quarter, kicker Jordan Congdon gave Nebraska a 17–14 lead with a 20-yard field goal. Henne later found wide receiver Mario Manningham for a 21-yard touchdown and Michigan reclaimed the lead, 21–17.

Henne led off the scoring in the fourth quarter with a rushing touchdown, extending Michigan's lead to 28–17. Running back Cory Ross then scored on a 31-yard touchdown scamper for Nebraska. Taylor found Todd Peterson for the ensuing two-point conversion, narrowing Michigan's lead to 28–25. With 4:29 left in the game, Taylor and Nunn hooked up again for a 13-yard go-ahead touchdown to give Nebraska a 32–28 lead.

=== Final play ===
Michigan's last-ditch attempt to win the game came on a seven-lateral scramble somewhat reminiscent of the famous Cal-Stanford band play. Henne completed a pass across the middle of the field to Jason Avant, who caught the ball at midfield and immediately lateraled to Steve Breaston. Breaston threw the ball backwards to Mike Hart, who lateraled back to Avant. Avant then threw the ball across the entire width of the field, where Manningham caught it as he was being tackled. Manningham attempted another backward pass, which hit the ground and bounced two or three times off the hands of two Nebraska defenders, before being picked up by Michigan Center Mark Bihl, who lateraled to Tyler Ecker. Because the ball had hit the ground, several members of both teams and the media, believing the play was dead, rushed onto the field while Ecker ran downfield. Controversially, several of the officials began to leave the field, unaware that the play was still occurring. Nebraska players also gave their coach the Gatorade dunk before the play was over, reminiscent of the Bluegrass Miracle. Ecker dodged several players and coaches and returned the ball approximately 60 yards to the Nebraska 16-yard line. At that point, Cornhusker cornerback Zackary Bowman knocked him out of bounds after time had expired ending the game.

=== Scoring summary ===
==== First quarter ====
- Nebraska - Terrence Nunn, 52-yard pass from Zac Taylor (Jordan Condon kick)
- Michigan - Tyler Ecker, 13-yard pass from Chad Henne (Garrett Rivas kick)

==== Second quarter ====
- Michigan - Mike Massey, 16-yard pass from Chad Henne (Garrett Rivas kick)
- Nebraska - Nate Swift, 14-yard pass from Zac Taylor (Jordan Condon kick)

==== Third quarter ====
- Nebraska - Jordan Condon, 20-yard field goal
- Michigan - Mario Manningham, 21-yard pass from Chad Henne (Garrett Rivas kick)

==== Fourth quarter ====
- Michigan - Chad Henne, 7-yard run (Garrett Rivas kick)
- Nebraska - Cory Ross, 31-yard run (Todd Peterson pass from Zac Taylor)
- Nebraska - Terrence Nunn, 13-yard pass from Zac Taylor (Jordan Condon kick)
