= Bram Kohlhausen =

American football player (born 1992)

No. 6
- Position: Quarterback

Personal information
- Born: August 7, 1992 (age 34); Houston, Texas, U.S.
- Listed height: 6 ft 2 in (1.88 m)
- Listed weight: 203 lb (92 kg)

Career information
- High school: Lamar (Houston, Texas)
- College: Houston (2011–2012); L.A. Harbor College (2013); TCU (2014–2015)

Awards and highlights
- Alamo Bowl Offensive MVP (2016)

Bram Kohlhausen (born August 7, 1992) is an American former college football quarterback who primarily played for the TCU Horned Frogs. He is best known for leading the Horned Frogs to an Alamo Bowl victory over Oregon after trailing 31–0.

== College career ==
As a walk-on senior having never started a game for TCU before, he helped TCU comeback from the largest deficit in NCAA bowl game history in the 2016 Alamo Bowl. Down 31–0 at halftime, Kohlhausen led the Frogs to a victory in triple-overtime against the Oregon Ducks.

In his first and only NCAA D1 start, he was the offensive MVP of the Alamo Bowl.

== Personal life ==
=== Helicopter accident ===
On May 8, 2023, former TCU head football coach Gary Patterson revealed that Kohlhausen was in a San Antonio intensive care unit after sustaining “serious injuries” after falling from a helicopter while on a hunting trip near San Antonio. Friends believe that Kohlhausen fell anywhere between 70 and 80 feet and that the injuries were potentially life-threatening and debilitating.

On July 3, 2023, while noting that Kohlhausen was improving, it was revealed that he had both of his feet amputated due to landing on both of his feet when he fell from the helicopter. He also suffered a variety of other major injuries such as broken bones. He also revealed that he suffered the injury when he was participating in a hunting trip on private property while hunting for wild hogs from the helicopter.

As of 2025, Kohlhausen has regained the ability to walk with the aid of prosthetic legs.
