= Chad Davis (American football) =

American football player (born 1973)

Profile
- Position: Quarterback

Personal information
- Born: May 22, 1973 (age 53)
- Listed height: 6 ft 2 in (1.88 m)
- Listed weight: 200 lb (91 kg)

Career information
- High school: Mira Mesa (San Diego, California)
- College: Oklahoma (1992); Washington State (1994–1995)
- NFL draft: 1996: undrafted

Career history
- Memphis Pharaohs/Portland Forest Dragons (1996–1997)

Career AFL statistics
- Comp. / Att.: 158 / 296
- Passing yards: 1,751
- TD–INT: 22–9
- QB rating: 77.13
- Rushing TDs: 2
- Stats at ArenaFan.com

Chad Davis (born May 22, 1973) is an American former football quarterback. He played college football at Washington State University, and professionally with the Memphis Pharaohs/Portland Forest Dragons of the Arena Football League (AFL).

== Early life ==
Chad Davis was born on May 22, 1973. He attended Mira Mesa Senior High School in San Diego, California. He earned Parade All-American honors as a senior in 1991. He passed for over 9,000 yards in high school.

== College career ==
Davis redshirted for the Oklahoma Sooners of the University of Oklahoma in 1992. In August 1993, it was reported that he was transferring to play for the Washington State Cougars of Washington State University but that he would have to sit out his first season due to NCAA transfer rules. He completed 170 of 304 passes (55.9%) for 2,013 yards, ten touchdowns and six interceptions while also scoring two rushing touchdowns. Davis was named the offensive MVP of the 1994 Alamo Bowl after completing 27 of 35 passes for 286 yards in the 10–3 victory over the Baylor Bears. He started the first nine games of the 1995 season but was benched for Ryan Leaf for the final two games as Washington finished 3–8. Overall in 1995, Davis recorded 174 completions on 301 passing attempts (57.8%) for 1,868 yards, 12 touchdowns, and eight interceptions. He skipped his senior year to enter the 1996 NFL draft.

== Professional career ==
After going undrafted, Davis played in five games for the Memphis Pharaohs of the Arena Football League in 1996, completing 46 of 89 passes (51.7%) for 501 yards, seven touchdowns, and five interceptions while also rushing nine times for 20 yards and one touchdown. The Pharaohs became the Portland Forest Dragons in 1997. Davis appeared in ten games during the 1997 season, totaling 112 completions on 207 passing attempts (54.1%) for 1,250 yards, 15 touchdowns, and four interceptions, and 20 carries for 60 yards and one touchdown.
