= Net run rate =

Tie-breaking formula in limited overs Cricket

Net run rate (NRR) is a statistical method used in analysing teamwork and/or performance in cricket. It is the most commonly used method of ranking teams with equal points in limited overs league competitions, similar to goal difference in association football.

The NRR in a single game is the average runs per over that team scores, minus the average runs per over that is scored against them. The NRR in a tournament is the average runs per over that a team scores across the whole tournament, minus the average runs per over that is scored against them across the whole tournament. This is the same as the weighted average of the run rates scored in each match (weighted by the lengths of the innings batted compared to the other innings batted), minus the weighted average of the run rates conceded in each match (weighted by the lengths of the innings bowled compared to the other innings bowled). This is not usually the same as the total or average of the NRRs from the individual matches in the tournament.

A positive NRR means a team is scoring faster than its opposition overall, while a negative NRR means a team is scoring slower than the teams it has come up against. It is therefore desirable for the NRR to be as high as possible.

NRR has been criticised as hard to understand. Also, while it measures how quickly teams score and concede runs, this is not at all the same as how big the teams' margins of victory or defeat are (as it ignores wickets lost), and so ranking sides by NRR does not rank them by size of victory. This means a team which progresses in a tournament at the expense of another team, due to a higher NRR, may not have truly performed better than their opponents.

In the Cricket World Cup, the first use of NRR was in the 1992 tournament. Earlier tournaments used run rate instead as the tie-breaker.

== Step by step explanation ==
A team's run rate (RR), or runs per over (RPO), is the average number of runs scored per over by the whole team in the whole innings (or the whole innings so far), i.e. $\text{run rate }=\frac{\text{total runs scored}}{\text{total overs faced}}$.

So if a team scores 481 runs off 50 overs then their RR is $\frac{481}{50} = 9.62$. Note that as an over is made up of six balls, each ball is 1/6 of an over, despite being normally written in cricket's notation as .1 of an over. So if they got that same score off 48.1 overs, their RR would be $\frac{481}{48\frac{1}{6}} = 9.986$.

The concept of net run rate involves subtracting the opponents' run rate from the team's run rate, i.e. $\text{match net run rate }=\frac{\text{total runs scored}}{\text{total overs faced}}-\frac{\text{total runs conceded }}{\text{total overs bowled}}$.

For two teams which have just played, the winning side will have a positive Match NRR, and the losing side will have the negative of this (i.e. the Match NRRs will be additive inverses, summing to zero). A single match's NRR is used very rarely, perhaps only after a team has played one match in a tournament, so their tournament NRR is the same as the match NRR.

Usually, runs and overs are summed together throughout a season to compare teams in a league table. A team's overall NRR for a tournament is not defined as the sum or average of the NRR's from the individual matches, but as:

$\text{tournament net run rate }=\frac{\text{total runs scored in all matches}}{\text{total overs faced in all matches}} - \frac{\text{total runs conceded in all matches}}{\text{total overs bowled in all matches}}$

The exceptions to this are:

- If a team is bowled out, the calculations don't use the number of overs actually bowled, but the full quota of overs to which the team was entitled (e.g. 50 overs for a One Day International, and 20 overs for a Twenty20 match).
- If a match is interrupted, Duckworth-Lewis revised targets are set, and a result is subsequently achieved, the revised targets and revised overs are used for Team 1's innings (i.e. 1 run less than the final Target Score for Team 2, off the total number of overs allocated to Team 2), and the actual runs scored and overs used by Team 2 are used for Team 2's innings (as normal).
- If a match is abandoned or has no result, none of the runs scored or overs bowled count towards this calculation.
- If a match is abandoned but a result decided by retrospectively applying Duckworth-Lewis, the number of overs assigned to each team for this calculation is the number of overs actually faced by Team 2. Team 1 is credited with Team 2's Par Score (the number of runs they would need to have reached from this number of overs and wickets lost if they were going to match Team 1's score), and the actual runs scored are used by Team 2 for Team 2's innings.

== Permutations ==
All scenarios assume One Day International rules with 50 overs per side.

=== 1. Side that bats first wins ===
- Team A bat first and score 287–6 off their full quota of 50 overs. Team A's Run Rate is $\frac{287}{50} = 5.74$.
- Team B fail in their run chase, scoring 243–8 in their 50 overs. Team B's Run Rate is $\frac{243}{50} = 4.86$.
- Team A's NRR for this game is 5.74 − 4.86 = 0.88. If this was the first game of the season, their NRR for the league table would be +0.88.
- Team B's NRR for this game is 4.86 − 5.74 = −0.88. If this was the first game of the season, their NRR for the league table would be −0.88.

=== 2. Side that bats second wins ===
- Team A bat first and score 265–8 off their full quota of 50 overs. Team A's Run Rate is $\frac{265}{50} = 5.30$.
- Team B successfully chase, getting their winning runs with a four with 2.4 of the 50 overs remaining, leaving them on 267–5. Team B faced 47.2 overs, so their Run Rate is $\frac{267}{47\frac{2}{6}} = 5.64$.
- Assuming that Team A and Team B had previously played as in the game in scenario one, the new tournament NRR for Team A would be: $\frac{287+265}{50+ 50}-\frac{243+267}{50+47\frac{2}{6}} = \frac{552}{100}-\frac{510}{97\frac{2}{6}} = 5.52 - 5.24 = 0.28$.

=== 3. Side that bats first is bowled out, side batting second wins ===
- Team A bat first and are bowled out for 127 off 25.1 overs. Despite their run rate for the balls they faced being 127 / 25.667 = 4.95, because they were bowled out the entire 50 overs are added to their total overs faced tally for the tournament, and Team B are credited with having bowled 50 overs.
- Team B reach the target off 30.5 overs, ending with 128–3. Team B actually scored at a slower pace (128/30.833 = 4.15), however they managed to protect their wickets and win. Thus, only the 30.833 overs are added to the seasonal tally.
- Team A's NRR for this game is $\frac{127}{50}-\frac{128}{30\frac{5}{6}} = -1.61$.
- Team B's NRR for this game is $\frac{128}{30\frac{5}{6}}-\frac{127}{50} = +1.61$.
- If 25.667 had been used for Team A's overs total rather than 50, Team A would have finished the match with a positive match NRR, and improved tournament NRR, despite losing. (Similarly Team B with a worsened NRR, despite winning.)

=== 4. Side that bats second is bowled out, side batting first therefore wins ===
- Team A bat first and set a formidable 295–5 off their complement of 50 overs. Therefore, for the tournament NRR calculations, 295 runs and 50 overs are added to Team A's runs scored/overs faced tally and Team B's runs conceded/overs bowled tally.
- Team B never get close, being bowled out for 116 off 35.4 overs. Therefore, as they were bowled out, 116 runs and 50 overs are added to Team A's runs conceded/overs bowled tally and Team B's runs scored/overs faced tally.

=== 5. Both sides are bowled out, side batting first therefore wins ===
- Team A bat first, and manage 127 off 25.1 overs on a difficult playing surface. Team B fall agonizingly short, reaching 120 off 30.5 overs.
- In this case, both teams get 50 overs both faced and bowled in the overs column for the season, just as in example 1.

=== 6. The game ends in a tie ===
- Runs and overs are added as in the examples above, with teams bowled out being credited with their full quota of overs. Thus, the match NRR will always be zero for both teams.

=== 7. Interrupted game with revised D/L target ===
- In matches where Duckworth-Lewis revised targets are set due to interruptions which reduce the number of overs bowled, those revised targets and revised overs are used to calculate the NRR for both teams.
- For example, Team A are dismissed for 165 in 33.5 overs. Team B progresses to 120–0, but play is halted after 18 overs due to rain.
- Six overs are lost, and the target is reset to 150 from 44 overs, which Team B reach comfortably after 26.2 overs.
- Because the target was revised to 150 runs from 44 overs, Team A's total is reset to 149 from 44 overs, thus their RR $= \frac{149}{44} \approx 3.39$. Team B's RR, however, is computed as normal: $\frac{150}{26.33} \approx 5.70$.
- Computing the match NRR for Team A gives us 3.39 – 5.70 = –2.31. Team B's NRR is: 5.70 – 3.39 = +2.31.

=== 8. Abandoned game recorded as no result ===
- Abandoned games are not considered, whatever the stage of the game at stoppage may be, and the scores in such games are immaterial to NRR calculations.

=== 9. Abandoned game with retrospective D/L result ===
- Team A score 254 runs from their 50 overs. Team B have scored 172–4 from 30 overs when the match is abandoned.
- According to Duckworth-Lewis, 6 wickets and 20 overs in hand equates to 44.6% of resources, so Team B has used 55.4% of its resources, so their Par Score is 254 x 55.4% = 140.716 runs. As they are ahead of this, they are declared the winner.
- Team A's RR $=\frac{\text{Par Score for Team B}}{\text{Overs faced by Team B}} = \frac{140}{30} \approx 4.67$.
- Team B's RR $=\frac{\text{Runs scored by Team B}}{\text{Overs faced by Team B}} = \frac{172}{30} \approx 5.73$.

== Net Run Rate within a tournament ==
=== Basic example ===
Most of the time, in limited overs cricket tournaments, there are round-robin groups among several teams, where each team plays all of the others. Just as explained in the scenarios above, the NRR is not the average of the NRRs of all the matches played, it is calculated considering the overall rate at which runs are scored for and against, within the whole group.

Here is an example South Africa's net run rate in the 1999 World Cup.

FOR

South Africa scored:

- Against India, 254 runs (for 6 wkts) from 47.2 overs.
- Against Sri Lanka, 199 runs (for 9 wkts) from 50 overs.
- Against England, 225 runs (for 7 wkts) from 50 overs.
- Against Kenya, 153 runs (for 3 wkts) from 41 overs.
- Against Zimbabwe, 185 runs (all out) from 47.2 overs.

In the case of Zimbabwe, because South Africa were all out before their allotted 50 overs expired, the run rate is calculated as if they had scored their runs over the full 50 overs. Therefore, across the five games, South Africa scored 1016 runs in a total of 238 overs and 2 balls (i.e. 238.333 overs), an average run rate of 1016/238.333 = 4.263.

AGAINST

Teams opposing South Africa scored:

- India, 253 (for 5 wkts) from 50 overs.
- Sri Lanka, 110 (all out) from 35.2 overs.
- England, 103 (all out) from 41 overs.
- Kenya, 152 (all out) from 44.3 overs.
- Zimbabwe, 233 (for 6 wkts) from 50 overs.

Again, with Sri Lanka, England and Kenya counting as the full 50 overs as they were all out, the run rate scored against South Africa across the five games is calculated on the basis of 851 runs in a total of 250 overs, an average run rate of 851/250 = 3.404.

NET RUN RATE

South Africa's final tournament NRR is therefore 4.263 − 3.404 = +0.859.

=== Change in NRR through a tournament ===
After match one

In the above example of South Africa at the 1999 World Cup, after their first match their tournament NRR was $\frac{\mbox{254}}{\mbox{47.33}} - \frac{\mbox{253}}{\mbox{50}}.$

As Run Rate = Runs scored/Overs faced, the runs scored by and against South Africa in each innings can be replaced in this formula by Run Rate x Overs faced. They scored 254 runs from 47.33 overs, a rate of 5.37 runs per over. Therefore, the total of 254 runs can be replaced by 5.37 runs per over x 47.33 overs. Similarly, the total of 253 runs conceded can be replaced by 5.06 runs per over x 50 overs:

$\left(5.37\times\frac{\mbox{47.33}}{\mbox{47.33}}\right) - \left(5.06\times\frac{\mbox{50}}{\mbox{50}}\right) = \left(5.37\times 100\%\right)-\left(5.06\times 100\%\right).$

After match two

After their second match, tournament NRR was $\frac{\mbox{254 + 199}}{\mbox{47.33 + 50}} - \frac{\mbox{253 + 110}}{\mbox{50 + 50}},$ which is the same as $\frac{\mbox{254}}{\mbox{97.33}} + \frac{\mbox{199}}{\mbox{97.33}} - \frac{\mbox{253}}{\mbox{100}} - \frac{\mbox{110}}{\mbox{100}}.$

Making the same replacements for 254 and 253 as before, and replacing 199 runs scored in match two with 3.98 runs per over x 50 overs, and 110 runs conceded in match two with 2.20 runs per over x 50 overs, this becomes:

$\left(5.37\times\frac{\mbox{47.33}}{\mbox{97.33}}\right) + \left(3.98\times\frac{\mbox{50}}{\mbox{97.33}}\right) - \left(5.06\times\frac{\mbox{50}}{\mbox{100}}\right) - \left(2.20\times\frac{\mbox{50}}{\mbox{100}}\right)$

$=\left(5.37\times 48.6\%\right)+\left(3.98\times 51.4\%\right)-\left(5.06\times 50\%\right)-\left(2.20\times 50\%\right).$

After match three

After their third match, tournament NRR was $\frac{\mbox{254 + 199 + 225}}{\mbox{47.33 + 50 + 50}} - \frac{\mbox{253 + 110 + 103}}{\mbox{50 + 50 + 50}},$ i.e. $\frac{\mbox{254}}{\mbox{147.33}} + \frac{\mbox{199}}{\mbox{147.33}} + \frac{\mbox{225}}{\mbox{147.33}} - \frac{\mbox{253}}{\mbox{150}} - \frac{\mbox{110}}{\mbox{150}} - \frac{\mbox{103}}{\mbox{150}}.$

Making the same replacements for 254, 253, 199 and 110 as before, and replacing 225 runs scored in match three with 4.50 runs per over x 50 overs, and 103 runs conceded in match three with 2.06 runs per over x 50 overs, this becomes:

$\left(5.37\times\frac{\mbox{47.33}}{\mbox{147.33}}\right) + \left(3.98\times\frac{\mbox{50}}{\mbox{147.33}}\right) + \left(4.50\times\frac{\mbox{50}}{\mbox{147.33}}\right) - \left(5.06\times\frac{\mbox{50}}{\mbox{150}}\right) - \left(2.20\times\frac{\mbox{50}}{\mbox{150}}\right) - \left(2.06\times\frac{\mbox{50}}{\mbox{150}}\right)$

$=\left(5.37\times 32.1\%\right) + \left(3.98\times 33.9\%\right) + \left(4.50\times 33.9\%\right) - \left(5.06\times 33.3\%\right) - \left(2.20\times 33.3\%\right) - \left(2.06\times 33.3\%\right).$

Tournament NRR as a weighted average

Therefore, tournament NRR can alternatively be thought of as the weighted average of the run rates scored in each match (weighted by the lengths of the innings batted compared to the other innings batted), minus the weighted average of the run rates conceded in each match (weighted by the lengths of the innings bowled compared to the other innings bowled). Each time another match is played, the weights of the previous innings reduce, and so the contributions of the previous innings to overall NRR reduce.

For example, the 5.37 run rate achieved in match one had 100% weighting after match one, 48.6% weighting after match two, and 32.1% weighting after match three.

== Criticisms ==
=== NRR does not accurately reflect margins of victory, as it takes no account of wickets lost ===
In the language of Duckworth-Lewis-Stern, teams have two resources with which to score runs − overs and wickets. However, NRR takes into account only one of these − overs faced; it takes no account of wickets lost. Therefore, a narrow victory can produce a higher NRR than a comfortable victory. For example, in the 2013 Champions Trophy Group A:

- New Zealand narrowly beat Sri Lanka by bowling them out for 138, then reaching 139–9 from 36.3 overs, giving them match NRR = (139/36.5) − (138/50) = 1.05.
- Sri Lanka comfortably beat England by restricting them to 293–7 from 50 overs, then reaching 297–3 from 47.1 overs, giving them match NRR = (297/47.167) − (293/50) = 0.44.

This fact can encourage a team to play in an overly aggressive manner, to maximise NRR by batting with next to no regard for preserving wickets, when the required run rate alone seems low, which can then put the team in danger of losing.

=== NRR may be manipulated ===
A team may choose to artificially reduce their margin of victory, as measured by NRR, to gain an additional advantage by not disadvantaging their opponent too much. For example, in the final round of matches in the 1999 World Cup Group B, Australia needed to beat West Indies to progress to the Super Six stage, but wanted to carry West Indies through with them to the Super Six, rather than New Zealand. This is because Australia would then have the additional points in the Super Six stage from beating West Indies in the group stage, whereas they had lost to New Zealand in the group stage. It was therefore to Australia's advantage to reduce their scoring rate and reduce their margin of victory, as measured by NRR, to minimise the negative impact of the match on West Indies' NRR, and therefore maximise West Indies' chance of going through with them.

However, this is also likely to be a possibility with alternatives to NRR.

This is similar to the way a narrow victory for one side in a game of football may enable both sides to progress to the next stage, e.g. West Germany v Austria in the 1982 World Cup.

== Alternatives to NRR ==
A number of alternatives or modifications done to NRR is suggested below as following -

=== Duckworth–Lewis–Stern ===
Duckworth Lewis Stern method in used Tournament NRR as present, but when a side batting second successfully completes the run chase, use the Duckworth-Lewis method to predict how many runs they would have scored with a full innings. This means the calculation would be done on the basis of all innings being complete, and so would remove the criticisms of NRR penalising teams which bat second, and NRR not taking into account wickets lost. However, this does nothing to alter the fact that when matches are rain-affected, different matches and even two complete innings in one match, can be different lengths long (in terms of overs), and so does nothing about some of the other criticisms above.

Therefore, alternatively, use Duckworth–Lewis–Stern to predict the 50-over total for every innings less than this, even, for example, if a match is reduced to 40 overs each, and a side completes their 40 overs. This would make every innings in the tournament the same length, so would remove all the criticisms above. However, a side will bat differently (less conservatively) in a 40-over innings compared to a 50-over innings, and so it is quite unfair to use their 40-over total to predict how many runs they could have scored in 50 overs.

=== Average of the match NRRs ===
Calculate tournament NRR as the total or average of the individual match NRRs. This would mean all matches have equal weighting, no matter how long they were, (rather than all batted overs across the tournament having equal weighting, and all bowled overs across the tournament having equal weighting). This would remove the criticisms under the 'Tournament NRR calculation' subheading above. For example, the different teams' tournament NRRs would always sum to zero if the total of the individual match NRRs were used, or if the average of the individual match NRRs were used and all teams had played the same number of games.

An example of when using this would have made a difference was the 1999 Cricket World Cup Group B. New Zealand and West Indies finished level on points. Having scored a total of 723 runs from 201 overs, and conceded 746 runs from 240.4 overs, West Indies' tournament NRR was (723/201) − (746/240.6667) = 0.50. However, New Zealand had scored 817 runs from 196.1 overs, and conceded 877 runs from 244.2 overs, so their tournament NRR was (817/196.167) − (877/244.333) = 0.58. Therefore, New Zealand progressed to the Super Six stage and West Indies were eliminated. However, with individual match NRRs of −0.540, 0.295, 0.444, 5.525 and −0.530, the West Indies' average match NRR was 1.04, and with individual match NRRs of 1.225, 0.461, −0.444, −1.240 and 4.477, New Zealand's average match NRR was 0.90. Therefore, West Indies' average NRR was better than New Zealand's.

=== Head-to-head record or stage a play-off match ===
Split teams level on points using the results from the matches between them. However, this unfairly increases the importance of that one match and reduces the importance of other matches in the league, when all matches in a league should be of equal value − the team with the better head-to-head record will have a worse record against other teams. Also, the head-to-head record will not decide it if the game between them was a No result, or if they played each other twice, and won one game each. An example of where a team progressed further because of a head-to-head result taken into account, was in the 1999 World Cup semi-finals when South Africa vs Australia played to a tie but Australia progressed due to them beating South Africa in the group stages, even though South Africa won more matches.

Alternatively, stage a play-off match between the teams level on points. However, organising this at very short notice may be difficult, or the teams may be in the middle of a league table with no promotion or relegation or progression at stake, so there may be no appetite for a play-off match.

These two methods both also run into difficulties when three or more teams are level on points.
