= 2016 Alamo Bowl (January) =

2016 Valero Alamo Bowl
- 23rd Alamo Bowl
Oregon Ducks	TCU Horned Frogs
(9–3)	(10–2)
Pac-12	Big 12
41	47
Head coach: Mark Helfrich	Head coach: Gary Patterson
AP / Coaches / CFP; 15 / 14 / 15	AP / Coaches / CFP; 11 / 10 / 11
	1	2	3	4	OT	2OT	3OT	Total
Oregon	21	10	0	0	7	3	0	41
TCU	0	0	17	14	7	3	6	47
- Date: January 2, 2016
- Season: 2015
- Stadium: Alamodome
- Location: San Antonio, Texas, U.S.
- MVP: Offensive: Bram Kohlhausen (TCU); Defensive: Travin Howard (TCU); Sportsmanship Award: Rodney Hardrick (ORE)
- Favorite: Oregon by 7
- Referee: Marc Curles (SEC)
- Attendance: 64,569
- Payout: US$7.85 million combined

United States TV coverage
- Network: ESPN/ESPN Radio
- Announcers: Dave Flemming, Mack Brown, & Alison Williams (ESPN); Tom Hart, Andre Ware, & Laura Rutledge (ESPN Radio)
- Nielsen ratings: TBD

The 2016 Alamo Bowl was an American college football bowl game played on January 2, 2016, at the Alamodome in San Antonio, Texas. The 23rd edition of the Alamo Bowl featured the Oregon Ducks from the Pac-12 Conference and the TCU Horned Frogs from the Big 12 Conference. It was televised at 5:45 p.m. CST on ESPN and heard on ESPN Radio. It was one of the 2015–16 bowl games that concluded the 2015 FBS football season. The game was sponsored by the Valero Energy Corporation and was officially known as the Valero Alamo Bowl.

The Horned Frogs trailed 31–0 at halftime, but an injury to Oregon quarterback Vernon Adams Jr. just before the halftime break would result in a scoreless second half for the Ducks. TCU scored on all 9 possessions after halftime (6 in the second half and 3 in overtime), completing the comeback in the second half with a late field goal. The two teams traded touchdowns in the first overtime and field goals in the second. The Horned Frogs scored in the third extra period, failed their 2-point conversion, but held the Ducks out of the end zone. The 31-point comeback tied the largest comeback in NCAA college football bowl game history with the 2006 Insight Bowl.

== Teams ==
Oregon from the Pac-12 Conference (9–3, 7-2 Pac-12) and TCU from the Big 12 Conference (10–2, 7-2 Big 12) were announced to play in this bowl game on December 6, 2015. They arrived on December 27 and 28.

=== Oregon ===
The 2015 season for the Oregon Ducks was a tale of two teams. A finger injury during the first game would keep Oregon quarterback Vernon Adams Jr. sidelined or completely ineffective for a month and by the time Adams returned to form the Ducks stood at 3-3. With a healthy Adams at the helm, the Oregon Ducks finished the season by winning their last 6 games, including a road win over Stanford, a division rival ranked #7 nationally.

=== TCU ===
Starting the 2015 season by winning 8 straight games, the TCU Horned Frogs finished the season by winning 2 of their last 4 games, including a 28–21 double overtime victory over rival Baylor.

The Frogs were playing the bowl game without two key offensive starters. Wide receiver Josh Doctson, a first-team All-American this season, did not play in the Frogs' final two regular-season games due to a wrist injury that required surgery, and was ultimately ruled out of the bowl game. Quarterback Trevone Boykin was suspended from the team for a violation of team rules; according to multiple media reports, he had been involved in a bar fight in San Antonio early in the morning of December 31, and was alleged to have swung at multiple police officers and struck one. Boykin faced several criminal charges in the wake of the incident, the most serious being a felony charge of assaulting a public servant. The suspension caused a dramatic change in the Las Vegas betting line, with TCU going from a 1-point favorite to a 7-point underdog.

After Boykin's suspension, Patterson turned to Bram Kohlhausen, a fifth-year senior walk-on, to start at quarterback. As a high school senior in 2010, he had been rated by ESPN above both Boykin and future Heisman Trophy winner and NFL player Johnny Manziel, and he started his college career at Houston, redshirting in 2011. After seeing little playing time in 2012, he went to the junior college ranks, playing the 2013 season at Los Angeles Harbor College in California and then walking on at TCU. This game would be Kohlhausen's first and only career start at the FBS level.

== Game summary ==
=== Scoring summary ===
Scoring summary

Quarter	Time	Drive			Team	Scoring information	Score	
Quarter	Time	Plays	Yards	TOP	Team	Scoring information	ORE	TCU
1	9:29	8	81	2:32	ORE	Darren Carrington 37-yard touchdown reception from Vernon Adams Jr., Aidan Schneider kick good	7	0
1	5:12	8	79	2:19	ORE	Royce Freeman 4-yard touchdown run, Aidan Schneider kick good	14	0
1	0:27	7	84	1:54	ORE	Royce Freeman 5-yard touchdown run, Aidan Schneider kick good	21	0
2	13:30	3	62	0:43	ORE	Tony Brooks-James 5-yard touchdown run, Aidan Schneider kick good	28	0
2	0:32	9	37	2:47	ORE	47-yard field goal by Aidan Schneider	31	0
3	10:52	10	69	4:08	TCU	24-yard field goal by Jaden Oberkrom	31	3
3	4:18	11	64	4:58	TCU	Jaelan Austin 26-yard touchdown reception from Bram Kohlhausen, Jaden Oberkrom kick good	31	10
3	0:36	7	16	3:31	TCU	Bram Kohlhausen 2-yard touchdown run, Jaden Oberkrom kick good	31	17
4	7:45	11	76	4:13	TCU	34-yard field goal by Jaden Oberkrom	31	20
4	3:32	7	91	3:08	TCU	Aaron Green 2-yard touchdown run, 2-point pass from Shaun Nixon to Buck Jones good	31	28
4	0:19	8	31	1:58	TCU	22-yard field goal by Jaden Oberkrom	31	31
OT	–	4	25	–	TCU	Emanuel Porter 7-yard touchdown reception from Bram Kohlhausen, Jaden Oberkrom kick good	31	38
OT	–	6	25	–	ORE	Royce Freeman 1-yard touchdown run, Aidan Schneider kick good	38	38
2OT	–	4	-2	–	ORE	44-yard field goal by Aidan Schneider	41	38
2OT	–	4	-3	–	TCU	46-yard field goal by Jaden Oberkrom	41	41
3OT	–	3	25	–	TCU	Bram Kohlhausen 8-yard touchdown run, 2-point pass from Bram Kohlhausen failed	41	47
"TOP" = time of possession. For other American football terms, see Glossary of American football.							41	47

=== Statistics ===
Statistics	Oregon	TCU
First downs	21	27
Total offense, plays – yards	83–419	94–545
Rushes-yards (net)	48–186	47–174
Passing yards (net)	233	371
Passes, Comp-Att-Int	20–35–0	30–47–1
Time of Possession	24:18	35:42

== Aftermath ==
Two days after the game, Oregon coach Mark Helfrich demoted defensive coordinator Don Pellum to linebackers coach. Pellum, a former Ducks linebacker who had been involved with the program for more than 30 years as a player, administrator, and coach, had been criticized for the shortcomings of Oregon's defense in 2015. The Ducks finished the season ranked 93rd or worse (among 128 FBS teams) in eight defensive categories, and had set a school record for most points allowed per game at 37.5. The Ducks also lost outside linebackers coach Erik Chinander, who accepted the defensive coordinator position at UCF.

Shortly after Kohlhausen was named offensive MVP for the game, he found out that TCU had begun the process of placing him on scholarship for his final semester in spring 2016.

== See also ==
- Houston Oilers at Buffalo Bills, 1993 Wildcard Playoff – Bills come back from a 35–3 third-quarter deficit to win in overtime. Known in NFL lore as "The Comeback". Largest comeback in NFL playoff history.
- Monday Night Miracle – The New York Jets, trailing the Miami Dolphins 30–7 entering the fourth quarter, tie the game at 30 and 37 in that quarter, winning in overtime.
- 2006 Michigan State vs. Northwestern football game – a 35-point comeback. Largest comeback in college football history (regular season or bowl game).
- 2006 Insight Bowl – the only other comeback from a 31-point deficit in any bowl game.
- Choke at Doak – Florida State comes back from 31–3 deficit in fourth quarter to tie the game with the Florida Gators, 31–31, before the inception of overtime in Division I-A college football.
- Super Bowl LI – Patriots rally from 28–3 deficit to win 34–28 in overtime. As such, the game is commonly referred to as "28–3" due to the Falcons choke.
- 2015 Armed Forces Bowl (January) – Houston rallies from 31–6 deficit with 11 minutes remaining in 4th quarter to beat Pittsburgh 35–34. This remains the largest fourth quarter comeback in college football bowl history.
- 2022 Indianapolis Colts–Minnesota Vikings game – Vikings rally from 33–0 down at halftime to win 39–36 in overtime. This surpassed "The Comeback" as the largest comeback in NFL history.
