= 2006 Insight Bowl =

- 18th Insight Bowl
- Insight Bowl logo
Texas Tech Red Raiders	Minnesota Golden Gophers
(7–5)	(6–6)
Big 12	Big Ten
44	41
Head coach: Mike Leach	Head coach: Glen Mason
	1	2	3	4	OT	Total
Texas Tech	0	7	7	24	6	44
Minnesota	14	21	3	0	3	41
- Date: December 29, 2006
- Season: 2006
- Stadium: Sun Devil Stadium
- Location: Tempe, Arizona
- MVP: QB Graham Harrell (Texas Tech); CB Antonio Huffman (Texas Tech)
- Referee: Ron Cherry (ACC)
- Attendance: 48,391

United States TV coverage
- Network: NFL Network
- Announcers: Derrin Horton, Dick Vermeil, and Alex Flanagan
- Nielsen ratings: 0.93

The 2006 Insight Bowl was a college football bowl game, the 18th edition of the Insight Bowl. It was played on December 29 at Sun Devil Stadium on the campus of Arizona State University in Tempe, Arizona, pitting the Texas Tech Red Raiders against the Minnesota Golden Gophers.

Texas Tech, after falling behind 38–7 with 7:47 remaining in the third quarter, rallied to score 31 unanswered points to send the game to overtime. The Gophers scored a field goal in overtime, but the Red Raiders responded with a touchdown to win. The Red Raiders' 31-point comeback is tied with that of TCU against Oregon in the January 2016 Alamo Bowl for the largest in Division I FBS postseason history.

The game was televised by the NFL Network, which as of December 31, 2006 has made the game available free for online viewing.

== Game summary ==
=== First quarter ===
A decision by Red Raiders coach Mike Leach on their opening possession set the initial tone for the game. Tech faced a fourth-and-1 on their own 45-yard line, and Leach went for it. Quarterback Graham Harrell was stopped on a sneak, giving the ball to the Golden Gophers. Six plays later, Gophers QB Bryan Cupito connected on a 2-yard touchdown pass with tight end Jack Simmons.

The Raiders' next possession was even more disastrous for them, as Harrell was intercepted by Mike Sherels on Tech's 37-yard line. Amir Pinnix, who would run for 179 yards in the game, scored on a 2-yard run six plays later.

Tech then drove the ball inside the Gophers' 10, but Harrell fumbled on a sack and the Gophers' Steve Davis recovered on their own 13. Minnesota then went on its longest scoring drive of the season, ending with a 1-yard touchdown run by Justin Valentine on the first play of the second quarter.

=== Second quarter ===
The Red Raiders lost another scoring chance when cornerback Antonio Huffman, who intercepted a Cupito pass on the Gophers 20, fumbled into the end zone on the return, allowing the Gophers to recover for a touchback. The Gophers took full advantage, going on a drive that culminated in a 14-yard touchdown pass from Cupito to Ernie Wheelwright.

Tech finally got on the board with 4:32 left in the quarter when Shannon Woods capped off a seven-play, 77-yard drive with a 1-yard touchdown run. The Gophers replied with an 81-yard drive ending in a 3-yard Cupito touchdown pass to Logan Payne with 32 seconds left. The first half ended with the Gophers ahead 35–7.

=== Third quarter ===
Minnesota took the opening kickoff of the second half and kept the ball for 16 plays and 7:13, ending with a 32-yard field goal by Joel Monroe.

With 7:47 remaining in the quarter, Texas Tech began its comeback on its next possession, ending when Harrell hit Joel Filani for a 43-yard touchdown pass with 4:58 to go in the quarter. Tech's defense forced a punt on the Gophers' next possession, and the offense went on another drive. The quarter ended with Minnesota up 38–14.

=== Fourth quarter ===
The Raiders scored on the first play of the fourth quarter on an 8-yard touchdown pass from Harrell to Robert Johnson to make it 38-21 with 14:56 left on the clock.

Minnesota responded with a drive of its own inside the Tech 30, but it stalled there. In what would prove to be a critical decision, Mason decided not to try a field goal, instead going for it on fourth-and-7 from the Tech 31. Cupito was sacked, giving Tech the ball on their own 37. They proceeded to cut the score to 38–28 on a 1-yard run by Harrell.

The Gophers went three-and-out on their next possession. Danny Amendola returned the ensuing punt 40 yards, giving the Raiders good field position on their own 44. Nine plays later, Woods scored his second touchdown of the evening on a 1-yard run; the conversion cut the Minnesota lead to 38–35. However, the Red Raiders failed on an onside kick attempt. While they forced another three-and-out by Minnesota, they had to use their last two timeouts during the series, and the ensuing punt left the Raiders on their own 12. A false start penalty on the first play sent them back to their own 7.

From there, Harrell ran Tech's hurry-up offense to perfection, completing five of seven passes, with the receivers successful in going out of bounds to stop the clock four times. Tech also caught breaks with two 9-yard gains that caused game officials to stop the clock for measurements. The eighth play of the final drive was Alex Trlica's 52-yard field goal as time expired that sent the game to overtime.

=== Overtime ===
Minnesota got the ball first in overtime. Six plays later, Monroe gave the Gophers a 41–38 lead with a 32-yard field goal. Tech responded on its possession with a five-play sequence that ended in Woods' winning touchdown run, his third of the night, from three yards out.

== Aftermath ==
Harrell, who threw for 445 yards and two touchdowns while also running for a touchdown, was chosen as the offensive MVP. Tech cornerback Antonio Huffman was defensive MVP. Other top performers for Tech included Woods (109 yards and three touchdowns rushing) and Filani (nine catches for 144 yards and a touchdown).

In addition to Pinnix, other leading performers for Minnesota included Cupito (263 yards and three touchdowns passing) and Simmons (seven catches for 134 yards and a touchdown). Simmons was filling in for the injured Matt Spaeth, the winner of the John Mackey Award as the nation's leading tight end. The Gophers set a school bowl scoring record, and Cupito tied the Minnesota career record for touchdown passes with 55.

Two days after his team's loss in the Insight Bowl, Minnesota head coach Glen Mason was fired. Minnesota athletic director Joel Maturi did not publicly detail the reasons for the firing, but strongly hinted that the Gophers' collapse was the proverbial last straw, saying "If we had not lost the way we lost, we probably wouldn't be here today." This was the latest in a series of Minnesota second-half collapses under Mason, which also included one of the previous three biggest bowl collapses in Division I-A history.

== See also ==
- Houston Oilers at Buffalo Bills, 1993 Wildcard Playoff
- The Monday Night Miracle
- 2001 GMAC Bowl, previously the largest comeback in bowl history
- 2006 Michigan State vs. Northwestern football game (a 35-point comeback earlier in the 2006 college season)
- 2016 Alamo Bowl (January), tied the largest comeback in bowl history
