= Run rate =

Terminology used in the sport of cricket

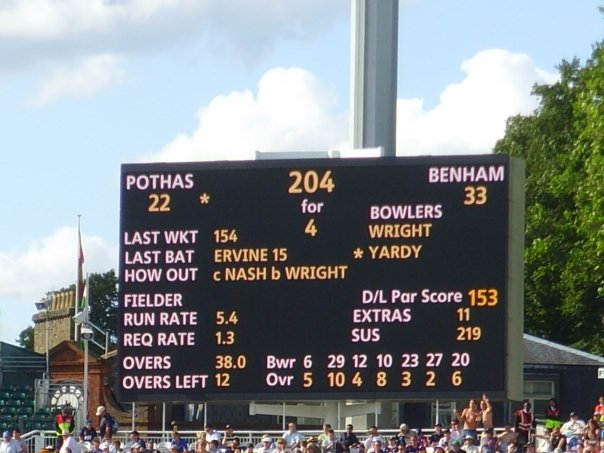
Scoreboard showing Run rate achieved in the innings so far (5.4, that is, 204 ÷ 38), and Run rate required from this point onwards to win (1.3).

In cricket, the run rate (RR), or runs per over (RPO), is the average number of runs a batting side scores per over. It includes all runs made by the batting side in the innings to that point of the game, both the runs scored by the batsmen and extras conceded by the bowling team.

== Values ==
What counts as a good run rate depends on the nature of the pitch, the type of match and the level of the game. A Test match held over five days typically has a lower run rate than a limited-overs game, because batsmen adopt a more cautious approach. In recent years, the average Test run rate has been between 3 and 3.5 runs per over, sometimes even lower whereas in limited overs cricket the batsmen must adopt a more gung-ho approach in order to achieve the necessary score to win. In One Day International (50 over) cricket, the average run rate has been increasing from around 4 when the format was first played in the 1970s to over 5 in recent years. Only England has ever scored at more than 9 runs per over, scoring at 8 or 7 is a good run rate, as there are 50 overs, and losing wickets is always a worry. In the 20 over Twenty20 International cricket, the average run rate is between 8 and 9 runs per over. This is the shortest format of the game and hitting out in this is a necessity. The highest run-rate ever has been around 13-14.

Without extras and overthrows, the maximum possible run rate is 36 – if every ball were struck for six and, as such, this has never happened in a completed match, and only happens in a single over very rarely.

== Uses ==
The main use for run rate in limited overs cricket is to compare the run rate achieved by the batting team (runs scored per completed over) against the run rate required to win the game (runs required per overs remaining). Teams normally try to increase their run rate in the final overs. Fielding restriction rules, now known as Powerplays, are used by the cricket authorities to encourage faster scoring in the earlier part of the innings.

As the game reaches a point closer to the end of the match it is common to switch from using run rate required to runs required from balls remaining (i.e., instead of saying a required run rate of 6 from 3 remaining overs, it is more common to say that they required 18 runs from 18 balls remaining).

Before the advent of the Duckworth-Lewis method, run rate was one of a number of methods used to determine the winner of a game which had been curtailed due to rain or bad light (in the Average Run Rate method). It can also be used to separate teams in a league table with the same win–loss record, though that is usually done by the net run rate method.

== See also ==
- Required run rate
- Net run rate
- Economy rate (cricket)
