= 2006 Michigan State vs. Northwestern football game =

College football game that featured the largest comeback in FBS history

Michigan State Spartans	Northwestern Wildcats
(3–4)	(2–5)
41	38
Head coach: John L. Smith	Head coach: Pat Fitzgerald
	1	2	3	4	Total
Michigan State	3	0	14	24	41
Northwestern	7	17	14	0	38
- Date: October 21, 2006
- Season: 2006
- Stadium: Ryan Field
- Location: Evanston, IL

United States TV coverage
- Network: ESPN Plus

The 2006 Michigan State vs. Northwestern football game featured the biggest comeback in NCAA Division I Football Bowl Subdivision (FBS) history. The Spartans rallied to score 38 unanswered points to beat the Wildcats 41–38 after falling behind 38–3 with 9:54 left in the third quarter.

== Game summary ==
=== First quarter ===
Michigan State started the game with a 66-yard drive that ended with a Brett Swenson 32-yard field goal. Northwestern's first drive ended with quarterback C. J. Bachér finding Ross Lane for a 5-yard touchdown that gave the Wildcats a 7–3 lead.

=== Second quarter ===
The Wildcats' first drive of the second quarter resulted in Bachér rushing for a 2-yard touchdown. The Spartans were forced to punt on the ensuing drive. Northwestern's Joel Howells kicked a 30-yard field goal on the next drive. On the following drive, Michigan State was once again forced to punt. After the punt, Northwestern scored another touchdown on a Brandon Roberson 18-yard pass to Shaun Herbert. Michigan State's woes continued on their next drive, when they fumbled the football. However, Howells missed a 36-yard field goal at the end of the first half. The half ended with the Spartans down 24–3.

=== Third quarter ===
Northwestern began the third quarter with an 80-yard drive that resulted in a Bachér 22-yard touchdown pass to Lane. On the first play of the next drive, Drew Stanton was intercepted. Northwestern capitalized on the great field position with Herbert catching a 5-yard touchdown pass, giving Northwestern a 38–3 lead. Michigan State began the comeback with a nine play, 65-yard drive that was capped off with an 18-yard touchdown pass from quarterback Stanton to running back Jehuu Caulcrick. Following a Northwestern punt, Michigan State scored again, finishing an eight play, 53-yard drive with a 4-yard touchdown run from A.J. Jimmerson. On the ensuing drive, the Wildcats had gained 69 yards in only 5 plays when Bachér was intercepted at the goal line by Michigan State middle linebacker Kaleb Thornhill. The quarter ended with the Spartans down 38–17.

=== Fourth quarter ===
Michigan State's chances of completing the comeback appeared to be finished early in the fourth quarter when backup quarterback Brian Hoyer had his 6th pass of the drive intercepted by Northwestern a minute in. However, after failing to convert a short third down at midfield, the Wildcats had their punt blocked by Devin Thomas and returned for a touchdown by Ashton Henderson. Northwestern's next two drives also ended in punts, and each ensuing Spartan drive resulted in a touchdown. With the score tied at 38, the Wildcats had the ball on their own 15 yard line with 3:32 left in regulation. On the first play of the series, Bachér was intercepted by the Spartans' Travis Key at the Northwestern 40. The interception was returned to the 30 yard line. The Spartans ran the ball for the duration of the drive, advancing the ball to Northwestern's 11 yard line with 18 seconds left. MSU kicker Swenson hit a 28-yard field goal to give the Spartans the lead.

The Wildcats would get the ball one more time, returning the ensuing kickoff to their own 37 yard line. Following an offsides penalty which moved the ball to the 42 yard line, Northwestern's final play for the end zone was unsuccessful and the Spartans won 41–38.

== Fallout ==
Michigan State had started the season off 3–0, including an impressive win over Pittsburgh. In their next game against Notre Dame, they lost despite leading by 16 entering the 4th quarter. Their next 3 games were losses to Illinois, Michigan, and Ohio State. The comeback was thought to save John L. Smith's career at Michigan State, but on November 1, 2006, the university announced that Smith would not be brought back after the season as the Spartans finished with four more losses after this game.

Northwestern, by contrast, had already fallen out of bowl contention. The Wildcats would play a competitive game against Michigan the following week, and would defeat the bowl-bound Iowa Hawkeyes two weeks later.

== See also ==
- 1984 Maryland vs. Miami (FL) football game, the previous record holder for the biggest Division I-A comeback
- 2006 Insight Bowl, a 2006 bowl game that saw the biggest comeback in NCAA Division I-A postseason history
- 2016 Alamo Bowl (January), a 2016 bowl game that tied the biggest comeback in NCAA Division I-A postseason history
- 2022 Indianapolis Colts–Minnesota Vikings game, largest comeback in NFL history
- The Monday Night Miracle
