= Ernie Sims =

American football player and coach (born 1984)

Florida State Seminoles
- Title: Interim defensive coordinator & linebackers coach

Personal information
- Born: December 23, 1984 (age 41); Tallahassee, Florida, U.S.
- Listed height: 6 ft 0 in (1.83 m)
- Listed weight: 233 lb (106 kg)

Career information
- High school: North Florida Christian (Tallahassee)
- College: Florida State (2003–2005)
- NFL draft: 2006: 1st round, 9th overall pick

Career history

Playing
- Detroit Lions (2006–2009); Philadelphia Eagles (2010); Indianapolis Colts (2011); Dallas Cowboys (2012–2013); Arizona Cardinals (2014)*
- * Offseason or practice squad member only

Coaching
- Florida Atlantic (2018) Assistant strength & conditioning coordinator; South Florida (2020–2022); Defensive quality control analyst (2020); Linebackers coach (2021–2022); Interim defensive coordinator (2022); UCF (2023) Linebackers coach; Florida State (2024–present); Assistant linebackers coach & defensive analyst (2024–2025); Linebackers coach (2026); Interim defensive coordinator (2026–present)

Operations
- Florida Atlantic (2019) Director of football operations

Awards and highlights
- PFWA All-Rookie Team (2006); First-team All-American (2004); Second-team All-ACC (2004)

Career NFL statistics
- Total tackles: 623
- Sacks: 5.5
- Forced fumbles: 6
- Fumble recoveries: 3
- Interceptions: 1
- Stats at Pro Football Reference

Ernie Sims III (born December 23, 1984) is an American college football coach and former professional player who is currently the interim defensive coordinator and linebackers coach at Florida State University. He was previously a linebacker in the National Football League (NFL) for nine seasons. He played college football for the Florida State Seminoles and was selected by the Detroit Lions in the first round of the 2006 NFL draft. He also played for the Philadelphia Eagles, Indianapolis Colts and Dallas Cowboys.

== Early life ==
A native of Tallahassee, Florida, Sims attended North Florida Christian High School, where he began his high school football career by earning a varsity letter while only in the eighth grade. A two-way player at running back and linebacker, Sims earned a total of five varsity letters. Playing in Class A, Florida's smallest classification, Sims led the Eagles to four state championships from 1998 to 2001. In his senior year, however, North Florida was eliminated in the region semifinals of the Class A playoffs, losing to Jay 19–14. As a junior, he totaled 180 tackles, 41 tackles for loss, 12 sacks and forced seven fumbles on defense and rushed for over 600 yards and 17 touchdowns as a tailback. During his senior year, Sims registered 133 tackles (73 solo stops), 15 tackles for lost yardage, six forced fumbles, seven fumble recoveries and one blocked field goal attempt from his linebacker position and ran for 1,081 yards on 115 carries for 23 touchdowns as a running back.

Sims earned All-American honors by Parade and USA Today. Rivals.com ranked Sims as not only the top linebacker in his class but as the top prospect in the country. As of 2023, Sims remained the only linebacker ranked atop of the Rivals annual rankings. Recruited by several schools within the nation, Sims took official visits to Georgia, Florida, Auburn, Miami (FL), and Florida State. On National Signing Day, Sims chose the Seminoles over the Gators.

== College career ==
At Florida State, Sims wore #34, a number that was retired in honor of former Seminole football player, Ron Sellers. Sellers gave Sims and the university permission for Sims to wear the jersey number.

In 2003, as a true freshman at Florida State, Sims played in all 13 games of the season, including the Orange Bowl against Miami (FL), as a back-up outside linebacker. He finished ninth on the team with 42 tackles, and added two tackles for lost yardage, two pass break-ups, three quarterback hurries and a forced fumble. Sims was also one of the Seminoles' top special teams performers. He earned ACC Rookie of the Week for his efforts against Wake Forest, which included a season-high 10 tackles.

As a sophomore, Sims played in all 12 games, and made the starting lineup by the second week. For his exceptional play on the field in 2004, Sims was named to the second All-ACC team and ESPN named Sims to their first-team All-American team. He finished second on the team with a single-season career-high 86 tackles, behind only A. J. Nicholson (88). Sims also recorded a single-season career-high nine tackles for lost yardage, 4.5 quarterback sacks, nine quarterback hurries, five pass break-ups, two forced fumbles and a blocked kick. In three games (North Carolina, Duke, and Florida), Sims recorded double-digit tackles, including a career-high 12 tackles against the Gators. In the Seminoles' 36–3 victory over Virginia, he had nine tackles, a career-high two sacks and a blocked punt. Sims followed that performance with eight tackles, one tackle for lost yardage, a sack and a pass break-up against Wake Forest. Each of those weeks, Sims earned ACC Defensive Back of the Week, as the only player in the ACC to earn the ACC Defensive Back of the Week honors multiple times during the season.

In July 2005, Sims was arrested on charges of battery and resisting an officer, allegedly shoving his then-girlfriend "repeatedly to the ground" during an argument in the parking lot of a FSU residence hall. Expectations for his junior year were high, as The Sporting News and other publications named him to their pre-season All-American teams. Sims had a productive, but not spectacular junior season, starting all 13 games, including the Orange Bowl.

Sims majored in Environmental Studies at Florida State. In January 2006, Sims announced that he would forgo his senior season to focus on a career in the NFL.

== Professional career ==
Pre-draft measurables
Height	Weight	Arm length	Hand span	40-yard dash	10-yard split	20-yard split	20-yard shuttle	Three-cone drill	Vertical jump	Broad jump	Bench press
5 ft 11 1/8 in (1.81 m)	231 lb (105 kg)	30 3/4 in (0.78 m)	9 1/4 in (0.23 m)	4.54 s	1.54 s	2.61 s	4.22 s	7.31 s	41 in (1.04 m)	10 ft 5 in (3.18 m)	25 reps
All results from NFL Combine

=== Detroit Lions ===
Described as a "three-down linebacker who plays bigger than his listed size", Sims was selected as ninth overall in the first round of the 2006 NFL draft by the Detroit Lions. Sims was targeted by Lions general manager Matt Millen to bolster the Lions' defense at weakside linebacker. He was the highest selected Seminoles defender since Corey Simon in 2000.

On July 30, 2006, he signed a 5-year, $15.735 million contract with $12.1 million guaranteed. Sims started all 16 games his rookie season at outside linebacker, collecting 124 tackles (81 solo tackles) and was credited with a half sack and one pass deflection. On December 3, against the New England Patriots, Sims had a career-high 13 total tackles. On December 31, Sims made a key tackle on fourth down to give the Lions a big win against the Dallas Cowboys. On September 3, 2007, Sims was named one of five captains for the 2007 Detroit Lions. The Lions former head coach, Rod Marinelli, said that Sims' resembled that of Tampa Bay Buccaneers linebacker Derrick Brooks in his early years, being described as a fast, punishing, sure-tackler.

=== Philadelphia Eagles ===
Sims was traded to the Philadelphia Eagles on April 19, 2010, in a three-team trade. The Denver Broncos sent tight end Tony Scheffler and a seventh-round draft pick in 2010 to the Detroit Lions, the Lions sent Sims to the Eagles, and the Eagles sent a fifth-round draft pick in 2010 to the Broncos.

=== Indianapolis Colts ===
On August 2, 2011, Sims signed with the Indianapolis Colts as an unrestricted free agent. He wasn't re-signed at the end of the year.

=== Dallas Cowboys ===
After the loss of Sean Lee to injury, on October 24, 2012, the Dallas Cowboys signed him as an unrestricted free agent to provide depth at linebacker. Sims quickly became a starter by his second game (against the Atlanta Falcons) and eventually the unit's defensive play caller, after injuries decimated the position further. He finished the season with 42 tackles, one sack, 2 quarterback pressures and 3 passes defensed. He also recorded 10 tackles in the Cowboys' emotional week 14 win against the Cincinnati Bengals, a day after the team received news of the death of Jerry Brown and the arrest of Josh Brent.

On March 18, 2013, Sims was signed to a one-year contract at the league minimum salary. He registered 42 tackles, a forced fumble and started 6 games while replacing Bruce Carter, Justin Durant and Sean Lee at different times. He wasn't re-signed at the end of the season.

=== Arizona Cardinals ===
On June 3, 2014, Sims signed 1-year deal to replace the suspended Daryl Washington. He was released on August 7.

=== NFL statistics ===
Year	Team	GP	COMB	TOTAL	AST	SACK	FF	FR	FR YDS	INT	IR YDS	AVG IR	LNG	TD	PD
2006	DET	16	125	82	43	0.5	1	1	0	0	0	0	0	0	1
2007	DET	16	134	97	37	1.0	3	0	0	1	5	5	5	0	2
2008	DET	16	113	71	42	1.0	0	0	0	0	0	0	0	0	1
2009	DET	11	49	32	17	0.0	0	1	0	0	0	0	0	0	1
2010	PHI	15	55	48	7	2.0	1	1	0	0	0	0	0	0	5
2011	IND	13	61	32	29	0.0	0	0	0	0	0	0	0	0	1
2012	DAL	10	44	27	17	1.0	0	0	0	0	0	0	0	0	1
2013	DAL	12	42	31	11	0.0	1	0	0	0	0	0	0	0	0
Career		109	623	420	203	5.5	6	3	0	1	5	5	5	0	12

== Personal life ==
On May 29, 2009, Sims married Brooke McGriff, who is pursuing a degree in education at Tallahassee Community College.

Sims' mother, Alice Sims, formerly Alice Bennett, was an All-American sprinter on the Florida State track and field team from 1980 through 1983. His younger brother, Marcus Sims, a highly regarded high school running back, announced in February 2006 that he will also play his college football at Florida State before transferring to the University of North Alabama . His father Ernie Sr. was also a running back at Florida State.

Sims owns a small collection of animals: 5 dogs and 1 type of reptile. Fox produced a segment for the Lions' game against the Minnesota Vikings in Detroit in 2007 which showcased his pets.

Sims currently resides in his home town of Tallahassee, FL, where he owns his own athletic training facility, called Ernie Sims' Big Hits Performance. He also has his own local sports talk radio show.
