= 2004 MPC Computers Bowl =

Virginia Cavaliers	Fresno State Bulldogs
(8–3)	(8–3)
ACC	WAC
34	37
Head coach: Al Groh	Head coach: Pat Hill
AP / Coaches / BCS; 18 / 18 / 18
	1	2	3	4	OT	Total
Virginia	14	7	3	7	3	34
Fresno State	7	3	7	14	6	37
- Date: December 27, 2004
- Season: 2004
- Stadium: Bronco Stadium
- Location: Boise, Idaho
- MVP: Paul Pinegar; Marques Hagans
- Referee: Jay Stricherz (Pac-10)
- Attendance: 28,516

United States TV coverage
- Network: ESPN2
- Announcers: Pam Ward (Play-by-Play); Mike Tomczak (Analyst); Heather Cox (Sidelines)

The 2004 MPC Computers Bowl was a post-season college football bowl game between the Fresno State Bulldogs and the Virginia Cavaliers on December 27, 2004, at Bronco Stadium in Boise, Idaho. Fresno State won the game 37–34 in overtime on a 25-yard touchdown pass from quarterback Paul Pinegar to Stephen Spach.

Virginia had a complicated route to the MPC Computers bowl. Strong hopes based on a 5–0 start and a #6 ranking were dashed by a 36–3 blowout loss to Florida State and a third-place finish in the ACC. The Champs Sports Bowl typically took the fourth-place bowl eligible ACC team, but Virginia declined the bid as the game (played on December 21) would have conflicted with final exams. For a time the Independence Bowl was a possibility, as the Southeastern Conference (SEC) failed to produce enough bowl-eligible teams, but this was contingent on the MPC Computers Bowl getting a Big East school—either Boston College, Connecticut or Syracuse—to replace an ACC team. The MPC Computers bowl normally had the sixth choice of ACC teams, which would have been Georgia Tech or Clemson. Clemson declined all bowl invitations after a season-ending brawl, while Georgia Tech took Virginia's place at the Champs Sports Bowl. The Big East declined to send a team to the MPC Computers Bowl, so on December 1 Virginia accepted the bid.

Fresno State accepted a bid on December 1 as well, after finishing third in the Western Athletic Conference. It was Fresno State's sixth straight bowl game and its first one outside of California since the 1999 Las Vegas Bowl. Virginia and Fresno State had never played each other before.
