= Kamerion Wimbley =

American football player (born 1983)

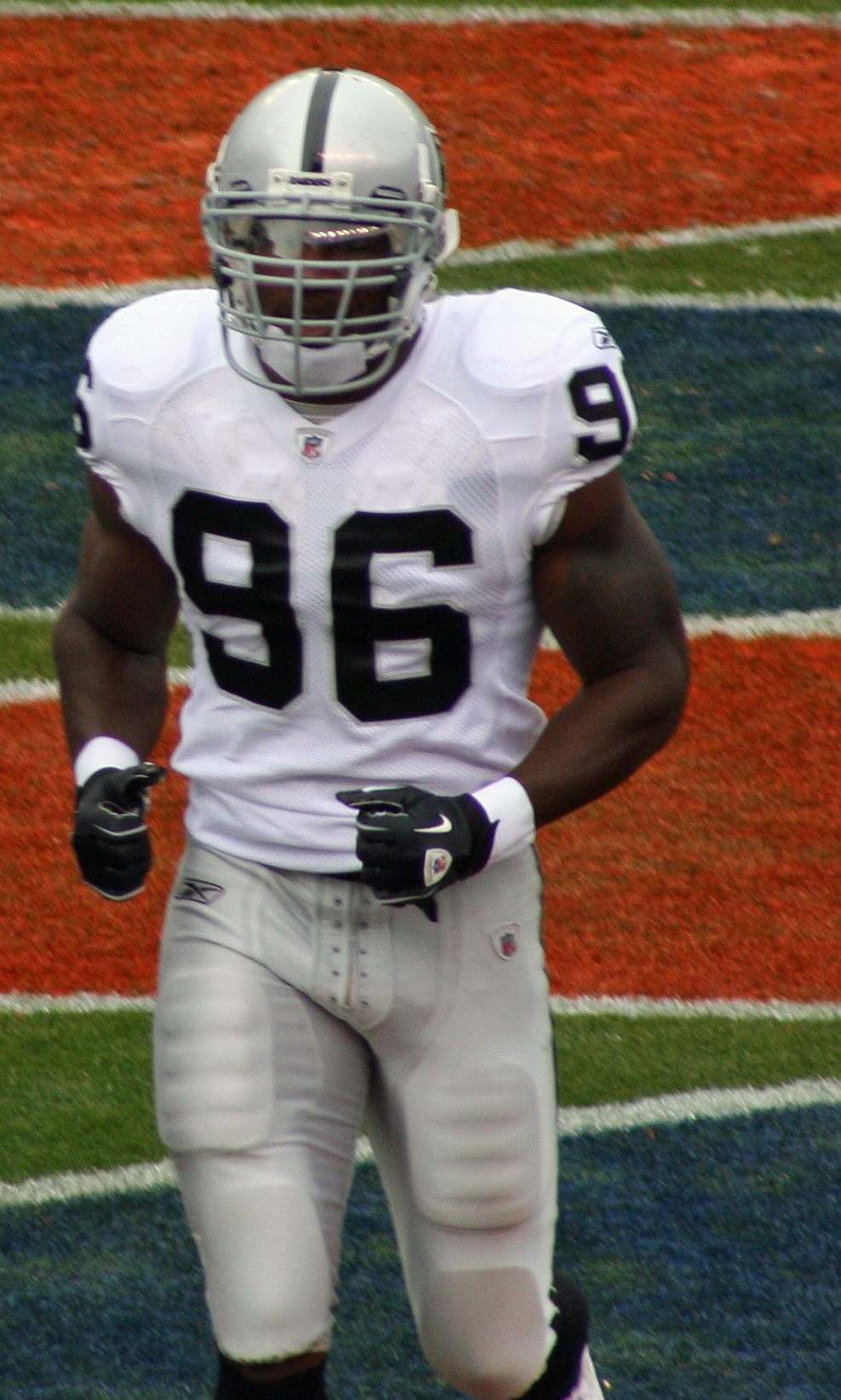
- Wimbley with the Oakland Raiders in 2010

No. 95, 96
- Positions: Linebacker, defensive end

Personal information
- Born: October 13, 1983 (age 43); Wichita, Kansas, U.S.
- Listed height: 6 ft 4 in (1.93 m)
- Listed weight: 258 lb (117 kg)

Career information
- High school: Wichita Northwest
- College: Florida State (2002–2005)
- NFL draft: 2006: 1st round, 13th overall pick

Career history
- Cleveland Browns (2006–2009); Oakland Raiders (2010–2011); Tennessee Titans (2012–2014)

Awards and highlights
- Second-team All-ACC (2005)

Career NFL statistics
- Total tackles: 442
- Sacks: 53.5
- Forced fumbles: 9
- Fumble recoveries: 3
- Interceptions: 2
- Stats at Pro Football Reference

Kamerion Wimbley (born October 13, 1983) is an American former professional football player who was a linebacker and defensive end in the National Football League (NFL). He was selected by the Cleveland Browns in the first round of the 2006 NFL draft with the 13th overall pick. He also played for the Oakland Raiders and Tennessee Titans before retiring in 2015. He played college football at Florida State University.

== Early life ==
Attending Wichita Northwest High School in Kansas, Wimbley played defensive end, linebacker, quarterback, receiver and punter. He earned Parade and SuperPrep All-America honors during his senior season and was considered to be one of the top high school athletes in the nation. He played in the 2002 U.S. Army All-American Bowl.

Considered a four-star recruit by Rivals.com, Wimbley was ranked 58th overall among football prospects of the class of 2002. He selected Florida State over Notre Dame, Nebraska, Oklahoma and Tennessee. Wimbley graduated from Northwest High School in December 2001 (a semester early) and enrolled at Florida State in the spring of 2002.

== College career ==
At Florida State, Wimbley played in all 14 games including the 2003 Sugar Bowl against Georgia as a true freshman, lining up at defensive end while also earning extensive playing time on special teams throughout the season. Wimbley finished the season as the second leading tackler among all Seminole freshmen with 17 stops, behind only A. J. Nicholson. In the Seminoles win at Georgia Tech in early November, Wimbley recorded six solo tackles.

In his sophomore year, Wimbley was still primarily serving as back-up to Eric Moore. Playing in all 13 games, he recorded 38 tackles (30 solo and eight assisted), 6.5 tackles for lost yardage, 2.5 quarterback sacks, two pass break-ups and seven quarterback hurries. His first career start came against Duke, as he replaced the injured Moore and responded with a career-high tying eight tackles. Wimbley's best game of the season came against Colorado with a career-high eight tackles (four for lost yardage), two sacks, two third down stops, two pass deflections and one forced fumble.

Still only a back-up to Moore at right defensive, Wimbley played in all 12 games as a junior. Only against Syracuse and Virginia he replaced Moore in the starting line-up. Wimbley finished the season with 27 tackles and 7 quarterback hurries. Five of those came in the victory over Wake Forest. He also had a season-high five tackles in Florida State's victory over Clemson.

As a senior, he recorded three multiple sack games and lead the ACC in sacks before suffering a knee injury against NC State. He also led the team in quarterback hurries with 17 and set career-highs in season sacks and tackles for a loss. He returned to the starting lineup for the Orange Bowl against Penn State, his last career game. Despite being injured part of the season, Wimbley was named second-team All-ACC and was named All-America by Pro Football Weekly.

== Professional career ==
=== 2006 NFL draft ===
Although playing 4-3 defensive end at Florida State, Wimbley was considered "not big enough to play there on a consistent basis in the NFL." Rather, he was considered an ideal fit at 3-4 rush linebacker by most NFL scouts.

For their 3-4 defense, the Cleveland Browns were in need of a run-stuffer and a pass rusher. There was discussion that the team should pick nose tackle Haloti Ngata, but according to general manager Phil Savage, the coaching staff wanted to pressure the quarterback, so the team targeted Wimbley. The Browns selected him in the first round as the 13th pick overall in the 2006 NFL Draft.

Pre-draft measurables
Height	Weight	Arm length	Hand span	40-yard dash	10-yard split	20-yard split	20-yard shuttle	Three-cone drill	Vertical jump	Broad jump	Bench press
6 ft 3 7/8 in (1.93 m)	248 lb (112 kg)	33 3/4 in (0.86 m)	10 5/8 in (0.27 m)	4.65 s	1.58 s	2.71 s	4.22 s	6.97 s	38.5 in (0.98 m)	10 ft 9 in (3.28 m)	24 reps
All values from NFL Combine/Pro Day

=== Cleveland Browns ===
On July 22, 2006, he signed a six-year deal with the Cleveland Browns and includes $9.3 million in guaranteed money and $23.7 million total. After being converted to outside linebacker from his college position of defensive end, he played the entire season as the starting linebacker playing opposite all-time post season sack leader Willie McGinest. During his rookie season, Wimbley made an immediate impact leading the team and all AFC rookies with 11 sacks, to go along with 62 tackles, 1 fumble recovery, and 1 forced fumble. He managed to fly under the radar in his rookie season despite the impressive performance, who was beaten out by 3 other rookie linebackers in consideration for the NFL Defensive Rookie of the Year award.

In his second NFL season, Wimbley failed to live up to the success of his rookie campaign, being part of a Browns defense that struggled throughout the season. However, he still led the team in sacks with 5, and also registered 51 tackles and 4 forced fumbles.

=== Oakland Raiders ===
On March 14, 2010, Wimbley was traded to the Oakland Raiders for a third round pick that was previously acquired from the New England Patriots in exchange for Derrick Burgess in the 2010 NFL draft, which was used on quarterback Colt McCoy of Texas. The Raiders intended to put him at defensive end, hoping it would bring him back to his 2006 (rookie campaign) form. Instead they moved him to strongside linebacker. On August 21, 2010, during a pre-season game against the Chicago Bears, Wimbley recorded 4 sacks in one half on quarterback Jay Cutler. He finished the 2010 regular season with 58 tackles (46 solo), 9 sacks, a pass defended and a forced fumble. Wimbley started all 16 games in his first season with the Raiders. He was released on March 17, 2012.

=== Tennessee Titans ===
Wimbley signed with the Tennessee Titans on March 20, 2012. The deal was for five years and was worth up to $35 million. During the 2012 season, Wimbley appeared in all 16 games, recording 30 tackles and six sacks as he made the switch to defensive end in the Titans' 4-3 defense. After nine seasons in the NFL, Wimbley announced his retirement from the NFL on May 7, 2015.

=== Career statistics ===
Year	Team	G	Tackles	Sacks	TFL	INT	INT YDS	FF	FR	PD	TD
2006	Browns	16	62	11.0	13	0	0	1	3	0	0
2007	Browns	16	51	5.0	5	0	0	3	0	1	0
2008	Browns	16	66	4.0	7	1	2	1	0	2	0
2009	Browns	15	69	6.5	8	0	0	1	0	1	0
2010	Raiders	16	58	9.0	10	0	0	1	0	1	0
2011	Raiders	16	63	7.0	15	1	73	0	0	3	0
2012	Titans	16	30	6.0	4	0	0	1	1	0	0
2013	Titans	16	11	3.0	4	0	0	0	0	0	0
2014	Titans	13	32	2.0	4	0	0	0	0	0	0
Career		140	442	53.5	71	2	75	8	4	8	0

== Personal life ==
Wimbley owns a Florida-based dog registry called Bull Breed Coalition Registry. It offers more innovative options for a broader population of people to be able to track their dogs' ancestry. Additionally, the BBCR provides education on breeding, training, raising, showing, adopting, and rescuing.

Wimbley competed and won the 2013 Super Bowl Cook-off Competition on the Rachael Ray Show. His competitors were Martellus Bennett and Dwight Freeney. Wimbley had the best recipe as determined by Tony Siragusa. Wimbley created andouille sausage and shrimp over grits, a dish that was well-suited with New Orleans as the Super Bowl host. Wimbley won a large, Super Bowl-style ring.

Wimbley owns several businesses in his hometown of Wichita, Kansas, including a barbershop chain with two locations and a fitness center. He also owned a restaurant called Wings & Things, however, his locations were seized in February 2018 by the Kansas Department of Revenue for owing $82,329.50 in state taxes.

On March 27, 2012, Wimbley participated in G4's American Ninja Warrior South-East Regional Qualifying round. He successfully finished the course with a time of 1:30.87. This time was fast enough to advance him to the Regional Finals. He successfully completed this extended course with a time of 4:25.08. Despite this, his time was not good enough to move on, finishing just one spot off of qualification for the next stage of the competition. He competed again in 2020.

Wimbley appeared on a charity edition of MTV's The Challenge, titled The Challenge: Champs vs. Pros. He competed to raise money for Kamerion Wimbley Foundation, which seeks to raise funding for at-risk youths. He finished as the male runner-up.

=== Charity work ===
Wimbley owns a foundation based in Wichita that helps with the development of character, literacy, and general well-being of the youth and young adults in the area. His foundation also provides training for youth football players in the Wichita area.
