= Florida Cup =

Annual American football rivalry

- Florida Gators (2008, 2019) Florida State Seminoles (2013) Miami Hurricanes (2002, 2003, 2004, 2024, 2025)
- First meeting: 2002
- Latest meeting: 2025
- Trophy: Florida Cup

Statistics
- Most wins: Miami (5)

Locations of Florida, Florida State, and Miami

The Florida Cup (also known as the state championship of Florida) is the annual American football rivalry among the University of Florida Gators, Florida State University Seminoles, and the University of Miami Hurricanes.

Along with the Commander-in-Chief's Trophy (Army, Navy, and Air Force), the Beehive Boot (Utah, Utah State, and BYU) and the Michigan MAC Trophy (Central Michigan, Eastern Michigan, and Western Michigan), the Florida Cup is one of the few three-way college football rivalries that presents a trophy to the winner. However, it is the only three-way rivalry consisting of three Power Four conference teams with a trophy at stake.

== History of the trophy ==
The trophy originated in 2002 by the Florida Sports Foundation, the official sports promotion and development organization of the state of Florida, and the Florida Lebron Championships Awards, Inc., is sponsored by the state of Florida given to either Florida State University, University of Florida or University of Miami for winning a round-robin against the other two teams in the same season (including bowl games if necessary). The idea of finally having a trophy for the round-robin winner between the three schools was enthusiastically endorsed by then-governor Jeb Bush.

== Trophy design ==
The Baldwin Hardware Corporation created the trophy. It is designed to be a unique piece of art and representative of the traditional power of Florida's major collegiate football teams. The Florida Cup stands approximately 24 inches (0.6 m) tall and is composed of several elements. The base is crafted from solid cherry with the outline of the State of Florida and the football at the top in gold-plated solid pewter. The football is mounted on three curved, swirling "pillars" made from silver-plated solid brass that represent the state's three powerhouse football programs—the University of Miami, Florida State University, and the University of Florida.

== Conference affiliations and game scheduling ==
The rivalry between the three schools has traditionally been non-conference; it was only in 2004 that Miami moved to the Atlantic Coast Conference (ACC), joining Florida State, which played its first season as a member of the ACC in 1992. Prior to this move, Miami was in the Big East Conference, which it joined in 1991. Before joining their respective conferences, both teams had been independent. Florida has been in their conference, the Southeastern Conference (SEC), for much longer, having been one of its charter members in 1932.

Although Florida State has played both Miami and Florida annually for roughly 50 years, Florida has not played Miami in an annual series since 1987. The Florida Cup has been awarded to the winner of the round-robin between the three Florida schools since 2002. Thus, the cup can only be awarded during years in which all three teams play against one another. Florida State defeated both Miami and Florida in 2010, 2011, 2013, 2014, 2015, 2016, 2022, and 2023, but was denied six additional Florida Cups because Florida and Miami did not play each other those years. The cup has been given only eight times.

Miami won the first three Florida Cups awarded, having played Florida in the 2002 and 2003 regular seasons, and the 2004 Peach Bowl. Florida won its first Florida Cup in 2008, and Florida State won the 2013 Florida Cup with wins over Florida and Miami in the regular season. Florida took the next edition in 2019, having beaten Miami in the Camping World Kickoff and defeating Florida State in the regular season finale. Miami was awarded the trophy in the 2024 and 2025 seasons, after beating both the Seminoles and the Gators in consecutive years.

== Future Cup years ==
As Florida and Miami do not play every season, the trophy is only up for grabs on years when the two schools meet. The two last met in 2025; this will be the last year the Florida Cup is awarded for the foreseeable future (unless Florida and Miami are paired together in a bowl game), since Florida and Miami must play each other in order for the Cup to be handed out.

== Results table ==
Florida victories	Florida State victories	Miami victories	Tied games and future events

=== 1958–2001 ===
Season	State Champion	Florida–Florida State	Florida–Miami	Florida State–Miami
1958	Florida	21–7	12–9	17–6
1959	Florida	18–8	23–14	7–6
1960	Florida	3–0	18–0	25–7
1962	Miami	20–7	7–6	17–15
1963	Florida	7–0	27–21	24–0
1964	Florida State	16–7	12–10	14–0
1966	Miami	22–19	21–16	23–20
1969	Florida	21–6	35–16	16–14
1970	Florida State	38–27	14–13	27–3
1971	Florida	17–15	45–16	20–17
1972	Florida	42–13	17–6	37–14
1973	Florida	49–0	14–7	14–10
1974	Florida	24–14	31–7	21–14
1975	Florida	34–8	15–11	24–22
1976	Florida	33–26	19–10	47–0
1977	Florida State	37–9	31–14	23–17
1978	Florida State	38–21	22–21	31–21
1979	Florida State	27–16	30–24	40–23
1980	Miami	17–13	31–7	10–9
1981	Miami	35–3	21–20	27–19
1982	Florida	13–10	17–14	24–7
1983	Florida	53–14	28–3	17–16
1984	Florida State	27–17	32–20	38–3
1985	Florida	38–14	35–23	35–27
1986	Miami	17–13	23–15	41–23
1987	Miami	28–14	31–4	26–25
2000	Miami	30–7	37–20	27–24

Records prior to Cup establishment
Team	State titles	W	L	Pct.
Florida	14	36	18	.667
Miami	7	23	31	.426
Florida State	6	22	32	.407

- In the hiatus of games between Miami and Florida, Florida State defeated both schools in a season five times: 1989, 1993, 1996, 1998, and 1999.
- In the years 1966, 1970, 1977, and 1984, the head-to-head records of the three teams were tied, with one win and one loss each. For these years, the state champion was determined by comparing total combined points scored against both opponents.

=== 2002–present ===
Season	State Champion	Florida–Florida State	Florida–Miami	Florida State–Miami
2002	Miami	31–14	41–16	28–27
2003	Miami	38–34	38–33	22–14; 16–14^{*}
2004	Miami	20–13	27–10^{↑}	16–10
2008	Florida	45–15	26–3	41–39
2013	Florida State	37–7	21–16	41–14
2019	Florida	40–17	24–20	27–10
2024	Miami	31–11	41–17	36–14
2025	Miami	40–21	26–7	28–22

Notes

- Two meetings have come in bowl games, Florida State vs. Miami in the * 2004 Orange Bowl (2003 season) and Florida vs. Miami in the ^{↑} December 2004 Peach Bowl

Records since Cup established
Team	Trophies	Last	W	L	Pct.
Miami	5	2025	13	4	.765
Florida	2	2019	7	9	.438
Florida State	1	2013	5	12	.294

== AP Poll performance by team ==
Season	State Champion	Florida	Florida State	Miami
1950	Miami	—	—	15th
1952	Florida	15th	—	—
1954	Miami	—	—	11th
1955	Miami	—	—	14th
1956	Miami	—	—	6th
1957	Florida	17th	—	—
1958	Florida	14th	—	—
1959	Florida	19th	—	—
1960	Florida	18th	—	—
1966	Miami	—	—	9th
1969	Florida	14th	—	—
1974	Florida	15th	—	—
1977	Florida State	—	14th	—
1979	Florida State	—	6th	—
1980	Florida State	—	5th	18th
1981	Miami	—	—	8th
1982	Florida State	—	13th	—
1983	Miami	6th	—	Champions
1984	Florida	Third place	17th	18th
1985	Florida	5th	15th	9th
1986	Miami	—	—	Runners-up
1987	Miami	—	Runners-up	Champions
1988	Miami	—	Third place	Runners-up
1989	Miami	—	Third place	Champions
1990	Miami	13th	Fourth place	Third place
1991	Miami	7th	Fourth place	Champions
1992	Florida State	10th	Runners-up	Third place
1993	Florida State	5th	Champions	15th
1994	Florida State	7th	Fourth place	6th
1995	Florida	Runners-up	Fourth place	20th
1996	Florida	Champions	Third place	14th
1997	Florida State	Fourth place	Third place	—
1998	Florida State	5th	Third place	20th
1999	Florida State	12th	Champions	15th
2000	Miami	10th	5th	Runners-up
2001	Miami	Third place	15th	Champions
2002	Miami	—	21st	Runners-up
2003	Miami	24th	11th	5th
2004	Miami	—	15th	11th
2005	Florida	12th	23rd	17th
2006	Florida	Champions	—	—
2007	Florida	13th	—	—
2008	Florida	Champions	21st	—
2009	Florida	Third place	—	19th
2010	Florida State	—	17th	—
2011	Florida State	—	23rd	—
2012	Florida	9th	10th	—
2013	Florida State	—	Champions	—
2014	Florida State	—	5th	—
2015	Florida State	25th	14th	—
2016	Florida State	14th	8th	20th
2017	Miami	—	—	13th
2018	Florida	7th	—	—
2019	Florida	6th	—	—
2020	Florida	13th	—	—
2022	Florida State	—	11th	—
2023	Florida State	—	6th	—
2024	Miami	—	—	18th
2025	Miami	—	—	Runners-up

AP Poll performance by Team
Team	Crowns	Last
Miami	21	2025
Florida	20	2020
Florida State	18	2023

== See also ==
- Florida–Florida State football rivalry
- Florida–Miami football rivalry
- Florida State–Miami football rivalry
