= 2004 Miami Hurricanes football team =

American college football season

2004 Miami Hurricanes football

Peach Bowl champion Florida Cup champion

Peach Bowl, W 27–10 vs. Florida
- Conference: Atlantic Coast Conference
- Coastal

Ranking
- Coaches: No. 11
- AP: No. 11
- Record: 9–3 (5–3 ACC)
- Head coach: Larry Coker (4th season)
- Offensive coordinator: Dan Werner (1st season)
- Offensive scheme: Pro-style
- Defensive coordinator: Randy Shannon (4th season)
- Base defense: 4–3 Cover 2
- Home stadium: Miami Orange Bowl

2004 Atlantic Coast Conference football standings
	Conf.			Overall
Team	W		L	W		L
No. 10 Virginia Tech $	7	–	1	10	–	3
No. 15 Florida State	6	–	2	9	–	3
No. 11 Miami (FL)	5	–	3	9	–	3
No. 23 Virginia	5	–	3	8	–	4
North Carolina	5	–	3	6	–	6
Georgia Tech	4	–	4	7	–	5
Clemson	4	–	4	6	–	5
NC State	3	–	5	5	–	6
Maryland	3	–	5	5	–	6
Wake Forest	1	–	7	4	–	7
Duke	1	–	7	2	–	9
$ – BCS representative as conference champion; Rankings from AP Poll

The 2004 Miami Hurricanes football team represented the University of Miami during the 2004 NCAA Division I-A football season. It was the Hurricanes' 79th season of football and 1st as a member of the Atlantic Coast Conference. The Hurricanes were led by fourth-year head coach Larry Coker and played their home games at the Orange Bowl. They finished the season 9–3 overall and 5–3 in the ACC to finish in a three-way tie for third place. They were invited to the Peach Bowl where they defeated Florida, 27–10.

== Schedule ==
Date	Time	Opponent	Rank	Site	TV	Result	Attendance
September 10	8:00 pm	No. 4 Florida State	No. 5	Orange Bowl; Miami, FL (rivalry)	ABC	W 16–10 ^{OT}	78,622
September 18	1:00 pm	Louisiana Tech*	No. 4	Orange Bowl; Miami, FL	CSS	W 48–0	53,721
September 23	6:45 pm	at Houston*	No. 4	Reliant Stadium; Houston, TX	ESPN	W 38–13	36,698
October 2	3:30 pm	at Georgia Tech	No. 4	Bobby Dodd Stadium; Atlanta, GA	ABC	W 27–3	55,000
October 14	7:45 pm	No. 18 Louisville*	No. 3	Orange Bowl; Miami, FL (rivalry)	ESPN	W 41–38	63,715
October 23	7:45 pm	at NC State	No. 4	Carter–Finley Stadium; Raleigh, NC (College GameDay)	ESPN	W 45–31	55,600
October 30	7:00 pm	at North Carolina	No. 4	Kenan Memorial Stadium; Chapel Hill, NC	ESPN2	L 28–31	58,000
November 6	7:45 pm	Clemson^{†}	No. 11	Orange Bowl; Miami, FL	ESPN	L 17–24 ^{OT}	55,225
November 13	3:30 pm	at No. 10 Virginia	No. 18	Scott Stadium; Charlottesville, VA	ABC	W 31–21	63,701
November 20	12:00 pm	Wake Forest	No. 12	Orange Bowl; Miami, FL	ESPN	W 52–7	41,315
December 4	1:00 pm	No. 10 Virginia Tech	No. 9	Orange Bowl; Miami, FL (rivalry)	ABC	L 10–16	62,205
December 31	7:30 pm	vs. No. 20 Florida*	No. 14	Georgia Dome; Atlanta, GA (Peach Bowl) (rivalry)	ESPN	W 27–10	69,332
*Non-conference game; ^{†}Homecoming; Rankings from AP Poll released prior to the game; All times are in Eastern time

== Game summaries ==
Notable games such as Rivalry and Ranked Games are listed below:

Miami opened the season ranked #5.

=== Florida State ===
Florida State was ranked #4 heading into the Friday night ABC televised game, Miami ranked #5 won 16 to 10 in Overtime upsetting FSU.

=== Louisville ===
Louisville was ranked #20 heading into the game, Miami ranked #3 won 41 to 38 in the Thursday Night ESPN televised game.

#18 Louisville at #3 Miami (FL)

Team	1	2	3	4	Total
Louisville	7	17	7	7	38
• Miami (FL)	7	0	14	20	41

- Date: October 14
- Location: Orange Bowl
- Game start: 7:30 p.m. EST
- Source: ESPN

Scoring summary
1	5:22	MIA	Greg Olsen 9-yard pass from Brock Berlin (Jon Peattie kick)	MIA 7-0
1	1:53	LOU	Lionel Gates 1-yard run (Arthur Carmody kick)	Tied 7-7
2	14:56	LOU	Arthur Carmody 31-yard field goal	LOU 10-7
2	10:03	LOU	Tiger Jones 12-yard pass from Stefan LeFors (Arthur Carmody kick)	LOU 17-7
2	1:29	LOU	Lionel Gates 17-yard pass from Stefan LeFors (Arthur Carmody kick)	LOU 24-7
3	9:51	MIA	Roscoe Parrish 14-yard pass from Brock Berlin (Jon Peattie kick)	LOU 24-14
3	6:42	LOU	Tiger Jones 22-yard pass from Stefan LeFors (Arthur Carmody kick)	LOU 31-14
3	4:08	MIA	Akieem Jolla 11-yard pass from Brock Berlin (Jon Peattie kick)	LOU 31-21
4	14:53	MIA	Jon Peattie 24-yard field goal	LOU 31-24
4	12:03	MIA	Jon Peattie 32-yard field goal	LOU 31-27
4	8:11	MIA	Devin Hester 78-yard punt return (Jon Peattie kick)	MIA 34-31
4	4:30	LOU	Lionel Gates 1-yard run (Arthur Carmody kick)	LOU 38-34
4	0:49	MIA	Frank Gore 1-yard run (Jon Peattie kick)	MIA 41-38

=== Virginia ===
Virginia was ranked #10 heading into this game, Miami ranked #18 won 31 to 21 in the ABC televised game.

=== Virginia Tech ===
Virginia Tech was ranked #10 heading into this game, Miami ranked #9 lost 10 to 16 in the ABC televised game.

=== Peach Bowl vs Florida ===
Florida was ranked #20 heading into this rivalry game at the Peach Bowl, Miami ranked #14 won 27 to 10. This led to a #11 ranking to close the season.
