= Philip Alexander =

Philip Alexander may refer to:

- Philip Alexander (actor), American actor
- Philip S. Alexander (born 1947), British Judaic scholar
- Phil Alexander (born 1962), English former association footballer and American footballer
- Phillip Alexander (American football), American football defensive end
- Phillip Alexander (politician), Trinidad politician
