= 2004 Continental Tire Bowl =

Boston College Eagles	North Carolina Tar Heels
(8–3)	(6–5)
Big East	ACC
37	24
Head coach: Tom O'Brien	Head coach: John Bunting
AP / Coaches / BCS; 25 / NR / NR
	1	2	3	4	Total
Boston College	14	7	0	16	37
North Carolina	7	14	3	0	24
- Date: December 30, 2004
- Season: 2004
- Stadium: Bank of America Stadium
- Location: Charlotte, North Carolina
- MVP: QB Paul Peterson (Boston College)
- Referee: Bill Athan (WAC)
- Attendance: 73,258

United States TV coverage
- Network: ESPN2
- Announcers: Dave Pasch; Rod Gilmore; Trevor Matich

The 2004 Continental Tire Bowl featured the Boston College Eagles, and the North Carolina Tar Heels. The game was played on Thursday, December 30, 2004, at 1:00 PM EST. The game was the third edition to this bowl game, but the last one under the name Continental Tire Bowl. It would later be renamed the Meineke Car Care Bowl. This edition was particularly notable because Boston College would join the Atlantic Coast Conference, which North Carolina also plays in, the following year.

L. V. Whitworth started the scoring with a 5-yard touchdown run to give Boston College an early 7–0 lead. North Carolina came right back, and quarterback Darian Durant threw a 12-yard touchdown pass to running back Ronnie McGill, to tie the game at 7. Boston College quarterback, Paul Peterson threw a 2-yard touchdown pass to wide receiver Grant Adams to give BC a 14–7 lead at the end of the 1st quarter.

In the second quarter, Darian Durant threw a 5-yard touchdown pass to Wallace Wright to tie the game at 14. He later threw a 51-yard bomb to Derrele Mitchell to give North Carolina a 21–14 lead. Before halftime, Paul Peterson hooked up with David Kashetta on a 1-yard touchdown pass to tie the game at 21.

With four minutes left in the third quarter, North Carolina's Connor Barth hit a 27-yard field goal to give UNC a 24–21 lead. In the fourth quarter, Andre Callender ran 1-yard for a touchdown. The failed extra point gave Boston College a 27–24 lead. Later on, BC kicker Ryan Ohliger ran a fake field goal 21 yards for a touchdown to increase the lead to 34–24. An 18-yard field goal by Ohliger capped the scoring, and BC held on to win 37–24.
