= 2004 Duke Blue Devils football team =

American college football season

2004 Duke Blue Devils football
- Conference: Atlantic Coast Conference
- Record: 2–9 (1–7 ACC)
- Head coach: Ted Roof (1st season)
- Offensive coordinator: Marty Galbraith (1st season)
- Offensive scheme: Pro-style
- Co-defensive coordinators: Scott Brown (1st season); Jerry Azzinaro (1st season)
- Base defense: Multiple 4–3
- MVP: Giuseppe Aguanno
- Captains: Giuseppe Aguanno; Phillip Alexander; Chris Dapolito; Kenneth Stanford
- Home stadium: Wallace Wade Stadium

2004 Atlantic Coast Conference football standings
| | Conf. | | | Overall |
| Team | W | | L | W | | L |
|---|---|---|---|---|---|---|
| No. 10 Virginia Tech $ | 7 | – | 1 | 10 | – | 3 |
| No. 15 Florida State | 6 | – | 2 | 9 | – | 3 |
| No. 11 Miami (FL) | 5 | – | 3 | 9 | – | 3 |
| No. 23 Virginia | 5 | – | 3 | 8 | – | 4 |
| North Carolina | 5 | – | 3 | 6 | – | 6 |
| Georgia Tech | 4 | – | 4 | 7 | – | 5 |
| Clemson | 4 | – | 4 | 6 | – | 5 |
| NC State | 3 | – | 5 | 5 | – | 6 |
| Maryland | 3 | – | 5 | 5 | – | 6 |
| Wake Forest | 1 | – | 7 | 4 | – | 7 |
| Duke | 1 | – | 7 | 2 | – | 9 |
$ – BCS representative as conference champion; Rankings from AP Poll

The 2004 Duke Blue Devils football team represented the Duke University in the 2004 NCAA Division I-A football season. The team was led by head coach Ted Roof. They played their homes games at Wallace Wade Stadium in Durham, North Carolina.

== Schedule ==
| Date | Time | Opponent | Site | TV | Result | Attendance |
|---|---|---|---|---|---|---|
| September 4 | 6:00 pm | at Navy* | Navy–Marine Corps Memorial Stadium; Annapolis, MD | HDNet | L 12–27 | 29,027 |
| September 11 | 12:00 pm | at Connecticut* | Rentschler Field; East Hartford, CT | | L 20–22 | 40,000 |
| September 18 | 12:00 pm | at Virginia Tech | Lane Stadium; Blacksburg, VA | JPS | L 17–41 | 65,115 |
| September 25 | 12:00 pm | No. 23 Maryland | Wallace Wade Stadium; Durham, NC | JPS | L 21–55 | 16,298 |
| October 2 | 2:00 pm | The Citadel*^{†} | Wallace Wade Stadium; Durham, NC | | W 28–10 | 16,814 |
| October 16 | 12:00 pm | at Georgia Tech | Bobby Dodd Stadium; Atlanta, GA (rivalry) | JPS | L 7–24 | 46,856 |
| October 23 | 1:00 pm | No. 14 Virginia | Wallace Wade Stadium; Durham, NC | | L 16–37 | 24,157 |
| October 30 | 12:00 pm | at Wake Forest | Groves Stadium; Winston-Salem, NC (rivalry) | JPS | L 22–24 | 25,762 |
| November 6 | 12:00 pm | at No. 13 Florida State | Doak Campbell Stadium; Tallahassee, FL | PPV | L 7–29 | 80,598 |
| November 13 | 1:00 pm | Clemson | Wallace Wade Stadium; Durham, NC | | W 16–13 | 24,714 |
| November 20 | 12:00 pm | North Carolina | Wallace Wade Stadium; Durham, NC (Victory Bell) | JPS | L 17–40 | 30,541 |
*Non-conference game; ^{†}Homecoming; Rankings from AP Poll released prior to the game; All times are in Eastern time

== Roster ==
2004 Duke Blue Devils football team roster
Players
Coaches
Offense

| Pos. | # | Name | Class |
|---|---|---|---|
| OT | 65 | Christian Mitchell | Jr |
| QB | 7 | Mike Schneider | So |
| QB | 9 | Chris Dapolito | Jr |
| TE | 89 | Andy Roland | Jr |
| TE | 87 | Ben Patrick | So |
| OT | 63 | Jim Moravchik | Jr |

Defense

| Pos. | # | Name | Class |
|---|---|---|---|
| LB | 30 | Brendan Dewan | Jr |
| DT | 90 | Demetrius Warrick | Jr |
| CB | 23 | Brian Greene | Jr |
| LB | 13 | Giuseppe Aguanno | Sr |
| DE | 97 | David Martin | Jr |

Special teams

| Pos. | # | Name | Class |

Head coach

- Ted Roof

Coordinators/assistant coaches

- Jerry Azzinaro
  (Co-defensive coordinator)
- Brad Sherrod
  (Linebackers coach)

Legend

- (C) Team captain
- (S) Suspended
- (I) Ineligible
- Injured
- Redshirt

Roster
Last update: 2019-11-30
