= Jerry Azzinaro =

American football coach (born 1958)

Personal information
- Born: July 11, 1958 (age 68); Brooklyn, New York, U.S.

Career information
- College: American International College

Career history
- American International (1982) Graduate assistant; Westfield State (1985) Linebackers coach, running backs coach; Western New England (1986) Head coach; American International (1987−1991) Defensive coordinator; UMass (1992−1993) Linebackers coach/recruiting coordinator; UMass (1994) Defensive coordinator; Boston College (1995−1996) Defensive line coach; UMass (1997) Defensive coordinator; Maine (1998) Defensive line coach; Syracuse (1999−2003) Defensive line coach, recruiting coordinator; Duke (2004−2006) Co-defensive coordinator; New Hampshire (2007) Defensive line coach; Marshall (2008) Defensive line coach; Oregon (2009−2012) Defensive line coach; Philadelphia Eagles (2013−2015) Assistant head coach, defensive line coach; San Francisco 49ers (2016) Defensive line coach; California (2017) Defensive line coach; UCLA (2018−2021) Defensive coordinator; 2025- University of New England

Head coaching record
- Regular season: 2–7 (.222)

Gerald A. Azzinaro Jr. (/ˌæzɪˈnɛəroʊ/; born July 11, 1958) is an American football coach who most recently served as the defensive coordinator for the UCLA Bruins football team. He played college football as a linebacker at American International College (AIC) and became a graduate assistant for the team in 1982. He was the linebackers and running backs coach for Westfield State in 1985, and he was the head coach for Western New England University in 1986. He was the defensive coordinator for AIC from 1987 to 1991, before becoming the linebackers coach and recruiting coordinator for Massachusetts in 1992. Azzinaro was promoted to defensive coordinator for the Minutemen in 1994, and subsequently moved on to Boston College as the team's defensive line coach in 1995. He was rehired by UMass in 1997 to be their defensive coordinator.

After coaching the defensive line at Maine in 1998, Azzinaro was the defensive line coach and recruiting coordinator for Syracuse from 1999 to 2003. He was the defensive coordinator for Duke from 2004 to 2006. He was the defensive line coach for New Hampshire in 2007 and for Marshall in 2008. He coached the Oregon Ducks' defensive line for four years from 2009 to 2012 before Chip Kelly brought him to coach alongside him while Chip coached the Eagles in 2013. However, in 2016, Azzinaro again followed Chip Kelly, this time to the San Francisco 49ers where Kelly was named head coach, and hired Azzinaro in same role he had in Philadelphia.

== Head coaching record ==
Year	Team	Overall	Conference	Standing	Bowl/playoffs
Western New England Golden Bears (New England Football Conference) (1986)
1986	Western New England	2–7	2–7	9th	
Western New England:		2–7	2–7		
Total:		2–7			
