= Florida–Miami football rivalry =

American college football rivalry

- Florida Gators Miami Hurricanes
- Sport: Football
- First meeting: October 15, 1938; Miami, 19–7
- Latest meeting: September 20, 2025; Miami, 26–7
- Trophy: Florida Cup, and formerly Seminole War Canoe

Statistics
- Total meetings: 58
- All-time series: Miami leads, 31–27 (.534)
- Largest victory: Florida, 46–6 (1940)
- Longest win streak: Florida, 7 (1971–1977)
- Current win streak: Miami, 2

Respective locations of the University of Florida and University of Miami

The Florida–Miami football rivalry is an American college football rivalry between the Florida Gators football team of the University of Florida and Miami Hurricanes football team of the University of Miami. The game was played annually from 1944 until 1987, and is now played intermittently. The winning team was formerly awarded the Seminole War Canoe Trophy. Today, the round robin winner of the three schools in the state of Florida (either the Florida Gators, Florida State Seminoles or Miami Hurricanes) receives the Florida Cup for beating the other two schools in the same season. The two teams last played in the 2025 season. Miami leads the series 31–27.

== Series history ==
The Florida Gators and Miami Hurricanes played an annual "home-and-away" series for almost half a century beginning in 1938 except for 1944 when Florida did not field a team during World War II. The rivalry was once the most important in the state, largely because Miami and Florida are both major college programs and began playing each other a decade before the Florida State Seminoles first took the field.

The 1963 game was only one of 6 games across the country that went ahead and played while all others were canceled due to the assassination of President John F. Kennedy the day before.

The yearly series ended in 1988, when the Southeastern Conference (SEC) increased the number of conference games from six to seven. Florida required six home football games to maintain funding levels for its athletic department, so the school decided to fill out its three game non-conference schedule with two teams that did not require a home-and-home arrangement plus Florida State, ending the series with Miami.

Upon being hired as Florida's head coach in 1990, Steve Spurrier mentioned at his introductory press conference that he wanted to resume the annual series with Miami, and the schools actually signed a contract to play again beginning in 1992. However, the SEC increased the number of conference games to eight and added an SEC Championship Game that year, prompting Florida to cancel the agreement. Given the explanation at the time of cancellation, many Canes fans remain skeptical, accusing the Gators of being afraid of losing, even though at the time, the two teams split the last six games and Miami's only loss in their 1983 national title season was to Florida. During his long tenure at Florida, former athletic director Jeremy Foley reiterated financial concerns as well as SEC expansion as reasons for not renewing the series on an annual basis, though he remained open to playing Miami in occasional neutral-site games.

The Gators and Hurricanes have met on the gridiron eight times since the annual series ended, with Miami holding a 6–2 edge in those contests. Four of those games were part of a regular season home-and-home agreement spread over 11 years and two were in bowl games. The teams' last meeting was featured on College GameDay as the No. 4 ranked Hurricanes defeated the Gators, 26–7 in Miami Gardens. There are no games currently scheduled for the foreseeable future.

The Seminole War Canoe Trophy was hand carved by Seminole Indians from a 200-year-old cypress tree that was struck by lightning. Donated on the behalf of Hollywood, Florida in 1950, it has been an award given to the winner of football games between the schools. The canoe was intended to be a representation of the fighting spirit of the Seminoles. The trophy stopped being passed from school to school in the early 1970s; both schools had trouble displaying the large wooden trophy. After the final game in the "home and home" series in 1987, the Seminole War Canoe Trophy was put on permanent display at the University of Miami Sports Hall of Fame. In 2011, the University of Florida Student Government approved a resolution, which was sent to UM student body president Christina Farmer, ESPN and the head football coaches at each school, requesting the War Canoe's return to UF since they had won the 2008 contest. In response, Brandon Mitchell, president of the University of Miami's Category 5 spirit club, replied: "The War Canoe was intended for the yearly rivalry and . . . Miami won the final game of that yearly rivalry." Miami kept the trophy and it remains at the University of Miami Sports Hall of Fame. The teams share a 19–19 record during the 38-game stretch of the War Canoe Trophy from 1950 to 1987.

Florida won the yearly rivalry series from 1938 to 1987 with 25 wins to Miami's 24. Florida holds the longest win streak with seven consecutive wins. Miami holds a 12–9 advantage at Florida Field and Florida holds a 14–13 advantage at the former Orange Bowl. Florida also holds a 4–3 record on neutral fields at Jacksonville (2), Tampa (1), New Orleans (1), Atlanta (1) and Orlando (2). Of the 58 total meetings, 27 have been decided by a touchdown or less. Florida holds the largest margin of victory with a 46–6 victory on November 16, 1940. Florida and Miami have played each other three times during a combined eight national championship seasons. Florida gave Miami its only loss on the way to Miami's first national championship title on September 3, 1983. Miami beat Florida 31–4 on September 5, 1987, on the way to Miami's second national championship. Florida defeated Miami 26–3 on September 6, 2008, on Florida's way to its third national championship.

== Game results ==
Florida victories	Miami victories	Tie games

No.	Date	Location	Winning team		Losing team	
1	October 15, 1938	Gainesville, FL	Miami	19	Florida	7
2	November 18, 1939	Miami, FL	Florida	13	Miami	0
3	November 16, 1940	Miami, FL	Florida	46	Miami	6
4	November 15, 1941	Miami, FL	Florida	14	Miami	0
5	November 14, 1942	Miami, FL	Miami	12	Florida	0
6	November 3, 1944	Miami, FL	Florida	13	Miami	0
7	October 19, 1945	Miami, FL	Miami	7	Florida	6
8	October 19, 1946	Gainesville, FL	Miami	20	Florida	13
9	November 22, 1947	Miami, FL	Florida	7	Miami	6
10	November 20, 1948	Gainesville, FL	Florida	27	Miami	13
11	November 18, 1949	Miami, FL	Miami	28	Florida	13
12	November 18, 1950	Gainesville, FL	#17 Miami	28	Florida	14
13	November 17, 1951	Miami, FL	Miami	21	Florida	6
14	November 22, 1952	Gainesville, FL	Florida	43	Miami	6
15	November 28, 1953	Miami, FL	Miami	14	Florida	10
16	November 27, 1954	Gainesville, FL	#11 Miami	14	Florida	0
17	November 26, 1955	Miami, FL	#14 Miami	7	Florida	6
18	December 1, 1956	Gainesville, FL	#6 Miami	20	#18 Florida	7
19	November 30, 1957	Miami, FL	#20 Florida	14	Miami	0
20	November 29, 1958	Jacksonville, FL	#14 Florida	12	Miami	9
21	November 28, 1959	Jacksonville, FL	Florida	23	#12 Miami	14
22	November 26, 1960	Miami, FL	#19 Florida	18	Miami	0
23	December 2, 1961	Gainesville, FL	Miami	15	Florida	6
24	December 1, 1962	Miami, FL	Miami	17	Florida	15
25	November 23, 1963	Miami, FL	Florida	27	Miami	21
26	November 28, 1964	Gainesville, FL	Florida	12	Miami	10
27	November 20, 1965	Miami, FL	Miami	16	#10 Florida	13
28	November 26, 1966	Gainesville, FL	Miami	21	#9 Florida	16
29	December 9, 1967	Miami, FL	Miami	20	Florida	13
30	November 30, 1968	Gainesville, FL	Florida	14	Miami	10

No.	Date	Location	Winning team		Losing team	
31	November 29, 1969	Miami, FL	#17 Florida	35	Miami	16
32	November 28, 1970	Gainesville, FL	Miami	14	Florida	13
33	November 27, 1971	Miami, FL	Florida	45	Miami	16
34	December 2, 1972	Gainesville, FL	Florida	17	Miami	6
35	November 24, 1973	Miami, FL	Florida	14	Miami	7
36	November 30, 1974	Gainesville, FL	Florida	31	Miami	7
37	November 29, 1975	Miami, FL	#13 Florida	15	Miami	11
38	November 27, 1976	Orlando, FL	Florida	19	Miami	10
39	November 26, 1977	Miami, FL	Florida	31	Miami	14
40	December 2, 1978	Gainesville, FL	Miami	22	Florida	21
41	December 1, 1979	Miami, FL	Miami	30	Florida	24
42	November 29, 1980	Gainesville, FL	Miami	31	#18 Florida	7
43	September 5, 1981	Miami, FL	Miami	21	#17 Florida	20
44	September 4, 1982	Gainesville, FL	#16 Florida	17	#15 Miami	14
45	September 3, 1983	Gainesville, FL	Florida	28	Miami	3
46	September 1, 1984	Tampa, FL	#10 Miami	32	#17 Florida	20
47	September 7, 1985	Miami, FL	#5 Florida	35	Miami	23
48	September 6, 1986	Gainesville, FL	#3 Miami	23	#13 Florida	15
49	September 5, 1987	Miami, FL	#10 Miami	31	#20 Florida	4
50	January 2, 2001	New Orleans, LA	#2 Miami	37	#7 Florida	20
51	September 7, 2002	Gainesville, FL	#1 Miami	41	#6 Florida	16
52	September 6, 2003	Miami, FL	#3 Miami	38	#21 Florida	33
53	December 31, 2004	Atlanta, GA	#14 Miami	27	#20 Florida	10
54	September 6, 2008	Gainesville, FL	#5 Florida	26	Miami	3
55	September 7, 2013	Miami Gardens, FL	Miami	21	#12 Florida	16
56	August 24, 2019	Orlando, FL	#8 Florida	24	Miami	20
57	August 31, 2024	Gainesville, FL	#19 Miami	41	Florida	17
58	September 20, 2025	Miami Gardens, FL	#4 Miami	26	Florida	7
Series: Miami leads 31–27

=== Results by location ===
As of September 20, 2025

State	City	Games	Florida victories	Miami victories	Years played
Florida	Miami	27	14	13	1939–1987, 2003
Florida	Gainesville	22	9	13	1938, 1946–present
Florida	Orlando	2	2	0	1976, 2019
Florida	Jacksonville	2	2	0	1958–1959
Florida	Tampa	1	0	1	1984
Florida	Miami Gardens	2	0	2	2013, 2025
Georgia	Atlanta	1	0	1	2004
Louisiana	New Orleans	1	0	1	2001

== Notable games ==
=== 1971: The Gator Flop ===
The end of the 1971 game rankled Hurricanes fans for years to come in the series. Florida quarterback John Reaves entered the game looking to break Jim Plunkett's NCAA record for all-time passing yardage in his last regular season game. The Gators led the game throughout, and were up 45–8 when Reaves threw an interception to Miami's defense with little time left in the game and 14 yards separating Reaves from the record. After calling timeouts to prevent the Hurricanes from running out the clock, nearly the entire defense dropped down in unison and allowed Hurricanes back John Hornibrook to score. Dubbed the "Gator Flop", the play allowed the Gators to get the ball back so Reaves could break the record. On the next drive Reaves would find Carlos Alvarez for a 15-yard gain to break the record, and after the game the entire Gators team jumped into the fountain at Miami Orange Bowl that was formerly used for the Miami Dolphins' live mascot. Hurricanes coach Fran Curci refused to shake the hand of Gators coach Doug Dickey after the game for pulling "a bush league stunt", though Dickey denied knowledge the flop was coming.

=== 1980: Why the field goal? ===
Toward the end of the 1980 game, which had turned into a rout, Miami players began celebrating on the sideline. Florida fans responded by pelting them with oranges. Their behavior so incensed Miami coach Howard Schnellenberger, then in his second year, that he called a time out to tack on a 25-yard field goal on the game's final play in a 31–7 victory. "I did that because I wanted the press to come and ask me why I kicked the field goal," Schnellenberger said following the game.

"How are you supposed to like somebody when they're sitting in the stands and you're on the field and they're chucking oranges at you. The crowd was beyond anything that I had ever seen," Miami player Don Bailey said.

=== 1983: Gators defeat eventual national champions ===
Miami entered the 1983 game as a three-and-a-half-point underdog to Florida. The Gators routed Miami 28–3 in Gainesville, to give the Canes their only loss during their 1983 national championship season.

=== 1984: Game One of ESPN's 1st CFB Telecasts ===
The 1984 game at Tampa Stadium was televised live by ESPN on its first day broadcasting live college football games. (The first game televised by the network was a Pitt-BYU matchup earlier that day). Trailing 20–19 after a Florida score with 41 seconds remaining in the fourth quarter, Bernie Kosar led the Hurricanes downfield to a touchdown with six seconds left in the game. With the score 26–20, Miami kicked off to the Gators; having only a second on the clock, Florida's last pass was intercepted by Tolbert Bain and returned for another touchdown as time expired, giving Miami a 32–20 victory, and miraculously covering the spread of Canes −6.5 points.

=== 1985: Gators defeat Canes in Orange Bowl ===
Florida entered the game as a rare road favorite in the Orange Bowl, over a young Canes team. The Gators were giving 5.5 points in Las Vegas. The Gators played inspired football in a 35–23 win over Miami on September 7. The Canes did not lose at home again until September 24, 1994 (38–20 to Washington), an NCAA record winning streak of 58 games.

=== 2003: Ex-Gator leads Canes to win ===
Much of the main story line revolved around Hurricanes quarterback Brock Berlin. Berlin, who committed to play for Steve Spurrier as part of Florida's recruiting class in 2000, transferred to Miami in the spring of 2002 after Ron Zook took over as head coach. Berlin stumbled early on and threw two costly interceptions, and Florida capitalized to take a 33–10 lead by midway through the third quarter. Berlin was even booed by the Miami faithful after his poor play. The Gators looked poised to win their first game against the Hurricanes since 1985. However, Berlin rebounded to complete 18 of his next 20 passes with two touchdown passes, setting up four Miami touchdowns in the final quarter and a half. Following the game, Berlin then performed a mocking version of the Gator Chomp to the fans, who vowed revenge. The Hurricanes won 38–33.

=== 2008: Again, why the field goal? ===
In the 2008 renewal of the rivalry, Florida entered the game as a 22-point favorite. But Florida wide receiver Louis Murphy created controversy by suggesting that the University of Florida was "the new U", sparking a firestorm from both teams and their fans. This handed the Canes some bulletin board material heading into the game.

With 25 seconds left on the game clock, and leading 23–3, Florida kicked a fourth-down field goal to make it 26–3 rather than taking a knee and turning the ball over on downs. Many Miami fans still accuse Meyer of kicking the field goal to allow the Gators to beat the 22-point spread. In the post-game handshake, Miami's Randy Shannon barely touched his hand to Florida coach Urban Meyer without looking at him.

Shannon did not directly talk about Meyer by name. He also hinted the Gators' trying to score would help Miami recruiting. Florida threw a deep touchdown pass late in the game to try to score, only to be nullified by a Gators' holding penalty. Jonathan Phillips kicked a 29-yard field goal with 25 seconds to play.

"I'll just say this one statement," Shannon said on Sunday. "Sometimes when you do things, and people see what type of person you really are, you turn a lot of people off. Now, whatever you want to get out of that, I won't say it again. But it helped us. It helped us more than you'll ever know."

Meyer did not take any shots back at the Hurricanes' coach.

"It was a great football game," Meyer said. "Why don't we talk about the players that played a great, hard-nosed football game and quit measuring up to worrying about Florida. I learned a long time ago just coach your team and take care of yourself. Special teams, offense and defense occupies all our time. So I'm good, we've got to move on."

== Future games ==
There are no future games scheduled between the two schools.

== See also ==
- List of NCAA college football rivalry games

== Bibliography ==
- 2011 Florida Gators Football Media Guide, University Athletic Association, Gainesville, Florida, pp. 116–125 (2011).
- Carlson, Norm, University of Florida Football Vault: The History of the Florida Gators, Whitman Publishing, LLC, Atlanta, Georgia (2007). ISBN 0-7948-2298-3.
- Golenbock, Peter, Go Gators! An Oral History of Florida's Pursuit of Gridiron Glory, Legends Publishing, LLC, St. Petersburg, Florida (2002). ISBN 0-9650782-1-3.
- Hairston, Jack, Tales from the Gator Swamp: A Collection of the Greatest Gator Stories Ever Told, Sports Publishing, LLC, Champaign, Illinois (2002). ISBN 1-58261-514-4.
- McCarthy, Kevin M., Fightin' Gators: A History of University of Florida Football, Arcadia Publishing, Mount Pleasant, South Carolina (2000). ISBN 978-0-7385-0559-6.
- McEwen, Tom, The Gators: A Story of Florida Football, The Strode Publishers, Huntsville, Alabama (1974). ISBN 0-87397-025-X.
- Nash, Noel, ed., The Gainesville Sun Presents The Greatest Moments in Florida Gators Football, Sports Publishing, Inc., Champaign, Illinois (1998). ISBN 1-57167-196-X.
- Proctor, Samuel, & Wright Langley, Gator History: A Pictorial History of the University of Florida, South Star Publishing Company, Gainesville, Florida (1986). ISBN 0-938637-00-2.
