= 2004 NC State Wolfpack football team =

American college football team season

2004 NC State Wolfpack football
- Conference: Atlantic Coast Conference
- Record: 5–6 (3–5 ACC)
- Head coach: Chuck Amato (5th season)
- Offensive coordinator: Noel Mazzone (2nd season)
- Defensive coordinator: Reggie Herring (1st season)
- Home stadium: Carter–Finley Stadium

2004 Atlantic Coast Conference football standings
	Conf.			Overall
Team	W		L	W		L
No. 10 Virginia Tech $	7	–	1	10	–	3
No. 15 Florida State	6	–	2	9	–	3
No. 11 Miami (FL)	5	–	3	9	–	3
No. 23 Virginia	5	–	3	8	–	4
North Carolina	5	–	3	6	–	6
Georgia Tech	4	–	4	7	–	5
Clemson	4	–	4	6	–	5
NC State	3	–	5	5	–	6
Maryland	3	–	5	5	–	6
Wake Forest	1	–	7	4	–	7
Duke	1	–	7	2	–	9
$ – BCS representative as conference champion; Rankings from AP Poll

The 2004 NC State Wolfpack football team represented North Carolina State University during the 2004 NCAA Division I-A football season. The team's head coach was Chuck Amato. N.C. State has been a member of the Atlantic Coast Conference (ACC) since the league's inception in 1953. The Wolfpack played its home games in 2004 at Carter–Finley Stadium in Raleigh, North Carolina, which has been NC State football's home stadium since 1966.

== Schedule ==
Date	Time	Opponent	Rank	Site	TV	Result	Attendance	Source
September 4	6:00 pm	Richmond*		Carter–Finley Stadium; Raleigh, NC		W 42–0	55,600	
September 18	3:30 pm	No. 7 Ohio State*		Carter–Finley Stadium; Raleigh, NC	ABC	L 14–22	56,800	
September 25	12:00 pm	at Virginia Tech		Lane Stadium; Blacksburg, VA	ESPN	W 17–16	65,115	
October 2	12:00 pm	Wake Forest		Carter–Finley Stadium; Raleigh, NC (rivalry)	JPS	W 27–21 ^{OT}	55,600	
October 9	6:00 pm	at North Carolina	No. 25	Kenan Memorial Stadium; Chapel Hill, NC (rivalry)		L 24–30	60,000	
October 16	3:30 pm	at Maryland		Byrd Stadium; College Park, MD	ABC	W 13–3	52,179	
October 23	8:00 pm	No. 3 Miami (FL)^{†}		Carter–Finley Stadium; Raleigh, NC (College GameDay)	ESPN	L 31–45	55,600	
October 30	12:00 pm	Clemson		Memorial Stadium; Clemson, SC (Textile Bowl)	ESPN2	L 20–26	77,399	
November 6	12:00 pm	Georgia Tech		Carter–Finley Stadium; Raleigh, NC	JPS	L 14–24	56,800	
November 11	7:30 pm	No. 12 Florida State		Carter–Finley Stadium; Raleigh, NC	ESPN	L 10–17	56,800	
November 27	1:00 pm	vs. East Carolina*		Bank of America Stadium; Charlotte, NC (rivalry)		W 52–14	41,244	
*Non-conference game; ^{†}Homecoming; Rankings from Coaches' Poll released prior to the game; All times are in Eastern time

== Roster ==
2004 NC State Wolfpack football team roster
Players			Coaches
Offense: Pos. / # / Name / Class; RB / 44 / T. A. McLendon / Jr	Defense: Pos. / # / Name / Class; LB / 91 / Manny Lawson / Jr	Special teams: Pos. / # / Name / Class	Head coach: Chuck Amato; Coordinators/assistant coaches Legend: (C) Team captain; (S) Suspended; (I) Ineligible; Injured; Redshirt
