= 2004 Maryland Terrapins football team =

American college football season

2004 Maryland Terrapins football
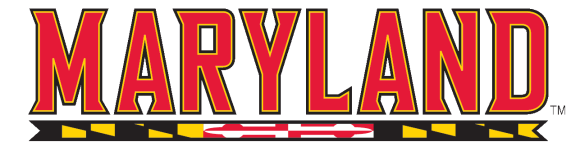
- Conference: Atlantic Coast Conference
- Record: 5–6 (3–5 ACC)
- Head coach: Ralph Friedgen (4th season)
- Offensive coordinator: Charlie Taaffe (4th season)
- Defensive coordinator: Gary Blackney (4th season)
- Home stadium: Byrd Stadium

2004 Atlantic Coast Conference football standings
	Conf.			Overall
Team	W		L	W		L
No. 10 Virginia Tech $	7	–	1	10	–	3
No. 15 Florida State	6	–	2	9	–	3
No. 11 Miami (FL)	5	–	3	9	–	3
No. 23 Virginia	5	–	3	8	–	4
North Carolina	5	–	3	6	–	6
Georgia Tech	4	–	4	7	–	5
Clemson	4	–	4	6	–	5
NC State	3	–	5	5	–	6
Maryland	3	–	5	5	–	6
Wake Forest	1	–	7	4	–	7
Duke	1	–	7	2	–	9
$ – BCS representative as conference champion; Rankings from AP Poll

The 2004 Maryland Terrapins football team represented the University of Maryland in 2004 NCAA Division I FBS football season. It was the Terrapins' 52nd season as a member of the Atlantic Coast Conference (ACC). Ralph Friedgen led the team for his fourth season as head coach. It was his first as a head coach without a bowl game appearance.

== Schedule ==
Date	Time	Opponent	Rank	Site	TV	Result	Attendance
September 4	6:00 pm	Northern Illinois*	No. 22	Byrd Stadium; College Park, MD		W 23–20	51,830
September 11	6:00 pm	Temple*	No. 23	Byrd Stadium; College Park, MD		W 45–22	51,292
September 18	12:00 pm	at No. 7 West Virginia*	No. 21	Milan Puskar Stadium; Morgantown, WV (rivalry)	ESPN2	L 16–19	60,358
September 25	12:00 pm	at Duke	No. 23	Wallace Wade Stadium; Durham, NC	JPS	W 55–21	16,298
October 9	3:30 pm	Georgia Tech	No. 23	Byrd Stadium; College Park, MD	ABC	L 7–20	52,733
October 16	3:30 pm	NC State		Byrd Stadium; College Park, MD	ABC	L 3–13	52,179
October 23	12:00 pm	at Clemson		Memorial Stadium; Clemson, SC	JPS	L 7–10	76,603
October 30	3:30 pm	No. 5 Florida State		Byrd Stadium; College Park, MD	ABC	W 20–17	52,203
November 6	3:30 pm	at No. 13 Virginia		Scott Stadium; Charlottesville, VA (rivalry)	ABC	L 0–16	63,072
November 18	7:30 pm	at No. 15 Virginia Tech		Lane Stadium; Blacksburg, VA	ESPN	L 6–55	65,115
November 27	12:00 pm	Wake Forest		Byrd Stadium; College Park, MD	ESPN	W 13–7	48,226
*Non-conference game; Rankings from AP Poll released prior to the game; All times are in Eastern time

== 2005 NFL draft ==
The following players were selected in the 2005 NFL draft.

Player	Position	Round	Overall	NFL team
Shawne Merriman	Linebacker	1	12	San Diego Chargers
Domonique Foxworth	Defensive back	3	97	Denver Broncos
