= 2004 Virginia Tech Hokies football team =

American college football season

2004 Virginia Tech Hokies football
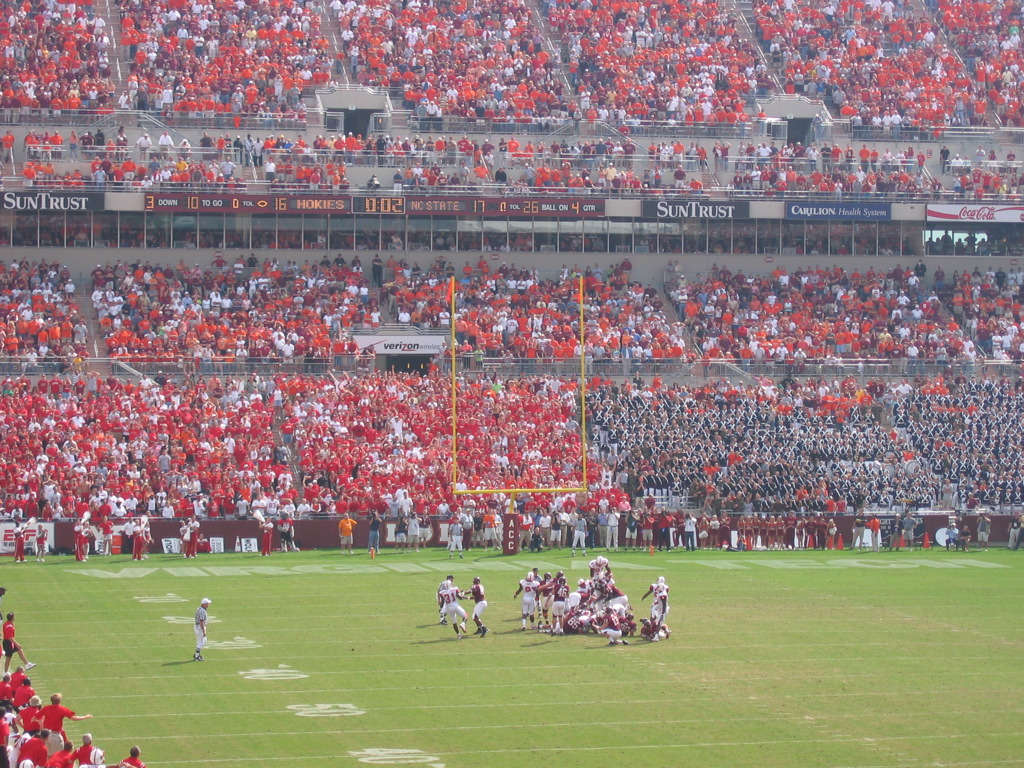

ACC champion

Sugar Bowl, L 13–16 vs. Auburn
- Conference: Atlantic Coast Conference
- Coastal Division

Ranking
- Coaches: No. 10
- AP: No. 10
- Record: 10–3 (7–1 ACC)
- Head coach: Frank Beamer (18th season)
- Offensive coordinator: Bryan Stinespring (3rd season)
- Offensive scheme: Pro-style
- Defensive coordinator: Bud Foster (10th season)
- Base defense: 4–4
- Home stadium: Lane Stadium

2004 Atlantic Coast Conference football standings
	Conf.			Overall
Team	W		L	W		L
No. 10 Virginia Tech $	7	–	1	10	–	3
No. 15 Florida State	6	–	2	9	–	3
No. 11 Miami (FL)	5	–	3	9	–	3
No. 23 Virginia	5	–	3	8	–	4
North Carolina	5	–	3	6	–	6
Georgia Tech	4	–	4	7	–	5
Clemson	4	–	4	6	–	5
NC State	3	–	5	5	–	6
Maryland	3	–	5	5	–	6
Wake Forest	1	–	7	4	–	7
Duke	1	–	7	2	–	9
$ – BCS representative as conference champion; Rankings from AP Poll

The 2004 Virginia Tech Hokies football team represented the Virginia Tech in the 2004 NCAA Division I-A football season. Virginia Tech won the Atlantic Coast Conference championship in its inaugural year in the conference, running off a streak of eight straight wins to end the regular season after a 2–2 start. Tech posted a 10–3 record and finished 10th in the final Associated Press after losing to undefeated Auburn in the Sugar Bowl. The team's head coach was Frank Beamer, who was named ACC Coach of the Year. Tech was led on the field by quarterback Bryan Randall, who was named ACC player of the year.

Virginia Tech began the season unranked nationally, and picked sixth in the ACC's preseason poll, having lost five of its last seven games the previous season. The Hokies faced a daunting schedule, beginning with a nationally televised game against the defending national co-champion USC Trojans. That game, known as the BCA Classic, was the first NCAA college football game of the year, and would be followed by a tough conference schedule.

== Schedule ==
Date	Time	Opponent	Rank	Site	TV	Result	Attendance	Source
August 28	7:40 p.m.	vs. No. 1 USC*		FedExField; Landover, MD (BCA Classic)	ESPN	L 13–24	91,665	
September 11	1:00 p.m.	Western Michigan*		Lane Stadium; Blacksburg, VA		W 63–0	65,115	
September 18	12:00 p.m.	Duke		Lane Stadium; Blacksburg, VA	JPS	W 41–17	65,115	
September 25	12:00 p.m.	NC State		Lane Stadium; Blacksburg, VA	ESPN	L 16–17	65,115	
October 2	12:00 p.m.	No. 6 West Virginia*		Lane Stadium; Blacksburg, VA (rivalry)	ESPN	W 19–13	65,115	
October 9	12:00 p.m.	at Wake Forest		Groves Stadium; Winston-Salem, NC	JPS	W 17–10	32,433	
October 16	1:00 p.m.	Florida A&M*		Lane Stadium; Blacksburg, VA		W 62–0	65,115	
October 28	7:30 p.m.	at Georgia Tech	No. 22	Bobby Dodd Stadium; Atlanta, GA (rivalry)	ESPN	W 34–20	48,398	
November 6	12:00 p.m.	at North Carolina	No. 18	Kenan Memorial Stadium; Chapel Hill, NC	ESPN2	W 27–24	58,000	
November 18	7:30 p.m.	Maryland	No. 15	Lane Stadium; Blacksburg, VA	ESPN	W 55–6	65,115	
November 27	1:00 p.m.	No. 16 Virginia	No. 11	Lane Stadium; Blacksburg, VA (rivalry)	ABC	W 24–10	65,115	
December 4	1:00 p.m.	at No. 9 Miami (FL)	No. 10	Miami Orange Bowl; Miami, FL (rivalry)	ABC	W 16–10	62,205	
January 3, 2005	8:00 pm	vs. No. 3 Auburn*	No. 9	Louisiana Superdome; New Orleans, LA (Sugar Bowl)	ABC	L 13–16	77,349	
*Non-conference game; Rankings from AP Poll released prior to the game; All times are in Eastern time

== Rankings ==
Ranking movements Legend: ██ Increase in ranking ██ Decrease in ranking — = Not ranked
	Week															
Poll	Pre	1	2	3	4	5	6	7	8	9	10	11	12	13	14	Final
AP	—	—	—	—	—	—	—	23	22	18	16	15	11	10	9	10
Coaches	—	—	—	—	—	—	—	22	22	18	16	15	11	11	9	10
BCS	Not released							25	22	20	18	15	14	12	8	Not released

== ACC membership ==
Virginia Tech had been spurned by the original seven ACC members in May 1953 when the charter schools broke off from the Southern Conference. The University of Virginia, which had left the Southern Conference in the 1930s, was added to the original seven in October 1953. In December of that year, a proposal to invite Virginia Tech and West Virginia, made by the University of North Carolina, was tabled. In 1977, Tech's application to the conference was put forward by UVA, Duke, and Clemson, but rejected.

== BCA Classic ==
Tech lost to eventual BCS National Champion USC at FedExField in Landover, Maryland, 24–13, losing the lead late in the third quarter.

== Regular season ==
After a 63–0 shellacking of Western Michigan, Tech played its first ever ACC game on September 18, against Duke. Tech prevailed 41–17 in Lane Stadium. The Hokies dropped to 2–2 following a 17–16 home loss to NC State, in which the Hokies missed a would-be winning field goal as time expired. The team then needed to win five of its next eight games to extend its eleven season streak of playing in a post-season bowl game.

After reeling off three straight wins, including a 19–13 squeaker over then #7 West Virginia, the Hokies' fortunes looked bleak in the fourth quarter of their game against Georgia Tech in Atlanta on ESPN Thursday night college football. Tech was down 14–0 at one point and trailed 20–12 with 5:28 left in the fourth quarter. Tech racked up 22 unanswered points to complete the comeback against the Yellow Jackets.

Tech would go on to win their remaining regular-season games, including a 24–10 win over then #16 Virginia in Lane Stadium and a 16–10 away victory over then #9 Miami, to clinch the ACC Championship. As ACC champions, Virginia Tech was awarded a bid to the 2005 Sugar Bowl, a Bowl Championship Series game in New Orleans, Louisiana. Virginia Tech faced Auburn, a team that had gone undefeated in the regular season but was denied a bid to the national championship game by virtue of its lower rank in the BCS poll. In a game that was not decided until the final two minutes, Virginia Tech lost to Auburn 16–13.

=== Virginia Tech defense ===
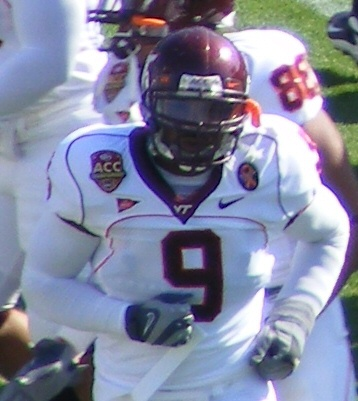
Linebacker Vince Hall was one of the stars of the Virginia Tech defense.

At the conclusion of the regular season, Virginia Tech's defense was ranked third nationally in scoring defense (12.6 points allowed per game), fourth in total defense (269.5 total yards allowed per game) and fifth in pass defense (149.8 passing yards allowed per game). The Tech defense featured two highly regarded cornerbacks, Jimmy Williams and Eric Green, who finished the regular season with 50 tackles and 31 tackles, respectively. Williams also had four interceptions (the most on the team), including one returned for a touchdown, and was named first-team All-ACC. Green, meanwhile, had one interception. Auburn wide receiver Courtney Taylor praised the two players highly in an interview before the game, saying, "Those cornerbacks are amazing to me every time I look at them. I think, 'God, those guys are very athletic.' We're going to have our hands full."

Linebacker Mikal Baaqee was first on the team in tackles, recording 63 during the regular season. Fellow linebacker Vince Hall ranked second, with 62.

On the defensive line, defensive tackle Jonathan Lewis was considered a key player. Though limited by a cast protecting a broken pinky finger suffered during Virginia Tech's game against Virginia, Lewis was expected to continue to perform well. Heading into the Sugar Bowl, Lewis had 38 tackles, including 10 tackles for loss and four sacks. Also on the defensive line was Darryl Tapp, who led the team in sacks, tackles for loss, and quarterback hurries. Tapp earned first-team All-ACC honors and had 55 tackles and one interception during the regular season.

=== Virginia Tech offense ===
Heading into the Sugar Bowl, the Virginia Tech offense was led by quarterback Bryan Randall, who completed 149 of 268 passes (55.6 percent) for 1,965 yards, 19 touchdowns, and seven interceptions. He also rushed for 466 yards and held Tech career records for total offense and passing yards. His 37 consecutive starts also are a school mark for a quarterback. In the preseason, Randall competed for the first-string quarterback spot with Marcus Vick until the latter was suspended from Tech for a semester after a criminal conviction. In the weeks leading up to the Sugar Bowl, Randall was named the Virginia Division I Offensive Player of the Year by the Roanoke Times and was named the ACC Player of the Year.

Tech's rushing offense featured two running backs who shared time on the field: Mike Imoh and Cedric Humes. During the regular season, Imoh rushed the ball 152 times for 704 yards, an average of 4.6 yards per carry. He scored four touchdowns and set a school record for rushing yards in a game when he ran for 243 yards in Virginia Tech's game against North Carolina. Humes was on the field slightly less than Imoh, but earned 595 yards and five touchdowns on 124 carries. Tech offensive tackle Jimmy Martin was expected to play in the game after recovering from a high ankle sprain.

On special teams, Tech's Jim Davis blocked three field goals during the regular season, and teammate Darryl Tapp blocked a punt. Tech's success on special teams was at least partially due to head coach Frank Beamer's emphasis on that aspect of the game, a strategy known as "Beamerball." Due to Tech's acumen on special teams, Auburn was forced to spend extra time in preparing its special teams to face Virginia Tech in the Sugar Bowl.

The Sugar Bowl was a homecoming for Tech punter Vinnie Burns, who played high school football 15 miles (24 km) from the Louisiana Superdome, site of the Sugar Bowl. In addition, Burns' father, Ronnie Burns, was a longtime Sugar Bowl committee member, and Vinnie committed to attend Virginia Tech while the Hokies were in New Orleans to play in the 2000 Sugar Bowl, that year's national championship game.

== Personnel ==
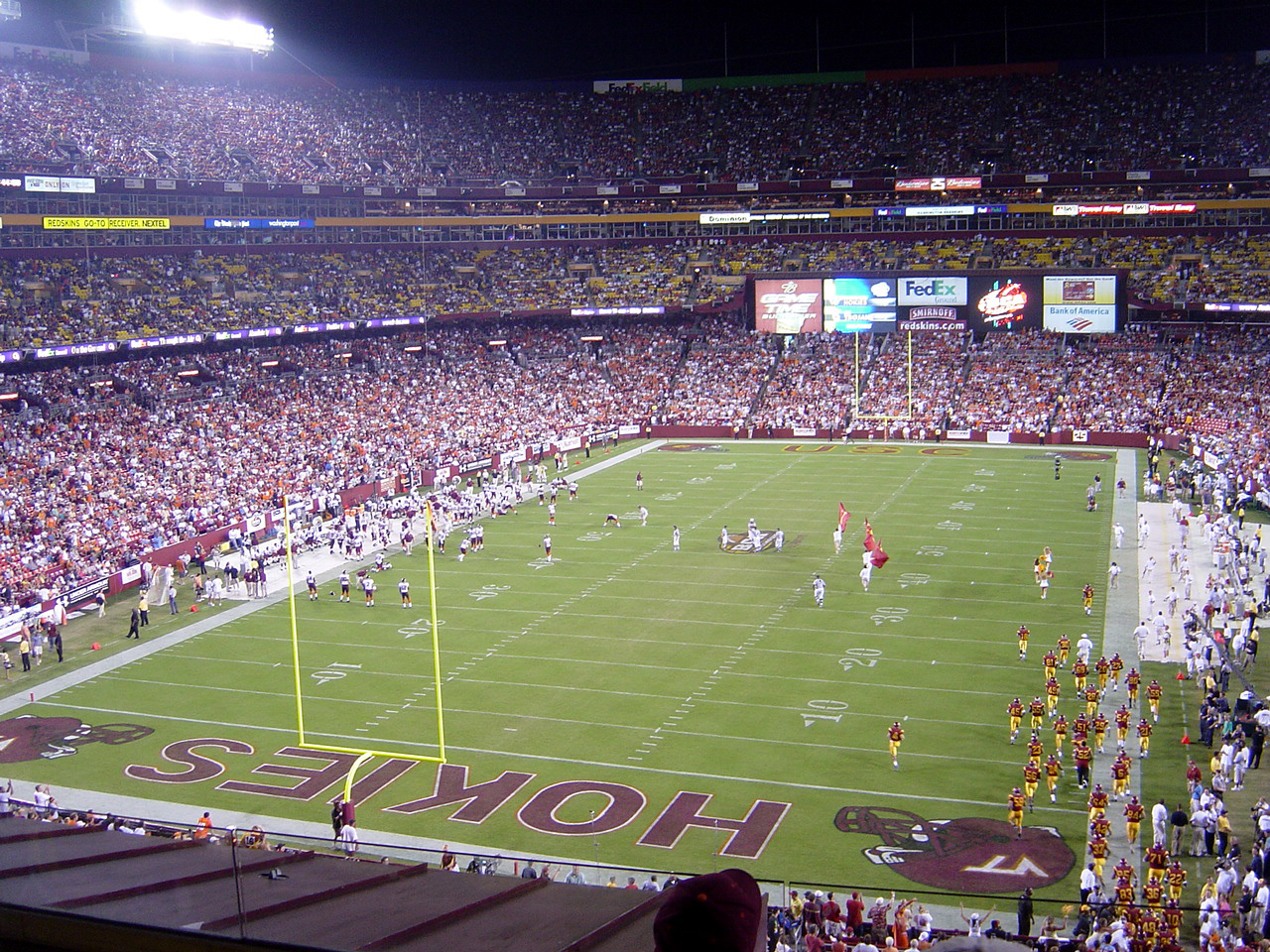
The Hokies take on USC in the BCA Classic.

=== Coaching staff ===
Position	Name	First year at VT	First year in current position
Head coach	Frank Beamer	1987	1987
Associate head coach and running backs coach	Billy Hite	1978	2001
Offensive coordinator and offensive line	Bryan Stinespring	1990	2002
Defensive coordinator and inside linebackers	Bud Foster	1987	1995
Wide receivers	Tony Ball	1998	1998
Strong safety, Outside linebackers, and Recruiting Coordinator	Jim Cavanaugh	1996	2002
Quarterbacks	Kevin Rogers	2002	2002
Tight ends and Offensive tackles	Danny Pearman	1998	1998
Defensive backs	Lorenzo Ward	1999	1999
Defensive line	Charley Wiles	1996	1996

=== Roster ===
Quarterback: **3 Bryan Randall** – Senior; 7 Sean Glennon – Freshman; 13 Lance Goff – RS Senior; 14 Cory Holt – (redshirt) Freshman; Tailback: Brandon Ore – (redshirt) Freshman; **20 Mike Imoh** – Junior; 27 Justin Hamilton – RS Junior; **32 Cedric Humes** – RS Junior; 34 George Bell – (redshirt) Freshman; 44 John Candelas – Junior; Flanker: Justin Born – (redshirt) Freshman; **4 Eddie Royal** – Freshman; 12 Richard Johnson – Senior; 39 Jeremy Gilchrist – (redshirt) Freshman; **87 David Clowney** – Sophomore; Split end: 16 Chris Clifton – RS Junior; 17 Josh Morgan – Freshman; **19 Josh Hyman** – RS Freshman; 41 Chris Albright – Sophomore; 80 Robert Parker – RS Sophomore; 81 Justin Harper – Freshman; 88 Michael Malone – RS Sophomore; Fullback: Billy Gorham – Freshman; Mike Green – Freshman; **43 John Kinzer** – RS Freshman; 37 Jesse Allen – RS Sophomore; 39 Carlton Weatherford – RS Freshman; Tight end: ~~83 Maurice Reevey – Freshman~~; ~~83 Matt Roan – RS Freshman~~; **85 Jared Mazzetta** – RS Senior; 89 Duane Brown – RS Freshman; **90 Jeff King** – RS Junior; 92 Andrew Fleck – RS Sophomore	Center: Kevin McGlothlin – Freshman; 57 Tripp Carroll – RS Freshman; 58 Ryan Shuman – (redshirt) Freshman; **66 Will Montgomery** – RS Junior; 69 Danny McGrath – RS Sophomore; Offensive guard: Jared Horton – Freshman; Zac Lowe – Sophomore; John Massie – Freshman; 50 Mike Parham – RS Sophomore; 51 Matt Welsh – (redshirt) Freshman; **61 Reggie Butler** – Junior; 63 Rashad Ferebee – Junior; **76 James Miller** – Senior; **72 Jason Murphy** – RS Junior; 77 Brandon Gore – RS Sophomore; Offensive tackle: Mason Baggett – RS Sophomore; **52 Jimmy Martin** – Junior; 67 Nick Marshman – (redshirt) Freshman; 74 Brandon Frye – RS Sophomore; **79 Jon Dunn** – RS Senior; Defensive tackle: Scott King – Freshman; **56 Jonathan Lewis** – Junior; 59 Barry Booker – RS Freshman; 60 Chris Burnett – RS Sophomore; 70 Kevin Lewis – RS Senior; 71 Tim Sandidge – RS Junior; 75 Kory Robertson – RS Freshman; ~~86 Isaac Montgomery – RS Senior~~; 91 Jason Lallis – RS Senior; **95 Jim Davis** – RS Senior; 99 Carlton Powell – RS Freshman; Defensive end: Greg Kezmarsky – Junior; David Martin – Freshman; Watson Stelly – Freshman; 41 Jordan Trott – RS Junior; 49 Chris Ellis – RS Freshman; 54 Bob Ruff – Senior; **55 Darryl Tapp** – Junior; 91 Jason Lallis – RS Senior; **96 Noland Burchette** – RS Sophomore	Linebacker: D.J. Preston – Freshman; 6 Andrew Bowman – (redshirt) Freshman; **9 Vince Hall** – RS Freshman; 11 Xavier Adibi – RS Freshman; 33 Chad Cooper – Senior; 35 Stevie Ray Lloyd – RS Freshman; 36 Aaron Rouse – RS Sophomore; 40 Blake Warren – RS Junior; **42 James Anderson** – RS Junior; **45 Mikal Baaqee** – RS Senior; 47 Brett Warren – Freshman; 48 Brandon Manning – RS Senior; 86 Chad Grimm – Sophomore; Free safety: **8 Vincent Fuller** – RS Senior; 28 Corey Gordon – RS Freshman; 31 Mike Daniels – RS Senior; Rover: Derrick Burks – Freshman; Purnell Sturdivant – (redshirt) Freshman; **22 James Griffin** – Senior; 24 D.J. Walton – RS Junior; 26 Kent Hicks – (redshirt) Freshman; 30 Cary Wade – RS Sophomore; 82 Brendan Hill – RS Sophomore; 94 Jake Patten – Sophomore; Cornerback: **1 Eric Green** – RS Senior; **2 Jimmy Williams** – Junior; 15 Roland Minor – RS Freshman; 18 Brandon Flowers – Freshman; 21 Chris Caesar – (redshirt) RS Sophomore; 25 D.J. Parker – Freshman; 26 Ryan Hash – RS Sophomore; 29 Brian McPherson – RS Sophomore; 47 Theodore Miller – (redshirt) Freshman; 97 Cory Price – Sophomore; Snapper: Bart McMillin – RS Freshman; **53 Nick Leeson** – RS Sophomore; 62 Travis Conway – RS Senior; Punter: 23 Nic Schmitt – RS Sophomore; **38 Vinnie Burns** – RS Senior; **Place kicker**: **46 Brandon Pace** – RS Sophomore; 92 Jud Dunlevy – RS Freshman; 98 Jared Develli – Freshman
Starters are in **bold** and players who left the team are ~~struck out~~ (redshirt) Players who sat out during 2004 ("redshirted") are indicated with a "red shirt" icon
