= 2004 North Carolina Tar Heels football team =

American college football season

2004 North Carolina Tar Heels football

Continental Tire Bowl, L 24–37 vs. Boston College
- Conference: Atlantic Coast Conference
- Record: 6–6 (5–3 ACC)
- Head coach: John Bunting (4th season)
- Offensive coordinator: Gary Tranquill (4th season)
- Offensive scheme: Pro-style
- Co-defensive coordinators: John Gutekunst (1st season); Marvin Sanders (1st season)
- Base defense: 4–3
- Captains: Darian Durant; Jason Brown; Gerald Sensabaugh; Jonas Seawright; Greg Warren
- Home stadium: Kenan Memorial Stadium

2004 Atlantic Coast Conference football standings
	Conf.			Overall
Team	W		L	W		L
No. 10 Virginia Tech $	7	–	1	10	–	3
No. 15 Florida State	6	–	2	9	–	3
No. 11 Miami (FL)	5	–	3	9	–	3
No. 23 Virginia	5	–	3	8	–	4
North Carolina	5	–	3	6	–	6
Georgia Tech	4	–	4	7	–	5
Clemson	4	–	4	6	–	5
NC State	3	–	5	5	–	6
Maryland	3	–	5	5	–	6
Wake Forest	1	–	7	4	–	7
Duke	1	–	7	2	–	9
$ – BCS representative as conference champion; Rankings from AP Poll

The 2004 North Carolina Tar Heels football team represented the University of North Carolina at Chapel Hill as a member of the Atlantic Coast Conference (ACC) during the 2004 NCAA Division I-A football season. Led by third-year head coach John Bunting, the Tar Heels played their home games at Kenan Memorial Stadium in Chapel Hill, North Carolina. North Carolina finished the season 6–6 overall and 5–3 in ACC play to tie for third place. They lost to Boston College in the Continental Tire Bowl.

== Schedule ==
Date	Time	Opponent	Site	TV	Result	Attendance
September 4	1:30 p.m.	William & Mary*	Kenan Memorial Stadium; Chapel Hill, NC		W 49–38	43,500
September 11	3:30 p.m.	at No. 15 Virginia	Scott Stadium; Charlottesville, VA (South's Oldest Rivalry)	ABC	L 24–56	62,790
September 18	6:00 p.m.	Georgia Tech	Kenan Memorial Stadium; Chapel Hill, NC		W 34–13	46,250
September 25	1:30 p.m.	No. 24 Louisville*	Kenan Memorial Stadium; Chapel Hill, NC		L 0–34	49,000
October 2	12:00 p.m.	at No. 9 Florida State	Doak Campbell Stadium; Tallahassee, FL	ESPN2	L 16–38	82,708
October 9	6:00 p.m.	NC State	Kenan Memorial Stadium; Chapel Hill, NC (rivalry)		W 30–24	60,000
October 16	10:00 p.m.	at No. 11 Utah*	Rice–Eccles Stadium; Salt Lake City, UT		L 16–46	45,319
October 30	7:00 p.m.	No. 4 Miami (FL)^{†}	Kenan Memorial Stadium; Chapel Hill, NC	ESPN2	W 31–28	58,000
November 6	12:00 p.m.	No. 18 Virginia Tech	Kenan Memorial Stadium; Chapel Hill, NC	ESPN2	L 24–27	58,000
November 13	12:00 p.m.	at Wake Forest	Groves Stadium; Winston-Salem, NC (rivalry)	JPS	W 31–24	37,623
November 20	12:00 p.m.	at Duke	Wallace Wade Stadium; Durham, NC (Victory Bell)	JPS	W 40–17	30,541
December 30	1:00 p.m.	vs. No. 25 Boston College*	Bank of America Stadium; Charlotte, NC (Continental Tire Bowl)	ESPN2	L 24–37	73,258
*Non-conference game; ^{†}Homecoming; Rankings from AP Poll released prior to the game; All times are in Eastern time

== Coaching staff ==
Name	Position	Seasons in Position
John Bunting	Head coach	4th
Gunter Brewer	Wide Receivers	5th
Kenny Browning	Tight Ends	11th
Jeff Connors	Strength and conditioning coordinator	4th
John Gutekunst	Defensive coordinator / Linebackers	1st
Hal Hunter	Offensive Line	3rd
Brad Lawing	Defensive Line / recruiting coordinator	2nd
Andre' Powell	Running backs	4th
Marvin Sanders	Defensive coordinator / defensive backs	1st
Gary Tranquill	Offensive coordinator / quarterbacks	4th
James Webster, Jr.	Assistant head coach/ special teams coordinator	4th
Matt House	Defensive Assistant	2nd

== Team statistics ==
Passing Leaders	Cmp	Att	Yds	TD	Int
Darian Durant	178	299	2238	17	9
Matt Baker	23	36	326	1	2

Rushing Leaders	Car	Yds	Long	TD
Chad Scott	143	796	48	8
Jacque Lewis	74	557	53	3
Ronnie McGill	79	419	49	5
Darian Durant	81	188	24	1
Madison Hedgecock	30	118	25	2

Receiving Leaders	Rec	Yds	Long	TD
Jesse Holley	30	456	45	2
Jarwarski Pollock	45	408	38	2
Derrele Mitchell	21	354	51	3
Adarius Bowman	18	329	52	3
Mike Mason	19	272	35	1

Kicking	XPM	XPA	FGM	FGM	Long	Pts
Connor Barth	35	36	14	18	50	77
