= 2004 Georgia Tech Yellow Jackets football team =

American college football season

2004 Georgia Tech Yellow Jackets football

Champs Sports Bowl champion

Champs Sports Bowl, W 51–14 vs. Syracuse
- Conference: Atlantic Coast Conference
- Coastal
- Record: 7–5 (4–4 ACC)
- Head coach: Chan Gailey (3rd season)
- Offensive coordinator: Patrick Nix (3rd season)
- Offensive scheme: Mixed shotgun and ace
- Defensive coordinator: Jon Tenuta (3rd season)
- Base defense: Zone blitz
- Home stadium: Bobby Dodd Stadium

2004 Atlantic Coast Conference football standings
	Conf.			Overall
Team	W		L	W		L
No. 10 Virginia Tech $	7	–	1	10	–	3
No. 15 Florida State	6	–	2	9	–	3
No. 11 Miami (FL)	5	–	3	9	–	3
No. 23 Virginia	5	–	3	8	–	4
North Carolina	5	–	3	6	–	6
Georgia Tech	4	–	4	7	–	5
Clemson	4	–	4	6	–	5
NC State	3	–	5	5	–	6
Maryland	3	–	5	5	–	6
Wake Forest	1	–	7	4	–	7
Duke	1	–	7	2	–	9
$ – BCS representative as conference champion; Rankings from AP Poll

The 2004 Georgia Tech Yellow Jackets football team represented the Georgia Institute of Technology in the 2004 NCAA Division I-A football season. The team's coach was former University of Florida quarterback Chan Gailey. It played its home games at Bobby Dodd Stadium in Atlanta.

== Schedule ==
Date	Time	Opponent	Site	TV	Result	Attendance	Source
September 4	1:00 pm	Samford*	Bobby Dodd Stadium; Atlanta, GA		W 28–7	43,100	
September 11	8:00 pm	at No. 20 Clemson	Memorial Stadium; Clemson, SC	ABC	W 28–24	81,427	
September 18	6:05 pm	at North Carolina	Kenan Stadium; Chapel Hill, NC		L 13–34	46,250	
October 2	3:30 pm	No. 4 Miami (FL)	Bobby Dodd Stadium; Atlanta, GA	ABC	L 3–27	55,000	
October 9	3:30 pm	at No. 23 Maryland	Byrd Stadium; College Park, MD	ABC	W 20–7	52,733	
October 16	12:00 pm	Duke^{†}	Bobby Dodd Stadium; Atlanta, GA	JPS	W 24–7	46,856	
October 28	7:45 pm	No. 22 Virginia Tech	Bobby Dodd Stadium; Atlanta, GA	ESPN	L 20–34	48,398	
November 6	12:00 pm	at NC State	Carter–Finley Stadium; Raleigh, NC	JPS	W 24–14	56,800	
November 13	1:00 pm	Connecticut*	Bobby Dodd Stadium; Atlanta, GA		W 30–10	43,577	
November 20	1:00 pm	No. 18 Virginia	Bobby Dodd Stadium; Atlanta, GA	ABC	L 10–30	43,971	
November 27	3:30 pm	at No. 8 Georgia*	Sanford Stadium; Athens, GA (Clean, Old-Fashioned Hate)	CBS	L 13–19	92,746	
December 21	7:45 pm	vs. Syracuse*	Florida Citrus Bowl; Orlando, FL (Champs Sports Bowl)	ESPN	W 51–14	28,237	
*Non-conference game; ^{†}Homecoming; Rankings from AP Poll released prior to the game; All times are in Eastern time

== Coaching staff ==
- Chan Gailey – Head Coach
- Joe D'Alessandris – Offensive Line
- Buddy Geis – Wide Receivers/Assistant Head Coach
- Brian Jean-Mary – Linebackers
- Curtis Modkins – Running Backs
- Patrick Nix – Offensive Coordinator/Quarterbacks
- Tommie Robinson – Tight Ends
- Giff Smith – Defensive Line
- Jon Tenuta – Defensive Coordinator/Defensive Backs
- David Wilson – Special Teams/Recruiting Coordinator
