= Ron Zook =

American football player and coach (born 1954)

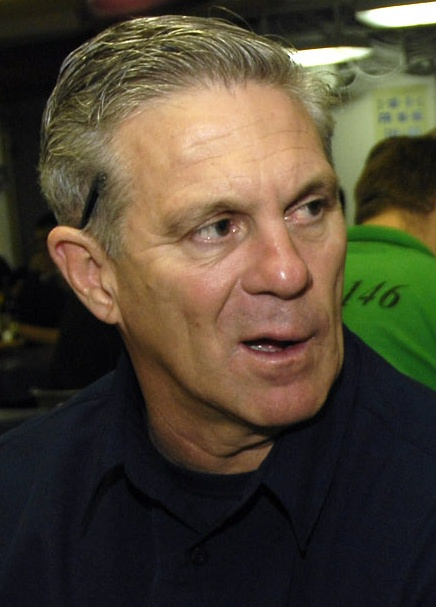
- Zook in 2008

Maryland Terrapins
- Title: Special teams quality control coach

Personal information
- Born: April 28, 1954 (age 72); Ashland, Ohio, U.S.

Career information
- High school: Loudonville
- College: Miami (OH)

Career history
- Orrville HS (OH) (1976–1977) Defensive backs coach; Murray State (1978–1980) Defensive backs coach; Cincinnati (1981–1982) Defensive coordinator; Kansas (1983) Defensive coordinator; Tennessee (1984–1986) Defensive backs coach; Virginia Tech (1987) Associate head coach; Ohio State (1988–1990) Defensive backs coach; Florida (1991–1993) Defensive coordinator & defensive backs coach; Florida (1994) Special teams coordinator; Florida (1995) Associate head coach & special teams coordinator; Pittsburgh Steelers (1996–1998) Special teams coordinator; Kansas City Chiefs (1999) Defensive backs coach; New Orleans Saints (2000–2001) Defensive coordinator; Florida (2002–2004) Head coach; Illinois (2005–2011) Head coach; Green Bay Packers (2014) Special teams assistant; Green Bay Packers (2015–2018) Special teams coordinator; Salt Lake Stallions (2019) Special teams coordinator & secondary coach; Maryland (2019–2020) Senior analyst; Maryland (2021) Associate head coach & special teams coordinator; Seattle Sea Dragons (2023) Defensive coordinator; Maryland (2024–present) Special teams quality control coach

Awards and highlights
- SEC Eastern Division (2003); Big Ten Coach of the Year (2007)

Head coaching record
- Career: NCAA: 57–65 (.467)

Ronald Andrew Zook (/zʊk/; born April 28, 1954) is an American football coach who is a special teams quality control coach at the University of Maryland. He was the head football coach at the University of Florida from 2002 to 2004 and the University of Illinois at Urbana–Champaign from 2005 to 2011.

Zook is a native of Ohio and an alumnus of Miami University, where he played college football. He has worked as an assistant coach in the National Football League (NFL) with the Pittsburgh Steelers (1996–1998), Kansas City Chiefs (1999), and New Orleans Saints (2000–2001). In August 2012, he was hired as a college football studio analyst by CBS Sports. He was also employed as the special teams coach for the Green Bay Packers. In 2019, he was the special teams coordinator and secondary coach for the Salt Lake Stallions of the Alliance of American Football (AAF).

== Early life ==
Ronald Andrew Zook was born in Ashland, Ohio and raised in nearby Loudonville. At Loudonville High School, Zook played basketball, track, and football. Upon graduating, he was offered a track scholarship to Purdue University and received offers to play football at several small colleges in the Midwest. However, Zook wanted to play Division I football, so he decided to walk on at Miami University in Oxford, Ohio. He made the team, and by his senior season, Zook was a starting defensive back and a co-captain for the Miami Redskins. He graduated with a bachelor's degree in comprehensive science in 1976.

== Coaching career ==
=== High school assistant ===
Zook started coaching football immediately upon graduating from college, beginning his career in 1976 as the defensive backs coach at Orrville High School in Orrville, Ohio under head coach Mo Tipton.

=== College assistant ===
In 1978, Zook began his college football coaching career when he became a graduate assistant at Murray State University. Through the 1980s, Zook held coaching positions with a number of college football teams, serving as a defensive coordinator at Cincinnati and Kansas and as a position coach at Tennessee, Virginia Tech, and Ohio State.

Beginning in 1991, Zook served as defensive coordinator for three seasons at the University of Florida under head coach Steve Spurrier. After the 1993 season, Spurrier reassigned Zook to be the special teams coordinator, a move considered by many to be a demotion due to the team's unsatisfactory performance on pass defense. Zook's special teams units performed well enough during the 1994 season that he was offered the defensive coordinator position at Michigan State, prompting Spurrier to give him the title of associate head coach to help keep him at Florida.

Florida defensive coordinator Bobby Pruett left to become the head coach at Marshall University in January 1995 and Zook was promoted to take his place, becoming Florida's defensive coordinator once again. However, the NFL's Pittsburgh Steelers offered Zook the job of special teams coordinator just one month later and he accepted, leaving the college game for a time. With Zook leaving, Bob Stoops was brought in to run Florida's defense.

=== NFL assistant ===
After leaving Florida, Zook served three seasons as special teams coach for the Pittsburgh Steelers, then was the defensive backs coach for the Kansas City Chiefs in 1999. KC finished with a 9–7 record, 16th in passing yards allowed, and James Hasty had seven interceptions and Cris Dishman finished with five interceptions. In the 2000 and 2001 seasons, Zook served as the defensive coordinator for the New Orleans Saints. In 2000, the Saints finished 10–6 with Zook's defense ranking tenth in points allowed. DT La'Roi Glover led the team with 17 Sacks followed by 12 from DE Joe Johnson and 11 by DE Darren Howard.

=== College head coach ===
==== University of Florida ====
In January 2002, Steve Spurrier resigned from Florida to explore head coaching opportunities in the NFL, eventually signing with the Washington Redskins. Florida athletic director Jeremy Foley sought to replace him with either Denver Broncos coach Mike Shanahan or Oklahoma's Bob Stoops, but each decided to remain with their respective teams. Foley's next choice was Zook, who accepted the job. Given the success of Spurrier's 12-year tenure, expectations at Florida were high, and seemingly settling for Zook was not popular with many students and supporters. Others did not understand why the university would hire a man who was demoted as a coordinator on the same staff to be head coach. Within a day of Zook's hiring, one fan started a website called FireRonZook.com that gained national media attention. Many fraternity houses hung banners from week to week either praising Zook or calling for his firing.

Zook was head coach at Florida for three seasons. The Gators compiled records of 8–5 (2002), 8–5 (2003) and 7–5 (2004). While Zook's tenure saw modest success, it was well short of what Gator fans had come to expect. In his three seasons, the Gators lost six games at Ben Hill Griffin Stadium. By comparison, Spurrier lost only five home games in 12 years. Many of the losses were fourth quarter comebacks by the opposition, causing many fans to question the prevent defense that was employed. Zook did not beat a ranked opponent at home during his time at Florida. Zook was fired before the end of the 2004 season after a 38–31 road loss to the Mississippi State Bulldogs (who were 1–5 prior to the game, including a home loss to Division I-AA Maine). He did not help his cause by getting into a heated argument with several fraternity members a few weeks earlier after being called in to defuse a dispute between the brothers and his players. Zook finished the regular season, but he did not coach the Gators in the Peach Bowl because he had already accepted the head coaching job at Illinois. Defensive coordinator Charlie Strong coached the Gators in the Peach Bowl. After Zook's departure, his successor Urban Meyer won a national title in 2006, largely with players whom Zook had recruited.

During his time at Florida, Zook did have some notable accomplishments. He handed both the 2002 Georgia Bulldogs and 2003 LSU Tigers their only loss of the year. His Gators defeated three highly ranked teams in succession in 2003, all away from home (LSU, Arkansas and Georgia). In his final game he defeated the Florida State Seminoles at Tallahassee, something that Steve Spurrier never accomplished. That victory occurred on the night when FSU dedicated Bobby Bowden Field, leading Gator fans to refer to it as Ron Zook Field. Zook had winning records against SEC foes Georgia (2–1) and Auburn (1–0). Zook was regarded as a fine recruiter who brought a great deal of talent to Florida during his tenure as head coach. Following the Gators' victory over Ohio State in the 2007 BCS National Championship Game, Urban Meyer praised Zook for recruiting the large class of seniors who played in the game. Twenty-two of the 24 starters were recruited to Florida by Zook.

==== University of Illinois ====
In 2005, the University of Illinois hired Zook to replace Ron Turner as the head coach of the Illinois Fighting Illini football team. Zook inherited a program which had become a disaster since winning the Big Ten championship in 2001. They had only won nine games in the three seasons since, and only five games in Big Ten play. In Zook's inaugural season of 2005, Illinois finished with an overall record of 2–9, and a record of 0–8 in Big Ten games.

Despite his team's past struggles, Zook improved the ability of Illinois to recruit top football talent. According to one source, the 2006 recruiting class was one of the 30 best in college football. Despite this, they finished the 2006 season 1–7 in the conference and 2–10 overall. While the record did not improve, the play on the field did as the Illini nearly upset top ranked Ohio State in Champaign before losing 17–10. Additionally, the Illini played well against Iowa, Wisconsin, and Penn State (they lost 63–10 the year before; Penn State led 56–3 at halftime) but ended up losing close games (they were down 15–12 at Penn State until Penn State broke open a close game to make it 26–12).

The 2006 recruiting class included Isiah "Juice" Williams of Chicago Vocational High School, considered to be one of the top quarterback recruits in the country. In late 2006, Zook signed Arrelious Benn, one of the top wide receiver prospects in the 2007 class. More recently, Zook also won over Simeon High School standout Martez Wilson along with Florida prospect D'Angelo McCray. This class was one of Illinois' best in recent memory, being rated within the top 25 nationally by some experts.

===== 2007 season =====
Zook's recruiting success finally began to pay dividends during the 2007 season. After losing a close game on neutral turf to a Missouri squad which went on to be ranked as high as #1, the Illini ran off five straight wins, including back-to-back home wins over Penn State and Wisconsin. Illinois' 5–1 start gave them a #18 ranking in the AP Poll. This was Illinois' first ranking in the AP Poll since the end of the 2001 season. However, the ranking proved to be short-lived after consecutive losses to Iowa and Michigan. A homecoming win over Ball State gave the Illini bowl eligibility and a blowout win at Minnesota all but assured Zook's first bowl appearance as coach of the Illini. On November 10, the then-unranked Illini defeated #1-ranked Ohio State in Columbus. The Illini finished the 2007 regular season by defeating Northwestern to finish 9–3 overall, 6–2 in the Big Ten. Because Big Ten champion Ohio State played in the BCS National Championship game, Illinois received a bid to play in the Rose Bowl as the second ranked team in the Big Ten. Their improvement of seven wins over the 2006 season was the largest such increase of any Division I team. His success earned Zook a contract extension in October 2007, which paid him approximately $1.5 million through the 2013 season. Zook's success on recruiting trail continued as well, with Illinois having the #17 recruiting class in 2008 according to rivals.com.

On November 20, 2007, Ron Zook was selected as the Big Ten Coach of the Year. Zook also was awarded the Liberty Mutual Coach of the Year Award following the 2007 season. After making the 2008 Rose Bowl, Illinois was squashed 49–17 by the USC Trojans, putting a damper on an otherwise great season.

===== 2008 season =====
Expectations were high for 2008, but Illinois didn't live up to those expectations early on, as they lost to Missouri, 52–42, in their season opener and to Penn State, 38–24. After a 27–20 loss to Minnesota, Illinois crushed Indiana, 55–13. However, the Fighting Illini fell to Wisconsin the very next week; Wisconsin had been winless in Big Ten play prior to that game. While Zook's team was able to upset Iowa 27–24 a week after their loss to Wisconsin, the Illini finished 2008 with a three-game losing streak at the hands of Western Michigan (23–17), Ohio State (30–20), and Northwestern (27–10).

===== 2009 season =====
Despite a very disappointing 2008 season, Zook's 2009 Fighting Illini team received AP Poll votes. As they had the previous two years, Illinois started off the season with a loss to Missouri, but this time, the result was far more lopsided than the previous affairs; Missouri won 39–7. Illinois stomped Illinois State 45–17 the next week, but then they suffered an embarrassing 30–0 shutout at the hands of Ohio State. Illinois lost their next four games by ten points or more (including a 27–14 loss to Indiana, the Hoosiers' only Big Ten win of the season), sinking to 1–6 overall. Zook's team then put together a stunning 38-13 blowout of the Michigan Wolverines in Memorial Stadium, followed up with a 35–32 upset of Minnesota the next week. After back-to-back wins, the Illini fell to the rival Northwestern Wildcats, 21–16. To close out the season, the Fighting Illini put up a fight against Cincinnati, who finished the year undefeated, but were unable to pull off the upset; and they fell at home to Fresno State in a wild 53–52 game in the season finale.

At the end of the 2009 season, offensive coordinator Mike Schultz was released from his contract, and co-defensive coordinators Dan Disch and Curt Mallory were demoted to position coaches. Illinois hired Paul Petrino as offensive coordinator, and Vic Koenning as defensive coordinator.

===== 2010 season =====
After back-to-back disappointing years, the Illini had almost no pre-season expectations entering 2010. Juice Williams and Arrelious Benn were no longer on the team. However, running back Mikel Leshoure was, and he proved to be an invaluable asset on offense, while Illinois started freshman Nathan Scheelhaase at quarterback.

They started off 2010 by losing to Missouri for the fourth consecutive year, 23–13. They held a 13–3 lead that almost lasted the length of the game. After the early loss, Illinois defeated Southern Illinois, 35–3, and Northern Illinois, 28–22. While the Fighting Illini lost to Ohio State in their Big Ten opener, they gave the Buckeyes a scare, knocking out quarterback Terrelle Pryor and holding the Buckeye passing offense almost entirely in check. Illinois then traveled to Penn State to take on a Nittany Lions program that was undefeated at home against the Fighting Illini. Illinois handed Penn State a stunning 33–13 loss on homecoming. They went on to finish the season with a win in the Texas Bowl, a comfortable 38-13 victory against Baylor.

===== 2011 season =====
As the 2011 season begun, the Illini were picked by most experts to finish near the bottom of the newly formed Leaders Division. However, Illinois got off to one of their best starts in history by winning their first six games. After taking care of Arkansas State, 33–15, and blasting South Dakota State, 56–3, the Fighting Illini won a trio of home games by a margin of a field goal over 22nd-ranked Arizona State (17–14), Western Michigan (23–20), and Northwestern (38–35) in a game in which Illinois rallied from a 28–10 deficit in the second half.

After defeating Indiana 41–20 in Illinois' first road game of the season, the Illini were 6–0 for the first time since 1951 and they climbed to 15th in the Coaches' Poll and 16th in the AP Poll. However, the Illini lost 17–7 to Ohio State and the season seemed headed towards a downward spiral as Illinois lost a pair of close road games at Purdue (21–14) and Penn State (10–7). Illinois returned home and lost to Michigan, 31–14.

On the Tuesday before the Wisconsin game, Zook opened his weekly press conference by warning the reporters not to ask questions about his job status. When reporter Shannon Ryan of the Chicago Tribune asked Zook if he had talked to his players about the rumors pertaining to his future, he walked out of the press conference. The Illini went on to lose to Wisconsin, 28–17, and finished the regular season with a 27–7 loss to Minnesota. With the loss to the Golden Gophers, Illinois became the first team in NCAA Division I FBS history to start a season 6–0, and end it at 6–6.

Zook was fired on November 27, 2011. His final record at Illinois was 34–51. The Illini received a bowl invitation, and they defeated UCLA in the Kraft Fight Hunger Bowl. It was the first time in school history that the football team won back-to-back bowl games.

=== Back to the NFL ===
After leaving Illinois, Zook spent two seasons out of football, during which time he worked as a college football studio analyst for CBS and took an executive position at a bank in Ocala, Florida.

In 2014, Zook was hired by the Green Bay Packers to the position of assistant special teams coordinator. He was not retained by the team after the 2018 season.

=== Alliance of American Football ===
On February 28, 2019, Zook joined the Salt Lake Stallions of the Alliance of American Football as special teams coordinator and secondary coach. The league folded during the 2019 season.

=== Maryland ===
In 2019, Maryland head coach Mike Locksley hired Zook as a senior analyst; Locksley had worked under Zook at Illinois as his offensive coordinator and at Florida as running backs coach and recruiting coordinator. Zook was promoted to special teams coordinator in 2021 before stepping down after one season.

In 2024, Zook was rehired by Locksley as a special teams quality control coach.

=== XFL ===
In June 2021, Zook was announced as the defensive coordinator under Jim Haslett in the XFL. On January 1, 2024, it was announced the Sea Dragons would not be a part of the UFL merger.

== Head coaching record ==
Year	Team	Overall	Conference	Standing	Bowl/playoffs	Coaches^{#}	AP^{°}
Florida Gators (Southeastern Conference) (2002–2004)
2002	Florida	8–5	6–2	2nd (Eastern)	L Outback	24	
2003	Florida	8–5	6–2	T–1st (Eastern)	L Outback	25	24
2004	Florida	7–4 (Note: Zook left for Illinois after the regular season; defensive coordinator Charlie Strong coached Florida in the Peach Bowl. Florida credits the regular season to Zook and the Peach Bowl to Strong.)	4–4	3rd (Eastern)	Peach	25	
Florida:		23–14	16–8				
Illinois Fighting Illini (Big Ten Conference) (2005–2011)
2005	Illinois	2–9	0–8	11th			
2006	Illinois	2–10	1–7	10th			
2007	Illinois	9–4	6–2	2nd	L Rose^{†}	18	20
2008	Illinois	5–7	3–5	8th			
2009	Illinois	3–9	2–6	9th			
2010	Illinois	7–6	4–4	T–4th	W Texas		
2011	Illinois	6–6 (Note: Zook was fired at the end of the regular season; defensive coordinator Vic Koenning was appointed as interim head coach and coached Illinois in the Kraft Fight Hunger Bowl. Illinois credits the regular season to Zook and the Fight Hunger Bowl to Koenning.)	2–6	5th (Leaders)	Fight Hunger		
Illinois:		34–51	18–38				
Total:		57–65					
National championship Conference title Conference division title or championship game berth
^{†}Indicates BCS bowl.; ^{#}Rankings from final Coaches Poll.; ^{°}Rankings from final AP Poll.

== See also ==
- List of Miami University people
