= 2004 Florida State Seminoles football team =

American college football season

2004 Florida State Seminoles football

Gator Bowl champion

Gator Bowl, W 30–18 vs. West Virginia
- Conference: Atlantic Coast Conference

Ranking
- Coaches: No. 14
- AP: No. 15
- Record: 9–3 (6–2 ACC)
- Head coach: Bobby Bowden (29th season)
- Offensive coordinator: Jeff Bowden (4th season)
- Offensive scheme: Pro-style
- Defensive coordinator: Mickey Andrews (21st season)
- Base defense: 4–3
- Captains: Jerome Carter; Alex Barron; Bryant McFadden
- Home stadium: Doak Campbell Stadium

2004 Atlantic Coast Conference football standings
	Conf.			Overall
Team	W		L	W		L
No. 10 Virginia Tech $	7	–	1	10	–	3
No. 15 Florida State	6	–	2	9	–	3
No. 11 Miami (FL)	5	–	3	9	–	3
No. 23 Virginia	5	–	3	8	–	4
North Carolina	5	–	3	6	–	6
Georgia Tech	4	–	4	7	–	5
Clemson	4	–	4	6	–	5
NC State	3	–	5	5	–	6
Maryland	3	–	5	5	–	6
Wake Forest	1	–	7	4	–	7
Duke	1	–	7	2	–	9
$ – BCS representative as conference champion; Rankings from AP Poll

The 2004 Florida State Seminoles football team represented the Florida State University as a member of the Atlantic Coast Conference (ACC) during the 2004 NCAA Division I-A football season. Led by 29th-year head coach Bobby Bowden, the Seminoles compiled an overall record of 9–3 with a mark of 6–2 in conference play, placing second in the ACC. Florida State was invited to the Gator Bowl, where the Seminoles defeated West Virginia. The team played home games at Doak Campbell Stadium in Tallahassee, Florida.

== Schedule ==
Date	Time	Opponent	Rank	Site	TV	Result	Attendance	Source
September 10	8:00 p.m.	at No. 5 Miami (FL)	No. 4	Miami Orange Bowl; Miami, Fl (rivalry)	ABC	L 10–16 ^{OT}	78,622	
September 18	6:30 p.m.	UAB*	No. 8	Doak Campbell Stadium; Tallahassee, FL	ESPN2	W 34–7	81,825	
September 25	3:30 p.m.	Clemson	No. 8	Doak Campbell Stadium; Tallahassee, FL (rivalry)	ABC	W 41–22	83,538	
October 2	12:00 p.m.	North Carolina	No. 9	Doak Campbell Stadium; Tallahassee, FL	ESPN2	W 38–16	82,708	
October 9	7:00 p.m.	at Syracuse*	No. 8	Carrier Dome; Syracuse, NY	ESPN2	W 17–13	40,539	
October 16	7:45 p.m.	No. 6 Virginia	No. 7	Doak Campbell Stadium; Tallahassee, FL (Jefferson-Eppes Trophy)	ESPN	W 36–3	84,155	
October 23	3:30 p.m.	at Wake Forest	No. 5	Groves Stadium; Winston-Salem, NC	ABC	W 20–17	31,403	
October 30	3:30 p.m.	at Maryland	No. 5	Byrd Stadium; College Park, MD	ABC	L 17–20	52,203	
November 6	12:00 p.m.	Duke^{†}	No. 13	Doak Campbell Stadium; Tallahassee, FL	PPV	W 29–7	80,598	
November 11	7:30 p.m.	at NC State	No. 11	Carter–Finley Stadium; Raleigh, NC	ESPN	W 17–10	56,800	
November 20	7:45 p.m.	Florida*	No. 10	Doak Campbell Stadium; Tallahassee, FL (rivalry)	ESPN	L 13–20	84,223	
January 1	12:30 p.m.	vs. West Virginia*	No. 16	Alltel Stadium; Jacksonville, FL (Gator Bowl)	NBC	W 30–18	70,112	
*Non-conference game; ^{†}Homecoming; Rankings from Coaches' Poll released prior to the game; All times are in Eastern time

== Game summaries ==
=== At Miami (FL) ===
Originally scheduled for September 6, the game between Miami and Florida State was postponed to September 10 due to Hurricane Frances. On September 10, both teams met at the Orange Bowl in Miami. The Seminoles took the upper hand in the first half with a 45-yard field goal by Xavier Beitia and a 61-yard defensive fumble return by Antonio Cromartie. In the fourth quarter the Miami Hurricanes tied the score with an 18-yard field goal Jon Peattie and a 30-yard pass from Brock Berlin to Sinorice Moss with 30 seconds remaining. In overtime, Frank Gore broke an 18-yard run for the Hurricanes to seal the victory.

	1	2	3	4	OT	Total
Seminoles	3	7	0	0	0	10
Hurricanes	0	0	0	10	6	16

=== UAB ===
Returning to Tallahassee after a road loss to Miami, Florida State opened the game with a 17-point lead over the Blazers with two short runs from Chris Rix and James Coleman in addition to a 30-yard kick from Xavier Beitia. In the second half, two more short runs by BJ Dean and Leon Washington in addition to a Xavier Beitia kick sealed the score at 34–7.

	1	2	3	4	Total
UAB	0	7	0	0	7
Seminoles	7	10	7	10	34

=== Clemson ===
Entering the game as the #8 team in the nation, the Seminoles allowed a 97-yard kickoff return by Clemson's Justin Miller and a 3rd quarter return by Miller that went 86 yards for six points. Florida State responded with a final 17 unanswered points that began with a 35-yard rushing touchdown from Leon Washington.

	1	2	3	4	Total
Tigers	7	7	8	0	22
Seminoles	3	14	14	10	41

=== North Carolina ===
Florida State balanced offense choose to go to the air against North Carolina as Wyatt Sexton threw for 263 yards and three touchdowns. It was Sexton's first start for the Seminoles. On the ground, Leon Washington rushed for 153 yards on 10 carries, the longest being a 53-yard run.

	1	2	3	4	Total
Tar Heels	3	3	7	3	16
Seminoles	7	14	10	7	38

=== At Syracuse ===
In their first road game in a month, Florida State scrapped out a win against the Syracuse Orange. Going into the half, Florida State trailed 3–10, but provided an explosion of offense with two rushing touchdowns from Leon Washington. The second of two Washington touchdowns came on the second play of a late drive in which Washington ran for 45 yards.

	1	2	3	4	Total
Seminoles	3	0	7	7	17
Orange	10	0	0	3	13

=== Virginia ===
The most lop-sided victory of the 2004 year, the Seminole defense dominated Virginia's running game by allowing only 20 rushing yards on 29 plays. #6 Virginia gave up a safety and seventeen points to follow before kicking a field goal as time expired in the 1st half, their only points of the game. The Seminoles than put the Cavs away with 2 unanswered touchdowns in the final quarter. Wyatt Sexton played an instrumental part in the Seminole victory achieving 20 completions on 26 attempts for 275 yards.

	1	2	3	4	Total
Cavaliers	0	3	0	0	3
Seminoles	2	17	3	14	36

=== At Wake Forest ===
In one of the closest games of the year, three turnovers by Wyatt Sexton kept the Demon Deacons ahead of the Seminoles until the final minutes of the game. A 48-yard punt return by Willie Reid put the Seminoles in place for a 20-yard pass from Sexton to Greg Reid. In the fourth quarter, a 46-yard run by Lorenzo Booker led to the game-winning field goal.

	1	2	3	4	Total
Seminoles	0	3	7	10	20
Demon Deacons	7	7	0	3	17

=== At Maryland ===
Florida State's 14 game win streak against Maryland was snapped. Maryland aggressively defended the Seminole's running game to 50 yards. Moreover, Wyatt Sexton threw 14 completions for 30 attempts and allowed two interceptions.

	1	2	3	4	Total
Seminoles	3	0	7	7	17
Terrapins	3	10	7	3	23

=== Duke ===
The #13 Seminoles handled the Blue Devils in a lop-sided victory driven by Wyatt Sexton's 220 yard second-half. Florida State's two touchdowns came off a 45-yard pass from Wyatt Sexton to Chris Davis and a 4-yard run by Lamar Davis.

	1	2	3	4	Total
Blue Devils	0	7	0	0	7
Seminoles	9	0	10	10	29

=== At NC State ===
With the exception of a 44-yard Gary Cisemsia kick, the Seminoles scored only on the ground with rushing touchdowns by Lorenzo Booker and James Coleman. N.C. State was limited to a paltry 23 rushing yards and 1 for 16 on third down attempts.

	1	2	3	4	Total
Seminoles	0	0	17	0	17
Wolfpack	0	0	10	0	10

=== Florida ===
Florida won for the first time in Tallahassee since 1986 under head coach Ron Zook. The Florida State offense was limited to 1 for 15 on third down conversions although Sexton and Rix threw for a combined 314 yards.

	1	2	3	4	Total
Gators	7	3	0	10	20
Seminoles	0	3	0	10	13

=== Vs. West Virginia—Gator Bowl ===
	1	2	3	4	Total
Seminoles	10	3	10	7	30
Mountaineers	12	0	3	3	18
