= 2004 Wake Forest Demon Deacons football team =

American college football season

2004 Wake Forest Demon Deacons football
- Conference: Atlantic Coast Conference
- Record: 4–7 (1–7 ACC)
- Head coach: Jim Grobe (4th season)
- Offensive coordinator: Steed Lobotzke (2nd season)
- Offensive scheme: Spread
- Defensive coordinator: Dean Hood (4th season)
- Base defense: 4–3
- Captain: Game captains
- Home stadium: Groves Stadium

2004 Atlantic Coast Conference football standings
	Conf.			Overall
Team	W		L	W		L
No. 10 Virginia Tech $	7	–	1	10	–	3
No. 15 Florida State	6	–	2	9	–	3
No. 11 Miami (FL)	5	–	3	9	–	3
No. 23 Virginia	5	–	3	8	–	4
North Carolina	5	–	3	6	–	6
Georgia Tech	4	–	4	7	–	5
Clemson	4	–	4	6	–	5
NC State	3	–	5	5	–	6
Maryland	3	–	5	5	–	6
Wake Forest	1	–	7	4	–	7
Duke	1	–	7	2	–	9
$ – BCS representative as conference champion; Rankings from AP Poll

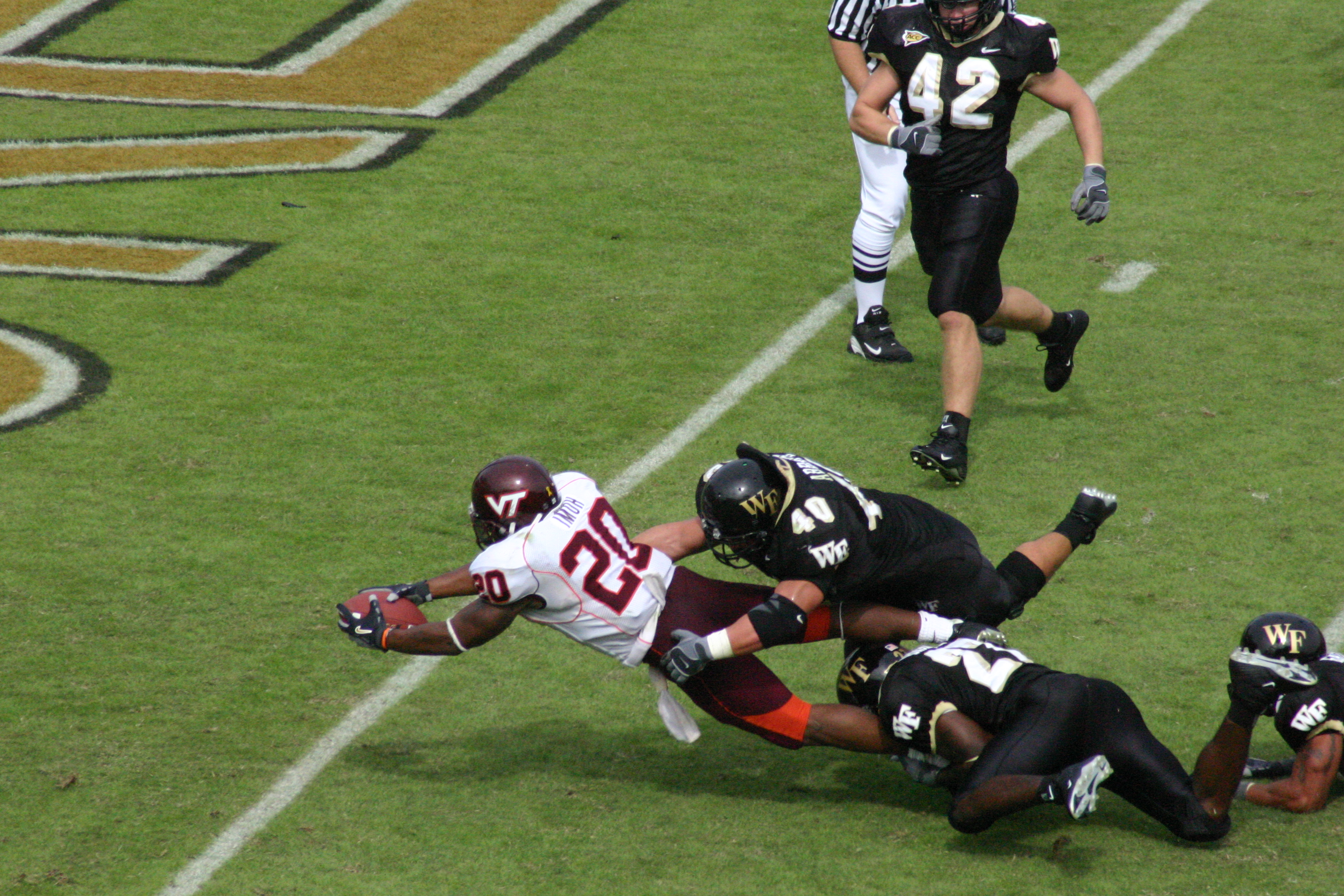
Mike Imoh dives for a touchdown

The 2004 Wake Forest Demon Deacons football team was an American football team that represented Wake Forest University as a member of the Atlantic Coast Conference (ACC) during the 2004 NCAA Division I-A football season. In their fourth season under head coach Jim Grobe, the Demon Deacons compiled a 4–7 record (1–7 in conference games, were outscored by a total of 253 to 230, and finished in a tie for last place in the ACC.

The teams statistical leaders included Cory Randolph (1,010 passing yards), Chris Barclay (1,010 rushing yards and 54 points scored), and Nate Morton (391 receiving yards).

The team played its home games at Groves Stadium in Winston-Salem, North Carolina.

== Schedule ==
Date	Time	Opponent	Site	TV	Result	Attendance	Source
September 4	3:30 pm	at No. 15 Clemson	Memorial Stadium; Clemson, SC	ABC	L 30–37 ^{2OT}	78,624	
September 11	7:00 pm	at East Carolina*	Dowdy–Ficklen Stadium; Greenville, NC		W 31–17	38,141	
September 18	6:30 pm	North Carolina A&T*	Groves Stadium; Winston-Salem, NC		W 42–3	27,893	
September 25	12:00 pm	Boston College*	Groves Stadium; Winston-Salem, NC	ESPN2	W 17–14	29,461	
October 2	12:00 pm	at NC State	Carter–Finley Stadium; Raleigh, NC (rivalry)	JPS	L 21–27 ^{OT}	55,600	
October 9	12:00 pm	Virginia Tech	Groves Stadium; Winston-Salem, NC	JPS	L 10–17	32,433	
October 23	3:30 pm	No. 5 Florida State^{†}	Groves Stadium; Winston-Salem, NC	ABC	L 17–20	31,403	
October 30	12:00 pm	Duke	Groves Stadium; Winston-Salem, NC (rivalry)	JPS	W 24–22	25,762	
November 13	12:00 pm	North Carolina	Groves Stadium; Winston-Salem, NC (rivalry)	JPS	L 24–31	37,623	
November 20	12:00 pm	at No. 12 Miami (FL)	Miami Orange Bowl; Miami, FL	ESPN	L 7–52	41,315	
November 27	12:00 pm	at Maryland	Byrd Stadium; College Park, MD	ESPN	L 7–13	48,226	
*Non-conference game; ^{†}Homecoming; Rankings from AP Poll released prior to the game; All times are in Eastern time

== Team leaders ==
Category	Team Leader	Att/Cth	Yds
Passing	Cory Randolph	78/147	972
Rushing	Chris Barclay	243	1,010
Receiving	Nate Morton	26	391
