= 2004 Clemson Tigers football team =

American college football season

2004 Clemson Tigers football
- Conference: Atlantic Coast Conference
- Record: 6–5 (4–4 ACC)
- Head coach: Tommy Bowden (6th season)
- Offensive coordinator: Mike O'Cain (1st season)
- Offensive scheme: Pro-style
- Defensive coordinator: John Lovett (3rd season)
- Base defense: 4–3
- Captains: Eric Coleman; Airese Currie; Leroy Hill
- Home stadium: Memorial Stadium

2004 Atlantic Coast Conference football standings
	Conf.			Overall
Team	W		L	W		L
No. 10 Virginia Tech $	7	–	1	10	–	3
No. 15 Florida State	6	–	2	9	–	3
No. 11 Miami (FL)	5	–	3	9	–	3
No. 23 Virginia	5	–	3	8	–	4
North Carolina	5	–	3	6	–	6
Georgia Tech	4	–	4	7	–	5
Clemson	4	–	4	6	–	5
NC State	3	–	5	5	–	6
Maryland	3	–	5	5	–	6
Wake Forest	1	–	7	4	–	7
Duke	1	–	7	2	–	9
$ – BCS representative as conference champion; Rankings from AP Poll

The 2004 Clemson Tigers football team represented Clemson University as a member of the Atlantic Coast Conference (ACC) during the 2004 NCAA Division I-A football season. Led by sixth-year head coach Tommy Bowden, the Tigers compiled an overall record of 6–5 with a mark of 4–4 in conference play, tying for sixth place in the ACC. Clemson won its 600th game in program history on November 20, against South Carolina, in a contest notable for a brawl between the two teams. Due to the brawl, the Tigers declined a bowl game bid because of the unsportsmanlike nature of the fight. The team played home games at Memorial Stadium in Clemson, South Carolina.

As of 2026, this was the last season in which the Tigers did not participate in a bowl game.

== Schedule ==
Date	Time	Opponent	Rank	Site	TV	Result	Attendance
September 4	3:30 p.m.	Wake Forest	No. 15	Memorial Stadium; Clemson, SC	ABC	W 37–30 ^{2OT}	78,624
September 11	8:00 p.m.	Georgia Tech	No. 20	Memorial Stadium; Clemson, SC (rivalry)	ABC	L 24–28	81,427
September 18	7:00 p.m.	at Texas A&M*		Kyle Field; College Station, TX	TBS	L 6–27	71,565
September 25	3:30 p.m.	at No. 8 Florida State		Doak Campbell Stadium; Tallahassee, FL (rivalry)	ABC	L 22–41	83,538
October 7	7:30 p.m.	at No. 10 Virginia		Scott Stadium; Charlottesville, VA	ESPN	L 10–30	61,833
October 16	1:00 p.m.	Utah State*^{†}		Memorial Stadium; Clemson, SC		W 35–6	76,514
October 23	12:00 p.m.	Maryland		Memorial Stadium; Clemson, SC	JPS	W 10–7	76,603
October 30	12:00 p.m.	NC State		Memorial Stadium; Clemson, SC (Textile Bowl)	ESPN2	W 26–20	77,399
November 6	7:45 p.m.	at No. 11 Miami (FL)		Miami Orange Bowl; Miami, FL	ESPN	W 24–17 ^{OT}	55,225
November 13	1:00 p.m.	at Duke		Wallace Wade Stadium; Durham, NC		L 13–16	24,714
November 20	12:00 p.m.	South Carolina*		Memorial Stadium; Clemson, SC (rivalry)	JPS	W 29–7	82,372
*Non-conference game; ^{†}Homecoming; Rankings from AP Poll released prior to the game; All times are in Eastern time
