= Phillip Alexander (American football) =

American football player (born 1983)

No. 48 – Duke Blue Devils
- Position: Defensive end

Personal information
- Born: June 1, 1983; St. Louis, Missouri, U.S.

Career information
- College: Duke (2001–2005)

Phillip Alexander (born June 1, 1983) is an American college football defensive end who played for the Houston Texans. He played college football for the Duke Blue Devils.

== Early life ==
Alexander moved from St. Louis, Missouri to The Bronx at the age of seven to live with his maternal grandparents after his mother, Cleodora, was diagnosed with multiple sclerosis. His father, Douglas, died of heart failure when he was eight. Alexander played soccer and basketball in his youth before he was given permission to play football in seventh grade. He later played football at Mount Saint Michael Academy, where he recorded 93 tackles and 12 sacks as a senior.

== College career ==
Alexander was initially a linebacker at Duke. He was converted to a defensive lineman midway through his second season. As a junior in 2003, Alexander recorded 59 tackles, 18.5 tackles for loss, and 6.5 sacks in a breakout season. After being named team captain as a senior, he broke his left fibula against UConn in the second game of the season on September 11, 2004, undergoing surgery two days later. Alexander returned for a fifth season after taking a medical redshirt. He played in all 11 games, recording 41 tackles, 6.5 tackles for loss, and two sacks.

== Professional career ==
Alexander was invited to a workout by the New York Giants. He was signed on May 4, 2006, by the Houston Texans as an undrafted free agent. He was released on August 14, 2006.
