= 2004 Virginia Cavaliers football team =

American college football season

2004 Virginia Cavaliers football

MPC Computers Bowl, L 34–37 ^{OT} vs. Fresno State
- Conference: Atlantic Coast Conference

Ranking
- Coaches: No. 23
- AP: No. 23
- Record: 8–4 (5–3 ACC)
- Head coach: Al Groh (4th season)
- Offensive coordinator: Ron Prince (2nd season)
- Defensive coordinator: Al Golden (4th season)
- Home stadium: Scott Stadium

2004 Atlantic Coast Conference football standings
	Conf.			Overall
Team	W		L	W		L
No. 10 Virginia Tech $	7	–	1	10	–	3
No. 15 Florida State	6	–	2	9	–	3
No. 11 Miami (FL)	5	–	3	9	–	3
No. 23 Virginia	5	–	3	8	–	4
North Carolina	5	–	3	6	–	6
Georgia Tech	4	–	4	7	–	5
Clemson	4	–	4	6	–	5
NC State	3	–	5	5	–	6
Maryland	3	–	5	5	–	6
Wake Forest	1	–	7	4	–	7
Duke	1	–	7	2	–	9
$ – BCS representative as conference champion; Rankings from AP Poll

The 2004 Virginia Cavaliers football team represented the University of Virginia as a member of the Atlantic Coast Conference (ACC) during the 2004 NCAA Division I-A football season. Led by fourth-year head coach Al Groh, the Cavaliers compiled an overall record of 8–4 with a mark of 5–3 in conference play, placing in a three-way tie for third in the ACC. Virginia was invited to the MPC Computers Bowl, where the Cavaliers lost to Fresno State. The team played home games at Scott Stadium in Charlottesville, Virginia.

== Schedule ==
Date	Time	Opponent	Rank	Site	TV	Result	Attendance
September 4	12:00 pm	at Temple*	No. 16	Lincoln Financial Field; Philadelphia, PA	ESPN2	W 44–14	20,154
September 11	3:30 pm	North Carolina	No. 15	Scott Stadium; Charlottesville, VA (South's Oldest Rivalry)	ABC	W 56–24	62,790
September 18	3:00 pm	Akron*	No. 12	Scott Stadium; Charlottesville, VA		W 51–0	57,868
September 25	3:30 pm	Syracuse*	No. 12	Scott Stadium; Charlottesville, VA		W 31–10	59,699
October 7	7:30 pm	Clemson	No. 10	Scott Stadium; Charlottesville, VA	ESPN	W 30–10	61,833
October 16	8:00 pm	at No. 7 Florida State	No. 6	Doak Campbell Stadium; Tallahassee, FL (Jefferson–Eppes Trophy)	ESPN	L 3–36	84,155
October 23	1:00 pm	at Duke	No. 14	Wallace Wade Stadium; Durham, NC		W 37–16	24,157
November 6	3:30 pm	Maryland^{†}	No. 12	Scott Stadium; Charlottesville, VA (rivalry)	ABC	W 16–0	63,072
November 13	3:30 pm	No. 18 Miami (FL)	No. 10	Scott Stadium; Charlottesville, VA	ABC	L 21–31	63,701
November 20	1:00 pm	at Georgia Tech	No. 18	Bobby Dodd Stadium; Atlanta, GA	ABC	W 30–10	43,971
November 27	1:00 pm	at No. 11 Virginia Tech	No. 16	Lane Stadium; Blacksburg, VA (rivalry)	ABC	L 10–24	65,115
December 27	2:00 pm	vs. Fresno State*	No. 18	Bronco Stadium; Boise, ID (MPC Computers Bowl)	ESPN	L 34–37 ^{OT}	28,516
*Non-conference game; ^{†}Homecoming; Rankings from AP Poll released prior to the game; All times are in Eastern time

== Roster ==
2004 Virginia Cavaliers football team roster
Players
Coaches
Offense

Pos.	#	Name	Class
QB	11	Christian Olsen	So
QB	13	Kevin McCabe	Fr
QB	18	Marques Hagans	Jr
G	61	Elton Brown	Sr
OT	66	D'Brickashaw Ferguson	Jr
OT	69	Brad Butler	Jr
G	77	Ian-Yates Cunningham	So
OT	79	Gordie Sammis	So
TE	89	Heath Miller	Jr

Defense

Pos.	#	Name	Class
LB	56	Darryl Blackstock	Jr
DE	95	Chris Canty	Sr

Special teams

Pos.	#	Name	Class

Head coach

- Al Groh

Coordinators/assistant coaches

- Chad Wilt (Graduate assistant)

Legend

- (C) Team captain
- (S) Suspended
- (I) Ineligible
- Injured
- Redshirt

Roster
