= 2004 Peach Bowl (December) =

American college football game

2004 Chick-fil-A Peach Bowl
- 37th Peach Bowl
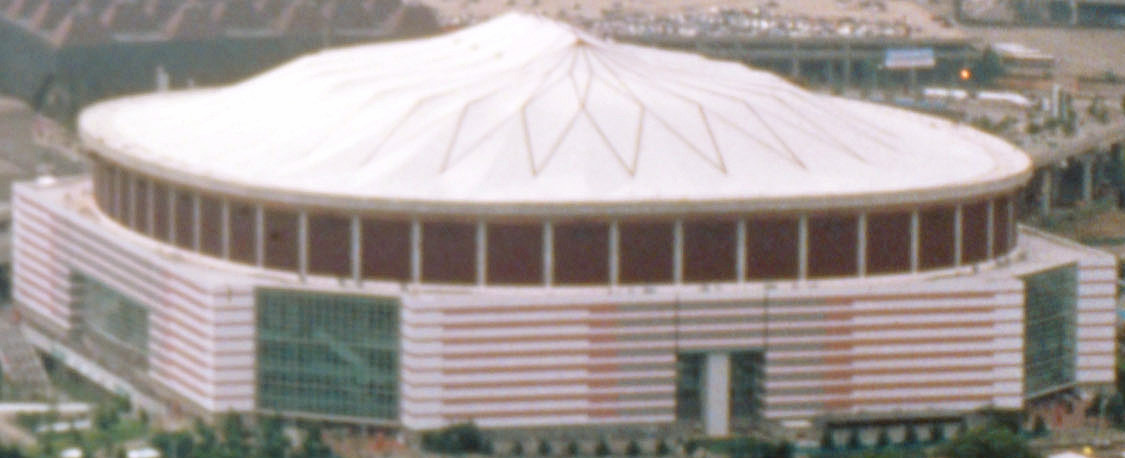
- The Georgia Dome in Atlanta, Georgia, hosted the Peach Bowl.
Florida Gators	Miami Hurricanes
(7–4)	(8–3)
SEC	ACC
10	27
Head coach: Charlie Strong (interim)	Head coach: Larry Coker
AP / Coaches / BCS; 20 / 19 / 23	AP / Coaches / BCS; 14 / 14 / 14
	1	2	3	4	Total
Florida	0	3	7	0	10
Miami	7	10	7	3	27
- Date: December 31, 2004
- Season: 2004
- Stadium: Georgia Dome
- Location: Atlanta, Georgia
- Referee: Marc Curles (Sun Belt)
- Attendance: 69,332

United States TV coverage
- Network: ESPN
- Announcers: Ron Franklin (Play-by-Play); Mike Gottfried (Analyst); Erin Andrews (Sidelines)

The 2004 Peach Bowl featured the Florida Gators and the Miami Hurricanes.

Miami took a 7–0 lead when it blocked a Florida field goal attempt, and Devin Hester returned the ball 78 yards for a touchdown. In the second quarter, Matt Leach kicked a 34-yard field goal to make it 10–3. Roscoe Parrish scored on a 72-yard punt return, giving Miami a 17–3 lead at halftime, even though it didn't score an offensive touchdown.

In the third quarter, Brock Berlin threw a 20-yard touchdown pass to Ryan Moore, and the Hurricanes led 24–3. Florida's Chris Leak threw a 45-yard touchdown pass to Jemalle Cornelius as the Gators got within 24–10. A 32-yard field goal from Miami gave the Hurricanes the 27–10 win.

== See also ==
- Florida–Miami football rivalry
