= List of Rutgers Scarlet Knights in the NFL draft =

This is a list of Rutgers Scarlet Knights football players in the NFL draft.

== Key ==
| B | Back | K | Kicker | NT | Nose tackle |
| C | Center | LB | Linebacker | FB | Fullback |
| DB | Defensive back | P | Punter | HB | Halfback |
| DE | Defensive end | QB | Quarterback | WR | Wide receiver |
| DT | Defensive tackle | RB | Running back | G | Guard |
| E | End | T | Offensive tackle | TE | Tight end |

== Selections ==
| Year | Round | Pick | Overall | Name | Team | Position |
|---|---|---|---|---|---|---|
| 1940 | 8 | 6 | 66 | Bill Tranavitch | Detroit Lions | B |
| 1943 | 28 | 4 | 264 | Ken MacDonald | Chicago Cardinals | C |
| 1945 | 21 | 3 | 211 | Art Price | Pittsburgh Steelers | B |
| 1949 | 2 | 8 | 19 | Frank Burns | Philadelphia Eagles | B |
| 1950 | 28 | 3 | 355 | Herm Hering | Green Bay Packers | B |
| 1951 | 30 | 4 | 355 | Leon Root | Chicago Cardinals | B |
| 1952 | 25 | 1 | 290 | Jim Monihan | New York Yanks | B |
| 1959 | 27 | 8 | 320 | Alex Kroll | Los Angeles Rams | C |
| 1959 | 28 | 5 | 329 | Billy Austin | Washington Redskins | B |
| 1960 | 10 | 12 | 120 | Bob Simms | New York Giants | E |
| 1962 | 12 | 6 | 160 | Sam Mudie | Pittsburgh Steelers | B |
| 1963 | 19 | 10 | 262 | Bob Yaksick | Chicago Bears | DB |
| 1967 | 13 | 12 | 327 | Jack Emmer | New York Jets | WR |
| 1970 | 5 | 8 | 112 | Bruce Van Ness | Atlanta Falcons | RB |
| 1974 | 9 | 14 | 222 | Jim Jennings | Kansas City Chiefs | RB |
| 1975 | 9 | 18 | 226 | Ed Jones | Dallas Cowboys | DB |
| 1977 | 11 | 12 | 291 | John Alexander | Miami Dolphins | DE |
| 1977 | 11 | 21 | 300 | Don Harris | Washington Redskins | DB |
| 1978 | 5 | 13 | 123 | Dan Gray | Detroit Lions | DE |
| 1981 | 8 | 13 | 206 | David Dorn | Kansas City Chiefs | WR |
| 1982 | 12 | 5 | 311 | Frank Naylor | Seattle Seahawks | C |
| 1983 | 2 | 26 | 54 | Bill Pickel | Los Angeles Raiders | DT |
| 1983 | 7 | 27 | 195 | Keith Woetzel | Miami Dolphins | LB |
| 1984 | 7 | 22 | 190 | Jim Dumont | Cleveland Browns | LB |
| 1985 | 7 | 19 | 187 | Alan Andrews | Pittsburgh Steelers | TE |
| 1987 | 7 | 22 | 190 | Harry Swayne | Tampa Bay Buccaneers | T |
| 1992 | 9 | 11 | 235 | Elnardo Webster | Pittsburgh Steelers | LB |
| 1994 | 4 | 5 | 108 | Chris Brantley | Los Angeles Rams | WR |
| 1995 | 7 | 8 | 216 | Keif Bryant | Seattle Seahawks | DE |
| 1996 | 2 | 9 | 39 | Marco Battaglia | Cincinnati Bengals | TE |
| 1996 | 3 | 16 | 77 | Robert Barr | Seattle Seahawks | T |
| 2001 | 5 | 18 | 149 | Mike McMahon | Detroit Lions | QB |
| 2003 | 2 | 29 | 61 | L. J. Smith | Philadelphia Eagles | TE |
| 2004 | 7 | 4 | 205 | Nathan Jones | Dallas Cowboys | DB |
| 2004 | 7 | 9 | 210 | Raheem Orr | Houston Texans | DE |
| 2007 | 2 | 20 | 52 | Brian Leonard | St. Louis Rams | RB |
| 2007 | 5 | 19 | 156 | Cameron Stephenson | Pittsburgh Steelers | G |
| 2007 | 7 | 33 | 243 | Clark Harris | Green Bay Packers | TE |
| 2008 | 2 | 24 | 55 | Ray Rice | Baltimore Ravens | RB |
| 2008 | 3 | 20 | 83 | Jeremy Zuttah | Tampa Bay Buccaneers | G |
| 2009 | 1 | 30 | 30 | Kenny Britt | Tennessee Titans | WR |
| 2009 | 6 | 5 | 178 | Mike Teel | Seattle Seahawks | QB |
| 2009 | 6 | 30 | 203 | Jason McCourty | Tennessee Titans | DB |
| 2009 | 7 | 36 | 245 | Courtney Greene | Seattle Seahawks | DB |
| 2009 | 7 | 44 | 253 | Tiquan Underwood | Jacksonville Jaguars | WR |
| 2010 | 1 | 11 | 11 | Anthony Davis | San Francisco 49ers | T |
| 2010 | 1 | 27 | 27 | Devin McCourty | New England Patriots | DB |
| 2010 | 7 | 30 | 237 | Ryan D'Imperio | Minnesota Vikings | LB |
| 2012 | 3 | 20 | 83 | Mohamed Sanu | Cincinnati Bengals | WR |
| 2013 | 3 | 21 | 83 | Logan Ryan | New England Patriots | DB |
| 2013 | 3 | 29 | 91 | Duron Harmon | New England Patriots | DB |
| 2013 | 4 | 20 | 117 | Khaseem Greene | Chicago Bears | LB |
| 2013 | 7 | 13 | 219 | D. C. Jefferson | Arizona Cardinals | TE |
| 2013 | 7 | 22 | 228 | Jawan Jamison | Washington Redskins | RB |
| 2013 | 7 | 29 | 235 | Steve Beauharnais | New England Patriots | LB |
| 2013 | 7 | 46 | 252 | Marcus Cooper | San Francisco 49ers | DB |
| 2015 | 3 | 21 | 85 | Tyler Kroft | Cincinnati Bengals | TE |
| 2015 | 5 | 32 | 168 | Michael Burton | Detroit Lions | FB |
| 2016 | 3 | 22 | 86 | Leonte Carroo | Miami Dolphins | WR |
| 2018 | 2 | 20 | 52 | Kemoko Turay | Indianapolis Colts | DE |
| 2018 | 6 | 21 | 195 | Sebastian Joseph-Day | Los Angeles Rams | DT |
| 2019 | 6 | 4 | 177 | Saquan Hampton | New Orleans Saints | DB |
| 2019 | 6 | 23 | 196 | Blessuan Austin | New York Jets | DB |
| 2022 | 7 | 8 | 229 | Bo Melton | Seattle Seahawks | WR |
| 2022 | 7 | 30 | 251 | Isiah Pacheco | Kansas City Chiefs | RB |
| 2023 | 6 | 35 | 202 | Christian Braswell | Jacksonville Jaguars | DB |
| 2024 | 2 | 11 | 43 | Max Melton | Arizona Cardinals | DB |
| 2025 | 6 | 35 | 212 | Robert Longerbeam | Baltimore Ravens | DB |
| 2025 | 7 | 8 | 214 | Kyonte Hamilton | Houston Texans | DT |
| 2025 | 7 | 17 | 233 | Kyle Monangai | Chicago Bears | RB |
| 2026 | 7 | 7 | 223 | Athan Kaliakmanis | Washington Commanders | QB |

== Notable undrafted players ==
Note: No drafts held before 1920

| Debut Year | Player | Position | Debut Team | Notes |
|---|---|---|---|---|
| 1973 | Leo Gasienica | QB | New York Giants | — |
| 1980 | Dino Mangiero | DT | Kansas City Chiefs | — |
| 1981 | Deron Cherry | S | Kansas City Chiefs | — |
| 1987 | Tyronne Stowe | LB | San Diego Chargers | — |
| 1988 | Brian Cobb | WR | Pittsburgh Steelers | — |
| 1993 | James Guarantano | WR | San Diego Chargers | — |
| 1994 | Jay Bellamy | S | Seattle Seahawks | — |
| 1996 | Ray Lucas | QB | New England Patriots | — |
| 2000 | Shaun O'Hara | C | Cleveland Browns | — |
| 2006 | Ryan Neill | DE | Buffalo Bills | — |
| 2008 | Ron Girault | S | Kansas City Chiefs | — |
| 2009 | Jamaal Westerman | LB | New York Jets | — |
| 2012 | Andrew DePaola | LS | Tampa Bay Buccaneers | — |
| 2012 | Justin Francis | DE | New England Patriots | — |
| 2013 | Mark Harrison | WR | New England Patriots | — |
| 2018 | Gus Edwards | RB | Baltimore Ravens | — |
| 2021 | Michael Dwumfour | DL | New York Jets | — |
| 2021 | Brendon White | DB | New York Jets | — |
| 2022 | Tre Avery | CB | Tennessee Titans | — |
| 2022 | Olakunle Fatukasi | LB | Tampa Bay Buccaneers | — |
| 2022 | Tyreek Maddox-Williams | LB | Los Angeles Chargers | — |
| 2023 | Aron Cruickshank | WR | Chicago Bears | — |
| 2023 | J. D. DiRenzo | OL | Carolina Panthers | — |
| 2023 | Christian Izien | S | Tampa Bay Buccaneers | — |
| 2023 | Ifeanyi Maijeh | DL | Seattle Seahawks | — |
| 2023 | Sean Ryan | WR | Baltimore Ravens | — |
| 2023 | Avery Young | DB | San Francisco 49ers | — |
| 2024 | Shawn Bowman | TE | Jacksonville Jaguars | — |
| 2024 | Isaiah Iton | DT | Tennessee Titans | — |
| 2024 | JaQuae Jackson | WR | Atlanta Falcons | — |
| 2024 | Deion Jennings | LB | Baltimore Ravens | — |
| 2024 | Jude McAtamney | PK | New York Giants | — |
| 2024 | Isaiah Washington | WR | Baltimore Ravens | — |
| 2025 | Desmond Igbinosun | DB | Baltimore Ravens | — |
| 2025 | Shaquan Loyal | DB | Cincinnati Bengals | — |
| 2025 | Dymere Miller | WR | New York Jets | — |
| 2025 | Hollin Pierce | OT | Philadelphia Eagles | — |
| 2025 | Tyreem Powell | LB | New Orleans Saints | — |
| 2025 | Eric Rogers | DB | Los Angeles Chargers | — |
| 2026 | Kenny Fletcher Jr. | TE | Tampa Bay Buccaneers | — |
| 2026 | Cam Miller | CB | Carolina Panthers | — |
| 2026 | Eric O'Neill | DE | Detroit Lions | — |
| 2026 | DT Sheffield | WR | New York Jets | — |
