= Benny Sapp =

American football player (born 1981)

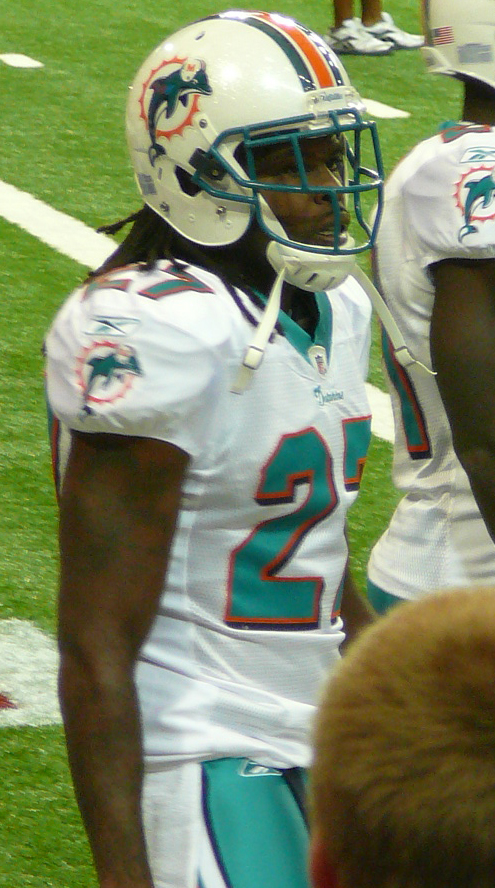
- Sapp with the Miami Dolphins in 2011

No. 27, 20, 22
- Position: Cornerback

Personal information
- Born: January 20, 1981 (age 45); Fort Lauderdale, Florida, U.S.
- Listed height: 5 ft 10 in (1.78 m)
- Listed weight: 190 lb (86 kg)

Career information
- High school: Boyd H. Anderson (Lauderdale Lakes, Florida)
- College: Northern Iowa
- NFL draft: 2004: undrafted

Career history
- Kansas City Chiefs (2004–2007); Minnesota Vikings (2008–2009); Miami Dolphins (2010–2011); Minnesota Vikings (2011)

Career NFL statistics
- Total tackles: 240
- Sacks: 2.5
- Forced fumbles: 6
- Pass deflections: 36
- Interceptions: 6
- Stats at Pro Football Reference

Benjamin Lee Sapp II (born January 20, 1981) is an American former professional football player who was a cornerback in the National Football League (NFL). He was signed by the Kansas City Chiefs as an undrafted free agent in 2004. He played college football for the Northern Iowa Panthers.

Sapp also played for the Miami Dolphins and Minnesota Vikings.

== Early life ==
Sapp attended Boyd Anderson High School in Fort Lauderdale, Florida and was a student and a letterman in football, wrestling, volleyball, and track and field. In football, as a senior, he was a first-team All-Broward County selection and an All-State Honorable Mention selection. Benny Sapp graduated from Boyd Anderson High School in 2000.

== College career ==
He appeared in 24 games (15 starts) with the Northern Iowa Panthers and 24 games (20 starts) with the Iowa Hawkeyes. He was removed from the Iowa Hawkeyes squad in 2002 due to charges of violence. He racked up 78 tackles, six interceptions, 29 passes deflected and four forced fumbles with the Panthers and 104 tackles and three interceptions in two seasons with the Hawkeyes.

== Professional career ==
=== Kansas City Chiefs ===
Sapp was signed by the Kansas City Chiefs as an undrafted free agent in 2004. He played for them until 2007.

=== Minnesota Vikings (first stint) ===
Sapp signed with the Vikings in 2008. In 2008 he stepped in to the Vikings starting nickel rotation after Charles Gordon went down. In 2008, he had 22 tackles along with 2 interceptions. On March 3, 2009, the Vikings re-signed him to a one-year contract. And re-signed him again for a two-year contract on March 9, 2010.

=== Miami Dolphins ===
Sapp was traded from the Vikings on August 25, 2010, to the Miami Dolphins for Greg Camarillo. For the Dolphins Sapp recorded 2 interceptions and had 10 pass deflections in 17 games. On September 12, 2011, during a Monday Night Football game against rival New England Patriots, Sapp was stiff-armed by Patriots WR Wes Welker on a 99-yard touchdown pass. The Dolphins cut Sapp the next day.

=== Minnesota Vikings (second stint) ===
After CB Antoine Winfield sustained a season-ending injury, Sapp was signed by the Vikings after a work out. He recorded 25 tackles and three pass deflections across seven games with the Vikings.

== NFL career statistics ==
Legend
**Bold**	Career high

=== Regular season ===
Year	Team	Games		Tackles					Interceptions					Fumbles			
Year	Team	GP	GS	Cmb	Solo	Ast	Sck	TFL	Int	Yds	TD	Lng	PD	FF	FR	Yds	TD
2004	KAN	15	1	16	15	1	0.0	0	1	0	0	0	5	1	0	0	0
2005	KAN	**16**	3	41	35	6	**2.5**	**3**	0	0	0	0	5	**2**	0	0	0
2006	KAN	11	0	17	16	1	0.0	2	0	0	0	0	0	0	0	0	0
2007	KAN	14	2	30	24	6	0.0	1	1	**15**	0	**15**	4	0	**1**	0	0
2008	MIN	14	4	21	18	3	0.0	0	**2**	13	0	14	2	1	0	0	0
2009	MIN	**16**	**7**	**44**	**40**	4	0.0	1	0	0	0	0	6	**2**	0	0	0
2010	MIA	**16**	6	41	34	**7**	0.0	**3**	**2**	9	0	9	**10**	0	**1**	0	0
2011	MIA	1	1	5	5	0	0.0	0	0	0	0	0	1	0	0	0	0
2011	MIN	7	3	25	18	**7**	0.0	2	0	0	0	0	3	0	0	0	0
		110	27	240	205	35	2.5	12	6	37	0	15	36	6	2	0	0

=== Playoffs ===
Year	Team	Games		Tackles					Interceptions					Fumbles			
Year	Team	GP	GS	Cmb	Solo	Ast	Sck	TFL	Int	Yds	TD	Lng	PD	FF	FR	Yds	TD
2008	MIN	1	1	**6**	**4**	**2**	0.0	0	0	0	0	0	0	0	0	0	0
2009	MIN	**2**	**2**	4	**4**	0	0.0	0	0	0	0	0	0	0	0	0	0
		3	3	10	8	2	0.0	0	0	0	0	0	0	0	0	0	0

== Personal life ==
Sapp's high school teammate Asante Samuel also has played in the NFL, most recently for the Atlanta Falcons. His son Benny Sapp III played for the Green Bay Packers and Atlanta Falcons.

Sapp is the cousin of former twin cornerbacks, Brandon Dixon and Brian Dixon who also played in the National Football League.
