= Devin McCourty =

American football player (born 1987)

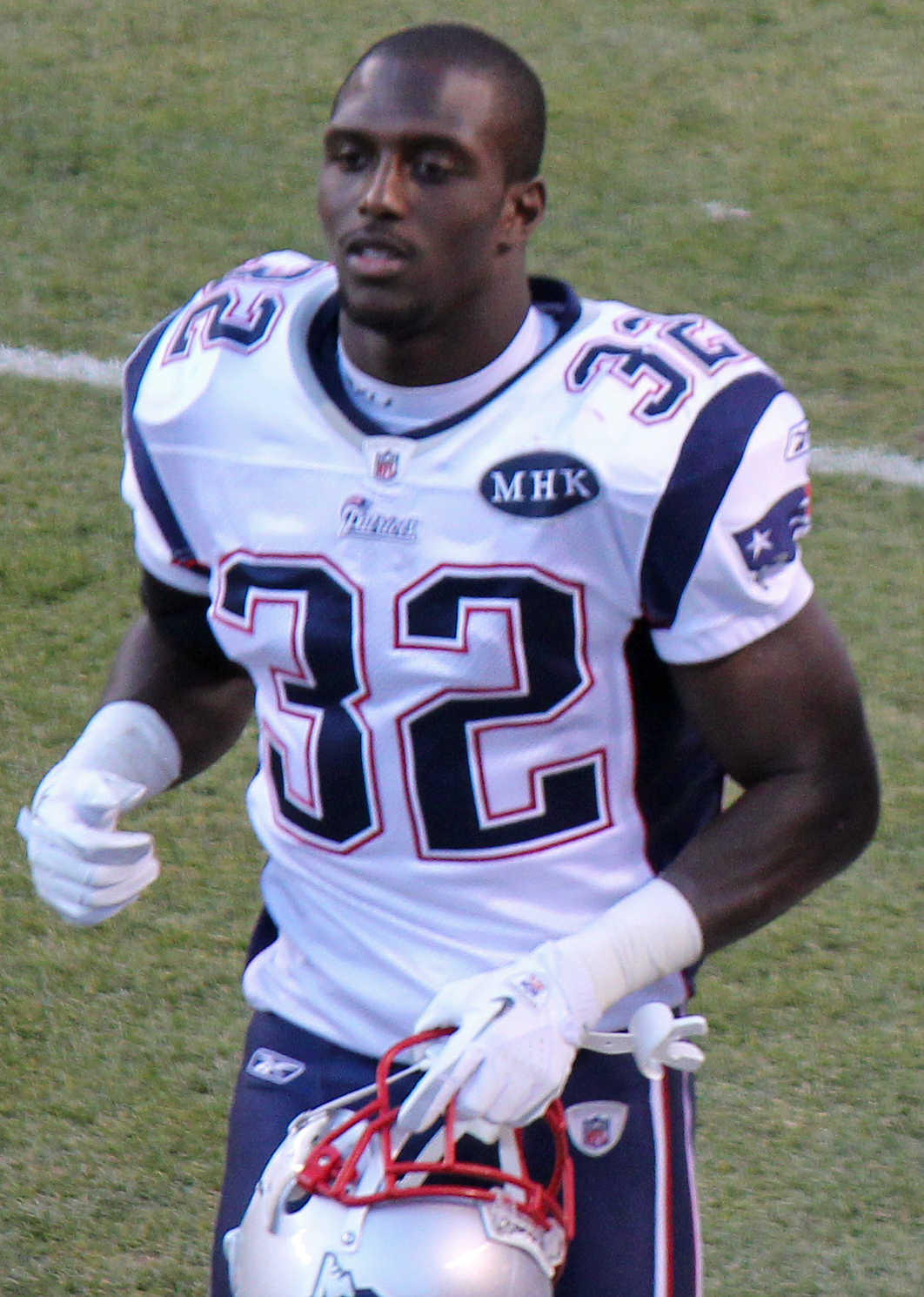
- McCourty with the New England Patriots in 2011

No. 32
- Position: Safety

Personal information
- Born: August 13, 1987 (age 39); Nyack, New York, U.S.
- Listed height: 5 ft 10 in (1.78 m)
- Listed weight: 195 lb (88 kg)

Career information
- High school: Saint Joseph Regional (Montvale, New Jersey)
- College: Rutgers (2005–2009)
- NFL draft: 2010: 1st round, 27th overall pick

Career history
- New England Patriots (2010–2022)

Awards and highlights
- 3× Super Bowl champion (XLIX, LI, LIII); 3× Second-team All-Pro (2010, 2013, 2016); 2× Pro Bowl (2010, 2016); PFWA All-Rookie Team (2010); New England Patriots All-2010s Team; New England Patriots All-Dynasty Team; First-team All-Big East (2009)

Career NFL statistics
- Total tackles: 971
- Sacks: 3.0
- Pass deflections: 110
- Interceptions: 35
- Forced fumbles: 11
- Fumble recoveries: 7
- Touchdowns: 4
- Stats at Pro Football Reference

Devin McCourty (born August 13, 1987) is an American former professional football player who was a safety in the National Football League (NFL) for 13 seasons with the New England Patriots. He played college football for the Rutgers Scarlet Knights and was selected by the Patriots in the first round of the 2010 NFL draft. Missing only five games during his Patriots career, McCourty received two Pro Bowl selections and was also a member of three Super Bowl-winning teams. McCourty also has the most postseason starts for a defensive player. His twin brother, Jason, also played in the NFL. Since leaving the NFL in 2022, he has served as a commentator for NBC's Football Night in America.

== Early life ==
McCourty attended Saint Joseph Regional High School in Montvale, New Jersey, with his twin brother, Jason McCourty. He played cornerback and free safety and was an all-league selection in his final two seasons. As a senior, he had 50 tackles and three interceptions.

Considered a two-star recruit by Rivals.com, McCourty only received one scholarship offer, from Rutgers.

== College career ==
McCourty attended Rutgers University, and played for the Rutgers Scarlet Knights football team beginning in 2005. After redshirting his first season, McCourty appeared in all 13 games as a freshman in 2006 and recorded 38 tackles and two interceptions. In 2007, McCourty and his twin brother Jason started at cornerback, with Devin compiling 63 tackles, two interceptions, one forced fumble, and three blocked kicks on special teams. He was named an All-Big East Conference academic selection in his first two seasons.

McCourty started 13 games at cornerback in his 2008 junior season, picking up 57 tackles, one interception, and a blocked punt. In his final season at Rutgers in 2009, McCourty started 13 games at cornerback, while still also working on special teams units. He had a career-high 80 tackles and also recorded one interception and 10 pass deflections. He also averaged 25.4 yards on kickoff returns and had a 98-yard kickoff return, third-longest in school history. Following the season, he was named to the All-Big East first-team.

McCourty graduated from Rutgers with a bachelor's degree in sociology.

== Professional career ==
=== Pre-draft ===
On August 25, 2009, NFL analyst Gil Brandt ranked McCourty the fourth best cornerback prospect heading into the 2010 NFL draft. He attended the NFL Scouting Combine and performed all of the combine drills. On March 10, 2010, McCourty attended Rutgers' annual pro day, but chose to stand on his combine numbers and only performed positional drills. At the conclusion of the pre-draft process, McCourty was projected to be a first- or second-round pick by NFL draft experts and scouts. He was ranked as the third-best cornerback prospect in the draft by Sports Illustrated and ESPN, the fourth-best by DraftScout.com, and the fifth-best by Bleacher Report.

External videos
- Devin McCourty's NFL Combine Workout

Pre-draft measurables
Height	Weight	Arm length	Hand span	40-yard dash	10-yard split	20-yard split	20-yard shuttle	Three-cone drill	Vertical jump	Broad jump	Bench press
5 ft 10 3/4 in (1.80 m)	193 lb (88 kg)	32 in (0.81 m)	9 in (0.23 m)	4.48 s	1.60 s	2.65 s	4.07 s	6.70 s	36 in (0.91 m)	10 ft 6 in (3.20 m)	16 reps
All values from NFL Combine.

=== 2010 ===
The New England Patriots selected McCourty in the first round (27th overall) of the 2010 NFL draft. He was the third cornerback selected in 2010 and became the highest defensive player to ever be selected in the NFL draft from Rutgers. His teammate Anthony Davis became Rutgers' highest draft pick when he was selected earlier by the San Francisco 49ers at 11th overall. This became the only time Rutgers had two first-round picks in the one NFL draft. McCourty and Davis joined 2009 first-round pick (30th overall) Kenny Britt as the only first-round picks in school history, and McCourty remains as the last occurrence of a player from Rutgers being drafted in the first round.

External videos
- Patriots draft McCourty 27th overall
- 2010 NFL Draft Vignette: Devin McCourty

On May 18, 2010, the Patriots released starting cornerback Shawn Springs following their selection of McCourty. Springs stated, "It's almost like (coach Bill Belichick) cut me, and he wants to see what he's got without distractions, He wants to give them a shot. It's hard to give them a shot when you have the presence of a guy like me around. He's going to give you all the chances not to mess it up. It helps your psyche. You don't have to compete. Just do your job. Now, you don't have to worry about the pressure of guys competing with me and messing up your confidence as a young guy, feeling like, 'How am I going to compete with this guy'.

On July 28, 2010, the New England Patriots signed McCourty to a five-year, $10 million contract that includes $7.82 million guaranteed and a signing bonus of $1.50 million.

He entered training camp as a possible candidate to become the No. 2 starting cornerback, but faced competition from Darius Butler, Terrence Wheatley, and Jonathan Wilhite. No. 1 starting cornerback Leigh Bodden was inactive for the first two preseason games, but was active in the third game against the St. Louis Rams. He would be absent for practices following the game and reportedly suffered a shoulder injury during the game. On August 31, 2010, the Patriots officially placed Bodden on injured reserve as he would have to undergo surgery for a torn rotator cuff and he would be sidelined for the entire 2010 NFL season. Head coach Bill Belichick named both McCourty and Darius Butler the starting cornerbacks to begin the regular season.

He made his professional regular season debut and first career start in the Patriots' season-opener against the Cincinnati Bengals and recorded five solo tackles and a pass deflection in their 38–24 victory. McCourty made his first career tackle on Adam Jones, ending Jones 19-yard kick return in the first quarter. On October 24, 2010, McCourty made three combined tackles, a pass deflection, and made his first career interception off a pass by quarterback Philip Rivers during a 23–20 win at the San Diego Chargers in Week 7. McCourty intercepted the pass that was originally intended for Patrick Crayton in the second quarter and was immediately tackled. On November 14, 2010, he collected a season-high 11 combined tackles (nine solo) and broke up a pass in the Patriots' 39–26 victory at the Pittsburgh Steelers in Week 10. In Week 11, he collected six combined tackles, two pass deflections, and an interception in the Patriots' 31–28 win against the Indianapolis Colts. The following week, McCourty made a season-high three pass deflections, seven combined tackles, and intercepted two passes by Matthew Stafford in a 45–24 victory at the Detroit Lions in Week 12. The feat marked his first multi-interception game of his career. On December 6, 2010, McCourty recorded three solo tackles, broke up a pass, and an interception as the Patriots routed the New York Jets 45–3 in Week 13. The interception was his sixth pick of the season and continued his three-game streak with an interception. In Week 15, he collected ten solo tackles (seven solo), a pass deflection, and made his first career sack on quarterback Matt Flynn during a 31–27 win against the Green Bay Packers. On December 29, 2010, it was announced that McCourty was voted to the 2011 Pro Bowl. He finished his rookie season in 2010 with 82 combined tackles (69 solo), 17 pass deflections, seven interceptions, two forced fumbles, and a sack in 16 games and 16 starts. His 17 pass deflections and seven interceptions marked career-highs. McCourty was named a First-team All-Pro by The Sporting News and Second-team All-Pro by the Associated Press.

The New England Patriots finished first in the AFC East with a 14–2 record and clinched home-field advantage and a first-round bye. On January 16, 2011, McCourty started in his first career playoff game and collected three solo tackles in their 28–21 loss to the Jets in the AFC Divisional Round.

=== 2011 ===
McCourty entered training camp slated as the Patriots' No. 1 starting cornerback. Head coach Bill Belichick officially named McCourty the starter, alongside Leigh Bodden, to start the regular season. On September 8, 2011, it was reported that McCourty was selected by teammates to be one of the six team captains. McCourty, Jerod Mayo, and Vince Wilfork were chosen to be defensive captains for the season.

McCourty started in the Patriots' season-opener at the Miami Dolphins and collected a season-high 11 combined tackles (ten solo) and two pass deflections in their 38–24 victory. On November 13, 2011, he made four solo tackles during 37–16 victory at the Jets, but exited in the second quarter after injuring his shoulder during a collision with teammate Sterling Moore. His shoulder injury sidelined him for the next two games (Weeks 11–12). In Week 16, McCourty collected nine combined tackles, a season-high five pass deflections, and made an interception during a 27–24 victory. He finished the 2011 season with 87 combined tackles (65 solo), 13 pass deflections, and two interceptions in 14 games and 14 starts.

The New England Patriots finished first in the AFC East with a 13–3 record. They went on to defeat the Denver Broncos 45–10 in the AFC Divisional Round and the Baltimore Ravens 23–20 in the AFC Championship to advance to the Super Bowl. On February 5, 2012, McCourty started in Super Bowl XLVI and collected seven combined tackles as the Patriots lost to the New York Giants by a score of 21–17.

=== 2012 ===
McCourty entered training camp slated as the No. 1 starting cornerback. Defensive coordinator Matt Patricia named McCourty and Kyle Arrington the starting cornerbacks to start the season, ahead of Ras-I Dowling, Will Allen, Sterling Moore, and Alfonzo Dennard. He was also named the starting kick returner by special teams coordinator Scott O'Brien. On September 6, 2012, it was announced that McCourty was selected to be a captain for the second consecutive season.

In Week 4, McCourty collected four solo tackles, two pass deflections, and intercepted two passes by quarterback Ryan Fitzpatrick during a 52–28 win at the Buffalo Bills. On October 21, 2012, McCourty made five solo tackles and returned a kick for a touchdown during a 29–26 overtime win against the Jets in Week 7. His kick return was for 104-yards and occurred in the first quarter. It became his first and only career kick return for a touchdown. His performance in Week 7 earned him AFC Special Teams Player of the Week. On November 1, 2012, the New England Patriots acquired cornerback Aqib Talib in a trade with the Tampa Bay Buccaneers. Following the trade, it was reported that McCourty would be permanently moving to free safety until moving back to cornerback in the final 2 regular season games. His move to safety was in many ways attributed to injuries to safeties Steve Gregory and Patrick Chung and the emergence of Kyle Arrington and Alfonzo Dennard as productive cornerbacks. McCourty immediately assumed the job as the starting free safety, replacing Patrick Chung, who was still recovering from a shoulder injury. On November 11, 2012, he made his debut as the starting free safety and recorded eight combined tackles, a pass deflection, and an interception in the Patriots' 37–31 win against the Bills in Week 10. McCourty finished the 2012 season with 82 combined tackles (63 solo), 13 pass deflections, five interceptions, two forced fumbles, and a touchdown in 16 games and 16 starts. He started six of the last eight regular season games at free safety (he started as a cornerback in each of the final two regular season games, and actually played either double-digit or triple-digit snaps at either slot corner or wide corner in several post-2012 seasons) and also served as the kick returner throughout the season. McCourty finished with 24 kick returns for a total of 654-yards and one touchdown. McCourty played a total of 1,329 snaps on defense and special teams. His snap total finished third in the league in 2012, behind teammates Ryan Wendell and Nate Solder.

The Patriots completed the regular season in first place in the AFC East with a 12–4 record. On January 13, 2013, McCourty made his first postseason start at safety and collected eight combined tackles during a 41–28 win against the Houston Texans in the AFC Divisional Round. The following week, he made eight combined tackles as the Patriots were eliminated from the playoffs after a 28–13 loss to the Ravens in the AFC Championship.

=== 2013 ===
McCourty began training camp as the de facto starting free safety after Patrick Chung departed in free agency. He was named the starting free safety to open the regular season, alongside strong safety Steve Gregory. McCourty was not selected as one of four team captains to begin the regular season. He became a captain, along with Rob Ninkovich, mid-season after injuries to Mayo and Wilfork.

On October 6, 2013, McCourty collected a season-high 12 combined tackles (eight solo) during a 13–6 loss at the Bengals in Week 5. In Week 9, he made six combined tackles, a pass deflection, and intercepted a pass by Ben Roethlisberger in the Patriots' 55–31 win against the Steelers. He was inactive for the Patriots' Week 17 victory against the Bills after head coach Bill Belichick chose to rest him for the playoffs. McCourty finished the season with 69 combined tackles (48 solo), nine pass deflections, and an interception in 15 games and 15 starts.

=== 2014 ===
McCourty began the regular season as the starting free safety and played alongside strong safety Patrick Chung. This began a five-year stint where McCourty and Chung were the main starting safeties for the Patriots.

In Week 2, McCourty deflected a pass and also returned an interception for a 60-yard gain before being pushed out of bounds at the goal line during a 30–7 win at the Minnesota Vikings. On November 30, 2014, McCourty collected a season-high nine combined tackles (eight solo) in the Patriots' 26–21 loss at the Packers in Week 13. He finished the season with 68 combined tackles (51 solo), six pass deflections, two interceptions, and a forced fumble in 16 games and 16 starts.

The Patriots finished atop the AFC East with a 12–4 record, clinching a first round bye and home-field advantage. On January 10, 2015, he made four combined tackles, two pass deflections, and intercepted a pass by Joe Flacco during a 35–31 victory against the Ravens in the AFC Divisional Round. The Patriots reached Super Bowl XLIX after routing the Colts 45–7 in the AFC Championship. On February 1, 2015, McCourty collected five combined tackles and helped the Patriots defeat the Seattle Seahawks 28–24 and win Super Bowl XLIX.

=== 2015 ===
McCourty became an unrestricted free agent in 2015 and received interest from multiple teams.

On March 9, 2015, the New England Patriots signed McCourty to a five-year, $47.5 million contract with $28.5 million guaranteed and a signing bonus of $15 million.

In Week 6, McCourty collected a season-high nine combined tackles during a 34–27 win at the Colts. On October 29, 2015, he made four solo tackles and sacked quarterback Ryan Tannehill in New England's 36–7 win against the Dolphins in Week 8. The sack became only the second one of his career and was his first sack since his rookie season. On December 13, 2015, McCourty made one tackle before exiting the Patriots' 27–6 victory at the Texans in the second quarter due to an ankle injury. His injury sidelined him for the next two games (Weeks 15–16). He registered 64 combined tackles (51 solo), six passes defensed, one sack, and an interception in 14 games and 14 starts.

The Patriots finished atop their division with a 12–4 record. They defeated the Kansas City Chiefs in the AFC Divisional Round, before losing to the eventual Super Bowl 50 Champions, the Broncos, in the AFC Championship. McCourty made seven combined tackles and two pass deflections throughout the playoffs with only two tackles and one deflection against the Broncos.

=== 2016 ===
On September 6, 2016, the New England Patriots announced the selection of McCourty as one of four team captains to start the regular season. It was his third consecutive selection and fifth overall.

He started in the Patriots' season-opener at the Arizona Cardinals and recorded a season-high ten combined tackles (nine solo) in their 23–21 victory. On December 12, 2016, McCourty made four solo tackles, a pass deflection, and intercepted a pass by Joe Flacco during a 30–23 win against the Ravens in Week 14. On December 20, McCourty was named to the 2017 Pro Bowl, his second time receiving the honor. He finished the season with 83 combined tackles (67 solo), seven pass deflections, an interception, and a forced fumble in 16 games and 16 starts. At the end of the season he was named second-team All-Pro. He played 1,022 defensive snaps (98%).

The Patriots finished first in their division with a 14–2 record and earned home-field advantage. On January 14, 2017, McCourty made five combined tackles, a pass deflection, and intercepted a pass during a 34–16 victory against the Texans in the AFC Divisional Round. The Patriots went on to Super Bowl LI after defeating the Steelers 36–17 in the AFC Championship. On February 5, 2017, McCourty started in Super Bowl LI and made five combined tackles as the Patriots defeated the Atlanta Falcons 34–28 in overtime.

=== 2017 ===
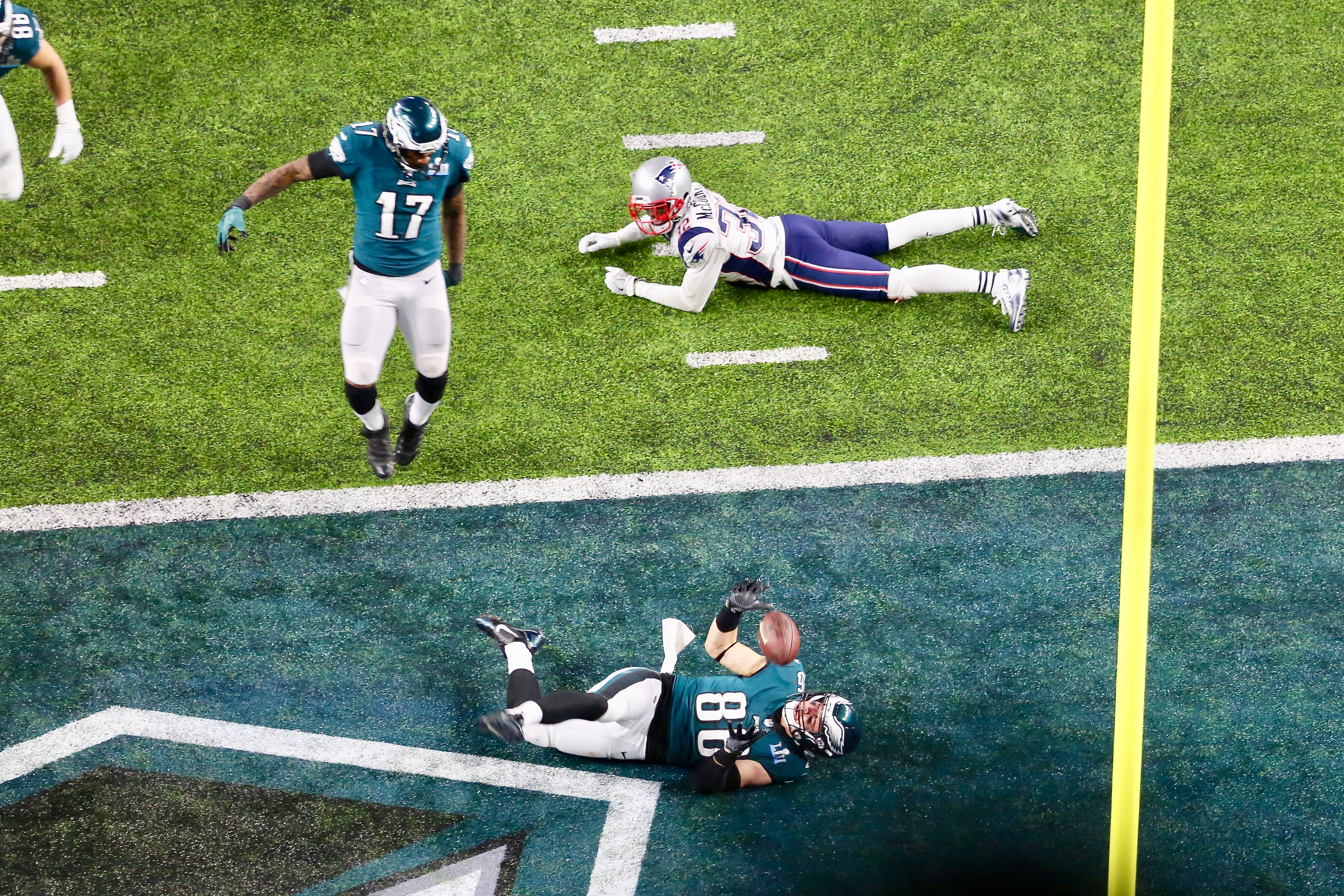
McCourty in Super Bowl LII

McCourty and Patrick Chung remained the starting safety duo with Duron Harmon acting as the third safety to begin the regular season. In Week 5, he collected a season-high 11 solo tackles during a 19–14 victory at the Buccaneers. The following week, he made five combined tackles, a pass deflection, and intercepted a pass by Josh McCown in the Patriots' 24–17 victory at the Jets in Week 6. On December 11, 2017, McCourty collected seven solo tackles and sacked quarterback Jay Cutler during a 27–20 loss at the Dolphins. The sack became his third of his career. McCourty finished the season with a career-high 97 combined tackles (80 solo), five pass deflections, an interception, and a sack in 16 games and 16 starts.

The Patriots finished first in the AFC East with a 13–3 record and received a first round bye and home-field advantage. They defeated the Tennessee Titans in the AFC Divisional Round and the Jacksonville Jaguars in the AFC Championship. On February 4, 2018, McCourty started in Super Bowl LII and collected seven combined tackles and two pass deflections in the Patriots' 41–33 loss to the Philadelphia Eagles.

=== 2018 ===
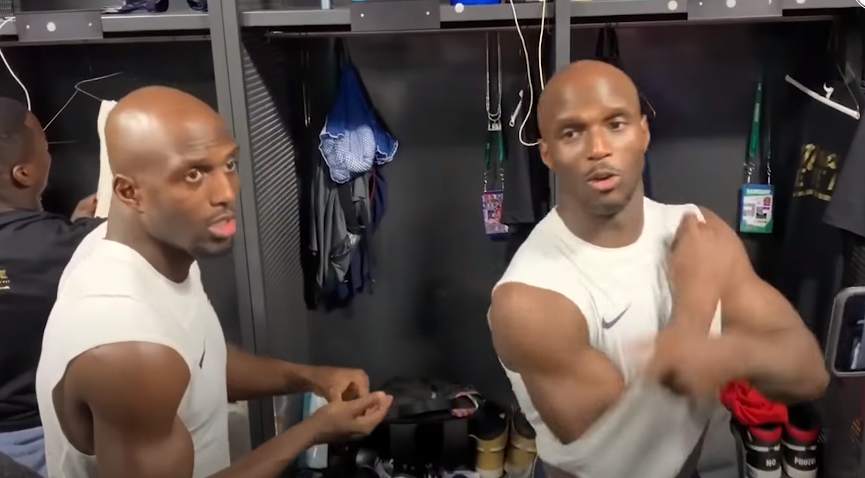
Devin with his twin Jason after winning Super Bowl LIII

In the preseason, Devin McCourty was reunited with his brother Jason, who played as cornerback for the Titans from 2009 to 2016 and the winless Cleveland Browns in 2017. Jason started as the number two cornerback in New England's secondary and formed a strong duo with All-Pro corner Stephon Gilmore. In Week 8 against the Bills, McCourty had his only interception of the season, an 84-yard pick six off Derek Anderson as the Patriots won the game 25–6. According to ESPN, McCourty reached a speed of 22.05 miles per hour on the play, the fastest speed recorded on a touchdown that season. In the 2018 season, McCourty finished with 82 total tackles (59 solo), one interception, four passes defended, and one forced fumble.

McCourty helped the Patriots win Super Bowl LIII over the Los Angeles Rams; he and his brother became the first twins to play in the same Super Bowl. He was ranked 89th by his fellow players on the NFL Top 100 Players of 2019.

=== 2019 ===
In Week 1 against the Steelers, McCourty made his first interception of the season off Ben Roethlisberger in the endzone during the 33–3 win. In Week 2 against the Dolphins, McCourty had his second interception of the season off of Ryan Fitzpatrick in the 43–0 win. In Week 3 against the Jets, McCourty recorded his third interception of the season off Luke Falk in the 30–14 win. In Week 4 against the Bills, McCourty intercepted his fourth pass of the season off Josh Allen in the 16–10 win. McCourty became the first player to record four interceptions in a season's first four games since Vikings' safety Brian Russell accomplished this feat in the 2003 season. He was named AFC Defensive Player of the Month for September. In Week 7 against the Jets, McCourty recorded his fifth interception of the season off Sam Darnold in the 33–0 win. In Week 8 against the Browns, McCourty recovered a fumble forced by teammate Jonathan Jones on Nick Chubb in the 27–13 win. In Week 14 against the Chiefs, McCourty forced a fumble on tight end Travis Kelce which was recovered by teammate Stephon Gilmore during the 23–16 loss. He finished the 2019 season with 58 total tackles (46 solo), five interceptions, seven passes defended, and two forced fumbles.

=== 2020 ===
On March 17, 2020, McCourty signed a two-year, $23 million contract extension to stay with the Patriots.

In Week 2 against the Seahawks on Sunday Night Football, McCourty recorded his first interception of the season off a pass thrown by Russell Wilson and returned it for a 43-yard touchdown during the 35–30 loss. This was McCourty's second career pick six. In Week 13 against the Los Angeles Chargers, McCourty returned a field goal blocked by teammate Cody Davis for a 44-yard touchdown during the 45–0 win. He finished the 2020 season with 68 total tackles (45 solo), two interceptions, and six passes defended. He started in all 16 games.

=== 2021 ===
In the 2021 season, McCourty started in all 17 games. He finished with 60 total tackles (42 solo), three interceptions, and ten passes defended.

=== 2022 ===
On March 13, 2022, McCourty signed a one-year, $9 million contract extension with the Patriots.

On December 1, 2022, McCourty became just the fourth defensive back in NFL history to have 200 starts with a single-team (after Ken Riley, Darrell Green, and Ronde Barber), in addition to being the 24th overall player to have 200 starts with a single-team. In his final season, McCourty finished with 71 total tackles (54 solo), four interceptions, and eight passes defended in 17 starts.

=== Retirement ===
Following his 13th season, McCourty announced his retirement on March 10, 2023.

== Career statistics ==
Legend
	Won the Super Bowl
**Bold**	Career high

=== NFL ===
Year	Team	Games		Tackles				Interceptions						Fumbles			
Year	Team	GP	GS	Cmb	Solo	Ast	Sck	Int	Yds	Avg	Lng	TD	PD	FF	FR	Yds	TD
2010	NE	16	16	82	69	13	**1.0**	**7**	**110**	15.7	50	0	**17**	**2**	0	0	0
2011	NE	14	14	87	65	22	0.0	2	38	19.0	38	0	13	0	0	0	0
2012	NE	16	16	82	63	19	0.0	5	53	10.6	3	0	13	**2**	0	0	0
2013	NE	15	15	69	48	21	0.0	1	0	0.0	0	0	9	**2**	1	**44**	0
2014	NE	16	16	68	51	17	0.0	2	70	35.0	60	0	6	1	0	0	0
2015	NE	14	14	64	51	13	**1.0**	1	27	27.0	27	0	5	0	0	0	0
2016	NE	16	16	83	67	16	0.0	1	0	0.0	0	0	7	1	1	3	0
2017	NE	16	16	**97**	**80**	17	**1.0**	1	0	0.0	0	0	5	0	1	0	0
2018	NE	16	16	82	59	**23**	0.0	1	84	**84.0**	**84T**	**1**	4	1	**2**	14	0
2019	NE	16	16	58	46	12	0.0	5	49	9.8	24	0	7	**2**	1	0	0
2020	NE	16	16	68	45	**23**	0.0	2	62	31.0	43	**1**	6	0	0	0	0
2021	NE	17	17	60	42	18	0.0	3	22	7.3	22	0	10	0	0	0	0
2022	NE	17	17	71	54	17	0.0	4	66	16.5	36	0	8	0	1	0	0
Career		205	205	971	740	231	3.0	35	581	16.6	84	2	110	11	7	61	0

=== College ===
Season	Team	Games		Tackles				Interceptions			
Season	Team	GP	GS	Cmb	Solo	Ast	Sck	Int	Yds	Avg	TD
2005	Rutgers	Redshirt									
2006	Rutgers	13	13	38	23	15	**0.5**	**2**	**69**	**34.5**	**1**
2007	Rutgers	13	13	63	40	23	**0.5**	**2**	36	18.0	**1**
2008	Rutgers	13	13	57	37	20	0.0	1	0	0.0	0
2009	Rutgers	13	13	**80**	**49**	**31**	0.0	1	0	0.0	0
Career		52	52	238	149	89	1.0	6	105	17.5	2

== Personal life ==
McCourty was raised in Nyack, New York, by his parents Phyllis and Calvin McCourty. His father died in 1990 at age 34 due to a heart attack related to complications from asthma. Devin has a twin brother, Jason, and an older brother named Larry White. He was born 27 minutes before Jason, each weighing six pounds and 13 ounces. During junior high school, the family moved into a mobile home in Nanuet, New York. In 2010, his mother retired from her career as a nurse at Rockland Psychiatric Hospital in Orangeburg, New York. McCourty is of Jamaican descent.

His twin brother Jason also played cornerback for Rutgers. Jason was selected in the sixth round of the 2009 NFL draft by the Tennessee Titans and previously played for the Cleveland Browns. On March 15, 2018, the Cleveland Browns traded Jason to the New England Patriots along with a 2018 seventh-round pick for New England's 2018 sixth-round pick. Devin and Jason are one of only 13 sets of twins in NFL history and are one of five active sets of twins to currently play as of 2016, along with Shaquill Griffin/Shaquem Griffin, Brandon Dixon/Brian Dixon, Maurkice Pouncey/Mike Pouncey, and previous teammates Jacob Hollister/Cody Hollister. They were the first set to play in a Super Bowl together in helping the Patriots win Super Bowl LIII.

Devin and Jason jointly delivered the 2019 commencement address at Rutgers; they also received honorary doctorates from their alma mater. They share a Twitter account and co-host a podcast, Double Coverage with the McCourty Twins. Devin also serves on the board of Boston Medical Center.

In 2016, he married his girlfriend Michelle Powell. On March 11, 2017, the couple had a baby girl named Londyn and on April 29, 2018, they had a baby boy named Brayden.

=== Philanthropy ===
In the aftermath of the Boston Marathon bombing, McCourty made a pledge to aid recovery efforts with a donation of $100 for every tackle he made during the 2013 season, and $200 per interception. The pledge follows a similar offer by former Patriots wide receiver Danny Amendola ($100 per reception, $200 per dropped pass).

In January 2018, McCourty, along with the punk band the Dropkick Murphys, joined in a raffle raising money for the Dropkick Murphys' The Claddagh Fund and McCourty's Embrace the Kids Foundation. The grand prize included a trip and tickets to Super Bowl LII in which McCourty's Patriots played.
