= Saint Joseph Regional High School =

Catholic high school in Montvale, New Jersey, US

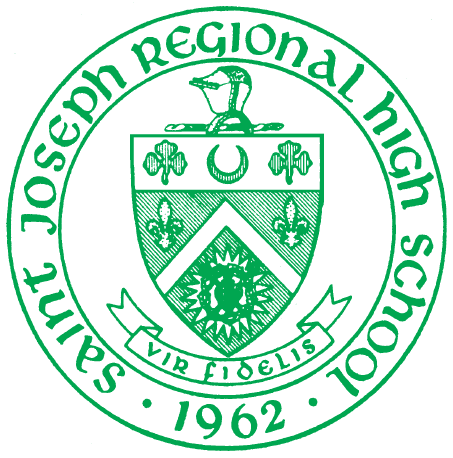

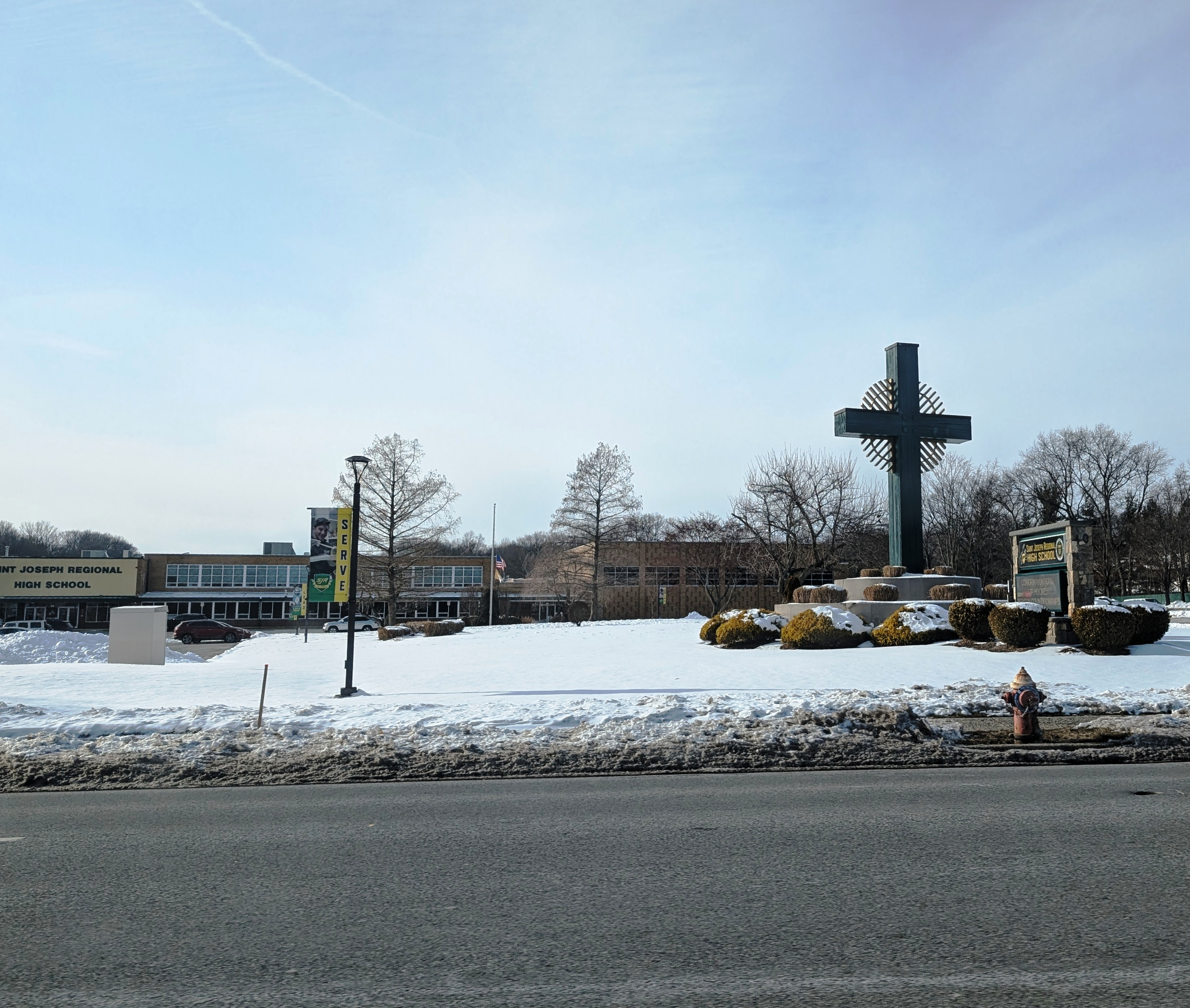
- Saint Joseph's in 2025

Location
- 40 Chestnut Ridge Road; Montvale, Bergen County, New Jersey 07645; United States; 41.049923°N 74.071219°W

Information
- Type: Private, All-Boys
- Motto: Vir Fidelis (The Faithful Man)
- Religious affiliation: Catholic
- Patron saint: St. Joseph
- Established: 1962
- Status: Open
- Oversight: Archdiocese of Newark
- NCES School ID: 00862085
- President: Reginald Sainte-Rose, SJR '92
- Principal: Michael Stone
- Faculty: 33.0 FTEs
- Grades: 9–12
- Enrollment: 465 (as of 2023–24)
- Student to teacher ratio: 14.1:1
- Campus: Urban fringe of large metro area
- Campus size: ~35 acres (14 ha)
- Colors: Dark green Old gold
- Athletics conference: Big North Conference (general); North Jersey Super Football Conference (football)
- Mascot: The Green Knight
- Nickname: Joe's, St. Joes, SJR
- Team name: Green Knights
- Rival: Bergen Catholic High School; Don Bosco Preparatory High School
- Accreditation: Middle States Association of Colleges and Schools
- Newspaper: The Guardian
- Yearbook: Aegis
- Tuition: $19,900 (2026–27)
- Website: saintjosephregional.org
- A view of SJR from above

Saint Joseph Regional High School (known as SJR, St. Joe's or Joe's) is a private, Catholic, college preparatory school for boys, located on a 33-acre (130,000 m^{2}) campus in Montvale, in Bergen County, in the U.S. state of New Jersey. The school operates under the auspices of the Archdiocese of Newark. St. Joseph Regional High School was founded in 1962 by the Brothers of Saint Francis Xavier. The school has been accredited by the Middle States Association of Colleges and Schools Commission on Elementary and Secondary Schools since 1968.

As of the 2023–24 school year, the school had an enrollment of 465 students and 33 classroom teachers (on an FTE basis), for a student–teacher ratio of 14.1:1. The school's student body was 57.0% (265) White, 23.0% (107) Hispanic, 14.4% (67) Black, 3.9% (18) two or more races and 1.7% (8) Asian. In 2014, St. Joseph Regional High School graduated its 7,000th student.

The St. Joseph curriculum includes honors and Advanced Placement courses, and has college credit courses available through Saint Peter's University in Jersey City, New Jersey.

== History ==
During its first year, Saint Joseph Regional High School held classes at Our Lady of Mercy School in Park Ridge while its Montvale campus was under construction. The school was dedicated on September 4, 1963, and its first class graduated in June 1966.

== Academics ==
Saint Joseph Regional offers courses in English, world/US history, science, foreign language, mathematics, theology, and a number of electives, most with accelerated and honor levels. The school offers a number of Advanced Placement and college-level courses. A Virtual High School program provides an opportunity for qualified students to take courses online through an educational consortium endorsed by the United States Department of Education. Students can take classes as diverse as Spanish Italian and Robotics.{{https://www.saintjosephregional.org/academics/technology|date=April 2026}}

Students may apply to the National Honor Society, Spanish National Honor Society, and Tri-M Music Honor Society.

== Athletics ==
The Saint Joseph Regional High School Green Knights participate in the United Division of the Big North Conference, a super conference composed of public and private high schools in Bergen and Passaic counties that was established as part of a realignment of sports leagues in Northern New Jersey and operates under the supervision of the New Jersey State Interscholastic Athletic Association. The school had temporarily competed in the North Jersey Tri-County Conference in 2009–10, which was set up to operate on an interim basis while new conferences were established. Until the NJSIAA's 2009 realignment, the school had participated in Division C of the Northern New Jersey Interscholastic League, which included high schools located in Bergen, Essex and Passaic counties, and was separated into three divisions based on NJSIAA size classification. With 772 students in grades 10-12, the school was classified by the NJSIAA for the 2019–20 school year as Non-Public A for most athletic competition purposes, which included schools with an enrollment of 381 to 1,454 students in that grade range (equivalent to Group II for public schools). The football team competes in the United Red division of the North Jersey Super Football Conference, which includes 112 schools competing in 20 divisions, making it the nation's biggest football-only high school sports league. The school was classified by the NJSIAA as Non-Public Group A (equivalent to Group III/IV/V for public schools) for football for 2024–2026, which included schools with 738 to 1,404 students.

The Green Knights have achieved league, county and state titles in football, baseball, basketball, wrestling, golf, ice hockey, and winter and spring track and field athletics in the last two decades. The Green Knights' rivals include Bergen Catholic High School, Don Bosco Preparatory High School and Paramus Catholic High School.

Fall sports

SJR varsity fall sports include football, cross country, and soccer.

Long considered a regional powerhouse, SJR football has grown to become one of the best high school football programs in the country. The football team won the NJSIAA state sectional championships 1987 and 1988 (Non-Public A North), 1995 and 1996 (Non-Public Group III), 1997 (Non-Public Group IV), 1999–2005, 2008, 2009, 2011–2013 and 2016 (Non-Public Group III), and 2018 (Non-Public Group IV), and 2025 (Non-Public Group A). The SJR varsity football team had a streak of seven Non-Public Group III titles through the 2005 season, a run ended with a 35-28 loss to Holy Cross High School on a touchdown scored in the final minute of the first round of the 2006 playoffs. The football team has also had its share of national rankings by USA Today, including #8 in 1995, #11 in 1997, #7 in 1999, and #23 in 2004. SJR has also been ranked #1 in the state in 1995, 1997, and 1999. Other teams have been listed in the nation's top 25 rankings during various parts of the year. SJR was ranked No. 11 in the nation in the final High School Football America Top 25 in 2013. In 2015, the team finished No. 19 nationally in the High School Football America Top 50. SJR has received The Star-Ledger Trophy in 1995, 1997, and 1999, 2012 and 2013, recognizing the team as the #1 football team in New Jersey. A 7-0 win by the 1987 team against Bergen Catholic High School in the playoff finals gave the team the Parochial A North state sectional title and a 9-2 record for the season. The 1988 team finished the season with a 10-1 record after winning the Non-Public A North sectional title after a 29-18 victory against Delbarton School in the championship game. A 32-26 win in the 1995 Parochial Group III championship game at Giants Stadium against DePaul Catholic High School gave the team an 11-0 record for the season. The team won the 2000 Parochial Group III title in 2000 with a 54-29 win against Pope John XXIII Regional High School in the finals. The 2001 team won the Parochial Group III title with a 17-9 victory in the tournament final against Immaculata High School. The 2008 team finished with an 11–1 record and won against Immaculate by a score of 27–6 in the Non-Public Group III state championship game. The 2009 varsity football team defeated Immaculata again in the state championship 14–0. Saint Joe's beat Delbarton School 45–22 in the 2011 Non-Public Group III title game played at Kean University to earn its 15th state championship title. In 2013, the Green Knights defeated Pope John XXIII, 62–14; it was the fifth in sixth seasons for SJR. In 2016, the program won its 18th state title, winning the Non-Public Group III state sectional championship by a score of 26–17 against DePaul Catholic High School in the tournament final. The team won the Non-Public Group IV title, the program's first in Group IV, with a 13-0 win against Bergen Catholic High School. The 2025 team finished with a 10-2 record and was ranked first in the SI New Jersey Top 25 rankings after winning the program's 20th state title against Don Bosco Preparatory High School by a score of 24-21 in the Non-Public Group A championship game. The rivalry with Don Bosco was listed at 15th on NJ.com's 2017 list "Ranking the 31 fiercest rivalries in N.J. HS football". Don Bosco leads the rivalry with a 30–23 overall record as of 2017, which includes periods in the 1990s and 2010s when the two schools played each other on Thanksgiving. The school's rivalry with Bergen Catholic was listed at 14th, with Bergen Catholic leading with a 31–17 overall record.

Winter sports

SJR offers five varsity winter sports: basketball, bowling, ice hockey, wrestling, and winter track. The SJR basketball team has won a sectional championship; three county championships, most recently in 2005; and five league championships, most recently in 2005, 2007, and in 2009, where they beat Teaneck High School by a score of 63–50, less than 48 hours after losing to them in the County Jamboree finals 55–53 and ended their season with a record of 16–2 in the NNJIL. In 2005, the SJR basketball team were state finalists, but lost to Seton Hall Preparatory School 63–54 in the Non-Public North A state sectional tournament.

SJR wrestling has been a long dominant force in northern New Jersey and was inducted into the New Jersey Wrestling Hall of Fame in 2005. The team won the Parochial A North state sectional title in 1986, 1988, 1993, 1997, 1998, 1999, 2023, 2024, and 2025, and the Parochial B North title in 1996. The team won the Parochial A state championship in 1993, 1997, 1998, 2023, and 2025, and the Parochial B title in 1996.

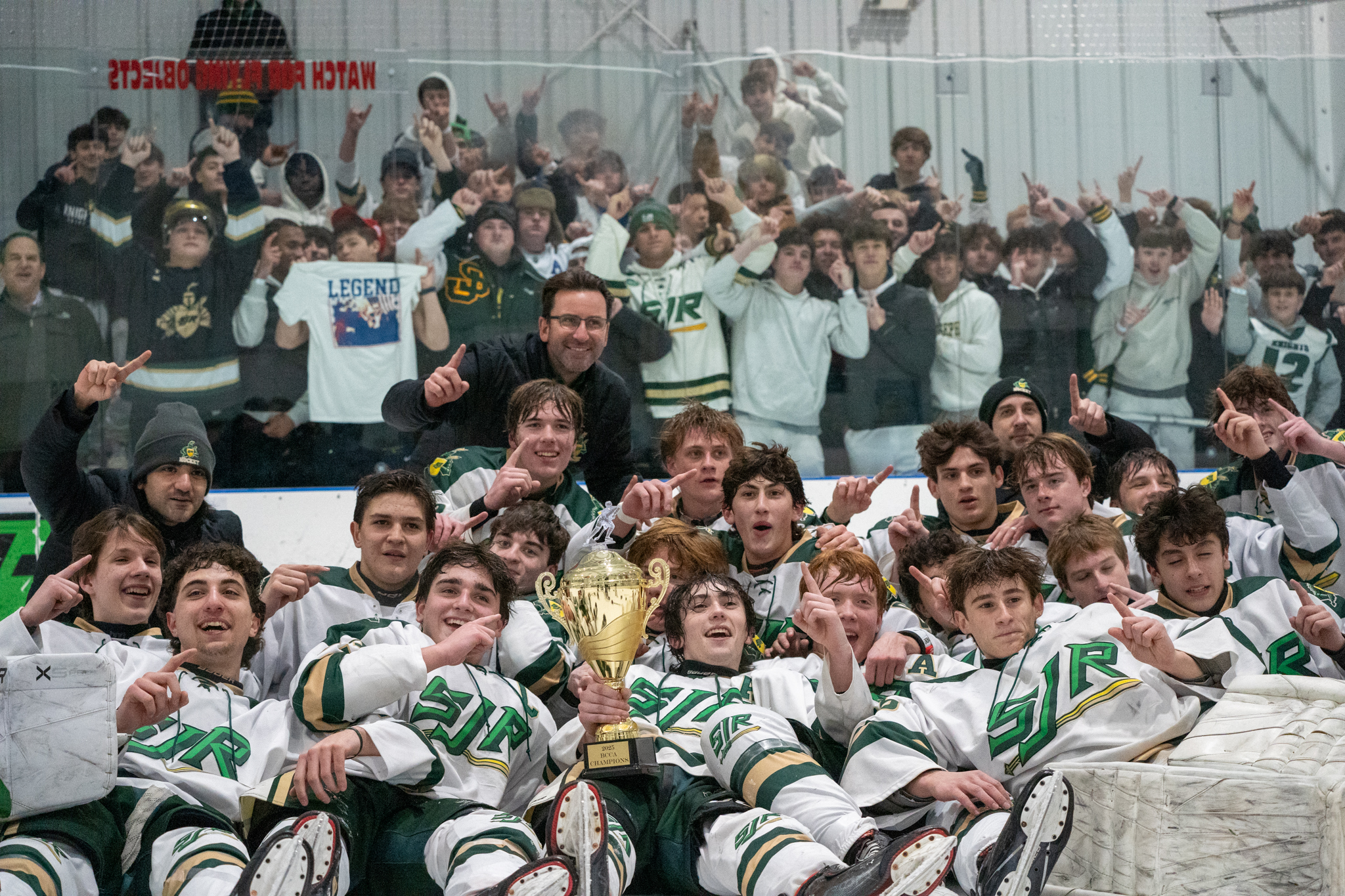
St. Joe's hockey wins Bergen County tournament 2025

The ice hockey team was the state champion in 1984, 1985 and 1991, and won the Gordon Cup in 1986, 1990 and 1992. In 2010, SJR hockey, who entered the NJTCC Cup as the lowest seed, upset top-seeded Passaic Valley High School and DePaul en route to the championship on February 28. In 2011, the Green Knight Hockey team defeated Hackensack in the first round 6–3, and then defeated Ramapo High School by a score of 2-1 before losing 2–0 to second-seeded Wayne Valley High School in the finals. In the winter of 2013, the SJR Ice Hockey team won their fourth league championship appearance in a row. In 2015, the team reached the state quarterfinals after upsetting the #2 ranked Don Bosco Preparatory High School in the Round of 32. The Green Knight Hockey Team reached the state quarterfinals once again in 2016, losing to Pope John XXIII Regional High School in overtime. The team will rejoin the Gordon Conference after spending nearly two decades in the Big North Conference. In 2025, the team won their first Bergen County championship after defeating Don Bosco Preparatory High School by a score of 2–0 in the tournament final. That year they were ranked the #3 team in the state of New Jersey rankings by NJ.com making the highest ranking ever in school history.

Spring sports

SJR offers five varsity spring sports including baseball, golf, lacrosse, tennis, and track and field.

The tennis team won the Non-Public North state championship in 1970 (against runner-up Seton Hall Preparatory School in the final match of the tournament), 1971 (vs. Christian Brothers Academy) and 1972 (vs. Mater Dei High School).

The baseball team won the Non-Public A state championship in 1993 (defeating Notre Dame High School in the tournament finals), 1998 (vs. Eustace Preparatory School) 2004 (vs. Holy Cross Academy) and 2021 (vs. St. Augustine Preparatory School). SJR baseball won the NNJIL championship twelve times: in 1984, 1986, 1988, 1992, 1995, 1998-2003, and 2005, and won the county tournament in 1984, 1986, 1988, 1998, 2002, 2003, 2005, 2009, 2013, 2016, and 2024. The 1998 team won the Group A title with 2-1 win against Bishop Eustace in the championship game. The 2009 SJR varsity squad won the county tournament by defeating Ramapo High School 10–0. The 2009 squad was also a state finalist after a 7–6 victory over nationally ranked Don Bosco Preparatory High School, but lost to Delbarton School 4–3. Despite the loss, the team was ranked #5 in the state, and #1 in the county. SJR baseball has also had its share of state and national rankings by USA Today, achieving #1 in Northern New Jersey in 2002, 2003, 2005 and 2009, #1 in New Jersey in 2005, #10 in the country in 1998, #1 in the east in 1998, #9 in the east in 2004, and is currently ranked #6 in the east in the 2009 season. St. Joe's has had a long-lasting rivalry in baseball with Don Bosco Prep.

The spring / outdoor track team won the Non-Public A state championship in 1968 and 1969.

== Theater program ==
SJR's theater program presents a musical in the fall/winter, and a drama or comedy in the spring. SJR students also perform in productions put on by Immaculate Heart Academy and Academy of the Holy Angels.

=== 2005–06 ===
In 2006, SJR presented the world high school premiere of Miss Saigon. It was nominated for multiple awards in the 10th Annual Drama Festival at Fairleigh Dickinson University, as well as the Helen Hayes Theater Awards, and the Paper Mill Playhouse Rising Star Awards.

Awards won at FDU include:

- Best Supporting Actor in a Musical
- Best Supporting Actress in a Musical
- Best Ensemble
- Best Overall Musical

Helen Hayes awards include:

- Best Performance by an Actress in a Leading Role
- Best Scenic Effect – St. Joe's "The Chopper"
- Best Lobby Display

=== 2006–07 ===
In October 2006, SJR presented Urinetown: The Musical.

Metropolitan HS Theater Awards:

- Best Overall High School Musical

Helen Hayes Theater Awards:

- Best Overall Production of a Musical

Paper Mill Rising Star Awards:

- Educational Impact Award

=== 2007–08 ===
In 2008, SJR presented West Side Story and The Crucible. Their production of West Side had seven final nominations for the Helen Hayes Theater Awards, and four final nominations for the Paper Mill Rising Star Awards. West Side Story also received the 2008 Showstopper Runner-Up Award for best musical in the country by USA Weekend.

West Side Story Awards

Helen Hayes Theater Awards include:

- Best Actor in a Dramatic Role - Ryan Mati
- Best Performance by an Ensemble Group - The Jets
- Outstanding Achievement in Scenic Design

Paper Mill Rising Star Awards include:

- Best Actress in a Supporting Role - Alliy Drago
- Educational Impact Award

The Crucible Awards

Montclair State University's Drama Awards:

- Best Overall High School Drama in New Jersey

=== 2008–09 ===
The 2009 musical was The Who's Tommy and Lend Me a Tenor. For Tommy, SJR received seven final nominations from the Metropolitan High School Theater Awards, formerly known as the Helen Hayes Youth Theater Awards, and three final nominations from the Paper Mill Rising Star Awards.

On January 28, 2009, Fox 5 News aired a special on the senior citizens production of SJR's Tommy, which aired on Good Day New York. The special included interviews of cast members, and clips of the cast performing on stage.

The Who's Tommy Awards

Metropolitan High School Theater Award (Helen Hayes Youth Theater Awards):

- Outstanding Stage Crew

Paper Mill Rising Star Award:

- Educational Impact Award

Lend Me a Tenor Awards

Montclair State University's Drama Awards:

- Best Overall High School Comedy in New Jersey

=== 2009–10 ===
In 2010, SJR presented Curtains and A Few Good Men.

Curtains Awards

Metropolitan HS Theater Awards:

- Best Overall High School Musical

Papermill Rising Star Awards:

- Most Educational Impact of a Musical

A Few Good Men Awards

Montclair State University's Drama Awards:

- Best Overall High School Play in New Jersey

=== 2010–11 ===
In 2011, the musical presented was Les Misérables while their drama was Is He Dead?

Les Misérables Awards

Metropolitan HS Theater Awards:

- Best Supporting Actor - Taylor Popilelarz

Is He Dead? Awards

Montclair State University's Drama Awards:

- Best Lead Actor In a Drama - Tony Antoniou

=== 2011–12 ===
In 2012, SJR presented Cabaret and One Flew Over The Cuckoo's Nest.

Cabaret Awards

Papermill Rising Star Awards:

- Most Educational Impact

=== 2012–13 ===
In 2013, SJR presented Dirty Rotten Scoundrels SJR presented Noises Off as their spring drama, garnering a number of MSU Theatre Night Award nominations, and two wins.

Noises Off Awards

Montclair State University's Drama Awards

- Outstanding Performance by a Supporting Actress in a Comedy - Delaney Moro
- Outstanding Performance by Supporting Actor in a Comedy - Dan Gettler

=== 2013–14 ===
In 2014, SJR presented Fiddler on the Roof as their winter musical. SJR presented Brighton Beach Memoirs as their spring drama, garnering 11 Montclair Theatre Night Award Nominations, including Best Overall Production, and two wins.

Fiddler on The Roof Awards

Metropolitan HS Theater Award:

- Outstanding Instrumentalist - Violin - Paul Koonaporn

Brighton Beach Memoirs Awards

- Outstanding Performance by a Supporting Actress in a Comedy - Victoria Duffy
- Outstanding Performance by a Leading Actress in a Comedy - Chloe Troast

=== 2014–15 ===
In 2015, SJR presented Miss Saigon, which earned a Paper Mill Rising Star Award. They also did You Can't Take It With You as their comedy.

Miss Saigon Awards

Paper Mill Rising Star Awards:

- Outstanding Actor for a Performance in a Leading Role - Nick Berninger

You Can't Take It With You Awards

Montclair State University's Drama Awards:

- Best Overall High School Comedy in New Jersey
- Best Scenic Design

=== 2015–16 ===
In 2016, SJR once again presented Urinetown, and Ordinary People.

Urinetown Awards

Papermill Rising Star Awards:

- Most Educational Impact

Metropolitan High School Theater Awards:

- Best Overall Lobby Design

Ordinary People Awards

Montclair State University's Drama Awards

- Best Lead Actor In a Drama - Christopher Marzulla

=== 2017–18 ===
In 2017, SJR presented West Side Story and Rumors.

Rumors Awards

- Best Actor in a Comedy - James Zitelli

=== 2018–19 ===
In 2018, SJR presented Curtains and The 25th Annual Putnam County Spelling Bee

=== 2019–20 ===
In 2019, SJR presented Bright Star.

=== 2020–21 ===
In 2020, SJR presented The Addams Family

=== 2021–22 ===
In 2021, SJR presented Something Rotten!

Something Rotten Awards

Montclair State University's Drama Awards:

- Outstanding High School Musical
- Outstanding High School Actor - Brendan Moran

=== 2022 ===
In 2022, SJR presented the world premiere of the musical adaption of the movie Mystic Pizza. The production was featured on FOX5's Good Day New York with interviews of the cast and clips from the show featured.

=== 2022–23 ===
SJR presented Into The Woods as their Winter musical and Clue as their Spring play.

=== 2023–24 ===
In 2023, SJR did a student-directed production of the play Twelve Angry Men. In the winter, they performed Les Misérables. This performance won "Best Overall Musical" at the Metropolitan High School Theater Awards.

In the spring of 2024, SJR presented A Chorus Line.

=== 2024–25 ===
In 2024, SJR performed the student-directed All In The Timing. In the winter, they performed Footloose, which was nominated for "Best Overall Musical" at the Metropolitan High School Theater Awards.

In the spring of 2025, they presented Rumors.

=== 2025-26 ===
In 2025, SJR presented the student-directed, Is He Dead? In the winter, they presented Pippin. Their production of Pippin took home five Metropolitan High School Theatre Awards (Metro's) including "Best Overall musical".

== WSJR ==
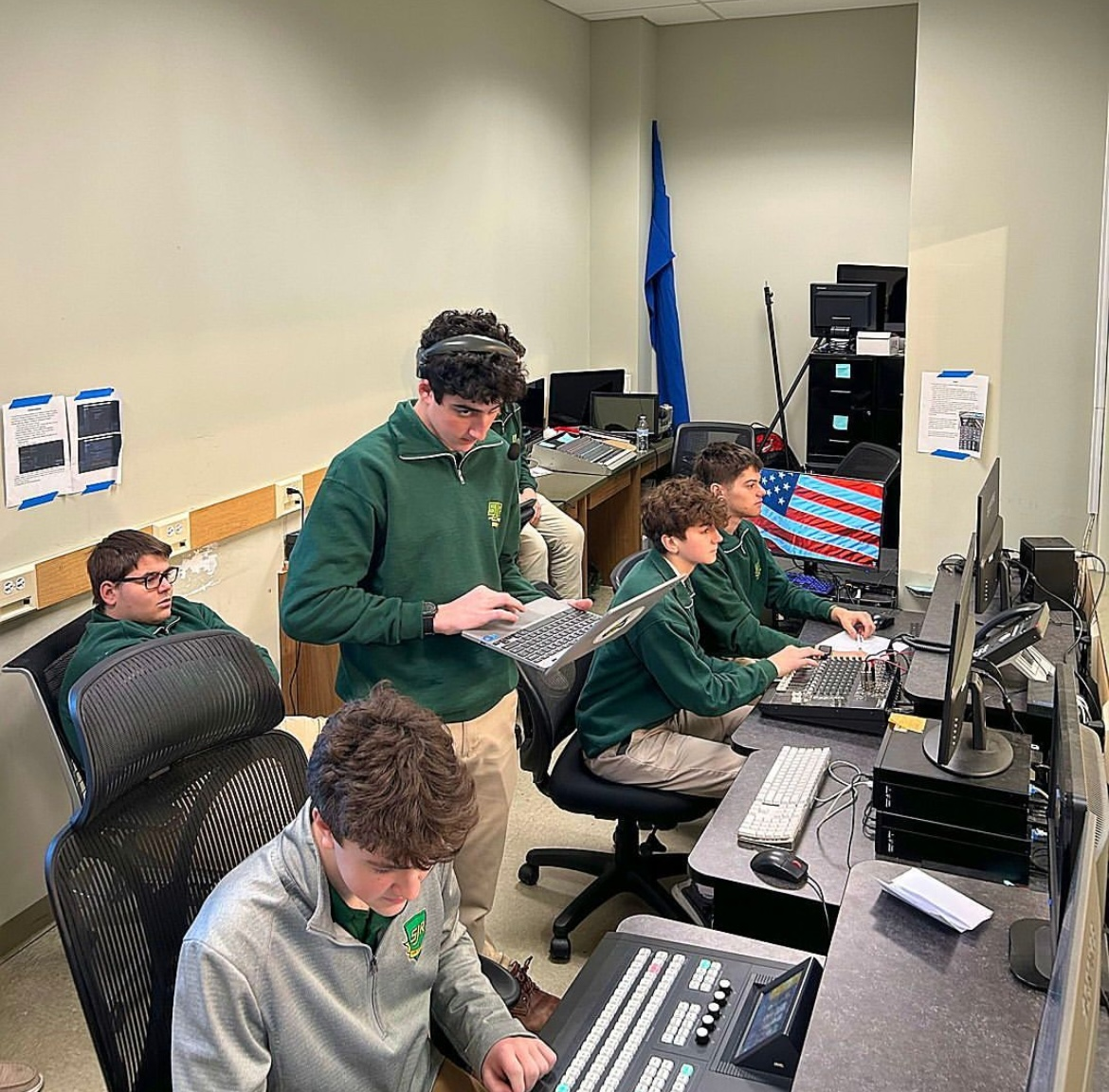
Members of WSJR-tv put on an amazing show behind the scenes.

WSJR in action, with supervisor Mr. Salvati

WSJR was re-launched by members of the Class of 2023 during the 2022-2023 school year after being shut down due to Covid. Its first official broadcast was on the first day of school in September of 2023. Every day students are the hosts, executive producers, technical producers, and reporters on the show, which is broadcast on YouTube every morning.

St. Joes has a TV studio, WSJR. It is live streamed on Youtube every school day from 8:10am to 8:17am. WSJR generally has students as anchors, and broadcasts school announcements and sport results (school and pro).

== Notable alumni ==
- Steve Beauharnais (born 1990), linebacker for New England Patriots
- Phillip Chorba (born 1983), actor in Silver Linings Playbook and Concussion
- Vinny Ciurciu (born 1980), former linebacker for the Detroit Lions, Minnesota Vikings, New England Patriots and Tampa Bay Buccaneers
- Howard Cross III (born 2001), American football nose tackle for the Cleveland Browns
- Audric Estimé (born 2003), American football running back for the New Orleans Saints
- John Flaherty (born 1967), Major League Baseball catcher 1992–2005 who has been a commentator for the YES Network
- Junior Galette (born 1988), former linebacker who played in the NFL for the Washington Redskins and the New Orleans Saints
- Joe Giles-Harris (born 1997), American football linebacker who plays for the Buffalo Bills
- Ron Girault (born 1986), safety who played for the Las Vegas Locomotives of the United Football League
- Andrew Giuliani (born 1986), Special Assistant to the President and Associate Director of the Office of Public Liaison for President Donald Trump
- Augie Hoffmann (born 1981), guard for the New Orleans Saints now the offensive line coach for Rutgers
- Ralph Jodice (born 1955), retired United States Air Force Lieutenant General
- Rob Kaminsky (born 1994), pitcher drafted by the St. Louis Cardinals in first round of 2013 MLB draft, made his major league debut for the Cardinals in 2020
- Garry Kitchen (born 1955), video game designer, programmer and executive best known for his work at Activision during the early years of the company's history
- Patrick Kivlehan (born 1989), former MLB outfielder who played for the Toronto Blue Jays
- Tommy La Stella (born 1989) second baseman for the Los Angeles Angels
- Artie Lewicki (born 1992), MLB pitcher for the Detroit Tigers
- Justyn-Henry Malloy (born 2000), professional baseball player for the Detroit Tigers
- Chris Mañon (born 2001), professional basketball player for the Los Angeles Lakers of the NBA, on a two-way contract with the South Bay Lakers of the NBA G League
- Mike Massenzio (born 1982), retired mixed martial arts fighter formerly with UFC
- Devin McCourty (born 1987), safety for the New England Patriots
- Jason McCourty (born 1987), cornerback for the Miami Dolphins
- Max Middendorf (born 1967) retired ice hockey player, who played in the National Hockey League with the Quebec Nordiques and Edmonton Oilers
- Dan Oates (born 1955), former police chief in Miami Beach, Florida and former police chief of Aurora, Colorado, site of the 2012 Aurora, Colorado shooting in which 12 moviegoers were killed
- Matt Turner (born 1994), Goalkeeper for the Major League Soccer club New England Revolution, on loan from Ligue 1 side Lyon, and the United States national team
- Smith Vilbert (born 2001), American football defensive end for the Minnesota Vikings
- Jay Webber (born 1972), politician who has served in the New Jersey General Assembly since 2008
- K'Waun Williams (born 1991), cornerback for the Denver Broncos
- Yasin Willis (born 2004), American football running back for the Syracuse Orange and the Kansas Jayhawks
- Luke Wypler (born 2001), American football center for the Cleveland Browns

== Notable faculty ==
- John Lovett (born 1950), football coach who began his coaching career at Saint Joseph in 1976
- Patrick Kivlehan, director of student affairs at St Joes currently, previously professional baseball player.
