= Augie Hoffmann =

American football player and coach (born 1981)

No. 74
- Position: Guard

Personal information
- Born: February 23, 1981 (age 45); Park Ridge, New Jersey
- Listed height: 6 ft 2 in (1.88 m)
- Listed weight: 315 lb (143 kg)

Career information
- High school: Saint Joseph Regional (Montvale, New Jersey)
- College: Boston College
- NFL draft: 2004: undrafted

Career history

Playing
- New Orleans Saints (2004–2006)

Coaching
- Saint Joseph Regional HS (NJ) (2010–2013) Assistant coach/freshman head coach; Saint Joseph Regional HS (NJ) (2014–2019) Head coach; Rutgers (2020–2021) Running backs coach; Rutgers (2022) Offensive line coach; Columbia (2023) Tight ends coach; Saint Joseph Regional HS (NJ) (2024–present) Head coach

Awards and highlights
- Scanlan Award winner (2003)

August W. "Augie" Hoffmann III (February 23, 1981) is an American former football guard and the current head football coach at Saint Joseph Regional High School. Hoffmann attended Saint Joseph Regional High School in Montvale, New Jersey. He then went to Boston College, where he played football all four years.

== NFL playing career ==
After graduating from Boston College, Hoffmann went undrafted, but was signed as an undrafted free agent by the New Orleans Saints and was a member of their practice squad in 2004 and 2005. He was signed by the New Orleans Saints to a Reserve/Future contract on January 3, 2006.

== Coaching career ==
=== Saint Joseph Regional High School ===
In July 2009 it was announced that he would return to St. Joe's, as an English teacher and head freshman football coach and assistant to the varsity.

On December 16, 2013, it was announced that he would take over as head coach of the St. Joe's Green Knights Varsity Football team.

=== Rutgers ===
On January 7, 2020 it was announced that Augie would join the Rutgers Scarlet Knights as the team's running backs coach. In 2022, he switched positions and became the team's offensive line coach. It was announced he would not remain with the coaching staff for the 2023 season.

=== Columbia ===
On August 10, 2023, it was announced that Hoffmann would join the Columbia Lions as the team's tight ends coach.

=== Saint Joseph Regional High School (second stint) ===
On December 19, 2023, it was announced that Hoffman would return to St. Joe's as their new football coach for the second stint.On November 28, 2025, Hoffman guided the Green Knights to their 20th State Championship defeating rivals Don Bosco Prep at MetLife Stadium 24-21.
