= Hamin Milligan =

American football player (born 1978)

Hamin Milligan (born September 30, 1978) is a former Arena Football League defensive specialist. He is the older brother of former National Football League safety Hanik Milligan.

== Early life ==
Milligan attended Coconut Creek High School in Coconut Creek, Florida, and starred in football.

== College career ==
Milligan attended Garden City Community College, winning NJCAA All-American honors as a freshman. As a sophomore, he was voted the team captain and the conference's top defensive back. After two years at Garden City, he transferred to the University of Houston.

== Professional career ==
Milligan played for five different teams in the Arena Football League: the San Jose SaberCats (2003), the Arizona Rattlers (2003–2004), the Chicago Rush (2004), the Dallas Desperados (2005–2006), and the Georgia Force (2007–2008).
