= DePaul Catholic High School =

Catholic school in Passaic County, New Jersey, US

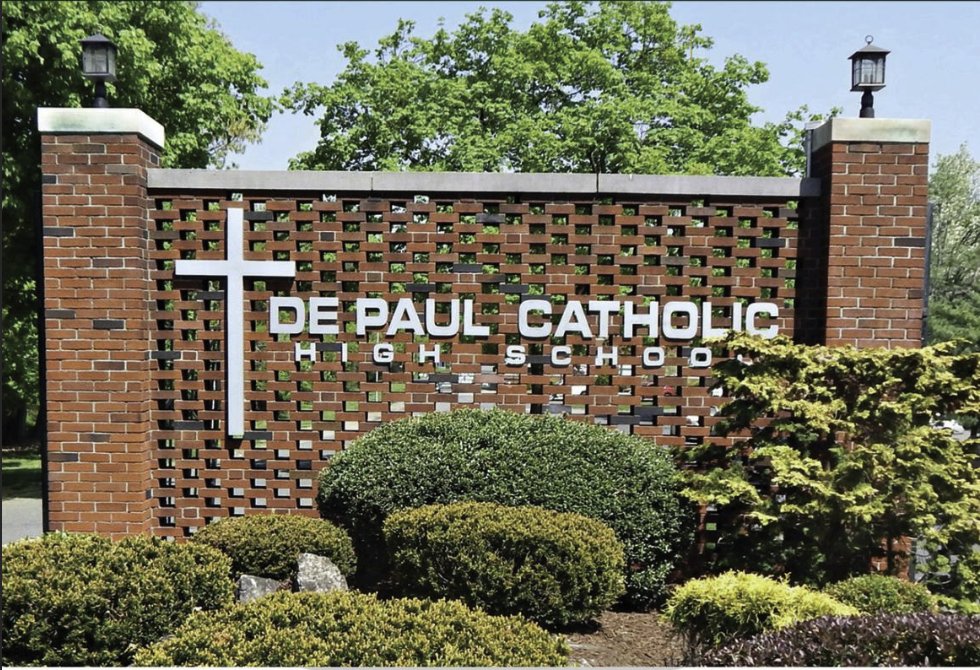

Location
- 1512 Alps Road; Wayne, (Passaic County), New Jersey 07470; United States; 40°57′28″N 74°14′38″W

Information
- Type: Private, coed. high school
- Religious affiliation: Roman Catholic
- Established: 1956
- NCES School ID: 00866272
- President: Theodore Gaffney
- Faculty: NA FTEs
- Grades: 8–12
- Student to teacher ratio: NA
- Colors: Green and white
- Athletics conference: Big North Conference (general); North Jersey Super Football Conference (football)
- Mascot: Spartan
- Team name: Spartans
- Accreditation: AdvancED
- Publication: Impressions (literary magazine)
- Newspaper: The Emerald
- Yearbook: The Green Years
- Tuition: $16,800 (2025–26)
- Affiliation: Diocese of Paterson
- Alumni: 10,000+
- Website: depaulcatholic.org

DePaul Catholic High School is a Catholic high school in Wayne, Passaic County, New Jersey, that operates under the auspices of the Diocese of Paterson. It was founded in 1956 by the Sisters of Charity of Saint Elizabeth.

The school is accredited by AdvancED and in the 2023–24 school year had an enrollment of 475 students.

== History ==
DePaul Catholic was established in 1956 by the Diocese of Paterson and the Sisters of Charity of Saint Elizabeth of Convent Station, New Jersey. While construction ensued on Alps Road in Wayne, New Jersey, the second floor of Holy Spirit Elementary School in Pequannock Township served as the campus of DePaul. Msgr John P. McHugh supervised the completion of the school. A ribbon-cutting ceremony took place in Wayne in late fall 1957 as DePaul Catholic welcomed its first 200 students.

== Academics ==
The program of studies offered at DePaul Catholic High School seeks to equip college-bound students with a foundation for the pursuit of academic excellence while emphasizing a curriculum tailored to individual differences. Students learn to apply their knowledge and training toward the ongoing development of the Whole Person.

DePaul Catholic is a college preparatory high school offering advanced placement, honors, college prep, and foundations levels of study. In the Class of 2015, 98% of graduates are attending colleges and universities. Graduates in the Class of 2015 were awarded over $10.5 million in academic merit-based scholarships, and 99% of the graduates have gone on to colleges, universities, and technical schools.

All students and faculty use Tablet PC laptop computers/notebooks connected using a wireless Internet system.

== Athletics ==
The DePaul Spartans competes in the Big North Conference, which consists of public and private high schools in Bergen and Passaic counties, and was established following a reorganization of sports leagues in Northern New Jersey by the New Jersey State Interscholastic Athletic Association. Before the NJSIAA's 2010 realignment, the school had competed in the Northern Hills Conference an athletic conference consisting of public and private high schools located in Essex, Morris and Passaic counties. With 381 students in grades 10-12, the school was classified by the NJSIAA for the 2019–20 school year as Non-Public A for most athletic competition purposes, which included schools with an enrollment of 381 to 1,454 students in that grade range (and the equivalent of Group I for public schools). The football team competes in the United White division of the North Jersey Super Football Conference, which includes 112 schools competing in 20 divisions, making it the nation's biggest football-only high school sports league. The school was classified by the NJSIAA as Non-Public Group B (equivalent to Group I/II for public schools) for football for 2024–2026, which included schools with 140 to 686 students.

There are over 20 varsity sports for boys and girls in the school. The athletic director is John McKenna . The mascot is the Spartan and the colors are green and white. The sports teams that are available include: Boys - baseball, basketball, bowling, cross country, football, golf, ice hockey, lacrosse, skiing, soccer, swimming, track and field, winter track, volleyball, wrestling; Girls - basketball, bowling, cheerleading (football), cross country, golf, lacrosse, soccer, softball, skiing, swimming, track and field, volleyball, dance team, wrestling, flag football, and winter track. 23 varsity teams for boys and girls and 30 extracurricular activities are offered.

The school participates as the host school/lead agency for a joint cooperative skiing team with Morris Catholic High School. The co-op program operates under agreements scheduled to expire at the end of the 2023–24 school year.

The football team was awarded the sectional championship by the New Jersey State Interscholastic Athletic Association in 1962 and 1972 (as co-champion). Since the playoff system was introduced in 1974, the team has won the Non-Public A North sectional title in 1975, the Non-Public B North state sectional championship in 1992, won the Non-Public II state title in 2013-2015, and won the Non-Public III title in 2017 and 2019. The 1975 team finished the season with a 9-2 record by winning the Parochial A North sectional title after a 7-7 tie in regulation with Bergen Catholic High School was settled in overtime under a system in which each team ran four plays and the winner was the team that gained the most yardage; DePaul was declared the winner based on a margin of 16 yards gained. The 1992 team won the Parochial B North title with a 28-21 win against six-time defending champion Pope John XXIII Regional High School, which came into the playoff finals unbeaten in its previous 24 games. The 2013 team finished the season with a record of 10-2 after winning the Non-Public Group II state title with a 35-16 victory against a Holy Spirit High School team that came undefeated into the championship game played at Rutgers University. In 2017, facing a third-seeded Saint Joseph Regional High School team that had won the previous 13 games between the two teams, top-seeded DePaul won the Non-Public Group III state sectional championship by a score of 7–3 in the tournament title game played at Kean University's Alumni Stadium. The team won the Non-Public Group III in 2019, the program's fifth title in a seven-year span, with a 27–25 win in the finals against Mater Dei High School. The 2024 team ended their season 11–1 after beating Pope John in the Parochial B title game by a score of 33–21.

The boys' cross country team won the Non Public B state championship in 1966.

The field hockey team won the Parochial A North state sectional title in 1982, and went on to win the Parochial A state championship that year, defeating Holy Spirit High School by a score of 2-1 in the title game.

The softball team won the Non-Public A state championship in 1984 (defeating Camden Catholic High School in the tournament final) and won the Non-Public B title in 1985 and 1993 (vs. Bishop Eustace Preparatory School both years).

The boys spring / outdoor track and field team won the Non-Public B state championship in 1989 and 2004. The 1989 team won the Parochial B state title by 60 1/2 to 37 ahead of second-place finisher and returning champion Immaculate Conception High School of Montclair.

The wrestling team won the Parochial A North state sectional title in 1980 and won the Non-Public B North sectional title in 1993 and 2010-2014. The team won the Parochial B state championship in 1993 and the Non-Public B state title in 2014.

== Stand Tall ==
85% of students and staff are members of "Stand Tall", DePaul's voluntary drug prevention program, which offers voluntary and school-sponsored, drug testing for students and staff.

== Notable alumni ==
- Michael Dwumfour (born 1998), American football defensive tackle for the Cleveland Browns
- C. J. Hanson (born 2001), American football guard for the Kansas City Chiefs
- Ronnie Hickman (born 2001), American football safety for the Cleveland Browns
- Nolan James Jr. (class of 2025), college football running back for the Notre Dame Fighting Irish
- Vyto Kab (born 1959, class of 1978), American football tight end who played in the NFL for the Philadelphia Eagles, Detroit Lions and New York Giants
- Eric Klenofsky (born 1994), soccer player who has played for Richmond Kickers of the United Soccer League on loan from D.C. United of Major League Soccer
- Charley Lang (born 1955), actor, director, psychotherapist and professor of psychology
- Gene Mills (born 1958), freestyle wrestler and wrestling coach
- Alyssa Oviedo (born 2000), footballer who plays as a midfielder for the Dominican Republic national team
- Jazlyn Oviedo (born 2002), footballer who plays as a midfielder for the Dominican Republic women's national team
- Tara Palmeri (born 1987, class of 2005), journalist
- Ta'Quan Roberson (born 2000, class of 2019), college football quarterback for the Buffalo Bulls
- Andre Sayegh (born 1974, class of 1992), politician who has served since 2018 as the Mayor of Paterson
- Tommy Vigorito (1959–2025, class of 1977), American football running back and punt returner who played in the NFL for the Miami Dolphins
- Kareem Walker (born 1998), running back who has played for the St. Louis BattleHawks of the XFL
