= Vyto Kab =

American football player (born 1959)

No. 84, 82, 87
- Position: Tight end

Personal information
- Born: December 23, 1959 (age 66); Albany, Georgia, U.S.
- Listed height: 6 ft 5 in (1.96 m)
- Listed weight: 243 lb (110 kg)

Career information
- High school: DePaul Catholic (Wayne, New Jersey)
- College: Penn State
- NFL draft: 1982: 3rd round, 78th overall pick

Career history
- Philadelphia Eagles (1982–1985); New York Giants (1985); Cleveland Browns (1987); Detroit Lions (1987)

Career NFL statistics
- Receptions: 36
- Receiving yards: 386
- Touchdowns: 5
- Stats at Pro Football Reference

Vyto J. Kab (born December 23, 1959) is an American former professional football player who was a tight end in the National Football League (NFL) for the Philadelphia Eagles, New York Giants, and Detroit Lions.

Raised in Wayne, New Jersey, Kab attended DePaul Catholic High School in Wayne, where he was an all-state running-back, linebacker and Academic All-American. He was recruited by many major college football programs before choosing to play for the Penn State Nittany Lions. Kab was selected in the third round with the 78th overall pick of the 1982 NFL draft by the Philadelphia Eagles. Kab was featured on the cover of Sports Illustrated in December 1982, and had established himself as a starter by his second year with the Eagles. Kab was known as a dominating blocking tight end in the NFL.

== Executive Profile ==
After football, Vyto joined his wife Patricia Kab, the founder of SleepTech, and went on to become the co-founder of the sleep disorders company. They served 26 different hospitals in the New York tri-state area, which at the time was the largest sleep disorder provider on the East Coast of the United States. Kab was also the principal in a study of sleep disorders in NFL players that was published in The New England Journal of Medicine.

Kab also serves as an investor, principal and consultant in other healthcare service and real estate-focused companies. He serves on various boards including the Penn State Real Estate Board and the Max Cure Pediatric Cancer Foundation.

== Personal life ==
He and his wife Patricia have two daughters, Devon and Dillon.
