= C. J. Hanson =

American football player (born 2001)

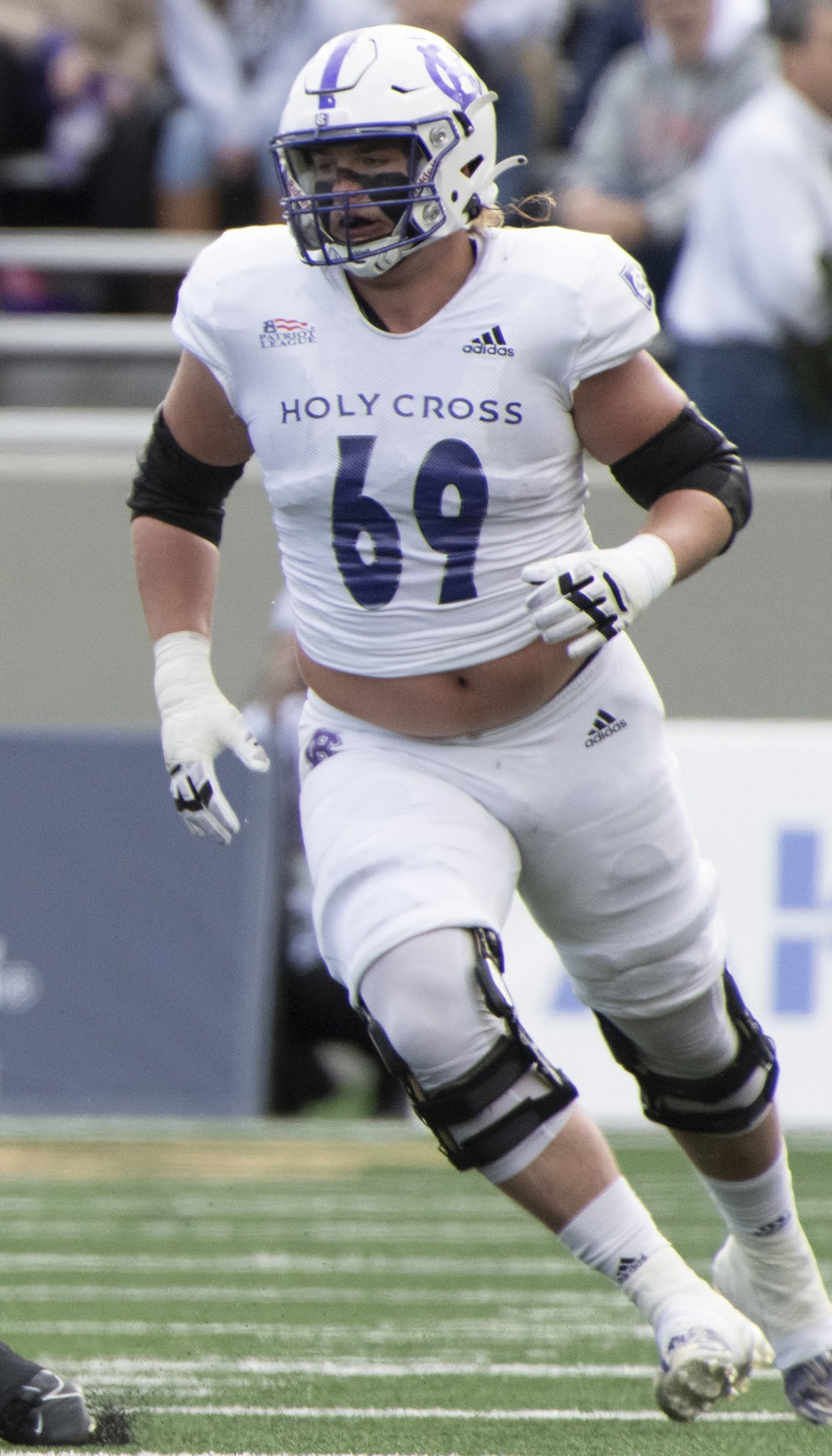
- Hanson with the Holy Cross Crusaders in 2023

Profile
- Position: Guard

Personal information
- Born: March 3, 2001 (age 25); Bergen County, New Jersey, U.S.
- Listed height: 6 ft 5 in (1.96 m)
- Listed weight: 300 lb (136 kg)

Career information
- High school: DePaul Catholic (Wayne, New Jersey)
- College: Holy Cross (2019–2023)
- NFL draft: 2024: 7th round, 248th overall pick

Career history
- Kansas City Chiefs (2024–2025); Minnesota Vikings (2026)*
- * Offseason or practice squad member only

Awards and highlights
- First-team FCS All-American (2023); 2× First-team All-Patriot League (2022, 2023)

Career NFL statistics as of 2025
- Games played: 4
- Stats at Pro Football Reference

Christopher "C. J." Hanson (born March 3, 2001) is an American professional football guard. He played college football for the Holy Cross Crusaders and was selected by the Chiefs in the seventh round of the 2024 NFL draft.

== Early life ==
Hanson was born on March 3, 2001, in Bergen County, New Jersey, and grew up in Wyckoff. After playing flag football in second grade, he began playing tackle football in third grade; he also played a number of other sports including lacrosse growing up. He attended DePaul Catholic High School and played four years on the varsity football team, but only was a starter as a senior, when he was named first-team All-County and second-team All-State at left guard and assisted as DePaul Catholic won the league title. He committed to play college football for the FCS-level Holy Cross Crusaders as a zero-star recruit.

== College career ==
After a redshirt season in 2019 in which Hanson appeared in three games, he recorded his first start in the 2020–21 season while playing a total of three games in the season. He then won the starting nod at right guard in 2021, starting all 13 games that year while being named second-team All-Patriot League by Phil Steele. He started all 13 games in 2022, being named first-team All-Patriot League, and then as team captain in 2023 started all 11 games, earning first-team All-Patriot League, All-Eastern College Athletic Conference (ECAC), All-New England and third-team All-American honors from Stats Perform. In the 2023 season, he helped the team rank in the top six in the FCS in rushing offense, total offense and scoring offense, while allowing no sacks and eight pressures on 321 pass-blocking snaps. He ended his collegiate career having started 38 games, helping the team compile records of 10–3 (2021), 12–1 (2022) and 7–4 (2023) in his three seasons as a full-time starter. He was invited along with Jalen Coker to the NFL Scouting Combine, with him and Coker being the third and fourth players in school history to be invited as well as the first since 1988; he also played at the East–West Shrine Bowl.

== Professional career ==
Pre-draft measurables
Height	Weight	Arm length	Hand span	Wingspan	40-yard dash	10-yard split	20-yard split	20-yard shuttle	Three-cone drill	Vertical jump	Broad jump	Bench press
6 ft 5 in (1.96 m)	300 lb (136 kg)	32 3/8 in (0.82 m)	9 3/8 in (0.24 m)	6 ft 6 3/8 in (1.99 m)	5.00 s	1.76 s	2.91 s	4.71 s	7.90 s	33.5 in (0.85 m)	9 ft 7 in (2.92 m)	25 reps
All values from NFL Combine/Pro Day

=== Kansas City Chiefs ===
Hanson was selected by the Kansas City Chiefs in the seventh round (248th overall) of the 2024 NFL draft, becoming the first player from Holy Cross to be chosen since Rob McGovern in 1989, who was also selected by the Chiefs.

On August 26, 2025, Hanson was waived by the Chiefs as a part of final roster cuts and re-signed to the practice squad the next day. He was promoted to the active roster on December 13.

On August 30, 2026, Hanson was waived/injured by the Chiefs.

=== Minnesota Vikings ===
On November 5, 2026, Hanson signed with the Minnesota Vikings practice squad. On November 10, he was released.
