= Hanik Milligan =

U.S. Virgin Islands gridiron football player (born 1979)

No. 31, 37
- Positions: Safety, special teamer

Personal information
- Born: November 3, 1979 (age 47); St. Croix, U.S. Virgin Islands
- Listed height: 6 ft 3 in (1.91 m)
- Listed weight: 200 lb (91 kg)

Career information
- High school: Coconut Creek (Coconut Creek, Florida)
- College: Houston
- NFL draft: 2003: 6th round, 188th overall pick

Career history
- San Diego Chargers (2003−2005); Arizona Cardinals (2006); St. Louis Rams (2007)

Awards and highlights
- All-Pro (2005); Pro Bowl (2005); 2× All-Conference USA (2001, 2002)

Career NFL statistics
- Total tackles: 58
- Fumble recoveries: 1
- Pass deflections: 2
- Stats at Pro Football Reference

Hanik Alphonse Milligan (born November 3, 1979) is an American former professional football player who was a safety for five seasons in the National Football League (NFL). He played college football for the Houston Cougars. He was selected by the San Diego Chargers in the sixth round of the 2003 NFL draft. In 2005, Milligan earned a Pro Bowl selection for his work on special teams with the Chargers.

== Early life ==
Milligan attended Coconut Creek High School in Coconut Creek, Florida and was a letterman in football. He was named the football team's Defensive MVP and selected for All-County. Milligan graduated from Coconut Creek High School in 1997.

== College career ==
Milligan's college career started at Garden City Community College in 1998 where he redshirted in his freshman year. Milligan left Garden City for Iowa Central Community College in 1999 and where he posted 128 tackles, 21.5 sacks (a school record), and six blocked kicks during his tenure. Finally, Milligan went to the University of Houston where he was a two-time All-Conference USA selection and left the school as the third all-time leading tackler with 408 career stops.

== Professional career ==
Milligan was drafted in the sixth-round (pick 188 overall) by the San Diego Chargers in 2003. Milligan missed his rookie season due to a pectoral injury he suffered in pre-season. Milligan bounced back the next year and recorded 19 tackles (16 solo) on special teams. He was named to the 2006 Pro Bowl, for his play the next season but despite this, San Diego released him at the season's end. The Arizona Cardinals picked him up the next day, but released him on August 27, 2007, at the end of the 2007 preseason.

Milligan was considered one of the best special teams players in the league. His dominant play on special teams has earned him the nickname "Burdman".

=== NFL statistics ===
Year	Team	GP	COMB	TOTAL	AST	SACK	FF	FR	FR YDS	INT	IR YDS	AVG IR	LNG	TD	PD
2004	SD	14	19	16	3	0.0	0	0	0	0	0	0	0	0	1
2005	SD	16	20	13	7	0.0	0	0	0	0	0	0	0	0	0
2006	ARI	16	15	13	2	0.0	0	0	0	0	0	0	0	0	1
2007	STL	7	3	3	0	0.0	0	0	0	0	0	0	0	0	0
Career		53	57	45	12	0.0	0	0	0	0	0	0	0	0	2

== Personal life ==
He is the younger brother of former Arena Football League player Hamin Milligan.
