= Brandon Dixon (American football) =

American football player (born 1990)

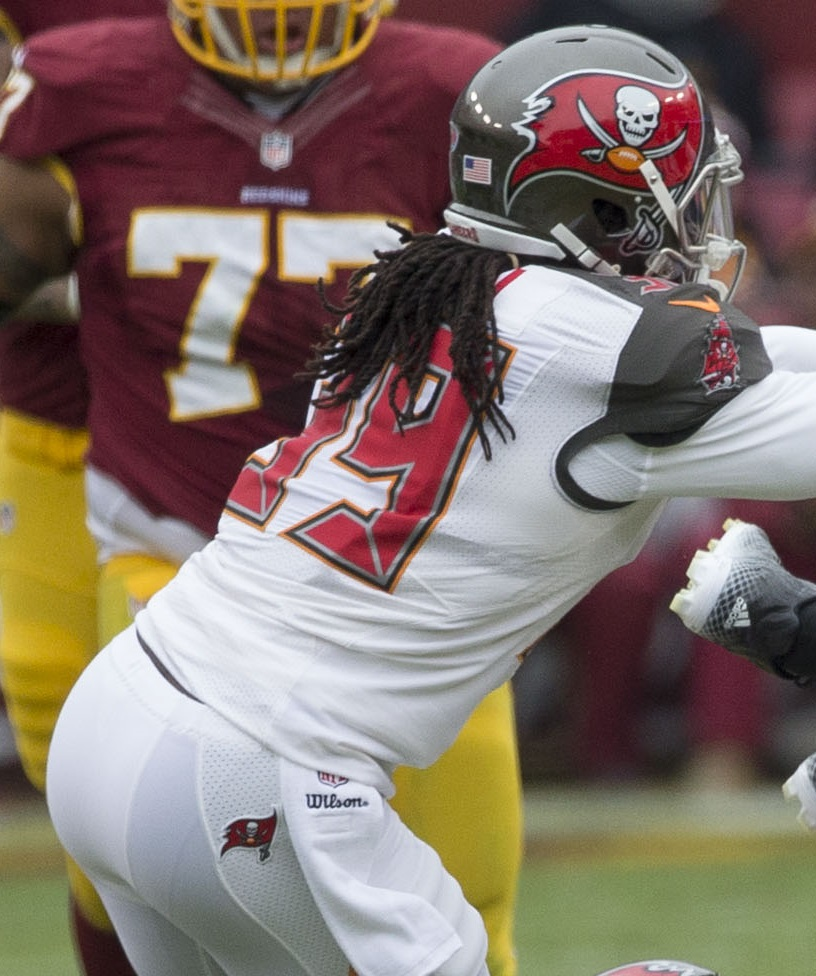
- Dixon with the Tampa Bay Buccaneers in 2014

No. 39, 25
- Position: Cornerback

Personal information
- Born: April 26, 1990 (age 36); Pompano Beach, Florida, U.S.
- Listed height: 5 ft 11 in (1.80 m)
- Listed weight: 203 lb (92 kg)

Career information
- High school: Coconut Creek (FL)
- College: Northwest Missouri State
- NFL draft: 2014: 6th round, 195th overall pick

Career history
- New York Jets (2014)*; Tampa Bay Buccaneers (2014); Seattle Seahawks (2015)*; Indianapolis Colts (2015)*; New England Patriots (2015)*; New Orleans Saints (2015–2016)*; Pittsburgh Steelers (2016–2017)*; New York Giants (2017); Orlando Apollos (2019)
- * Offseason or practice squad member only

Career NFL statistics
- Games played: 19
- Total tackles: 30
- Forced fumbles: 1
- Pass deflections: 6
- Interceptions: 1
- Stats at Pro Football Reference

Brandon Dixon (born April 26, 1990) is an American former professional football player who was a cornerback in the National Football League (NFL). He was selected by the New York Jets in the sixth round of the 2014 NFL draft. He played college football for the Northwest Missouri State Bearcats.

Dixon was also a member of the Tampa Bay Buccaneers, Seattle Seahawks, Indianapolis Colts, New England Patriots, New Orleans Saints, Pittsburgh Steelers, New York Giants and Orlando Apollos.

== College career ==
In 2012, Dixon was selected to the Daktronics and D2Football.com second-team All-America team and was selected to the All-America third-team by The Associated Press.

== Professional career ==
Pre-draft measurables
Height	Weight	Arm length	Hand span	40-yard dash	10-yard split	20-yard split	20-yard shuttle	Three-cone drill	Vertical jump	Broad jump	Bench press
5 ft 11 1/2 in (1.82 m)	203 lb (92 kg)	32 1/2 in (0.83 m)	9 in (0.23 m)	4.41 s	1.56 s	2.59 s	4.27 s	7.15 s	34.0 in (0.86 m)	10 ft 0 in (3.05 m)	17 reps

=== New York Jets ===
On May 10, 2014, Dixon was selected by the New York Jets in the sixth round of the 2014 NFL draft. Dixon was released on August 30, 2014.

=== Tampa Bay Buccaneers ===
On September 1, 2014, Dixon signed with the Tampa Bay Buccaneers to join their practice squad.

On September 6, 2014, the Buccaneers promoted Dixon to their active roster.

In 14 games with the Buccaneers, Dixon recorded 8 solo tackles, 1 assisted tackle, 1 interception, and 2 passes defensed.

=== Seattle Seahawks ===
On September 6, 2015, the Seattle Seahawks signed Dixon to their practice squad.

On September 12, 2015, Dixon was cut from the Seahawks practice squad

=== Indianapolis Colts ===
Dixon was signed to the practice squad of the Indianapolis Colts September 18, 2015. He was released on September 22, 2015.

=== New England Patriots ===
Dixon was signed to the New England Patriots practice squad on October 1, 2015. He was released on October 28, 2015.

=== New Orleans Saints ===
Dixon was signed to the New Orleans Saints practice squad on November 5, 2015, reuniting him with his twin brother Brian Dixon.

The signing made the brothers the only set of twins to play on the same team since the AFL-NFL merger and the first since 1926. They are the twelfth set of twins to play in the NFL and along with the Pounceys and the McCourtys, are the third active set of twins currently playing in the NFL. On August 30, 2016, he was released by the Saints.

=== Pittsburgh Steelers ===
On December 7, 2016, Dixon was signed to the Steelers' practice squad. On December 20, he was released from the Steelers' practice squad. Seven days later, the Steelers re-signed him to the practice squad. He signed a reserve/future contract with the Steelers on January 24, 2017. He was waived on September 2, 2017.

=== New York Giants ===
On October 12, 2017, Dixon was signed to the New York Giants' practice squad. He was promoted to the active roster on November 28, 2017.

On May 15, 2018, Dixon was waived by the Giants.

=== Orlando Apollos ===
Dixon signed with the Orlando Apollos of the Alliance of American Football for the inaugural 2019 season.

== Personal life ==
Dixon's twin brother, Brian, who was also a cornerback, played alongside him in New Orleans. Dixon is the cousin of former cornerback Benny Sapp who played in the National Football League.
