= Brian Dixon (American football) =

American football player (born 1990)

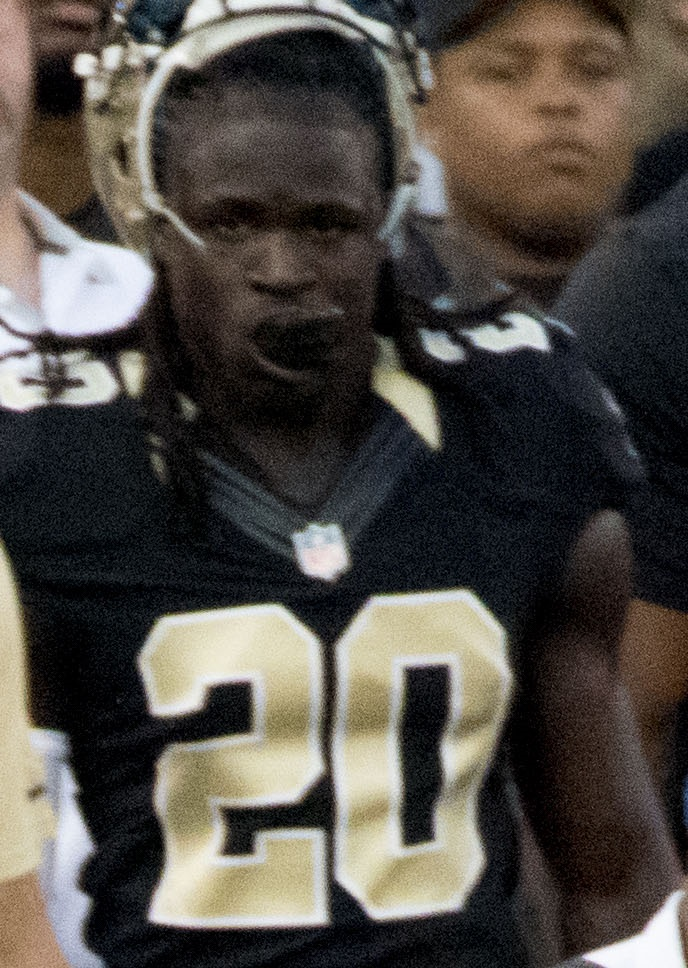
- Dixon with the New Orleans Saints in 2015

No. 20
- Position: Cornerback

Personal information
- Born: April 26, 1990 (age 36); Pompano Beach, Florida, U.S.
- Listed height: 6 ft 0 in (1.83 m)
- Listed weight: 195 lb (88 kg)

Career information
- High school: Coconut Creek (FL)
- College: Northwest Missouri State
- NFL draft: 2014: undrafted

Career history
- New Orleans Saints (2014–2016); Arizona Cardinals (2016); Jacksonville Jaguars (2017)*
- * Offseason or practice squad member only

Career NFL statistics
- Games played: 37
- Total tackles: 42
- Forced fumbles: 2
- Pass deflections: 1
- Stats at Pro Football Reference

Brian Samuel Dixon (born April 26, 1990) is an American former professional football player who was a cornerback in the National Football League (NFL). He played college football for the Northwest Missouri State Bearcats. He signed with the New Orleans Saints as an undrafted free agent in 2014.

== College career ==
Dixon played college football at Joliet Junior College and would later transfer to Northwest Missouri State University.

Dixon had 30 tackles and five interceptions in his junior season at Northwest Missouri State. Dixon Had 21 tackles, 6 passes defensed, one interception, and two forced fumbles while he and his twin brother Brandon both starters help lead the Northwest Missouri State football team to win the 2013 NCAA Division II Football Championship in his senior season.

== Professional career ==
Pre-draft measurables
Height	Weight	Arm length	Hand span	40-yard dash	10-yard split	20-yard split	20-yard shuttle	Three-cone drill	Vertical jump	Broad jump	Bench press
5 ft 11 3/4 in (1.82 m)	196 lb (89 kg)	32 5/8 in (0.83 m)	9 in (0.23 m)	4.41 s	1.59 s	2.56 s	4.59 s	7.07 s	30.5 in (0.77 m)	10 ft 4 in (3.15 m)	14 reps
All values from Pro Day

=== New Orleans Saints ===
On May 12, 2014, Dixon was signed by the New Orleans Saints as undrafted free agent.

On November 5, 2015, the Saints signed Brian's twin brother Brandon Dixon to their practice squad. This made them the only set of twins to play on the same team since the AFL-NFL merger and the first since 1926. They are the twelfth set of twins to play in the NFL and along with the Pounceys and the McCourtys, are the third active set of twins currently playing in the NFL.

On September 3, 2016, he was waived by the Saints. He was then signed to the Saints' practice squad. He was promoted to the active roster on October 1, 2016. He was released and re-signed to the practice squad on October 10. He was promoted to the active roster on October 13, 2016. He was released by the Saints on November 9, 2016, and was re-signed to the practice squad.

=== Arizona Cardinals ===
On December 28, 2016, Dixon was signed by the Cardinals off the Saints' practice squad. On May 2, 2017, Dixon was waived by the Cardinals.

=== Jacksonville Jaguars ===
On May 22, 2017, Dixon was signed by the Jacksonville Jaguars. He was waived on September 2, 2017.

== Personal life ==
Dixon's twin brother, Brandon, was selected by the New York Jets in the sixth round, (195th overall) of the 2014 NFL draft. Dixon is the cousin of former cornerback Benny Sapp who played in the National Football League.
