= Trayvon Mullen =

American football player (born 1997)

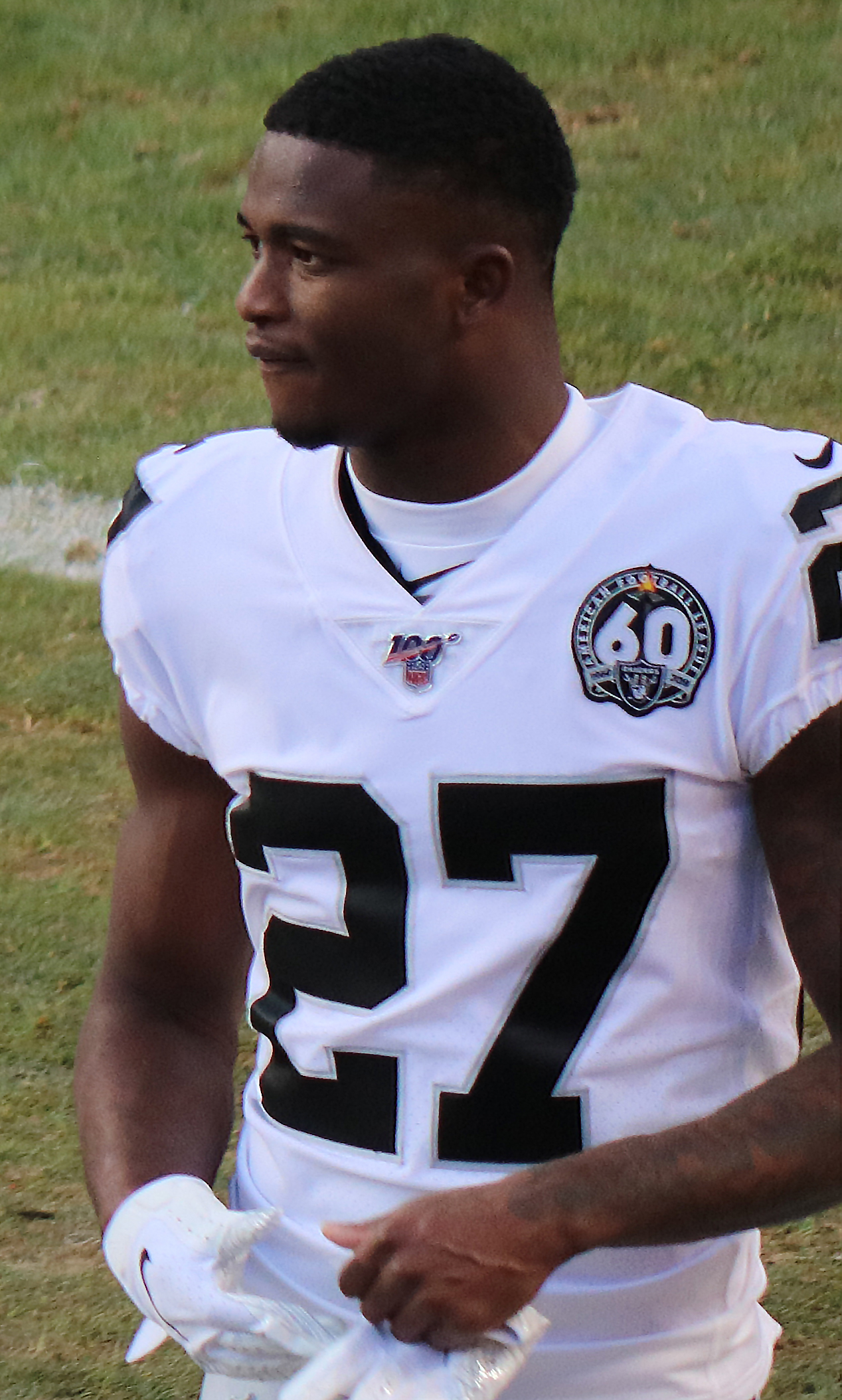
- Mullen with Oakland Raiders in 2019

Profile
- Position: Cornerback

Personal information
- Born: September 20, 1997 (age 29); Fort Lauderdale, Florida, U.S.
- Listed height: 6 ft 2 in (1.88 m)
- Listed weight: 194 lb (88 kg)

Career information
- High school: Coconut Creek (Coconut Creek, Florida)
- College: Clemson (2016–2018)
- NFL draft: 2019: 2nd round, 40th overall pick

Career history
- Oakland / Las Vegas Raiders (2019–2021); Arizona Cardinals (2022); Dallas Cowboys (2022); Baltimore Ravens (2023–2024)

Awards and highlights
- 2× CFP national champion (2016, 2018); CFP National Championship Game Defensive MVP (2019); Second-team All-ACC (2018)

Career NFL statistics
- Total tackles: 150
- Pass deflections: 29
- Interceptions: 4
- Forced fumbles: 1
- Stats at Pro Football Reference

Trayvon Sentell Mullen Jr. (born September 20, 1997) is an American professional football cornerback. Mullen was a highly recruited cornerback coming out of high school and was rated by ESPN as the number two cornerback in his class. He played college football for the Clemson Tigers.

== Early life ==
Mullen attended Coconut Creek High School. As a senior, he was a two-way player at wide receiver and cornerback. He tallied 45 receptions for 800 yards (17.8-yard avg.). He received second-team USA Today All-American honors and played in the U.S. Army All-American game.

== College career ==
Mullen was rated highly by ESPN in his class. Multiple schools offered Mullen a scholarship offer, including LSU, Florida State and Alabama. Mullen chose to attend Clemson on national signing day.

As a freshman, he played sporadically, recording 15 tackles and one pass-breakup. He had 7 tackles against South Carolina State University. He was part of a team that won the National Championship Game against the University of Alabama.

As a sophomore, he received significantly more playing time, as he registered 42 tackles, 3 interceptions and seven pass breakups in 13 games with 12 starts. He received Honorable Mention All-ACC honors. He had 7 tackles and his first career interception against Boston College. He made 9 tackles and one pass defensed against North Carolina State University.

As a junior, he collected 37 tackles (4 for loss), one interception, 4 pass defensed and 2 sacks in 15 games with 14 start. He only played two snaps against Wake Forest University because of an injury. He had 6 tackles and one pass breakup against Boston College. He received Defensive MVP honors in the National Championship Game against the No. 1 ranked University of Alabama, while making 6 tackles, one interception, one sack and one forced fumble.

Following the season, Mullen announced that he would forgo his senior year and declared for the 2019 NFL draft. He finished his college career with 94 tackles (4.5 for loss), 4 interceptions, 12 pass breakups and one forced fumble in 41 games with 26 starts.

=== College statistics ===
Year	School	G	Tackles					Def Int					Fumbles			
Year	School	G	Solo	Ast	Tot	Loss	Sk	Int	Yds	Avg	TD	PD	FR	Yds	TD	FF
2016	Clemson	6	8	9	17	0.5	0.0	0	0	0	0	1	0	0	0	0
2017	Clemson	13	30	10	40	0.0	0.0	3	0	0.0	0	3	0	0	0	0
2018	Clemson	13	30	6	36	4.0	2.0	1	46	46.0	0	3	0	0	0	1
Career		32	68	25	93	4.5	2.0	4	46	11.5	0	7	0	0	0	1

== Professional career ==
Pre-draft measurables
Height	Weight	Arm length	Hand span	Wingspan	40-yard dash	10-yard split	20-yard split	Vertical jump	Broad jump
6 ft 1 1/2 in (1.87 m)	199 lb (90 kg)	31 in (0.79 m)	9 1/8 in (0.23 m)	6 ft 3 5/8 in (1.92 m)	4.46 s	1.50 s	2.63 s	34.5 in (0.88 m)	10 ft 3 in (3.12 m)
All values from NFL Combine

=== Oakland / Las Vegas Raiders ===
==== 2019 season ====
Mullen was selected by the Oakland Raiders in the second round (40th overall) of the 2019 NFL draft.

Mullen made his NFL debut in week 1 against the Denver Broncos. In the game, Mullen made 1 tackle in the 24–16 win. In week 11 against the Cincinnati Bengals, Mullen recorded his first interception off Ryan Finley in the 17–10 win. In week 16 against the Los Angeles Chargers, Mullen suffered a head injury, which caused him to be carted off the field. He registered 50 tackles, 10 passes defensed and one interception.

==== 2020 season ====
In Week 11 against the Kansas City Chiefs, Mullen recorded his first interception of the season off a pass thrown by Patrick Mahomes during the 35–31 loss.

==== 2021 season ====
Mullen entered the 2021 season as a starting cornerback alongside Casey Hayward. On October 9, 2021, he suffered a foot injury in Week 4 and was placed on injured reserve, ending a 36 consecutive games streak. On December 11, Mullen rejoined the active roster. He suffered a toe injury in Week 14 and was placed on injured reserve on December 20.

=== Arizona Cardinals ===
On August 30, 2022, the Raiders traded Mullen to the Arizona Cardinals in exchange of a seventh round pick (#220-Zack Kuntz), the pick could have ended up being a sixth-rounder if he was active for 10 or more games during the season. He was declared inactive in 5 out of 13 games. On December 13, 2022, he was waived a day after a 13-27 loss against the New England Patriots, where he committed a costly facemask penalty that contributed on a touchdown drive.

=== Dallas Cowboys ===
Mullen was claimed off waivers by the Dallas Cowboys on December 14, 2022. He was acquired to provide depth at cornerback after injuries to Anthony Brown and Jourdan Lewis. He appeared in one game as a backup cornerback. He was released on January 21, 2023.

=== Baltimore Ravens ===
On January 23, 2023, the Baltimore Ravens claimed Mullen off waivers. Mullen re-signed with the Ravens on March 14. He was released with a non-football injury designation on July 28, and placed on the non-football injury list.

Mullen was placed on injured reserve on August 27, 2024.

== Personal life ==
His younger brother, Tiawan, is a free agent NFL cornerback. Mullen is the cousin of former Ravens teammate & quarterback Lamar Jackson.
