= Dan Oates =

American police officer (b. 1955)

Daniel J. Oates M.A. J.D.
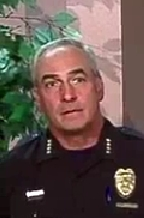
- Dan Oates
- Born: Daniel John Oates; January 2, 1955 (age 71); Hackensack, New Jersey
- Education: Bucknell University (B.A.); New York University (M.A.); New York Law School (J.D.)
- Police career
- Department: Miami Beach Police Department
- Service years: New York PD: 1980–2001; Ann Arbor PD: 2001–2005; Aurora PD: 2005–2013; Miami Beach PD: 2013–
- Status: Chief of police
- Awards: Colorado Association of Chiefs of Police Ralph Smith Innovation Award

Daniel J. Oates (born January 2, 1955) is a career law enforcement official. He is a former chief of police for Miami Beach, Florida, Aurora, Colorado, and Ann Arbor, Michigan. Before becoming police chief in Ann Arbor in 2001, he served 21 years in the New York Police Department. He is a charter member of the federal Criminal Intelligence Coordinating Council. While with the Aurora Police Department, he was responsible for the criminal investigation of a 2012 mass shooting at a local movie theater, which was one of the largest mass shootings in American history.

== Personal life ==
Oates was born in Hackensack, New Jersey. He lived in nearby Oradell, before moving with his family to Midland Park, New Jersey, where he attended grade school at Nativity School. When Oates was 14 years old, he reached the rank of Eagle Scout, the Boy Scouts of America's highest rank. He received the award from a Troop chartered to the Church of the Nativity in Midland Park. Oates is married and has two adult daughters.

== Education ==
Oates attended Saint Joseph Regional High School and graduated in 1973. He received his bachelor's degree at Bucknell University where he majored in English. At Bucknell, he was the newspaper and yearbook editor. He went on to receive his Juris Doctor cum laude from New York Law School in June 1986 and to receive a master's degree from New York University. Oates is licensed to practice law in Colorado, New York, and New Jersey.

== Career ==
After graduating from Bucknell University, Oates took a job as a reporter for the Atlantic City Press. While covering courts, he became interested in a career as a police officer.

Oates began that career with the New York Police Department. He walked a beat in New York's 19th precinct, located on Manhattan's Upper East Side. He worked his way up the ladder, and later held the position of second of command of New York's Brooklyn South Patrol Borough. In this position, he was in charge of 3,000 police officers and 700 civilians. He also served as commanding officer of the legal bureau of the New York City Police Department Cadet Corps. By the end of his 21-year career, Oates had become head of intelligence for the department. There, he was part of the executive staff of Howard Safir, the New York City Police Commissioner. He also arranged security for the Millennium Summit and was also in charge of U.S. presidential security arrangements.

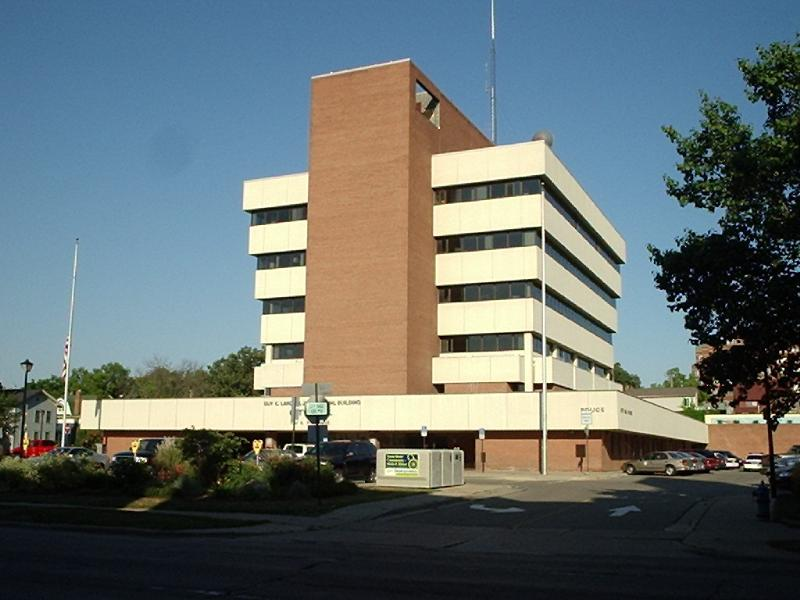
Ann Arbor City Hall and Police Station in 2005

Oates took the helm of the Ann Arbor Police Department in Ann Arbor, Michigan, in the summer of 2001. Ann Arbor Mayor John Hieftje credited his newly hired police chief for mitigating attacks on Muslims after the 9/11 terrorist attacks. Oates oversaw the emergency and fire department in addition to the police department. Due to budget concerns, Oates reduced the size of Ann Arbor's fire and police departments by 20%. At the same time he helped reduce the violent crime rate by 24%. Hieftje also noted that his straightforward management style was an asset to the department. In August 2002, Oates became Ann Arbor's first Safety Services Administrator.

Oates left Ann Arbor and became the police chief in Aurora, Colorado, in 2005 after the former chief, Ricky Bennett, was demoted for his department's failure to stop Brent J. Brents from committing sex crimes. Oates began his career in Aurora by building up a relationship between the police department and minority communities, specifically focusing on the black community whose members felt that the police force was used against minorities. During his first five years in Aurora, he oversaw a 30% decrease in the crime rate.

Oates is currently teaching an online course in Constitutional law for Long Island University.

=== Theater shooting ===
Oates was the chief of police in Aurora at the time of a mass shooting at the midnight showing of The Dark Knight Rises. In a remark on the booby traps in the suspect's apartment, Oates stated that the apartment was rigged "to kill whoever entered it". He expanded on this by saying, "It was going to be a police officer...We sure as hell are angry." When asked about the strength of the case against the alleged shooter, Oates responded, "We will convict him. Yes."

=== Positions held ===
- Former president of the Colorado Association of Chiefs of Police
- Chairperson of the Colorado Information Sharing Consortium
- Member of Police Executive Research Forum
- Member of the Criminal Intelligence Coordinating Council

== Awards ==
Oates received the Colorado Association of Chiefs of Police Ralph Smith Innovation Award in 2008.

Oates received his Eagle Scout Award in 1969.
