= Coconut Creek High School =

Public high school in Coconut Creek, Florida, United States

Coordinates: 26.2467484°N 80.1831019°W

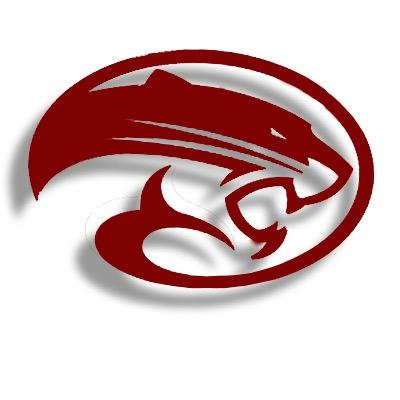

Location
- 1400 Northwest 44 Avenue; Coconut Creek, Florida

Information
- School type: Public
- Established: 1971
- School district: Broward County Public Schools
- Superintendent: Dr. Howard Hepburn
- Principal: Dr. Nicole Nearor
- Staff: 75.00 (FTE)
- Grades: 9-12
- Enrollment: 1,926 (2023–2024)
- Student to teacher ratio: 25.68
- Colors: Garnet; Gold
- Team name: Cougars
- Information: (754) 322-0350
- Website: coconutcreekhigh.browardschools.com

Coconut Creek High School is a high school located in Coconut Creek, Florida, which teaches grades 9–12. Coconut Creek High serves: southern Coconut Creek, and parts of Margate, North Lauderdale, and Pompano Beach. The school is part of Broward County Public Schools and opened in 1970.

== Demographics ==
As of the 2021–22 school year, the total enrollment was 1,916. The ethnic makeup was 74% Black, 21.4% White, 18.5% Hispanic, 2% Multiracial, 1.6% Asian, 0.4% Pacific Islander, and 0.6% Native American or Native Alaskan.

== Notable alumni ==
- Beth Bloom, United States District Court Judge for the Southern District of Florida
- Bobby Cannavale, actor (expelled senior year, did not graduate from CCHS)
- Brandon Dixon, National Football League player
- Brian Dixon, National Football League player
- Brad Eldred, MLB player
- Jonathan Freeny, National Football League player
- Joseline Hernandez, television personality
- Mat Latos, MLB player
- Joe Lo Truglio, actor
- Darrell McClover, National Football League player
- Hamin Milligan, Arena Football League player
- Hanik Milligan, National Football League player
- Trayvon Mullen, National Football League player
- Ryan Parmeter, professional wrestler known as Konnor (The Ascension) with World Wrestling Entertainment
- Dave Thomas, founder of Wendy's
- Binjimen Victor, National Football League player
