= Ron Girault =

American football player (born 1986)

No. 28
- Position: Safety

Personal information
- Born: March 7, 1986 (age 40); Spring Valley, New York
- Listed height: 5 ft 10 in (1.78 m)
- Listed weight: 204 lb (93 kg)

Career information
- High school: Saint Joseph Regional (Montvale, New Jersey)
- College: Rutgers
- NFL draft: 2008: undrafted

Career history
- Kansas City Chiefs (2008)*; New York Jets (2008)*; Las Vegas Locomotives (2011–2012); Tampa Bay Buccaneers (2012)*
- * Offseason or practice squad member only

Ron Girault (born March 7, 1986) is an American former football safety. He was signed by the Kansas City Chiefs as an undrafted free agent in 2008. He played college football at Rutgers.

Girault was also a member of the New York Jets, Las Vegas Locomotives and Tampa Bay Buccaneers.

Girault attended Saint Joseph Regional High School in Montvale, New Jersey, where he led the team as a running back and a defensive back, winning the state Group III parochial title in 2003, his senior year.

== Personal life ==
Girault has three brothers and his mother Marie was an immigrant from Haiti who raised Ron with strong traditional values.
