= Michael Dwumfour =

American football player (born 1998)

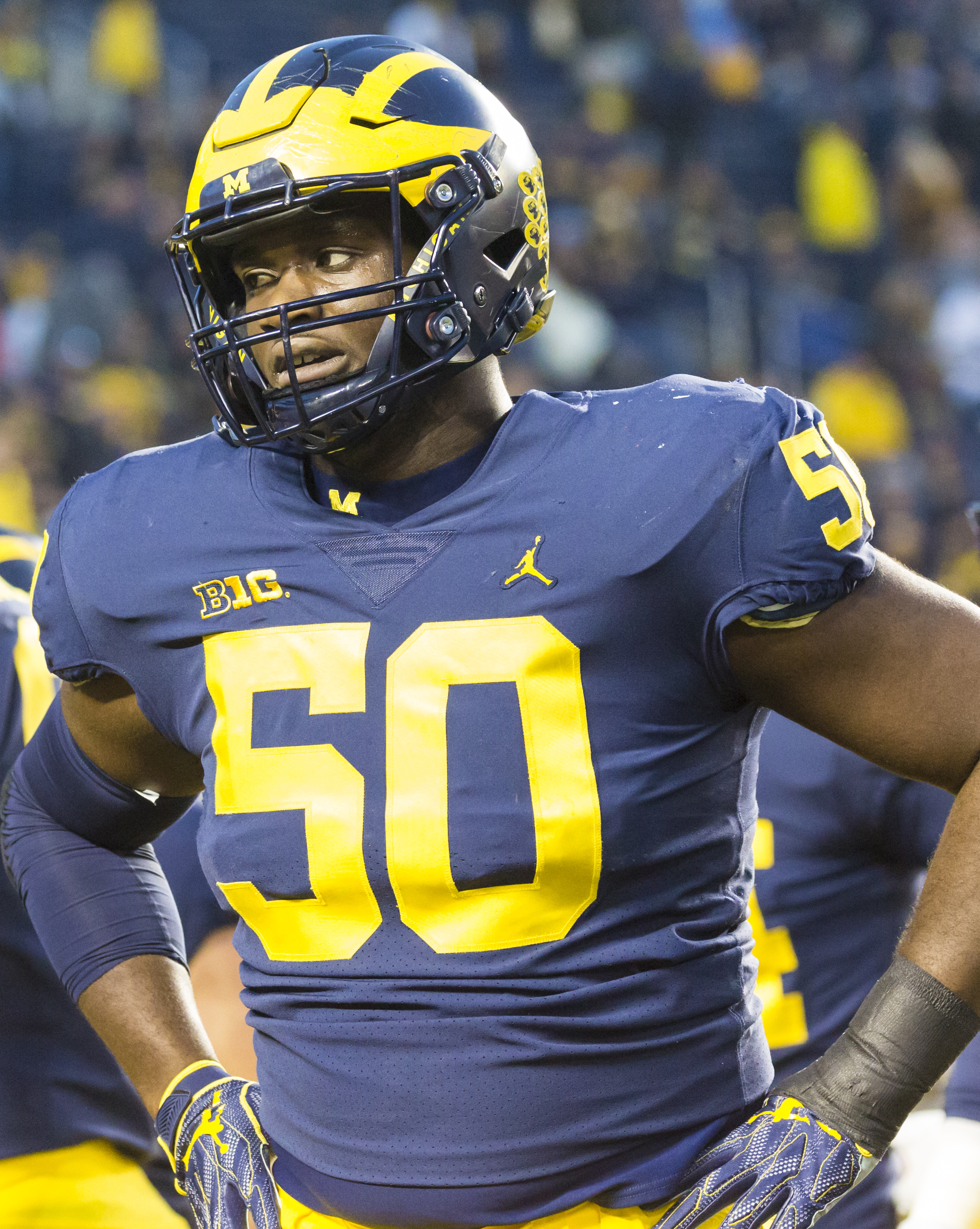
- Dwumfour with the Michigan Wolverines in 2018

Profile
- Position: Defensive tackle

Personal information
- Born: January 1, 1998 (age 28); Scotch Plains, New Jersey, U.S.
- Listed height: 6 ft 1 in (1.85 m)
- Listed weight: 296 lb (134 kg)

Career information
- High school: Depaul Catholic (NJ)
- College: Michigan (2016–2019); Rutgers (2020)
- NFL draft: 2021: undrafted

Career history
- New York Jets (2021)*; Houston Texans (2021–2022); San Francisco 49ers (2022); Cleveland Browns (2023)*; Tennessee Titans (2023)*; Houston Texans (2023)*; Chicago Bears (2023–2024)*; Cleveland Browns (2024)*; San Francisco 49ers (2025)*; Denver Broncos (2025)*; St. Louis Battlehawks (2026)*
- * Offseason or practice squad member only

Career NFL statistics as of 2023
- Total tackles: 13
- Sacks: 0.5
- Fumble recoveries: 1
- Stats at Pro Football Reference

Michael Dwumfour (born January 1, 1998) is an American professional football defensive tackle. He played college football for the Michigan Wolverines and Rutgers Scarlet Knights. He was signed by the New York Jets as an undrafted free agent in 2021. He has also played for the Houston Texans and San Francisco 49ers.

== Early life and education ==
Dwumfour was born on January 1, 1998, in Scotch Plains, New Jersey. He is of Ghanaian descent. He attended Scotch Plains-Fanwood High School with Rashan Gary, before they both transferred, with Gary going to Paramus Catholic High School and Dwumfour moving to DePaul Catholic High School, playing for their football team. As a junior, he recorded 42 tackles and three quarterback sacks. Dwumfour posted 55 tackles and seven sacks as a high school senior, before committing to the University of Michigan. He was rated as a three-star prospect by ESPN, Rivals.com, and Scout.com.

As a true freshman at Michigan, he appeared in one game, the season-opener against Hawaii. As a sophomore, Dwumfour played in nine games, recording four tackles and one sack. He played in all 13 games in his junior year, starting two. He totaled 21 tackles, one interception, and three sacks in the season. As a senior in 2019, Dwumfour played in ten games with two starts, making nine tackles and one sack. He transferred to Rutgers for his final season in 2020. He started eight games at defensive tackle, and made 25 tackles, earning honorable mention All-Big Ten.

== Professional career ==
Pre-draft measurables
Height	Weight	Arm length	Hand span	40-yard dash	10-yard split	20-yard split	20-yard shuttle	Three-cone drill	Vertical jump	Broad jump	Bench press
6 ft 1 5/8 in (1.87 m)	291 lb (132 kg)	32 in (0.81 m)	9 1/4 in (0.23 m)	5.10 s	1.69 s	2.89 s	4.44 s	7.26 s	32.0 in (0.81 m)	9 ft 0 in (2.74 m)	19 reps
All values from Pro Day

=== New York Jets ===
After going unselected in the 2021 NFL draft, Dwumfour signed with the New York Jets as an undrafted free agent. He impressed in the first preseason against the New York Giants, but suffered an injury which led to his release with an injury settlement shortly afterwards.

=== Houston Texans (first stint) ===
Dwumfour was signed by the Houston Texans to the practice squad on October 13. He was activated on December 25, and made his debut in their game against the Los Angeles Chargers, recording a half-sack. He finished the season playing in three games and recording five tackles. He signed a reserve/future contract with the Texans on January 11, 2022.

On October 12, 2022, Dwumfour was placed on injured reserve. He was activated on November 19. He was waived on December 7.

=== San Francisco 49ers (first stint) ===
On December 13, 2022, Dwumfour was signed to the San Francisco 49ers practice squad.

=== Cleveland Browns (first stint) ===
On February 7, 2023, Dwumfour signed a reserve/futures deal with the Cleveland Browns. He was waived on August 10, 2023.

=== Tennessee Titans ===
On August 16, 2023, Dwunfour was signed by the Tennessee Titans. He was waived on August 29, 2023, and re-signed to the practice squad. He was released on September 19.

=== Houston Texans (second stint) ===
On September 27, 2023, Dwumfour was signed to the Texans practice squad. He was released on October 24.

=== Chicago Bears ===
On November 21, 2023, Dwumfour was signed to the Chicago Bears practice squad. He signed a reserve/future contract on January 8, 2024. He was waived on August 26, 2024.

=== St. Louis Battlehawks ===
On November 14, 2024, Dwumfour signed with the St. Louis Battlehawks of the United Football League (UFL).

=== Cleveland Browns (second stint) ===
On December 6, 2024, Dwumfour signed with the Cleveland Browns practice squad.

=== San Francisco 49ers (second stint) ===
On August 7, 2025, Dwumfour signed with the San Francisco 49ers. On August 14, Dwumfour was waived by the 49ers.

=== Denver Broncos ===
On August 20, 2025, Dwumfour was signed by the Denver Broncos but was waived five days later.

=== St. Louis Battlehawks ===
On January 14, 2026, Dwunfour was selected by the St. Louis Battlehawks of the United Football League (UFL). He was released on March 19, 2026.
