= Rutgers Scarlet Knights football statistical leaders =

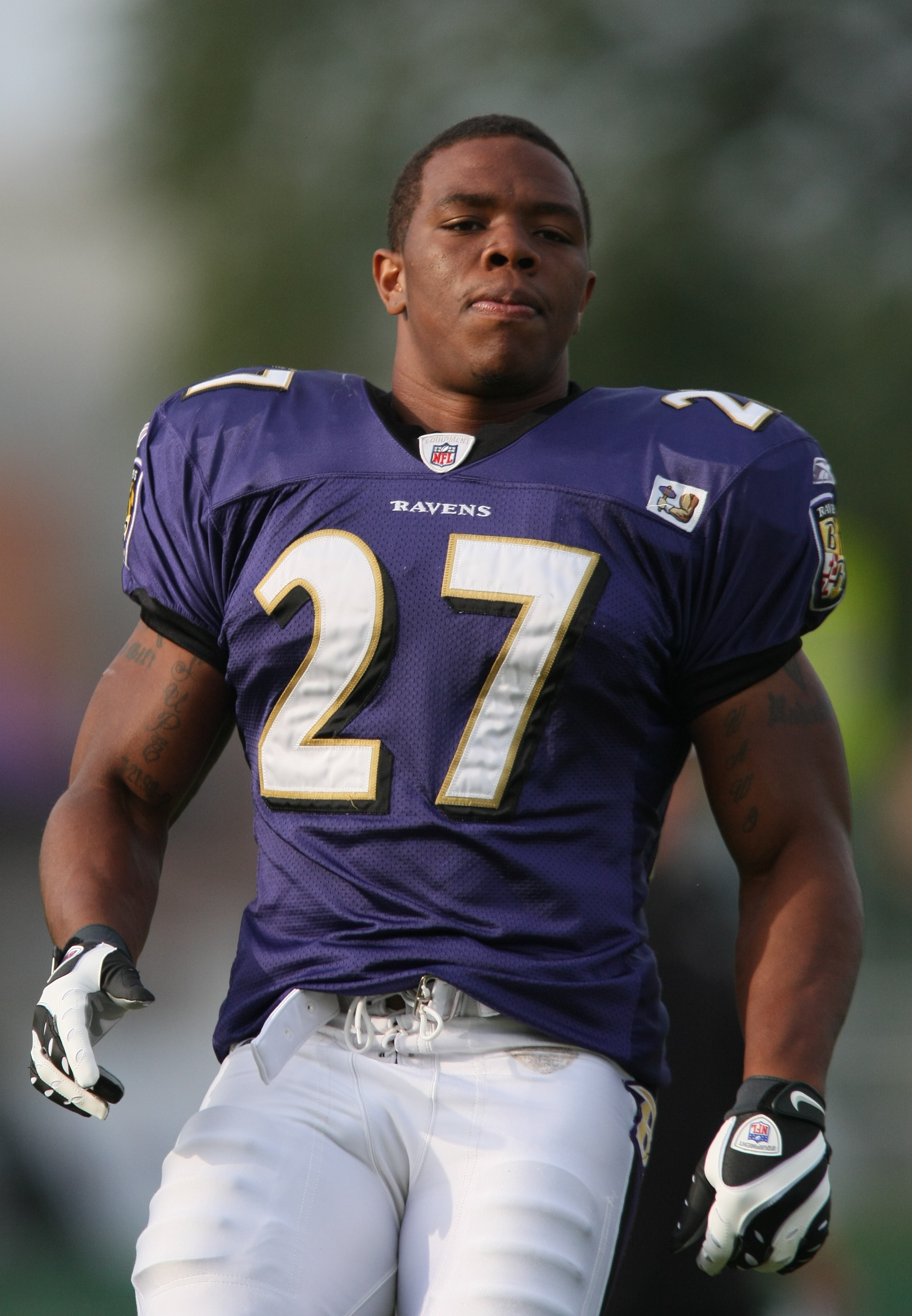
Ray Rice holds Rutgers career and single-season records in rushing yards and rushing touchdowns.

The Rutgers Scarlet Knights football statistical leaders are individual statistical leaders of the Rutgers Scarlet Knights football program in various categories, including passing, rushing, receiving, total offense, defensive stats, and kicking. Within those areas, the lists identify single-game, single-season, and career leaders. The Scarlet Knights represent Rutgers University–New Brunswick in the NCAA's Big Ten Conference.

Although Rutgers began competing in intercollegiate football in 1869, records from before the 1940s are often incomplete and inconsistent, and are often not included in these lists. However, when available, as in the case of Homer Hazel, the players can appear on the lists.

These lists are dominated by more recent players for several reasons:

- Since 1957, seasons have increased from 10 games to 11 and then 12 games in length.
- The NCAA didn't allow freshmen to play varsity football until 1972 (with the exception of the World War II years), allowing players to have four-year careers.
- Bowl games only began counting toward single-season and career statistics in 2002. The Scarlet Knights have played in nine bowl games since then.

These lists are updated through the end of the 2025 season.

== Passing ==
=== Passing yards ===
Career
Rank	Player	Yards	Years
1	Mike Teel	9,383	2005 2006 2007 2008
2	Gary Nova	9,258	2011 2012 2013 2014
3	Ryan Hart	8,482	2002 2003 2004 2005
4	Scott Erney	7,188	1986 1987 1988 1989
5	Mike McMahon	6,608	1997 1998 1999 2000
6	Ray Lucas	5,896	1992 1993 1994 1995
7	Athan Kaliakmanis	5,820	2024 2025
8	Chas Dodd	4,079	2010 2011 2012 2013
9	Eric Hochberg	3,825	1982 1983 1984 1985
10	Bret Kosup	3,613	1974 1976 1977

Single season
Rank	Player	Yards	Year
1	Mike Teel	3,418	2008
2	Ryan Hart	3,154	2004
3	Mike Teel	3,147	2007
4	Athan Kaliakmanis	3,124	2025
5	Gary Nova	2,851	2014
6	Ryan Hart	2,714	2003
7	Athan Kaliakmanis	2,696	2024
8	Gary Nova	2,695	2012
9	Scott Erney	2,536	1989
10	Chris Laviano	2,247	2015

Single game
Rank	Player	Yards	Year	Opponent
1	Mike Teel	447	2008	Louisville
2	Scott Erney	436	1988	Vanderbilt
3	Gary Nova	404	2014	Michigan
4	Gary Nova	397	2012	Arkansas
5	Mike McMahon	386	1997	Army
	Athan Kaliakmanis	386	2025	Washington
7	Ryan Hart	384	2003	Pittsburgh
	Chris Laviano	384	2015	Indiana
9	Noah Vedral	381	2020	Michigan
10	Ray Lucas	374	1994	Virginia Tech
	Ryan Hart	374	2005	Arizona State

=== Passing touchdowns ===
Career
Rank	Player	TDs	Years
1	Gary Nova	73	2011 2012 2013 2014
2	Mike Teel	59	2005 2006 2007 2008
3	Ryan Hart	52	2002 2003 2004 2005
4	Ray Lucas	43	1992 1993 1994 1995
5	Scott Erney	41	1986 1987 1988 1989
	Mike McMahon	41	1997 1998 1999 2000
7	Athan Kaliakmanis	38	2024 2025
8	Frank Burns	30	1945 1946 1947 1948
9	Rich Policastro	29	1968 1969
10	Bret Kosup	25	1974 1976 1977
	Bryan Fortay	25	1992 1993

Single season
Rank	Player	TDs	Year
1	Mike Teel	25	2008
2	Gary Nova	22	2014
	Gary Nova	22	2012
4	Mike Teel	20	2007
	Athan Kaliakmanis	20	2025
6	Mike McMahon	18	2000
	Ryan Hart	18	2005
	Gary Nova	18	2013
	Athan Kaliakmanis	18	2024
10	Ryan Hart	17	2004

Single game
Rank	Player	TDs	Year	Opponent
1	Mike Teel	7	2008	Louisville
2	Mike Teel	6	2008	Pittsburgh
3	Rich Policastro	5	1969	Colgate
	Mike McMahon	5	2000	Villanova
	Gary Nova	5	2012	Arkansas
	Gary Nova	5	2013	Fresno State

== Rushing ==
=== Rushing yards ===
Career
Rank	Player	Yards	Years
1	Ray Rice	4,926	2005 2006 2007
2	Kyle Monangai	3,221	2021 2022 2023 2024
3	Terrell Willis	3,114	1993 1994 1995
4	J.J. Jennings	2,935	1971 1972 1973
5	Bruce Presley	2,792	1992 1993 1994 1995
6	Brian Leonard	2,775	2003 2004 2005 2006
7	Glen Kehler	2,567	1975 1976 1977 1978
8	Isiah Pacheco	2,442	2018 2019 2020 2021
9	Jacki Crooks	2,434	1996 1997 1998 1999
10	Bryant Mitchell	2,286	1966 1967 1968

Single season
Rank	Player	Yards	Year
1	Ray Rice	2,012	2007
2	Ray Rice	1,794	2006
3	J.J. Jennings	1,353	1973
4	Kyle Monangai	1,279	2024
5	J.J. Jennings	1,262	1972
	Kyle Monangai	1,262	2023
7	Terrell Willis	1,261	1993
8	Antwan Raymond	1,241	2025
9	Bryant Mitchell	1,204	1968
10	Curt Edwards	1,157	1975

Single game
Rank	Player	Yards	Year	Opponent
1	Ray Rice	280	2007	Ball State
2	Ray Rice	243	2007	Army
3	Antwan Raymond	240	2025	Maryland
4	Terrell Willis	232	1994	Temple
5	J.J. Jennings	230	1973	UMass
6	Ray Rice	225	2006	Pittsburgh
7	Terrell Willis	221	1993	Army
8	Ray Rice	217	2005	Connecticut
9	J.J. Jennings	214	1972	Colgate
10	Kyle Monangai	208	2024	Akron

=== Rushing touchdowns ===
Career
Rank	Player	TDs	Years
1	Ray Rice	49	2005 2006 2007
2	J.J. Jennings	34	1971 1972 1973
3	Henry Benkert	32	1921 1922 1923 1924
4	Bill Austin	32	1956 1957 1958
5	Brian Leonard	32	2003 2004 2005 2006
6	Harvey Grimsley	28	1946 1947 1948 1949
7	Kyle Monangai	27	2021 2022 2023 2024
8	Mike Fisher	26	1974 1975 1976 1977
9	Homer Hazel	23	1916 1923 1924
10	Albert Smith	23	1982 1983 1984 1985

Single season
Rank	Player	TDs	Year
1	Ray Rice	24	2007
2	J.J. Jennings	21	1973
3	Ray Rice	19	2006
4	Howard Talman	16	1915
	Henry Benkert	16	1924
6	Bill Austin	15	1958
7	Terrell Willis	13	1993
	Kyle Monangai	13	2024
	Antwan Raymond	13	2025
10	Frank Kelly	12	1917

Single game
Rank	Player	TDs	Year	Opponent
1	Howard Talman	5	1915	Rensselaer
	J.J. Jennings	5	1973	Princeton
3	Bill Austin	4	1957	Richmond
	Curt Edwards	4	1975	Lafayette
	Terrell Willis	4	1993	Army
	Justise Hairston	4	2003	Navy
	Ray Rice	4	2008	Ball State
	Isiah Pacheco	4	2019	UMass

== Receiving ==
=== Receptions ===
Career
Rank	Player	Rec	Years
1	Mohamed Sanu	210	2009 2010 2011
2	Brian Leonard	207	2003 2004 2005 2006
3	Tres Moses	192	2001 2002 2003 2004
4	Kenny Britt	178	2006 2007 2008
5	Marco Battaglia	171	1992 1993 1994 1995
6	Bo Melton	164	2017 2018 2019 2020 2021
7	Jim Guarantano	158	1989 1990 1991 1992
8	Chris Brantley	144	1990 1991 1992 1993
9	Clark Harris	143	2003 2004 2005 2006
10	Tiquan Underwood	132	2005 2006 2007 2008

Single season
Rank	Player	Rec	Year
1	Mohamed Sanu	115	2011
2	Kenny Britt	87	2008
3	Tres Moses	81	2004
4	Marco Battaglia	69	1995
5	Tiquan Underwood	65	2007
6	Jim Guarantano	62	1991
	Kenny Britt	62	2007
8	Brian Leonard	61	2004
9	KJ Duff	60	2025
10	Dymere Miller	59	2024

Single game
Rank	Player	Rec	Year	Opponent
1	Mohamed Sanu	16	2011	Ohio
2	Jack Emmer	13	1966	Holy Cross
	Eric Young	13	1988	Vanderbilt
	Marco Battaglia	13	1995	Penn State
	Mohamed Sanu	13	2011	Army
	Mohamed Sanu	13	2011	North Carolina
7	Andrew Baker	12	1984	Boston College
	Andy Holland	12	1997	Pittsburgh
	Kenny Britt	12	2007	Louisville
	Kenny Britt	12	2008	West Virginia

=== Receiving yards ===
Career
Rank	Player	Yards	Years
1	Kenny Britt	3,043	2006 2007 2008
2	Tres Moses	2,522	2001 2002 2003 2004 2005
3	Leonte Carroo	2,373	2012 2013 2014 2015
4	Andrew Baker	2,268	1981 1982 1983 1984
5	Mohamed Sanu	2,263	2009 2010 2011
6	Tim Brown	2,257	2006 2007 2008 2009
7	Marco Battaglia	2,221	1992 1993 1994 1995
8	Jim Guarantano	2,065	1989 1990 1991 1992
9	Clark Harris	2,015	2003 2004 2005 2006
10	Bo Melton	2,011	2017 2018 2019 2020 2021

Single season
Rank	Player	Yards	Year
1	Kenny Britt	1,371	2008
2	Kenny Britt	1,232	2007
3	Mohamed Sanu	1,206	2011
4	Tim Brown	1,150	2009
5	Tiquan Underwood	1,100	2007
6	KJ Duff	1,084	2025
7	Tres Moses	1,056	2004
8	Marco Battaglia	894	1995
9	Andrew Baker	857	1983
10	Mark Harrison	829	2010

Single game
Rank	Player	Yards	Year	Opponent
1	Tiquan Underwood	248	2007	Buffalo
2	KJ Duff	241	2025	Purdue
3	Mark Harrison	240	2010	Cincinnati
4	Jack Emmer	237	1966	Holy Cross
5	Brandon Coleman	223	2011	Connecticut
6	Andrew Baker	210	1983	Penn State
7	Kenny Britt	197	2008	Army
8	KJ Duff	196	2026	UMass
9	Mark Twitty	192	1974	Colgate
10	Shawn Tucker	186	2003	Pittsburgh

=== Receiving touchdowns ===
Career
Rank	Player	TDs	Years
1	Leonte Carroo	29	2012 2013 2014 2015
2	Brandon Coleman	20	2011 2012 2013
3	Tim Brown	18	2006 2007 2008 2009
	Mark Harrison	18	2009 2010 2011 2012
5	Chris Brantley	17	1990 1991 1992 1993
	Kenny Britt	17	2006 2007 2008
7	Marco Battaglia	16	1992 1993 1994 1995
	Tres Moses	16	2001 2002 2003 2004 2005
	Tiquan Underwood	16	2005 2006 2007 2008
10	Brian Leonard	13	2003 2004 2005 2006

Single season
Rank	Player	TDs	Year
1	Marco Battaglia	10	1995
	Brandon Coleman	10	2012
	Leonte Carroo	10	2014
	Leonte Carroo	10	2015
5	Bob Simms	9	1958
	Tim Brown	9	2009
	Mark Harrison	9	2010
	Leonte Carroo	9	2013
9	Reggie Funderburk	8	1994
	Kenny Britt	8	2007

Single game
Rank	Player	TDs	Year	Opponent
1	Chris Brantley	4	1992	Virginia Tech
	Mark Harrison	4	2010	Cincinnati
3	Kenny Britt	3	2008	Pittsburgh
	Leonte Carroo	3	2013	Fresno State
	Leonte Carroo	3	2015	Norfolk State
	Leonte Carroo	3	2015	Michigan State
	Leonte Carroo	3	2015	Indiana
	Ian Strong	3	2025	Maryland
	KJ Duff	3	2026	UMass

== Total offense ==
Total offense is the sum of passing and rushing statistics. It does not include receiving or returns.

=== Total offense yards ===
Career
Rank	Player	Yards	Years
1	Mike Teel	9,173	2005 2006 2007 2008
2	Gary Nova	9,258	2011 2012 2013 2014
3	Ryan Hart	8,149	2002 2003 2004 2005
4	Scott Erney	7,320	1986 1987 1988 1989
5	Mike McMahon	6,793	1997 1998 1999 2000
6	Ray Lucas	6,643	1992 1993 1994 1995
7	Athan Kaliakmanis	6,045	2024 2025
8	Ray Rice	4,926	2005 2006 2007 2008
9	Chas Dodd	3,793	2010 2011 2012 2013
10	Eric Hochberg	3,731	1982 1983 1984 1985

Single season
Rank	Player	Yards	Year
1	Mike Teel	3,345	2008
2	Mike Teel	3,098	2007
	Athan Kaliakmanis	3,098	2025
4	Ryan Hart	3,061	2004
5	Athan Kaliakmanis	2,947	2024
6	Scott Erney	2,675	1989
7	Gary Nova	2,651	2012
8	Ryan Hart	2,538	2003
9	Ray Lucas	2,456	1995
10	Mike McMahon	2,400	2000

Single game
Rank	Player	Yards	Year	Opponent
1	Mike Teel	447	2008	Louisville

=== Total touchdowns ===
Career
Rank	Player	TDs	Years
1	Gary Nova	77	2011 2012 2013 2014
2	Mike Teel	61	2005 2006 2007 2008
3	Ray Lucas	58	1992 1993 1994 1995
4	Ryan Hart	54	2002 2003 2004 2005
5	Mike McMahon	49	1997 1998 1999 2000
6	Ray Rice	49	2005 2006 2007 2008
7	Scott Erney	47	1986 1987 1988 1989
8	Bill Austin	45	1956 1957 1958
	Athan Kaliakmanis	45	2024 2025
10	Bret Kosup	36	1974 1974 1975 1976

Single season
Rank	Player	TDs	Year
1	Mike Teel	27	2008
2	Gary Nova	25	2014
3	Ray Rice	24	2007
	Athan Kaliakmanis	24	2025
5	Ray Lucas	22	1995
	Gary Nova	22	2012
7	J.J. Jennings	21	1973
	Mike McMahon	21	2000
	Athan Kaliakmanis	21	2024
10	Mike Teel	20	2007
	Gavin Wimsatt	20	2023

Single game
Rank	Player	TDs	Year	Opponent
1	Mike Teel	7	2008	Louisville

== Defense ==
=== Interceptions ===
Career
Rank	Player	Ints	Years
1	John Pollock	14	1965 1966 1967 1968
	Ed Jones	14	1971 1972 1973 1974
	Tony Pawlik	14	1972 1973 1974
4	Bill Austin	13	1956 1957 1958
5	Bob Davis	12	1975 1976 1977
	Bill Houston	12	1981 1982 1983
7	Sam Chapman	11	1969 1970 1971
	Malik Jackson	11	1990 1991 1992 1993
9	John Miller	10	1969 1970
	Jim Testom	10	1974 1975 1976
	Jim Hughes	10	1975 1976 1977 1978
	Ron Girault	10	2004 2005 2006 2007

Single season
Rank	Player	Ints	Year
1	John Pollock	9	1968
2	John Miller	8	1969
	Tony Pawlik	8	1973
4	Bill Vigh	7	1947
	Ed Jones	7	1974
6	Bill Austin	6	1958
	Sam Chapman	6	1970
	Bob Hynoski	6	1978
	Bill Houston	6	1982
	Bill Houston	6	1983

Single game
Rank	Player	Ints	Year	Opponent
1	Sam Mudie	3	1961	Colgate
	John Pollock	3	1968	Colgate
	Larry Clymer	3	1970	Colgate
	Tony Pawlik	3	1973	Lafayette
	Malik Jackson	3	1992	Virginia Tech

=== Tackles ===
Career
Rank	Player	Tackles	Years
1	Tyronne Stowe	533	1983 1984 1985 1986
2	Jim Dumont	448	1979 1981 1982 1983
3	Brian Sheridan	389	1993 1994 1995 1996 1997
4	Khaseem Greene	387	2009 2010 2011 2012
5	Courtney Greene	386	2005 2006 2007 2008
6	Pat Udovich	363	1986 1987 1988 1989
7	Aaron Brady	354	1995 1996 1997 1998
8	Steve Longa	335	2013 2014 2015
9	Keith Woetzel	323	1980 1981 1982
10	Tim Blanchard	312	1975 1976 1977 1978

Single season
Rank	Player	Tackles	Year
1	Brian Sheridan	161	1997
2	Tyronne Stowe	157	1985
3	Jim Dumont	154	1983
4	Tyronne Stowe	150	1986
5	Khaseem Greene	141	2011
6	Pat Udovich	140	1989
7	Khaseem Greene	136	2012
8	Aaron Brady	136	1998
9	Jim Dumont	133	1982
10	Brian Sheridan	132	1995

Single game
Rank	Player	Tackles	Year	Opponent
1	Tyronne Stowe	27	1986	West Virginia

=== Sacks ===
Career
Rank	Player	Sacks	Years
1	Nate Toran	52.0	1973 1974 1975 1976
2	Dan Gray	29.0	1975 1976 1977
3	Dino Mangiero	26.0	1976 1977 1978 1979
	Jamaal Westerman	26.0	2005 2006 2007 2008
5	Shawn Williams	21.0	1989 1990 1991 1992
6	Ryan Neill	19.0	2001 2002 2003 2004 2005
7	Raheem Orr	18.0	2001 2002 2003
8	Mike Pellowski	17.0	1968 1969 1970
	Ed Steward	17.0	1977 1978 1979 1980
	Ramel Meekins	17.0	2003 2004 2005 2006

Single season
Rank	Player	Sacks	Year
1	Nate Toran	19.0	1974
2	Nate Toran	17.0	1976
3	Nate Toran	16.0	1975
4	Dino Mangiero	14.0	1979
5	Dan Gray	12.0	1975
	Shawn Williams	12.0	1991
7	Dan Gray	10.0	1976
	Ed Steward	10.0	1978
	Val Barnaby	10.0	2005
	Ryan Neill	10.0	2005

Single game
Rank	Player	Sacks	Year	Opponent
1	Mike Pellowski	4.0	1969	Lafayette
2	Ryan D'Imperio	3.0	2008	South Florida
	Mike Tverdov	3.0	2020	Maryland
	Olakunle Fatukasi	3.0	2021	Temple

== Kicking ==
=== Field goals made ===
Career
Rank	Player	FGs	Years
1	Jeremy Ito	80	2004 2005 2006 2007
2	San San Te	64	2008 2009 2010 2011
3	Kennan Startzell	46	1976 1977 1978 1979
	Kyle Federico	46	2012 2013 2014 2015
5	Jai Patel	43	2023 2024 2025
6	Alex Falcinelli	38	1980 1981 1982
7	Tom Angstadt	36	1983 1984 1985
8	Carmen Sclafani	29	1987 1988
9	John Benestad	28	1990 1991 1992 1993
10	Doug Giesler	27	1986 1987 1988 1989

Single season
Rank	Player	FGs	Year
1	Jeremy Ito	23	2007
2	Jeremy Ito	22	2006
3	Jeremy Ito	20	2005
	San San Te	20	2011
5	Tom Angstadt	19	1984
6	San San Te	18	2009
7	Carmen Sclafani	17	1988
8	Kyle Federico	16	2014
9	Kennan Startzell	15	1978
	Jeremy Ito	15	2004
	Jai Patel	15	2023
	Jai Patel	15	2024

Single game
Rank	Player	FGs	Year	Opponent
1	Tom Angstadt	5	1984	Cincinnati

=== Field goal percentage ===
Career
Rank	Player	FG%	Years
1	Jai Patel	78.2%	2023 2024 2025
2	Valentino Ambrosio	77.8%	2020 2021
3	Alex Falcinelli	77.6%	1980 1981 1982
4	Doug Giesler	77.1%	1986 1987 1988 1989
5	Justin Davidovicz	76.9%	2018 2019 2020
6	Jeremy Ito	72.1%	2004 2005 2006 2007
7	David Bonagura	71.4%	2014 2015 2016
8	Kyle Federico	69.7%	2012 2013 2014 2015
9	Carmen Sclafani	69.0%	1987 1988
10	San San Te	66.7%	2008 2009 2010 2011

Single season
Rank	Player	FG%	Year
1	Jai Patel	83.3%	2023
2	Valentino Ambrosio	81.8%	2020
3	Alex Falcinelli	80.0%	1982
4	Kennan Startzell	78.9%	1978
	Jai Patel	78.9%	2024
6	Kyle Federico	76.2%	2014
7	Jeremy Ito	75.9%	2006
8	Kyle Federico	75.0%	2007
	Valentino Ambrosio	75.0%	2021
10	Jeremy Ito	74.2%	2007
