= 2006 Rutgers Scarlet Knights football team =

American college football season

2006 Rutgers Scarlet Knights football
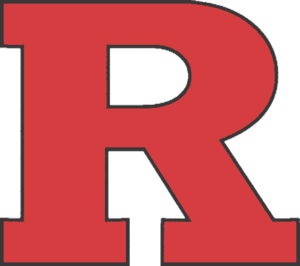

Texas Bowl champion

Texas Bowl, W 37–10 vs. Kansas State
- Conference: Big East Conference

Ranking
- Coaches: No. 12
- AP: No. 12
- Record: 11–2 (5–2 Big East)
- Head coach: Greg Schiano (6th season)
- Co-offensive coordinators: Craig Ver Steeg (4th season); John McNulty (1st season)
- Offensive scheme: Pro-style
- Base defense: 4–3
- Home stadium: Rutgers Stadium

2006 Big East Conference football standings
	Conf.			Overall
Team	W		L	W		L
No. 6 Louisville $	6	–	1	12	–	1
No. 10 West Virginia	5	–	2	11	–	2
No. 12 Rutgers	5	–	2	11	–	2
South Florida	4	–	3	9	–	4
Cincinnati	4	–	3	8	–	5
Pittsburgh	2	–	5	6	–	6
Connecticut	1	–	6	4	–	8
Syracuse	1	–	6	4	–	8
$ – BCS representative as conference champion; Rankings from AP Poll

The 2006 Rutgers Scarlet Knights football team was an American football team that represented Rutgers University as a member of the Big East Conference during the 2006 NCAA Division I FBS football season. In their sixth season under head coach Greg Schiano, the Scarlet Knights compiled an 11–2 record (5–2 in conference games), tied for second place in the Big East, and outscored opponents by a total of 387 to 186.

The Scarlet Knights won their first nine games, including shutouts over Illinois (33–0) and Navy (34–0) and a 28–25 win over No. 3 Louisville, highlighted by Jeremy Ito's last-minute field goal. They concluded the season with a victory over Kansas State in the Texas Bowl, the first bowl victory in program history. Rutgers was ranked No. 12 in the final Associated Press and Coaches polls.

The Scarlet Knights gained an average of 180.2 rushing yards and 164.9 passing yards per game. On defense, they gave up 101.0 rushing yards and 151.2 passing yards per game. The team's outstanding individual achievements included:

- Sophomore running back Ray Rice set a new Rutgers rushing record, tallying 1,794 rushing yards and 20 touchdowns on 335 carries. Rice won Big East Player of the Year honors. He also finished seventh in Heisman Trophy voting and was a finalist for the Maxwell Award. Rice was also named the most valuable player in the Texas Bowl, rushing for 170 yards and a touchdown in 24 carries.
- Senior fullback Brian Leonard tallied 423 rushing yards and 294 receiving yards and won the Draddy Trophy, sometimes known as the "Academic Heisman".
- Sophomore quarterback Mike Teel completed 164 of 296 passes (55.4%) for 2,135 yards, 12 touchdowns, and 13 interceptions.
- Tight end Clark Harris led the team with 493 receiving yards on 34 receptons. Brian Leonard led the team with 38 receptions.
- Senior defensive tackle and captain Ramel Meekins was twice selected as the national defensive player of the week.
- Linebacker Devraun Thompson led the team with 83 total tackles (45 solo, 38 assists). Defensive back Courtney Green led the team with 51 solo tackles.
- Placekicker Jeremy Ito converted 22 of 29 field goal attempts and 41 of 42 extra-point kicks.

The team played its home games at Rutgers Stadium in Piscataway, New Jersey.

== Schedule ==
Date	Time	Opponent	Rank	Site	TV	Result	Attendance	Source
September 2	3:30 pm	at North Carolina*		Kenan Memorial Stadium; Chapel Hill, NC	ABC	W 21–16	50,000	
September 9	12:00 pm	Illinois*		Rutgers Stadium; Piscataway, NJ	ESPN2	W 33–0	41,036	
September 16	3:30 pm	Ohio*^{†}		Rutgers Stadium; Piscataway, NJ	MSG	W 24–7	41,102	
September 23	2:00 pm	Howard*	No. 23	Rutgers Stadium; Piscataway, NJ	MSG	W 56–7	35,558	
September 29	8:00 pm	at South Florida	No. 23	Raymond James Stadium; Tampa, FL	ESPN2	W 22–20	32,493	
October 14	1:30 pm	at Navy*	No. 24	Navy–Marine Corps Memorial Stadium; Annapolis, MD	CSTV	W 34–0	36,918	
October 21	5:45 pm	at Pittsburgh	No. 19	Heinz Field; Pittsburgh, PA	ESPN2	W 20–10	49,620	
October 29	8:00 pm	Connecticut	No. 16	Rutgers Stadium; Piscataway, NJ	ESPN	W 24–13	43,620	
November 9	7:45 pm	No. 3 Louisville	No. 15	Rutgers Stadium; Piscataway, NJ	ESPN	W 28–25	44,111	
November 18	7:45 pm	at Cincinnati	No. 7	Nippert Stadium; Cincinnati, OH	ESPN2	L 11–30	27,804	
November 25	12:00 pm	Syracuse	No. 15	Rutgers Stadium; Piscataway, NJ	ESPNU	W 38–7	43,791	
December 2	7:45 pm	at No. 15 West Virginia	No. 13	Milan Puskar Stadium; Morgantown, WV	ESPN	L 39–41 ^{3OT}	60,299	
December 28	8:00 pm	vs. Kansas State*	No. 16	Reliant Stadium; Houston, TX (Texas Bowl)	NFL Network	W 37–10	52,210	
*Non-conference game; ^{†}Homecoming; Rankings from AP Poll released prior to the game; All times are in Eastern time

== Rankings ==
Ranking movements Legend: ██ Increase in ranking ██ Decrease in ranking — = Not ranked RV = Received votes
	Week															
Poll	Pre	1	2	3	4	5	6	7	8	9	10	11	12	13	14	Final
AP	—	—	—	—	23	24	24	19	16	15	15	7	15	13	16	12
Coaches	RV	RV	RV	RV	23	23	24	19	16	15	14	8	16	13	17	12
Harris	Not released				23	24	24	19	15	14	13	7	15	13	16	Not released
BCS	Not released							16	14	12	13	6	14	13	16	Not released

== Roster ==
- William Beckford, defensive end, No. 35, 6'1", 230 pounds, senior
- Kenny Britt, wide receiver, No. 88, 6'4", 205 pounds, freshman
- Tim Brown, wide receiver
- Dennis Campbell, wide receiver
- Jack Corcoran, running back, No. 19, 6'1", 230 pounds, freshman
- Eric Foster, No. 56, defensive tackle, 6'2", 260 pounds, junior
- Willie Foster, wide receiver, No. 84, 5'10", 175 pounds, senior
- Ron Girault, defensive back
- Courtney Greene, defensive back, No. 36, 6'1", 205 pounds, sophomore
- Clark Harris, tight end, No. 81, 6'6", 260 pounds, senior
- Jeremy Ito, placekicker, No. 1, 5'11", 185 pounds, junior
- Brian Leonard, fullback, No. 28, 6'2", 235 pounds, senior
- Jabu Lovelace, quarterback, No. 15, 6'2", 200 pounds, freshman
- Devin McCourty, defensive back, No. 21, 5'11", 180 pounds, freshman
- Jason McCourty, defensive back, No. 25, 5'11", 180 pounds, sophomore
- Ramel Meekins, defensive tackle, No. 60, 6'0", 275 pounds, senior
- Brandon Renkart, linebacker, No. 47, 6'3", 235 pounds, junior
- Ray Rice, running back, No. 27, 5'9", 195 pounds, sophomore
- Mike Teel, quarterback, No. 14, 6'4", 220 pounds, sophomore
- Devraun Thompson, linebacker, No. 55, 5'11", 220 pounds, senior
- James Townsend, wide receiver
- Tiquan Underwood, wide receiver, No. 7, 6'2", 175 pounds, sophomore
- Jamaal Westerman, defensive end, No. 90, 6'3", 252 pounds, sophomore
- Kordell Young, running back, No. 8, 5'9", 190 pounds freshman
