= Doug Graber =

American football coach (born 1944)

Biographical details
- Born: September 26, 1944 (age 82); Detroit, Michigan, U.S.

Coaching career (HC unless noted)
- 1966: St. Frances Cabrini HS (MI) (assistant)
- 1967–1968: St. Frances Cabrini HS (MI)
- 1969–1971: Michigan Tech (DC)
- 1972–1975: Eastern Michigan (DC)
- 1976–1977: Ball State (DB)
- 1978–1981: Wisconsin (DB)
- 1982: Montana State
- 1983–1986: Kansas City Chiefs (DB)
- 1987–1989: Tampa Bay Buccaneers (DC)
- 1990–1995: Rutgers
- 2001–2003: Frankfurt Galaxy
- 2004: New York Jets (DB)
- 2009: Ball State (DC)

Head coaching record
- Overall: 35–41–1 (college); 16–15 (NFL Europe)

Accomplishments and honors

Championships
- 1 World Bowl (XI); 1 Big Sky (1982)

Awards
- NFL Europe Coach of the Year (2003)

Douglas Graber (born September 26, 1944) is an American former football coach. He graduated from Wayne State University (1966) in Detroit, Michigan. He began his coaching career at St. Frances Cabrini Elementary School and High School in Allen Park, Michigan. He served as the head football coach at Montana State University in 1982 and at Rutgers University–New Brunswick from 1990 to 1995, compiling a career college football record of 35–41–1. Graber was also the head coach of the Frankfurt Galaxy of NFL Europe from 2001 to 2003. He led the Galaxy to an overall record of 16–15, including a World Bowl XI championship.

== Coaching career ==
=== Montana State ===
Graber got his first collegiate head coaching job on December 16, 1981, when he was hired by Montana State University. During his only season in Bozeman, he led the Bobcats to a 6–5 overall record and a tie for the first place in the Big Sky Conference with a 5–2 league record. He left the school in February 1983 to become an assistant coach with the Kansas City Chiefs of the National Football League.

=== National Football League ===
Graber was a member of the Chiefs' staff for four seasons, working for head coach John Mackovic. He handled defensive quality control duties during his first year, while also helping defensive coordinator Bud Carson coach the defensive backs. In August 1984, Carson resigned and Graber took over coaching the secondary.

=== Frankfurt Galaxy ===
After a five-year hiatus from coaching, Graber was hired as the head coach of NFL Europe's Frankfurt Galaxy on September 18, 2000. He became the fourth coach in team history, succeeding Jack Elway (1991–1992), Ernie Stautner (1995–1997) and Dick Curl (1998–2000). In his first year at the helm, the Galaxy finished sixth in the league with a record of 3–7.

== Head coaching record ==
=== College ===
| Year | Team | Overall | Conference | Standing | Bowl/playoffs |
|---|---|---|---|---|---|
Montana State Bobcats (Big Sky Conference) (1982)
| 1982 | Montana State | 6–5 | 5–2 | T–1st | |
| Montana State: | | 6–5 | 5–2 | | |
Rutgers Scarlet Knights (NCAA Division I-A independent) (1990)
| 1990 | Rutgers | 3–8 | | | |
Rutgers Scarlet Knights (Big East Conference) (1991–1995)
| 1991 | Rutgers | 6–5 | 2–3 | | |
| 1992 | Rutgers | 7–4 | 4–2 | | |
| 1993 | Rutgers | 4–7 | 1–6 | 7th | |
| 1994 | Rutgers | 5–5–1 | 2–4–1 | 6th | |
| 1995 | Rutgers | 4–7 | 2–5 | 6th | |
| Rutgers: | | 29–36–1 | 11–20–1 | | |
| Total: | | 35–41–1 | | | |
National championship Conference title Conference division title or championship game berth

=== Professional ===
| Year | Team | Overall | Conference | Standing | Bowl/playoffs |
|---|---|---|---|---|---|
Frankfurt Galaxy (NFL Europe) (2001–2003)
| 2001 | Frankfurt Galaxy | 3–7 | | 6th | |
| 2002 | Frankfurt Galaxy | 6–4 | | 3rd | |
| 2003 | Frankfurt Galaxy | 6–4 | | 1st | W World Bowl XI |
| Frankfurt Galaxy: | | 16–15 | | | |
| Total: | | 16–15 | | | |
