= Eric Hochberg =

Eric Hochberg may refer to:

- Eric Hochberg (American football), quarterback for Rutgers University
- Eric Hochberg (biologist) (1941–2023), American marine biologist
