= 1993 All-Big East Conference football team =

American college football all-star team

The 1993 All-Big East football team consists of American football players chosen as All-Big East Conference players for the 1993 NCAA Division I-A football season. The organizations selecting All-Big East teams in 1993 included the conference coaches.

The 1993 West Virginia Mountaineers football team led the conference with an 11–0 record in the regular season. Don Nehlen was selected as the coach of the year. Five West Virginia players received first-team honors.

== Offensive selections ==
=== Quarterbacks ===
- Glenn Foley, Boston College - Coaches-1
- Jake Kelchner, West Virginia (Coaches-2)

=== Running backs ===
- Curtis Martin, Pitt - Coaches-1
- Terrell Willis, Rutgers - Coaches-1
- Darnell Campbell, Boston College - Coaches-2
- Robert Walker, West Virginia - Coaches-2

=== Receivers ===
- Chris Brantley, Rutgers - Coaches-1
- Shelby Hill, Syracuse - Coaches-1
- Chris Jones, Miami (FL) - Coaches-1
- Antonio Freeman, Virginia Tech - Coaches-2
- Marvin Harrison, Syracuse - Coaches-2

=== Tight ends ===
- Pete Mitchell, Boston College - Coaches-1
- John Burke, Virginia Tech - Coaches-2

=== Offensive tackles ===
- Rich Braham, West Virginia - Coaches-1
- Tre Johnson, Temple - Coaches-1
- Reuben Brown, Pitt - Coaches-2
- Scott Vaughn, Rutgers - Coaches-2

=== Offensive guards ===
- Tom Robsock, West Virginia - Coaches-1
- Tirrell Greene, Miami (FL) - Coaches-1
- Greg Landry, Boston College, Coaches-2
- Rudy Barber, Miami (FL) - Coaches-2

=== Centers ===
- Jim Pyne, Virginia Tech - Coaches-1
- Tom Nalen, Boston College - Coaches-2

== Defensive selections ==
=== Defensive line ===
- Darren Krein, Miami (FL) - Coaches-1
- Kevin Mitchell, Syracuse - Coaches-1
- Kevin Patrick, Miami (FL) - Coaches-1
- Warren Sapp, Miami (FL) - Coaches-1
- Tom Barndt, Pitt - Coaches-2
- Andrew Beckett, Rutgers - Coaches-2
- Barry Hawkins, West Virginia - Coaches-2

=== Linebackers ===
- Stephen Boyd, Boston College - Coaches-1
- Tim Brown, West Virginia - Coaches-1
- Tom Tumulty, Pitt - Coaches-1
- Ken Brown, Virginia Tech - Coaches-2
- Lance Johnstone, Temple - Coaches-2
- Rohan Marley, Miami (FL) - Coaches-2
- Wes Richardson, West Virginia - Coaches-2

=== Defensive backs ===
- Terris Harris
- Tryonne Drakeford, Virginia Tech - Coaches-1
- Dwayne Joseph, Syracuse - Coaches-1
- Dexter Seigler, Miami (FL) - Coaches-1
- Mike Collins, West Virginia - Coaches-2
- Maurice Williams, Pitt - Coaches-2
- Joe Kamara, Boston College - Coaches-2
- Michael Reed, Boston College - Coaches-2
- David Mayfield, West Virginia - Coaches-2

== Special teams ==
=== Kickers ===
- Pat O'Neill, Syracuse - Coaches-1
- Todd Sauerbrun, West Virginia - Coaches-2

=== Punters ===
- Todd Sauerbrun, West Virginia - Coaches-1
- Pat O'Neill, Syracuse - Coaches-2

=== Return specialist ===
- Mike Baker, West Virginia - Coaches-1
- Terrell Willis, Rutgers - Coaches-2

== Individual honors ==
- Offensive player of the year - Glenn Foley, quarterback, Boston College
- Defensive player of the year - Kevin Patrick, defensive end, Miami (FL)
- Special teams player of the year - Pat O'Neil, punter/kicker, Syracuse
- Rookie of the years - Terrell Willis, running back, Rutgers
- Coach of the year - Don Nehlen, West Virginia

== Key ==
Coaches, selected by the Big East coaches

== See also ==
- 1993 All-America college football team
