= 1995 Rutgers Scarlet Knights football team =

American college football season

1995 Rutgers Scarlet Knights football
- Conference: Big East Conference
- Record: 4–7 (2–5 Big East)
- Head coach: Doug Graber (6th season)
- Offensive coordinator: Stan Parrish (6th season)
- Defensive coordinator: John Gutekunst (2nd season)
- Home stadium: Rutgers Stadium; Giants Stadium

1995 Big East Conference football standings
| | Conf. | | | Overall |
| Team | W | | L | W | | L |
|---|---|---|---|---|---|---|
| No. 10 Virginia Tech + | 6 | – | 1 | 10 | – | 2 |
| No. 20 Miami (FL) + | 6 | – | 1 | 8 | – | 3 |
| No. 19 Syracuse | 5 | – | 2 | 9 | – | 3 |
| West Virginia | 4 | – | 3 | 5 | – | 6 |
| Boston College | 4 | – | 3 | 4 | – | 8 |
| Rutgers | 2 | – | 5 | 4 | – | 7 |
| Temple | 1 | – | 6 | 1 | – | 10 |
| Pittsburgh | 0 | – | 7 | 2 | – | 9 |
+ – Conference co-champions; Rankings from AP Poll

The 1995 Rutgers Scarlet Knights football team represented Rutgers University in the 1995 NCAA Division I-A football season. In their sixth and final season under head coach Doug Graber, the Scarlet Knights compiled a 4–7 record, were outscored by opponents 412 to 304, and finished in sixth place in the Big East Conference. The team's statistical leaders included Ray Lucas with 2,180 passing yards, Terrell Willis with 773 rushing yards, and Marco Battaglia with 894 receiving yards.

== Schedule ==
| Date | Time | Opponent | Site | TV | Result | Attendance | Source |
|---|---|---|---|---|---|---|---|
| September 9 | | at Duke* | Wallace Wade Stadium; Durham, NC | | L 14–24 | 25,400 | |
| September 16 | | Navy* | Rutgers Stadium; Piscataway, NJ | BEN | W 27–17 | 33,820 | |
| September 23 | 7:30 pm | No. 6 Penn State* | Giants Stadium; East Rutherford, NJ | ESPN | L 34–59 | 58,870 | |
| September 30 | 6:00 pm | Syracuse | Rutgers Stadium; Piscataway, NJ | | L 17–27 | 32,832 | |
| October 14 | 7:30 pm | at Miami (FL) | Miami Orange Bowl; Miami, FL | BEN | L 21–56 | 19,747 | |
| October 21 | 1:00 pm | Virginia Tech | Rutgers Stadium; Piscataway, NJ | | L 17–45 | 19,292 | |
| October 28 | 1:00 pm | Pittsburgh | Rutgers Stadium; Piscataway, NJ | | W 42–24 | 18,911 | |
| November 4 | 12:00 pm | at West Virginia | Mountaineer Field; Morgantown, WV | | L 26–59 | 42,642 | |
| November 11 | | at Tulane* | Louisiana Superdome; New Orleans, LA | | W 45–40 | 16,098 | |
| November 18 | | at Temple | Veterans Stadium; Philadelphia, PA | | W 23–20 | 3,733 | |
| November 24 | 11:00 am | Boston College | Rutgers Stadium; Piscataway, NJ | ABC | L 38–41 | 20,114 | |
*Non-conference game; Rankings from AP Poll released prior to the game

== Game summaries ==
=== Duke ===
Rutgers Scarlet Knights at Duke Blue Devils

| Quarter | 1 | 2 | 3 | 4 | Total |
|---|---|---|---|---|---|
| Rutgers | 0 | 14 | 0 | 0 | 14 |
| Duke | 14 | 0 | 0 | 10 | 24 |

at Wallace Wade Stadium, Durham, North Carolina

- Date: September 9, 1995
- Game attendance: 25,400
- Recap, pg. 122

Game information
First quarter
- DUKE - Marshall 12-yard run (Cochran kick)
- DUKE - Marshall 2-yard run (Cochran kick)

Second quarter

- RUT - Johnson 1-yard run (Mike-Mayer kick)
- RUT - Curry 3-yard pass from Lucas (Mike-Mayer)

Third quarter

- No scoring

Fourth quarter

- DUKE - Opalenick 13-yard pass from Fischer (Cochran kick)
- DUKE - Cochran 33-yard FG

=== Navy ===
Navy Midshipmen at Rutgers Scarlet Knights

| Quarter | 1 | 2 | 3 | 4 | Total |
|---|---|---|---|---|---|
| Navy | 0 | 17 | 0 | 0 | 17 |
| Rutgers | 7 | 10 | 7 | 3 | 27 |

at Rutgers Stadium, Piscataway, New Jersey

- Date: September 16, 1995
- Game attendance: 33,820
- Recap pg. 122

Game information
First quarter
- RUT - Willis 25-yard run (Mike-Mayer kick)

Second quarter

- RUT - Willis 72-yard run (Mike-Mayer kick)
- NAVY - McCoy 4-yard run (Covarubbias kick)
- NAVY - McCoy 1-yard run (Covarubbias kick)
- RUT - Mike-Mayer 21-yard field goal
- NAVY - Covarubbias 47-yard field goal

Third quarter

- RUT - Battaglia 25-yard pass from Lucas (Mike-Mayer kick)

Fourth quarter

- RUT - Mike-Mayer 43-yard field goal

=== Penn State ===
Penn State Nittany Lions at Rutgers Scarlet Knights

| Quarter | 1 | 2 | 3 | 4 | Total |
|---|---|---|---|---|---|
| Penn State | 17 | 7 | 14 | 21 | 59 |
| Rutgers | 7 | 10 | 10 | 7 | 34 |

at Giants Stadium, East Rutherford, New Jersey

- Date: September 23, 1995
- Game time: 7:30 p.m. EST
- Game attendance: 58,870
- Box Score

Game information
First quarter
- PSU - Engram 58 fumble return (Conway kick)
- PSU - FG Conway 42
- PSU - Engram 47 pass from Richardson (Conway kick)
- RUT - Presley 3 run (Mike-Mayer kick)

Second quarter

- PSU - Milne 18 run (Conway kick)
- RUT - FG Mike-Mayer 47
- RUT - Battaglia 17 pass from Higgins (Mike-Mayer kick)

Third quarter

- PSU - Engram 29 pass from Richardson (Conway kick)
- RUT - Battaglia 35 pass from Higgins (Mike-Mayer kick)
- PSU - Witman 4 run (Conway kick)
- RUT - FG Mike-Mayer 33

Fourth quarter

- PSU - Herring 21 interception return (Conway kick)
- PSU - Engram 16 pass from Richardson (Conway kick)
- RUT - Battaglia 4 pass from Higgins (Mike-Mayer kick)
- PSU - Campbell 42 pass from McQueary (Barninger kick)

=== Syracuse ===
Syracuse Orangemen at Rutgers Scarlet Knights

| Quarter | 1 | 2 | 3 | 4 | Total |
|---|---|---|---|---|---|
| Syracuse | 0 | 3 | 14 | 10 | 27 |
| Rutgers | 7 | 10 | 0 | 0 | 17 |

at Rutgers Stadium, Piscataway, New Jersey

- Date: September 30, 1995
- Game time: 6:00 p.m. EST
- Game attendance: 32,832
- Recap pg. 123

Game information
First quarter
- RUT - Presley 1-yard run (Mike-Mayer kick)

Second quarter

- SYR - Mare 44-yard FG
- RUT - Lucas 4-yard run (Mike-Mayer kick)
- RUT - Mike-Mayer 32-yard FG

Third quarter

- SYR - Thomas 7-yard run (Mare kick)
- SYR - Harrison 8-yard pass from McNabb (Mare kick)

Fourth quarter

- SYR - Mare 32-yard FG
- SYR - Harrison 66-yard pass from McNabb (Mare kick)

=== Miami (FL) ===
Rutgers Scarlet Knights at Miami Hurricanes

| Quarter | 1 | 2 | 3 | 4 | Total |
|---|---|---|---|---|---|
| Rutgers | 7 | 7 | 0 | 7 | 21 |
| Miami (FL) | 14 | 35 | 0 | 7 | 56 |

at Orange Bowl, Miami, Florida

- Date: October 14, 1995
- Game time: 7:30 p.m. EST
- Game attendance: 42,642
- Recap, pg. 124

Game information
First quarter
- RUT - Battaglia 7-yard pass from Lucas (Mike-Mayer kick)
- UM - German 59-yard pass from Clement (Prewitt kick)
- UM - Green 28-yard pass from Clement (Prewitt kick)

Second quarter

- UM - Ferguson 1-yard run (Prewitt kick)
- UM - Ferguson 46-yard pass from Clement (Prewitt kick)
- UM - McMillan 2-yard run (Prewitt kick)
- UM - Ward 26-yard blocked punt return (Prewitt kick)
- UM - Benton 61-yard pass from Covington (Prewitt kick)
- RUT - Lucas 11-yard run (Mike-Mayer kick)

Third quarter

- No scoring

Fourth quarter

- UM - Lewis 64-yard INT return (Prewitt kick)
- RUT - Harper 3-yard pass from Lucas (Mike-Mayer kick)

=== Virginia Tech ===
Virginia Tech Hokies at Rutgers Scarlet Knights

| Quarter | 1 | 2 | 3 | 4 | Total |
|---|---|---|---|---|---|
| Virginia Tech | 7 | 7 | 17 | 14 | 45 |
| Rutgers | 3 | 7 | 0 | 7 | 17 |

at Rutgers Stadium, Piscataway, New Jersey

- Date: October 21, 1995
- Game time: 1:00 p.m. EST
- Game attendance: 19,292
- Recap pg. 124

Game information
First quarter
- RUT - Mike-Mayer 33-yard field goal
- VT - Oxendine 1-yard run (Larsen kick)

Second quarter

- RUT - Bosch 2-yard run (Mike-Mayer kick)
- VT - Still 7-yard pass from Druckenmiller (Larsen kick)

Third quarter

- VT - Larsen 27-yard field goal
- VT - Holmes 40-yard pass from Druckenmiller (Larsen kick)
- VT - D.Thomas 5-yard run (Larsen kick)

Fourth quarter

- RUT - Harper 9-yard pass from Lucas (Mike-Mayer kick)
- VT - Coleman 51-yard fumble return (Larsen kick)
- VT - Newsome 71-yard INT return (Larsen kick)

=== Pitt ===
Pitt Panthers at Rutgers Scarlet Knights

| Quarter | 1 | 2 | 3 | 4 | Total |
|---|---|---|---|---|---|
| Pitt | 0 | 16 | 0 | 8 | 24 |
| Rutgers | 0 | 28 | 7 | 7 | 42 |

at Rutgers Stadium, Piscataway, New Jersey

- Date: October 28, 1995
- Game time: 1:00 p.m. EST
- Game attendance: 18,911
- Recap pg. 125

Game information
First quarter
- No scoring

Second quarter

- PITT - Jells 27-yard pass from Gonzalez (Ferencik kick)
- RUT - Battaglia 13-yard pass from Lucas (Mike-Mayer kick)
- PITT - Harris 74-yard run (kick failed)
- RUT - Willis 83-yard kickoff return (Mike-Mayer kick)
- PITT - Ferencik 27-yard field goal
- RUT - Harper 20-yard pass from Lucas (Mike-Mayer kick)
- RUT - Battaglia 21-yard pass from Lucas (Mike-Mayer kick)

Third quarter

- RUT - Rivers 100-yard fumble return (Mike-Mayer kick)

Fourth quarter

- PITT - Durham 5-yard pass from Ryan (Butler pass from Ryan)
- RUT - Woolridge 25-yard interception return (Mike-Mayer kick)

=== West Virginia ===
Rutgers Scarlet Knights at West Virginia Mountaineers

| Quarter | 1 | 2 | 3 | 4 | Total |
|---|---|---|---|---|---|
| Rutgers | 6 | 6 | 7 | 7 | 26 |
| West Virginia | 10 | 21 | 14 | 14 | 59 |

at Mountaineer Field, Morgantown, West Virginia

- Date: November 4, 1995
- Game time: 12:00 p.m. EST
- Game attendance: 42,642
- Recap, pg. 125

Game information
First quarter
- WVU - Purnell 49-yard pass from Johnston (Baumann kick)
- WVU - Baumann 25-yard field goal
- RUT - Harper 77-yard pass from Lucas (kick failed)

Second quarter

- WVU Gary 17-yard run (Baumann kick)
- WVU - Gary 1-yard run (Baumann kick)
- RUT - Lucas 4-yard run (kick failed)
- WVU - Gary 2-yard run (Baumann kick)

Third quarter

- WVU - Saunders 21-yard pass from Johnston (Baumann kick)
- RUT - Harper 28-yard pass from Lucas (Kucowski kick)
- WVU - Purnell 76-yard pass from Johnston (Baumann kick)

Fourth quarter

- WVU - Saunders 32-yard pass from Johnston (Baumann kick)
- RUT - Presley 1-yard run (Kucowski kick)
- WVU - White 60-yard run (Baumann kick)

=== Tulane ===
Rutgers Scarlet Knights at Tulane Green Wave

| Quarter | 1 | 2 | 3 | 4 | Total |
|---|---|---|---|---|---|
| Rutgers | 14 | 14 | 0 | 17 | 45 |
| Tulane | 7 | 11 | 3 | 19 | 40 |

at Superdome, New Orleans, Louisiana

- Date: November 11, 1995
- Game attendance: 16,098
- Recap, pg. 126

Game information
First quarter
- RUT - Battaglia 13-yard pass from Lucas (Mike-Mayer kick)
- TUL - King 1-yard run (Palazzo kick)
- RUT - Bosch 6-yard run (Mike-Mayer kick)

Second quarter

- TUL - Palazzo 27-yard field goal
- RUT - Presley 7-yard run (Mike-Mayer kick)
- TUL - Sowell 39-yard pass from King (Moorhead run)
- RUT - Battaglia 14-yard pass from Lucas (Mike-Mayer kick)

Third quarter

- TUL - Palazzo 47-yard field goal

Fourth quarter

- TUL - Sowell 9-yard run (Palazzo kick)
- RUT - Mike-Mayer 48-yard field goal
- RUT - Funderburk 31-yard pass from Lucas (Mike-Mayer kick)
- TUL - Alleman 24-yard pass from King (run failed)
- RUT - Lucas 1-yard run (Mike-Mayer kick)
- TUL - Dartez 1-yard run (pass failed)

=== Temple ===
Rutgers Scarlet Knights at Temple Owls

| Quarter | 1 | 2 | 3 | 4 | Total |
|---|---|---|---|---|---|
| Rutgers | 6 | 6 | 0 | 11 | 23 |
| Temple | 7 | 7 | 0 | 6 | 20 |

at Veterans Stadium, Philadelphia, Pennsylvania

- Date: November 18, 1995
- Game attendance: 3,733
- Recap, pg. 126

Game information
First quarter
- RUT - Williams 43-yard interception return (kick failed)
- TEM - Carter 16-yard pass from Burris (Michalski kick)

Second quarter

- TEM - Walker 54-yard pass from Burris (Michalski kick)
- RUT - Harper 8-yard pass from Lucas (pass failed)

Third quarter

- No scoring

Fourth quarter

- RUT - Kucowski 17-yard field goal
- TEM - Culbreath 42-yard run (run failed)
- RUT - Harper 13-yard pass from Lucas (Battaglia pass from Lucas)

=== Boston College ===
Boston College Eagles at Rutgers Scarlet Knights

| Quarter | 1 | 2 | 3 | 4 | Total |
|---|---|---|---|---|---|
| Boston College | 14 | 7 | 7 | 13 | 41 |
| Rutgers | 7 | 17 | 7 | 7 | 38 |

at Rutgers Stadium, Piscataway, New Jersey

- Date: November 24, 1995
- Game time: 11:00 a.m. EST
- Game attendance: 20,114
- Recap, pg. 127

Game information
First quarter
- BC - Watson 63 yard punt return (McGuire kick)
- RUT - Lucas 1 yard run (Mike-Mayer kick)
- BC - Pollack 11 yard pass from Hartsell (McGuire kick)

Second quarter

- RUT - Lucas 7 yard run (Mike-Mayer kick)
- BC - Walker 2 yard run (McGuire kick)
- RUT - Mike-Mayer 20 yard field goal
- RUT - Presly 8 yard run (Mike-Mayer kick)

Third quarter

- BC - Tardio 2 yard pass from Hartsell (McGuire kick)
- RUT - Presley 6 yard run (Kucowski kick)

Fourth quarter

- RUT - Battaglia 34 yard pass from Lucas (Kucowski kick)
- BC - Harding 8 yard pass from Hartsell (pass failed)
- BC - Pollack 7 yard pass from Hartsell (McGuire kick)

== Roster ==
1995 Rutgers Scarlet Knights football team roster
Players
Coaches
Offense

| Pos. | # | Name | Class |
|---|---|---|---|
| TE | 81 | Marco Battaglia | Sr |
| QB | 1 | Ray Lucas | Sr |

Defense

| Pos. | # | Name | Class |

Special teams

| Pos. | # | Name | Class |

Head coach

- Doug Graber

Coordinators/assistant coaches

- John Gutekunst
  (Defensive coordinator & defensive backs coach)

Legend

- (C) Team captain
- (S) Suspended
- (I) Ineligible
- Injured
- Redshirt
