= KJ Duff =

American football player (born 2005)

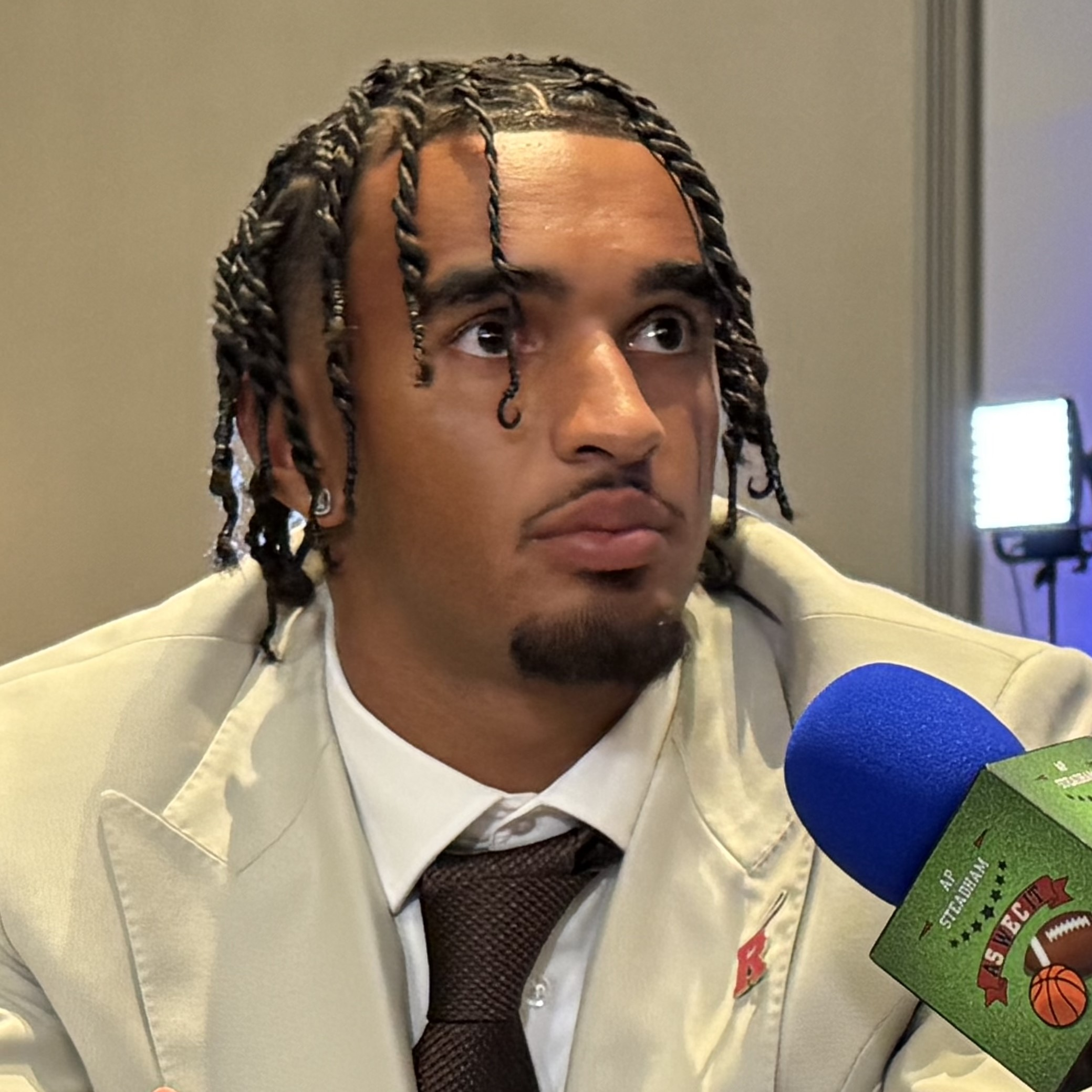
- Duff at 2026 Big Ten Media Day

No. 8 – Rutgers Scarlet Knights
- Position: Wide receiver
- Class: Junior

Personal information
- Born: December 6, 2005 (age 20)
- Listed height: 6 ft 6 in (1.98 m)
- Listed weight: 225 lb (102 kg)

Career information
- High school: St. Anthony's (South Huntington, New York)
- College: Rutgers (2024–present)

Awards and highlights
- Second-team All-Big Ten (2025)
- Stats at ESPN

Korey "KJ" Duff Jr. (born December 6, 2005) is an American college football wide receiver for the Rutgers Scarlet Knights.

== Early life ==
Duff attended St. Anthony's High School in South Huntington, New York. In his junior season, he hauled in 44 passes for 995 yards and 12 touchdowns. Coming out of high school, Duff was rated as a four-star recruit and committed to play college football for the Rutgers Scarlet Knights over schools such as Texas A&M, Miami, Pittsburgh, Arizona State, Duke, Georgia Tech, Maryland, Syracuse, Vanderbilt, and West Virginia.

== College career ==
Duff made his collegiate debut in the 2024 season opener against Howard, recording one reception for nine yards in a victory. The following week against Akron, he caught two passes for 29 yards and his first collegiate touchdown, a six-yard reception from Athan Kaliakmanis, in a 49–17 victory. In Week 8 against UCLA, Duff recorded a season-high 82 receiving yards on three receptions. In the Rate Bowl against Kansas State, he caught three passes for 58 yards in a 44–41 loss. He appeared in all 13 games with four starts, finishing the season with 27 receptions for 425 yards and one touchdown.

Duff began the 2025 season with touchdown receptions in each of his first two games, victories over Ohio and Miami (OH). In Week 3 against Norfolk State, he recorded six receptions for 119 yards. In Week 8 against Purdue, Duff had six receptions for a career-high 241 yards and one touchdown in a 27–24 victory, with his receiving total ranking second in program history for a single game. Duff finished the season with 60 receptions for 1,084 yards and seven touchdowns, starting all 12 games, and was named second-team All-Big Ten.

In the 2026 season opener against UMass, Duff recorded nine receptions for 196 yards and three touchdowns in a loss. In Week 2 against Boston College, Duff recorded eight receptions for 137 yards and two touchdowns. He became the first Rutgers player to record at least 120 receiving yards in three consecutive games dating back to the 2025 season. He also recorded his 100th career reception in the loss.

=== Statistics ===
Year	Team	Games		Receiving			
Year	Team	GP	GS	Rec	Yds	Avg	TD
2024	Rutgers	13	4	27	425	15.7	1
2025	Rutgers	12	12	60	1,084	18.1	7
2026	Rutgers	4	4	29	550	19.0	7
Career		29	20	116	2,059	17.8	15
