= 2004 Temple Owls football team =

American college football season

2004 Temple Owls football
- Conference: Big East Conference
- Record: 2–9 (1–5 Big East)
- Head coach: Bobby Wallace (7th season)
- Offensive coordinator: Willie J. Slater (1st season)
- Defensive coordinator: Raymond Monica (7th season)
- Captains: Troy Bennett; C. J. Blomvall; Ikey Chuku; Sadeke Konte; Lawrence Wade
- Home stadium: Lincoln Financial Field

2004 Big East Conference football standings
	Conf.			Overall
Team	W		L	W		L
No. 21 Boston College +	4	–	2	9	–	3
No. 25 Pittsburgh $+	4	–	2	8	–	4
West Virginia +	4	–	2	8	–	4
Syracuse +	4	–	2	6	–	6
Connecticut	3	–	3	8	–	4
Rutgers	1	–	5	4	–	7
Temple	1	–	5	2	–	9
$ – BCS representative as conference champion; + – Conference co-champions; Rankings from AP Poll

The 2004 Temple Owls football team represented Temple University as a member of the Big East Conference during the 2004 NCAA Division I-A football season. Led by seventh-year head coach Bobby Wallace, the Owls compiled an overall record of 2–9 with a mark of 1–5 in conference play, tying for sixth place at the bottom of the Big East standings. Temple played home games at the Lincoln Financial Field in Philadelphia.

== Schedule ==
Date	Time	Opponent	Site	TV	Result	Attendance	Source
September 4	12:00 pm	No. 16 Virginia*	Lincoln Financial Field; Philadelphia, PA	ESPN2	L 14–44	20,154	
September 11	6:00 pm	at No. 23 Maryland	Byrd Stadium; College Park, MD		L 22–45	51,292	
September 18	2:00 pm	Florida A&M*	Lincoln Financial Field; Philadelphia, PA		W 38–7	17,104	
September 25	7:00 pm	at Toledo*	Glass Bowl; Toledo, OH		L 17–45	24,836	
October 2	1:00 pm	Bowling Green*	Lincoln Financial Field; Philadelphia, PA		L 16–70	12,316	
October 9	12:00 pm	Pittsburgh^{†}	Lincoln Financial Field; Philadelphia, PA	ESPN Plus	L 22–27	19,517	
October 16	12:00 pm	at Rutgers	Rutgers Stadium; Piscataway, NJ	ESPN Plus	L 6–16	31,021	
October 23	12:00 pm	at Connecticut	Rentschler Field; East Hartford, CT		L 31–45	40,000	
November 6	1:00 pm	at No. 15 West Virginia	Milan Puskar Stadium; Morgantown, WV		L 21–42	52,108	
November 13	12:00 pm	Syracuse	Lincoln Financial Field; Philadelphia, PA	ESPN Plus	W 34–24	15,564	
November 20	12:00 pm	No. 19 Boston College	Lincoln Financial Field; Philadelphia, PA	ESPN Plus	L 17–34	14,081	
*Non-conference game; ^{†}Homecoming; Rankings from AP Poll released prior to the game; All times are in Eastern time
