= Marcus Easley =

American football player (born 1987)

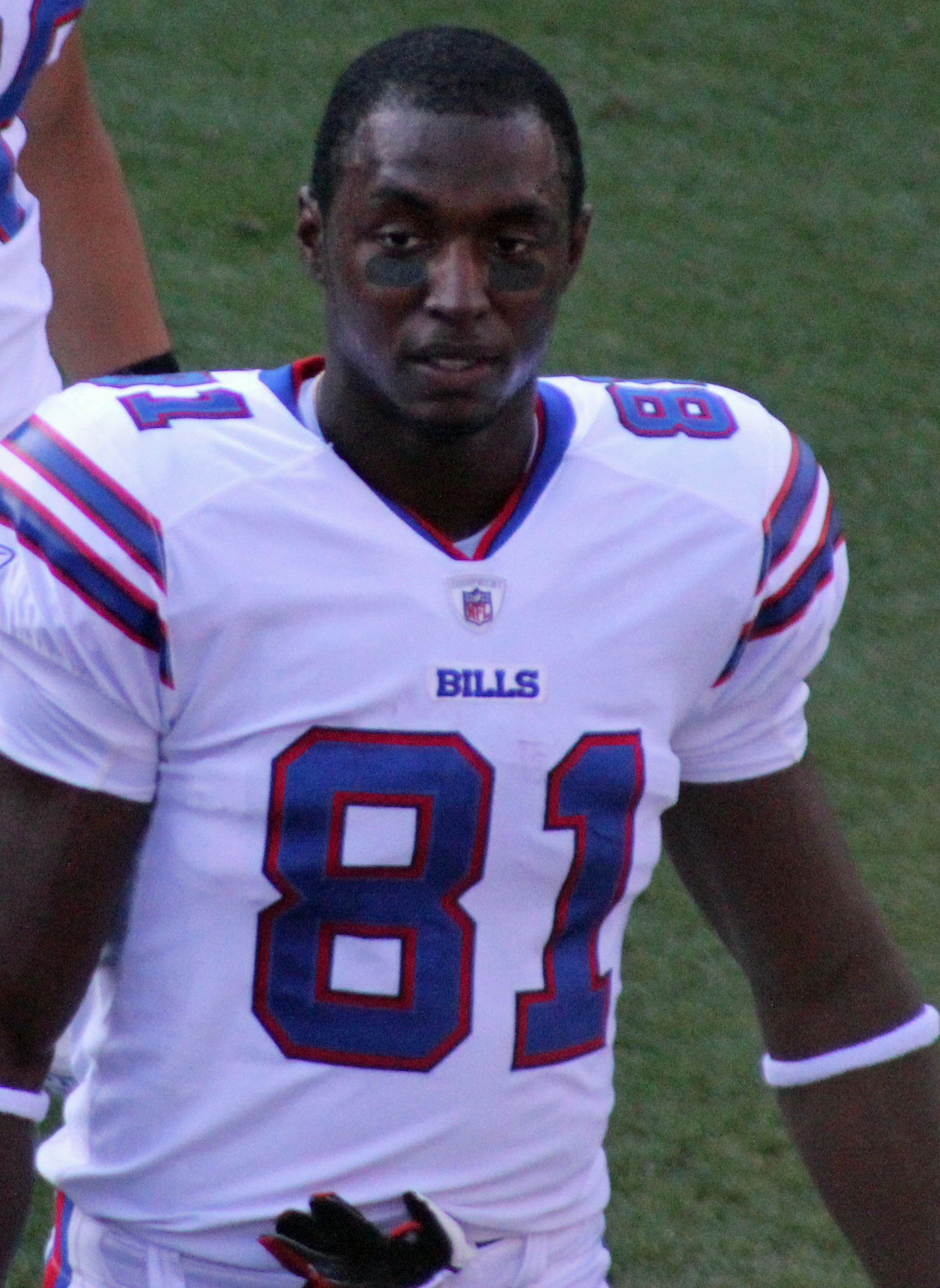
- Easley with the Buffalo Bills in 2011

No. 81
- Position: Wide receiver / Special teamer

Personal information
- Born: November 2, 1987 (age 39); Bridgeport, Connecticut, U.S.
- Listed height: 6 ft 2 in (1.88 m)
- Listed weight: 225 lb (102 kg)

Career information
- High school: Bunnell (Stratford, Connecticut)
- College: Connecticut
- NFL draft: 2010: 4th round, 107th overall pick

Career history
- Buffalo Bills (2010–2016)

Career NFL statistics
- Receptions: 3
- Receiving yards: 71
- Receiving touchdowns: 1
- Total tackles: 49
- Forced fumbles: 1
- Stats at Pro Football Reference

Marcus Landon Easley (born November 2, 1987) is an American former professional football player who was a wide receiver and special teamer for the Buffalo Bills of the National Football League (NFL). He played college football for the Connecticut Huskies and was selected by the Buffalo Bills in the fourth round of the 2010 NFL draft.

== College career ==
A graduate of Frank Scott Bunnell High School in Stratford, Connecticut, in 2005, Easley was offered an academic scholarship to the University of Connecticut. He didn't end up receiving the scholarship, but was accepted to the school. He joined the UConn football team as a walk-on player, but didn't play until his sophomore year, when he played in 10 games, primarily on special teams and as a backup wide receiver. On September 8, 2007, he posted his first and only catch for the season, a 10-yard gain against Maine. In his junior year he saw action in 12 games, starting 4 of them, and ended the season with 4 catches for 94 yards. As a senior he played in all 13 games, starting 7 of them, and leading the team with 48 catches for 893 yards and 8 touchdowns. He scored his first touchdown on October 10, 2009, against Pitt. On October 24, 2009, Easley posted a career-high 157 receiving yards in a 28–24 loss at West Virginia. He had a career-high 8 catches on December 5 in a 29–27 home win against South Florida. Following the season, he was invited to the 2010 Texas vs The Nation all-star game.

He ended his college career with 53 receptions for 997 yards and 8 touchdowns.

== Professional career ==
Easley was selected in the fourth round, 107th overall by the Buffalo Bills in the 2010 NFL draft. He was the first Connecticut Huskies wide receiver to be drafted in the National Football League. He was the only wide receiver taken by the Buffalo Bills in his draft class.

Before the start of his rookie season, he was placed on injured reserve after having surgery for a torn meniscus.

Easley was put on injured reserve on September 13, 2011, after it was announced that he had a heart ailment, missing his second straight season.

On August 31, 2012, Easley was cut by the Bills and signed to their practice squad the following day. He was promoted back to the 53-man roster on November 6, 2012. He made his NFL debut on December 2, 2012, in a home game against the Jacksonville Jaguars. He returned his first kickoff for 55 yards, setting up a 26-yard touchdown drive. He again saw action on December 16, 2012, on special teams, but left the game with a hamstring injury. He took the field again on December 30, 2012, against the New York Jets, posting a forced fumble and two special teams tackles.

Easley earned a spot on the Bills 2013 roster. He played in all 16 games and led the NFL with 22 special teams tackles. On September 29, 2013, in a home game against the Baltimore Ravens he recorded a game-high four special teams tackles. On November 10, 2013, against the Pittsburgh Steelers he posted his first NFL catch. He ended the game with 2 catches for 13 yards.

In the 2014 season, Easley saw action in 9 games on special teams, recording 9 special teams tackles.

On December 27, 2015, during a game against the Dallas Cowboys, Easley suffered a dislocated kneecap and broke his knee in three places. He was carted to the locker room. He was placed on injured reserve the next day.

On March 8, 2017, the Buffalo Bills released Easley after he spent six years with the team.
