= 2004 Boston College Eagles football team =

American college football season

2004 Boston College Eagles football
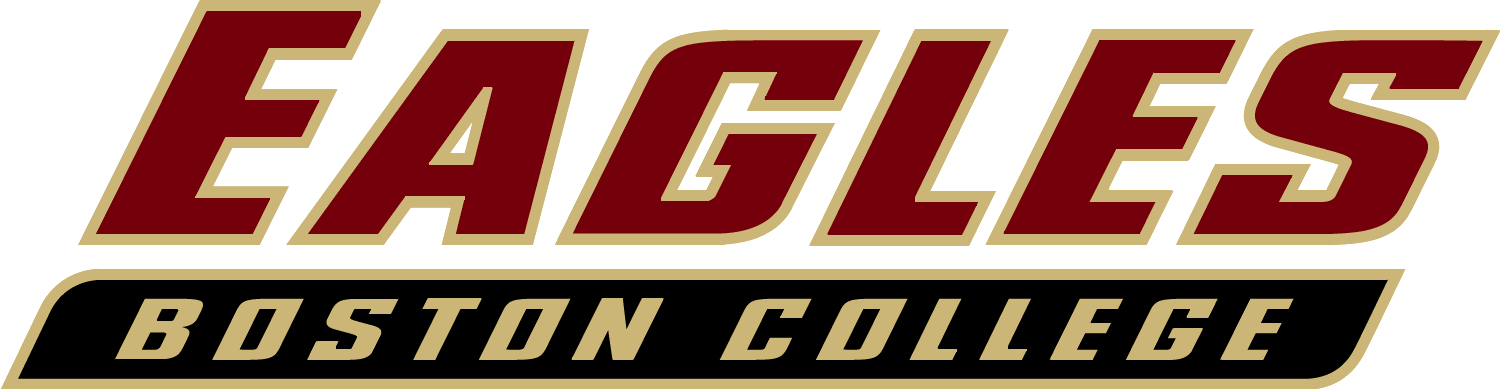

Big East co-champion Continental Tire Bowl champion Lambert-Meadowlands Trophy

Continental Tire Bowl, W 37–24 vs. North Carolina
- Conference: Big East Conference

Ranking
- Coaches: No. 21
- AP: No. 21
- Record: 9–3 (4–2 Big East)
- Head coach: Tom O'Brien (8th season)
- Offensive coordinator: Dana Bible (6th season)
- Offensive scheme: Pro-style
- Defensive coordinator: Frank Spaziani (6th season)
- Base defense: 4–3
- Captains: Tim Bulman; Dave Kashetta; Mathias Kiwanuka
- Home stadium: Alumni Stadium

2004 Big East Conference football standings
	Conf.			Overall
Team	W		L	W		L
No. 21 Boston College +	4	–	2	9	–	3
No. 25 Pittsburgh $+	4	–	2	8	–	4
West Virginia +	4	–	2	8	–	4
Syracuse +	4	–	2	6	–	6
Connecticut	3	–	3	8	–	4
Rutgers	1	–	5	4	–	7
Temple	1	–	5	2	–	9
$ – BCS representative as conference champion; + – Conference co-champions; Rankings from AP Poll

The 2004 Boston College Eagles football team represented Boston College during the 2004 NCAA Division I-A football season. Boston College was a member of the Big East Conference, with this season being their last before their move to the Atlantic Coast Conference. The Eagles played their home games in 2004 at Alumni Stadium in Chestnut Hill, Massachusetts, which has been their home stadium since 1957.

== Schedule ==
Date	Time	Opponent	Rank	Site	TV	Result	Attendance
September 2	8:00 p.m.	at Ball State*		Scheumann Stadium; Muncie, IN		W 19–11	23,718
September 11	8:00 p.m.	Penn State*		Alumni Stadium; Chestnut Hill, MA	ABC	W 21–7	44,500
September 17	8:00 p.m.	Connecticut		Alumni Stadium; Chestnut Hill, MA	ESPN2	W 27–7	42,564
September 25	12:00 p.m.	at Wake Forest*		Groves Stadium; Winston-Salem, NC	ESPN2	L 14–17	29,461
October 2	1:00 p.m.	No. 19 (I-AA) UMass*		Alumni Stadium; Chestnut Hill, MA (rivalry)	NESN	W 29–7	43,262
October 16	12:00 p.m.	at Pittsburgh		Heinz Field; Pittsburgh, PA	ESPN2	L 17–20 ^{OT}	34,071
October 23	2:30 p.m.	at No. 24 Notre Dame*		Notre Dame Stadium; Notre Dame, IN (Holy War)	NBC	W 24–23	80,795
November 6	3:30 p.m.	Rutgers	No. 24	Alumni Stadium; Chestnut Hill, MA	ESPN Plus	W 21–10	41,126
November 13	12:00 p.m.	at No. 13 West Virginia	No. 21	Milan Puskar Stadium; Morgantown, WV	ABC	W 36–17	58,118
November 20	12:00 p.m.	at Temple	No. 19	Lincoln Financial Field; Philadelphia, PA	ESPN Plus	W 34–17	14,081
November 27	1:00 p.m.	Syracuse	No. 17	Alumni Stadium; Chestnut Hill, MA	ABC	L 17–43	44,500
December 30	1:00 p.m.	vs. North Carolina*	No. 25	Bank of America Stadium; Charlotte, NC (Continental Tire Bowl)	ESPN2	W 37–24	73,258
*Non-conference game; Rankings from AP Poll released prior to the game; All times are in Eastern time

== Rankings ==
Ranking movements Legend: ██ Increase in ranking ██ Decrease in ranking — = Not ranked RV = Received votes
	Week															
Poll	Pre	1	2	3	4	5	6	7	8	9	10	11	12	13	14	Final
AP	RV	RV	RV	RV	—	RV	RV	—	25	24	21	19	17	23	25	21
Coaches	RV	RV	RV	RV	RV	RV	RV	—	RV	25	21	19	19	RV	RV	21
BCS	Not released							—	—	25	23	21	21	—	—	Not released
