= Frank Scott Bunnell High School =

Location
- 1 Bulldog Boulevard; Stratford, Connecticut 06614; United States; 41.2249°N 73.1392°W

Information
- Type: Public school
- Motto: Bulldog Strong!
- Established: 1960 (66 years ago)
- School district: Stratford Public Schools
- CEEB code: 070756
- Principal: Dr. Katie Graf
- Teaching staff: 80.50 (FTE)
- Grades: 9 - 12
- Enrollment: 1,057 (2023-2024)
- Student to teacher ratio: 12.97
- Colors: blue, gray, white
- Athletics: South West Conference
- Mascot: "Mark the Bulldog"
- Nickname: Bulldogs
- Rival: Stratford Red Devils
- Accreditation: NEASC
- Newspaper: Scribe
- Yearbook: Laurel
- Website: www.stratfordk12.org/o/bhs

Frank Scott Bunnell High School is an accredited high school in Stratford, Connecticut, United States. The school serves students in grades 9 through 12 as part of Stratford Public Schools. The school mascot is the bulldog, and the school colors are blue, gray and white.

== Notable alumni ==
- John Hirschbeck (1972) Major League Baseball umpire
- Mark Hirschbeck (1977) Major League Baseball umpire
- Javier Colon (1995) American singer/songwriter; winner of season 1 of The Voice
- Nakiea Miller (1997) professional basketball player
- Marcus Easley (2005) NFL football player
- Mark Harrison (2009) professional football player

== Recognitions ==
The Bunnell High School Football team won back to back state championships in 2006 and 2007.

== In popular culture ==
The school's campus was used as the primary filming location for the Disney+ film Chang Can Dunk.

== See also ==
- Stratford High School
