= Leonte Carroo =

American football player (born 1994)

No. 88
- Position: Wide receiver

Personal information
- Born: January 24, 1994 (age 32); Edison, New Jersey, U.S.
- Listed height: 6 ft 1 in (1.85 m)
- Listed weight: 215 lb (98 kg)

Career information
- High school: Don Bosco Prep (Ramsey, New Jersey)
- College: Rutgers (2012–2015)
- NFL draft: 2016: 3rd round, 86th overall pick

Career history
- Miami Dolphins (2016–2018)

Career NFL statistics
- Receptions: 12
- Receiving yards: 192
- Receiving touchdowns: 2
- Stats at Pro Football Reference

Leonte Carroo (born January 24, 1994) is an American former professional football player who was a wide receiver for the Miami Dolphins of the National Football League (NFL). He played college football for the Rutgers Scarlet Knights and was selected by the Dolphins in the third round of the 2016 NFL draft.

== Early life ==
Carroo attended Don Bosco Preparatory High School in Ramsey, New Jersey, where he played high school football. He committed to Rutgers University to play college football.

== College career ==
As a true freshman at Rutgers in 2012, Carroo played in all 13 games. He did not record a reception but did have a blocked punt and recorded one tackle on special teams.

As a sophomore, he started the Scarlet Knight's season opener against Fresno State and finished the loss with five catches for 135 receiving yards and three touchdowns. Carroo caught his first career pass from Gary Nova and scored a 69-yard touchdown on it. On November 11, 2013, he caught a season-high seven passes for a season-high 147-yards and two touchdowns against the Temple. He played in 10 games with three starts and had 28 receptions for 478 yards and nine touchdowns.

He returned the following year as a junior and caught six passes for a season-high 151 receiving yards and a touchdown in Rutger's 41–38 victory over Washington State. On September 27, 2014, Carroo made a season-high seven receptions for 140-yards and a season-high three touchdowns against Tulane. He finished 2014 starting all 13 games, recording 55 receptions for 1,086 yards and 10 touchdowns.

During the first game of his senior year in 2015, Carroo broke Rutgers career receiving touchdown record with 22 touchdown receptions. He finished the Scarlet Knight's season opening 63–13 victory over the FCS's Norfolk State with three receptions, 129 receiving yards, and three touchdowns. On September 13, he was suspended indefinitely by Rutgers after he was arrested and charged with simple assault for his role in an altercation that occurred after the team's game against Washington State. After charges were dropped, he was reinstated on October 7. He returned in time for Rutger's game against #4 Michigan State on October 10, 2015, and finished the 31–28 loss with a season-high seven catches for 134 receiving yards and a season-high three touchdowns. On November 28, 2016, he played in his last collegiate game and caught a season-high seven passes for a career-high 181-yards and a touchdown in a 41–46 loss to Maryland. For the season he played in eight games, recording 39 receptions for 809 yards and 10 touchdowns.

He finished his career at Rutgers with 122 receptions, 2,373 receiving yards, and a school-record 29 receiving touchdowns in his career. He also had three solo tackles and a pass deflection.

=== College statistics ===
Year	Team	GP	Receiving		
Year	Team	GP	Rec	Yards	TDs
2013	Rutgers	9	28	478	9
2014	Rutgers	13	55	1,086	10
2015	Rutgers	8	39	809	10
Totals		30	122	2,373	29

== Professional career ==
Immediately after finishing his collegiate career at Rutgers, some draft analysts projected Carroo as a second, third, or fourth round selection. He was invited to the NFL Scouting Combine but was not able to complete the entire workout due to an ankle injury. At Rutgers's Pro Day, he did not perform any drills or workouts due to the same ankle injury he suffered in October 2015. Although scouts were impressed with his physical traits, NFL size, ball tracking abilities, run blocking, and strong hands many were still worried about his character and speed.

Pre-draft measurables
Height	Weight	Arm length	Hand span	40-yard dash	10-yard split	20-yard split	Vertical jump	Broad jump	Bench press
5 ft 11 7/8 in (1.83 m)	211 lb (96 kg)	31 3/8 in (0.80 m)	9 5/8 in (0.24 m)	4.50 s	1.59 s	2.63 s	35 1/2 in (0.90 m)	10 ft 0 in (3.05 m)	14 reps
All values from NFL Combine

Carroo was selected by the Miami Dolphins in the third round, 86th overall, in the 2016 NFL draft. The Dolphins traded their 2016 sixth round pick (186th overall), their 2017 third round pick, and their 2017 fourth round pick in order get the 86th overall pick to draft Carroo. Carroo was upset after falling to the third round.

On May 24, 2016, the Dolphins signed Carroo to a four-year, $3.10 million contract with a signing bonus of $700,388.

Carroo entered training camp battling to be the fourth wide receiver on the depth chart behind veterans Jarvis Landry, Kenny Stills, and DeVante Parker. He entered the regular season as the fourth receiver after defeating Griff Whalen, Jakeem Grant, and Rashawn Scott for the position.

On September 10, 2016, Carroo made his first career start in the Dolphins' season and made two receptions for 14-yards in a 12–10 loss to the Seattle Seahawks. He started in place of DeVante Parker who was unable to play due to a hamstring injury. The following nine games, he was unable to log a reception and only received two targets after Parker returned from injury. On November 27, 2016, Carroo made a game-winning 15-yard touchdown catch after replacing Parker who left the game with an injury. It was his first career touchdown and sealed the Dolphins' 31–24 victory over the San Francisco 49ers.

In 2017, Carroo played in 14 games, recording seven receptions for 69 yards. He was placed on the reserve/non-football injury list on December 28, 2017, after having undisclosed emergency surgery on Christmas.

On September 1, 2018, Carroo was waived by the Dolphins and was signed to the practice squad the next day. He was promoted to the active roster on October 24, 2018. On the season, he had two receptions for 94 yards and a touchdown.

After not being tendered as a restricted free agent by the Dolphins after the 2018 season, Carroo was suspended the first four games of the 2019 NFL season in June 2019. He was reinstated from suspension on October 1, 2019, but remained a free agent.

== Personal life ==
At age 13, Carroo's mother sent him to live with the Yankovich family in Ramsey, New Jersey. His parents decided that sending him 70 minutes away from their home in Edison, New Jersey was the best choice and much safer than staying in his hometown. He lived with the Yankovich's until he graduated from Don Bosco Prep in 2012. After graduating, he chose to attend Rutgers University in New Brunswick, New Jersey to be closer to his sister Kenisha who lived in Edison.
