= Jacque LaPrarie =

American football player

Jacque LaPrarie was an American football player for the Rutgers University Scarlet Knights, born on July 6, 1963. He was the Rutgers starting quarterback in 1982 and 1983, leading the team in passing yards in both years. He died on 23 December 2024.

== College career ==
LaPrarie started his Rutgers career in 1981 and became the Scarlet Knights' primary quarterback as a sophomore in 1982. During the first game of the 1982 season, he completed 16 of 24 passes for 119 yards in a 31–8 loss to Syracuse. He also had 58 rushing yards. Rutgers' second game was against Penn State; they lost 49–14, and LaPrarie threw one touchdown pass. On October 9, in a win over Army, he was 9 for 15 passing with 129 yards. Two weeks after that, he was 12 for 19 with 196 passing yards and two touchdowns, as Rutgers defeated Colgate to move to 4–3 on the season. The team finished with a record of 5–6. Overall, LaPrarie completed 100 of 186 passes with 1,164 yards, 7 touchdowns, and 17 interceptions. He led the team in both passing yards and total offense yards (1,333). His 17 interceptions set a Scarlet Knights team record that stood for 19 years.

LaPrarie remained the starting quarterback in 1983. In the first game of the season, against Connecticut, he led Rutgers to a 22–5 victory with 173 passing yards and one touchdown. However, the team lost its next four games. LaPrarie threw one touchdown pass in a loss to Army, which sent the Scarlet Knights to 1–4. They eventually finished the season at 3–8; LaPrarie was 104 for 203 passing and had 1,275 yards, 7 touchdown passes, and 15 interceptions. He was Rutgers' leader in passing yards and total offense yards (1,328) for the second straight year.

In 1984, LaPrarie played as a defensive back, as he was replaced at quarterback by Eric Hochberg. That was LaPrarie's final season on the Scarlet Knights. He finished his Rutgers career with 35 interceptions, which broke Len Gasiencia's team record of 30.
