= 2005 Gator Bowl =

2005 Toyota Gator Bowl
- 60th Gator Bowl
Florida State Seminoles	West Virginia Mountaineers
(8-3)	(8-3)
ACC	Big East
30	18
Head coach: Bobby Bowden	Head coach: Rich Rodriguez
AP / Coaches / BCS; 17 / 15 / 16	Coaches 23
	1	2	3	4	Total
Florida State	10	3	10	7	30
West Virginia	12	0	3	3	18
- Date: January 1, 2005
- Season: 2004
- Stadium: Alltel Stadium
- Location: Jacksonville, Florida
- MVP: Leon Washington; Kay-Jay Harris
- Referee: R.G. Detillier (C-USA)
- Attendance: 70,112

United States TV coverage
- Network: NBC
- Announcers: Tom Hammond and Pat Haden

The 2005 Gator Bowl was a post-season college football bowl game between the Florida State Seminoles and the West Virginia Mountaineers on January 1, 2005, at Alltel Stadium in Jacksonville, Florida. It was the final game of the 2004 NCAA Division I FBS football season for each team and resulted in a 30–18 Florida State Victory. West Virginia represented the Big East Conference while Florida State represented the Atlantic Coast Conference (ACC).
