= 2004 Syracuse Orange football team =

American college football season

2004 Syracuse Orange football

Big East co-champion

Champs Sports Bowl, L 14–51 vs. Georgia Tech
- Conference: Big East Conference
- Record: 0–6, 6 wins vacated (0–2 Big East, 4 wins vacated)
- Head coach: Paul Pasqualoni (14th season)
- Offensive coordinator: George DeLeone (16th season)
- Defensive coordinator: Steve Dunlap (1st season)
- Captains: Julian Pollard; Walter Reyes; Matt Tarullo
- Home stadium: Carrier Dome

2004 Big East Conference football standings
	Conf.			Overall
Team	W		L	W		L
No. 21 Boston College +	4	–	2	9	–	3
No. 25 Pittsburgh $+	4	–	2	8	–	4
West Virginia +	4	–	2	8	–	4
Syracuse +	4	–	2	6	–	6
Connecticut	3	–	3	8	–	4
Rutgers	1	–	5	4	–	7
Temple	1	–	5	2	–	9
$ – BCS representative as conference champion; + – Conference co-champions; Rankings from AP Poll

The 2004 Syracuse Orange football team represented Syracuse University as a member of the Big East Conference during the 2004 NCAA Division I-A football season. Led by Paul Pasqualoni in his 14th and final season as head coach, the Orange compiled an overall record of 6–6 with a mark of 4–2 in conference play, sharing the Big East title with Boston College, Pittsburgh, and West Virginia. Syracuse was invited to the Georgia Tech, where the Orange lost to Georgia Tech. The team played home games at the Carrier Dome in Syracuse, New York.

This was the first season in which Syracuse used the nickname of Orange. Previously, Syracuse had respectively used "Orangemen" for men's sports, including football, and "Orangewomen" for women's sports.

In 2015, Syracuse vacated the six wins from this season among others from the 2005 and 2006 seasons following an eight-year investigation, as the National Collegiate Athletic Association (NCAA) found that some players who committed academic fraud participated in the wins.

== Schedule ==
Date	Time	Opponent	Site	TV	Result	Attendance	Source
September 5	1:30 pm	at No. 25 Purdue*	Ross–Ade Stadium; West Lafayette, IN	ABC	L 0–51	56,827	
September 11	6:00 pm	at Buffalo*	University at Buffalo Stadium; Amherst, NY		W 37–17 (vacated)	29,013	
September 18	12:00 pm	Cincinnati*	Carrier Dome; Syracuse, NY	ESPN Plus	W 19–7 (vacated)	32,893	
September 25	3:30 pm	at No. 12 Virginia*	Scott Stadium; Charlottesville, VA		L 10–31	59,699	
October 2	12:00 pm	Rutgers	Carrier Dome; Syracuse, NY	ESPN Plus	W 41–31 (vacated)	40,153	
October 9	7:00 pm	No. 8 Florida State*	Carrier Dome; Syracuse, NY	ESPN2	L 13–17	40,359	
October 21	7:30 pm	at No. 15 West Virginia	Milan Puskar Stadium; Morgantown, WV (rivalry)	ESPN	L 6–27	52,909	
October 30	1:30 pm	Connecticut	Carrier Dome; Syracuse, NY (rivalry)		W 42–30 (vacated)	34,545	
November 6	12:00 pm	Pittsburgh	Carrier Dome; Syracuse, NY (rivalry)	ESPN Plus	W 38–31 (vacated)	37,211	
November 13	12:00 pm	at Temple	Lincoln Financial Field; Philadelphia, PA	ESPN Plus	L 24–34	15,564	
November 27	1:00 pm	at No. 17 Boston College	Alumni Stadium; Chestnut Hill, MA	ABC	W 43–17 (vacated)	44,500	
December 21	7:45 pm	vs. Georgia Tech*	Florida Citrus Bowl; Orlando, FL (Champs Sports Bowl)	ESPN	L 14–51	28,237	
*Non-conference game; Rankings from AP Poll released prior to the game; All times are in Eastern time
