= 2004 West Virginia Mountaineers football team =

American college football season

2004 West Virginia Mountaineers football

Big East co-champion

Gator Bowl, L 18–30 vs. Florida State
- Conference: Big East Conference
- Record: 8–4 (4–2 Big East)
- Head coach: Rich Rodriguez (4th season)
- Offensive coordinator: Calvin Magee (1st season)
- Offensive scheme: Spread option
- Defensive coordinator: Jeff Casteel (3rd season)
- Base defense: 3–3–5
- Home stadium: Milan Puskar Stadium

2004 Big East Conference football standings
	Conf.			Overall
Team	W		L	W		L
No. 21 Boston College +	4	–	2	9	–	3
No. 25 Pittsburgh $+	4	–	2	8	–	4
West Virginia +	4	–	2	8	–	4
Syracuse +	4	–	2	6	–	6
Connecticut	3	–	3	8	–	4
Rutgers	1	–	5	4	–	7
Temple	1	–	5	2	–	9
$ – BCS representative as conference champion; + – Conference co-champions; Rankings from AP Poll

The 2004 West Virginia Mountaineers football team represented West Virginia University as a member of the Big East Conference during the 2004 NCAA Division I-A football season. Led by fourth-year head coach Rich Rodriguez, the Mountaineers compiled an overall record of 8–4 with a mark of 4–2 in conference play, sharing the Big East title with Boston College, Pittsburgh and Syracuse. West Virginia was invited the Gator Bowl, where the Mountaineers lost to Florida State. The team played home games at Milan Puskar Stadium in Morgantown, West Virginia.

== Schedule ==
Date	Time	Opponent	Rank	Site	TV	Result	Attendance	Source
September 4	6:00 p.m.	East Carolina*	No. 10	Milan Puskar Stadium; Morgantown, WV	ESPN Plus	W 56–23	59,172	
September 11	6:00 p.m.	at UCF*	No. 10	Florida Citrus Bowl; Orlando, FL		W 45–20	32,224	
September 18	12:00 p.m.	No. 21 Maryland*	No. 7	Milan Puskar Stadium; Morgantown, WV	ESPN2	W 19–16 ^{OT}	60,358	
September 25	12:00 p.m.	James Madison*	No. 6	Milan Puskar Stadium; Morgantown, WV		W 45–10	56,609	
October 2	12:00 p.m.	at Virginia Tech*	No. 6	Lane Stadium; Blacksburg, VA	ESPN	L 13–19	65,115	
October 13	7:30 p.m.	at Connecticut	No. 17	Rentschler Field; East Hartford, CT	ESPN	W 31–19	40,000	
October 21	7:30 p.m.	Syracuse	No. 15	Milan Puskar Stadium; Morgantown, WV (rivalry)	ESPN	W 27–6	52,909	
October 30	12:00 p.m.	at Rutgers	No. 15	Rutgers Stadium; Piscataway, New Jersey	ESPN Plus	W 35–30	35,079	
November 6	1:00 p.m.	Temple	No. 15	Milan Puskar Stadium; Morgantown, WV	ESPN Plus	W 42–21	52,108	
November 13	12:00 p.m.	No. 21 Boston College	No. 13	Milan Puskar Stadium; Morgantown, WV	ABC	L 17–36	58,118	
November 25	8:00 p.m.	at Pittsburgh	No. 21	Heinz Field; Pittsburgh, PA (Backyard Brawl)	ESPN	L 13–16	52,641	
January 1	1:00 p.m.	vs. No. 17 Florida State*		Alltel Stadium; Jacksonville, FL (Gator Bowl)	NBC	L 18–30	70,112	
*Non-conference game; Rankings from AP Poll released prior to the game; All times are in Eastern time

== Roster ==
The 2004 team featured Rasheed Marshall at quarterback, Kay-Jay Harris at running back, Chris Henry at receiver, and a with Pacman Jones (who also played returner), Mike Lorello, Boo McLee, Jahmile Addae, Eric Wicks, and Alton McCann. Brandon Myles also played receiver behind Henry.
