= 2004 Rutgers Scarlet Knights football team =

American college football season

2004 Rutgers Scarlet Knights football
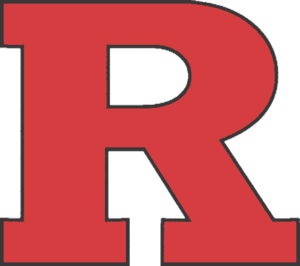
- Conference: Big East Conference
- Record: 4–7 (1–5 Big East)
- Head coach: Greg Schiano (4th season)
- Offensive coordinator: Craig Ver Steeg (2nd season)
- Offensive scheme: Pro-style
- Defensive coordinator: Paul Ferraro (4th season)
- Base defense: 4–3
- Home stadium: Rutgers Stadium

2004 Big East Conference football standings
	Conf.			Overall
Team	W		L	W		L
No. 21 Boston College +	4	–	2	9	–	3
No. 25 Pittsburgh $+	4	–	2	8	–	4
West Virginia +	4	–	2	8	–	4
Syracuse +	4	–	2	6	–	6
Connecticut	3	–	3	8	–	4
Rutgers	1	–	5	4	–	7
Temple	1	–	5	2	–	9
$ – BCS representative as conference champion; + – Conference co-champions; Rankings from AP Poll

The 2004 Rutgers Scarlet Knights football team represented Rutgers University in the 2004 NCAA Division I FBS football season. The Scarlet Knights were led by fourth-year head coach Greg Schiano and played their home games at Rutgers Stadium. They were a member of the Big East Conference. They finished the season 4–7, 1–5 in Big East play to finish in a tie with Temple for last place.

== Schedule ==
Date	Time	Opponent	Site	TV	Result	Attendance
September 4	3:30 pm	Michigan State*	Rutgers Stadium; Piscataway, NJ	ABC	W 19–14	42,612
September 11	7:00 pm	No. 19 (I-AA) New Hampshire*	Rutgers Stadium; Piscataway, NJ	MSG	L 24–35	31,615
September 18	7:00 pm	Kent State*	Rutgers Stadium; Piscataway, NJ	MSG	W 29–21	25,415
October 2	12:00 pm	at Syracuse	Carrier Dome; Syracuse, NY	ESPN Plus	L 31–41	40,153
October 9	8:00 pm	at Vanderbilt*	Vanderbilt Stadium; Nashville, TN	MSG	W 37–34	28,342
October 16	12:00 pm	Temple^{†}	Rutgers Stadium; Piscataway, NJ	ESPN Plus	W 16–6	31,021
October 23	12:00 pm	at Pittsburgh	Heinz Field; Pittsburgh, PA	ESPN Plus	L 17–41	41,232
October 30	12:00 pm	No. 15 West Virginia	Rutgers Stadium; Piscataway, NJ	ESPN Plus	L 30–35	35,079
November 6	3:30 pm	at No. 24 Boston College	Alumni Stadium; Chestnut Hill, MA	ESPN Plus	L 10–21	41,126
November 20	1:30 pm	at Navy*	Navy–Marine Corps Memorial Stadium; Annapolis, MD	CSTV	L 21–54	33,615
November 25	10:00 am	Connecticut	Rutgers Stadium; Piscataway, NJ	ESPN2	L 35–41	20,224
*Non-conference game; ^{†}Homecoming; Rankings from AP Poll released prior to the game; All times are in Eastern time
