= Craig Ver Steeg =

American football coach (born 1960)

Baltimore Ravens
- Title: Senior football analyst/game planning

Personal information
- Born: September 11, 1960 (age 66); Redondo Beach, California, U.S.

Career information
- High school: Redondo High School
- College: USC

Career history
- Redondo High School (1980–1982) Assistant coach; USC (1984–1985) Graduate assistant; Utah (1986) Graduate assistant; Utah (1987–1989) Quarterbacks coach & recruiting coordinator; Cincinnati (1990) Wide receivers coach; Cincinnati (1991) Wide receivers coach & recruiting coordinator; Cincinnati (1992–1993) Quarterbacks coach & recruiting coordinator; Harvard (1994–1995) Pass game coordinator/quarterbacks coach/wide receivers coach & recruiting coordinator; Chicago Bears (1996) Offensive assistant & quality control coach; Illinois (1997–2000) Quarterbacks coach & recruiting coordinator; Utah (2001–2002) Offensive coordinator & quarterbacks coach; Rutgers (2003–2005) Offensive coordinator & quarterbacks coach; Rutgers (2006) Co-offensive coordinator & running backs coach; Rutgers (2007) Running backs coach; Baltimore Ravens (2008–2010) Offensive assistant; Baltimore Ravens (2011) Offensive assistant & quarterbacks coach; Baltimore Ravens (2012–2018) Senior offensive assistant; Baltimore Ravens (2019–2020) Senior offensive assistant & running backs coach; Baltimore Ravens (2021–2022) Running backs coach; Baltimore Ravens (2023–present) Senior football analyst/game planning

Awards and highlights
- Super Bowl champion (XLVII)

Craig Ver Steeg (born September 11, 1960) is an American football coach for the Baltimore Ravens of the National Football League (NFL). He also served as an assistant coach at the college level for Utah, Rutgers and Harvard.

== Coaching career ==
=== USC ===
After a few years coaching at his former high school, Ver Steeg began his collegiate coaching career at his alma mater, USC, as a graduate assistant.

=== Utah (first stint) ===
In 1986, Ver Steeg joined the Utes’ staff as a graduate assistant, mostly working with quarterbacks. He continued to coach them his entire tenure with Utah. In 1988 he was given the additional title of recruiting coordinator.

=== Cincinnati ===
In 1990 Ver Steeg became a member of the Bearcats staff as the team’s wide receivers coach. In 1991 he added the title of recruiting coordinator. In 1992 he switched from coaching the wide receivers to the quarterbacks while retaining his role as the team’s recruiting coordinator.

=== Harvard ===
In 1994 and 1995 Ver Steeg worked as the Harvard Crimson's passing game coordinator, quarterbacks coach, wide receivers coach, and recruiting coordinator.

=== Chicago Bears ===
In 1996 Ver Steeg got his first taste coaching at the NFL level as he worked for the Chicago Bears, as an offensive assistant and quality control coach.

=== Illinois ===
From 1997 to 2000, Ver Steeg worked as the quarterbacks coach and recruiting coordinator for the Illini.

=== Utah (second stint) ===
In 2001 Ver Steeg was finally given control over an offense, being made the Utes offensive coordinator and quarterbacks coach a position he held until the end of the 2002 season.

=== Rutgers ===
In 2003 Ver Steeg joined Greg Schiano’s staff at Rutgers as the offensive coordinator and quarterbacks coach a position he was in until 2005. In 2006 he was made the team’s co-offensive coordinator and running backs coach. In 2007 he had the role of running backs coach coaching All-American Ray Rice.

=== Baltimore Ravens ===
In 2008 Ver Steeg returned to the NFL, joining John Harbaugh’s Ravens staff as an offensive assistant. He previously coached with Harbaugh in Cincinnati. In 2011 he added the additional title of quarterbacks coach. In 2012 it was announced that he would be working as the team’s senior offensive assistant. Ver Steeg won his first Super Bowl title when the Ravens defeated the San Francisco 49ers in Super Bowl XLVII. In 2019 he added to the senior offensive role as it was announced he would also be working with running backs. In 2021, Ver Steeg was named the Ravens’ running backs coach. He was let go from Ravens after the 2022 season.
