= Mike Teel =

American football player and coach (born 1986)

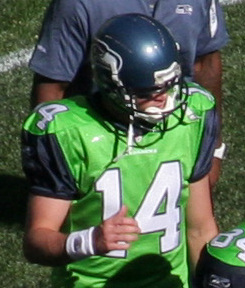
- Teel with the Seattle Seahawks in 2009

No. 14
- Position: Quarterback

Personal information
- Born: January 6, 1986 (age 40); Oakland, New Jersey, U.S.
- Listed height: 6 ft 3 in (1.91 m)
- Listed weight: 230 lb (104 kg)

Career information
- High school: Don Bosco Prep (Ramsey, New Jersey)
- College: Rutgers
- NFL draft: 2009: 6th round, 178th overall pick

Career history

Playing
- Seattle Seahawks (2009); New England Patriots (2010)*; Chicago Bears (2010)*; Las Vegas Locomotives (2011)*
- * Offseason or practice squad member only

Coaching
- Kean (2011) Quarterbacks coach; Wagner (2012–2013) Quarterbacks coach; Rutgers (2014) Graduate assistant; Don Bosco Prep (NJ) (2015–2016) Offensive coordinator; Don Bosco Prep (NJ) (2017–2018) Head coach
- Stats at Pro Football Reference

Mike Teel (born January 6, 1986) is an American former professional football quarterback. He played college football for the Rutgers Scarlet Knights, and was selected by the Seattle Seahawks in the sixth round of the 2009 NFL draft. Teel spent time with the Seahawks, New England Patriots, and Chicago Bears in the span of three years. After serving as the quarterbacks coach for the Kean Cougars of Kean University in 2011, he was the quarterbacks coach for Wagner College in 2012 and departed after one year. In 2014, Teel resumed coaching as a graduate assistant at Rutgers. Teel is formerly the head coach for the Don Bosco Prep Ironmen football team.

== Early life ==
Teel grew up in Oakland, New Jersey and attended Don Bosco Preparatory High School in Ramsey, New Jersey, where he was an all-state selection his junior and senior seasons (2002) (2003), and led Don Bosco to a state championship in the parochial division and a 23–0 record as a starter.

He was only rated a two-star recruit by Rivals.com and was offered scholarships by Rutgers, Penn State, Virginia, Michigan State and Wisconsin.

== College career ==
Following high school, Teel attended Rutgers University, where he redshirted as a freshman in 2004. As a freshman in 2005, Teel saw action in eight games, completing 51 of 101 passes for 683 yards and two touchdowns. In 2006, along with Brian Leonard, Tiquan Underwood, Eric Foster, Kenny Britt, and Ray Rice, Teel led Rutgers to a 9–0 start and one of the biggest wins in school history with a victory over Louisville, then ranked #3 nationally by the Coaches' Poll. The Scarlet Knights finished with an 11–2 record as Teel tallied 2,135 passing yards and 12 touchdowns on the season.

In 2007, as a junior, Teel started 13 games, passing for 3,147 yards and 20 touchdowns. He attempted a career-high 52 passes against Connecticut on November 3, finishing the game with 343 passing yards.

Teel struggled at the outset of the 2008 campaign by throwing seven interceptions over his first six games as the Scarlet Knights stumbled to a 1–5 record, but the fifth-year senior rallied and led Rutgers to six straight wins to close out the season along with a fourth straight berth in a college bowl game. On October 25, 2008, Teel threw six touchdown passes for 362 yards against #17 Pittsburgh, a school record. He was chosen as National Player of the Week for the first time in his career. On December 4, 2008, Teel had a career night in the final home game of his college career, completing 21 of 26 passes for 447 yards and seven touchdowns with no interceptions as Rutgers routed Louisville 63–14. The yardage and touchdown totals were single game school records as the Scarlet Knights finished their schedule at 7–5.

In the last game of his collegiate career in the 2008 PapaJohns.com Bowl against NC State, Teel helped Rutgers rally from a 17–6 deficit by throwing for 319 yards and two touchdowns.

On January 25, 2009, Teel was honored as Big East Conference Player of the Year by the New Jersey Sports Writers Association.

=== College statistics ===
Year	CMP	ATT	YDS	CMP%	YPA	LNG	TD	INT	SACK	RAT
2005	51	101	683	50.5	6.76	38	2	10	6	94.03
2006	164	296	2135	55.4	7.21	72	12	13	7	120.59
2007	203	349	3147	58.2	9.02	69	20	13	7	145.37
2008	243	396	3418	61.6	8.63	93	25	13	16	148.13

== Professional career ==
Pre-draft measurables
Height	Weight	40-yard dash	10-yard split	20-yard split	20-yard shuttle	Three-cone drill	Vertical jump	Broad jump
6 ft 3 in (1.91 m)	225 lb (102 kg)	5.13 s	1.78 s	2.89 s	4.59 s	7.65 s	28.5 in (0.72 m)	8 ft 8 in (2.64 m)
All values from Pro Day

=== Seattle Seahawks ===
Teel was selected by the Seattle Seahawks in the sixth round (178th overall) of the 2009 NFL draft. During the 2009 preseason, Teel completed 20 of 41 passes (48.8%) for 238 yards and 3 touchdowns. He was listed as Seattle's third quarterback for all 16 games, but did not play at all during the 2009 regular season. After the Seahawks and new head coach Pete Carroll signed J. P. Losman, Teel was waived on May 19, 2010.

=== New England Patriots ===
On May 21, 2010, Teel was claimed off waivers by the New England Patriots. He was waived on June 11, 2010.

=== Chicago Bears ===
Teel signed with the Chicago Bears on July 20, 2010. He was injured in August and placed on injured reserve. Teel was later released.

== Coaching career ==
Kean University hired Teel as their quarterbacks coach in 2011.

On February 6, 2012, Mike Teel was hired as quarterbacks coach at Wagner College. He left Wagner after one year.

Teel returned to Kean in 2013 as quarterbacks coach.

Teel served the Rutgers Scarlet Knights as a graduate assistant in the 2014–2015 season.

He was the head football coach at New Jersey powerhouse, Don Bosco Prep, of which he is an alum. He stepped down on Jan. 25, 2019.
