= Terrell Willis =

American football player

Profile
- Position: Running back

Personal information
- Born: c. 1975; Orange, New Jersey, U.S.

Career information
- High school: Orange (NJ)
- College: Rutgers (1993–1995)

Terrell Willis (born c. 1975) is a former American football running back. He played college football for the Rutgers Scarlet Knights from 1993 to 1995.

As a redshirt freshman in 1993, Willis ranked ninth among major-college players with 1,261 rushing yards, an average of 6.5 yards per carry and 114.6 yards per game. He was also the first frehman in history to gain in excess of 2,000 all-purpose yards, breaking an NCAA record set by Herschel Walker. He won first-team All-Big East honors and was selected as the UPI Freshman of the Year at the end of the 1993 season.

Willis surpassed the 1,000-yard mark again in 1994 with 1,080 rushing yards. Over his three years at Rutgers, he tallied 3,114 rushing yards, 2,063 yards on kickoff returns, 163 receiving yards, and 21 touchdowns.

Willis's performance declined as a junior in 1995, as he tallied 773 rushing yards and his yards per carry dipped to 4.4. One New Jersey sports writer questioned whether Willis he "lost his desire to play the game or had it destroyed by too many losses." His scholarship was revoked after the 1995 season. He declared for the NFL draft but went undrafted. He tried out with the New York Jets but did not make the team.

Willis was inducted into the Rutgers Football Hall of Fame in 2005.

== See also ==
- Rutgers Scarlet Knights football statistical leaders
