= Jim Dumont =

American football player (born 1968)

No. 53, 56
- Position: Linebacker

Personal information
- Born: July 16, 1961 (age 65); Bristol, Connecticut, U.S.
- Listed height: 6 ft 1 in (1.85 m)
- Listed weight: 224 lb (102 kg)

Career information
- High school: Neshaminy (Langhorne, Pennsylvania)
- College: Rutgers
- NFL draft: 1984: 7th round, 190th overall pick

Career history
- Cleveland Browns (1984); New Jersey Generals (1985)

Awards and highlights
- Third-team All-American (1983); 2× First-team All-East (1982, 1983)
- Stats at Pro Football Reference

James J. Dumont (born July 16, 1961) is an American former professional football linebacker who played for the Cleveland Browns of the National Football League (NFL). He played college football for the Rutgers Scarlet Knights and was selected by the Browns in the seventh round of the 1984 NFL draft.

== Early life ==
James J. Dumont was born on July 16, 1961, in Bristol, Pennsylvania.He attended Neshaminy High School in Langhorne, Pennsylvania.

== College career ==
Dumont enrolled at Rutgers University to play college football for the Scarlet Knights. He was a four-year letterman in 1979, 1981, 1982, and 1983. He did not earn a letter in 1980 after suffering a season-ending broken jaw against Cincinnati on September 20, 1980. He earned Associated Press (AP) first-team All-East honors in 1982 and 1983. In 1983, Dumont set the school's single-season tackles record with 154, garnering AP third-team All-American recognition. He was a Rutgers co-captain in 1983. Dumont set a school record with 448 career tackles. He was inducted into the Rutgers Athletics Hall of Fame in 1990.

== Professional career ==
Dumont was selected by the Browns in the seventh round, with the 190th overall pick, of the 1984 NFL draft. He signed with the team on July 11. He played in 12 games during the 1984 season as a reserve linebacker. Dumont was released on November 22, 1984.

Dumont signed with the New Jersey Generals for the 1985 USFL season. The Generals had previously selected Dumont in the 1984 USFL draft. He played in games for the Generals in 1985, and also spent some time on the practice roster. The USFL folded after the 1985 season.

== Personal life ==
Dumont played with his twin brother, Bob Dumont, while at Rutgers.
