= Mark Harrison (American football) =

American gridiron football player (born 1990)

Profile
- Position: Wide receiver

Personal information
- Born: December 11, 1990 (age 35); Stratford, Connecticut, U.S.
- Listed height: 6 ft 3 in (1.91 m)
- Listed weight: 235 lb (107 kg)

Career information
- High school: Frank Scott Bunnell (Stratford, Connecticut)
- College: Rutgers
- NFL draft: 2013: undrafted

Career history
- New England Patriots (2013); Kansas City Chiefs (2014)*; Toronto Argonauts (2014)
- * Offseason or practice squad member only
- Stats at Pro Football Reference

Mark Harrison (born December 11, 1990) is an American former professional football wide receiver. He previously played college football for Rutgers. Harrison also has played for the Chicago Bears and New England Patriots.

Harrison graduated from Bunnell High School in Connecticut.

== College career ==
As a true freshman in 2009, Harrison appeared in eight games, making one start and finishing the season with five catches for 83 yards (16.6 yards per reception) and one touchdown. In 2010, Harrison started eleven of twelve games, catching 44 passes for 829 yards (18.8) and nine touchdowns. He started just five of twelve games as a junior in 2011; on the season, he caught just fourteen passes for 274 yards (19.6) and two touchdowns. However, he rebounded in his senior year, catching 44 passes for 583 yards (13.3) and six touchdowns.

== Professional career ==
Harrison was considered a potential late-round prospect for the 2013 NFL Draft and was invited to the combine. After the combine, the hotel room Harrison shared with Clemson WR DeAndre Hopkins was found to be left in a state where "urine and feces were found around the bathroom, toothpaste was left on the mirror and partially eaten food was on one of the beds," per ESPN, who also reported that NFL sources did not believe Harrison was responsible for what happened to the room. Both players denied responsibility.

Pre-draft measurables
Height	Weight	Arm length	Hand span	Wingspan	40-yard dash	10-yard split	20-yard split	20-yard shuttle	Three-cone drill	Vertical jump	Broad jump	Bench press
6 ft 2 7/8 in (1.90 m)	231 lb (105 kg)	35 in (0.89 m)	9 5/8 in (0.24 m)	6 ft 9 1/2 in (2.07 m)	4.46 s	1.59 s	2.65 s	4.33 s	6.99 s	38.5 in (0.98 m)	10 ft 9 in (3.28 m)	17 reps
All values from 2013 NFL Combine

On May 20, 2013, he was signed by the New England Patriots as an undrafted free agent. On August 26, 2013, he was placed on the reserve/non-football injury list. He was released by the Patriots on June 4, 2014 after being late to OTAs.

Harrison was signed by the Chiefs in 2014. He was released on August 30, 2014.

On October 15, 2014, Harrison signed a practice roster agreement with the Toronto Argonauts of the Canadian Football League. He was activated on November 6, 2014. Harrison was released by the Argonauts on May 22, 2015.
