= James Guarantano =

American gridiron football player

Profile
- Position: Wide receiver

Personal information
- Born: Lodi, New Jersey, U.S.

Career information
- College: Rutgers

Career history
- 1993: San Diego Chargers
- 1994–1997: Baltimore Stallions

Awards and highlights
- Grey Cup champion (1995); First-team All-Big East (1992); Second-team All-East (1991)

James Guarantano is an American former professional football player who was a wide receiver for the NFL's San Diego Chargers and the CFL's Baltimore Stallions. He was also a former standout wide receiver while playing college football for the Rutgers Scarlet Knights.

Raised in Lodi, New Jersey, Guarantano played prep football at Lodi High School.

== College career ==
Guarantano played at Rutgers University from 1989 to 1992.

In the 1991 season, Guarantano collected 740 yards, on 62 receptions, which was tops in the Big East. That was highlighted by a game against Temple on November 17, 1991, when Rutgers clinched its first winning season in four years. Guarantano caught a 70-yard touchdown pass, allowing the Scarlet Knights to finish with a 6–5 record, their first winning season since going 6–5 in 1987. Following the season, he was named to the All Big East Second-team.

Guarantano would follow that up in 1992 with 56 receptions for 755 yards (13.5 yards per catch) and six touchdowns. One of those touchdowns came in a dramatic victory over Pittsburgh on September 18, 1992. Guarantano caught a 33-yard score to send Rutgers to a 7–0 halftime lead, and Rutgers would go on to win 21–16. For his efforts, Guarantano was named to the All Big East First-team, and was a UPI Honorable Mention All American.

=== College legacy ===
When Guarantano graduated in 1992, he left as one of the most prolific receivers in school history. Guarantano was second All-Time in Scarlet Knight history in yards (2,065), first in receptions (158) and third in touchdowns (11). In 1999, he was inducted into the Rutgers football Hall of Fame.

== Professional career ==
Guarantano discussed a possible contract with the New York Giants before he signed as an undrafted free agent with the San Diego Chargers on April 30, 1993. He was released on May 5, 1993. Following his stint in the NFL, Guarantano would play for the Baltimore Stallions (now the Montreal Alouettes) of the CFL from 1994 to 1997.

== Personal ==
Following his professional football career, Guarantano became a police officer in the NYPD. Guarantano's son, Jarrett Guarantano, was one of the top quarterbacks in New Jersey's 2016 high school class, and is a former starting QB at the University of Tennessee before transferring to Washington State. He chose the Vols over Rutgers University, his dad's alma mater, and Ohio State University.
