= Bryan Fortay =

American football player (born 1971)

Profile
- Position: Quarterback

Personal information
- Born: November 2, 1971 (age 55)
- Listed height: 6 ft 2 in (1.88 m)
- Listed weight: 200 lb (91 kg)

Career information
- High school: East Brunswick (NJ)
- College: Rutgers

Career history
- Frankfurt Galaxy (1995); Miami Hooters (1995)

Awards and highlights
- World Bowl champion (1995); National champion (1989)

Career AFL statistics
- Comp. / Att.: 97 / 170
- Passing yards: 1,190
- TD–INT: 17–9
- QB rating: 81.74
- Rushing TDs: 3
- Stats at ArenaFan.com

Bryan Fortay (born November 2, 1971) is an American former football quarterback. He played college football for the Miami Hurricanes and Rutgers Scarlet Knights, and professionally for the Frankfurt Galaxy of the World League of American Football (WLAF), and the Miami Hooters of the Arena Football League (AFL).

== Early life ==
A 1989 graduate of East Brunswick High School in East Brunswick, New Jersey, Fortay was among the most sought after quarterbacks in the country his high school senior year. He was selected as a Junior Heisman award winner by the Downtown Athletic Club of New York and was the Bobby Dodd High School Back of the Year, as chosen by the Touchdown Club of Atlanta. He was named 1st team high school All-American by ESPN, Parade Magazine, Super Prep Magazine, Coca-Cola and the National High School Coaches Association. As a high school senior he once returned an interception 79 yards for a touchdown and was a First Team All State punter, averaging 42.1 yards per punt. As a high school point guard in basketball, Fortay scored over 1,000 points while dishing out almost 400 assists and leading his high school basketball team to a 25–3 record and the Middlesex County Championship in 1987.

== College career ==
He was one of the first true freshmen to earn a varsity letter at quarterback for the University of Miami and a member of the 1989 National Championship team. After transferring from Miami to Rutgers, he threw for 2,374 yards and 25 touchdown passes for the Rutgers Scarlet Knights, breaking the Rutgers record for touchdown passes in a season and leading the Scarlet Knights to a 7–4 record his junior year.

== Professional career ==
He also was a member of the Frankfurt Galaxy of the WLAF and a member of the team that won the WLAF championship in 1995. He played for the AFL's Miami Hooters in 1995, recording 17 passing touchdowns on 1,190 yards.
