= Cabrini High School (Michigan) =

Private Catholic school in Allen Park, Michigan, United States

Saint Frances Cabrini Catholic High School and Academy

Location
- 15305 Wick Road; Allen Park, Michigan 48101; United States; 42°14′32″N 83°12′36″W

Information
- Type: Private coeducational
- Religious affiliation: Roman Catholic
- Established: 1960
- Head of school
- Grades: 7–12
- Colors: Navy blue and gold
- Athletics conference: Catholic High School League
- Nickname: Monarchs
- Website: www.cabrinihighschool.org

Saint Frances Cabrini High School and Academy is a Catholic high school and academy located in Allen Park, Michigan. Located in the Roman Catholic Archdiocese of Detroit, it has been in operation since 1960. The school colors are navy blue and gold, and they are known as the Monarchs.

Notable graduates of Cabrini High School include silver medal Olympic athlete Amanda Chidester design award-winning, custom jeweler, Amber Ann Hall (Gustafson) (1979), a member of the prestigious American Gem Society, residing in Texas. In 2009–2010, the Michigan Association of Secondary School Principals assistant principal of the year recipient was Sinder Gundick, a 1983 graduate of Cabrini High School.

== Athletics ==
The Cabrini women's softball team from 2007 holds the national record for allowing the fewest runs in a season (1). The team also made headlines for a 35–0 season to follow up their 2006 season, where the team went 39–0, taking home back-to-back State titles during those two seasons.

Notable graduates in terms of athletics include Amanda Chidester, University of Michigan softball, Christopher Russelburg, Detroit Mercy track and field runner, Ava Teed, Central Michigan Cross Country and Track runner, and Alana Maffesoli, University of Michigan Rowing.
