= Ray Lucas =

American football player (born 1972)

No. 15, 18, 6
- Position: Quarterback

Personal information
- Born: August 6, 1972 (age 54); Harrison, New Jersey, U.S.
- Listed height: 6 ft 2 in (1.88 m)
- Listed weight: 215 lb (98 kg)

Career information
- High school: Harrison
- College: Rutgers
- NFL draft: 1996: undrafted

Career history
- New England Patriots (1996); New York Jets (1997–2000); Miami Dolphins (2001–2002); Baltimore Ravens (2003)

Career NFL statistics
- Passing attempts: 483
- Passing completions: 280
- Completion percentage: 58.0%
- TD–INT: 18–17
- Passing yards: 3,029
- Passer rating: 74.3
- Rushing yards: 396
- Rushing touchdowns: 4
- Stats at Pro Football Reference

Raymond J. Lucas (born August 6, 1972) is an American former professional football player who was a quarterback in the National Football League (NFL). He played college football for the Rutgers Scarlet Knights. He played in the NFL for the New England Patriots, New York Jets and the Miami Dolphins during his seven-year career from 1996 to 2002. He is currently a studio analyst for the show Jets Nation on New York City-based sports network SportsNet New York.

== Early life ==
Lucas was born while his father, Tom, was serving in Vietnam. He played prep football at Harrison High School.

== Professional career ==
Pre-draft measurables
| Height | Weight | Arm length | Hand span | 40-yard dash | 10-yard split | 20-yard split | 20-yard shuttle | Vertical jump |
|---|---|---|---|---|---|---|---|---|
| 6 ft 2 1/4 in (1.89 m) | 202 lb (92 kg) | 31 1/2 in (0.80 m) | 9 1/2 in (0.24 m) | 4.71 s | 1.64 s | 2.77 s | 4.34 s | 33.0 in (0.84 m) |

=== Early career ===
Lucas spent most of his career in the NFL in a backup role. During the 1999 NFL season, after quarterback Vinny Testaverde was injured in the first game of the season, Rick Mirer took the helm, winning four of ten games. Lucas took over afterward and lost his first two starts but won his next four games to give the Jets an 8-8 record for the season.

Lucas was a favorite player of Bill Parcells during Parcells' time in New England and with the Jets, and was one of the players Parcells eventually brought over from the Patriots to the Jets. Parcells introduced Lucas in 1997 by putting him in at quarterback with second string QB Neil O'Donnell lined up at wide receiver. Lucas set up in a shotgun formation and ran the ball himself for 15 yards, befuddling the Vikings defense in a play that eventually led to a Jets victory. He attempted his first NFL pass in Week 17 of 1997 against the Detroit Lions. Lucas went 3 of 3 for 28 yards before throwing an interception. He was also called for a personal foul when making the tackle on the interception return. Lucas started in the Jets' 1999 preseason opener against the Green Bay Packers, and Parcells had him in the running for the starting and second-string quarterback role during that season. After starting QB Vinny Testaverde was injured in the first game of the season, Lucas started several games.

=== Later career ===
Following his success with the Jets, Lucas spent the 2001 and 2002 seasons with the Miami Dolphins. As the team's backup quarterback, he didn't see much playing time during the 2001 season (only having three pass attempts), but during the 2002 season Lucas got an opportunity to start six games. Due to his large size, he was also the quarterback of choice during goal-line and some red zone situations. The Dolphins began the 2002 season 5-1, but after then starting quarterback Jay Fiedler broke his thumb during a Monday night game against Denver, Lucas was trusted to quarterback the Dolphins for the next six games. During those games, Lucas amassed 4 touchdowns, 6 interceptions, and a 69.9 QB rating.

Lucas holds the unenviable distinction of worst single game quarterback performance by any Dolphin. On October 20, 2002, in one game against the Buffalo Bills, Lucas was responsible for 6 turnovers: 4 interceptions and 2 fumbles. He completed only 13 passes to Dolphin receivers. The player that caught the most passes from Lucas was Buffalo Cornerback Nate Clements.

=== Post-career ===
On March 28, 2008, Lucas was named to the Hudson County Sports Hall of Fame.

In 2014, Lucas co-wrote the book Under Pressure: How Playing Football Almost Cost Me Everything and Why I'd Do It All Again.

In March 2018, Lucas was named Executive Director of the Housing Authority in his hometown of Harrison, New Jersey, serving in the same capacity that his father did for 27 years.

== Broadcasting career ==
For several years, Lucas worked for SportsNet New York as an analyst to Jets programs such as pre-game and post-game shows and weekly updates, before leaving in 2020.

In 2009 Lucas joined the Rutgers Football Radio Network as a color analyst, a role he no longer has as of 2021 as he decided to coach his home high school football team.
