= Eric Hochberg (American football) =

American football player

Eric Hochberg was an American football player for the Rutgers University Scarlet Knights. He was the team's starting quarterback in 1984 and set school records for single-game and career passing yards.

== College ==
Hochberg is from State College, Pennsylvania, and his father, Jim, was a sports medicine coordinator at Pennsylvania State University. During his first two years at Rutgers – 1982 and 1983 – Eric was a back-up to starting quarterback Jacque LaPrarie. On October 1, 1983, Hochberg played against Penn State and set the Rutgers single-game record for passing yards, with 367; the record was broken five years later. Hochberg finished the 1983 season with 61 completions in 100 pass attempts, 841 yards, and four touchdowns.

As a junior, Hochberg was the primary quarterback for the 1984 Rutgers Scarlet Knights football team. He led the team to a win over 18th-ranked West Virginia on November 10, throwing for 163 yards and one touchdown. For the season, he completed 162 of 305 passes for 1,905 yards and nine touchdowns. He led the team in both passing yards and total offense yards (1,818) and was named "Most Courageous Athlete of the Year" by New Jersey sportswriters. Rutgers had a record of 7–3.

In 1985, Hochberg lost some playing time to fellow quarterback Joe Gagliardi, who led the team in passing yards that year. Rutgers finished 2–8–1, and Hochberg was 79 for 169 passing with 752 yards and four touchdowns. He ended his Rutgers career with 337 completions in 639 attempts and 3,825 total passing yards. The passing yards mark was a Scarlet Knights record until it was broken Scott Erney in 1988.
