= Jeremy Ito =

American gridiron football player (born 1986)

- Jeremy Ito with Rutgers in 2008

No. 1
- Positions: Placekicker, punter

Personal information
- Born: March 4, 1986 (age 40); Loma Linda, California
- Listed height: 5 ft 11 in (1.80 m)
- Listed weight: 175 lb (79 kg)

Career information
- College: Rutgers
- NFL draft: 2008: undrafted

Career history
- New Orleans Saints (2008)*; Hamilton Tiger-Cats (2009)
- * Offseason or practice squad member only

Jeremy Ito (born March 4, 1986) is a former placekicker and punter for the Rutgers Scarlet Knights NCAA Division I-A football team. He also played for the Hamilton Tiger-Cats of the Canadian Football League. Ito is half Japanese. During his career at Rutgers, he was given the nickname "The Judge" - after Lance Ito, by fans for his clutch, game kicking performances.

== High school ==
Ito attended Redlands High School in Redlands, California and was a student and a letterman in football, soccer, and golf. In football, he was a three-time All-Citrus Belt League selection.

== College career ==
Ito had a career field goals made percentage of 72.1, connecting on 80 of 111 attempts for the Scarlet Knights. A career highlight is a 28-yard game-winning field goal against the Louisville Cardinals in an upset victory on November 9, 2006, by a score of 28–25. The victory elevated Rutgers to # 7 in the country, their highest ranking ever. Ito was not drafted in the 2008 NFL draft.

== Professional career ==
In 2008, Ito was signed by the Saints, but was released at the beginning of the season.

On October 10, 2009, Ito was added to the practice roster of the Hamilton Tiger-Cats in the Canadian Football League. On November 8, 2009, he made his regular-season debut, kicking three field goals in Hamilton's victory over Winnipeg. On May 12, 2010, Ito was released by the Tiger-Cats.
