= Gary Nova =

American football player (born 1993)

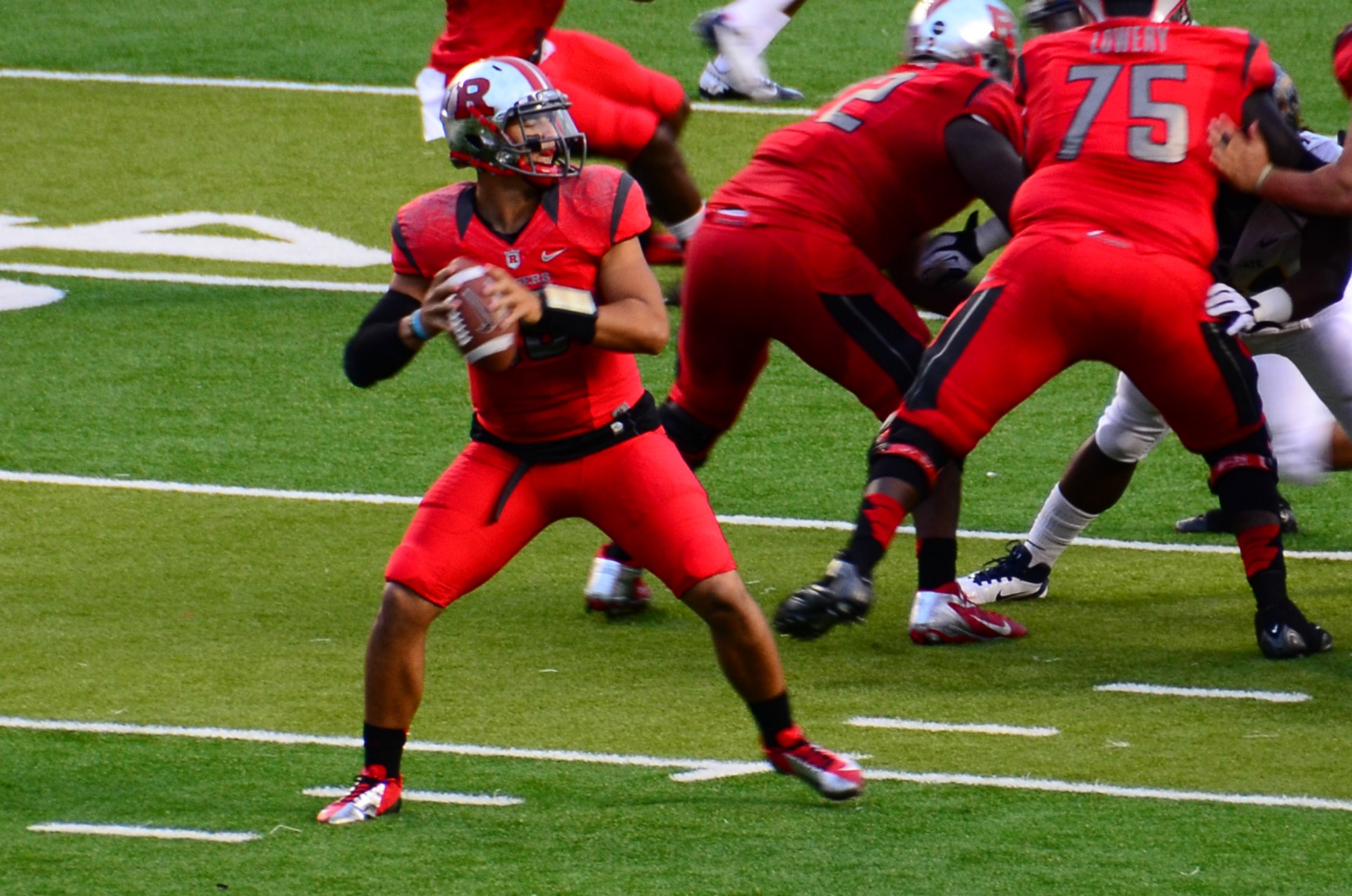
- Nova with Rutgers in 2012

No. 10
- Position: Quarterback

Personal information
- Born: April 27, 1993 (age 33); Elmwood Park, New Jersey, U.S.
- Listed height: 6 ft 1 in (1.85 m)
- Listed weight: 222 lb (101 kg)

Career information
- High school: Don Bosco Prep (Ramsey, New Jersey)
- College: Rutgers (2011–2014)
- NFL draft: 2015: undrafted
- Stats at Pro Football Reference

Gary Nova (born April 27, 1993) is an American football quarterback. He played college football at Rutgers and was the Scarlet Knights starting quarterback from 2012 to 2014.

== Early life ==
Nova attended Don Bosco Prep High School in Ramsey, New Jersey.

== College career ==
Nova started five games in 2011, his first being against Navy as a true freshman and led Rutgers to a victory in the 2011 Pinstripe Bowl over Iowa State 27–13, despite throwing for just 20 yards.

In 2012, Nova was named the starting quarterback and led Rutgers to its best start since 2006, starting 7–0. When Rutgers was ranked (#15 in Coaches polls and #18 in the AP Poll), Nova did throw six interceptions in a loss to 6–1 Kent State 35–23, however.

The 2013 season proved rather unsuccessful for Nova, as he threw for 14 interceptions in 10 games, and had a 54.2 completion percentage. Among those games was a four interception game in a 24–10 loss at Louisville, and a three interception game in a 49–14 loss vs Houston. As a result, he was replaced by Chas Dodd in the final two games as the starting quarterback.

Rutgers moved to the Big Ten Conference for the 2014 season. Nova regained the starting job for the 2014 season. In Rutgers' Big Ten debut against Penn State, Nova would throw no touchdowns and five interceptions in a 13–10 home loss. On September 27, 2014 Nova set the Rutgers record for career touchdown passes. In his final game in the 2014 Quick Lane Bowl against North Carolina, he completed 9-of-20 passes and threw for 184 yards with 2 touchdowns. He was named team MVP at the 2014 awards banquet. It was the most successful statistical season for Nova, as he threw for a career high 2,851 yards, 57.2 completion percentage, 3 rushing touchdowns, 22 passing touchdowns, and an 8.7 yards per attempt.

=== Statistics ===
Nova's career statistics are as follows:

Year	Team	Passing							Rushing			
Year	Team	Comp	Att	Yards	Pct.	TD	Int	QB rating	Att	Yards	Avg	TD
2011	Rutgers	116	227	1,553	51.1	11	9	116.6	23	−114	−5.0	0
2012	Rutgers	221	388	2,695	57.0	22	16	125.8	22	−44	−2.0	0
2013	Rutgers	165	303	2,159	54.5	18	14	124.7	50	−93	−1.9	1
2014	Rutgers	187	327	2,851	57.2	22	12	145.3	45	−25	−0.6	3
Totals		689	1,245	9,258	55.3	73	51	129.0	140	-256	-1.8	4

== Professional career ==
Pre-draft measurables
Height	Weight	Arm length	Hand span	40-yard dash	10-yard split	20-yard split	20-yard shuttle	Three-cone drill	Vertical jump	Broad jump
6 ft 1 3/8 in (1.86 m)	222 lb (101 kg)	30 1/2 in (0.77 m)	8 3/4 in (0.22 m)	4.73 s	1.59 s	2.73 s	4.46 s	7.03 s	34.0 in (0.86 m)	9 ft 7 in (2.92 m)
All values from Pro Day

After going undrafted in the 2015 NFL draft, Nova attended rookie minicamp on a tryout basis with the New York Giants in May 2015.
