= Tiquan Underwood =

American football player and coach (born 1987)

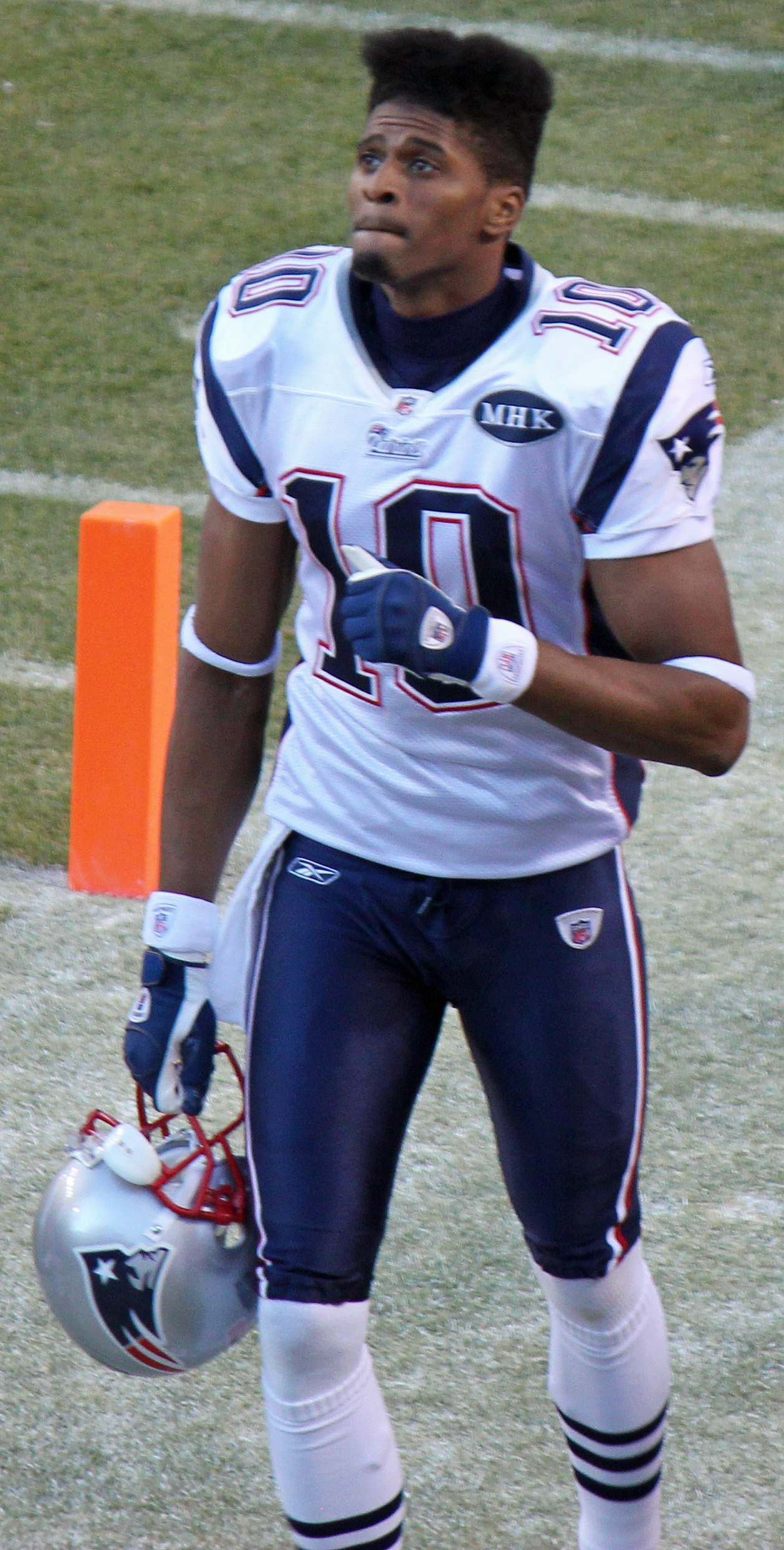
- Underwood with the New England Patriots in 2011

Houston Texans
- Title: Assistant wide receivers coach

Personal information
- Born: February 17, 1987 (age 39); New Brunswick, New Jersey, U.S.
- Listed height: 6 ft 1 in (1.85 m)
- Listed weight: 183 lb (83 kg)

Career information
- Position: Wide receiver (No. 19, 10, 11)
- High school: Notre Dame (Lawrenceville, New Jersey)
- College: Rutgers (2005–2008)
- NFL draft: 2009: 7th round, 253rd overall pick

Career history

Playing
- Jacksonville Jaguars (2009–2010); New England Patriots (2011); Tampa Bay Buccaneers (2012–2013); Carolina Panthers (2014)*; Hamilton Tiger-Cats (2015–2016); Montreal Alouettes (2016–2017)
- * Offseason or practice squad member only

Coaching
- Lafayette (2018) Wide receivers coach; Miami Dolphins (2019) Offensive quality control coach; Rutgers (2020–2021) Wide receivers coach; Pittsburgh (2022–2023) Wide receivers coach & passing game coordinator; New England Patriots (2024) Assistant wide receivers coach; Dallas Cowboys (2025) Assistant wide receivers coach; Houston Texans (2026–present) Assistant wide receivers coach

Career NFL statistics
- Receptions: 63
- Receiving yards: 1,006
- Receiving touchdowns: 6
- Stats at Pro Football Reference
- Stats at CFL.ca

Tiquan Underwood (born February 17, 1987) is an American football coach and former wide receiver who is the assistant wide receivers coach for the Houston Texans of the National Football League (NFL). He played college football at Rutgers and was selected by the Jacksonville Jaguars in the seventh round of the 2009 NFL draft.

Underwood was also a member of the New England Patriots, Tampa Bay Buccaneers, and Carolina Panthers in the NFL. He also played for the Hamilton Tiger Cats and Montreal Alouettes of the Canadian Football League (CFL). Underwood is known for his distinctive hi-top fade hairstyle.

== Early life ==
Underwood grew up in North Brunswick, New Jersey. He played for Notre Dame High School in Lawrenceville, New Jersey. Underwood started as a wide receiver his sophomore and senior years. He was rated as a two-star recruit by Rivals.com and only received scholarship offers from Rutgers, Vanderbilt, and Maryland.

== College career ==
During the opening week of the 2007 college football season for Rutgers, Underwood was one of four nominees for the AT&T All-America Player of the Week award.

In 2008, Underwood was named a team captain. After the season, he was the recipient of the Loyal Knight Award, honoring the Rutgers player whose character and dedication have proved resilient in his pursuit of excellence.

== Professional career ==
Pre-draft measurables
Height	Weight	Arm length	Hand span	40-yard dash	10-yard split	20-yard split	20-yard shuttle	Three-cone drill	Vertical jump	Broad jump	Bench press
6 ft 1 1/8 in (1.86 m)	184 lb (83 kg)	32 1/4 in (0.82 m)	8 1/2 in (0.22 m)	4.36 s	1.48 s	2.58 s	4.11 s	6.62 s	41.5 in (1.05 m)	10 ft 9 in (3.28 m)	7 reps
All values from NFL Combine

=== Jacksonville Jaguars ===
Underwood was drafted 253rd overall in the seventh round of the 2009 NFL draft by the Jacksonville Jaguars. He was waived on September 5, 2009. He was re-signed to the practice squad on September 6. He was called up from the Jaguars practice squad on September 23, 2009. He was waived on August 25, 2011, after playing in 10 games in 2010.

=== New England Patriots ===
On August 29, 2011, Underwood signed with the New England Patriots. On September 3, five days after signing with Patriots, Underwood was cut. On November 8, 2011, Underwood was signed to the 53 man roster to boost a beleaguered kick return squad. He was released on November 12 and re-signed on November 23, 2011. On February 4, 2012, the night before Super Bowl XLVI, he was released. He was re-signed to the Patriots two days after the Super Bowl on February 7, 2012. He was cut again on May 3 after the Patriots had signed Jabar Gaffney. On August 23, 2012, he received his own AFC Championship ring.

=== Tampa Bay Buccaneers ===
On May 7, 2012, Underwood signed with the Tampa Bay Buccaneers. He rejoined his former coach Greg Schiano. Underwood was released by the Buccaneers on August 31, 2012, even though many felt he had an impressive training camp. On September 20, 2012, Tiquan was signed again by the Buccaneers when they released wide receiver Preston Parker. On October 21, 2012, Underwood caught his first touchdown pass of his career in a losing effort to the New Orleans Saints. He was released again by the Buccaneers on September 1, 2013, but then re-signed on October 2, 2013.

=== Carolina Panthers ===
Underwood signed with the Carolina Panthers on March 21, 2014. He was released on August 24, 2014.

=== Hamilton Tiger-Cats ===
On April 2, 2015, Underwood signed with the Hamilton Tiger Cats of the Canadian Football League (CFL). Underwood played in 14 games in the 2015 season and then 3 in the 2016 season before being released partway through the season in August 2016. In total he caught 45 passes for 711 yards with 3 touchdowns.

=== Montreal Alouettes ===
Underwood was signed to the Montreal Alouettes' practice roster on September 28, 2016. In his first season in Montreal Underwood played in 3 games catching 8 passes for 107 yards with one touchdown. Underwood was resigned for the 2017 season. On July 19, Underwood caught 5 passes for 95 yards and a touchdown, giving him 1,000 yards receiving in both his CFL and NFL careers. He was released by the Alouettes on October 18, 2017.

== Coaching career ==
=== Lafayette ===
Shortly after retiring from playing professional football, Underwood was hired as the wide receivers coach for Lafayette for the 2018 season. This was under John Garrett who was his wide receivers coach in Tampa with the Buccaneers.

=== Miami Dolphins ===
In 2019, Underwood was hired by the Miami Dolphins as an offensive quality control coach.

=== Rutgers ===
In 2020 after a season in Miami, Underwood returned to Rutgers where he played his college football as the team's wide receivers coach under Greg Schiano, whom Underwood played for in college.

=== Pittsburgh ===
After two seasons at his alma mater, Underwood joined the staff at Pittsburgh in January 2022.

=== New England Patriots ===
In 2024, Underwood was hired by the New England Patriots as an assistant wide receivers coach under Jerod Mayo, who Underwood was teammates with in 2011.

=== Dallas Cowboys ===
On February 3, 2025, the Dallas Cowboys hired Underwood to serve as their assistant wide receivers coach.
