= List of After Words interviews first aired in 2006 =

After Words is an American television series on the C-SPAN2 network’s weekend programming schedule known as Book TV. The program is an hour-long talk show, each week featuring an interview with the author of a new nonfiction book. The program has no regular host. Instead, each author is paired with a guest host who is familiar with the author or the subject matter of their book.

| First air date (Links to video) | Interviewee(s) | Interviewer(s) | Book | Topic of interview / Comments |
|---|---|---|---|---|
| January 7, 2006 | Nicholas Basbanes | David Kipen | Every Book Its Reader: The Power of the Printed Word to Stir the World | |
| January 14, 2006 | James Yee | Rowan Scarborough | For God and Country: Faith and Patriotism Under Fire | |
| January 21, 2006 | Paul Bremer | Jim Hoagland | My Year in Iraq: The Struggle to Build a Future of Hope | |
| January 28, 2006 | Fred Barnes | Peter Beinart | Rebel in Chief: Inside the Bold and Controversial Presidency of George W. Bush | Presidency of George W. Bush |
| February 4, 2006 | Kate O'Beirne | Jodi Enda | Women Who Make the World Worse: And How Their Radical Feminist Assault Is Ruining Our Schools, Families, Military, and Sports | |
| February 11, 2006 | David Rieff | Wesley Clark | At the Point of a Gun: Democratic Dreams and Armed Intervention | |
| February 18, 2006 | James McManus | T.R. Reid | Physical: An American Checkup | |
| February 25, 2006 | Bruce Bartlett | James Pinkerton | Imposter: How George W. Bush Bankrupted America and Betrayed the Reagan Legacy | George W. Bush |
| March 4, 2006 | David Vise | Lamar Smith | The Google Story: Inside the Hottest Business, Media, and Technology Success of Our Time | Google, History of Google |
| March 11, 2006 | Torie Clarke | Pamela Hess | Lipstick on a Pig: Winning in the No-Spin Era by Someone Who Knows the Game | |
| March 18, 2006 | Harvey Mansfield | Naomi Wolf | Manliness | |
| March 25, 2006 | Kevin Phillips | Grover Norquist | American Theocracy: The Peril and Politics of Radical Religion, Oil and Borrowed Money in the 21st Century | |
| April 1, 2006 | Michael Mandelbaum | Jacqueline Grapin | The Case for Goliath: How America Acts as the World's Government in the 21st Century | |
| April 8, 2006 | Matthew Bogdanos | Angela M.H. Schuster | Thieves of Baghdad: One Marine's Passion for Ancient Civilizations and the Journey to Recover the World's Greatest Stolen Treasures | |
| April 15, 2006 | John Tayman | Ed Case | The Colony: The Harrowing True Story of the Exiles of Molokai | Kalaupapa, Hawaii |
| April 22, 2006 | Julia Sweig | Mark Falcoff | Friendly Fire: Losing Friends and Making Enemies in the Anti-American Century | |
| April 29, 2006 | Joe Klein | Walter Shapiro | Politics Lost: How American Democracy Was Trivialized by People Who Think You're Stupid | |
| May 6, 2006 | Juliet Eilperin | Richard Cohen | Fight Club Politics: How Partisanship Is Poisoning the U.S. House of Representatives | |
| May 13, 2006 | Madeleine Albright | Georgie Anne Geyer | The Mighty and the Almighty: Reflections on America, God, and World Affairs | |
| May 20, 2006 | John Kasich | Gene Sperling | Stand for Something: The Battle for America's Soul | |
| May 27, 2006 | Richard Brookhiser | John Splaine | What Would the Founders Do?: Our Questions, Their Answers | |
| June 3, 2006 | Alvin Toffler | Newt Gingrich | Revolutionary Wealth | |
| June 10, 2006 | Frank Schaeffer | Kristin Henderson | AWOL: The Unexcused Absence of America's Upper Classes from Military Service and How It Hurts Our Country | |
| June 17, 2006 | Andrew Kohut | Brooks Jackson | America Against the World: How We Are Different and Why We Are Disliked | |
| June 24, 2006 | Mark Smith | Nan Aron | Disrobed: The New Battle Plan to Break the Left's Stranglehold on the Courts | |
| July 1, 2006 | Gordon Wood | Richard Norton Smith | Revolutionary Characters: What Made the Founders Different | Founding Fathers of the United States |
| July 8, 2006 | Nick Bryant | Joe Leonard | The Bystander: John F. Kennedy and the Struggle for Black Equality | John F. Kennedy and civil rights |
| July 15, 2006 | Peter Beinart | Martin Sieff | The Good Fight: Why Liberals--and Only Liberals--Can Win the War on Terror and Make America Great Again | |
| July 22, 2006 | Simon Schama | Edna Medford | Rough Crossings: Britain, the Slaves and the American Revolution | |
| July 29, 2006 | Thomas Ricks | Jeffrey McCausland | Fiasco: The American Military Adventure in Iraq | Iraq War |
| August 5, 2006 | Tom Tancredo | Anne Mulkern | In Mortal Danger: The Battle for America's Border and Security | |
| August 12, 2006 | Juan Williams | Michael Eric Dyson | Enough: The Phony Leaders, Dead-End Movements, and Culture of Failure that Are Undermining Black America--and What We Can Do about It | |
| August 20, 2006 | Thomas Kean and Lee Hamilton | Marvin Kalb | Without Precedent: The Inside Story of the 9/11 Commission | 9/11 Commission |
| August 26, 2006 | Robert Block | James Lee Witt | Disaster: Hurricane Katrina and the Failure of Homeland Security | Criticism of the government response to Hurricane Katrina |
| September 2, 2006 | Rahm Emanuel | Michael Tackett | The Plan: Big Ideas for America | |
| September 9, 2006 | Lawrence Wright | James Zogby | The Looming Tower: Al-Qaeda and the Road to 9/11 | al-Qaeda |
| September 16, 2006 | Joe Mathews | Rachel Smolkin | The People's Machine: Arnold Schwarzenegger and the Rise of Blockbuster Democracy | Political career of Arnold Schwarzenegger |
| September 23, 2006 | Patrick Hynes | Richard Cizik | In Defense of the Religious Right: Why Conservative Christians Are the Lifeblood of the Republican Party and Why That Terrifies the Democrats | |
| September 30, 2012 | George Soros | Ted Halstead | The Age of Fallibility: Consequences of the War on Terror | |
| October 7, 2006 | Lawrence Otis Graham | Adam Clayton Powell III | The Senator and the Socialite: The True Story of America's First Black Dynasty | Blanche Bruce |
| October 14, 2006 | John Danforth | Charles C. Haynes | Faith and Politics: How the 'Moral Values' Debate Divides America and How to Move Forward Together | |
| October 21, 2006 | Peter Stone | Charles Lewis | Heist: Superlobbyist Jack Abramoff, His Republican Allies, and the Buying of Washington | Jack Abramoff, Jack Abramoff scandals |
| October 28, 2006 | Ray Takeyh | Robert Litwak | Hidden Iran: Paradox and Power in the Islamic Republic | Iran–United States relations |
| November 4, 2006 | Mark Updegrove | Mark Pachter | Second Acts: Presidential Lives and Legacies After the White House | |
| November 11, 2006 | Nicholas Lemann | Herman Belz | Redemption: The Last Battle of the Civil War | Reconstruction Era |
| November 18, 2006 | John O'Sullivan | Martin Walker | The President, the Pope, and the Prime Minister: Three Who Changed the World | Dissolution of the Soviet Union, Ronald Reagan, Pope John Paul II, Margaret Thatcher |
| November 25, 2006 | William Middendorf | David Frum | A Glorious Disaster: Barry Goldwater's Presidential Campaign and the Origins of the Conservative Movement | Barry Goldwater presidential campaign, 1964 |
| December 3, 2006 | Karen DeYoung | Charles "Casey" Brower | Soldier: The Life of Colin Powell | Colin Powell |
| December 9, 2006 | Larry Kahaner | Peter Singer | AK-47: The Weapon that Changed the Face of War | AK-47 |
| December 16, 2006 | Ali Abunimah | Ron Kampeas | One Country: A Bold Proposal to End the Israeli-Palestinian Impasse | Israeli–Palestinian conflict |
| December 23, 2006 | Alex Kershaw | Jack Pulwers | The Few: The American "Knights of the Air" Who Risked Everything to Fight in the Battle of Britain | Non-British personnel in the RAF during the Battle of Britain, Eagle Squadrons |
| December 30, 2006 | David Cannadine | Leslie Schweitzer | Mellon: An American Life | Andrew Mellon |
