= Don Bosco Preparatory High School =

Catholic high school in Ramsey, New Jersey, US

Location
- 492 North Franklin Turnpike; Ramsey, (Bergen County), New Jersey 07446; United States; 41.072038°N 74.135707°W

Information
- Type: Private
- Motto: Latin: Crescere Scientia et Gratia (To Increase in Knowledge and Grace)
- Religious affiliation: Catholic
- Established: 1915
- NCES School ID: 00863362
- President: Joseph R. Azzolino
- Director: Fr. Abraham Feliciano, SDB
- Principal: Jeffrey Wojcik
- Faculty: 119.1 FTEs
- Grades: 9–12
- Gender: Boys
- Enrollment: 786 (as of 2023–24)
- Student to teacher ratio: 6.6:1
- Campus size: 35 acres (140,000 m^{2})
- Colors: Maroon and White
- Slogan: Empowering Young Men for Life
- Athletics conference: Big North Conference (general); North Jersey Super Football Conference (football)
- Team name: Ironmen
- Rival: Bergen Catholic High School; Saint Joseph Regional High School
- Accreditation: Middle States Association of Colleges and Schools
- Newspaper: Ironman
- Yearbook: Bosconian
- School fees: $1,575 (Student, registration and capital improvement fes)
- Tuition: $20,925 (2025–26)
- Affiliation: Salesians
- Website: donboscoprep.org

Don Bosco Preparatory High School (Don Bosco Prep) is a private boys' Catholic high school for ninth through twelfth grades. Founded in 1915 as a boarding school for Polish boys, by the Salesians of Don Bosco, a religious community of priests and brothers, the school has a 35-acre (14 ha) campus in Ramsey, in Bergen County, in the U.S. state of New Jersey. It operates under the supervision of the Archdiocese of Newark.

About 2 miles (3 km) from the New Jersey – New York border, the school draws students from a wide region, including Bergen, Passaic, Morris, Essex and Sussex Counties in New Jersey and surrounding counties in New York.

As of the 2023–24 school year, the school had an enrollment of 786 and 119.1 classroom teachers (on an FTE basis), for a student–teacher ratio of 6.6:1. The student body was 68.4% White, 12.1% Hispanic, 9.5% two or more races, 5.9% Black, and 4.1% Asian.

== History ==
Don Bosco Prep was created in 1915 as a boarding school for boys from Poland. From 1915 to 1973, it housed resident students on the upper floors of St. Johns Hall. Freshmen were in the center wing and upperclassmen stayed on the top floor in the north annex. During the 1960s, about 75 students, or 10%, lived on campus. Resident students attended Mass each morning and were allowed to go home each weekend starting around 1963. Before that, weekend home visits were periodic.

== Accreditation ==
Don Bosco Prep was accredited by the Middle States Association of Colleges and Schools in 1960. It is a member of the Association for Supervision and Curriculum Development, the National Catholic Educational Association, the National Association of Secondary School Principals, the National Honor Society, and the New Jersey State Interscholastic Athletic Association.

== Athletics ==
The Don Bosco Ironmen compete in the Big North Conference, which includes public and private high schools in Bergen and Passaic Counties, and was established by the New Jersey State Interscholastic Athletic Association (NJSIAA) after sports leagues in Northern New Jersey were reorganized. With 1,278 students in grades 10–12, the school was classified by the NJSIAA for the 2019–20 school year as Non-Public A for most athletic competition purposes, which included schools with an enrollment of 381 to 1,454 students in that grade range (equivalent to Group IV for public schools). In the 2009–10 school year, the school competed in the North Jersey Tri-County Conference, which was established on an interim basis to facilitate realignment. Until the NJSIAA's 2009 realignment, the school had participated in Division C of the Northern New Jersey Interscholastic League, which included high schools located in Bergen County, Essex County and Passaic County, and was separated into three divisions based on NJSIAA size classification. The football team competes in the United Red division of the North Jersey Super Football Conference, which includes 112 schools competing in 20 divisions, making it the nation's biggest football-only high school sports league. The school was classified by the NJSIAA as Non-Public Group A (equivalent to Group III/IV/V for public schools) for football for 2024–2026, which included schools with 738 to 1,404 students.

The athletic teams are nicknamed the Ironmen and the school colors are maroon and white. In 2008 they were ranked as the number nine sports program in the nation by Sports Illustrated.

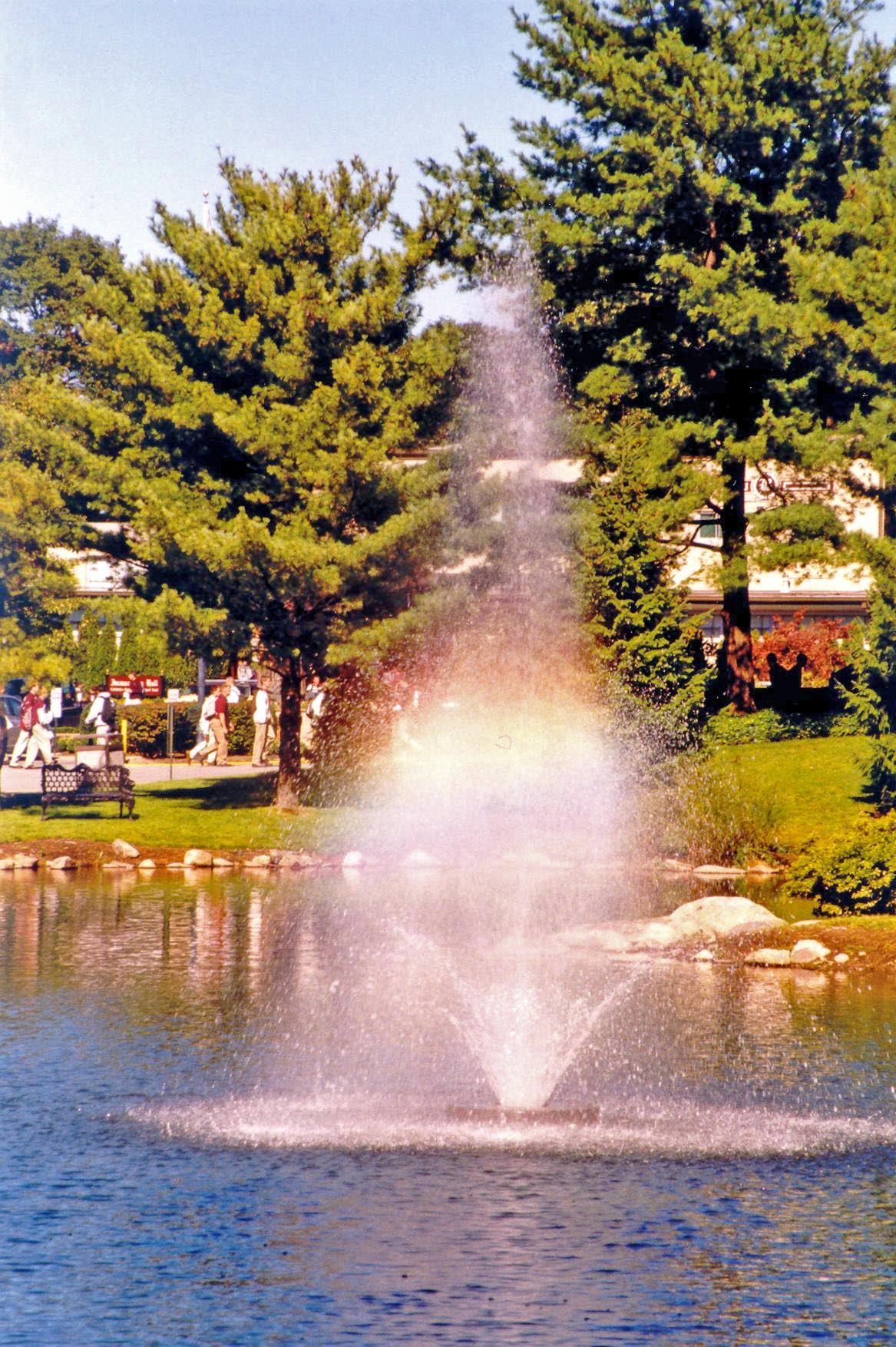
One of two fountains on the Ramsey, NJ campus.

Mary, Help of Christians Chapel in St. John's Hall is the center of religious activity on campus.

The school was the Group A winner of the NJSIAA ShopRite Cup in 2006–07. The award recognized the school for achieving a tie for third in boys' soccer, first in boys' cross country, first in football, second in wrestling, second in boys' indoor track and field relays, a tie for third in baseball, second in boys' golf, a tie for third in boys' lacrosse and second in boys' track and field.

=== Fall ===
The school fields football, soccer and cross country teams in the fall.

==== Cross country ====
The cross country team won its first New Jersey State Meets of Champions in 1992 under Tony Monks and Bill Barry and returned as Champions in 2007 and 2009 under Kevin Kilduff. The team won Non-Public A titles in four consecutive years from 2006 to 2009, and again in 2015. The Ironmen placed third at the Nike Northeast Regional Race, and placed 10th at Nike Team Nationals in Portland, Oregon in 2007. They ended Christian Brothers Academy's 11-year winning streak at the state group championships with their string of four wins, and in 2005 the freshman cross country team ended the 19-year streak of CBA in the NJCTCs. The squad finished sixth in the country at Nike Cross Nationals in 2008. The Ironmen were the best team not to make nationals in 2009, finishing 23rd in the country. Under the guidance of head coach Kevin Kilduff, the program was named North Jersey's "Program of the Decade" for 2000–2009.

==== Soccer ====
The soccer team were state runners-up in 2009 and are a perennial competitor for the state title. In 2009, they defeated Bergen Catholic High School in the Bergen County Tournament final 3–0, behind goals from Dylan Renna, Gio Esposito and Ryan McNamara. The Bergen County Coaches Association named Don Bosco's Ian Joyce and Steve Franchini to its All Decade Team, but selected Ramapo High School in 2010 as its Program of the Decade, despite both teams having won five championships in the ten-year span, citing the fact that Ramapo had beaten Don Bosco three of the four times the teams had played each other in the county championship.

==== Football ====
The school's football program has been a perennial contender for the New Jersey State Interscholastic Athletic Association Non-Public Group IV championship. The Ironmen have won 15 state championships, were declared winners in 1968, 1970 and 1973, and won playoff tournaments in Non-Public A North in 1983, 1984 and 1990, and in Non-Public Group IV in 2002, 2003, 2006–2011 and 2015.

The 1984 team won the Parochial A North sectional title by defeating Bergen Catholic High School by a score of 15–0 in the championship game, after having beaten Bergen Catholic 13–0 on Thanksgiving, making it the first time Bergen Catholic had been shutout in consecutive games in more than two decades.

The 1990 team finished the season with an 8–3 record after overcoming a 20-0 halftime deficit to win the Non-Public A North title with a 21–20 win against Queen of Peace High School in the championship game.

Prior to achieving National Champion status, the Don Bosco football team ended the 2002 season ranked No. 8 in the nation in USA Today's "Super 25" ranking of the best high school football teams in the country, was ranked No. 2 in the nation in the 2003 season and ranked No. 7 in the 2006 season. The team finished first overall in USA Today's regional rankings for the East at the end of those same three seasons.

In 2002, 2003, 2006 and 2010 the football team won the Star Ledger Trophy as the newspaper's top-ranked program in the New Jersey.

On September 27, 2008, the nationally ranked football team traveled to California, where they defeated De La Salle High School 23–21 on national television, the winning margin coming with 10 seconds left on a 19-yard field goal. A year later Don Bosco hosted De La Salle, defeating them 30–6 on September 12, 2009. Later that year the Ironmen travelled to Prattville, Alabama, to take on another nationally ranked team. That game was televised nationwide by ESPN. The Ironmen won 35–24. Don Bosco finished the season with a perfect 12–0 record and, following a number of weeks ranked second in the nation, was chosen 2009 National Champion when 2008 National Champion Saint Thomas Aquinas of Fort Lauderdale, Florida lost in the Florida State semi-finals. In 2009 the Ironmen became the first New Jersey team to be selected as the High School Football National Champion, finishing atop the lists of both the USA Today and the National Prep Poll rankings. Don Bosco repeated in 2011 as the National Champion of both the USA Today and the National Prep Poll.

The team won the Non-Public B title in 2015, defeating Saint Joseph Regional High School by a score of 21–10 to win the program's first title in four years.

Bosco has sent more than 200 football players to Division I colleges across the country.

The rivalry with Saint Joseph Regional High School was listed at 15th on NJ.com's 2017 list "Ranking the 31 fiercest rivalries in N.J. HS football". Don Bosco leads the rivalry with a 30–23 overall record as of 2017, which includes periods in the 1990s and 2010s when the two schools played each other on Thanksgiving. The rivalry with Bergen Catholic High School, dating back to 1958, was listed as the state's number-one rivalry, with Don Bosco in the lead at 38-28-2.

=== Winter ===
==== Basketball ====
The basketball Ironmen won the Non-Public A state championship in 1944 (defeating Camden Catholic High School in the tournament final), 1966 (vs. Christian Brothers Academy), 1968 (vs. Trenton Cathedral High School), 1970 (vs. Christian Brothers), 2017 (vs. St. Augustine Preparatory School) and 2018 (vs. Camden Catholic).

The 1966 team ended the year with a record of 25-2 after winning the Parochial A state championship at Convention Hall in Atlantic City with a 65–58 win in the tournament final against a Christian Brothers Academy team that had beaten them in the finals the previous season.

The 1968 team won the Parochial A title at Convention Hall with a 75–71 defeat of a Trenton Cathedral team that entered the championship game with a 26–0 record.

The team won the Parochial A title in 1970 with an 83–71 win in the championship game against Christian Brothers in a game played at Atlantic City's Convention Hall.

After a 47-year drought, the team won the 2017 Non-Public A title with a 69–66 win against St. Augustine. The Ironmen would repeat as Non-Public A state champions in 2018, defeating Camden Catholic High School by a score of 61–54 in the tournament final played at the RWJBarnabas Health Arena.

==== Bowling ====
The bowling team won the overall state championship in 1991 and 1993. The team took the 1991 title with a total score of 2,875 pins.

==== Ice hockey ====
The hockey team dates back to the 1960s. The team currently plays in the Gordon Conference. Frequently ranked among the top five teams in the state, the Ironmen have been to two state championships, and won the 2012 Gordon Conference Championship, four Bergen County championships, a Van Cott Cup and numerous other championships. Coach Greg Toskos, the all-time leading scorer at Don Bosco, has led the Ironmen since the 2006–07 season (his first two seasons as co-coach) and has a career 116-79-23 record.

==== Swimming ====
The swimming program was introduced in 2005. On January 5, 2008, Don Bosco swim team defeated Bergen Catholic High School, 98–72. It was Bergen Catholic's first dual meet loss in 23 years.

==== Fencing ====
The fencing team in the 2011–2012 season got second place in Section 4 district championships and was undefeated, going 13–0.

In the 2012-2013 fencing season, the Ironmen were again undefeated in District 4 dual meets, placed second in the District 4 tournament, and, for the first time in team history, advanced past the first round of the State Tournament to achieve a ranking of sixth in the state.

==== Indoor track and field ====
The indoor track team and field team rose to national prominence in the early 2000s, as the Ironman quartet of Steven Wexler, Jason Baker, Conor Sullivan and anchor leg Sharif Webb won the National Championship in the 3200m (4 × 800 m) relay at the 2006 National Scholastic Indoor Championships held in New York City. Four years later at the NSIC, the 2010 4x1 mile relay, led by an astonishing anchor from Michael Belgiovine (and also including Rafael Vargas, Howard Rosas and Phelan McCormack) earned second team All-American status for their runner-up finish in that race. In addition, the Ironmen won the Bergen County Relay Championships indoors for five consecutive years and have won numerous league/conference and invitational titles. The team captured the NJSIAA Non-Public "A" State Title at the Bennett Indoor Complex in Toms River, NJ. The program was named "Program of the Decade" by the Bergen County Coaches Association.

==== Wrestling ====
The wrestling team won the 2007 Non-Public North A state sectional championship with a 32–28 win against rival Bergen Catholic High School.

Razohnn Gross became the school's first individual wrestling champion when he won the 2012 title at 195 pounds in overtime against Eric McMullen of North Bergen High School. Gross won his second title in 2013 with a victory over Anthony Messner of Franklin High School. That same year, 2013, Luis Gonzalez became Don Bosco's second individual state champion when he earned first place at 113 pounds.

=== Spring ===
The school offers seven varsity sports in the spring season including baseball, golf, lacrosse, track & field, tennis, crew and volleyball.

The lacrosse, golf, and volleyball teams are teams on the rise. The golf team finished undefeated in 2009 and was ranked within the top five teams in the state.

==== Outdoor track and field ====
The Ironmen are six-time state champions in Spring track with wins in 1955, 1961, and 2006, and three consecutive titles in 2009, 2010, and 2011. The track team won county championships for several years running, and won many league and conference titles in the now-defunct NNJIL before joining the Big North Conference. In 2007, the Sprint Medley Relay (Jason Kelsey, Matthew Cato, Marvin Whilby and Sharif Webb) captured a national title at the Nike Outdoor Nationals held in Greensboro, North Carolina. In 2009, the 4x1 mile relay team earned All-American status with a fifth-place finish at the Nike Outdoor Nationals. The shuttle hurdle relay team, 4 × 400 m relay team and javelin thrower Tyler Yee medaled at the New Balance Outdoor Nationals in June 2011. Don Bosco Prep became one of the elite high school track and field programs in the nation in the 2000s/2010s, culminating in an eighth-place finish at the now-defunct Nike Track Nationals, held in Eugene, Oregon in June 2011.

The team was voted as "Program of the Decade" for 2000-2009 by the Record's track reporter, Paul Schwartz. Head Coach Rob DeCarlo Jr. was named "Coach of the Decade" for his efforts in leading the team since 2003, ending a 45-year state title drought in 2006. DeCarlo was honored as New Jersey Boys' Track "Coach of the Year" by The Star-Ledger in June 2011.

==== Baseball ====
The baseball team has won the county title nine times since 2000 and the state championship six times; the team won the Non-Public A North title in 1963 and won the State Non-Public A championship in 1979 (vs. Notre Dame High School), 1986 (vs. Red Bank Catholic High School), 1988 (vs. Holy Cross Preparatory Academy), 1989 (vs. St. Joseph High School of Metuchen), 1994 (vs. Monsignor Donovan High School), 2008 (vs. Christian Brothers Academy), 2022 (va. St. Augustine Preparatory School) and 2023 (vs. Red Bank Catholic). The eight state titles are tied for second-most in the state.

The team finished with a record of 15–11 in 1989 after winning the Parochial A title with a 3–1 defeat of St. Joseph of Metuchen, behind the pitching of future MLB pitcher C. J. Nitkowski.

The 1994 team defeated Monsignor Donovan by a score of 1–0 in the championship game to win the Parochial A state title and finish the season 21–9. The 2008 squad posted a record of 33-0 and won the Non-Public A state championship, and were ranked No. 1 in the nation by ESPNHS50 and No. 2 by USA Today. Former MLB pitcher Mike Stanton coached the team in 2010 before stepping down. In 2011 they went 25-1 and were 18th in the nation, according to MaxPreps Xcellent 25. In 2012 Don Bosco was pre-ranked at No. 6 in the nation by MaxPrepsand finished the season 26–4.

The Don Bosco baseball team faced Patterson's Eastside High School in the first baseball game played since 1997 at the renovated Hinchliffe Stadium on May 17, 2023.

==== Rowing ====
The rowing team has won two Scholastic Rowing Association of America National championships and two Stotesbury Cup gold medals. They have at one point possessed the title in every men's sculling category. The rowing team has only competed against Bergen Catholic High School once during the spring sprint season, in the Junior Quad head race qualifier at the 2010 Stotesbury Cup Regatta. In 2012 the varsity double (Aaron McAvey and Brian Sullivan) won the SRAA national championships. In 2017 the coxed lightweight four won the SRAA national championships under Coach Scott Menken. In 2023, the coxed second four won silver at the Stotesbury Cup Regatta.

==== Lacrosse ====
The boys' lacrosse team won the Non-Public A state championship in 2013 (defeating Seton Hall Prep in the tournament final) and 2021 (vs. Delbarton School). The 2021 team won the Tournament of Champions with a victory against Summit High School in the championship game.

== Notable alumni ==
- Matthew Bogdanos, New York City Assistant District Attorney and author of Thieves of Baghdad
- Clinton Calabrese (born 1986, class of 2004), politician who has represented the 36th Legislative District in the New Jersey General Assembly since 2018
- Don Guardian (born 1953, class of 1971), politician who has represented the 2nd Legislative District in the New Jersey General Assembly since 2022
- Marc Malusis (born 1976), sports anchor, talk show host, and reporter for PIX 11, SNY, and WFAN (AM)
- John Joseph O'Hara (born 1946), auxiliary bishop of the Archdiocese of Newark
- Jason Patric (born 1966 as Jason Patric Miller), actor, appeared in The Lost Boys and Sleepers
- John Pizzarelli (born 1960), jazz guitarist and singer
- Brandon Scoop B Robinson (born 1985), sports writer, radio host and television personality most notably with CBS Sports Radio
- Don Van Natta Jr. (born 1964), Pulitzer Prize-winning journalist at The New York Times and ESPN; bestselling author of First Off the Tee
- Alexander M. Zaleski (1906–1975), Bishop of Lansing from 1965 until his death

Athletes

- Nick Becker (born 2006, class of 2025), shortstop in the Seattle Mariners organization
- Jalen Berger (born 2001), American football running back for the Michigan State Spartans football team
- Chase Bisontis (born 2004), American football offensive tackle for the Texas A&M Aggies
- Nick Boyd (born 2001, transferred after sophomore year), college basketball player for the Wisconsin Badgers
- Leonte Carroo (born 1994), former wide receiver for the Miami Dolphins
- Caden Dana (born 2003), pitcher for the Los Angeles Angels
- Tommy DeVito (born 1998), quarterback who played for the New York Giants
- Mike Dietze (born 1989), professional soccer player who has played for the Philadelphia Fury of the American Soccer League
- Liam Fornadel (born 1999), guard who plays for the New England Patriots
- Brian Gaine, American football executive who was the general manager of the Houston Texans from 2018 to 2019
- Michael Ray Garvin (born 1986), former wide receiver for the Las Vegas Locomotives
- Joe Graf Jr. (born 1998), professional stock car racing driver who competes in the NASCAR Xfinity Series
- Ryan Grant (born 1982), former running back for the Green Bay Packers
- Dylan Harper (born 2006, class of 2024), professional basketball player for the San Antonio Spurs
- Ron Harper Jr. (born 2000, class of 2018), professional basketball player for the Boston Celtics
- Matt Hennessy (born 1997), offensive lineman for the Atlanta Falcons
- Thomas Hennessy (born 1994), long snapper for the New York Jets
- Ian Joyce (born 1985), goalkeeper for the Colorado Rapids who played professionally in England for Southend United
- Fred Mariani, former head football coach for the Iona Gaels football team
- Tommy McNamara (born 1991), professional soccer player who plays as a midfielder for New York City FC in Major League Soccer
- Jake Miller (born 2001), baseball pitcher in the Detroit Tigers organization
- Nick Minicucci, college football quarterback for the Delaware Fightin' Blue Hens
- Kyle Monangai (born 2002), American football running back for the Chicago Bears
- Al-Quadin Muhammad (born 1995), defensive end for the Indianapolis Colts of the National Football League
- Patrick Murray (born 1991), placekicker for the Tampa Bay Buccaneers
- C. J. Nitkowski (born 1973), former MLB pitcher
- Gary Nova (born 1993), football quarterback
- Jabrill Peppers (born 1995), strong safety for the New England Patriots of the NFL
- Chris Port (born 1967), former NFL offensive lineman who played for five seasons for the New Orleans Saints
- Matt Simms (born 1988), former quarterback at the University of Tennessee; son of former New York Giants' quarterback Phil Simms; signed by the Buffalo Bills
- Tommy Sweeney (born 1995), tight end for the New York Giants
- Mike Teel (born 1986), former record-setting quarterback at Rutgers University; drafted by the Seattle Seahawks; former head coach for Don Bosco; former WR coach at Rutgers University
- Brian Toal (born 1985), former linebacker/fullback for the New York Jets of the NFL
- Justin Trattou (born 1988), defensive end who played in the NFL for the New York Giants
- Marcus Valdez (born 1999), professional football defensive lineman who played for the Montreal Alouettes of the Canadian Football League
- Jason Vosler (born 1993), baseball third baseman for the San Francisco Giants
- Corey Wootton (born 1987), former defensive end who played in the NFL for the Chicago Bears, Minnesota Vikings and Detroit Lions
