= Financialization =

Term used in financial capital

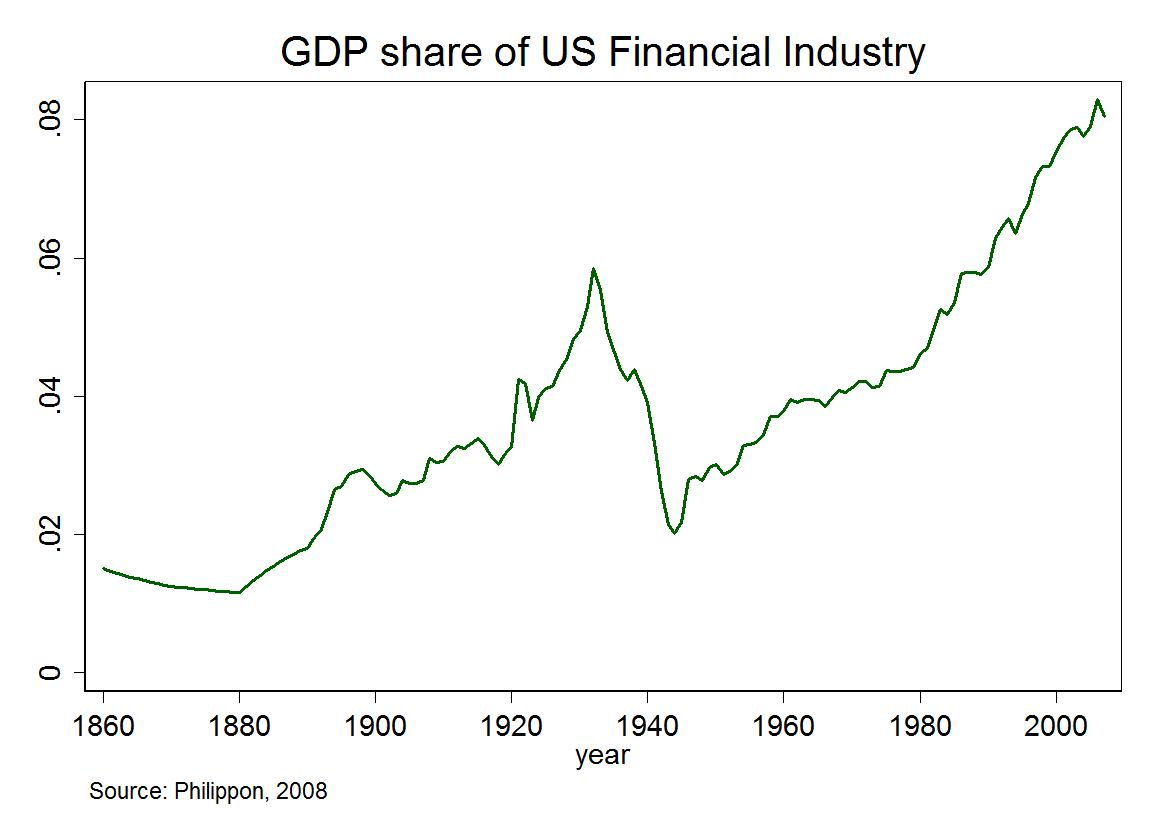
Share in GDP of US financial sector from 1860 to 2008

Financialization (or financialisation in British English) is a term sometimes used to describe the development of financial capitalism from 1980 to the present, a period during which debt-to-equity ratios increased, and financial services accounted for an increasing share of national income relative to other sectors.

Financialization describes an economic process by which exchange is facilitated through the intermediation of financial instruments. It may enable real goods, services, and risks to be more readily exchanged for currency, thereby making it easier for individuals to rationalize their assets and income flows.

Financialization is associated with the transition from an industrial economy to a service economy, as financial services belong to the tertiary sector of the economy.

== Specific academic approaches ==
Various definitions, focusing on specific aspects and interpretations, have been used:

- Greta Krippner of the University of Michigan writes that financialization refers to a "pattern of accumulation in which profit making occurs increasingly through financial channels rather than through trade and commodity production." In the introduction to the 2005 book Financialization and the World Economy, editor Gerald A. Epstein wrote that some scholars have insisted on a much narrower use of the term: the ascendancy of shareholder value as a mode of corporate governance, or the growing dominance of capital market financial systems over bank-based financial systems. Pierre-Yves Gomez and Harry Korine, in their 2008 book Entrepreneurs and Democracy: A Political Theory of Corporate Governance, have identified a long-term trend in the evolution of corporate governance of large corporations and have shown that financialization is one step in this process.
- Thomas Marois, looking at the big emerging markets, defines "emerging finance capitalism" as the current phase of accumulation, characterized by "the fusion of the interests of domestic and foreign financial capital in the state apparatus as the institutionalized priorities and overarching social logic guiding the actions of state managers and government elites, often to the detriment of labor."
- According to Gerald A. Epstein, financialization refers to "the increasing importance of financial markets, financial motives, financial institutions, and financial elites in the operation of the economy and its governing institutions, both at the national and international levels."
- Financialization may be defined as "the increasing dominance of the finance industry in the sum total of economic activity, of financial controllers in the management of corporations, of financial assets among total assets, of marketized securities and particularly equities among financial assets, of the stock market as a market for corporate control in determining corporate strategies, and of fluctuations in the stock market as a determinant of business cycles" (Dore 2002).
- More popularly, however, financialization is understood to mean the vastly expanded role of financial motives, financial markets, financial actors, and financial institutions in the operation of domestic and international economies.
- Sociological and political interpretations have also been made. In his 2006 book, American Theocracy: The Peril and Politics of Radical Religion, Oil, and Borrowed Money in the 21st Century, American writer and commentator Kevin Phillips presents financialization as "a process whereby financial services, broadly construed, take over the dominant economic, cultural, and political role in a national economy".

Jean Cushen explores how the workplace outcomes associated with financialization render employees insecure and angry.

== Roots ==
In the American experience, increased financialization occurred concomitant with the rise of neoliberalism and the free-market doctrines of Milton Friedman and the Chicago School of Economics in the late twentieth century. Various academic economists of that period worked out ideological and theoretical rationalizations and analytical approaches to facilitate the increased deregulation of financial systems and banking.

In a 1998 article, Michael Hudson discussed previous economists who saw the problems that resulted from financialization. Problems were identified by John A. Hobson (financialization enabled Britain's imperialism), Thorstein Veblen (it acts in opposition to rational engineers), Herbert Somerton Foxwell (Britain was not using finance for industry as well as Europe), and Rudolf Hilferding (Germany was surpassing Britain and the United States in banking that supports industry).

At the same 1998 conference in Oslo, Erik S. Reinert and Arno Mong Daastøl in "Production Capitalism vs. Financial Capitalism" provided an extensive bibliography on past writings, and prophetically asked

In the United States, probably more money has been made through the appreciation of real estate than in any other way. What are the long-term consequences if an increasing percentage of savings and wealth, as it now seems, is used to inflate the prices of already existing assets - real estate and stocks - instead of creating new production and innovation?

== Accelerated growth of the finance sector ==
The financial sector is a key industry in developed economies, in which it represents a sizable share of the GDP and an important source of employment. Financial services (banking, insurance, investment, etc.) have been for a long time a powerful sector of the economy in many economically developed countries. Those activities have also played a key role in facilitating economic globalization.

=== Early 20th century history in the United States ===
As early as the beginning of the 20th Century, a small number of financial sector firms have controlled the lion's share of wealth and power of the financial sector. The notion of an American "financial oligarchy" was discussed as early as 1913. In an article entitled "Our Financial Oligarchy," Louis Brandeis, who in 1913 was appointed to the United States Supreme Court, wrote that, "We believe that no methods of regulation ever have been or can be devised to remove the menace inherent in private monopoly and overwhelming commercial power" that is vested in U.S. finance sector firms. There were early investigations of the concentration of the economic power of the U.S. finance sector, such as the Pujo Committee of the U.S. House of Representatives, which in 1912 found that control of credit in America was concentrated in the hands of a small group of Wall Street firms that were using their positions to accumulate vast economic power. When in 1911 Standard Oil was broken up as an illegal monopoly by the U.S. government, the concentration of power in the U.S. financial sector was unaltered.

Key players of financial sector firms also had a seat at the table in devising the Central Bank of the United States. In November 1910, the five heads of the country's most powerful finance sector firms gathered for a secret meeting on Jekyll Island with U.S. Senator Nelson W. Aldrich and Assistant Secretary of the U.S. Treasury Department A. Piatt Andrew and laid the plans for the U.S. Federal Reserve System.

=== Deregulation and accelerated growth ===
In the 1970s, the financial sector comprised slightly more than 3% of total Gross Domestic Product (GDP) of the U.S. economy, while total financial assets of all investment banks (that is, securities broker-dealers) made up less than 2% of U.S. GDP. The period from the New Deal through the 1970s has been referred to as the era of "boring banking" because banks that took deposits and made loans to individuals were prohibited from engaging in investments involving creative financial engineering and investment banking.

U.S. federal deregulation in the 1980s of many types of banking practices paved the way for the rapid growth in the size, profitability, and political power of the financial sector. Such financial sector practices included creating private mortgage-backed securities, and more speculative approaches to creating and trading derivatives based on new quantitative models of risk and value. Wall Street ramped up pressure on the United States Congress for more deregulation, including for the repeal of Glass-Steagall, a New Deal law that, among other things, prohibits a bank that accepts deposits from functioning as an investment bank since the latter entails greater risks.

As a result of this rapid financialization, the financial sector scaled up vastly in the span of a few decades. In 1978, the financial sector comprised 3.5% of the American economy (that is, it made up 3.5% of U.S. GDP), but by 2007 it had reached 5.9%. Profits in the American financial sector in 2009 were six times higher on average than in 1980, compared with non-financial sector profits, which on average were just over twice what they were in 1980. Financial sector profits grew by 800%, adjusted for inflation, from 1980 to 2005. In comparison with the rest of the economy, U.S. nonfinancial sector profits grew by 250% during the same period. For context, financial sector profits from the 1930s until 1980 grew at the same rate as the rest of the American economy.

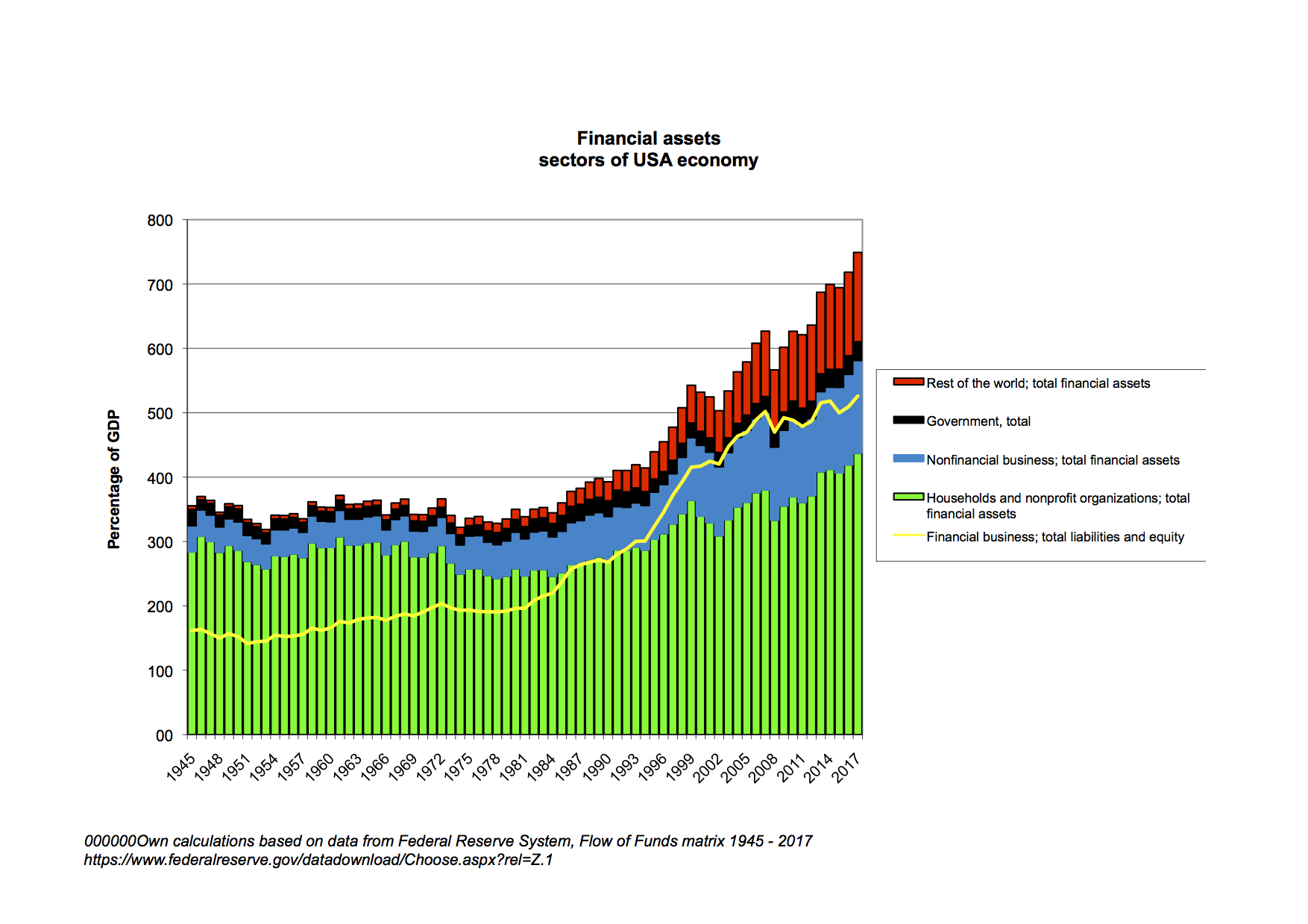
Assets of sectors of the United States

By way of illustration of the increased power of the financial sector over the economy, in 1978, commercial banks held $1.2 trillion (million million) in assets, which is equivalent to 53% of the GDP of the United States. By year's end 2007, commercial banks held $11.8 trillion in assets, which is equivalent to 84% of U.S. GDP. Investment banks (securities broker-dealers) held $33 billion (thousand million) in assets in 1978 (equivalent to 1.3% of U.S. GDP), but held $3.1 trillion in assets (equivalent to 22% U.S. GDP) in 2007. The securities that were so instrumental in triggering the 2008 financial crisis, asset-backed securities, including collateralized debt obligations (CDOs) were practically non-existent in 1978. By 2007, they comprised $4.5 trillion in assets, equivalent to 32% of the U.S. GDP.

=== Welfare state and financialization ===
Beyond regulatory changes, the underlying structure of welfare states has been found to significantly influence patterns of financialization. Research examining OECD countries suggests this relationship depends on the functional composition of social spending rather than aggregate welfare generosity. Certain welfare programs promote financialization by creating investable assets, while others reduce household dependence on financial markets.

Generous pay-as-you-go public pension systems crowd out private pension savings, as workers expecting public retirement benefits save less privately. Family benefits and sickness insurance providing direct income support similarly reduce household engagement with financial markets.

In contrast, housing policy including subsidies and mortgage interest deductions promotes financialization by stabilizing property values and rental income streams. Healthcare spending in systems relying on private insurance generates revenue streams that become tradeable assets, contributing to an "asset economy" where wealth inequality increasingly reflects asset ownership rather than income disparities.

== The development of leverage and financial derivatives ==
One of the most notable features of financialization has been the development of overleverage (more borrowed capital and less owned capital) and, as a related tool, financial derivatives: financial instruments, the price or value of which is derived from the price or value of another, underlying financial instrument. Those instruments, whose initial purpose was hedging and risk management, have become widely traded financial assets in their own right. The most common types of derivatives are futures contracts, swaps, and options. In the early 1990s, a number of central banks around the world began to survey the amount of derivative market activity and report the results to the Bank for International Settlements.

The number and types of financial derivatives have grown enormously. In November 2007, commenting on the 2008 financial crisis and the subprime mortgage crisis, Doug Noland's Credit Bubble Bulletin, on Asia Times Online, noted,

The scale of the Credit "insurance" problem is astounding. According to the Bank of International Settlements, the OTC market for Credit default swaps (CDS) jumped from $4.7 TN at the end of 2004 to $22.6 TN to end 2006. From the International Swaps and Derivatives Association we know that the total notional volume of credit derivatives jumped about 30% during the first half to $45.5 TN. And from the Comptroller of the Currency, total U.S. commercial bank Credit derivative positions ballooned from $492bn to begin 2003 to $11.8 TN as of this past June....

A major unknown regarding derivatives is the actual amount of cash behind a transaction. A derivatives contract with a notional value of millions of dollars may actually only cost a few thousand dollars. For example, an interest rate swap might be based on exchanging the interest payments on $100 million in US Treasury bonds at a fixed interest of 4.5%, for the floating interest rate of $100 million in credit card receivables. This contract would involve at least $4.5 million in interest payments, though the notional value may be reported as $100 million. However, the actual "cost" of the swap contract would be some small fraction of the minimal $4.5 million in interest payments. The difficulty of determining exactly how much this swap contract is worth, when accounted for on a financial institution's books, is typical of the worries of many experts and regulators over the explosive growth of these types of instruments.

Contrary to common belief in the United States, the largest financial center for derivatives (and for foreign exchange) is London. According to MarketWatch:

The global foreign exchange market, easily the largest financial market, is dominated by London. More than half of the trades in the derivatives market are handled in London, which straddles the time zones between Asia and the U.S. And the trading rooms in the Square Mile, as the City of London financial district is known, are responsible for almost three-quarters of the trades in the secondary fixed-income markets.

== Effects on the economy ==
During the 2008 financial crisis, several economists and others began to argue that financial services had become too large a sector of the US economy, with no real benefit to society accruing from the activities of increased financialization.

In February 2009, white-collar criminologist and former senior financial regulator William K. Black listed the ways in which the financial sector harms the real economy. Black wrote, "The financial sector functions as the sharp canines that the predator state uses to rend the nation. In addition to siphoning off capital for its own benefit, the finance sector misallocates the remaining capital in ways that harm the real economy in order to reward already-rich financial elites harming the nation."

Emerging countries have also tried to develop their financial sector, as an engine of economic development. A typical aspect is the growth of microfinance or microcredit, as part of financial inclusion.

Bruce Bartlett summarized several studies in a 2013 article indicating that financialization has adversely affected economic growth and contributes to income inequality and wage stagnation for the middle class. According to Marie Gottschalk, the increased financialization of the economy "facilitated an astounding upward redistribution of wealth and political power."

=== Cause of financial crises ===
On 15 February 2010, Adair Turner, the head of Britain's Financial Services Authority, said financialization was correlated with the 2008 financial crisis. In a speech before the Reserve Bank of India, Turner said that the 1997 Asian financial crisis was similar to the 2008 financial crisis in that "both were rooted in, or at least followed after, sustained increases in the relative importance of financial activity relative to real non-financial economic activity, an increasing 'financialisation' of the economy."

== Effects on political system ==
Some, such as former International Monetary Fund chief economist Simon Johnson, have argued that the increased power and influence of the financial services sector had fundamentally transformed American politics, endangering representative democracy itself through undue influence on the political system and regulatory capture by the financial oligarchy.

In the 1990s vast monetary resources flowing to a few "megabanks," enabled the financial oligarchy to achieve greater political power in the United States. Wall Street firms largely succeeded in getting the American political system and regulators to accept the ideology of financial deregulation and the legalization of more novel financial instruments. Political power was achieved through contributions to political campaigns, financial industry lobbying, and a revolving door that positioned financial industry leaders in key politically appointed policy making and regulatory roles and that rewarded sympathetic senior government officials with high-paying Wall Street jobs after their government service. The financial sector was the leading contributor to political campaigns since at least the 1990s, contributing more than $150 million in 2006. (This far exceeded the second largest political contributing industry, the healthcare industry, which contributed $100 million in 2006.) From 1990 to 2006, the securities and investment industry increased its political contributions six-fold, from an annual $12 to $72 million. The financial sector contributed $1.7 billion to political campaigns from 1998 to 2006, and spent an additional $3.4 billion on political lobbying, according to one estimate.

Policy makers such as Chairman of the Federal Reserve Alan Greenspan called for self-regulation.

== See also ==
- 2008 financial crisis
- Capital control
- Derivative (finance)
- Economic rent
- Economic sociology
- Enshittification
- Financial capital
- Financial economics
- FIRE economy
- Foreign exchange trading
- Late capitalism
- Neoliberalism
- Shadow banking system
- Tech bubble

== Sources ==
- Johnson, Simon; Kwak, James (2010). 13 Bankers: The Wall Street Takeover and the Next Financial Meltdown. Knopf Doubleday Publishing Group. ISBN 978-0-307-37922-1.
