= Marc Malusis =

Sports radio and television announcer and sportswriter (born 1976)

- Born: Marc Gerard Malusis; May 17, 1976 (age 50); Jackson Heights, Queens, U.S.
- Education: Don Bosco Prep; Syracuse University
- Occupations: Radio and television sportscaster Radio personality Journalist
- Years active: 2000–present
- Spouse: Donna Lore
- Children: 3

Marc Gerard Malusis (born May 17, 1976) is an American sports broadcaster, sportswriter, and radio personality (also known as "The Moose"), whose longstanding sports talk motto quickly became his signature catchphrase, "If you can't play it, talk it,"

== Early life and career ==
Born on May 17, 1976, in Jackson Heights, Queens, and raised in Rockland County, Malusis is one of three children born to Brenda Nancy (née Pinnel) and Paul Malusis. He attended Don Bosco Preparatory High School and graduated from Syracuse University, with a Bachelor of Science degree in speech communication.

By March 2000, Malusis had started his on-air career at WLIR AM, with The Sports Ticker, an hour-long Sunday morning broadcast, featuring "listener phone calls, analysis, interviews and sports reports". By the end of May, both the station's call letters and the program's title had changed; the former to WRCR, and the latter to On the Marc. July of that year marked the first in-print mention of his soon-to-be registered signature catchphrase, "If you can't play it, talk it."

Malusis started work at WFAN the following year, and his initial affiliation—extending from 2001 to 2007 (during which time he served first as board op and, later, producer for Mike and the Mad Dog)—proved extremely useful for Malusis, who later recalled, 'Mike understands what makes the New York sports fan tick.'

From January 2020 through December 2021, Malusis and Maggie Gray co-hosted the midday show on WFAN.

=== Television ===
In 2008, Malusis made what appears to be his TV debut, in the first of several "guest debater" spots on SNY's SportsNite. One observer who took great heart from this hire (and that of colleague Chris LoPresti), while, at the same time, was not overly optimistic regarding its long-range ramifications, is ESPN reporter / author Rich Coutinho.

People like Marc Malusis and Chris LoPresti give me hope that these TV debate shows could be more civil, which I believe will actually make them more useful. But I am a realist and know that the louder voices will usually get the bigger paychecks.

In February 2022, Malusis was hired as the lead sports anchor at WPIX. In May 2023, he was teamed with former Met pitcher Nelson Figueroa (later replaced by WFAN's Joe Benigno), co-hosting New York Sports Nation Nightly.

=== Journalism ===
Between 2016 and 2019, Malusis was a columnist for Metro New York, covering the gamut of New York professional franchises.

== Personal life ==
Following a December 2006 marriage proposal made on the steps of New York's St. Patrick's Cathedral, Malusis married kindergarten teacher Donna Lore on July 26, 2008, at St. Cecilia's Church in Stamford, Connecticut. They subsequently settled in Harrison, New York, and have since had three children, all boys.
