= Jeanne Safer =

American psychoanalyst and psychotherapist (born 1947)

Jeanne Safer (born 1947 in Cincinnati, Ohio) is an American psychoanalyst and psychotherapist who has written seven popular books on subjects including living with an abnormal sibling, choosing not to have children, and the many vicissitudes of love.

== Career ==
Safer has been a psychoanalyst and psychotherapist in private practice since 1974, and taught Clinical Assessment and Dream Interpretation for many years. She began writing professionally in her mid-forties, and published her first book, Beyond Motherhood: Choosing a Life Without Children, in 1996. Safer has written seven books (and contributed an essay to an eighth). Two of her books (Beyond Motherhood and The Normal One) were Finalists for the Books for a Better Life Award for Best Self-Improvement Books of the Year.

Safer's articles have appeared in The New York Times, The Wall Street Journal, The Washington Post, and other publications. The New York Times Book Review called hers "a deeply intelligent, fully informed, and thoroughly welcome voice."

Since 2018, Safer has presented the podcast I Love You But I Hate Your Politics, following on from her non-fiction book of the same name.

== Personal life ==
Safer has a BA degree in Philosophical Psychology from the University of Chicago and a PhD in Psychology from the New School for Social Research. Safer is also a Diplomate in Clinical Psychology, American Board of Professional Psychology. She has lived and worked in New York City since 1969.

Safer and her husband, historian and political journalist Richard Brookhiser, have written together for The Washington Post, appeared on CNN, and were profiled in Life Magazine and The New York Times about the pleasures and perils of their politically mixed marriage. They were the subjects of a segment on "The Daily Show" on "Inter-party Dating" in 2015.

== Books ==
- Beyond Motherhood: Choosing a Life without Children, Pocket Books, 1996, ISBN 0-671-79344-6
- Forgiving and Not Forgiving: Why Sometimes It’s Better Not to Forgive, Quill HarperCollins, 1999, ISBN 0-380-97579-3
- The Normal One: Life with a Difficult or Damaged Sibling Delta, 2002, ISBN 0-385-33756-6
- Death Benefits: How Losing a Parent Can Change an Adult’s Life—For the Better, 2008, Basic ISBN 978-0-465-07211-8
- Cain’s Legacy: Liberating Siblings from a Lifetime of Rage, Shame, Secrecy, and Regret, 2012, Basic ISBN 978-0-465-01940-3
- Selfish, Shallow and Self-Absorbed: Sixteen Writers on the Decision Not to Have Kids, (contributor), 2015, Picador ISBN 978-1-250-05293-3
- The Golden Condom and Other Essays on Love Lost and Found, 2016, Picador ISBN 978-1-250-05575-0
- I Love You, but I Hate Your Politics: How to Protect Your Intimate Relationships in a Poisonous Partisan World, 2019, All Points Books ISBN 9781250200396
