= Matthew Bogdanos =

American lawyer

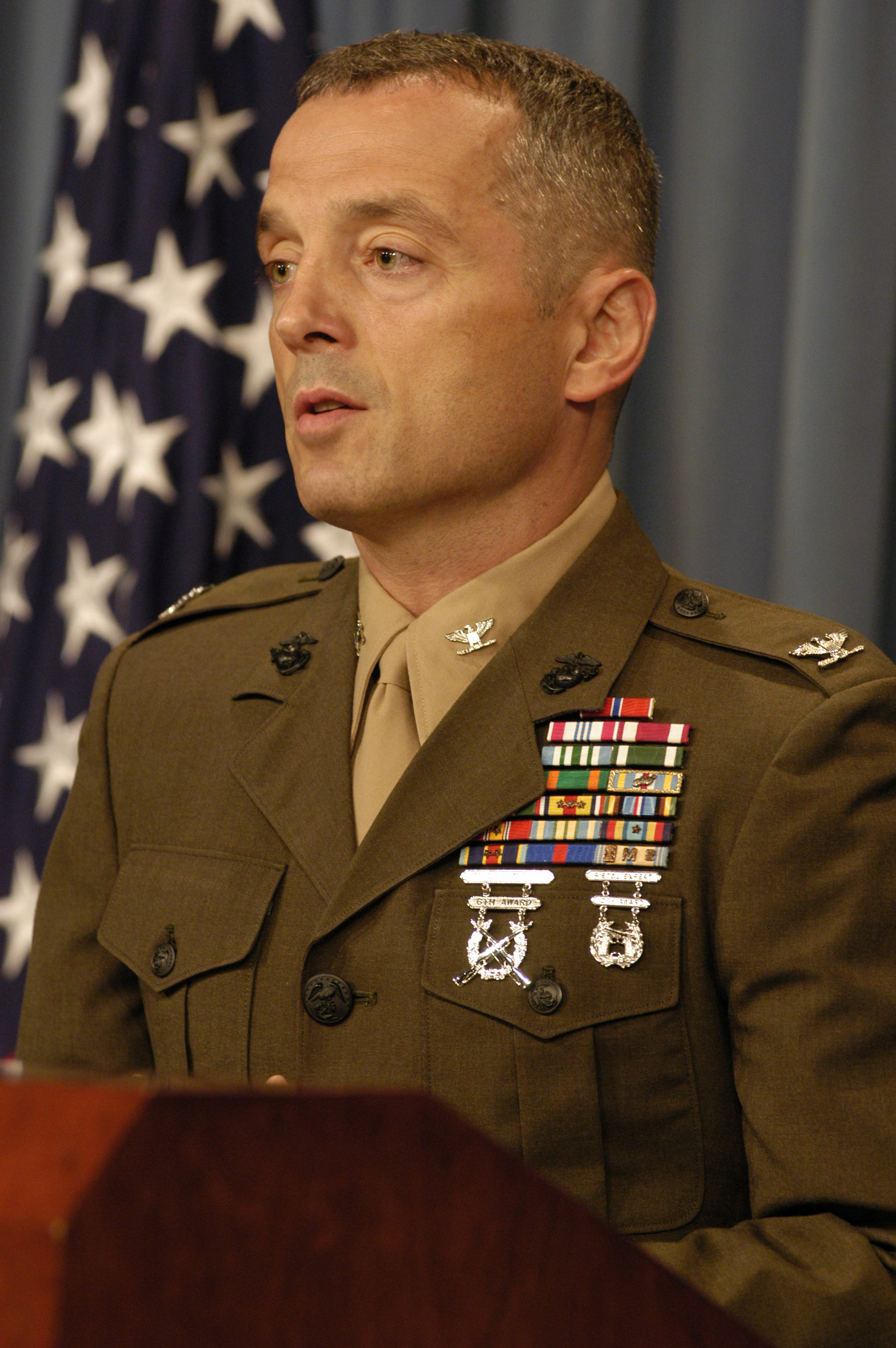
- Matthew Bogdanos speaking at pentagon press briefing on September 10, 2003
- Military career
- Allegiance: United States of America
- Branch: United States Marine Corps
- Service years: 1980–88, 2001–05, 2009–10 (active); 1988–2001, 2006–08 (reserve)
- Rank: Colonel
- Nickname: "pit bull"
- Conflicts: Operation Desert Storm; Operation Enduring Freedom; Operation Iraqi Freedom
- Awards: Bronze Star; National Humanities Medal
- Other work: Assistant D.A., author, boxer

Colonel Matthew Bogdanos is an American lawyer, author, boxer, and retired U.S. Marine colonel, who has served as an Assistant District Attorney in Manhattan specializing in the trafficking of Antiquities since 1988.

Following the September 11, 2001 attacks, Bogdanos deployed to Afghanistan where he was awarded a Bronze Star for actions against Al-Qaeda and the Taliban. In 2003, while on active duty in the Marine Corps, he led an investigation into the looting of Iraq's National Museum, and was subsequently awarded the National Humanities Medal for his efforts.

Returning to the District Attorney's Office in 2010, he created and still heads the Antiquities Trafficking Unit, “the only one of its kind in the world.” The unit investigated looted art and helped repatriate them to their countries of origin. Matthew Bogdanos has faced opposition during his tenure at the Antiquities Trafficking Unit from museums impacted by his investigations.

== Education ==
Bogdanos attended Don Bosco Preparatory High School in New Jersey and later Bucknell University in Pennsylvania. He holds a bachelor's in classical studies from Bucknell and a degree in law from Columbia University Law School. He also has a master's degree in Classical Studies from Columbia University and another Master's in Strategic Studies from the United States Army War College.

== Biography ==
Bogdanos is one of a set of twins born and raised in Kips Bay, Manhattan, New York to a Greek father, Konstantine, and a French mother, Claire. He is one of four children. Growing up he waited tables in his parents' Greek restaurant, Deno's Place, in lower Manhattan.

=== Military Service ===
Bogdanos enlisted into the United States Marine Corps Reserve in January 1977, while still a freshman. During his military service, he served as a military lawyer at Camp Lejeune for three years before joining the Manhattan District Attorney's Office in New York in 1988 and becoming a homicide prosecutor. Following the September 11, 2001 attacks, Bogdanos returned to full-time active duty.

In 1996, Bogdanos led a counter-narcotics action on the Mexico–United States border, he was active during Operation Desert Storm and served in South Korea, Lithuania, Guyana, Kazakhstan, Uzbekistan and Kosovo. In 2001, he was part of a law enforcement, counter-terrorism team deployed to Afghanistan, where he was awarded a Bronze Star for actions against Al-Qaeda for, according to the bronze Star citation, "seizing unexpected opportunities and relying on his personal courage often at great personal risk.

In 2001 Matthew Bogdanos gained national attention for the prosecution of Sean Combs, who was acquitted of weapons and bribery charges in a trial stemming from a 1999 nightclub shootout.

=== Combatting Looting ===
In March 2003, he was promoted to colonel and deployed to Iraq as head of the team. During his stint in Iraq, the Iraq Museum in Baghdad was sacked and thousands of valuable antiquities were stolen. For over five years Bogdanos led a team to recover the artifacts. Up to 2006, approximately 10000 artifacts were recovered through his efforts. Antiquities recovered include the Warka Vase and The Mask of Warka. Bogdanos wrote a memoir, Thieves of Baghdad: One Marine's Passion for Ancient Civilizations and the Journey to Recover the World's Greatest Stolen Treasures, which he co-wrote with William Patrick. The book chronicles his efforts to recover the missing Iraqi artifacts. In November 2005, he was awarded a National Humanities Medal from President George W. Bush for his efforts to recover the artifacts. He has also received the 2004 Public Service Award from the Hellenic Lawyers of America, the 2006 Distinguished Leadership Award from the Washington DC Historical Society, and a 2007 Proclamation from the City of New York, among other awards. Deployed to Afghanistan in 2009 with NATO counter-insurgency forces, he was released back into the Marine Reserves in September 2010, and returned to the District Attorney's Office.

=== Prosecutions and repatriations of smuggled antiquities ===
In 2006, he tried to form a New York task force to prosecute antiquities trafficking. He was initially rebuffed by his immediate bosses at the Manhattan District Attorney's Office. When Cyrus Vance Jr. became District Attorney in 2010, he authorized Bogdanos to prosecute antiquities trafficking, but with no additional resources assigned. For the next six years, he and Special Agent Brenton Easter, a federal agent with Homeland Security investigations, worked dozens of cases, including one of the largest seizures of stolen antiquities in U.S. history, more than 2600 idols valued at more than $143 million and seized from New York dealer Subhash Kapoor who was convicted of trafficking in India. By 2017, Bogdanos and Easter were making so many antiquities trafficking cases, that Bogdanos was sleeping in his office. When supervisors alerted District Attorney Vance, he approved the creation of the first-of-its-kind Antiquities Trafficking Unit consisting of prosecutors, federal agents, New York City detectives, and specialized analysts. By 2023, the Unit had grown to 17 personnel. Since 2010, Bogdanos and his team have convicted a dozen traffickers, seized more than 4000 antiquities valued at more than $200 million, and repatriated more than 2000 antiquities to almost two dozen countries. Among the seizures was a golden first-century-B.C. Egyptian coffin that the Metropolitan Museum of Art had acquired for $4 million and was made famous in the United States when Kim Kardashian posed for a photo next to the coffin at the 2018 Met Gala. Stolen from Egypt in 2011 and smuggled to the United States with a false provenance, the Nedjemankh coffin was repatriated to Egypt in 2019.

=== Other prosecutions ===
As a Senior Trial Counsel in the District Attorney's Office, Bogdanos still prosecutes homicides, what he describes as being "connected to the worst moment in people's lives." In 2015, Bogdanos successfully prosecuted pharmaceuticals executive Gigi Jordan for poisoning her 8-year-old autistic son, Jude, by forcing him to ingest hydrocodone, ambien, and Xanax, washing them down his throat with orange juice and vodka. Jordan was convicted of manslaughter and sentenced to 18 years in prison. In 2019, Bogdanos prosecuted Roderick Covlin of murdering his wealthy wife, Shele Covlin, for her money. Covlin tried to frame his 9-year-old daughter for the murder, but Bogdanos successfully disproved that defense. Covlin was sentenced to 25 years to life in prison.

== Criticism ==
=== Prosecutorial overreach ===
In September 2024, a legal dispute emerged between the Manhattan District Attorney's Antiquities Trafficking Unit and Aaron Mendelsohn, a California-based collector, over the ownership of an ancient Roman bronze statue. Matthew Bogdanos sought to seize the headless statue, alleging that it had been looted from an archaeological site in Turkey during the 1960s.

Mendelsohn's lawyers contested the seizure in court, arguing that the New York investigators lacked both jurisdiction and sufficient evidence to justify their actions. They accused the Antiquities Trafficking Unit of employing intimidation tactics to compel Mendelsohn to surrender the statue without due legal process. The defense maintained that the burden of proof rested with the Antiquities Trafficking Unit, asserting that the New York investigators were attempting to circumvent a transparent legal procedure that would require them to substantiate their claims with concrete evidence. Mendelsohn's legal team stated that should the statue be definitively proven to have been looted, Mendelsohn would willingly return it to Turkey.

According to The New York Times, this case, along with others involving institutions such as the Cleveland Museum of Art and the Art Institute of Chicago, could have significant implications for the authority of the Manhattan District Attorney's office in pursuing artifacts beyond New York, particularly concerning issues of evidence and jurisdiction.

The National Review cites this case in an article discussing allegations of overreach and abuse of power in Bogdanos’ efforts to seize and repatriate antiquities. Critics argue that this aggressive approach amounts to a “shakedown,” where collectors and institutions are coerced into giving up their art without a proper legal trial. Many fear the reputational damage and financial costs of lengthy legal battles, leading them to comply with the DA's demands. In addition, the article criticizes the DA's jurisdictional reach, arguing that the office is overstepping its bounds by targeting artifacts with only tenuous connections to New York.

=== Controversial return of Tibetan cultural relics ===
In May 2024 the New York District Attorney's Office Anti-Trafficking Unit returned 38 Tibetan Buddhist artifacts to the People's Republic of China (PRC). The artifacts, said to originate from the Yuan, Ming, and Qing dynasties, included bronzes, ivory carvings, and mural fragments. The authenticity and historical attribution of these objects were questioned by art experts. The repatriation, conducted by Assistant District Attorney Matthew Bogdanos, was seen by some as an attempt to bolster U.S.-China relations. The PRC media celebrated the return as a positive step for cultural relations.

However, the move has sparked controversy, particularly within the Tibetan community. Lama Wangchuk Gyaltsen, a Tibetan elder, criticized the return, accusing China of continuing to oppress Tibetan culture and questioning the legality and ethics of returning artifacts to a government that has historically suppressed Tibetan heritage. U.S. policy, historically sympathetic to Tibetan cultural preservation, stands in contrast to the State Department's Memorandum of Agreement (MOU) with the PRC, which has been extended despite opposition from advocates for Tibetan and Uyghur minorities.

The Dalai Lama has previously endorsed the preservation of Tibetan artifacts in U.S. museums, viewing them as safer than in Chinese custody. The return of these objects is seen by critics as a violation of U.S. cultural policy and human rights principles, particularly in light of China's ongoing repression of Tibetan culture, language, and religion.

=== Repatriation of fake antiquities ===
In 2023, the Manhattan District Attorney's Office found itself embroiled in controversy after allegations surfaced that it had repatriated fake Roman mosaics to Lebanon. The case revolves around nine mosaic panels, purported to be ancient Roman artefacts, that were returned to Lebanon as part of a broader effort to combat antiquities trafficking. However, leading academics from France and Britain, including Djamila Fellague of the Grenoble Alpes University, have since cast doubt on the authenticity of the mosaics. They claim that eight out of the nine panels are modern forgeries, making the case a potentially embarrassing mistake for the New York authorities.

Djamila Fellague, an expert in Roman art and archaeology, has provided detailed evidence that suggests the mosaics are not authentic. According to her research, the designs of the alleged fakes were copied from well-known Roman mosaics housed in museums and archaeological sites in Italy, Tunisia, Algeria, and Turkey. For example, Fellague identified one mosaic panel, depicting an Anguiped Giant, as a clear imitation of a section from the famous mosaics in the Villa Romana del Casale in Sicily, a UNESCO World Heritage Site. Another mosaic, featuring Neptune and his wife Amphitrite, appears to be based on a Roman mosaic found in Constantine, Algeria, that has been displayed in the Louvre in Paris since the mid-19th century. Out of the nine mosaics returned to Lebanon, Fellague claims only one appears to have been inspired by an actual Lebanese artefact — a depiction of Bacchus from the National Museum of Beirut.

The Manhattan District Attorney's Office had announced the return of the mosaics in September 2023, as part of a broader effort to repatriate Middle Eastern and North African antiquities that had been allegedly trafficked into New York. The office's Antiquities Trafficking Unit (ATU) obtained a warrant for the arrest of a Lebanese antiquities trafficker and issued an Interpol red notice in 2022. The nine mosaics were part of a collection of looted artefacts believed to have been brought into New York illegally. However, as soon as Fellague saw photographs of the mosaics in the press, she immediately sensed that most were "obvious fakes" and began her investigation.

Fellague's research led her to believe that the forgeries may have been created in a workshop located in the Middle East, likely during the 1970s or 1980s, based on the style and techniques used. Despite these accusations, a spokesperson for the Manhattan District Attorney's Office denied the claims. They argued that the mosaics had been authenticated by experts during the legal proceedings and that a court had evaluated the evidence before authorising their return to Lebanon. “The court found, based on the evidence — which these individuals do not have — that the pieces are authentic,” the spokesperson stated.

Critics, however, remain unconvinced, pointing to the lack of transparency and scientific rigor in the authentication process. Fellague, along with other experts, has called for further investigation into the matter, arguing that the case highlights the need for more robust due diligence in cases involving the repatriation of cultural heritage.

=== Inflated claims about the illicit antiquities trade ===
Cultural Property News has raised concerns about Matthew Bogdanos for supporting claims regarding the size of the illicit antiquities trade. In a 2011 opinion piece for CNN, Bogdanos expressed doubts about the widely cited figure that the trade is worth billions of dollars, noting the challenges in accurately assessing the scale of the trade due to its clandestine nature. He argued that comparisons to the drug and weapons trades were not based on reliable data.

Cultural Property News referenced reports from the World Customs Organization (WCO) since 2015, which indicate that cultural heritage trafficking, including antiquities, represents a small portion of global illicit trade. Additionally, a 2020 report by the RAND Corporation found no evidence to support the claim of a multi-billion-dollar antiquities market.

Despite these findings, media releases from the District Attorney's office in 2023 continued to describe antiquities trafficking as a “multi-billion-dollar business.” Cultural Property News questioned why Bogdanos had not addressed or corrected these statements, suggesting that greater transparency may be needed.

The publication also pointed to instances where the District Attorney's office had potentially overstated the value of items involved in cases. For example, the office claimed that 19 items returned to Italy were valued at $19 million, though experts from the antiquities field disputed this valuation. Cultural Property News suggested that such overestimations could contribute to a perception of a larger-scale illicit trade than what is supported by available evidence.

=== Using research without attribution ===
Christos Tsirogiannis, a forensic archaeologist and expert on antiquities trafficking, has publicly accused the Manhattan District Attorney's Antiquities Trafficking Unit of using his research without proper attribution. Tsirogiannis, who heads the UNESCO group on illicit antiquities trafficking, has assisted the unit for several years in identifying looted artefacts and facilitating their repatriation, particularly those connected to known traffickers.

The controversy arose after the unit announced the recovery of two 4th-century marble statuettes, claiming credit for their identification without acknowledging Tsirogiannis’ role. The statuettes, depicting the mythological figures Castor and Pollux, had been looted from Lebanon and were later seized from the Metropolitan Museum of Art. Tsirogiannis asserts that his 2012 doctoral research, which remains under restricted access at the University of Cambridge, was crucial in proving the objects' illicit origins.

Tsirogiannis has called for greater transparency and proper recognition of expert contributions in such cases. The Manhattan DA's office has not responded publicly to the claims.

== Personal life ==
Bogdanos has four children with his wife, Claudia Tuchman Bogdanos, a lawyer at Quinn Emanuel Urquhart & Sullivan. One of his sons, Michael, is also a Marine Infantry Officer.

His favourite books are Miguel de Cervantes's Don Quixote and Homer's Iliad.

Bogdanos is also a former middleweight boxer with almost 30 amateur fights and is still boxing, with a record of 10-2 since his 40th birthday. Along with another Assistant District Attorney, fellow U.S. Marine officer Al Peterson, he co-founded a Charity Boxing Foundation called Battle of the Barristers that has raised more than $1 million for wounded veterans and children at risk.

== Awards and recognition ==
=== Military awards ===

| 1st Row | | Defense Superior Service Medal w/ 1 oak leaf cluster | Bronze Star | |
| 2nd Row | Defense Meritorious Service Medal | Meritorious Service Medal | Joint Service Commendation Medal | Navy and Marine Corps Commendation Medal |
| 3rd Row | Joint Service Achievement Medal | Navy and Marine Corps Achievement Medal | Joint Meritorious Unit Award w/ 3 oak leaf clusters | Navy Meritorious Unit Commendation w/ 1 service star |
| 4th Row | Selected Marine Corps Reserve Medal w/ 3 service stars | National Defense Service Medal w/ 1 service star | Armed Forces Expeditionary Medal | Afghanistan Campaign Medal w/ 1 service star |
| 5th Row | Iraq Campaign Medal w/ 3 service stars | Global War on Terrorism Expeditionary Medal | Global War on Terrorism Service Medal | Military Outstanding Volunteer Service Medal |
| 6th Row | Navy Sea Service Deployment Ribbon w/ 2 service stars | Navy & Marine Corps Overseas Service Ribbon w/ 4 service stars | Marine Corps Recruiting Ribbon | Armed Forces Reserve Medal w/ 4 mobilizations |

=== Other awards ===
- Ellis Island Medal of Honor – May 2011
- Grand Marshal, Greek Independence Day Parade, New York City – 2010
- City of Philadelphia Proclamation – February 2009
- New York City Proclamation – April 2007
- Distinguished Leadership Award, Washington DC Historical Society – June 2006
- National Humanities Medal, from President George W. Bush, White House – November 2005
- Hellenic Lawyers Association Public Service Award – November 2004

== Publications ==
- "Joint Interagency Coordination Groups: The First Step" (PDF). Joint Force Quarterly. March 2005. Archived from the original (PDF) on June 1, 2005.
- Thieves of Baghdad is his first-hand account of his journey to recover Iraq's lost treasures. His royalties from the sale of the book go to the Iraq Museum.

Bogdanos, Matthew; William Patrick (2005). Thieves of Baghdad: One Marine's Passion for Ancient Civilizations and the Journey to Recover the World's Greatest Stolen Treasures. Bloomsbury USA. ISBN 1-58234-645-3.

- "The Terrorist in the Art Gallery (Op-Ed)". New York Times. December 10, 2005.
- "Fighting for Iraq's Culture (Op-Ed)". New York Times. March 6, 2007.
- "The Strategic Value of Heritage Training," with Dr. Laurie Rush" (PDF), Joint Force Quarterly, Second Quarter 2009
- Casualties of War: The Looting of the Iraq Museum, Museum News, March–April 2006
- "Casualties of War: Truth and the Iraq Museum", American Journal of Archaeology, April 2005
- On the Trail of the Iraq Museum's Treasures, Wall Street Journal, 18 September 2003
- Rothfield, Lawrence, ed. (2008). "The Way Ahead: a Five-Point Action Plan For Future Actions". Antiquities under Siege. Plymouth, United Kingdom: Altamira.
- Schaeffer, Frank, ed. (2004). "Combat Afghanistan". Voices From The Front. New York: Carroll & Graf Publishers.
- Leadership and the Bond that Ties, Marine Corps Gazette, December 2009
- Till Death Do Us Part, Washington Post Op-Ed, 16 August 2009, archived from the original on 15 December 2013
- The Gathering Storm, Marine Corps Gazette, May 2009
- Duties That Are Best Shared, Washington Post Op-Ed, 1 March 2009, archived from the original on 15 December 2013
- Transforming Joint Interagency Operations (PDF), National Defense University, Center for Technology and National Security Policy, August 2007
- The Art of War, Marine Corps Gazette, June 2007
- Interagency Operations: The Marine Specialty of this Century, Marine Corps Gazette, March 2006
- Pieces of the Cradle, Marine Corps Gazette, January 2005
- Joint Interagency Coordination: Every Tool in Our Arsenal, Army War College, July 2004
- Pursuit of Excellence, Marine Corps Gazette, August 2001
- Chancellorsville: You Can Lead a Horse to Water, Marine Corps Gazette, July 1997
- Through Soldier's Eyes, Marine Corps Gazette, July 1997
- Rothfield, Lawrence, ed. (2008). "See No Evil: Museums, Art Collectors & Black Markets They Adore". Antiquities under Siege. Plymouth, United Kingdom: Altamira.
- Seidemann, Joel J., ed. (2004). "Celebrity Crime in the Spotlight". In the Interest of Justice: The Great Opening and Closing Arguments of the Last 100 Years. New York: Regan Books.
- "Combating Global Traffic in Stolen Antiquities", Fordham International Law Journal, 31, February 2008
- "Search and Seizure: A Reasoned Approach", Pace Law Review, 6 (4), Summer 1986
- Finn Jr., Chester E.; Ravitch, Diane, eds. (2007). "Excellence for Its Own Sake". Beyond the Basics: Achieving a Liberal Education for All Children. Washington, D.C.: Thomas B. Fordham Institute.

== See also ==
- National Museum of Iraq
