= Richard Brookhiser =

American journalist, biographer and historian

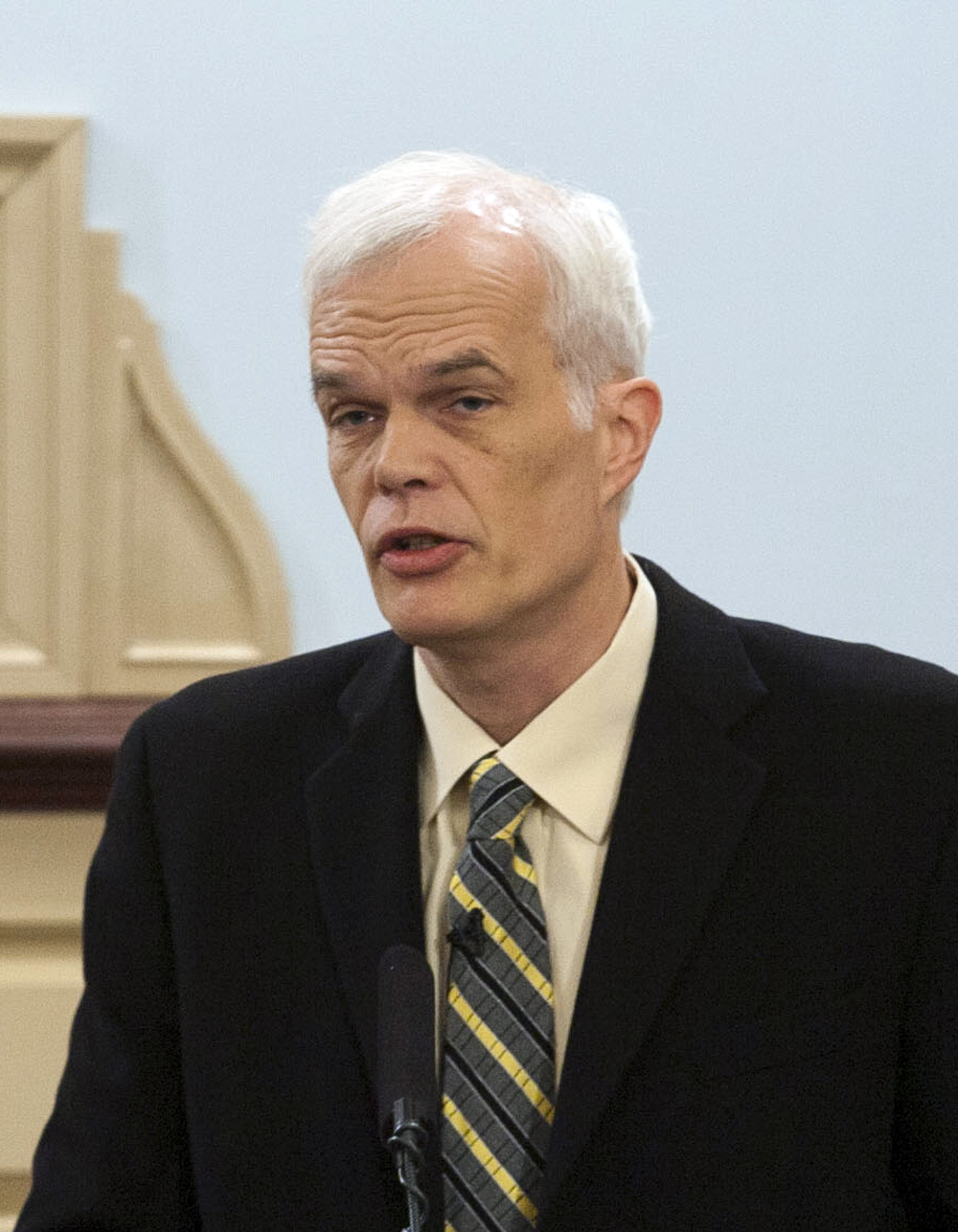
- Richard Brookhiser, 2011
- Born: July 23, 1955 (age 71); Irondequoit, New York, U.S.
- Education: Yale University (BA)
- Occupations: Journalist; author; editor; historian
- Known for: National Review

Richard Brookhiser (/ˈbrʊkhaɪzər/; born February 23, 1955) is an American journalist, biographer, and historian. He is a senior editor at National Review. He is most widely known for a series of biographies of the Founding Fathers of the United States, including Alexander Hamilton, Gouverneur Morris, and George Washington.

== Life and career ==
Brookhiser was born in Irondequoit, a suburb north of Rochester, New York. His father worked for Eastman Kodak in Rochester and was a lieutenant in the Army Air Corps during World War II. He has written books that deal with the nation's founding and the principles of its founders, including What Would the Founders Do?, a book describing how the Founding Fathers would approach topical issues that generate controversy in modern-day America.

Brookhiser began writing for National Review in 1970. His first article, done on antiwar protests when he was 15 in high school, was a cover story in National Review in 1970. He earned an A.B. degree (1977) at Yale. In his freshman year he took a class on Thomas Jefferson taught by Garry Wills. He was also a member of the Calliopean Society. Although admitted to Yale Law School, Brookhiser went to work full-time for National Review in 1977; by the time he was 23, he was a senior editor, the youngest in the magazine's history. He was selected as the successor to the magazine's founder, William F. Buckley Jr., until Buckley changed his mind. For a short time he wrote speeches for Vice President George H. W. Bush.

He has written for a variety of magazines and newspapers. Brookhiser's work has appeared in the "Talk of the Town" section of The New Yorker magazine as well as in The New York Times, The Wall Street Journal, Cosmopolitan, The Atlantic Monthly, Time, and Vanity Fair. In 1987 he began a column for The New York Observer, which he wrote until 2007.

Brookhiser wrote and hosted the documentary films Rediscovering George Washington, by Michael Pack, broadcast on PBS on July 4, 2002, and Rediscovering Alexander Hamilton, also by Pack, broadcast on PBS on April 11, 2011. His book Alexander Hamilton, American led to the "Alexander Hamilton: The Man Who Made Modern America" exhibition at The New-York Historical Society (2004–2005), for which he was the historian curator. He received an honorary doctorate degree in 2005 from Washington College.

In 2008, President George W. Bush awarded Brookhiser the National Humanities Medal in a White House ceremony.

== Cancer and marijuana use ==
Brookhiser became ill with testicular cancer in 1992 and smoked marijuana to alleviate nausea from chemotherapy. (Before that, he had smoked marijuana in college about ten times, he said.)

"Because of the marijuana, my last two courses of chemotherapy were almost nausea-free," he said in 1996. "My cancer is gone now. I was lucky."

On March 6, 1996, he testified before a Congressional committee about using marijuana, urging the committee members to support decriminalization of marijuana for medical purposes.

"My support for medical marijuana is not a contradiction of my principles, but an extension of them," Brookhiser told the House Judiciary Committee's Subcommittee on Crime. "I am for law and order. But crime has to be fought intelligently and the law disgraces itself when it harasses the sick. I am for traditional virtues, but if carrying your beliefs to unjust ends is not moral, it is philistine."

== Personal life ==
He lives in Manhattan (East Village) with his wife, Jeanne Safer, a psychotherapist and author, most recently, of The Normal One. They also have a home in Ulster County in the Catskills.

== Books ==
External videos
- Washington Journal interview with Brookhiser on Give Me Liberty, December 30, 2019, C-SPAN
- Presentation by Brookhiser on John Marshall: The Man Who Made the Supreme Court, November 27, 2018, C-SPAN
- Presentation by Brookhiser on Founders' Son: A Life of Abraham Lincoln, October 21, 2014, C-SPAN
- Presentation by Brookhiser on James Madison: The Father of American Politics, February 3, 2011, C-SPAN
- Presentation by Brookhiser on James Madison, September 16, 2011, C-SPAN
- Presentation by Brookhiser on Right Time, Right Place, June 10, 2009, C-SPAN
- Discussion with Brookhiser on Right Time, Right Place, December 8, 2009, C-SPAN
- After Words interview with Brookhiser on What Would the Founders Do?, May 27, 2006, C-SPAN
- Presentation by Brookhiser on Gentleman Revolutionary: Gouverneur Morris, June 10, 2003, C-SPAN
- Presentation by Brookhiser on America's First Dynasty, April 7, 2002, C-SPAN
- Interview with Brookhiser on Alexander Hamilton: American, September 27, 1998, C-SPAN
- Presentation by Brookhiser on Alexander Hamilton: American, March 10, 1999, C-SPAN
- Presentation by Brookhiser on Alexander Hamilton: American, April 4, 2001, C-SPAN
- Presentation by Brookhiser on Alexander Hamilton: American, July 12, 2016, C-SPAN
- Presentation by Brookhiser on Founding Father, November 8, 1996, C-SPAN
- Presentation by Brookhiser on Founding Father, April 18, 1996, C-SPAN
- Booknotes interview with Brookhiser on The Way of the WASP, March 24, 1991, C-SPAN

- Glorious Lessons: John Trumbull, Painter of the American Revolution, 276 pages (Yale University Press: 2024) ISBN 0300259700
- Give Me Liberty: A History of America's Exceptional Idea, 304 pages (Basic Books: 2019) ISBN 978-1-5416-9913-7
- John Marshall: The Man Who Made the Supreme Court, 324 pages (Basic Books: 2018) ISBN 978-0-465-09622-0
- Founders' Son: A Life of Abraham Lincoln, 376 pages (Basic Books: 2014) ISBN 978-0-465-03294-5
- James Madison, 304 pages (Basic Books: 2011) ISBN 0-465-01983-8
- Right Time, Right Place: Coming of Age with William F. Buckley Jr. and the Conservative Movement, 272 pages (Basic Books: 2009) ISBN 978-0-465-01355-5
- George Washington on Leadership, 269 pages (Basic Books: 2008) ISBN 978-0-465-00302-0
- What Would the Founders Do?: Our Questions, Their Answers, 261 pages (Basic Books: 2006) ISBN 0-465-00819-4 Contents links.
- Gentleman Revolutionary: Gouverneur Morris, the Rake Who Wrote the Constitution, 272 pages (Free Press: 2003) ISBN 0-7432-2379-9
- Rules of Civility: The 110 Precepts That Guided Our First President in War and Peace, 90 pages (University of Virginia Press: 2003) ISBN 0-8139-2218-6
- America's First Dynasty : The Adamses, 1735–1918, 256 pages (Free Press: 2002) ISBN 0-684-86881-4
- George Washington: A National Treasure, 104 pages (National Portrait Gallery, Smithsonian Institution: 2002) ISBN 0-295-98236-5
- Fighting the Good Fight: A History of the New York Conservative Party, 434 pages (St. Augustine's Press: 2002) ISBN 1-58731-251-4
- (Contributor) Patriot Sage: George Washington and the American Political Tradition, editors Gary L. Gregg, Matthew Spalding, William J. Bennett, 355 pages (ISI Books: 1999) ISBN 1-882926-38-2
- Alexander Hamilton, American, 240 pages (Free Press: 1999) ISBN 0-684-83919-9
- Founding Father: Rediscovering George Washington, 240 pages (Free Press: 1996) ISBN 0-684-82291-1
- Way of the Wasp: How It Made America, and How It Can Save It, So to Speak, 171 pages (Free Press: 1990) ISBN 0-02-904721-8
- The Outside Story (Doubleday reissue edition: 1986) ISBN 0-385-19679-2
