= William Patrick (author) =

American editor and novelist (born 20th century)

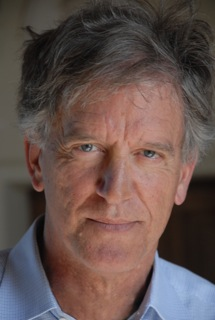
Photo of William Patrick

William Patrick (born 20th century) is an American editor, book doctor, ghostwriter, and writer.

He is the co-author of Loneliness: Human Nature and the Need for Social Connection. He has also written two suspense novels.

== Career ==
Patrick began his career at Little, Brown and Company, then moved to Harvard University Press, where he acquired and edited works by writers including Edward O. Wilson and Jane Goodall.

While working at Harvard, he wrote Spirals (Houghton), a novel set in Cambridge, Massachusetts, during the early days of cloning and recombinant DNA research. His next work of fiction was Blood Winter (Viking Press), a thriller about germ warfare; The Wall Street Journal described it as "A dazzling achievement, both gripping and moving, lurid and achingly sad….as authoritative as the fresh early best of Greene and le Carre".

Returning to commercial publishing, Patrick acquired a number of bestsellers in humanistic psychology, including Minding the Body, Mending the Mind by psychologist and immunologist Joan Borysenko.

In 1991, he published Iron John: A Book About Men which was number one on The New York Times Best Seller list for ten weeks, and remained on the list for more than a year.

A freelancer since 1999, Patrick has helped shape a number of significant books, including Tim Weiner's Legacy of Ashes, winner of the 2007 National Book Award for non-fiction. That same year, The Measure of a Man: A Spiritual Autobiography, which he co-wrote with actor Sidney Poitier, was a selection of the Oprah Book Club that was number one on The New York Times paperback bestseller list for 13 weeks.

In 2013, he co-wrote In My Shoes with Jimmy Choo fashion house founder Tamara Mellon, and edited 10% Happier for then-ABC News correspondent Dan Harris.

== See also ==
- List of American novelists
- List of people from Massachusetts
