= What Would the Founders Do? =

- Author: Richard Brookhiser
- Language: English
- Publication place: United States
- ISBN: 0-465-00819-4

What Would the Founders Do?: Our Questions, Their Answers is a 2006 non-fiction book by American journalist and historian Richard Brookhiser. The author discusses the viewpoints, backgrounds, and character traits of the American Founding Fathers and compares and contrasts them with the socio-political debates of present-day Americans. Brookhiser states, "We can be as intelligent as they were, and as serious, as practical, and as brave." The book was published by Basic Books.

Some of the issues detailed include the death penalty, gun control, censorship, assisted suicide, preemptive war, Indian casinos, campaign finance reform, and term limits.

== Reviews ==
The book received favorable reviews from American Heritage, where editor Richard Snow called it "a great piece of work it" as well as "[l]ively throughout, full of relaxed authority, and with what I really think might be the most stirring final paragraph written by an American since The Great Gatsby."

Forrest McDonald, historian and author of The American Presidency as well as Alexander Hamilton, stated that "This is a stunning achievement. Few people know the Founders well enough and contemporary issues well enough to have put together such a book, and even fewer have Brookhiser's skill at telling the story in so fascinating a way."

== See also ==
- Founding Fathers of the United States
- 2006 in literature
