= Kevin Phillips (political commentator) =

American political writer (1940–2023)

- Born: Kevin Price Phillips; November 30, 1940; New York City, New York, U.S.
- Died: October 9, 2023 (aged 82); Naples, Florida, U.S.
- Education: Colgate University (BA); Harvard University (JD)
- Spouse: Martha Henderson (m. 1968)
- Children: 3

Kevin Price Phillips (November 30, 1940 – October 9, 2023) was an American writer and commentator on politics, economics, and history. He emerged as a Republican Party strategist who helped devise its Southern Strategy in the 1960s. Phillips became disaffected with the party by the 1990s, subsequently leaving it to become an independent and staunch critic of the Republicans. He was a regular contributor to the Los Angeles Times, Harper's Magazine, and National Public Radio, and was a political analyst on PBS's NOW with Bill Moyers.

== Early life ==
Phillips was born in Manhattan in 1940, and grew up in the Bronx, raised by a family of Irish, Scottish, and English descent. He was drawn to the Republican Party from an early age, supporting Dwight D. Eisenhower for president in 1952 and 1956. He attended the Bronx High School of Science before earning a bachelor's degree in political science from Colgate University in 1961 and a juris doctor from Harvard Law School in 1964. He also studied abroad at the University of Edinburgh from 1959 to 1960.

== Early career ==
Phillips began his political career as an aide to Republican Representative Paul A. Fino. He worked as a strategist on voting patterns for Richard Nixon's 1968 campaign, which was the basis for a book, The Emerging Republican Majority, which predicted a conservative political realignment in national politics and is widely regarded as influential in the field of American political science.

=== Southern strategy ===
Phillips told a journalist during the 1968 presidential election that "the whole secret of politics is knowing who hates who". After Nixon was elected, Phillips wrote a book on what has come to be known as the "Southern strategy" of the Republican Party. Entitled The Emerging Republican Majority, it argued that the southern states of the US would keep the Republicans winning presidential elections and more than offset the decline in Republican support in Northeast states, based on the racial resentment of white voters.

As he stated to the New York Times Magazine in 1970,

All the talk about Republicans making inroads into the Negro vote is persiflage. Even 'Jake the Snake' [liberal Republican Senator Jacob Javits of New York] only gets 20 percent. From now on, Republicans are never going to get more than 10 to 20 percent of the Negro vote, and they don't need any more than that... but Republicans would be shortsighted if they weakened the Voting Rights Act. The more Negroes who register as Democrats in the South, the sooner the Negrophobe whites will quit the Democrats and become Republicans. That's where the votes are. Without that prodding from the blacks, the whites will backslide into their old comfortable arrangement with the local Democrats.

The book however was not used in the campaign itself, Phillips notes in the preface to the Princeton Edition,

Some observers concluded that The Emerging Republican Majority was the emerging Republican strategy. Newsweek labelled the book "The political bible of the Nixon Era." Not quite. The book was not a blueprint of the GOP's "Southern Strategy" as some claimed,. ... Richard Nixon had read memos based on the book's analyses during the week before the November 1968 election, but in mid-1969 he truthfully said he had not read the actual book. He read it a few months later.

His predictions regarding shifting voting patterns in presidential elections proved accurate, though they did not extend "downballot" to Congressional elections until the Republican revolution of 1994.

=== Political commentary ===
Phillips briefly worked in the Department of Justice during the Nixon administration, but later left to embark on a career as an author and commentator. In his books, he coined the term Sun Belt to refer to the southern states. During this time, he was associated with the New Right.

== Later career ==
As time went on, Phillips grew increasingly disillusioned with the Republican Party. Claiming that the Watergate scandal had dealt a fatal blow to his vision for a perpetual Republican majority, he was a critic of expanding wealth inequality under the presidency of Ronald Reagan, and was a staunch opponent of George W. Bush's administration, which he extensively criticized in his 2006 book American Theocracy.

=== American Theocracy (2006) ===
Rev. Dr. Allen Dwight Callahan states the book's theme is that the Republican Party (GOP), religious fundamentalism, petroleum, and borrowed money are an "Unholy Alliance."

The last chapter, in a nod to his first major work, is titled "The Erring Republican Majority". American Theocracy, "presents a nightmarish vision of ideological extremism, catastrophic fiscal irresponsibility, rampant greed and dangerous shortsightedness."

The New York Times wrote:

He identifies three broad and related trends — none of them new to the Bush years but all of them, he believes, exacerbated by this administration's policies — that together threaten the future of the United States and the world. One is the role of oil in defining and, as Phillips sees it, distorting American foreign and domestic policy. The second is the ominous intrusion of radical Christianity into politics and government. And the third is the astonishing levels of debt — current and prospective — that both the government and the American people have been heedlessly accumulating. If there is a single, if implicit, theme running through the three linked essays that form this book, it is the failure of leaders to look beyond their own and the country's immediate ambitions and desires so as to plan prudently for a darkening future.

Phillips uses the term financialization to describe how the U.S. economy has been radically restructured from a focus on production, manufacturing and wages, to a focus on speculation, debt, and profits. Since the 1980s, Phillips argues in American Theocracy,

the underlying Washington strategy… was less to give ordinary Americans direct sums than to create a low-interest-rate boom in real estate, thereby raising the percentage of American home ownership, ballooning the prices of homes, and allowing householders to take out some of that increase through low-cost refinancing. This triple play created new wealth to take the place of that destroyed in the 2000-2002 stock-market crash and simultaneously raised consumer confidence.

Nothing similar had ever been engineered before. Instead of a recovery orchestrated by Congress and the White House and aimed at the middle- and bottom-income segments, this one was directed by an appointed central banker, a man whose principal responsibility was to the banking system. His relief, targeted on financial assets and real estate, was principally achieved by monetary stimulus. This in itself confirmed the massive realignment of preferences and priorities within the American system….

Likewise, huge and indisputable but almost never discussed, were the powerful political economics lurking behind the stimulus: the massive rate-cut-driven post-2000 bailout of the FIRE (finance, insurance, and real estate) sector, with its ever-climbing share of GDP and proximity to power. No longer would Washington concentrate stimulus on wages or public-works employment. The Fed's policies, however shrewd, were not rooted in an abstraction of the national interest but in pursuit of its statutory mandate to protect the U.S. banking and payments system, now inseparable from the broadly defined financial services sector.

==== Critical reception ====
American Theocracy was reviewed widely. The New York Times Book Review wrote "It is not without polemic, but unlike many of the more glib and strident political commentaries of recent years, it is extensively researched and frighteningly persuasive..."

The Chicago Sun-Times wrote "Overall, Phillips' book is a thoughtful and somber jeremiad, written throughout with a graceful wryness... a capstone to his life's work."

=== Bad Money (2008) ===
Phillips examines America's great shift from manufacturing to financial services. He also discusses America's petroleum policies and the tying of the dollar to the price of oil. Phillips suggests that the Euro and the Chinese Yuan/Renminbi are favourites to take the dollar's place in countries hostile towards America, such as Iran. He then tackles the lack of regulatory oversight employed in the housing market and how the housing boom was allowed to run free under Alan Greenspan. The book concludes with the proposal that America is employing bad capitalism and extends Gresham's law of currency to suggest that their good capitalism will be driven out by the bad.

== Personal life and death ==
In 1968, Phillips married Martha Henderson. A resident of Naples, Florida, he died from complications of Alzheimer's disease at a hospice facility near his home on October 9, 2023, at the age of 82.

== Publications ==
External videos
- In Depth interview with Phillips, December 7, 2008, C-SPAN
- Booknotes interview with Phillips on The Politics of Rich and Poor, June 24, 1990, C-SPAN
- Presentation by Phillips on The Cousins' Wars, January 14, 1999, C-SPAN
- Interview with Phillips on The Cousins' Wars, February 7, 1999, C-SPAN
- Presentation by Phillips on The Cousins' Wars, May 7, 2001, C-SPAN
- Discussion with Phillips on Wealth and Democracy, September 27, 2002, C-SPAN
- Presentation by Phillips on American Dynasty, January 5, 2004, C-SPAN
- Washington Journal interview with Phillips on American Dynasty, February 13, 2004, C-SPAN
- After Words interview with Phillips on American Theocracy, March 25, 2006, C-SPAN
- Presentation by Phillips on Bad Money, May 8, 2008, C-SPAN
- Q&A interview with Phillips on 1775: A Good Year for Revolution, December 6, 2012, C-SPAN

- The Emerging Republican Majority (1969) ISBN 0691163243 ISBN 978-0691163246
- Mediacracy: American Parties and Politics in the Communications Age (1974) ISBN 0-385-04945-5
- Electoral Reform and Voter Participation (with Paul H. Blackman, 1975)
- Post-Conservative America: People, Politics, and Ideology in a Time of Crisis (1982) ISBN 0-394-52212-5
- Staying on Top: The Business Case for a National Industrial Strategy (1984) ISBN 0-394-53744-0
- The Politics of Rich and Poor: Wealth and Electorate in the Reagan Aftermath (1990) ISBN 0-394-55954-1
- Boiling Point: Democrats, Republicans, and the Decline of Middle Class Prosperity (1993) ISBN 0-679-40461-9
- Arrogant Capital: Washington, Wall Street and the Frustration of American Politics (1994) ISBN 0-316-70618-3
- The Cousins' Wars: Religion, Politics and the Triumph of Anglo-America (1999) ISBN 0-465-01369-4
- Wealth and Democracy: A Political History of the American Rich (2002) ISBN 0-767-90533-4
- William McKinley (The American Presidents Series: The 25th President, 1897-1901) (2003) ISBN 0-805-06953-4
- American Dynasty: Aristocracy, Fortune, and the Politics of Deceit in the House of Bush (2004) ISBN 0-670-03264-6
- American Theocracy: The Peril and Politics of Radical Religion, Oil, and Borrowed Money in the 21st Century (2006) ISBN 0-670-03486-X
- Bad Money: Reckless Finance, Failed Politics, and the Global Crisis of American Capitalism (2008) ISBN 978-0-670-01907-6
- After the Fall: The Inexcusable Failure of American Finance: An Update to Bad Money (2009) ASIN B0023SDQC6
- 1775: A Good Year for Revolution (2012) ISBN 978-0-670-02512-1
