= Larry Kahaner =

American journalist, author, ghostwriter and private investigator

Larry Kahaner is an American journalist, author, ghostwriter and former licensed private investigator. He was born in Brooklyn, New York and now lives in Bethesda, Maryland.

== Education ==
Kahaner holds a Master of Science in journalism from Boston University.

== Career ==
As a reporter for the Columbus (GA) Ledger-Enquirer in 1980, Kahaner wrote the first in-depth exposé of the textile mills in the city and how they caused byssinosis, also known as 'brown lung disease,' in workers. For years, workers were reluctant to complain about the illness for fear of losing their jobs, due to the mill owners exerting great economic power. Indeed, the Bibb Manufacturing Company owned an adjoining town, Bibb City. When the series was released, many of the newspaper's street boxes were looted of their copies. The series led to the Georgia legislature enacting laws to allow workers with byssinosis to file workers' compensation claims for the first time. The reportage also garnered several awards including an Associated Press Newswriting Award – Public Service.

During the early to mid 1980s, Kahaner covered the telecommunications industry as it underwent a massive change from a regulated business, dominated by AT&T, to a deregulated industry that brought in new players and new technologies. As a founding editor of Communications Daily and later as a Washington correspondent for Business Week, he wrote some of the earliest articles about the new telecommunications landscape, cell phones, email, and the internet, culminating in two books, "The Phone Book," with co-author Alan Green (Penguin, 1983) and "On the Line: The Men of MCI – Who Took on AT&T, Risked Everything and Won!" (Warner Books, 1986).

Since the 1990s, Kahaner has been a regular contributor to Fleet Owner, a transportation and logistics print magazine and online publication. He initially wrote a monthly column about Washington politics, and in 2015 began writing bimonthly articles about the lives of truck drivers. He has called attention to their day-to-day struggles, health, safety, working conditions public perceptions and personal lives.. Kahaner has also written two crime thrillers, 2016's "USA, Inc." and 2018's 'Did the Frail Have a Heater?', and has freelanced for various outlets.

== Awards and recognition ==
Kahaner has received the Jesse M. Neal National Business Journalism Award, the American Society of Business Publication Editors Regional Gold Award and an Associated Press Newswriting Award.

== Bibliography ==
- Competitive Intelligence (Simon & Schuster), ISBN 978-0684844046
- AK-47: The Weapon that Changed the Face of War (Wiley), ISBN 978-0470168806
- Values, Prosperity and the Talmud (Wiley), ISBN 978-0471444411
- Cults That Kill (Warner Books), ISBN 978-0446513753
- On The Line (Warner Books), ISBN 978-0446513135
- USA, Inc. (Bay City Publishers), ISBN 978-0-9984203-0-1
- Did the Frail Have a Heater? (Bay City Publishers), ISBN 979-8321744321
