= American Theocracy =

2005 political commentary book by Kevin Phillips

American Theocracy: The Peril and Politics of Radical Religion, Oil, and Borrowed Money in the 21st Century
- Author: Kevin Phillips
- Subject: Republican Party
- Genre: Non-fiction
- Published: 2006

American Theocracy: The Peril and Politics of Radical Religion, Oil, and Borrowed Money in the 21st Century (ISBN 0-670-03486-X) is a 2006 political commentary book by American political writer Kevin Phillips. The book is a critique of the past forty years of the Republican coalition in United States politics. He "presents a nightmarish vision of ideological extremism, catastrophic fiscal irresponsibility, rampant greed, and dangerous shortsightedness."

Phillips points to three unifying themes holding this coalition together. First, its tie to oil and the role oil plays in American and world events. Second, to the coalition of social conservatives, Evangelicals and Pentecostals in this Republican coalition. Finally, he points to the "debt culture" of this coalition, and to a coming "debt bubble" related to the debt of the U.S. Government and U.S. consumers. He argues that similar issues have been prevalent in the past, when other world powers, such as the Roman Empire and the British Empire declined from their peaks and fell into disarray.

While working as a strategist in the presidential campaign of Richard Nixon, Phillips wrote The Emerging Republican Majority. In that book, Phillips predicted the formation of this very coalition that he criticizes in his current book. In American Theocracy he admits that while these "mutations," as he calls them, could have been predicted, he did not foresee the extent to which they would develop and dominate the coalition he helped put together. The last chapter of this book references his first work and is called "The Erring Republican Majority."

== Synopsis ==
Phillips describes three central, unifying planks in the Republican coalition. The first is oil. The second is radical religion. The third is unprecedented levels of national and consumer debt.

=== Oil and American Supremacy ===
Phillips suggests that American greatness in the 20th century was built on oil, much as British greatness in the 19th century was built on coal, and Dutch greatness before that was built on wind and waterpower. When these energy sources became scarce or were replaced with a new source, argues Phillips, these countries lost their greatness to the master of the new energy source.

He points to American society and geography being built around oil, with widely dispersed suburbs and exurbs. He criticizes the "SUV gas-hog culture" and points to geological estimates that oil supplies in most of the world have peaked, in the most pessimistic of views, or will peak within the next few decades, which ranks in with the optimistic view, with the result being prices continuing to increase and oil becoming scarcer.

Phillips points to political ramifications. He cites statistics that show that people who use more oil are more likely to vote Republican. These people are more likely to drive larger domestic trucks and SUVs and live further from the urban center of a city, thus driving more in less efficient vehicles. Of the top ten oil states, eight voted for George W. Bush in the 2004 Presidential election.

Finally, Phillips suggests that oil has been the driving force in U.S. foreign policy for nearly thirty years. He suggests that the U.S. military has been transformed into a worldwide oil protection force. He suggests that various military events in the 1980s, as well as the 1991 Gulf War and the 2003 Invasion of Iraq, were primarily oil driven. Phillips makes a point that with Iraq at war for the past 25 years, and thus Iraqi oil production depressed for that time period, most of Iraq's oil is still in the ground.

=== Too Many Preachers ===
In this section, Phillips refers to the large presence in the conservative coalition of religious Evangelicals and Pentecostals. He cites a statistic that 40 percent of the Republican coalition is made up of such voters. Phillips cites quotes by U.S. President George W. Bush suggesting that he is speaking for God, and points to past leaders, such as Roman dictator Julius Caesar who made similar statements. He points to hostility by the social conservatives towards science in general, and Darwinian evolution in particular, but particularly focuses on the end-times prophecies of what he refers to as Christian Reconstructionists.

Phillips starts this section by tracing the history of American religion. He argues that the pilgrims who emigrated to the New World before the American Revolution were religious outsiders, who were non-conformist and more radical than the establishment would allow (which was why they left Europe in the first place). He points to a history of highly emotional religious practices in the 17th and 18th centuries. He then argues that after "fundamentalist religion" (particularly Evangelical and the newly formed Pentecostal branches) were set back after the Scopes Monkey Trial, they appeared to have been dealt a permanent blow. Phillips cites statistical studies that suggest that after this point, fundamentalist religion grew at a rapid rate, while mainstream denominations actually declined (this was covered to most observers at the time due to other circumstances, such as the increase in population at the time.)

Phillips argues that religion is, by far, the most accurate predictor of political and ideological belief. He cites this as the primary determinant of who picked what side during what he refers to as the three great civil wars between English speaking people: the English Civil War in the 17th century, the American Revolution, and the American Civil War.

=== Borrowed Prosperity ===
Phillips points to the unprecedented national debt, currently approaching eighteen trillion dollars. He also points to a "debt culture." He suggests underlying problems because the "debt industry" is larger than industries that actually manufacture goods (such as the automotive industry). He suggests a coming debt bubble. He predicts a liquidation of U.S. government debt by foreign creditors, and mass insolvency of consumers.

== See also ==
- The Scandal of the Evangelical Mind
