= Thieves of Baghdad =

- Author: Matthew Bogdanos
- Language: English
- Genre: Non-fiction
- Publisher: Bloomsbury (USA)
- Publication date: 2005
- Publication place: United States
- Media type: Print (Hardback)
- Pages: 320
- ISBN: 1-58234-645-3
- OCLC: 61724401
- Dewey Decimal: 956.7044/31 22
- LC Class: DS79.76 .B635 2005

Thieves of Baghdad is a non-fictional account written by Col. Matthew Bogdanos about the quest to recover over a thousand lost artifacts from the National Museum of Iraq in Baghdad after the country's counter-invasion.

== Themes ==
=== Story of tracking down stolen objects ===
Much of the book is an accounting of how his unit set up camp in the library of the Iraq museum in April 2003 and tried to recover lost artifacts. He developed relationships with museum staff, and, drawing on his knowledge of ancient civilizations, as well as his knowledge of police work, having been a criminal prosecutor in New York for many years, tells how he and the team were able to recover a huge amount of priceless antiquities which had been looted from the museum in the past days, and even years.

=== Analyze the idea that the US allowed museum looting while protecting the oil ministry ===
He goes into great detail about the theme that the US let the museum be looted while it protected the oil ministry... a version of events that was widely reported.

Bogdanos goes into great detail about why this story is not very accurate. First there are basic differences in the two sites. The oil ministry was a single building, which was bombed and had no occupants by the time US troops arrived.

The museum, on the other hand, was an 11-acre (45,000 m^{2}) compound, full of various buildings, full of Iraqi army troops, fortified with sniper and gun positions, when a small group of Americans was first sent to check it out. The only way to have 'protected' the museum at that point in time, initially, would have been to attack it, and drive out the Iraqi army .... destroying the museum in a horrific firefight. This is roughly Bogdanos' argument.

After this, there is a small window when the US failed to protect the museum, something he says was caused by planners not thinking that the museum would be looted. . . . they figured the looters would go after symbols of the Ba'ath party, like palaces.

But the US finally did get there... Bogdanos had managed to find a sympathetic person in the military brass, thanks in part to press coverage, who supported his mission, despite opposition from many people in the military, and eventually, also despite a lack of interest or caring on the part of many civilian bureaucrats, even from the UN.

=== Analyze the state of the global illegal antiquities trade ===
A great deal of the end of the book is spent discussing and analyzing the problems of stopping the illegal trade in antiquities. He talks about how the problem is not just smugglers, it goes into the dealers, the brokers, the buyers, the historians and professors who authenticate stolen antiquities for buyers, museum staffs, and even governments that look the other way, while collecting import tariffs.

Another problem is lack of support for law enforcement involvement in the problem. He points out that many governments have donated millions of dollars to the museum, but very little money has been given to the investigative work needed to track down and recover stolen antiquities that belong in the museum. Interpol, the FBI, and other agencies that could do the work have very few people assigned to the task, and those people have almost no budget to work with.

He talks about his efforts to 'bridge the gap' between law enforcement culture and academic culture, and some of his successes. He also lays out a plan for how he would reform the system... One part of his plan includes having a single binding agreement, somewhat like the ABA code, that standardizes what constitutes 'legal' provenance for antiquities, to be used amongst archaeologists, collectors, dealers, museums, academics, law enforcement, customs, etc.

=== Reviews and press ===
- "Marine Col. Matthew Bogdano’s resume would put Indiana Jones to shame." – U.S. News & World Report
- Bogdanos, Matthew (June 17, 2009). "Matthew Bogdanos". Conversations with Allan Wolper (Interview). Interviewed by Allan Wolper. WBGO.
