= Dick Bivins Stadium =

American 15,000-capacity stadium

Coordinates: 35°12′11″N 101°48′3″W

The 15,000-capacity Dick Bivins Stadium is a stadium in Amarillo, Texas, USA, located at 800 S Marrs Street on the city's east side. It is primarily used for American football, and is the home field of the Amarillo Independent School District (AISD). During the season, many Texas Panhandle area high school football teams play regular and post-season games here. These schools include the four AISD-affiliated high schools: Amarillo High, Caprock High, Tascosa High, and Palo Duro High.

The stadium is named after Dick Bivins, Amarillo civic leader and nephew of Lee Bivins. It has the distinction of being the first stadium in the world to use the next-generation artificial turf surface FieldTurf (an artificial turf that closely resembles natural grass by using sand and rubber as an infill material), which it first installed in 1998.
