= University High School (Waco, Texas) =

Location
- 3201 South New Road; Waco, Texas 76706-3793; United States; 31.50449°N 97.13648°W

Information
- School type: Public high school
- Motto: "Once a Trojan, Always a Trojan"
- Established: 1946
- School district: Waco Independent School District
- Principal: Dr. Qunisha Johnson
- Teaching staff: 113.55 (FTE)
- Grades: 9–12
- Enrollment: 1,750 (2023–2024)
- Student to teacher ratio: 15.41
- Colors: Purple & White
- Athletics conference: UIL Class AAAAA
- Mascot: Trojan/Lady Trojan
- Yearbook: The Spirit
- Website: University High School

University High School is a public high school located in the city of Waco, Texas, part of Waco Independent School District and classified as a 5A school by the University Interscholastic League. It is one of two public high schools in Waco ISD, the other being Waco High School.

Originally named Waco Technical High School when it opened on Bagby Avenue in 1946, its name was changed in 1954. In 2008, citizens voted to approve a bond issue to build a new University campus, which opened for the 2011 school year. In the fall of 2012, it absorbed the district magnet school A.J. Moore Academy as a separate unit on its campus, with a full merger between the two in the 2013 school year. The career-track academies continue to bear the A.J. Moore name within University High.

In 2015, the school was rated "Met Standard" by the Texas Education Agency.

University High School's attendance boundary includes sections of Waco and Beverly Hills.

== Athletics ==
University High competes in these sports -

Volleyball, Cross Country, Football, Basketball, Powerlifting, Soccer, Golf, Tennis, Track, Softball and Baseball.

=== State titles ===
- Boys Soccer
  - 2013(4A)

== Notable alumni ==
- Walter Abercrombie, all-time leading rusher for Baylor University, later NFL player.
- Perrish Cox, cornerback for the Seattle Seahawks
- Jerrell Freeman, NFL player (Chicago Bears)
- Mark W. Muesse, American philosopher and educator
- Jim Smith, professional baseball player
- LaDainian Tomlinson, TCU football star, NFL single-season touchdown record-holder, Pro Football Hall of Fame inductee (2017).
- Juliana Yendork, attended as a freshman. Olympic Long Jumper, later National High School Record holder in the Triple Jump after moving to Walnut High School in California
- Kenrich Williams, basketball player for the Oklahoma City Thunder.
