= Howard Lynch =

American football coach (1902–1989)

Biographical details
- Born: March 2, 1902; Hamilton, Texas, US
- Died: December 10, 1989 (aged 87)

Coaching career (HC unless noted)
- 1933–1936: Franklin HS (KY)
- 1937–1950: Amarillo HS (TX)

Head coaching record
- Overall: 150–41–2

Accomplishments and honors

Championships
- 4A Texas state (1940)

Howard W. "Bull" Lynch (March 2, 1902 – December 10, 1989) was an American football coach.

Lynch was born in Hamilton, Texas, but soon moved to Amarillo. He graduated from Amarillo High School and went on to Centre College in Danville, Kentucky, and the University of Kentucky, where he earned a master's degree in 1933. His first head coaching job was at a high school in Franklin, Kentucky, where his teams were 24–12–1.

In 1937, Lynch succeeded Blair Cherry as Amarillo head football coach. Cherry went on to become offensive coordinator at the University of Texas, and left an Amarillo Sandies football program he had turned into a dynasty by winning three consecutive 4A state championships (1934–1936). Lynch was not as successful, though achieving a state title in 1940, a state finals appearance in 1948 (losing 21–0 to Waco High School), a state semifinal appearance, a playoff berth seven times in the 1940s and an average of 10 wins a season as head coach. His overall record at Amarillo was 126–29–1.

In 1951, after a 4–6 season, his contract as head coach was not renewed. However, Lynch remained at Amarillo High. He began to focus on school administration, land in March 1951, he became an assistant principal at Amarillo High, remaining in that position until Tascosa opened in the fall of 1958. He was the first principal at Tascosa and remained in that job until he retired in 1967. After spending 37 years in the Amarillo school system, Lynch was an assistant vice president for Tascosa National Bank for 10 years.
