= Hickland =

Hickland is a surname. Notable people with the surname include:

- Catherine Hickland (born 1956), American actress
- Hillary Hickland, American politician
