= Joe Kerbel =

American football coach

Biographical details
- Born: May 3, 1921; Dallas, Texas, U.S.
- Died: March 20, 1973 (aged 51); Arlington, Texas, U.S.

Coaching career (HC unless noted)
- 1947–?: Bartlesville (OK)
- ?–1951: Cleveland HS (OK)
- 1952–1954: Breckenridge HS (TX)
- 1955–1957: Amarillo HS (TX)
- 1958–1959: Texas Tech (assistant)
- 1960–1970: West Texas State

Administrative career (AD unless noted)
- 1969–1971: West Texas State

Head coaching record
- Overall: 68–42–1 (college)
- Bowls: 2–0

Joseph Edward Kerbel (May 3, 1921 – March 20, 1973) was an American football coach and college athletics administrator. He is the second winningest coach in West Texas A&M Buffaloes history.

After a successful coaching career at Bartlesville and Cleveland High School in Oklahoma, Kerbel became head coach at Breckenridge High School in 1952. Breckenridge had won its first 3A state title in 1951 under coach Cooper Robbins who had just left for Texas A&M, raising the expectations high for Kerbel. He did not disappoint, as he won two additional state championships in 1952 and 1954. He then left for Texas football powerhouse Amarillo High School, which had won four state championships under coaches Blair Cherry and Howard Lynch.

After coaching at Amarillo High School for three seasons, Kerbel became an assistant under DeWitt Weaver at Texas Tech University in 1957. He then took over a West Texas A&M football program in 1960 that had won just two games in two years under head coach Clark Jarnagin. Kerbel turned the program around, amassing a 68–42–1 record the next 11 years and winning two bowl games, the 1962 Sun Bowl and 1967 Junior Rose Bowl, along the way. Notable players for Kerbel included Stan Hansen, Mercury Morris, Duane Thomas, Jerry Don Logan, and Thomas Krempasky, three-time All Texas defensive back. Kerbel retired in 1971 after the school chose not to renew his contract. He was succeeded by Gene Mayfield.

Kerbel was born in Dallas and raised in Seminole, Oklahoma. He died of a heart attack, on March 20, 1973, at Arlington Memorial Hospital in Arlington, Texas.

== Head coaching record ==
=== College ===
| Year | Team | Overall | Conference | Standing | Bowl/playoffs |
|---|---|---|---|---|---|
West Texas State Buffaloes (Border Conference) (1960–1961)
| 1960 | West Texas State | 3–7 | 1–4 | 5th | |
| 1961 | West Texas State | 6–4 | 3–1 | 2nd | |
West Texas State Buffaloes (NCAA University Division independent) (1962–1970)
| 1962 | West Texas State | 9–2 | | | W Sun |
| 1963 | West Texas State | 4–4–1 | | | |
| 1964 | West Texas State | 4–6 | | | |
| 1965 | West Texas State | 6–4 | | | |
| 1966 | West Texas State | 7–3 | | | |
| 1967 | West Texas State | 8–3 | | | W Junior Rose |
| 1968 | West Texas State | 8–2 | | | |
| 1969 | West Texas State | 6–4 | | | |
| 1970 | West Texas State | 7–3 | | | |
| West Texas State: | | 68–42–1 | 4–6 | | |
| Total: | | 68–42–1 | | | |
