= Amelia Rabroker =

American politician

Member-elect of the Texas House of Representatives from the 55th district
- Assuming office January 2027
- Succeeding: Hillary Hickland

Personal details
- Party: Democratic

Amelia Rabroker is an American politician. A member of the Democratic Party, she is the member-elect for the 55th district of the Texas House of Representatives.
