= Hugh Shine =

American Army Colonel, financial advisor, and politician

Member of the Texas House of Representatives from the 55th district
- In office January 10, 2017 – January 14, 2025
- Preceded by: Molly White
- Succeeded by: Hillary Hickland

Member of the Texas House of Representatives from the 53rd district
- In office November 14, 1986 – January 8, 1991
- Preceded by: Bill Messer
- Succeeded by: Dianne White Delisi

Personal details
- Born: Hugh Dunham Shine; July 27, 1952 (age 74) Harris County, Texas, U.S.
- Party: Republican
- Education: Sam Houston State University (BA); United States Army War College (MA); Baylor University (MBA)
- Occupation: Military officer Financial advisor
- Website: shineforstaterep.com

Hugh Dunham Shine (born July 27, 1952) is a retired United States Army Colonel, financial advisor, and politician. He was a former Republican member of the Texas House of Representatives, representing the 55th District. Shine defeated incumbent Molly White in the 2016 Republican primary and went on to win the November 2016 general election. He previously served two terms in the Texas House of Representatives from 1986 to 1990 before vacating his seat to run unsuccessfully for the United States House of Representatives. He lost renomination to the State House in 2024.

== Early life ==
Shine was born July 27, 1952, in the city of Houston in Harris County, Texas.

== Career as a financial advisor ==
In 1983, shortly after separating from active duty and while a member of the National Guard, Shine began a civilian career as a financial advisor in Bell County, Texas, in the city of Temple. Shine completed an M.B.A. from Baylor University and later an investment associate certificate through the executive education program of the Wharton School of Business at the University of Pennsylvania.
