= Tung Jeong =

American international leader in the field of holography

- Tung Jeong at Lake Forest College, circa 1968
- Born: December 19, 1931; Hoiping, China
- Died: May 4, 2015 (aged 83); Tallahassee, Florida
- Citizenship: American
- Education: Yale University
- Known for: Holography
- Scientific career
- Fields: Physics

Tung Hon Jeong (December 19, 1931 – May 4, 2015) was an international leader in the field of holography. He worked with Hans Bjelkhagen on technology to make true-color holograms and assisted in the development of the three-dimensional moving holograms. His research led to simple and economical holograms.

== Early life ==
Jeong was born in December 1931 in Hoiping (now known as Kaiping), China, Jeong birthday and biological parents were unknown to him as he was sold to a land owner sometime around the 1931 China floods. Later Jeong and his mother would flee to Hong Kong to avoid an invading Japanese army. Jeong would have to flee from Hong Kong to Macao and later from Macao back to his village in Hoiping to avoid bombings in both areas caused by World War II. After World War II Jeong would again have to flee from China, this time from the Chinese Communist Party who were after land owners like him and his family.

== Education ==
After fleeing from China in 1948, Jeong eventually emigrated to Amarillo, Texas where he showed an inborn talent for mathematics and physics. Still only a young boy, one of his grade school teachers saw promise in him and decided to teach him English. Later in life Jeong would graduate from Amarillo High School as the second highest in his graduating class, and receive a full scholarship to Yale University. By 1962 Jeong would continue his education by earning his PhD in nuclear physics at the University of Minnesota; he would also meet his lifelong wife Anna in that same school.

== Career ==
Shortly after getting his PhD in nuclear physics, Jeong would join the field of holography and would quickly become a recognized leader in the field. Jeong would produce several articles and scientific journals one of which being published in Applied Optics (the most widely read holography journal); Jeong would also produce two motion pictures one entitled "Introduction to Holography" which was sponsored by Encyclopædia Britannica. Jeong would be invited to lecture at over 500 universities and industrial sites all across the world, co-chair international conferences on holography, host holography workshops, and start the International Symposium on Display Holography. Jeong has also acted as a consultant to corporations in various industries on how to use and apply holography, one of these corporations being DuPont which he worked with during their development of holographic photopolymers. In addition Jeong has chaired for the Practical Holography - Materials and Applications conference, Co-chaired at the International Symposium on Display Holography, and received the Robert A. Millikan award, Saxby Medal (of the Royal Photographic Society of Great Britain), and the Lifetime Achievement Award from the International Holographic Manufacturer's Association. Additionally, Jeong was a professor at Lake Forest College.

== Holography ==
While working with Hans Bjelkhagen, Jeong invented the technology that made true-color holograms possible. Jeong is also credited with the invention of cylindrical holograms, which was a major advancement in holography allowing the creation of images people could walk around and view from all perspectives. Jeong would later help in the invention and development of the technology used to create three-dimensional moving holograms and is credited with being the first to use optic fibers in his holograms, making them simpler and more cost effective.

== Death ==
On 4 May 2015, Jeong died in Tallahassee, Florida, after a long battle with prostate cancer, and was survived by his wife of 53 years Anna, sons Allan and Alec, daughter Alicia, and two grandchildren
