= Richfield High School (Waco) =

Former high school in Waco, Texas, USA

Richfield High School was a school formerly located in Waco, Texas. The school began construction in 1960 and opened in September 1961. It was situated on the site of a World War I army airfield, Rich Field.

In 1986, Richfield was consolidated with two other high schools in Waco ISD — Waco High School and Jefferson-Moore High School. This merged school, the current Waco High School, is housed in the former Richfield building on N. 42nd Street in Waco.

The Richfield school mascot was the Ram and school colors were scarlet (red) and gray.

The most celebrated athletic success at Richfield was back-to-back Texas state girls' basketball championships in 1984 and 1985. The Richfield Ramblers (changed from Rams) completed both seasons with undefeated records and had a combined record of 66–0, one of the greatest accomplishments in Texas high school basketball history.

== Notable alumni ==
- Lyndon Lowell Olson, Jr, former U.S. ambassador to Sweden, (class of 1965)
- Todd Haney, professional baseball player
- Priscilla Richman Owen, Class of 1972, federal court judge
- Kevin Reynolds (class of 1970), movie director
- Ralph Sheffield (class of 1973), Republican member of the Texas House of Representatives from Bell County
- Tim Spehr, professional baseball player
- Alfred Anderson, Professional Football Player
- Pat Zachry (class of 1970), professional baseball player
- John McClain (class of 1971), sportswriter
