= Amarillo High School =

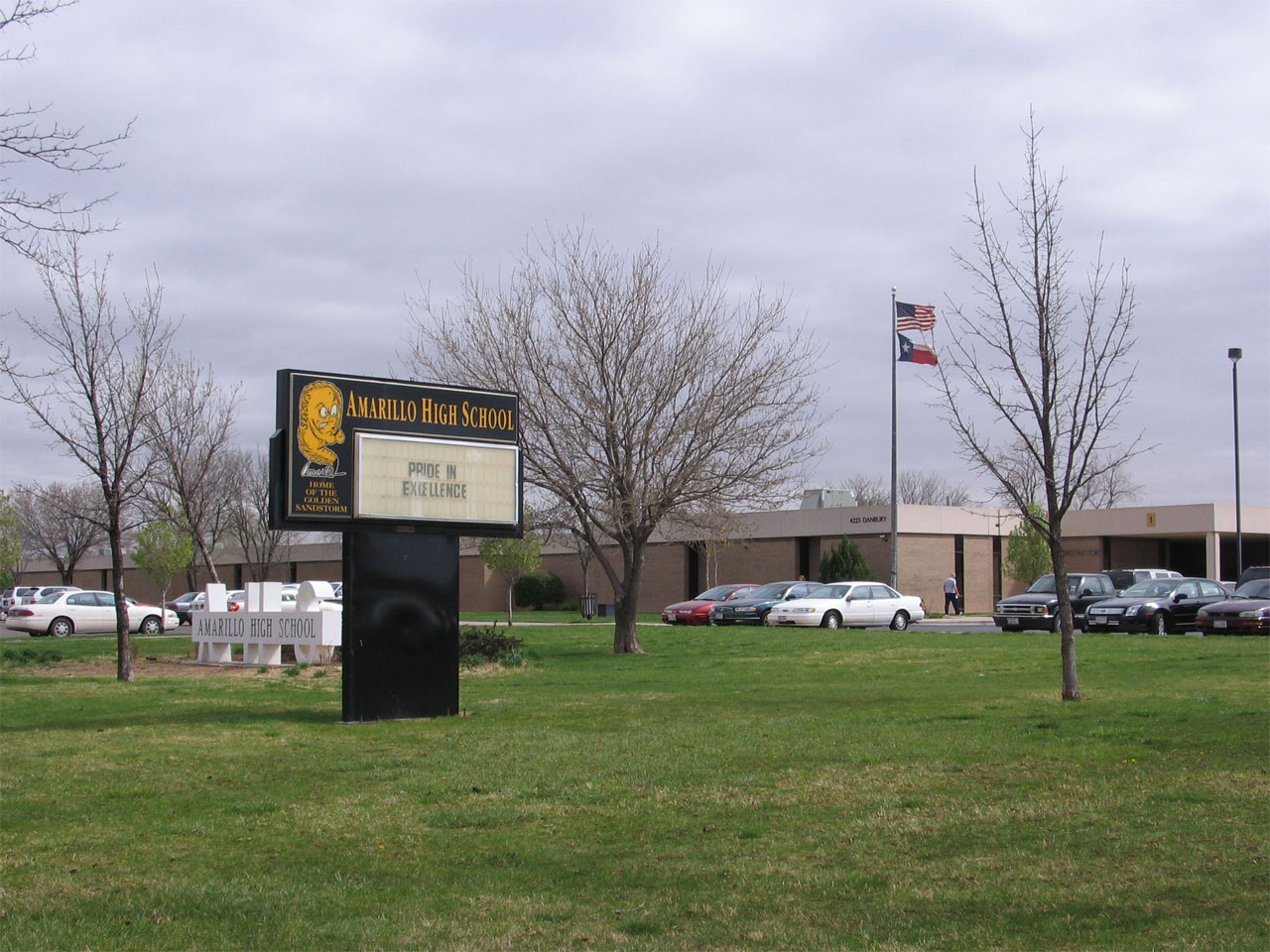
- Amarillo High School

Location
- 4225 Danbury St. Amarillo, TX 79109-5199; United States; 35°9′59.82″N 101°54′18.40″W

Information
- Type: Public
- Motto: Scholarship, Sportsmanship, Service
- Established: 1889
- School district: Amarillo Independent School District
- Principal: Andrea Pfeifer
- Staff: 129.80 (FTE)
- Grades: 9-12
- Enrollment: 2,170 (2023-2024)
- Student to teacher ratio: 16.72
- Colors: Black & gold
- Athletics: UIL Class 5A
- Athletics conference: University Interscholastic League
- Team name: Sandies/Lady Sandies
- Newspaper: The Sandstorm
- Yearbook: La Airosa
- Website: https://amaisd.org/ahs

Amarillo High School is a school located in the city of Amarillo, Texas, United States. It is one of four high schools in the Amarillo Independent School District, and is classified as a 5A school by the University Interscholastic League (UIL). In 2015, the school was rated "Met Standard" by the Texas Education Agency.

== History ==
Founded in 1889, Amarillo High School began in a converted courthouse which was outgrown and abandoned that same year. Moving to a larger building on Polk street served the school's needs until 1906. Yet another building was utilized until 1910.

Construction of a permanent home was completed in 1910, also on Polk street near downtown. A much larger facility was completed nearby in 1922. This facility was in use until a fire destroyed the entire school except for the gym in 1970.

Early in the morning of March 1, 1970, a Sunday, J.B. Putney, a custodian at First Baptist Church, traveled to work and saw the fire inside the school. He was the first person to report the blaze at 6:15 a.m. A fire raged through the building. It first began in a second story storeroom, caused by an overheated boiler below, and soon spread to damage nearly all of the structure and destroy most of the property inside. Several students arrived on the scene first and began removing textbooks, trophies, class gifts, art pieces and other artifacts from the burning building. No one was injured in the fire. The damage was estimated at the time to be nearly $2 million.

The approximately 1,700 Amarillo High School students spent the remainder of the year in makeshift classes set up in the facilities of the First Baptist Church, the Polk Street Methodist Church, and the undamaged school gymnasiums and armory. Renovations in the burned-out building accommodated students for the next three years until a new high school could be built.

In September 1973, the new Amarillo High School opened its doors at 4225 Danbury.

== Feeder schools ==
=== Middle schools ===
- Bonham Middle School
- Crockett Middle School

=== Elementary schools ===
- Belmar Elementary School
- Puckett Elementary School
- Ridgecrest Elementary School
- Sleepy Hollow Elementary School
- South Georgia Elementary School
- Western Plateau Elementary School
- Windsor Elementary School

== Extracurricular activities ==
=== Music ===
The first swing band at AHS was called the "Dukes of Sandieland". It was formed in 1958 under the direction of William O. Latson. One of the musical groups of AHS during the 1950s was the "Sandie Swingsters", which played at pep rallies, dances and other special events at AHS. Currently, the AHS Band performs at pep rallies, games, and other events.

Since then, the school has supported three string orchestras, two wind bands, a marching ensemble, and a combined orchestra.

=== Clubs ===
The school offers many activities, in foreign languages, fine arts, community services, and athletics, including drama club, student council, Spanish club, Latin club, French club, band, orchestra, choir, key club, Ken club, Junior Statesmen of America, National Honor Society, FCCLA, math club, science bowl, international forum, soccer, football, baseball, swimming, bowling, golf, wrestling, Frisbee club, and shirt club.

=== Athletics ===
Beginning in 1922, Amarillo High has made 46 football playoff appearances (as of 2007), which is second only to 5A Dallas Highland Park. Amarillo High emerged as a football powerhouse in the 1930s as young head coach Blair Cherry guided the Sandies to three consecutive Texas state championships in 1934–1936, as only the second school to ever do so (the Paul Tyson-guided Waco won 1925–27). Cherry left Amarillo in 1937 to become offensive coordinator under Dana X. Bible at the University of Texas. His successor, Howard Lynch, struggled to fulfill the high expectations, although he won another state championship in 1940 and reached the championship game in 1948. The school chose not to renew Lynch's contract in 1951.

Lynch's successor, Bill Defee, had previously coached at Panola College. Defee left in 1955, and was replaced by Joe Kerbel, who previously won two state championships at Breckenridge High. In three years, Kerbel guided the Sandies to the playoffs twice. The 1957 team was ranked #1 in the state all year long until they lost in the quarterfinals to defending state champion Abilene High School. That game drew over 22,000 fans, the largest to watch a football game in Amarillo Stadium (now Dick Bivins Stadium), as of 2007. Kerbel left to become an assistant coach at Texas Tech and later was the head coach at West Texas State University.

After that, there was a string of unsuccessful stints by a number of coaches. Amarillo High went 16 years, 1960–1975, without gaining the playoffs. Bum Phillips, who later become head couch of the Houston Oilers, coached Amarillo at the beginning of that drought from 1959 to 1961. In 1975, Larry Dippel arrived, turning the program around and guiding the Sandies to 222 wins until 2005. Dippel took over a struggling program which had not reached the playoffs since 1959, but turned the program around and led AHS to 23 playoff appearances. He retired after the 2005 season (31 seasons), finishing his career with a record of 253-134-6, with 222 wins coming with the Sandies. His many honors include being named 2003 National Coach of the Year, serving as president of the Texas High School Coaches Association in 1999 and being named State Coach of the Year (the Tom Landry Award) in 1993. Dippel also earned the Sportsmanship Award from Amarillo Football Officials four times. Dippel's tenure as a head coach at Amarillo High is the longest of any head coach in any sport in AISD history. He won 16 district titles at Hereford and AHS combined, and led the Sandies to the Class 5A state semifinals in 1992. Dippel left having coached fathers and sons, uncles and nephews.

Amarillo ISD athletic director Tex Nolan selected Brad Thiessen to be Dippel's successor. Thiessen had previously coached at 1A Stratford High and 3A Levelland High. He guided Stratford to a 16–0 season and the 1A state championship in 2000. The Stratford 2001 football team ran their unbeaten string to 30 games before losing in the semi-finals, ending a 17–1 season.

The Amarillo Sandies compete in the following sports:

- Volleyball
- Cross country
- Football
- Basketball
- Wrestling
- Swimming
- Soccer
- Golf
- Tennis
- Track
- Baseball
- Softball

=== State titles ===
- Boys basketball:
  - 1986 (5A)
- Girls' basketball:
  - 1993 (5A), 1994 (5A), 2018 (5A), 2019 (5A)
- Girls' cross country:
  - 1976 (1A), 1977 (1A), 1998 (5A)
- Football:
  - 1934 (all), 1935 (all), 1936 (all), 1940 (all)
- Boys' golf:
  - 1954 (2A)
- Volleyball:
  - 1988 (5A), 1994 (5A), 1998 (5A), 2001 (5A), 2006 (5A), 2007 (5A), 2008 (5A), 2009 (5A), 2013 (4A), 2016 (5A)

==== State finalists ====
- Football:
  - 1930 (all), 1948 (2A)
- Volleyball:
  - 1986 (5A), 1997 (5A)
- Tennis (team):
  - 2017 (5A)

=== Hell Week ===
Hell Week, also referred to as "Spirit Week", is when Amarillo High plays its annual football game against Tascosa High School, its traditional rival. During Hell Week, vandalism is commonplace, such as egging, spraypainting, toilet papering, keying, and other property-defacing acts. In 2006, vandalism ranged from simple chalking on sidewalks to bricks being thrown through windows. In 2007, Senior Sandies of '08 spray-painted the black "T" in front of Tascosa gold. Steps are being taken to attempt to make Hell Week less violent, such as increased police presence. Both schools discourage violence during announcements.

Amarillo High School has won many of the games, including the district championship in 2010, but they had a notable loss in 2009, losing by a field goal. Amarillo continued their tradition of winning until the 2016 matching, when Tascosa posted a 23–21 win over Amarillo High with a late 4th quarter touchdown with only 36 seconds left on the clock. Since 1975, Amarillo High holds the series record 32-10-2.

Year	Winner (score)
2004	Tascosa (27–23)
2005	Amarillo (15–14)
2006	Amarillo (17–16)
2007	Amarillo (27–23)
2008	Amarillo (40–27)
2009	Tascosa (24–21)
2010	Amarillo (17–3)
2011	Amarillo (34–3)
2012	Amarillo (48–0)
2013	Amarillo (40–14)
2014	Amarillo (28–14)
2015	Amarillo (14–7)
2016	Tascosa (23–21)
2017	Tascosa (27–20)
2018	Amarillo (28–21)
2019	Amarillo (36–33)
2020	Tascosa (28–27)
2021	Tascosa (34–22)
2022	Tascosa (45–10)
2023	Amarillo (42–6)
2024	Tascosa (34–29)
2025	Amarillo (63–21)

== Notable alumni ==
- Ron Ely, actor Tarzan television show and former Miss America host
- Lt. General Howard D. Graves, superintendent of the United States Military Academy (1991–1996), and chancellor of the Texas A&M University System (1999–2003)
- Heath Herring, football player and wrestler; retired mixed martial artist fighter for the Ultimate Fighting Championship
- Rick Husband, NASA astronaut, pilot of STS 96, and commander of STS 107
- Tung Jeong, physicist
- Carolyn Jones, actress on The Addams Family
- Steven Koecher, Utah man missing since 2009
- Stan Mauldin, former player for the Chicago Cardinals
- Trina Nishimura, voice actress
- Morris Overstreet, judge
- Ryan Palmer, professional PGA golf player
- T. Boone Pickens, Jr., billionaire and oil tycoon
- Eddie Reeves, singer/songwriter
- Mary Lou Robinson, US federal judge
- Ben Sargent, editorial cartoonist
- Ken Vinyard, former player for the Atlanta Falcons
- Don Williams, former player for the Pittsburgh Steelers
