= Michael Cobbins =

American basketball player (born 1992)

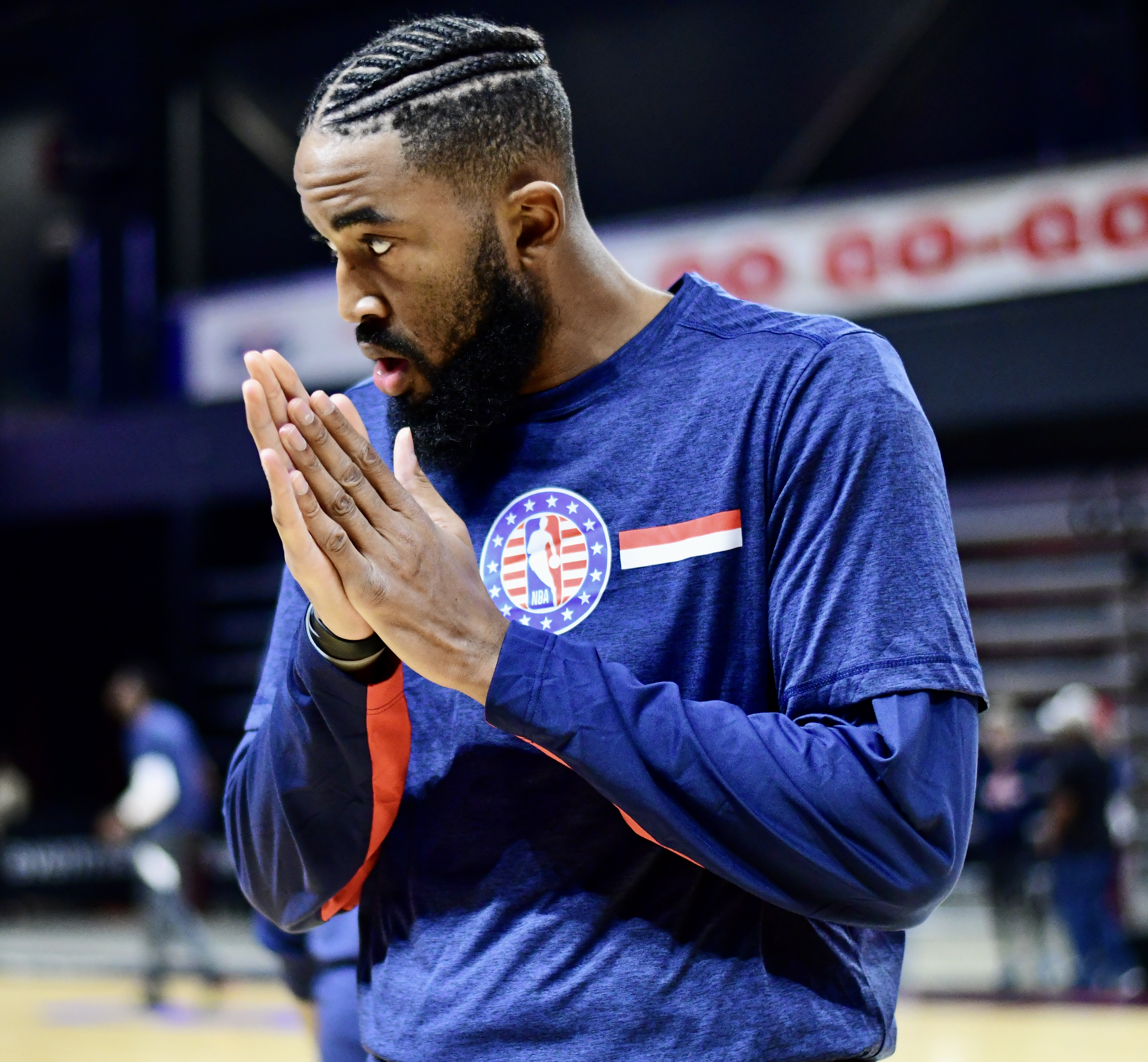
- Cobbins in November 2019

Free Agent
- Position: Power forward / center

Personal information
- Born: August 9, 1992 (age 34) Amarillo, Texas, U.S.
- Listed height: 2.03 m (6 ft 8 in)
- Listed weight: 104 kg (229 lb)

Career information
- High school: Palo Duro (Amarillo, Texas)
- College: Oklahoma State (2011–2015)
- NBA draft: 2015: undrafted
- Playing career: 2015–present

Career history
- 2015–2016: Oklahoma City Blue
- 2016–2017: Apollon Patras
- 2017: s.Oliver Würzburg
- 2017–2018: Oklahoma City Blue
- 2018–2019: Split
- 2019–2020: Capital City Go-Go
- 2021: Maccabi Haifa
- 2021–2024: Brescia Leonessa

Career highlights
- 2× Big 12 All-Defensive Team (2013, 2015)
- Stats at Basketball Reference

Michael Cobbins (born August 9, 1992) is an American professional basketball player who last played for Basket Brescia Leonessa of the Italian Lega Basket Serie A (LBA). He played college basketball for Oklahoma State.

== High school career ==
Cobbins attended Palo Duro High School where, as a junior, he averaged 18.3 points and 10.5 rebounds per game, leading the Dons to the Region I-4A finals. In his senior season, he averaged 15.1 points and 9.7 rebounds per game, making him a consensus four-star recruit. He was ranked as the 12th-best power forward by Scout.com and the ninth-best power forward by Rivals.com, who also ranked him as the No. 38 player of the nation.

== College career ==
After graduating Palo Duro, Cobbins attended Oklahoma State where he appeared in 105 games and averaged 5.8 points, 5.6 rebounds and 1.6 blocks in 25.4 minutes per game. He averaged 6.8 points, 5.9 rebounds and 1.8 blocks in his senior year. A two-time member of the Big 12 All-Defensive Team, Cobbins ranked second in the conference in blocks per game (1.83) during his senior season.

== Professional career ==
After going undrafted in the 2015 NBA draft, Cobbins joined the Oklahoma City Thunder for the 2015 NBA Summer League. On October 22, 2015, he signed with the Thunder, but was waived two days later. On November 3, he was acquired by the Oklahoma City Blue as an affiliate player from the Thunder.

On July 19, 2016, Cobbins signed with the Greek club Apollon Patras.

On August 22, 2018, Cobbins was selected by the Capital City Go-Go of the G League in the 2018 expansion draft.

On September 11, 2018, he signed with Split.

For the 2019–20 season, Cobbins signed with the Capital City Go-Go of the NBA G League. He missed a game in December 2019 with an arm injury. Cobbins missed another game against the Westchester Knicks in January 2020 with an illness. On February 22, 2020, Cobbins contributed 16 points, eight rebounds and an assist in a win over the Greensboro Swarm.

In 2021 he played for Maccabi Haifa of the Israeli Basketball Premier League. While on July 26, 2021, he signed in Italy for Basket Brescia Leonessa.

=== The Basketball Tournament ===
Cobbins joined Stillwater Stars, composed of Oklahoma State alumni, in The Basketball Tournament 2020.

== Personal life ==
The son of Dennis and Joy, Cobbins has two sisters, Kim and Jade. He graduated from Oklahoma State with a degree in university studies with an emphasis in entrepreneurship in May 2014.
