= Thomas E. Creek =

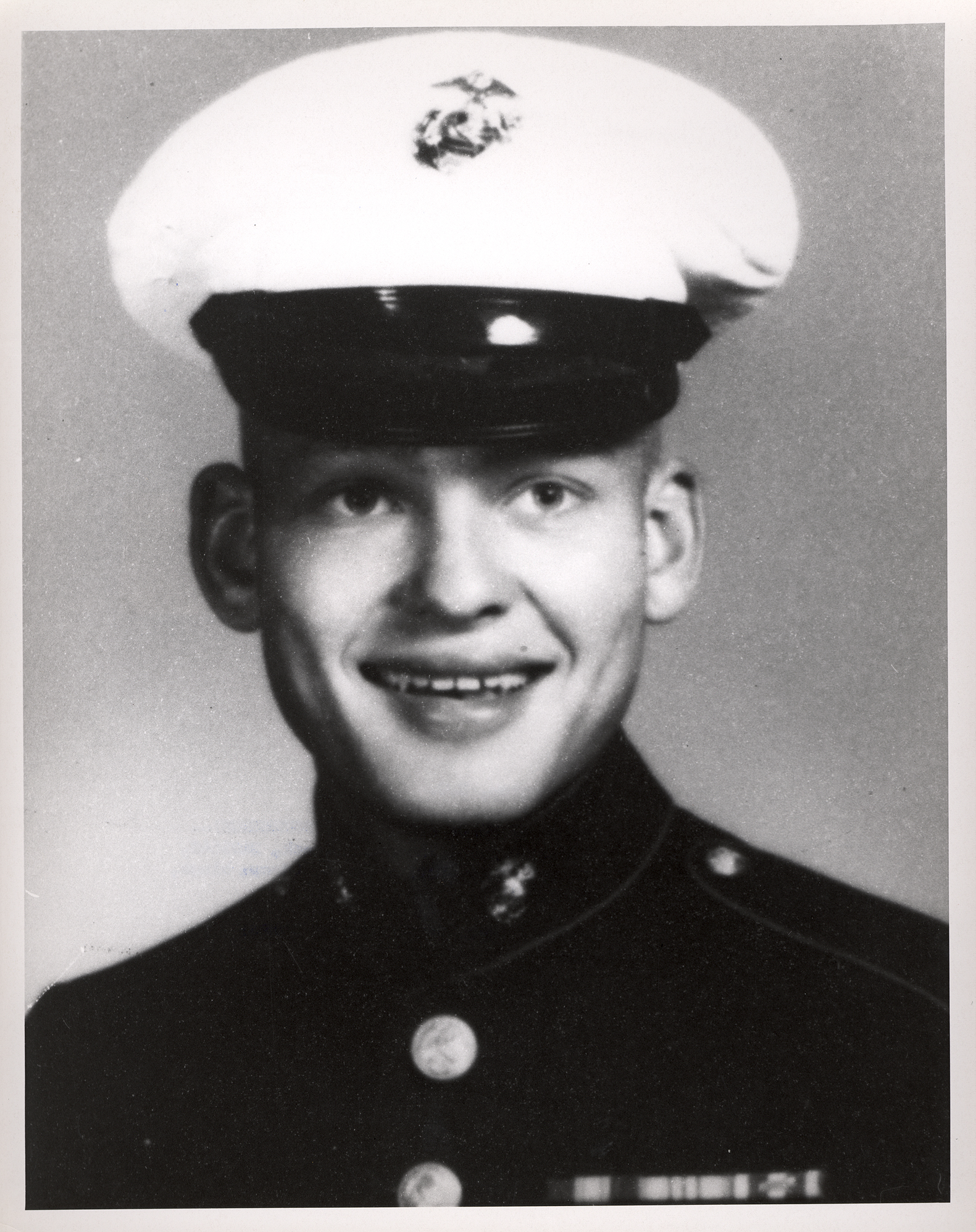
- Thomas E. Creek, Medal of Honor recipient
- Born: April 7, 1950; Joplin, Missouri, U.S.
- Died: February 13, 1969 (aged 18); Cam Lo District, Quang Tri Province, South Vietnam
- Burial place: Llano City Cemetery, Amarillo, Texas, U.S.
- Military career
- Allegiance: United States of America
- Branch: United States Marine Corps
- Service years: 1968–1969
- Rank: Lance Corporal
- Units: Company I, 3rd Battalion, 9th Marines, 3rd Marine Division
- Conflicts: Vietnam War †
- Awards: Medal of Honor; Purple Heart

Thomas Elbert Creek (April 7, 1950 – February 13, 1969) was a United States Marine who posthumously received the Medal of Honor for heroism during February 1969 in Vietnam.

During an ambush at Cam Lo District in Quang Tri Province, Creek was wounded and fell into a gully with several other Marines inside. When an enemy grenade was thrown inside, Creek threw himself onto the grenade and was killed instantly. His action saved the lives of his fellow Marines, and Creek was posthumously awarded the Medal of Honor in 1970 for his heroic action.

== Biography ==
Thomas Creek was born on April 7, 1950, in Joplin, Missouri. He grew up in Amarillo, Texas, where he attended Forest Hill Elementary School, Horace Mann Jr. High School, and Palo Duro High School.

Creek enlisted in the United States Marine Corps on January 16, 1968. He completed recruit training with the 1st Recruit Training Battalion, Marine Corps Recruit Depot San Diego, California, in March 1968. Creek received individual combat training with Company A, 1st Battalion, 2d Infantry Training Regiment, at Camp Pendleton, California, in April, and basic infantry training with Rifle Training Company, Basic Infantry Training Battalion, 2nd Infantry Training Regiment at Camp Pendleton, in May 1968. Creek was promoted to private first class on June 1, 1968.

In July 1968, Creek was deployed to the Republic of Vietnam. He first saw duty as a rifleman with Company E, 2nd Battalion, 27th Marines, 1st Marine Division. In September 1968, Creek was assigned duty as fire team leader with Company I, 3rd Battalion 9th Marines, 3rd Marine Division and was promoted to lance corporal on November 1, 1968.

While serving as fire team leader, Creek was killed in action on February 13, 1969, near the Cam Lo resettlement village. Creek's squad was escorting a convoy of trucks bringing supplies to Vandegrift Combat Base when it was ambushed. While under enemy mortar fire, Creek moved to a position to attack the hidden enemy, engaging in a fire fight. While moving to a better position, he was shot in the neck and fell into a gully near fellow Marines who had taken cover. A grenade then landed between Creek and the other Marines. Creek rolled on top of the grenade and took the full force of the blast, saving the lives of those around him. His men continued the fight and defeated the enemy force, allowing the convoy being able to continue.

Creek was posthumously awarded the Medal of Honor — which was presented to his family by Vice President Spiro Agnew on April 20, 1970, at the White House. Creek is buried in the Llano City Cemetery in Amarillo.

== Awards and honors ==
Creek's medals include:

Medal of Honor	Purple Heart	Combat Action Ribbon
National Defense Service Medal	Vietnam Service Medal w/ 2 service stars	Vietnam Campaign Medal

- In 2005, the U.S. Department of Veterans Affairs Medical Center, Amarillo, Texas was renamed as the Thomas E. Creek Department of Veterans Affairs Medical Center.
- Creek's name is inscribed on the Vietnam Veterans Memorial on Panel 32W, Line 025.

=== Medal of Honor citation ===
The President of the United States in the name of The Congress takes pride in presenting the MEDAL OF HONOR posthumously to

LANCE CORPORAL THOMAS E. CREEK
UNITED STATES MARINE CORPS

for service as set forth in the following CITATION:

For conspicuous gallantry and intrepidity at the risk of his life above and beyond the call of duty while serving as a Rifleman with Company I, Third Battalion, Ninth Marines, Third Marine Division in action against enemy forces in the Republic of Vietnam. On February 13, 1969, Lance Corporal Creek's squad was providing security for a convoy moving to resupply the Vandegrift Combat Base when an enemy command detonated mine destroyed one of the vehicles and halted the convoy near the Cam Lo Resettlement Village. Almost immediately, the Marines came under a heavy volume of hostile mortar fire followed by intense small arms fire from a well-concealed North Vietnamese Army force. When his squad rapidly deployed to engage the enemy, Lance Corporal Creek quickly moved to a fighting position and aggressively engaged in the fire fight. Observing a position from which he could more effectively deliver fire against the hostile force, he completely disregarded his own safety as he fearlessly dashed across the fire-swept terrain and was seriously wounded by enemy fire. At the same time, a North Vietnamese fragmentation grenade was thrown into the gully where he had fallen, landing between him and several companions. Fully realizing the inevitable results of his action, Lance Corporal Creek valiantly rolled on the grenade and absorbed the full force of the explosion with his own body, thereby saving the lives of five of his fellow Marines. As a result of his heroic action, his men were inspired to such aggressive action that the North Vietnamese were defeated and the convoy was able to continue its vital mission. Lance Corporal Creek's indomitable courage, inspiring valor and selfless devotion to duty upheld the highest traditions of the Marine Corps and the United States Naval Service. He gallantly gave his life for his country.

/S/ RICHARD M. NIXON

== See also ==
- List of Medal of Honor recipients
- List of Medal of Honor recipients for the Vietnam War
