= Melinda Bordelon =

American painter, illustrator and photographer (1949–1995)

- Born: Melinda Jane Bordelon; 6 March 1949
- Died: 18 November 1995 (aged 46)
- Education: Texas Christian University
- Known for: Illustration, painting

Melinda Jane Bordelon (March 6, 1949 – November 18, 1995) was an American painter and illustrator whose professional work adorns magazine covers, articles, and advertisements—as well as album covers, book covers, and video game packaging—produced from the early 1970s through the 1990s. Her principal art media were acrylic paint and ink.

== Early life and education ==
Melinda Jane Bordelon was the daughter of Dr. Howard M. Bordelon (a urologist) and Mary Jane Peters Bordelon, of Amarillo, Texas. Interested in art from an early age, she was a third-prize winner in a newspaper coloring contest when she was 12 years old. She attended Tascosa High School before enrolling at Texas Christian University in Fort Worth, where she studied illustration under Don Ivan Punchatz.

== Career ==
Shortly after Bordelon relocated from Texas to Cornwall, New York in the early 1970s, the weekly magazine New York commissioned her to contribute a painting to a collection illustrating dramatic scenes from the Watergate scandal. She was one of the few artists selected who had never worked with the magazine before. Within a year, through her work for various magazines, Bordelon became a highly sought-after illustrator in American media.

Among her magazine cover illustrations were the June 1974 issue of National Lampoon, the October 1976 issue of Sesame Street Magazine, and the October 1982 issue of Harper's Magazine. Her extensive magazine credits also included article illustrations for Esquire, National Lampoon, Oui, and Playboy.

The Society of Illustrators recognized Bordelon for her illustration work on three occasions between 1974 and 1977. The Society first awarded her for the cover of the 1974 Brownsville Station album School Punks, which she illustrated by commission of Atlantic Records. In the spring of 1975, the Society exhibited this album art, among others, at Illustrators XVII, the 17th such exhibition at their contemporary art gallery in New York. In addition, they subsequently exhibited her work at Illustrators XVIII (1976) and Illustrators XIX (1977).

In the mid-1990s, Bordelon also provided illustrations and creative input for some Origin Systems video games.

In her later years, Melinda Bordelon lived in Austin, Texas and took up photography.
