= Ziggy Hood =

American football player (born 1987)

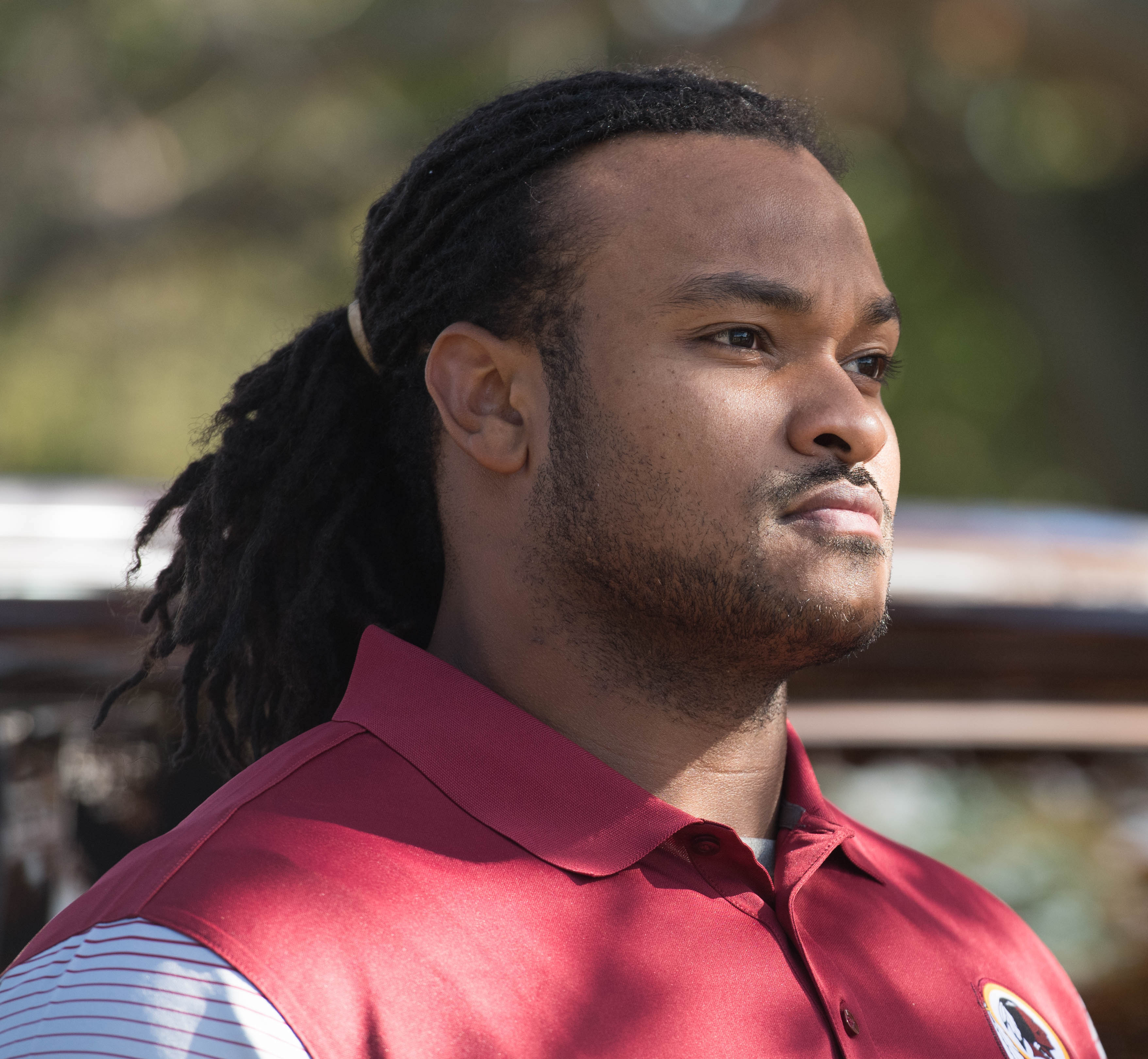
- Hood in 2016

No. 96, 92, 90, 97
- Position: Defensive tackle

Personal information
- Born: February 16, 1987 (age 39); Amarillo, Texas, U.S.
- Listed height: 6 ft 3 in (1.91 m)
- Listed weight: 305 lb (138 kg)

Career information
- High school: Amarillo (TX) Palo Duro
- College: Missouri (2005–2008)
- NFL draft: 2009: 1st round, 32nd overall pick

Career history
- Pittsburgh Steelers (2009–2013); Jacksonville Jaguars (2014–2015); Chicago Bears (2015); Washington Redskins (2016–2018); Miami Dolphins (2018); New Orleans Saints (2019)*
- * Offseason or practice squad member only

Awards and highlights
- First-team All-Big 12 (2008)

Career NFL statistics
- Total tackles: 231
- Sacks: 14.0
- Pass deflections: 11
- Forced fumbles: 1
- Fumble recoveries: 5
- Stats at Pro Football Reference

Evander Ja Mel "Ziggy" Hood (born February 16, 1987) is an American former professional football player who was a defensive tackle in the National Football League (NFL). He played college football for the Missouri Tigers, and was selected by the Pittsburgh Steelers in the first round (32nd overall) of the 2009 NFL draft. Hood was also a member of the Jacksonville Jaguars, Chicago Bears, Washington Redskins, Miami Dolphins, and New Orleans Saints.

== Early life ==
Hood attended Palo Duro High School in Amarillo, Texas, where he was a two-sport star in both football and track. In high school football, he earned All-District honors his junior and senior seasons. As a junior, he made 76 tackles, including 5.0 sacks and returned an interception for a touchdown. As a senior, he was named 3-4A Defensive Player of the Year after making 93 tackles, including 13.0 sacks, and scoring three defensive touchdowns.

In track and field, Hood was one of the states top performers in the throwing events. He got top-throws of 15.50 meters (50 ft 8in) in the shot put and 50.55 meters (165 ft 7in) in the discus throw.

== College career ==
Hood played college football at the University of Missouri. During his college career, he played defensive tackle. He finished with 170 tackles (98 solos), 15.5 sacks, 22.5 tackles for loss and 22 quarterback pressures. He also had five forced fumbles, recovering three.

== Professional career ==
Pre-draft measurables
Height	Weight	Arm length	Hand span	40-yard dash	10-yard split	20-yard split	20-yard shuttle	Three-cone drill	Vertical jump	Broad jump	Bench press
6 ft 2 7/8 in (1.90 m)	300 lb (136 kg)	33 3/4 in (0.86 m)	9 5/8 in (0.24 m)	4.97 s	1.73 s	2.86 s	4.45 s	7.32 s	34.5 in (0.88 m)	9 ft 8 in (2.95 m)	36 reps

=== Pittsburgh Steelers ===
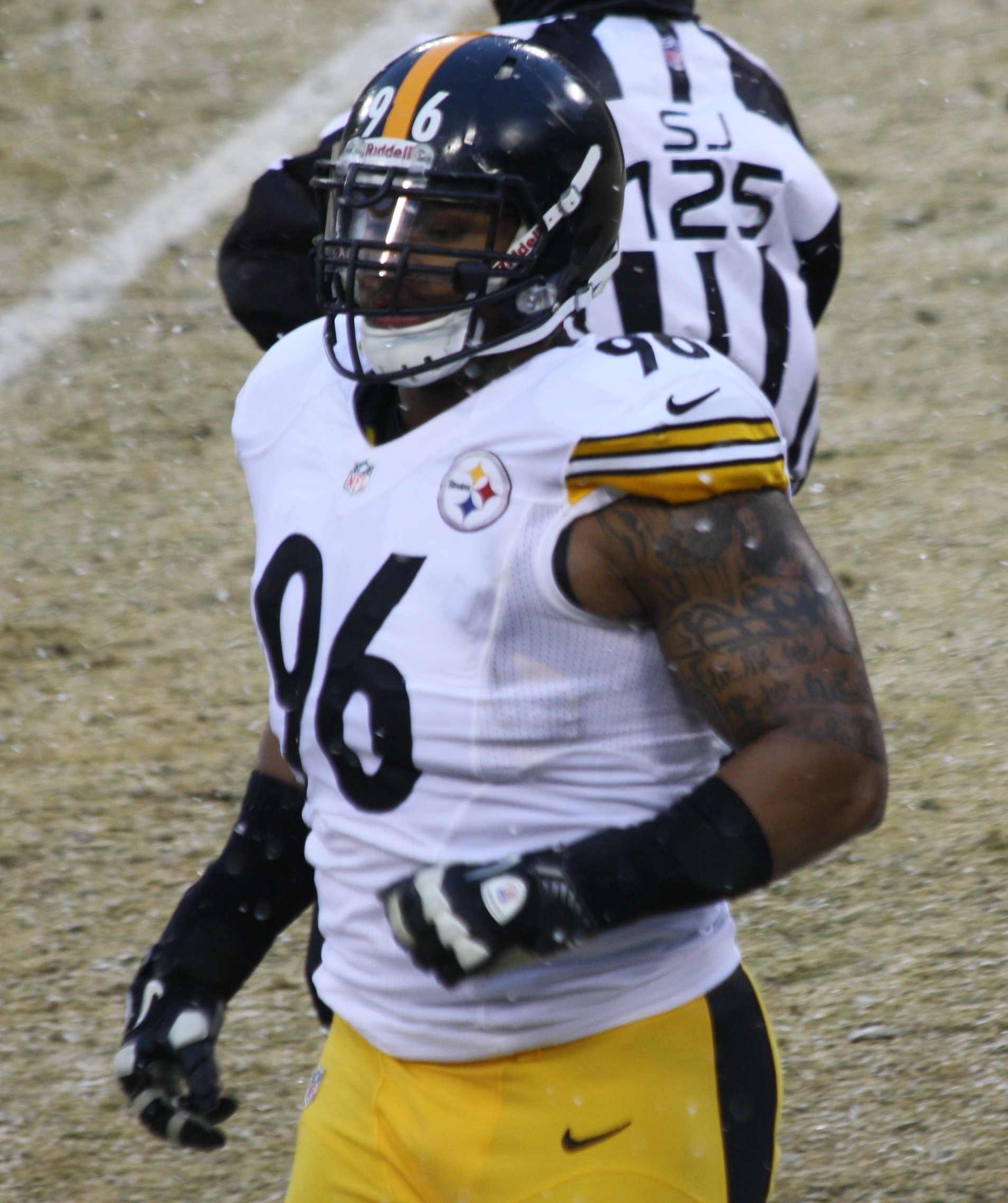
Hood with the Steelers in 2013

He was selected in the first round, 32nd overall, by the Pittsburgh Steelers in the 2009 NFL draft. He moved to defensive end in the Steelers' 3–4 defense, and served as a rotational back-up in his rookie year. Hood recorded both his first sack and first recovered fumble against the Baltimore Ravens on December 27, 2009.

At the end of the 2010 season, Hood and the Steelers appeared in Super Bowl XLV against the Green Bay Packers. He had one total tackle in the 31–25 loss.

=== Jacksonville Jaguars ===
On March 13, 2014, Hood signed a four-year, $16 million contract with the Jacksonville Jaguars. The Jaguars released him on October 20, 2015.

=== Chicago Bears ===
On October 22, 2015, the Chicago Bears signed Hood following the release of Jeremiah Ratliff. On December 15, he was waived by the Bears.

=== Washington Redskins ===
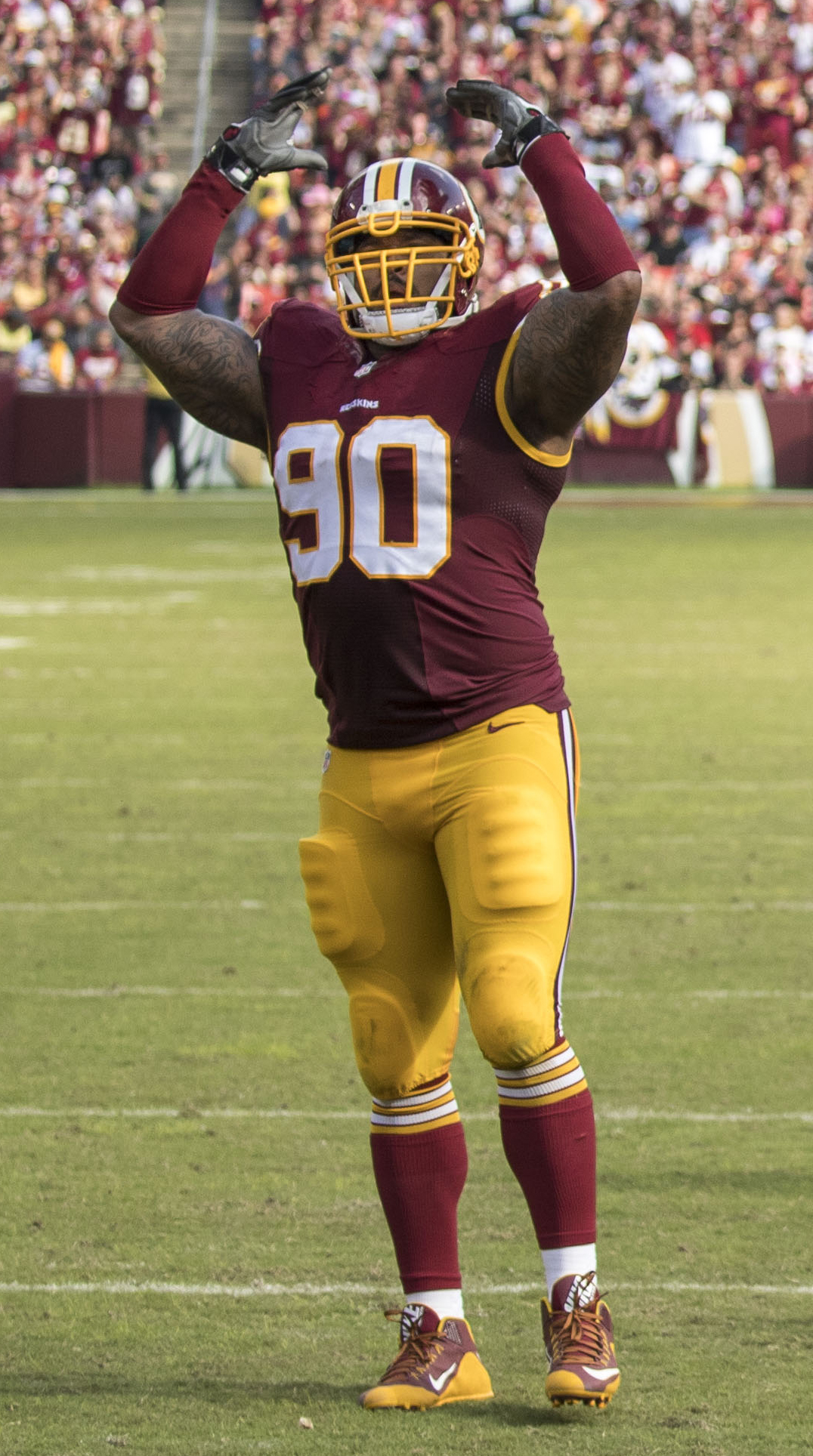
Hood with the Redskins in 2016

On February 2, 2016, Hood signed a one-year contract with the Washington Redskins. Hood re-signed on March 15, 2017.

On October 16, 2018, Hood was released by the Redskins.

=== Miami Dolphins ===
On October 30, 2018, Hood was signed by the Miami Dolphins.

=== New Orleans Saints ===
On July 24, 2019, Hood signed with the New Orleans Saints. He was released by New Orleans on August 31.

=== NFL statistics ===
Year	Team	Games		Tackles				Fumbles			Interceptions					
Year	Team	GP	GS	Comb	Total	Ast	Sack	FF	FR	Yards	Int	Yards	Avg	Long	TD	PD
2009	PIT	16	0	8	5	3	1.0	0	1	-1	0	0	0	0	0	2
2010	PIT	16	9	20	15	5	3.0	0	0	0	0	0	0	0	0	1
2011	PIT	16	14	31	19	12	1.5	0	0	0	0	0	0	0	0	1
2012	PIT	16	16	42	25	17	3.0	0	2	1	0	0	0	0	0	3
2013	PIT	16	7	39	26	13	3.0	0	1	0	0	0	0	0	0	0
2014	JAX	16	0	24	17	7	1.0	0	1	0	0	0	0	0	0	0
2015	CHI	2	0	0	0	0	0.0	0	0	0	0	0	0	0	0	0
2016	WSH	16	14	33	17	16	1.0	1	0	0	0	0	0	0	0	3
2017	WSH	15	13	25	13	12	0.5	0	0	0	0	0	0	0	0	0
2018	WSH	5	0	3	2	1	0.0	0	0	0	0	0	0	0	0	0
2018	MIA	8	0	6	2	4	0.0	0	0	0	0	0	0	0	0	1
Career		142	73	231	141	90	14.0	1	5	0	0	0	0	0	0	11

== Personal life ==
Hood was named by his father after former professional boxer Evander Holyfield, of whom his father was a fan. He is of half Mexican ancestry. During his childhood, his Mexican grandmother could not correctly pronounce Evander, so she started calling him by the name of her favorite cartoon character, Ziggy.
