= Waco Independent School District =

School district in Texas

Coordinates: 31.546°N 97.149°W

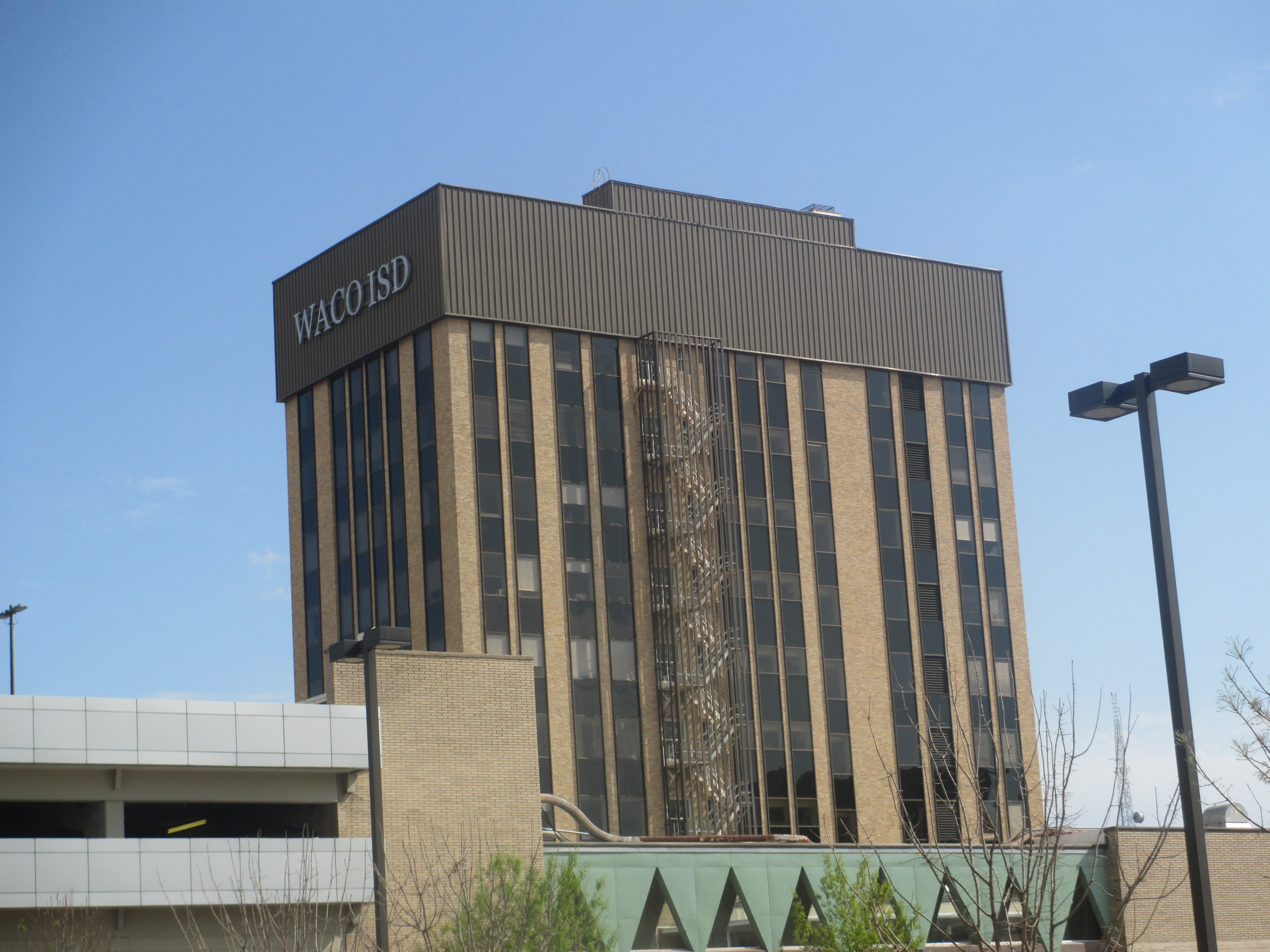
Waco Independent School District headquarters in downtown Waco, Texas

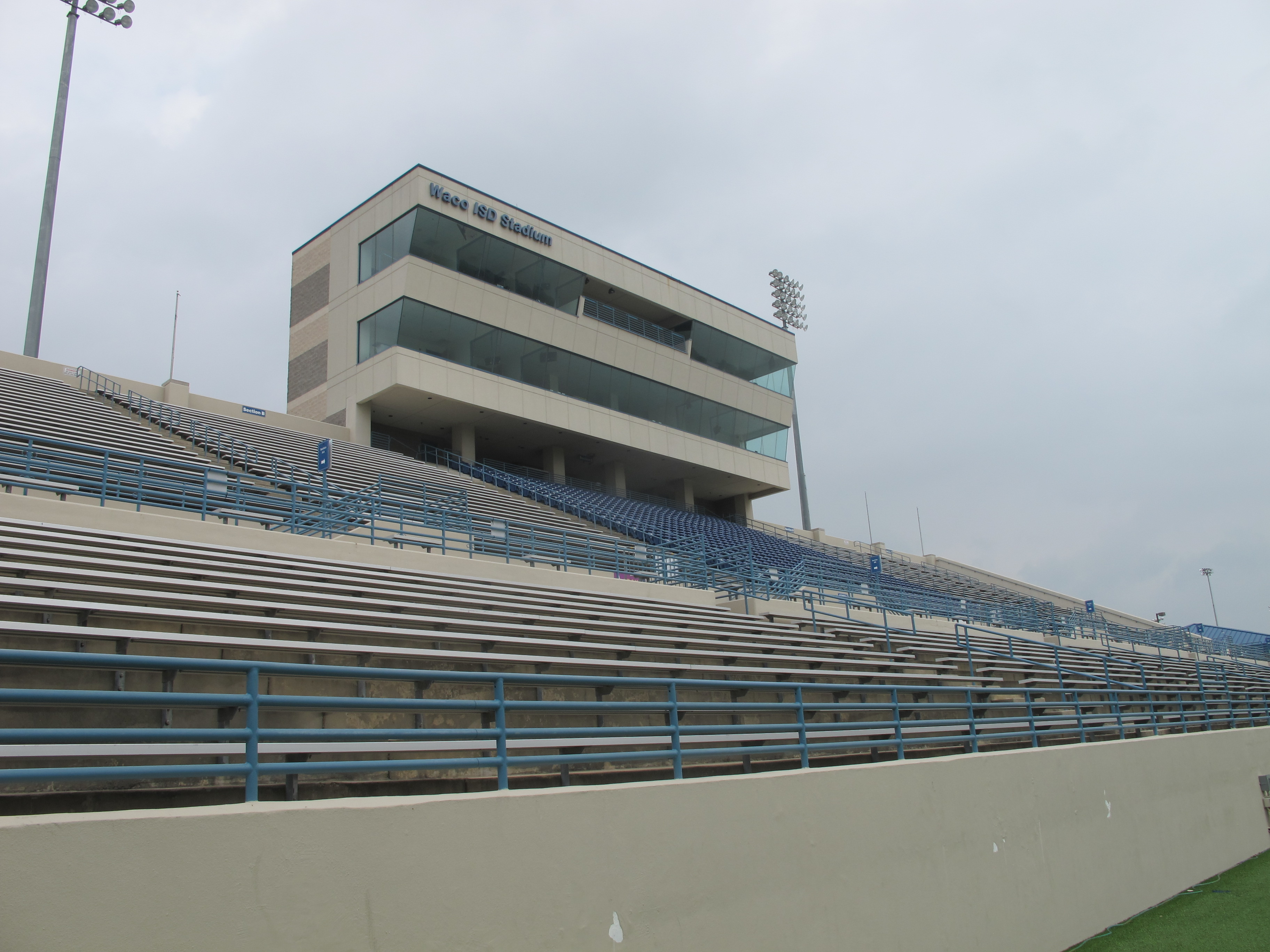
Waco ISD Stadium, 2016 Waco, Texas

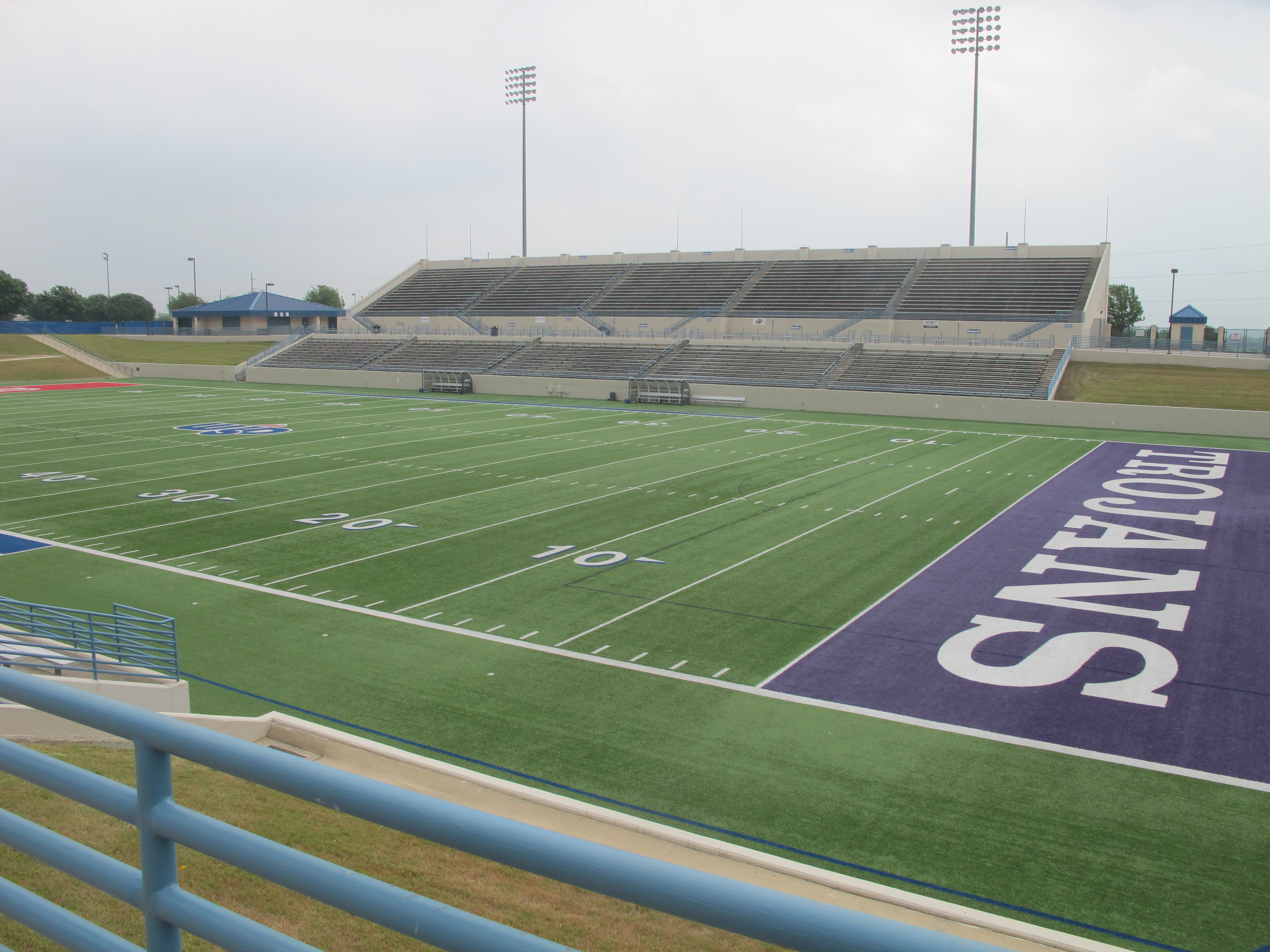
Waco ISD Stadium, Visitor Stand, 2016 Waco, Texas

Waco Independent School District is a public school district based in Waco, Texas (USA).

The district serves most of Waco, Beverly Hills, and a portion of Woodway.

In 2009, the school district was rated "academically acceptable" by the Texas Education Agency.

== Academics ==
"Waco ISD annually qualifies more students for State History Day than any other school district in Central Texas. In 2013, four Waco ISD students advanced to National History Day in College Park, Maryland."

== Schools Offered At Waco ISD ==
=== High Schools (Grades 9-12) ===
- Waco High School
- University High School
- A.J. Moore Academy (Magnet)

Former High School (s)

- Richfield High School (Closed)

=== Middle Schools (Grades 6-8) ===
- ATLAS Academy (Magnet)*For GT students
- Cesar Chavez Middle
- G.W. Carver Middle
- Lake Air Montessori (Magnet)
- Tennyson Middle

=== Former Middle Schools ===
- University Middle
- Brazos Middle
- Indian Spring

=== Elementary Schools (Grades PK-5) ===
- Bell's Hill
- Brook Avenue
- Cedar Ridge
- Crestview
- Dean Highland
- Hillcrest Professional Development School (Magnet)
- J.H. Hines
- Kendrick
- Lake Air Montessori (Magnet)
- Mountainview (International Baccalaureate)
- Parkdale
- Provident Heights
- South Waco
- West Avenue

=== Former Elementary Schools ===
- Alta Vista
- Doris Miller
- Meadowbrook
- North Waco
- Sul Ross
- Viking Hills

=== Other ===
- Greater Waco Advanced Health Care Academy
- Greater Waco Advanced Manufacturing Academy
- Wiley Opportunity Center (Alternative Campus)
- McLennan County Challenge Academy (Alternative Campus)

=== Extra Closed Buildings At WISD ===
- Brazos High Credit Recovery
- S.T.A.R.S. High
- Waco Alternative School
- Waco Charter School

=== Big Facilities ===
- Carver
- Tennyson
- Cesar Chavez
- Kendrick
- University
- Waco
- Bells Hill
- West Avenue
- Dean Highland

=== Small Facilities ===
- Provident Heights
- Brook Avenue
- JH Hines
- South Waco
- Mountainview
- Parkdale
- Crestview
- Cedar Ridge
- Hillcrest
- Lake Air
