= Molly White (politician) =

American politician

Texas State Representative from District 55 (Bell County)
- In office January 13, 2015 – January 9, 2017
- Preceded by: Ralph Sheffield
- Succeeded by: Hugh Shine

Personal details
- Born: Molly Suzanne Gosney; February 26, 1958 (age 68)
- Party: Republican
- Spouse: Ronald Wayne White
- Children: Tyrell Sayre White Robert N. White; Natalie White; Unnamed Child Unnamed Child
- Parent(s): Robert Russell and Thelma Jean Hefner Gosney
- Education: Belton High School; University of Mary Hardin–Baylor
- Occupation: Founder, Women for Life International

Molly Suzanne White (née Gosney; born February 26, 1958) is a former Republican member of the Texas House of Representatives. She represented District 55 for one term, from 2015 through 2017.

== Political activism ==
On January 29, 2015, White put up an Israeli flag in her office, and instructed her staff to ask Muslim constituents participating in "Texas Muslim Capitol Day" to "announce publicly allegiance to the United States", causing controversy. Governor Greg Abbott distanced himself from White's remarks and called for "civil discourse" regarding matters of this kind. In a follow-up social media post in February, White stated that her remarks had been misrepresented. White explained that the "genesis" behind her statement was that the Council on American–Islamic Relations (CAIR), which "started Muslim Day at the Texas Capitol" is "designated as a terrorist group by the United Arab Emirates." PolitiFact quoted a city council leader as stating that CAIR was among the organizations that started the annual Muslim Day. CAIR is not designated as a terrorist organization by the United States.

In the 2016 Republican primary election, Hugh Shine defeated White by 118 votes. White requested a recount, which was granted; her loss was confirmed.

Texas House of Representatives
Preceded by Ralph Sheffield	Texas State Representative from District 55 (Bell County); 2015–2017	Succeeded by Hugh Shine
