= Ralph Sheffield =

American politician

Member of the Texas House of Representatives from the 55th district
- In office November 20, 2008 – January 13, 2015
- Preceded by: Dianne White Delisi
- Succeeded by: Molly White

Personal details
- Born: Ralph Edgar Sheffield; January 11, 1955 (age 71) Waco, Texas, U.S.
- Party: Republican
- Spouse: Debbie Sheffield
- Children: 4

Ralph Edgar Sheffield (born January 11, 1955) is an American politician. He was a Republican member for the 55th district of the Texas House of Representatives from 2010 to 2015.

Sheffield was born in Waco, Texas. He attended Richfield High School, graduating in 1973. Within two years he had established his first restaurant. Sheffield is the owner of the Las Casas Restaurant and All Occasion Catering. In 2008 he was elected for the 55th district of the Texas House of Representatives. He was Vice Chair of the Defense and Veterans' Affairs Committee. In 2014 he was defeated in the Republican primary for the 55th district by Molly White, who succeeded him as representative in 2015.
