= Beverly Hills, Texas =

- City
- Interactive map of Beverly Hills, Texas
- Coordinates: 31°31′20″N 97°09′23″W
- Country: United States
- State: Texas
- County: McLennan

Area
  - Total: 0.66 sq mi (1.71 km^{2})
  - Land: 0.66 sq mi (1.71 km^{2})
  - Water: 0 sq mi (0.00 km^{2})
- Elevation: 512 ft (156 m)

Population (2020)
  - Total: 1,878
  - Density: 3,017.8/sq mi (1,165.16/km^{2})
- Time zone: UTC-6 (Central (CST))
  - Summer (DST): UTC-5 (CDT)
- ZIP code: 76711
- Area code: 254
- FIPS code: 48-08104
- GNIS feature ID: 2409841
- Website: beverlyhillstexas.net

Beverly Hills is an enclave city in McLennan County, Texas, United States. The population was 1,878 at the 2020 census. The city is surrounded by Waco and is part of the Waco Metropolitan Statistical Area.

== Geography ==
According to the United States Census Bureau, the city has a total area of 0.6 square miles (1.6 km^{2}), all land.

== Demographics ==
Historical population
Census	Pop.	Note	%±
1940	237		—
1950	701		195.8%
1960	1,728		146.5%
1970	2,289		32.5%
1980	2,083		−9.0%
1990	2,048		−1.7%
2000	2,113		3.2%
2010	1,995		−5.6%
2020	1,878		−5.9%
U.S. Decennial Census

=== 2020 census ===
As of the 2020 census, Beverly Hills had a population of 1,878. The median age was 33.3 years, 28.7% of residents were under the age of 18, and 13.2% of residents were 65 years of age or older. For every 100 females there were 98.7 males, and for every 100 females age 18 and over there were 102.3 males age 18 and over.

There were 622 households in Beverly Hills, of which 42.3% had children under the age of 18 living in them. Of all households, 44.5% were married-couple households, 20.4% were households with a male householder and no spouse or partner present, and 28.1% were households with a female householder and no spouse or partner present. About 22.5% of all households were made up of individuals and 8.4% had someone living alone who was 65 years of age or older.

There were 736 housing units, of which 15.5% were vacant. Among occupied housing units, 62.2% were owner-occupied and 37.8% were renter-occupied. The homeowner vacancy rate was 1.3% and the rental vacancy rate was 13.7%.

100.0% of residents lived in urban areas, while 0% lived in rural areas.

Racial composition as of the 2020 census
Race	Percent
White	39.1%
Black or African American	12.2%
American Indian and Alaska Native	2.3%
Asian	0.2%
Native Hawaiian and Other Pacific Islander	0%
Some other race	24.2%
Two or more races	21.9%
Hispanic or Latino (of any race)	62.2%

=== 2000 census ===
At the 2000 census there were 2,113 people in 769 households, including 541 families, in the city. The population density was 3,252.8 inhabitants per square mile (1,255.9/km^{2}). There were 814 housing units at an average density of 1,253.1 per square mile (483.8/km^{2}). The racial makeup of the city was 61.76% White, 10.70% African American, 0.43% Native American, 0.47% Asian, 24.42% from other races, and 2.22% from two or more races. Hispanic or Latino of any race were 44.30%.

Of the 769 households 34.2% had children under the age of 18 living with them, 53.1% were married couples living together, 12.9% had a female householder with no husband present, and 29.6% were non-families. 24.8% of households were one person and 11.2% were one person aged 65 or older. The average household size was 2.74 and the average family size was 3.29.

The age distribution was 29.1% under the age of 18, 12.0% from 18 to 24, 27.9% from 25 to 44, 18.9% from 45 to 64, and 12.2% 65 or older. The median age was 31 years. For every 100 females, there were 103.4 males. For every 100 females age 18 and over, there were 94.9 males.

The median household income was $29,896 and the median family income was $35,119. Males had a median income of $25,911 versus $18,718 for females. The per capita income for the city was $12,473. About 10.9% of families and 12.8% of the population were below the poverty line, including 14.4% of those under age 18 and 9.3% of those age 65 or over.

== Education ==
The City of Beverly Hills is served by the Waco Independent School District.

Areas in Beverly Hills are zoned to the following:

- Divided between Alta Vista, Bell's Hill, and Kendrick elementary schools
- Cesar Chavez Middle School
- University High School

Previously Meadowbrook Elementary School was in the city limits of Beverly Hills. The school was scheduled to close in 2012.

The charter school Harmony School of Innovation Waco (grades 6-12) is in the Beverly Hills city limits.

All of McLennan County is in the service area of McLennan Community College.

Other tertiary institutions in the area are Baylor University and Texas State Technical College.
