= Jim Wilson (pianist) =

American musician

- Born: James Wilson; Greenville, South Carolina
- Occupations: Musician, songwriter, technician
- Years active: 1981–present
- Notable work: Northern Seascape, Cape of Good Hope
- Website: Jim Wilson Music

Jim Wilson is an American recording artist and piano technician.

== Early life ==
Wilson was born in Greenville, South Carolina. When he was six, he and his family moved to Amarillo, Texas, where he grew up.

Wilson attended Tascosa High School in Amarillo where he was later inducted into its Hall of Fame on March 26, 2007.

== Career ==
=== Writing career ===
In 2024, Wilson released his memoirs outlining his unusual journey from the Texas countryside to the piano tuning for the world's biggest stars and finding his voice as a successful instrumental artist. The book includes exclusive stories about his interactions with Elton John, Paul McCartney, Carole King and more.

=== Recording career ===
Wilson is a Yamaha-endorsed recording artist of piano-featured instrumentals with 10 recordings released to date. Three of Wilson's albums have appeared on the Billboard Top-20 charts. PBS produced and aired the music special Jim Wilson: A Place in my Heart filmed live in Amarillo, Texas at the Globe-News Center. Wilson was accompanied by artists Eric Rigler and Romina Arena In addition to his work as a solo artist, Wilson has also been the keyboard player and musical director for recording artist Stephen Bishop since October, 2004.

In July, 2020, Wilson teamed up with Arlo Guthrie to release a well received recording of Stephen Foster's moving song "Hard Times Come Again No More". The song debuted on Rolling Stone's website as an editorial article and music video. The record was produced and performed by Wilson on Piano and sung by Guthrie featuring vocalist Vanessa Bryan. The separate pieces of the song and music video were mixed together from remote recordings made by each of the artists.

=== Piano technician career ===
Wilson has been a Registered Piano Technician with the Piano Technicians Guild since 1981. Wilson collaborated with the Burbank, California company, Spectrasonics on the release of "Keyscape", a new “virtual instrument that features the largest selection of unique, collector keyboards in the world” - including Wilson's personal, customized Yamaha C7. Ten years in the making, the library was released on September 1, 2016.

| Title | Details | Peak Chart Position |
|---|---|---|
| ‘’Northern Seascape’’ | Release date: 1999; Label: Angel EMI, Green Hill Music; Formats: CD | 21 |
| ‘’Cape of Good Hope’’ | Release date: 2001; Label: Green Hill Music, Willow Bay Music; Formats: CD | 8 |
| ‘’Quiet Shadows’’ | Release date: 2000; Label: Green Hill Music, Willow Bay Music; Formats: CD | - |
| ‘’Sanctuary (aka A Place in My Heart)’’ | Release date: 2004; Label: Green Hill Music, Willow Bay Music; Formats: CD | - |
| ‘’Beneath the Olympian Skies (aka Olympian Dreams)’’ | Release date: 2007; Label: Green Hill Music, Willow Bay Music; Formats: CD | - |
| ‘’My First Christmas With You’’ | Release date: 2008; Label: Green Hill Music; Formats: CD | - |
| ‘’Leader of the Band’’ | Release date: 2010; Label: Green Hill Music; Formats: CD | - |
| ‘’My Mother’s Son’’ | Release date: 2014; Label: Willow Bay Music; Formats: CD | - |
| ‘’Discovery’’ | Release date: 2014; Label: Willow Bay Music; Formats: CD | - |
| ‘’Remembrance’’ | Release date: 2018; Label: Willow Bay Music; Formats: CD | 2 |
