= LaMarcus McDonald =

American football player (born 1981)

Profile
- Position: Linebacker

Personal information
- Born: February 25, 1981 (age 45); Waco, Texas, USA

Career information
- High school: Waco High School
- College: Texas Christian University

Career history
- Cologne Centurions (2004)

LaMarcus DeWayne McDonald (born February 25, 1981, in Waco, Texas) is a former All-American linebacker at Texas Christian University in Fort Worth, Texas.

At Waco High School, McDonald was named to the first-team 5A All-State team by the Associated Press, and was teammates with former Kansas City Chiefs' linebacker Derrick Johnson.

At TCU, McDonald was a fan-favorite for his aggressive play on defense despite being undersized. In 2001, he finished with 7 sacks and set a school record with 25 tackles for loss. He was named second-team All-Conference USA.

In 2002, McDonald was a captain on the Horned Frogs' CUSA Championship team that finished the season 10-2 and defeated Colorado State in the Liberty Bowl. He led the team with 118 tackles, 8.5 sacks and 30 tackles for loss, which broke his own year-old school record. The 120 yards lost on those 30 tackles for loss broke the school record of 118, which was held by former Buffalo Bills' defensive end Aaron Schobel. After the season, McDonald was honored by the conference as first-team All-CUSA and was also named the Defensive Player of the Year. He was also named second-team All-American by the AP and first-team All-American by College Football News.

After leaving TCU, McDonald was signed as a free agent by the San Diego Chargers, but never caught on with the team. He last played for the Cologne Centurions of NFL Europe in 2004.
