= Juliana Yendork =

Ghanaian-American long jumper and triple jumper

Personal information
- Born: 29 August 1972 (age 54)
- Home town: Walnut, California, United States

Sport
- Sport: Track and field
Medal record
Representing Ghana
African Championships
Gold medal – first place	1988 Annaba	Long jump

Juliana Yendork (born 29 August 1972) is a retired Ghanaian American long jumper and triple jumper.

She won the gold medal at the 1988 African Championships. That year she also competed at the 1988 Olympic Games, one month before her 16th birthday to fulfill the dream of her father, Charles who had been denied the opportunity to compete in the 1976 Olympic Games by the hastily called African boycott. Her personal best jump was 6.32 metres, achieved in June 1989 in Schwechat.

She later became an American citizen, and focused on the triple jump, setting a career best of 13.42 metres in May 1991 in Norwalk in the qualification round of the CIF California State Meet while still at Walnut High School. That mark stood as the National High School Record for ten years. She won both the Long Jump and Triple Jump at the state meet three years in a row, each time by large margins. Her freshman year she competed for University High School in Waco, Texas.

She continued competing for UCLA, who also hired her father as their jumps coach. She was inducted into the Mt. SAC Relays Hall of Fame in 1993.
