= Perrish Cox =

American football player (born 1987)

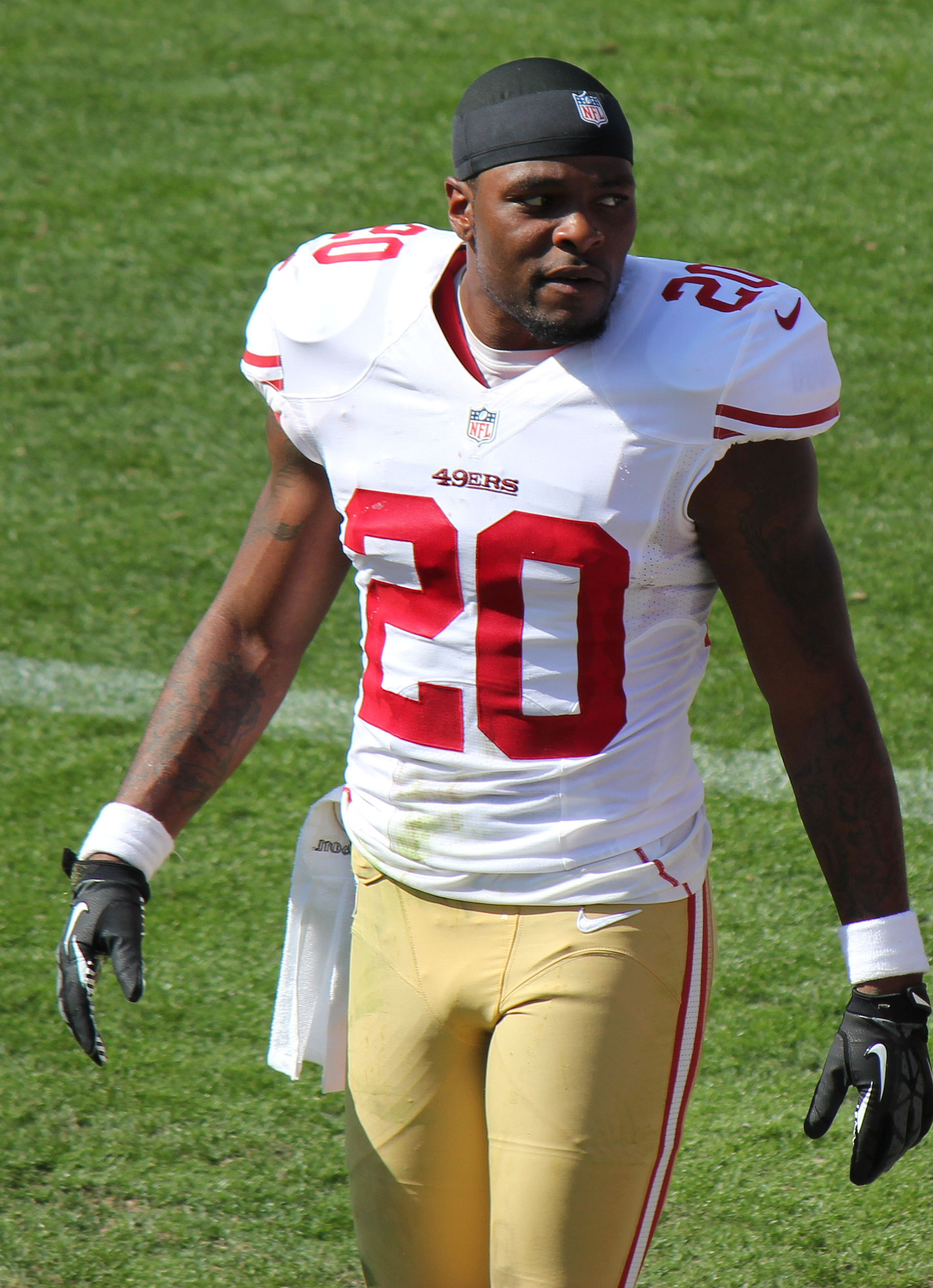
- Cox with the San Francisco 49ers in 2012

No. 32, 20, 30, 29
- Position: Cornerback

Personal information
- Born: January 10, 1987 (age 39); Waco, Texas, U.S.
- Listed height: 6 ft 0 in (1.83 m)
- Listed weight: 190 lb (86 kg)

Career information
- High school: University (Waco)
- College: Oklahoma State
- NFL draft: 2010: 5th round, 137th overall pick

Career history
- Denver Broncos (2010); San Francisco 49ers (2012–2013); Seattle Seahawks (2013); San Francisco 49ers (2013–2014); Tennessee Titans (2015–2016); Seattle Seahawks (2017)*
- * Offseason or practice squad member only

Awards and highlights
- First-team All-American (2009); First-team All-Big 12 (2009); Second-team All-Big 12 (2006)

Career NFL statistics
- Total tackles: 208
- Forced fumbles: 2
- Fumble recoveries: 2
- Pass deflections: 50
- Interceptions: 10
- Stats at Pro Football Reference

Perrish Eugene Cox (born January 10, 1987) is an American former professional football player who was a cornerback and return specialist in the National Football League (NFL). He played college football for the Oklahoma State Cowboys and was selected by the Denver Broncos in the fifth round of the 2010 NFL draft.

== Early life ==
Cox attended University High School in Waco, Texas, where he was a standout on both sides of the football. As a senior, Cox recorded 27 tackles and led the team with nine interceptions. On offense, he had 47 catches for 670 yards and 12 touchdowns. He earned first-team Class 4A all-state honors, first-team all-Central Texas honors, and played in the 2006 U.S. Army All-American Bowl.

Also a standout track & field athlete, Cox was one of the state's top performers in both sprints and jumps. As a sprinter, Cox had a personal-best time of 21.55 seconds in the 200-meter dash, and in jumps, he posted bests of 7.56 meters (24-7) in the long jump and 14.60 meters (47-9) in the triple jump.

Considered a four-star recruit by Rivals.com, Cox was listed as the No. 8 cornerback prospect in the nation. He chose Oklahoma State over LSU, Nebraska, and Oklahoma.

== College career ==
In his true freshman year at Oklahoma State University, Cox became the first Cowboy since Barry Sanders to open a season with a kickoff return for a touchdown when he went 96 yards against Missouri State. Playing both on defense and special teams, Cox had 24 tackles on defense while breaking up five passes. His 595 kickoff return yards in 2006 represent the third best single-season total in school history.

Cox became a starter during his sophomore year, as he started the last eight games of the regular season at cornerback. He tied for second on the team with two interceptions while breaking up eight passes, and was also credited with 42 tackles. Cox averaged 21.5 yards on 31 kickoff returns and his 631 kickoff return yards are second best for Oklahoma State in a single season.

As a junior, Cox again returned the first kickoff of the season 90 yards for a touchdown against Washington State. He finished the season with 32 tackles, eight pass break-ups, and two interceptions.

Cox entered his senior season just 110 kickoff return yards short of the Big 12 career record. In November 2009, he was named one of the twelve semifinalists for the 2009 Jim Thorpe Award.

== Professional career ==
=== Pre-draft ===
Cox was considered one of the best cornerbacks available in the 2010 NFL draft. His draft stock dropped after a slow 40-yard dash at the NFL Combine, but he was able to improve his workout numbers at OSU's Pro Day.

Pre-draft measurables
Height	Weight	Arm length	Hand span	40-yard dash	10-yard split	20-yard split	20-yard shuttle	Three-cone drill	Vertical jump	Broad jump	Bench press
5 ft 11 3/8 in (1.81 m)	195 lb (88 kg)	30 in (0.76 m)	8 3/8 in (0.21 m)	4.56 s	1.58 s	2.62 s	4.20 s	6.82 s	32.5 in (0.83 m)	9 ft 5 in (2.87 m)	12 reps
All values from NFL Combine (no full workout due to leg cramps)/Pro Day

=== Denver Broncos ===
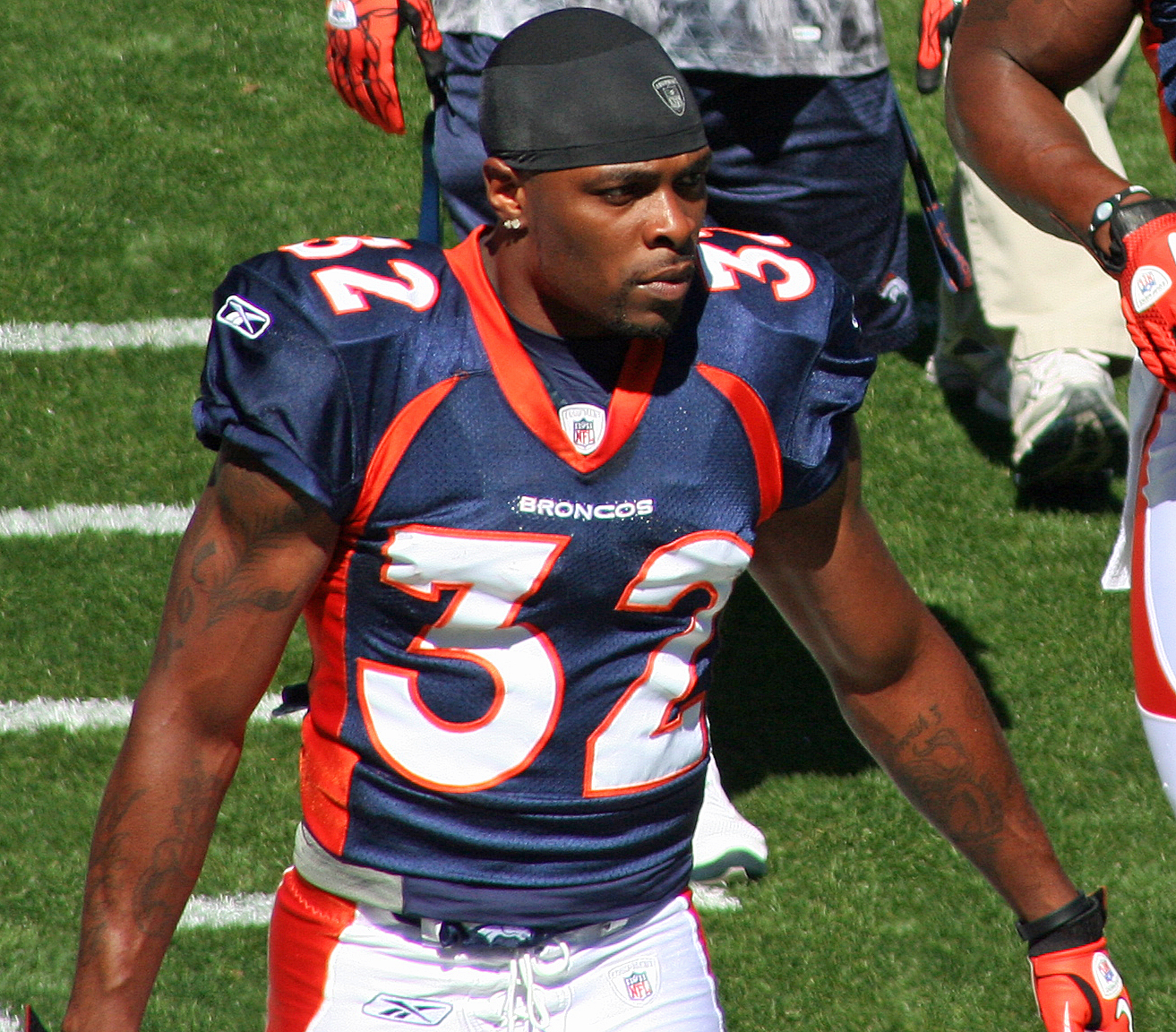
Cox at a game in Denver in September 2010.

Cox was selected by the Denver Broncos in the fifth round of the 2010 NFL draft with the 137th overall pick. He played one year for the team and was released on September 3, 2011.

=== San Francisco 49ers (first stint) ===
Cox signed with the San Francisco 49ers on a two-year deal on March 13, 2012. At the end of the 2012 season, Cox and the 49ers appeared in Super Bowl XLVII. In the game, he contributed on special teams, but the 49ers fell to the Baltimore Ravens by a score of 34–31. Cox was released by the 49ers on November 12, 2013 to make room on the active roster for returning linebacker Nick Moody.

=== Seattle Seahawks (first stint) ===
Cox was signed by the Seattle Seahawks on November 26, 2013. He was released by the Seahawks on November 27, 2013. On December 11, 2013, Cox re-signed with the Seahawks, after a season-ending injury to safety Jeron Johnson. He was once again released by the Seahawks on December 27, 2013.

=== San Francisco 49ers (second stint) ===
On December 30, 2013, Cox re-signed with the 49ers after an injury suffered by Carlos Rogers following the 23-20 victory over the Arizona Cardinals.

=== Tennessee Titans ===
On March 14, 2015, Cox signed a three-year, $15 million contract with the Tennessee Titans. On November 28, 2016, Cox was released by the Titans.

=== Seattle Seahawks (second stint) ===
On January 18, 2017, Cox signed with the Seahawks after an injury suffered by DeShawn Shead following the 36–20 loss to the Atlanta Falcons in the divisional round of the 2016 playoffs. On May 9, he was released by the Seahawks.

== NFL career statistics ==
Legend
**Bold**	Career high

=== Regular season ===
Year	Team	Games		Tackles					Interceptions					Fumbles			
Year	Team	GP	GS	Cmb	Solo	Ast	Sck	TFL	Int	Yds	TD	Lng	PD	FF	FR	Yds	TD
2010	DEN	15	9	**58**	**57**	1	0.0	**2**	1	15	0	15	14	**2**	0	0	0
2012	SFO	**16**	0	20	17	3	0.0	0	0	0	0	0	2	0	0	0	0
2013	SEA	2	0	3	3	0	0.0	0	0	0	0	0	0	0	0	0	0
2013	SFO	9	0	2	2	0	0.0	0	0	0	0	0	0	0	0	0	0
2014	SFO	15	**14**	53	49	4	0.0	0	**5**	12	0	10	**16**	0	**2**	0	0
2015	TEN	13	13	30	26	4	0.0	0	1	**27**	0	**27**	7	0	0	0	0
2016	TEN	11	9	42	37	**5**	0.0	0	3	3	0	3	11	0	0	0	0
		81	45	208	191	17	0.0	2	10	57	0	27	50	2	2	0	0

=== Playoffs ===
Year	Team	Games		Tackles					Interceptions					Fumbles			
Year	Team	GP	GS	Cmb	Solo	Ast	Sck	TFL	Int	Yds	TD	Lng	PD	FF	FR	Yds	TD
2012	SFO	**3**	0	**4**	3	**1**	0.0	0	0	0	0	0	0	0	0	0	0
2013	SFO	**3**	**1**	**4**	**4**	0	0.0	0	0	0	0	0	**2**	0	0	0	0
		6	1	8	7	1	0.0	0	0	0	0	0	2	0	0	0	0

== Legal issues ==
In August 2009, Cox was arrested for driving with a suspended license. He was also suspended from the Cotton Bowl in his senior season by head coach Mike Gundy for violating the team curfew rule.

Cox was arrested on December 9, 2010, for felonious sexual assault and taken to a Douglas County jail. He was released on December 10 on a $50,000 bond. His sexual assault charges were classified as class three and class four felonies which carry a sentence of two years to life in prison. He faced a possible sentence of ten years to life if convicted. However, on March 2, 2012, Cox was found not guilty of sexual assault charges in Douglas County, Colorado criminal court.
