= Hillary Hickland =

American politician

Member of the Texas House of Representatives from the 55th district
- Incumbent
- Assumed office January 14, 2025
- Preceded by: Hugh Shine
- Succeeded by: Amelia Rabroker (elect)

Personal details
- Born: October 18, 1982 (age 44) Jasper, Texas, U.S.
- Party: Republican
- Education: Baylor University; Boston University
- Website: Campaign website

Hillary Hickland is an American politician. She represents the 55th district of the Texas House of Representatives.

== Life and career ==
Hickland was born in Jasper, Texas. She attended Baylor University in 2005, earning her Bachelor's degree. She also attended Boston University in 2009, earning her Master's degree.

In March 2024, Hickland defeated incumbent Hugh Shine in the Republican primary election for the 55th district of the Texas House of Representatives. In November 2024, Hickland defeated Jennifer Lee, winning 57.6% of the vote. She succeeded Hugh Shine. She assumed office on January 14, 2025.
