= A.J. Moore Academy =

Coordinates: 31.5638°N 97.1336°W

A.J. Moore Academy Magnet High School
- 500 N.University Parks Drive Waco, TX 76701; United States

Information
- Type: Public Magnet
- Motto: Moore for your future!
- School district: Waco ISD
- Principal: Mrs. Angela Reiher
- Staff: 70
- Faculty: 56
- Grades: 9-12
- Enrollment: 677
- Colors: Blue, White, Black
- Mascot: Bulldog
- Affiliation: Professional Development School (Baylor University), Project Lead the Way, National Academy Foundation
- Website: A.J. Moore Website

Alexander James Moore Academy (more commonly referred to as A.J. Moore Academy) was a magnet high school in the Waco Independent School District district in Waco, TX. Special emphasis was placed on business, engineering, entrepreneurship, technology, and post-secondary education. In February 2012, Waco ISD decided in part, avoiding a $3.4 million budget shortfall, to close and consolidate A. J. Moore Academy with University High School. On June 2, 2012, A.J. Moore Academy gave diplomas to its last graduating class. A. J. Moore Academy existed as a stand-alone school for 14 years.

== Curriculum ==
A.J. Moore Academy was chosen by the National Academy Foundation (NAF) to be one of the twelve pilot sites in the US for the Academy of Information Technology and one of thirteen pilot sites for the Academy of Engineering. The school was the first school in the nation to include all four NAF academies including an Academy of Hospitality and Tourism and an Academy of Finance.

The Academy of Engineering is affiliated with Project Lead the Way (PLTW) since 2001. It was the sixth school in the State of Texas to become certified to offer PLTW courses for college credit. In 2007 the school became a pilot school for a new partnership between PLTW, NAF, and the National Action Council for Minorities in Engineering.

The school focused heavily on career choices and college preparation with guidance from school counselors, GEAR-UP professionals, and Princeton Review instructors. Students must obtain permission from the counselor or school principal to participate at local colleges and universities. Students took challenging course work, appropriate co-curricular activities and received guidance and counseling to help them enter the college of their choice.

Many Advanced Placement (AP) courses were offered at A.J. Moore Academy while an unusual amount of Dual Credit Courses (high school/college credit classes) are offered for a public high school. The Dual Credit Courses offered credit from the University of Texas at Arlington, McLennan Community College, Rochester Institute of Technology, and Texas State Technical College.

== History ==
The school was named after Professor A.J. Moore, the first principal and first African-American principal of an all (later segregated) black school that existed in Waco in the years following the American Civil War. A.J. Moore Academy was on a campus built for the school that was known as Jefferson-Moore High School (500 North University Parks Drive, Waco, Texas 76702). The school was almost completely remodeled during the 2009–2010 school year.

In 1986, three Waco High Schools (Jefferson Moore High School, Waco High School, and Richfield High School) were consolidated. The building that housed the defunct Jefferson-Moore High School was renamed the Waco 9th Grade Center in 1988. A.J. Moore Academy was chartered in 1997 and it became the only magnet high school in the Waco Independent School District. In 1997 the school began with only a ninth grade. Each year after that, the school added the next grade level to curriculum. In 2001, A.J. Moore Academy gave diplomas to its first graduating class.

Under the leadership of Dr. Debra Bishop, the school led the district into new education ideas such as job-specific academies, a business advisory board, and extensive college preparation. In 2010, Dr. Debra Bishop retired and Mrs. Angela Reiher became principal. Mrs. Reiher continued advancing the school culture and innovations that she helped create as Director of Academies and Assistant Principal during Dr. Bishop's era.

== Enrollment ==
Because it was a magnet school, any Waco Independent School District student could attend A.J. Moore Academy regardless of city limits or school boundary lines. An application was required but selection was made on a first-come basis. If more students applied than the school had space, a lottery was held to fill remaining slots.

== Extracurricular activities ==
- The Steel Ambassadors - A student Steel Drum band that performed at various fund raisers and events around Waco.
- Jazz Band
- Key Club - Part of Key Club International, the world's largest teenage volunteer organization.
- Competitive Swim Team
- Outdoor Leadership High Adventure Club - A leadership club that learned martial arts and outdoor survival skills.
- Drill Team (Dance)
- The Bulldog Battalion is A.J. Moore's Honor Unit JROTC program. Included competitive drill and orienteering teams.
- Spanish Club
- Texas Association of Future Educators
- Interact Club

== Academies ==
All students at A. J. Moore belonged to one of the following small learning communities for more career specific education:

- Academy of Engineering
- Academy of Environmental Technology
- Academy of Finance
- Academy of Information Technology
- Academy of Health Sciences
- Academy of Hospitality and Tourism

== Notable graduates ==
- Eddie Bernice Johnson (born 1935), U.S. House of Representatives from Texas's 30th district
- Billy G. Mills (born 1929), Los Angeles, California, City Council member, 1963–74, Superior Court judge thereafter
- Doris Miller (1919–1943), United States Navy serviceman, Navy Cross recipient
- Tom Wilson (1931–1978), record producer
- Anthony Angelo 1999–2001
- Benjamin Skinner (One of 7 members of the YouTube Group “RDC”)
