= Paul Tyson =

American football player and coach (1886–1950)

Biographical details
- Born: October 25, 1886; Hope, Arkansas, U.S.
- Died: September 9, 1950 (aged 63); Brownwood, Texas, U.S.

Playing career
- 1904–1907: Addison-Randolph

Coaching career (HC unless noted)
- 1913–1942: Waco HS (TX)

Head coaching record
- Overall: 209–57–16

Accomplishments and honors

Championships
- 1 National championship (1927); 4 Texas state (1922, 1925–1927)

Paul Leighton Tyson (October 25, 1886 – September 9, 1950) was an American football coach. He was one of the most successful high school football coaches of all time, winning four Texas state championships and one national championship in the 1920s. Knute Rockne called Tyson "one of the finest coaches I ever met, college or high school".

== Career ==
A native of Arkansas, Tyson enrolled at Addison-Randolph College in Waco, Texas, (later re-founded as Texas Christian University in Fort Worth, Texas) in 1904, intending to become a doctor. He went to a football game, tried out for the team the next week and made the starting line-up. He also lettered in baseball. In 1908, Tyson graduated from Addison-Randolph, and went to Pritzker School of Medicine in Chicago to study medicine. While playing baseball there, he was reportedly offered a contract to pitch for a major league team, but turned it down.

Returning to Texas, Tyson taught biology in Tyler to supplement his income while studying medicine. While at Tyler, the children recruited him as their "football supervisor". After teaching two more terms at Denison High School, Tyson finally decided to give up medicine for sports, when he became a biology teacher and football coach at Waco High School.

Though starting his career with a 1–3–2 season in 1913, Tyson's Waco teams did not have a losing season in the following 27 years under his guidance. Their dominance, however, truly began in the 1920s. Waco played six straight championship games between 1922 and 1927, losing only two. In 1927, after beating Notre Dame-Cathedral Latin School of Chardon, Ohio, 44–12 in a postseason game, Waco was recognized as a mythical national champion.

In a time when most teams relied on a basic offense run out of a short punt formation, Tyson revolutionized offensive tactics, developing a series of plays out of the single-wing formation, where one or both of the two backs receiving the snap would spin and cross paths with the remaining backs and ends. The so-called "spinner" was so effective, that Waco scored over a hundred points on nine occasions between 1922 1927. In 1927, the Tigers scored an average of 56 points per game—a record that stood until 1975 when Big Sandy High School scored 824 points for the season.

Tyson's teams were also known for their defense. Playing only a regular-season schedule, the 1921 team was the first of three squads to allow no points in a season. From 1921 to 1927, Waco had 58 shutouts. The 3–0 state title loss to Abilene High School in 1923 was Waco's only scoring blemish. Led by Boody Johnson, Tommy Glover, Jack Sisco and Sam Coates, Waco's defense gave up just 156 points in seven seasons.

Despite receiving several offers to coach college football teams, Tyson had no interest in leaving Waco. He attended and spoke at football clinics all over the country. Knute Rockne and Pop Warner routinely sought his opinions on offensive philosophy, and he was a favorite of reporters, who found him charismatic and humble and openly campaigned for major universities to hire him.

In spring 1942, the Waco school board suddenly and unanimously voted to fire Tyson after an 8–2 season, two removed from a year he took the Tigers to the state finals. Tyson, a lifelong bachelor who never dated, was rumored to be "too intimate" with his players.
