= Palo Duro High School =

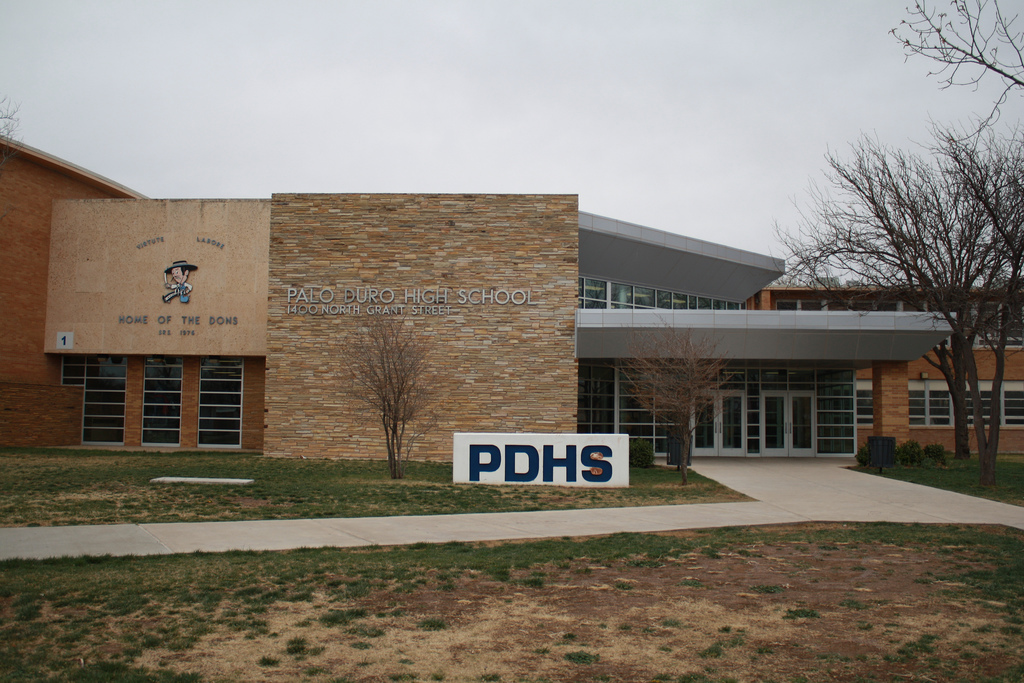

Location
- 1400 N Grant; Amarillo, Texas 79107-3999; United States; 35.22675°N 101.82454°W

Information
- School type: Public high school
- Established: 1955
- School district: Amarillo Independent School District
- Principal: Brandy Self
- Teaching staff: 127.21 (FTE)
- Grades: 9-12
- Enrollment: 1,902 (2023-2024)
- Student to teacher ratio: 14.95
- Colors: Royal Blue & White
- Athletics conference: UIL 5A D2
- Mascot: Don
- Yearbook: The Conquistador
- Website: Palo Duro High School

Palo Duro High School is a school located in the city of Amarillo, Texas, United States, and is one of four high schools in the Amarillo Independent School District. As of the 2016–17 school year, it has 2,075 students.

The school was named after Palo Duro Canyon, a canyon system in the Texas Panhandle.

Palo Duro High school
Property:	PDHS	AMAISD	STATEWIDE
average teacher experience	9.3 yrs.	12 yrs.	10.9yrs
students per teacher	14.9	14.6	15.1
four-year graduation rate	89.4%	92.8%	89.1%
dropout rates	2.9%	-	24%

Risk Factors
Risk Factors:	PDHS	AMAISD	STATEWIDE
At-Risk Students	66.5%	47%	50.3%
Economically Disadvantaged	85.9%	68.1%	59%
Limited English Proficiency	18.1%	15.2%	18.9%

Classified as a 5A school by the UIL. in 2015, the school was rated "Met Standard" by the Texas Education Agency.

Enrollment by Program
Program	PDHS	AMAISD	STATEWIDE
Bilingual/ESL	17.8%	15.3%	18.8%
Career and Technical	66.9%	26.6%	25%
Gifted and Talented	3.9%	5.5%	7.8%
Special Education	9.8%	10.3%	8.8%

== Heritage, Traditions, and Other Customs. ==
Palo Duro High School or maybe known by its nickname "the Pride of the Northside". With the motto "Virtute Et Labore" meaning power and labor in Latin. Palo Duro is one of the most ethnically diverse in the city, with students ranging from Hispanic to Asian, and African students.

ethnicity
Race:	TOTAL	PDHS	AMAISD	STATEWIDE
Hispanic	1,173	56.5%	45.7%	52.4%
African-American	357	17.2%	10.2%	12.6%
American Indian	2	0.1%	0.4%	0.4%
Asian	297	14.3%	5.6%	4.2%
White	199	9.6%	34.9%	28.1%
Pacific Islander	1	0.1%	0.1%	0.1%
Two or More races	46	2.2%	3%	2.2%

== Athletics ==
The Palo Duro Dons compete in these sports -

Cross Country, Volleyball, Football, Wrestling, Basketball, Swimming, Soccer, Golf, Bowling, Tennis, Track, Softball & Baseball

=== State Titles ===
- Boys Basketball -
  - 1956(3A)
- Girls Wrestling -
  - 2001(All), 2003(All)

== 1992 shooting ==
On September 11, 1992, then 17-year-old Randy Earl Matthews who transferred to the school from Memphis High School in Memphis, Texas at the start of the school year, shot and wounded 6 students with a .22-caliber revolver inside a hallway after a morning pep rally for a football game against Hereford High School. Luckily, all 6 students survived the shooting. Amarillo Police quickly caught him and another student who attempted to flee the scene. Matthews was charged with one count of attempted murder, five counts of aggravated assault and one count of unlawfully carrying a weapon onto school grounds, in which he served 8 years. The other student who was with him was also arrested. The shooting was believed to be a "gang shooting", all stemming from a fight in which a student had punched Matthews in the face.

== Feeder schools (Palo Duro Cluster) ==
=== Middle schools ===
- Horace Mann Middle School
- Travis Middle School
- Travis 6th Grade Campus
- Allen Middle School (6th Grade campus)

=== Elementary schools ===
- Eastridge Elementary
- Emerson Elementary
- Forest Hill Elementary
- Hamlet Elementary
- Park Hills Elementary
- Mesa Verde Elementary
- Pleasant Valley Elementary
- Will Rogers Elementary
- Whittier Elementary

== Notable alumni ==
- Michael Cobbins (born 1992), basketball player for Maccabi Haifa of the Israeli Basketball Premier League
- Thomas E. Creek (Class of 1968), Medal of Honor recipient
- Jinh Yu Frey (Class of 2003), professional Mixed Martial Artist, Invicta FC Atomweight Champion
- Ziggy Hood (Class of 2005), NFL football player
- Montrel Meander (Class of 2013), NFL player
- Oscar Priego (Class of 2004), soap opera actor
- Terry Stafford (Class of 1960), country music singer & songwriter
- William Thomas (Class of 1987), NFL player

== Notable staff ==
- Shanna Peeples, 2015 National Teacher of the Year.
