= Waco High School =

Waco, Texas high school

Location
- 4200 Colcord Avenue; Waco, Texas; United States

Information
- Type: Public High School
- School district: Waco ISD
- Principal: Joseph Alexander
- Faculty: 139
- Teaching staff: 143.82 (FTE)
- Grades: 9–12
- Enrollment: 1,778 (2023-2024)
- Student to teacher ratio: 12.36
- Colors: Scarlet, gray and white
- Athletics: UIL Class 5A
- Mascot: Lion
- Yearbook: Pride
- Website: https://whs.wacoisd.org/

Waco High School is a public high school located in the city of Waco, Texas and classified as a 5A school by the UIL. It is a part of the Waco Independent School District located in central McLennan County. In 2015, the school was rated “Improvement Required” by the Texas Education Agency.

Waco High School's attendance boundary includes sections of Waco and the Waco ISD portion of Woodway.

== History ==
- Waco High School
- U.S. National Register of Historic Places
- U.S. Historic district – Contributing property
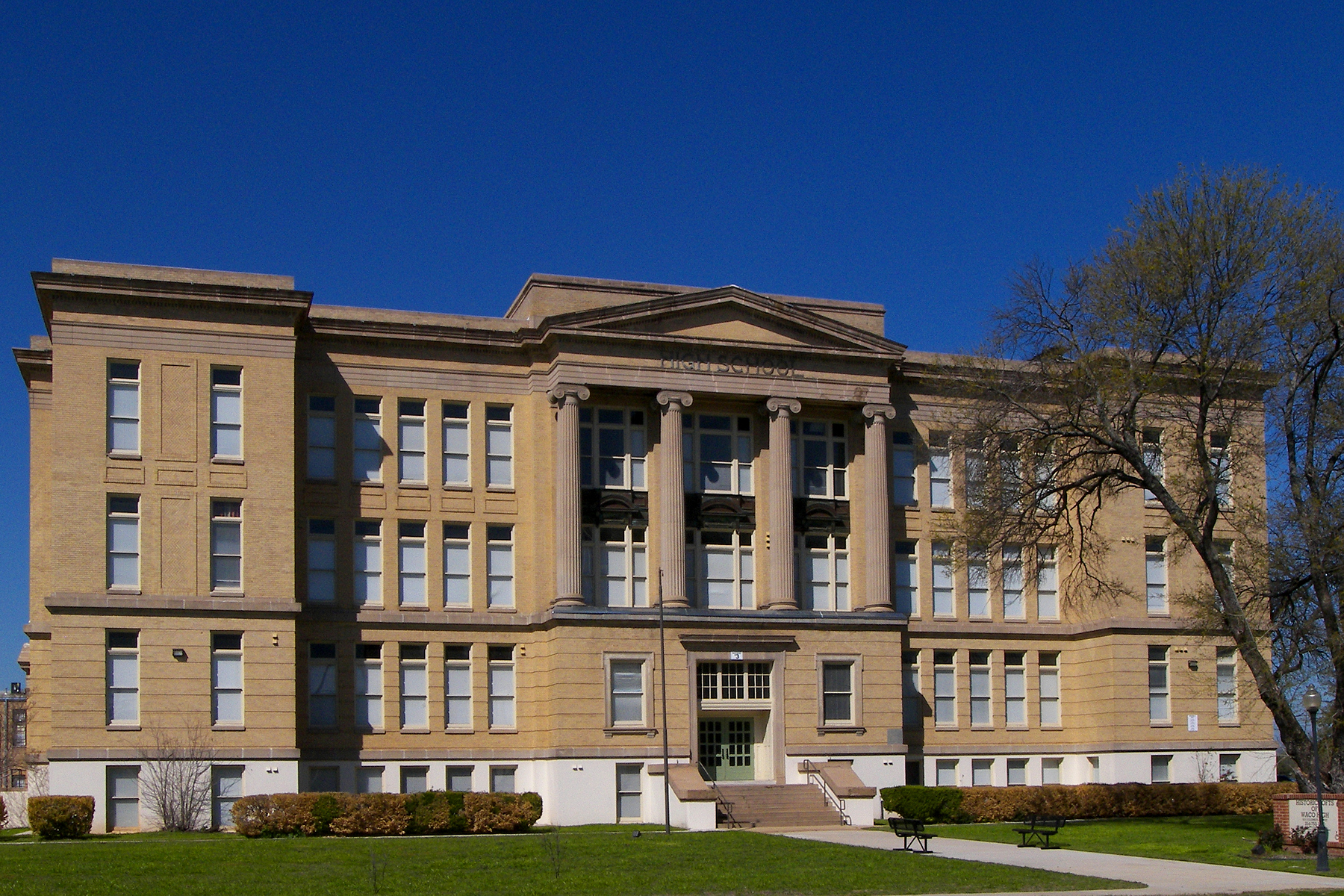
- Former Waco High School in 2012

- Location within Texas Location within the United States
- Location: 815 Columbus Ave.
- Coordinates: 31°33′28″N 97°8′16″W
- Area: 4.2 acres (1.7 ha)
- Built: 1912
- Architect: Milton W. Scott
- Architectural style: Classical Revival, Late Gothic Revival
- Part of: Waco Downtown Historic District (ID11001094)
- NRHP reference No.: 09000140

Significant dates
- Added to NRHP: March 17, 2009
- Designated CP: February 3, 2012

The first home of Waco High School, or Central High as it was then called, was on the lot at Fourth and Webster streets in the early 1880s. There were two buildings, and one had formerly been the Episcopal church with the bell still in the tower. This was the only public school building west of the Brazos. In 1886–1887, these were replaced by a brick building, and in 1911, at Thanksgiving time, the new building on Columbus Avenue was ready for occupancy. Since then wings have been added to it and a building constructed as an auditorium and gymnasium. The old Baker residence, across the street, was purchased in 1942 for the use of bands and orchestras.

In the 1970s, it moved to a new location on the corner of North 19th and College Drive, which is now the campus of McLennan Community College.

In 1986, Waco High was consolidated with Jefferson-Moore High School and Richfield High School. The new school at the former Richfield campus on North 42nd Street used the Waco High name, but incorporated aspects of the other two schools into its identity. The lion mascot was adopted from Jefferson-Moore and the school colors (scarlet, white, and gray) were taken from Richfield.

With the merger, Waco High was classified as a UIL Class 5A school. It moved down to the second-highest classification, Class 4A, in 2006. (Class 4A was then renamed Class 5A beginning in the fall of 2014.)

== Athletics ==
The Waco Lions compete in these sports -

Volleyball, Cross Country, Football, Basketball, Powerlifting, Soccer, Golf, Tennis, Track, Softball & Baseball

=== State Titles ===
- Football -
  - 1922(All), 1925(1A), 1926(1A), 1927(1A), 1945(2A)^, 1948(2A)

^Co-champions with Highland Park High School

==== State Finalist ====
- Boys Basketball -
  - 1955(4A)
- Football -
  - 1923(All), 1924(All), 1939(2A), 2006(4A/D2)

==== Paul Tyson era ====
The Waco High Tigers saw much success under head coach Paul Tyson, hired in 1913, who was one of the best known and most successful high school football coaches in America. His teams at Waco High played in seven state championship games, including six consecutive appearances from 1922 to 1927. The Tigers won state titles in 1922, 1925, 1926, and 1927, with runner-up finishes in 1923, 1924, and 1939.

In 1927, Waco High had one of the most dominant seasons in Texas high school football history. The Tigers scored an average of 56 points per game (a record that would stand until 1975, when Big Sandy scored 824 points in 14 games) while giving up only 2.4 points per game to its opponents. On two occasions Waco High scored more than 100 points, once in a playoff game versus Houston Davis. Roy Needham, Davis' coach, said "Waco could have beaten a good college team" that day.

During that same 1927 season, Waco High was recognized as the mythical national high school champion after defeating Notre Dame-Cathedral Latin High School of Chardon, Ohio in a postseason game, 44–12.

In the spring of 1942, the Waco school board suddenly and unanimously voted to fire Tyson after an 8–2 season, two years removed from a year he took the Tigers to the state finals. Tyson, a lifelong bachelor who never dated, was rumored to be "too intimate" with his players.

Waco High won two more state titles after Tyson. In 1945, they shared the championship with Highland Park after the title game ended in a 7–7 tie, and won outright in 1948, when the Tigers beat Amarillo, 21–0.

==== Modern era ====
Under coach Johnny Tusa, who coached at Jefferson-Moore from 1979 to 1985 and Waco High from 1986 to 2009, Waco made the playoffs in 1986–88, 1990–92, 1994–2002, and 2004–2006.

In 1991, Waco High had its longest run in the Class 5A playoffs, five rounds deep to the state semifinals. The Lions lost to the famed Odessa Permian team before a sellout crowd at Ratliff Stadium in Odessa, 37–8. The Lions beat Austin Crockett, Conroe McCullough (now The Woodlands), Richardson Berkner, and Dallas Carter in the previous four rounds.

In 2006, Waco High was classified a Class 4A school and placed in District 16-4A by the UIL. The district contained fellow former 5A rival Copperas Cove, plus Brownwood, Killeen, and Waco-area schools University and Midway. The Lions won the district title with a perfect record that year. Waco High made another deep playoff run, defeating Corsicana, Dallas Hillcrest, Whitehouse, Brownwood, and Wolfforth Frenship to advance to the Class 4A Division II state championship game at the Alamodome in San Antonio. The Lions lost to La Marque, 36–14.

In 2007, Waco High put together another undefeated district run for the 16-4A title, with its only loss in non-district to Euless Trinity. The Lions lost in the first round of the playoffs in four overtimes to Ennis. In 2008, the team made the playoffs and lost to Lancaster in bi-district.

Before the 2009 season, head coach Johnny Tusa retired after a 31-year head coaching career in Waco ISD. The district hired offensive coordinator Danny Ramsey from Cypress Creek High School as head coach, who converted the team's long-time traditional power running offense into a triple spread option. That year, the team went 2-8 and tied its worst record ever. Despite another losing record in 2010, the Lions returned to the playoffs, falling in the second round to eventual state champion Aledo. Waco High posted a winning record in 2011, but lost to Mansfield Summit in the first round of the playoffs.

In 2012, under new head coach Marty Herbst, a longtime assistant under Tusa, the Lions went three rounds deep in the playoffs, losing to Wolfforth Frenship. Another loss to an eventual state champion, Denton Guyer, ended Waco High's 2013 season in the second round of the playoffs.

== Facilities ==
Waco ISD Stadium was built in 2000 and replaced the historic 10,000-seat Paul Tyson Stadium located behind Waco High School on Lake Air Drive. (Tyson Stadium is still in use for some football games and track events.) The new stadium is located at the corner of New Road and Bagby Avenue in Waco, approximately half a mile from I-35. The first game played at the stadium was Waco High vs. University High on September 8, 2000. Waco High won the game, 22–0, in front of a crowd estimated at 14,000.

== Theater ==
=== State Titles ===
- One Act Play -
  - 1941(All), 1942(All)

=== Dallas Summer Musical High School Musical Theater Awards ===
- Awards
  - 2015:Tarzan Best Scenic Design, Tarzan Best Costume Design
- Nominations
  - 2013: Into the Woods Best Lighting Design
  - 2017: Xanadu Best Costume Design

== Notable alumni ==
- Bruce Alford Sr., former NFL player
- Joe Barton, United States Congressman
- Kevin Belcher, professional baseball player
- Cloyce Box, former NFL player
- Benny Boynton, former NFL player
- T. Berry Brazelton, pediatrician, author and developer of Neonatal Behavioral Assessment Scale
- Paul Dickson, former NFL player
- Claudius Miller Easley, United States Army Brigadier General
- Lin Elliot, former NFL player
- Hi-Five, R&B group
- Leon Jaworski, Watergate special prosecutor
- Derrick Johnson, former Texas football linebacker, Kansas City Chiefs legend
- Dutch Meyer, professional baseball player
- Beasley Reece, former NFL player and broadcast commentator
- Ann Richards, Governor of Texas
- Martin Ruby, former NFL player
- George Sauer, Jr., former NFL player for the New York Jets
- Hank Thompson, honky-tonk musician and member of the Country Music and Nashville Songwriter halls of fame
- Windol Weaver, politician
- James "Froggy" Williams, college football hall of famer
- Shannon Elizabeth, Actress
- LaMarcus McDonald Outstanding Linebacker TCU Texas Christian University NFL San Diego Chargers
- Andrew Billings, current NFL member with the Chicago Bears, former Baylor Bear All Big 12, current Texas Super Heavy Weight High School Powerlifting Record Holder

== See also ==
- National Register of Historic Places listings in McLennan County, Texas
