= Amarillo Independent School District =

School district in Texas, US

- Logo of Amarillo Independent School District

Location
- 7200 I 40 W Amarillo, Texas ESC Region 16 United States
- Coordinates: 35°11′16″N 101°55′2″W

District information
- Type: Independent school district
- Motto: Preparing Every Student For Success Beyond High School.
- Grades: Pre-K through 12
- Established: 1889
- Superintendent: Dr. Diedre Parish
- Schools: 56 (2016-17)
- NCES District ID: 4808130

Students and staff
- Students: 32,682 (2010-11)
- Teachers: 2,190.46 (2009-10) (on full-time equivalent (FTE) basis)
- Student–teacher ratio: 14.56 (2009-10)

Other information
- TEA District Accountability Rating for 2011-12: Academically Acceptable
- Website: Amarillo ISD

Amarillo Independent School District is a school district that is based in the city of Amarillo, Texas, United States. Amarillo ISD covers about 70 square miles (180 km^{2}) of land in Randall County and Potter County. In the 2009-2010 academic term, nearly 32,000 students were enrolled.

== Finances ==
As of the 2010-2011 school year, the appraised valuation of property in the district was $7,244,290,000. The maintenance tax rate was $0.108 and the bond tax rate was $0.009 per $100 of appraised valuation.

== Academic achievement ==
In 2011, the school district was rated "academically acceptable" by the Texas Education Agency. Forty-nine percent of districts in Texas in 2011 received the same rating. No state accountability ratings will be given to districts in 2012. A school district in Texas can receive one of four possible rankings from the Texas Education Agency: Exemplary (the highest possible ranking), Recognized, Academically Acceptable, and Academically Unacceptable (the lowest possible ranking).

Historical district TEA accountability ratings

- 2011: Academically Acceptable
- 2010: Recognized
- 2009: Academically Acceptable
- 2008: Academically Acceptable
- 2007: Academically Acceptable
- 2006: Academically Acceptable
- 2005: Academically Acceptable
- 2004: Academically Acceptable

== List of schools ==
=== High schools ===
- Amarillo High School
- Caprock High School
- Palo Duro High School
- Tascosa High School

==== Specialized instruction ====
- AmTech Career Academy (AACAL)
- Homebound
- North Heights Alternative

=== Middle schools ===
- Austin Middle School
- Bonham Middle School
  - 1999-2000 National Blue Ribbon School
- Bowie Middle School
- Bowie 6th Grade Campus
- Crockett Middle School
  - 1994-96 National Blue Ribbon School
- Lorenzo de Zavala Middle School
- Fannin Middle School
- Houston Middle School
- Johnny N. Allen 6th Grade Campus
- Mann Middle School
- Travis Middle School
- Travis 6th Grade Campus

=== Elementary schools ===
- Avondale Elementary
- Belmar Elementary
- Bivins Elementary
  - 2008 National Blue Ribbon School
- Carver Early Childhood Academy
- Carver Elementary Academy
- Coronado Elementary
- Eastridge Elementary
- Emerson Elementary
- Forest Hill Elementary
- Glenwood Elementary
- Hamlet Elementary School
- Humphrey's Highland Elementary
- Lamar Elementary
- Landergin Elementary School
- Lawndale Elementary School
- Oak Dale Elementary School
- Olsen Park Elementary
- Paramount Terrace Elementary
- Puckett Elementary
- Ridgecrest Elementary
- Rogers Elementary
- San Jacinto Elementary
- Sanborn Elementary
- Sleepy Hollow Elementary
  - 2006 National Blue Ribbon School
- South Georgia Elementary
- South Lawn Elementary
- Tradewind Elementary
- Western Plateau Elementary
- Whittier Elementary
  - 2017 National Blue Ribbon School
- Wills Elementary
- Windsor Elementary
- Wolflin Elementary
- Woodlands Elementary
  - 2005 National Blue Ribbon School

== See also ==
- List of school districts in Texas
- List of high schools in Texas
