= Texas's 55th House of Representatives district =

American legislative district

Texas's 55th State House of Representatives district
Representative
Hillary Hickland; R–Temple
- Demographics: 45.9% White; 22.9% Black; 25.8% Hispanic; 4.9% Asian
- Population (2020) • Voting age: 199,548; 159,656

The 55th district of the Texas House of Representatives contains roughly half of the population of Bell County, including most of the cities of Temple and Belton, and parts of Killeen. The current representative is Hillary Hickland, who was first elected in 2024.

== List of representatives ==
Leg.	Portrait	Representative	Party	Term start	Term end	Counties represented
5th		John R. Baylor	?	November 8, 1853	November 5, 1855	Fayette
