= Tascosa High School =

Coordinates: 35°11′37.55″N 101°52′50.96″W

Location
- 3921 Westlawn; Amarillo, Texas 79102-1795; United States

Information
- School type: Public high school
- Established: 1958
- School district: Amarillo Independent School District
- Principal: Blake Barton
- Teaching staff: 133.38 (FTE)
- Grades: 9-12
- Enrollment: 2,208 (2023-2024)
- Student to teacher ratio: 16.55
- Colors: Scarlet & Black
- Athletics conference: UIL Class 5A D1
- Mascot: Rebels
- Yearbook: Las Memorias
- Website: www.amaisd.org/ths

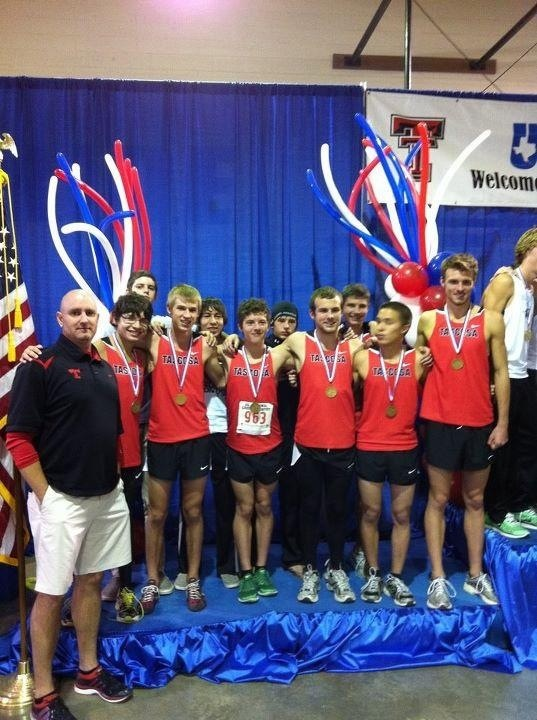
Tascosa boys qualified for their first ever state meet in 2011

Tascosa High School is a public high school located in Amarillo, Texas (USA) and classified as a 5A school by the UIL. It is one of four high schools in the Amarillo Independent School District located in southern Potter County. The school was opened in 1958. In 2015, the school was rated "Met Standard" by the Texas Education Agency. The school's motto is Non Sibi Sed Omnibus, a Latin phrase meaning "Not for oneself, but for all."

== Athletics ==
The Tascosa Rebels compete in the following sports -

Cross Country, Cheerleading, Drill team, Volleyball, Football, Wrestling, Basketball, Swimming, Soccer, Golf, Tennis, Track, Softball& Baseball

=== State titles ===
- Girls Basketball -
  - 1991(5A)
- Team Tennis -
  - 1996(5A)
- Boys Track -
  - 1963(4A)
- Girls Wrestling -
  - 2002(All), 2014(5A)
- One Act Play -
  - 1969(4A), 1971(4A) boys wrestling (5A) 2023

== Feeder Schools ==
=== High Schools ===
- Tascosa High School
- AmTech Career Academy
- North Heights Alternative School

=== Middle Schools ===
- Stephen F. Austin Middle School
- Lorenzo De Zavala Middle School
- Sam Houston Middle School
- Crockett Middle School

=== Elementary Schools ===
- Avondale Elementary School
- Bivins Elementary School
- Margeret Wills Elementary School
- San Jacinto Elementary School
- George Washington Carver Elementary Academy
- Paramount Terrace Elementary School
- Wolflin Elementary School
- Coronado Elementary School
- Forest Hill Elementary

=== Early Childhood ===
- George Washington Carver Early Childhood Academy

== Notable alumni ==
- Melinda Bordelon - Paint and illustrator
- Gail Caldwell - Chief book critic for The Boston Globe from 1985 to 2009 and Author
- Paul Lockhart - Aerospace engineer, retired United States Air Force colonel and NASA astronaut
- Walter Thomas Price, IV - Politician
- Brent Scott - Retired United States Navy rear admiral and chaplain
- Keith Self - Politician
- Francie Swift - Actress

=== Athletes ===
- Tucker Davidson - Professional baseball pitcher in the Baltimore Orioles organization
- Alex O'Brien - Former doubles world No. 1 tennis player
- Brandon Slay - Former freestyle wrestler
- Shahada Wells - Basketball player

=== Musicians ===
- Kevin Fowler - Singer-songwriter
- JD Souther - Singer, songwriter, and actor
- Terry Stafford, singer/songwriter, sang the #1 hit "Suspicion" in 1964
- Jim Wilson - recording artist and piano technician
