= Riesel High School =

Location
- 600 Frederick Street; Riesel, Texas 76682; United States; 31.477173°N 96.914595°W

Information
- School type: Public high school
- School district: Riesel Independent School District
- Superintendent: Brandon Cope
- Principal: Stacey Dieterich
- Staff: 27.59 (FTE)
- Grades: 7-12
- Enrollment: 330 (2023–2024)
- Student to teacher ratio: 10.76
- Colors: Maroon & White
- Athletics conference: UIL Class AA
- Mascot: Ug the indian
- Website: Riesel High School

Riesel High School is a public high school located in Riesel, Texas (USA) and classified as a 2A school by the UIL. It is part of the Riesel Independent School District located in southeastern McLennan County. In 2015, the school was rated "Met Standard" by the Texas Education Agency.

== Athletics ==
The Riesel Indians compete in these sports -

- Baseball
- Basketball
- Cross Country
- Football
- Golf
- Powerlifting
- Softball
- Track and Field
- Volleyball

=== State ===
State Qualifiers

2022-Varsity Cross Country Boys-Cade Ehlers, Aiden Summers, Jason Chavez, Luke Teter, Robert Thomas, Micheal Martinez, and Nathan Shaw.

2024-Varsity Cross Country Boys-Travis McLellan, Jacob Shaw, Jason Chavez, Leoncio Moreno, Julian Martinez, and Matthew Hawkins.

2025-Varsity Cross Country Boys and Girls-Addison Cope, Travis McLellan, Jacob Shaw, Jason Chavez, Leoncio Moreno, Jemeraah Huges,Nickolas Cardona, and Matthew Hawkins

2025-Varsity Softball-Sveva Mariotti, Kaelyn Price, Addison Cope, Mollee Summers, Kennedy Guardiola, Landri Pick, Camdyn Benton, Lina Schmidt, Raizel Chaparro, Lauren Summers, and Kyleigh Benton.

=== Rivalries ===
Riesel fans and residents have long enjoyed a strong rivalry with the neighboring Mart Panthers, a campus located less than ten miles away on F.M. 1860.

== Activities ==
Riesel offers the following extra-curricular activities - Cheerleading, Athletics, Cooking, Dance, FFA, One Act Play, Fishing, Life Skills, Spanish Club, and Band.
