= Lorena High School =

Coordinates: 31.3877°N 97.2227°W

Location
- 1 Leopard Ln. Lorena, Texas 76655-3433; United States

Information
- School type: Public high school
- School district: Lorena Independent School District
- Principal: Matt Rambo
- Teaching staff: 46.73 (FTE)
- Grades: 9-12
- Enrollment: 553 (2023–2024)
- Student to teacher ratio: 11.83
- Colors: Red, black, and white
- Athletics conference: UIL Class AAA
- Mascot: Leopard
- Yearbook: Leopard
- Website: Lorena High School

Lorena High School is a public high school in Lorena, Texas (USA), classified as a 4A school by the UIL. It is part of the Lorena Independent School District located in south central McLennan County. In 2015, the school was rated "Met Standard" by the Texas Education Agency.

== Athletics ==
The Lorena Leopards compete in these sports -

Cross Country, Volleyball, Football, Basketball, Powerlifting, Swimming, Soccer, Golf, Tennis, Track, Softball & Baseball

=== State titles ===
- Baseball -
  - 2003(3A)
- Football -
  - 1987(2A), 2021(3A/D1)

==== State finalist ====
- Football -
  - 1989(2A)
