= Midway High School =

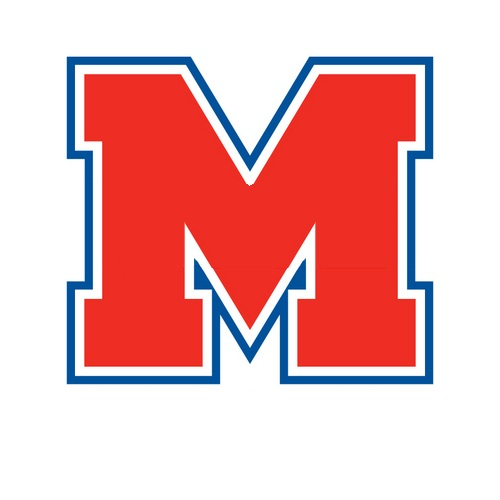

Location
- 8200 Mars Drive; Waco, Texas 76712-6575; United States; 31.484008°N 97.199053°W

Information
- School type: Public high school
- School district: Midway ISD
- Principal: Alison Smith
- Staff: 176.13 (FTE)
- Grades: 9-12
- Enrollment: 2,730 (2023–2024)
- Student to teacher ratio: 15.50
- Colors: Red, white, and blue
- Athletics conference: UIL Class 6A
- Mascot: Panther
- Website: Midway High School

Midway High School is a public high school located in the city of Waco, Texas, USA, and classified as a 6A school by the University Interscholastic League (UIL). It is part of the Midway Independent School District, which serves the Waco, Texas area. Although the school is located in southwestern Waco, most students live in the suburbs of Woodway and Hewitt. The school was formerly located in Hewitt until the fall of 2003, when the current high school was built a half-mile away. The previous building is now Midway Middle School. The school was named the number one Best Public High School in McLennan County in 2026 by Niche. It was also rated "Met Standard" by the Texas Education Agency in 2015 and 2016, with students ranking in the top 25% for student progress, closing performance gaps, and postsecondary readiness.

== Demographics ==
The ethnic breakdown of Midway ISD is approximately 57% White/ Anglo, 23.4% Hispanic, 11.9% African American, 4.6% Asian, 0.2% American Indian/ Alaska Native, 0.2% Hawaiian/Pacific Islander and 2/6% two or more ethnicities.

== Athletics ==
The Midway Panthers and Pantherettes compete in these sports:

- Baseball
- Basketball
- Cross Country
- Football
- Golf
- Marching Band
- Powerlifting
- Soccer
- Softball
- Swimming
- Tennis
- Track and Field
- Volleyball
- Water polo (club)
- Cheerleading

=== State titles ===
- Baseball -
  - 2003(4A), 2025(6A/D1)
- Girls Basketball -
  - 1955(B), 1969(2A), 1973(2A), 1975(3A), 1976(3A), 1994(4A), 2009(4A)
- Girls Cross Country -
  - 1982 (4A)
- Boys Soccer -
  - 2002(4A)
- Softball -
  - 1998(4A), 2010(4A), 2025(6A/D1)
- Tennis
  - Girls Singles - 2011 (4A)
  - Boys Doubles - 1982(4A), 1987(4A)
  - Boys Singles - 1992(4A)
  - Mixed Doubles - 2010(4A)
- Girls Track -
  - 1975(3A)
- Volleyball -
  - 2007(4A)

== Notable programs ==
Midway added a robotics program in 2010 and an astronomy club in 2011. The Midway ISD Education Foundation provided a portable, inflatable planetarium for these clubs as well as FFA and agricultural studies.

The speech and debate teams have been nationally competitive since the 1980s-90s, and have consistently qualified for the National Forensic League tournament. The clubs have won the following state championships:

- Lincoln-Douglas Debate (1995)
- Policy debate (1993, 1995, 1996, 2000)
- Informative speaking (1993)
- Persuasive speaking (1964, 1965, 1993)

The orchestra program received international recognition in 2012 at the Midwest Clinic in Chicago, Ill. They were named a national finalist for the American Prize in Orchestra Performance, placing second.

The school has Marine Corps Junior Reserve Officer Training Corps (MCJROTC) established in the early 1980s.

== MCJROTC Awards And Recognitons ==
Naval Honor School recognition

The program regularly secures major ROTC scholarships. Recent highlights include cadets earning full-ride Navy ROTC scholarships and high-value university awards

The Panther Company has earned the prestigious Naval Honor School designation (placing it in the top 20% of programs nationwide) and the Bronze Patrick Henry Award from the Military Order of the World Wars. May 20, 2025

== Lone Star Cup ==
In 2012, Midway ranked in the top 10 of UIL's Lone Star Cup Class 4A rankings for the fifth year in a row, before moving to 5A in the 2012–13 school year. The Texas Lone Star Cup is awarded based on a school district's combined academic and athletic achievements.

In addition to strong athletics and academics, Midway was named "One of the Best Communities for Music Education" by the NAMM Foundation four straight years.

== Midway High on television ==
Midway was the setting of the 2006 teen drama reality series Texas Cheer Moms on The Learning Channel.

== Other recognition ==
The school was named the number one Best Public High School in McLennan County in 2026 by Niche. It was also rated "Met Standard" by the Texas Education Agency in 2015 and 2016.

== Notable alumni ==
- Andy Hawkins (class of 1978) — baseball pitcher, MLB
- Shawn Achor (class of 1996) — author
- Brian Barkley — baseball pitcher, MLB
- Christian Davis – football player, SMU Mustangs
- Ahmad Dixon (class of 2010) – football player, Baylor Bears, NFL
- Zach Duke (class of 2001) — baseball pitcher, MLB
- Casey Fossum (class of 96) — baseball pitcher, MLB
- Ryan Harlan — decathlete
- KT Leveston (class of 2018) — football player, NFL
- Tanner Mordecai (class of 2018) — football player, Wisconsin Badgers, San Francisco 49ers
- Tre Tomlinson — football player, TCU Horned Frogs, LA Rams
- Kramer Robertson — baseball shortstop, MLB
- JoJo Ward — football player
- Aaron Wilkerson (class of 2007) — baseball pitcher, MLB
