= Halberg =

Halberg may refer to:

== People ==
- Chuck Halberg (born 1942), American lawyer and politician
- Franz Halberg (1919–2013), American-Romanian scientist and one of the founders of modern chronobiology
- Jonny Halberg (born 1962), Norwegian author and dramatist
- Murray Halberg (born 1933), New Zealand middle-distance runner
- Gus Hall (birth name Arvo Kustaa Halberg) (1910-2000) American Communist Party leader

== Places ==
- Halberg Castle, German castle near Saarbrücken

== Other uses ==
- Halberg Awards, which recognise New Zealand's top sporting achievements
- Stadion am Halberg, a stadium in Taunusstein, Germany

== See also ==
- Hallberg, a surname
- Halleberg, a mountain in Vänersborg, Västergötland, Sweden
- Hallsberg, Hallsberg Municipality, Örebro, Sweden
- Hallsburg, Texas, city, U.S.
- Castle Hallberg, German castle complex in the community of Fußgönheim in Rhineland-Palatinate
