= 2023 Little League Softball World Series qualification =

Children's softball competition qualification

There were twelve Little League softball regional tournaments to qualify for the 2023 Little League Softball World Series in Greenville, North Carolina which took place between June 15 and July 31, 2023.

== Qualified Teams ==
Region	Location	Little League
Asia-Pacific	Bacolod, Philippines	Negros Occidental Little League
Canada	(Canada) St. Albert, Alberta	St. Albert Softball Little League
Central	Austintown, Ohio	Austintown Little League
Europe-Africa	Milan, Italy	Lombardia Little League
Host (North Carolina)	Salisbury, North Carolina	Rowan Little League
Latin America	Guayama, Puerto Rico	Guayama Softball Little League
Mid-Atlantic	(New York (state)) Massapequa, New York	Massapequa International Little League
New England	Milford, Connecticut	Milford Little League
Northwest	Bend, Oregon	Bend North Little League
Southeast	Winterville, North Carolina	Pitt County Girls Softball Little League
Southwest	Hewitt, Texas	Midway Little League
West	San Jose, California	Almaden Little League

== United States tournaments ==
=== Central region ===
The tournament occurred in Whitestown, Indiana from July 23–28, 2023.

State	Location	Little League
Illinois	Brookfield	Brookfield National Little League
Indiana	Zionsville	Zionsville Little League
Iowa	Johnston	Johnston Girls Softball Little League
Kentucky	Crestwood	South Oldham Little League
Michigan	St. Clair	St. Clair Little League
Missouri	Columbia	Daniel Boone Little League
Nebraska	Omaha	Keystone Little League
Ohio	Austintown	Austintown Little League
Wisconsin	Appleton	Appleton Little League

==== Winner's Bracket ====
First Round
Wisconsin	4
Nebraska	8

Quarterfinals
Indiana	3
Nebraska	0
Kentucky	4
Illinois	7
Missouri	3
Michigan	2
Ohio	3
Iowa	8

Semifinals
Indiana	12
Illinois	4
Missouri	8
Iowa	12

Winner's Bracket Final
Indiana	1
Iowa	8

==== Elimination Bracket ====
First Round
Wisconsin	2
Ohio	4

Second Round
Kentucky	2
Nebraska	4
Michigan	1
Ohio	5

Quarterfinal
Missouri	3
Nebraska	1
Illinois	3
Ohio	4

Semifinal #1
Missouri	1
Ohio	10

=== Host region (North Carolina) ===
The North Carolina state tournament took place in Greenville, North Carolina from July 7–11. The winner of the North Carolina state tournament advanced to the Little League Softball World Series representing the Host Region. The winner of the elimination bracket advanced to the Southeast region tournament as the North Carolina Representative.

Location	Little League
Charlotte	Mallard Creek Little League
Winterville	Pitt County Girls Softball Little League
Salisbury	Rowan Little League
Durham	South Durham Little League
Brevard	Transylvania Little League

==== Winner's bracket ====
First Round
(North Carolina) Mallard Creek	12
(North Carolina) Transylvania	3

Semifinals
(North Carolina) Pitt County	1
(North Carolina) Mallard Creek	3
(North Carolina) South Durham	0
(North Carolina) Rowan	12

Championship Game
(North Carolina) Mallard Creek	1
(North Carolina) Rowan	2

==== Elimination Bracket ====
First Round
(North Carolina) Transylvania	0
(North Carolina) South Durham	8

Semifinal
(North Carolina) South Durham	0
(North Carolina) Pitt County	7

Bracket Final
(North Carolina) Pitt County	5
(North Carolina) Mallard Creek	4

=== Mid-Atlantic region ===
The tournament took place in Bristol, Connecticut from July 23–28.

State	Location	Little League
Delaware	Georgetown	Georgetown Little League
Maryland	Delmar	Delmar Little League
New Jersey	Toms River	Toms River Little League
(New York (state)) New York	Massapequa	Massapequa International Little League
Pennsylvania	Moscow	North Pocono/Dandy Lion Little League
(Washington, D.C.) Washington, D.C.	Washington, D.C.	Capitol City Little League

==== Bracket ====
Winner's First Round
(Washington, D.C.) Washington, D.C.	0
New Jersey	17
(New York (state)) New York	1
Pennsylvania	0
Elimination First Round
(Washington, D.C.) Washington, D.C.	0
Delaware	18
Pennsylvania	3
Maryland	0

Winner's Semifinal
New Jersey	10
Maryland	0
Delaware	2
(New York (state)) New York	5
Elimination Semifinal
Delaware	1
Pennsylvania	2

Winner's Bracket Final
New Jersey	0
(New York (state)) New York	6
Elimination Bracket Final
New Jersey	0
Pennsylvania	8

Championship Game
(New York (state)) New York	7
Pennsylvania	0

=== New England region ===
The tournament took place in Bristol, Connecticut from July 23–28.

State	Location	Little League
Connecticut	Milford	Milford Little League
Maine	Buxton	Bonny Eagle Little League
Massachusetts	Worcester	Jesse Burkett Little League
Rhode Island	Cranston	Cranston Western Little League
Vermont	St. Albans	St. Albans Little League

==== Bracket ====
Winner's First Round
Vermont	10
Maine	1
Elimination First Round
Maine	16
Massachusetts	2

Winner's Semifinal
Vermont	1
Connecticut	11
Massachusetts	5
Rhode Island	10
Elimination Semifinal
Vermont	1
(Pennsylvania) Maine	2

Winner's Bracket Final
(New York (state)) Connecticut	13
Rhode Island	1
Elimination Bracket Final
Rhode Island	0
Maine	5

Championship Game
Connecticut	11
Maine	1

=== Northwest region ===
The tournament took place in San Bernardino, California from July 22–28.

State	Location	Little League
Alaska	Juneau	Gastineau Channel Little League
Idaho	Lewiston	Lewiston Little League
Montana	Billings	Boulder Arrowhead Little League
Oregon	Bend	Bend North Little League
(Washington (state)) Washington	Puyallup	South Hill Little League
Wyoming	Gillette	Gillette Little League

==== Bracket ====
Winner's First Round
Alaska	1
Oregon	9
Montana	6
Wyoming	0
Elimination First Round
Alaska	6
(Washington (state)) Washington	13
Wyoming	12
Idaho	1

Winner's Semifinal
Oregon	10
Idaho	0
(Washington (state)) Washington	10
Montana	15
Elimination Semifinal
(Washington (state)) Washington	9
Wyoming	6

Winner's Bracket Final
Oregon	2
Montana	7
Elimination Bracket Final
Oregon	7
(Washington (state)) Washington	6

Championship Game
Montana	4
Oregon	8

=== Southeast Region ===
The tournament took place in Warner Robins, Georgia from July 24–28.

State	Location	Little League
Florida	Niceville	Niceville Valparaiso Little League
(Georgia (U.S. state)) Georgia	Warner Robins	Warner Robins American Little League
North Carolina	Winterville	Pitt County Girls Softball Little League
South Carolina	Columbia	Trenholm Little League
Tennessee	Erwin	Unicoi County Little League
Virginia	McLean	McLean Softball Little League
West Virginia	Logan	Logan Little League

==== Bracket ====
Winner's First Round	Winner's Second Round	Winner's Bracket Final	Championship Game
(Georgia (U.S. state)) Georgia	2
North Carolina	10
North Carolina	8
Florida	2
North Carolina	13
Tennessee	1
Virginia	17
South Carolina	1
Virginia	0
Tennessee	5
Tennessee	3
West Virginia	1
North Carolina	3
Tennessee	0
Elimination First Round	Elimination Second Round	Elimination Semifinal	Elimination Bracket Final
(Georgia (U.S. state)) Georgia	6
South Carolina	1	West Virginia	0	Tennessee	7
West Virginia	11	(Georgia (U.S. state)) Georgia	4	Florida	6
Florida	5
Florida	11
Virginia	1

=== Southwest region ===
The tournament took place in Waco, Texas from July 24–27.

State	Location	Little League
Colorado	Monument	Tri Lakes Little League
Louisiana	Sterlington	Sterlington Little League
New Mexico	Carlsbad	Carlsbad National Little League
Texas East	Inez	Industrial Little League
Texas West	Hewitt	Midway Little League

==== Bracket ====
Winner's First Round
Texas East	0
Texas West	3
Elimination First Round
Texas East	8
Colorado	1

Winner's Semifinal
Texas West	4
New Mexico	1
Colorado	0
Louisiana	13
Elimination Semifinal
New Mexico	2
Texas East	10

Winner's Bracket Final
Texas West	10
Louisiana	0
Elimination Bracket Final
Louisiana	2
Texas East	6

Championship Game
Texas West	6
Texas East	0

=== West region ===
The tournament took place in San Bernardino, California from July 22–28.

State	Location	Little League
Arizona	Willcox	Willcox Little League
Hawaii	Hilo	Hilo Little League
Nevada	Sparks	Centennial Little League
Northern California	San Jose	Almaden Little League
Southern California	Quartz Hill	Quartz Hill Little League
Utah	Enterprise	Enterprise Little League

==== Bracket ====
Winner's First Round
Nevada	6
Utah	3
Southern California	10
Hawaii	3
Elimination First Round
Utah	4
Northern California	5
Hawaii	7
Nevada	13

Winner's Semifinal
Nevada	0
Arizona	8
Northern California	4
Southern California	11
Elimination Semifinal
Northern California	9
Nevada	1

Winner's Bracket Final
Arizona	1
Southern California	2
Elimination Bracket Final
Arizona	4
Northern California	8

Championship Game
Southern California	1
Northern California	2

== International ==
=== Asia-Pacific region ===
There was no Asia-Pacific tournament in 2023, and the regional championship was awarded to Negros Occidental Little League of Bacolod, Philippines.

=== Canada region ===
The tournament took place in Victoria, British Columbia from July 29–31.

Teams
Province	Location	Little League	Record
Alberta	St. Albert	St. Albert Softball Little League	2-0
Quebec	Montreal	On Fields LLS Little League	1-1
British Columbia	Victoria	Hampton Little League	0-2

Semifinal			Final
			2	Quebec	2
3	British Columbia	1	1	Alberta	4
2	Quebec	3

=== Europe-Africa region ===
The tournament took place in Chomutov, Czech Republic from July 5–9.

Teams
Country	City	Little League	Record
Italy	Milan	Lombardia Little League	2-1
Czech Republic A	Prague	Bohemia Little League	2-1
Czech Republic B	Prague	Prague Little League	2-1
Netherlands	Haarlem	Kennermerland Little League	0-3

==== Semifinal & final ====
Semifinals
1	Italy	12
4	Netherlands	2
2	Czech Republic A	12
3	Czech Republic B	2

Finals
1	Italy	6
2	Czech Republic A	3

=== Latin America region ===
The tournament took place in Guayama, Puerto Rico from June 15–19.

Teams
Country	City	Little League	Record
Puerto Rico	Guayama	Guayama Softball Little League	4-0
Mexico	Monterrey	Monterrey Little League	2-2
Curaçao	Willemstad	Curaçao Little League	2-2
Puerto Rico	Guánica	Guánica Little League	1-3
United States Virgin Islands	Christiansted	McHen Little League	0-4

==== Championship game ====
Finals
1	Puerto Rico	3
2	Mexico	2
