= Willow Grove, Texas =

- Census-designated place
- Location within Texas Location within the United States
- Coordinates: 31°33′33″N 97°17′46″W
- Country: United States
- State: Texas
- County: McLennan

Area
  - Total: 5.2 sq mi (13.4 km^{2})
  - Land: 5.2 sq mi (13.4 km^{2})
  - Water: 0 sq mi (0.0 km^{2})
- Elevation: 551 ft (168 m)
- Time zone: UTC-6 (Central (CST))
  - Summer (DST): UTC-5 (CDT)
- ZIP Code: 76712 (Woodway)
- Area code: 254
- FIPS code: 48-79456
- GNIS feature ID: 2805809

Willow Grove is an unincorporated area and census-designated place (CDP) in McLennan County, Texas, United States. It was first listed as a CDP prior to the 2020 census. As of the 2020 census, Willow Grove had a population of 2,082.

It is in the central part of the county, on the southwest side of Texas State Highway 6. It is 6 miles (10 km) northwest of Woodway and 11 miles (18 km) west of downtown Waco.

== Demographics ==
Historical population
Census	Pop.	Note	%±
2020	2,082		—
U.S. Decennial Census; 1850–1900 1910; 1920 1930 1940; 1950 1960 1970; 1980 1990 2000; 2010

first appeared as a census designated place in the 2020 U.S. census.

=== 2020 Census ===
Willow Grove CDP, Texas – Racial and ethnic composition Note: the US Census treats Hispanic/Latino as an ethnic category. This table excludes Latinos from the racial categories and assigns them to a separate category. Hispanics/Latinos may be of any race.
Race / Ethnicity (NH = Non-Hispanic)	Pop 2020	% 2020
White alone (NH)	1,541	74.02%
Black or African American alone (NH)	41	1.97%
Native American or Alaska Native alone (NH)	10	0.48%
Asian alone (NH)	9	0.43%
Native Hawaiian or Pacific Islander alone (NH)	2	0.10%
Other race alone (NH)	3	0.14%
Mixed race or Multiracial (NH)	82	3.94%
Hispanic or Latino (any race)	394	18.92%
Total	2,082	100.00%

== Education ==
It is in the Midway Independent School District.

All of McLennan County is in the service area of McLennan Community College.
