= Hallberg =

Hallberg or Hållberg is a Swedish surname. Notable people with the surname include:

- Anders Hallberg (born 1945), Swedish chemist
- Axel Hallberg (born 1999), Swedish politician
- Bengt Hallberg (1932–2013), Swedish jazz musician
- Bob Hallberg (1944–2019), American basketball coach
- David Hallberg, American ballet dancer
- Ernst Hallberg (1894–1944), Swedish equestrian
- Garth Risk Hallberg (born 1978), American author
- Gary Hallberg (born 1958), American golfer
- Gösta Hallberg (1891–1978), Swedish high jumper
- Jonas Hallberg (1944–2025), Swedish journalist and television presenter
- Knut Hallberg, Swedish football manager
- Mark Hallberg (born 1985), American baseball coach
- Melker Hallberg (born 1995), Swedish footballer
- Nils Hallberg (1921–2010), Swedish actor
- Olle Hallberg (1903–1996), Swedish track athlete
- Per Hallberg (born 1958), Swedish sound editor
- Per Hållberg (born 1978), Swedish ice hockey player
- Sture Hållberg (1917–1988), Swedish boxer

== See also ==
- C. G. Hallberg, Swedish goldsmith, jeweler business
- Halberg (disambiguation)
- Hallsberg
- Hallsburg
