= McLennan County, Texas =

County in Texas, United States

- County
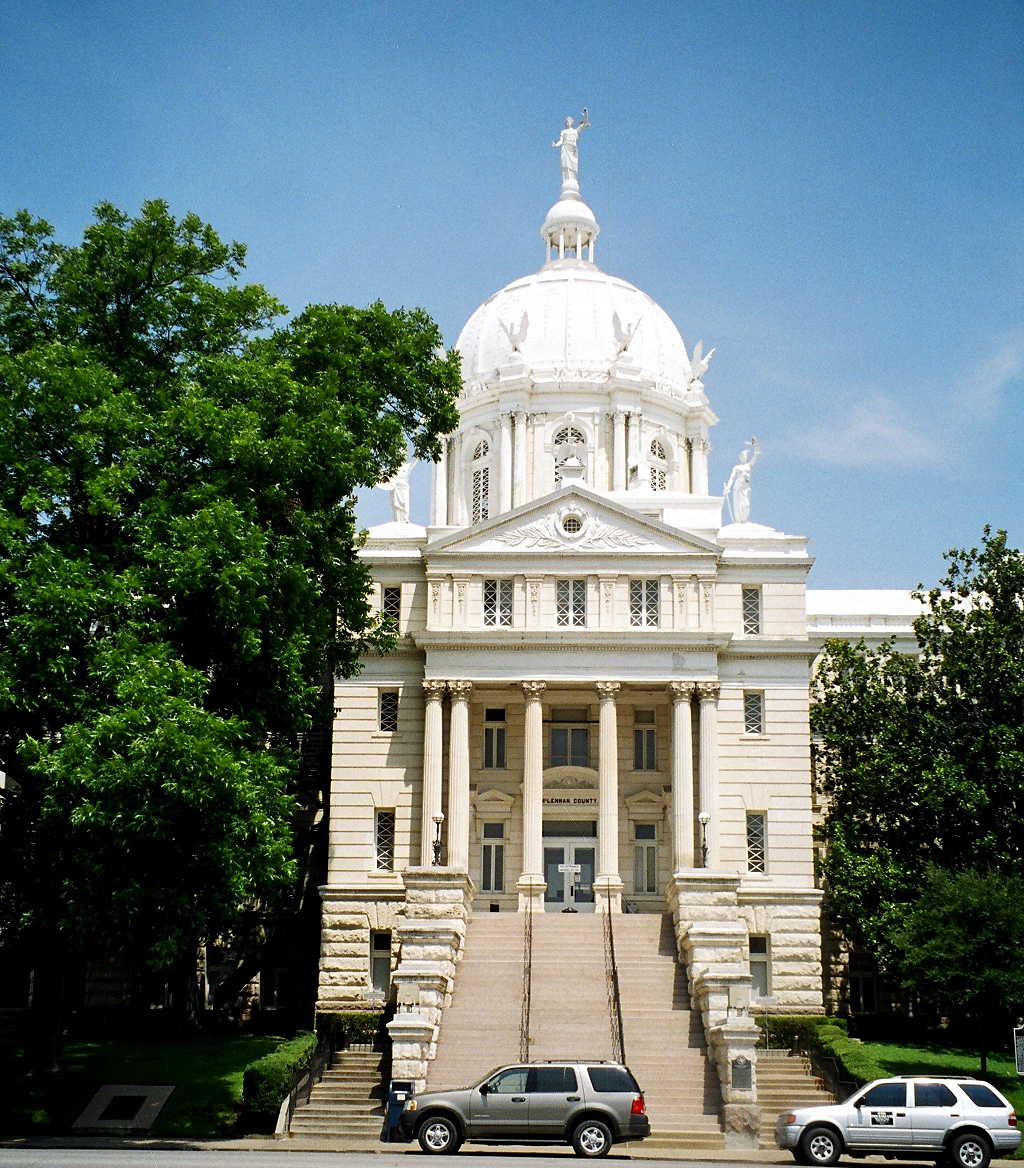
- The McLennan County Courthouse in Waco

- Flag

- Location within the U.S. state of Texas
- Coordinates: 31°33′N 97°12′W
- Country: United States
- State: Texas
- Founded: 1850
- Named for: Neil McLennan
- Seat: Waco
- Largest city: Waco

Area
  - Total: 1,060 sq mi (2,700 km^{2})
  - Land: 1,037 sq mi (2,690 km^{2})
  - Water: 23 sq mi (60 km^{2}) 2.2%

Population (2020)
  - Total: 260,579
  - Estimate (2025): 272,020 ▲
  - Density: 251.3/sq mi (97.02/km^{2})
- Time zone: UTC−6 (Central)
  - Summer (DST): UTC−5 (CDT)
- Congressional district: 17th
- Website: www.mclennan.gov

McLennan County is a county located on the Edwards Plateau in Central Texas. As of the 2020 census, its population was 260,579. Its county seat and largest city is Waco. The U.S. census 2025 county population estimate is 272,020. The county is named for Neil McLennan, an early Scottish settler in frontier Texas. McLennan County is included in the Waco Metropolitan Statistical Area.

== History ==
McLennan County was created by the Texas Legislature in 1850 out of Milam County. The county seat, Waco, had been founded as an outpost of the Texas Rangers. It was laid out by George B. Erath, and was known by 1850 as Waco Village.

In the 1880s, pharmacist Charles Alderton developed the carbonated beverage that became known as Dr Pepper. The Dr Pepper business was headquartered in Waco, until it moved to Dallas, Texas. Waco is also home to the Dr Pepper Museum, housed in the 1906 building that was the first stand-alone facility used to bottle Dr Pepper.

According to local lore, the first sustained flight did not occur in Kitty Hawk, North Carolina, but just outside Tokio (a small community in McLennan County) by a man flying a gyrocopter. During World War I, McLennan County was home to at least one military airfield, Rich Field. In the aftermath of World War I, when social tensions were high as veterans returned, white racial violence broke out against blacks. The county had 15 lynchings, the second-highest number of any county in the state.

McLennan County's contributions to World War II include the reopening of Rich Field for use by the Air Force, and the opening of James Connally Air Force Base. The latter is now used as the TSTC Waco Airport and Texas State Technical College. County resident Doris Miller was awarded the Navy Cross for his heroism at Pearl Harbor; he was the first African American to earn such distinction. Local man James Connally became known as a World War II fighter pilot.

=== County Courthouse ===
The current County Courthouse, the fourth to be built, is located in Waco. Completed in 1902 in the Beaux-Arts style, it is the next-to-last example of architect James Riely Gordon's Texas courthouses. The building contractor was Tom Lovell. The first county courthouse was completed in 1851 for $500, and was a two-story log cabin that was 30' x 30'. McLennan's second courthouse was a two-story brick building completed in 1857 for $11,000. The third courthouse was styled after Second Empire by architect W.C. Dodson, and completed in 1877 at a cost of $24,894.50.

=== Institutions of higher education ===
In 1886, Baylor University relocated from Independence, Texas, to Waco and absorbed Waco University. During the early 20th century, McLennan County was home to as many as five colleges. In addition to Baylor, the other colleges included the predecessor to what is now known as Texas Christian University (now in Fort Worth), Paul Quinn College (relocated since to Dallas), and two other short-lived colleges.

In the 1960s, the Texas Legislature authorized McLennan Community College, the first community college to use those words in the name. Around the same time, what is now the flagship institution of Texas State Technical College was founded as James Connally Technical Institute, as a member of the Texas A&M University System. Today, Baylor, McLennan Community College, and Texas State Technical College continue to operate in McLennan County. They educate a large portion of the college-bound high-school graduates from the county and the surrounding areas. McLennan Community College has also partnered with Tarleton State University, Texas Tech University, University of Texas Medical Branch in Galveston, and Midwestern State University to offer more than 50 bachelor's or master's degrees.

=== 1896 Crash at Crush ===
Crush, Texas, was a temporary "city" in McLennan County, about 15 miles (24 km) north of Waco. It was established to stage a publicity stunt concocted by William George Crush and the Missouri-Kansas-Texas Railroad. The stunt involved the collision of two 35-ton steam locomotives in front of spectators, whom the railway transported to the event for $2 each. After strong promotion, on September 15, 1896, the event was delayed by an hour as the police maneuvered the crowd of more than 40,000 back to what was thought to be a safe distance.

The crews of the two engines tied the throttles open and jumped off. The two engines, pulling wagons filled with railroad ties, traveled a 4-mile (6.4 km) track and thunderously crashed into each other at a combined speed up to 120 mph (190 km/h). The boilers exploded and sent steam and flying debris into the crowd. Three people were killed and about six were injured, including event photographer Jarvis "Joe" Deane, who lost an eye because of a flying bolt.

Ragtime composer Scott Joplin commemorated the event with "The Great Crush Collision March"; Joplin dedicated the composition to the Missouri-Kansas-Texas Railway. Texas composer and singer Brian Burns wrote and recorded a song about the collision, "The Crash at Crush" (2001).

=== Twin Peaks biker shootout ===
On May 17, 2015, motorcycle clubs gathered at the Twin Peaks Restaurant in Waco for a Confederation of Clubs meeting. Upon arrival of a large contingent of the Bandidos Motorcycle Club, mass violence erupted in the parking lot of Twin Peaks between members of the Bandidos and members of the Cossasks Motorcycle Club. This resulted in nine dead and 18 wounded in the melee between the rival outlaw motorcycle gangs. In 2019, all remaining charges were dropped by the new District Attorney, Barry Johnson.

== Geography ==
According to the U.S. Census Bureau, the county has a total area of 1,060 square miles (2,700 km^{2}), of which 1,037 square miles (2,690 km^{2}) are land and 23 square miles (60 km^{2}) (2.2%) are covered by water.

=== Major highways ===
- Interstate 35
- U.S. Highway 77
- U.S. Highway 84
- State Highway 6
- State Highway 7
- State Highway 31
- State Highway 164
- State Highway 317
- Loop 2
- Loop 340
- Loop 396
- Loop 484
- Loop 574
- Spur 298
- Spur 299
- Spur 412

=== Adjacent counties ===
- Hill County (north)
- Limestone County (east)
- Falls County (southeast)
- Bell County (south)
- Coryell County (southwest)
- Bosque County (northwest)

== Demographics ==
Historical population
| Census | Pop. | Note | %± |
|---|---|---|---|
| 1860 | 6,206 | | — |
| 1870 | 13,500 | | 117.5% |
| 1880 | 26,934 | | 99.5% |
| 1890 | 39,204 | | 45.6% |
| 1900 | 59,772 | | 52.5% |
| 1910 | 73,250 | | 22.5% |
| 1920 | 82,921 | | 13.2% |
| 1930 | 98,682 | | 19.0% |
| 1940 | 101,898 | | 3.3% |
| 1950 | 130,194 | | 27.8% |
| 1960 | 150,091 | | 15.3% |
| 1970 | 147,553 | | −1.7% |
| 1980 | 170,755 | | 15.7% |
| 1990 | 189,123 | | 10.8% |
| 2000 | 213,517 | | 12.9% |
| 2010 | 234,906 | | 10.0% |
| 2020 | 260,579 | | 10.9% |
| 2025 (est.) | 272,020 | ▲ | 4.4% |
U.S. Decennial Census; 1850–2010 2020

=== Racial and ethnic composition ===
McLennan County, Texas – Racial and ethnic composition Note: the US Census treats Hispanic/Latino as an ethnic category. This table excludes Latinos from the racial categories and assigns them to a separate category. Hispanics/Latinos may be of any race.
| Race / Ethnicity (NH = Non-Hispanic) | Pop 1980 | Pop 1990 | Pop 2000 | Pop 2010 | Pop 2020 | % 1980 | % 1990 | % 2000 | % 2010 | % 2020 |
|---|---|---|---|---|---|---|---|---|---|---|
| White alone (NH) | 127,585 | 134,507 | 138,008 | 138,295 | 139,693 | 74.72% | 71.12% | 64.64% | 58.87% | 53.61% |
| Black or African American alone (NH) | 27,068 | 29,036 | 32,065 | 33,892 | 36,130 | 15.85% | 15.35% | 15.02% | 14.43% | 13.87% |
| Native American or Alaska Native alone (NH) | 305 | 472 | 666 | 704 | 901 | 0.18% | 0.25% | 0.31% | 0.30% | 0.35% |
| Asian alone (NH) | 552 | 1,323 | 2,236 | 3,128 | 4,873 | 0.32% | 0.70% | 1.05% | 1.33% | 1.87% |
| Native Hawaiian or Pacific Islander alone (NH) | x | x | 77 | 84 | 146 | x | x | 0.04% | 0.04% | 0.06% |
| Other race alone (NH) | 257 | 142 | 147 | 235 | 1,065 | 0.15% | 0.08% | 0.07% | 0.10% | 0.41% |
| Mixed race or Multiracial (NH) | x | x | 2,085 | 3,097 | 9,184 | x | x | 0.98% | 1.32% | 3.52% |
| Hispanic or Latino (any race) | 14,988 | 23,643 | 38,233 | 55,471 | 68,587 | 8.78% | 12.50% | 17.91% | 23.61% | 26.32% |
| Total | 170,755 | 189,123 | 213,517 | 234,906 | 260,579 | 100.00% | 100.00% | 100.00% | 100.00% | 100.00% |

=== 2020 census ===
As of the 2020 census, the county had a population of 260,579 and a median age of 34.8 years. 24.2% of residents were under the age of 18 and 15.4% of residents were 65 years of age or older. For every 100 females there were 94.2 males, and for every 100 females age 18 and over there were 91.0 males age 18 and over.

The Census Bureau's QuickFacts reports the population density was 205 per square mile, the median household income was $53,723, the per capita income was $28,421, about 14.7% of residents lived below the poverty line, and the most common ancestries were German (12.8%), American (11.0%), English (8.0%), and Irish (6.9%).

As of the 2020 census, the racial makeup of the county was 60.0% White, 14.4% Black or African American, 1.0% American Indian and Alaska Native, 1.9% Asian, 0.1% Native Hawaiian and Pacific Islander, 10.8% from some other race, and 11.8% from two or more races. Hispanic or Latino residents of any race comprised 26.3% of the population.

As of the 2020 census, 76.0% of residents lived in urban areas, while 24.0% lived in rural areas.

There were 96,527 households in the county, of which 32.7% had children under the age of 18 living in them. Of all households, 45.0% were married-couple households, 18.8% were households with a male householder and no spouse or partner present, and 30.1% were households with a female householder and no spouse or partner present. About 26.9% of all households were made up of individuals and 10.0% had someone living alone who was 65 years of age or older.

There were 105,817 housing units, of which 8.8% were vacant. Among occupied housing units, 58.5% were owner-occupied and 41.5% were renter-occupied. The homeowner vacancy rate was 1.8% and the rental vacancy rate was 8.9%.

The 2020 census heat map showed that an estimated 1.3% of partnered households in the county were in same-sex relationships, though the figure may be undercounted.

== Communities ==
=== Cities (multiple counties) ===
- Bruceville-Eddy (small part in Falls County)
- Golinda (mostly in Falls County)
- Mart (small part in Limestone County)
- McGregor (small part in Coryell County)
- Valley Mills (mostly in Bosque County)

=== Cities ===
- Bellmead
- Beverly Hills
- Crawford
- Gholson
- Hallsburg
- Hewitt
- Lacy Lakeview
- Leroy
- Lorena
- Moody
- Riesel
- Robinson
- Ross
- Waco (county seat)
- West
- Woodway

=== Census-designated place ===
- China Spring
- Willow Grove

=== Unincorporated communities ===
- Axtell
- Elm Mott
- Ocee
- Speegleville

== Economy ==
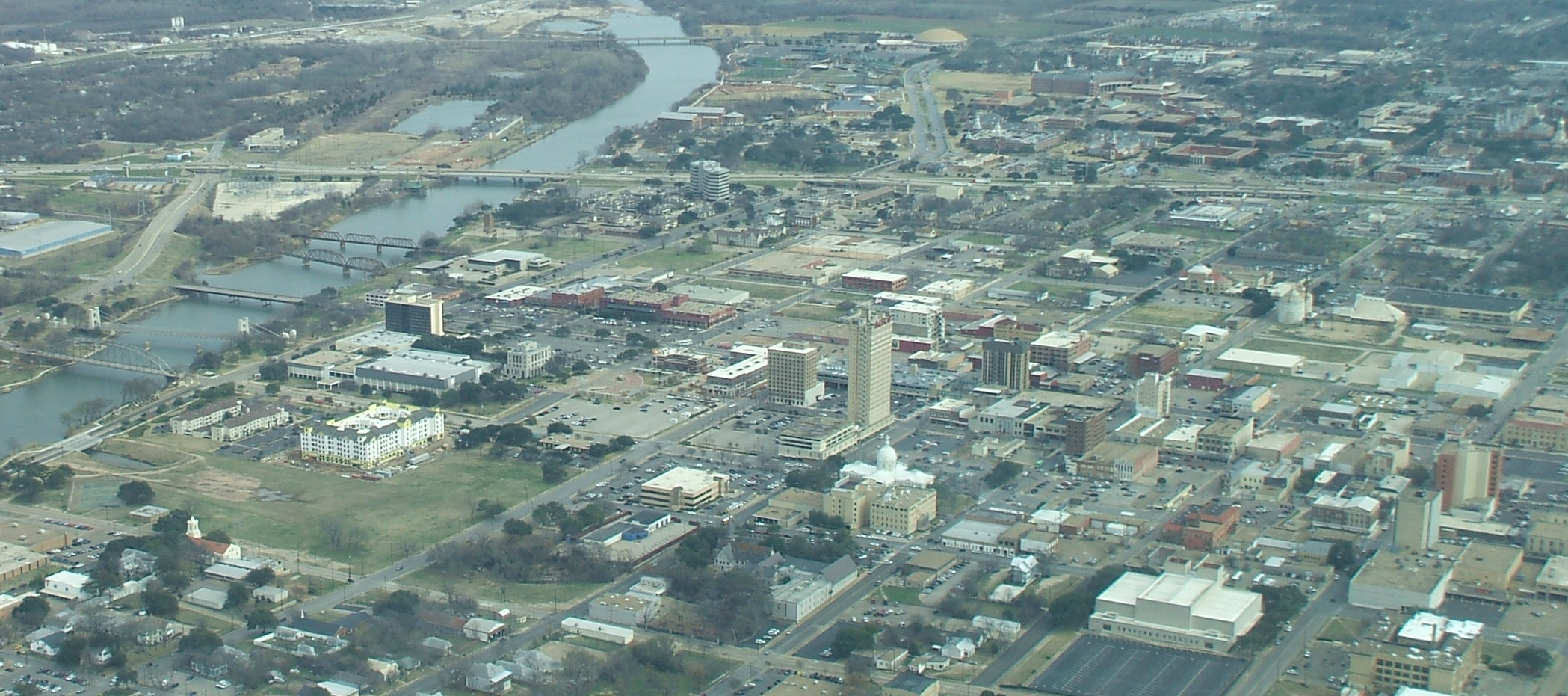
Aerial view of downtown Waco in 2009; Brazos River to the left and campus of Baylor University in the upper right

According to the Greater Waco Chamber of Commerce, the top employers in McLennan County are:

| # | Employer | Employees 2015 | Employees 2023 |
|---|---|---|---|
| 1 | Baylor University | 2,675 | 3,253 |
| 2 | Waco Independent School District | 2,500 | 2,373 |
| 3 | Ascension Providence | 2,397 | 2,300 |
| 4 | HEB | 1,500 | 2,000 |
| 5 | Baylor Scott & White Health (Hillcrest) | 1,800 | 1,736 |
| 6 | TSTC | | 1,706 |
| 7 | Veterans Affairs | | 1,682 |
| 8 | City of Waco | 1,506 | 1,518 |
| 9 | Sanderson Farms, Inc. | 1,041 | 1,200 |
| 10 | Walmart | 1,656 | 1,174 |
| 11 | McLennan County | | 1,157 |
| 12 | Midway Independent School District | 1,067 | 1,081 |
| 13 | AbbVie | | 785 |
| 14 | L3 Technologies | 2,300 | 774 |
| 14 | McLennan Community College | | 719 |
| 15 | Mars Wrigley | | 700 |
| 16 | Aramark | | 696 |
| 17 | American Income Life Insurance | | 693 |
| 18 | Magnolia Network | | 675 |
| 19 | Texas Materials | | 672 |
| 20 | Cargill Value Added Meats | | 646 |
| 21 | Tractor Supply | | 640 |
| 22 | SpaceX | | 590 |

== Elected leadership ==
| Legislative representation | Name | Service |
|---|---|---|
| United States Congress, District 17 | Pete Sessions | 2019 – Present |
| State Senator, District 22 | Brian Birdwell | 2010 – Present |
| State Representative, District 56 | Charles Doc Anderson | 2005 – Present |
| State Representative, District 13 | Angelia Orr | 2023 – Present |

| County Elected Leadership | Name | Service |
|---|---|---|
| County Judge | Scott Felton | 2012 – Present |
| County Commissioner Pct 1 | Jim Smith | 2021 – Present |
| County Commissioner Pct 2 | Donis "D.L." Wilson | 2024 – Present |
| County Commissioner Pct 3 | Will Jones | 2013 – Present |
| County Commissioner Pct 4 | Ben Perry | 2011 – Present |
| District Attorney | Josh Tetens | 2023 – Present |
| District Clerk | Ralph Stratus (Interim) | 2015 – Present |
| County Clerk | Andy Harwell | 1995 – Present |
| County Sheriff | Parnell McNamara | 2013 – Present |
| County Tax Assessor-Collector | Randy Riggs | 2012 – Present |
| County Treasurer | Bill Helton | 2012 – Present, 1991 - 2010 |
| Constable Pct. 1 | Walt Strickland | 2013 - Present |
| Constable Pct. 2 | Reggie Jackson | 2026 - Present |
| Constable Pct. 3 | David Maler | 2011 - Present |
| Constable Pct. 4 | Charlie Guerrero | 2021 - Present |
| Constable Pct. 5 | Freddie Cantu | 2011 - Present |

| Local Judiciary | Name | Service |
|---|---|---|
| Tenth Court of Appeals, Chief | Tom Gray | 2003 – Present, 1999 - 2003 Associate Justice |
| Tenth court of Appeals, Place 2 | Matt Johnson | 2021 – Present, 2007 - 2020 Judge 54TH District Court |
| Tenth court of Appeals, Place 3 | Steve Smith | 2021 – Present, 1998 - 2021 Judge 361ST District Court |
| State District Judge, 19TH Court | Thomas West | 2021 – Present |
| State District Judge, 54TH Court | Susan Kelly | 2021 – Present |
| State District Judge, 74TH Court | Gary Coley, Jr. | 2009 – Present, Local Administrative Judge |
| State District Judge, 170TH Court | Jim Meyer | 2003 – Present |
| State District Judge, 414TH Court | Vicki Menard | 2006 – December 1, 2023, |
| State District Judge, 474TH Court | Alan Bennett | 2023 – Present, appointed by Gov Abbott |
| County Court at Law Judge, Court 1 | Vikram 'Vik' Deivanayagam | 2018 – Present |
| County Court at Law Judge, Court 2 | Brad Cates | 2011 – Present |
| County Court at Law Judge, Court 3 | Ryan Luna | 2021 – Present |

== Politics ==
Similar to other counties in the Texas Triangle with mid-sized cities, the county has been reliably Republican since the 1970s, having last voted for a Democratic presidential candidate in 1976 when it was won by Jimmy Carter.

Several governors of Texas hailed from McLennan County: Ann Richards (1991–1995), the state's second female governor; Pat Morris Neff (1921–1925), who also served as president of Baylor University; Lawrence Sullivan Ross (1887–1891), whose family helped found Waco and who also served as the fourth president of Texas A&M University; and Richard Coke (1874–1876).

United States presidential election results for McLennan County, Texas
| Year | Republican | | Democratic | | Third party(ies) | |
| Year | No. | % | No. | % | No. | % |
|---|---|---|---|---|---|---|
| 1912 | 295 | 6.38% | 3,829 | 82.79% | 501 | 10.83% |
| 1916 | 940 | 15.53% | 4,979 | 82.26% | 134 | 2.21% |
| 1920 | 1,655 | 21.19% | 4,975 | 63.71% | 1,179 | 15.10% |
| 1924 | 2,384 | 22.24% | 7,882 | 73.52% | 455 | 4.24% |
| 1928 | 5,744 | 51.81% | 5,330 | 48.07% | 13 | 0.12% |
| 1932 | 1,108 | 8.40% | 11,972 | 90.80% | 105 | 0.80% |
| 1936 | 1,116 | 8.11% | 12,489 | 90.77% | 154 | 1.12% |
| 1940 | 2,178 | 11.99% | 15,952 | 87.82% | 35 | 0.19% |
| 1944 | 1,668 | 8.95% | 15,336 | 82.31% | 1,627 | 8.73% |
| 1948 | 3,088 | 15.32% | 16,034 | 79.55% | 1,035 | 5.13% |
| 1952 | 14,974 | 46.39% | 17,251 | 53.45% | 53 | 0.16% |
| 1956 | 15,561 | 48.85% | 16,181 | 50.80% | 111 | 0.35% |
| 1960 | 14,926 | 42.46% | 20,100 | 57.17% | 130 | 0.37% |
| 1964 | 10,892 | 27.68% | 28,429 | 72.25% | 25 | 0.06% |
| 1968 | 15,958 | 34.22% | 22,388 | 48.00% | 8,293 | 17.78% |
| 1972 | 33,377 | 67.45% | 15,947 | 32.23% | 161 | 0.33% |
| 1976 | 25,370 | 45.33% | 30,091 | 53.76% | 509 | 0.91% |
| 1980 | 31,968 | 53.71% | 26,305 | 44.20% | 1,242 | 2.09% |
| 1984 | 42,232 | 64.40% | 23,206 | 35.39% | 140 | 0.21% |
| 1988 | 38,606 | 58.12% | 27,545 | 41.47% | 272 | 0.41% |
| 1992 | 28,473 | 40.67% | 25,903 | 37.00% | 15,640 | 22.34% |
| 1996 | 30,666 | 48.61% | 27,050 | 42.88% | 5,367 | 8.51% |
| 2000 | 43,955 | 63.90% | 23,462 | 34.11% | 1,372 | 1.99% |
| 2004 | 52,090 | 65.73% | 26,760 | 33.76% | 404 | 0.51% |
| 2008 | 49,044 | 61.56% | 29,998 | 37.65% | 632 | 0.79% |
| 2012 | 47,903 | 64.26% | 25,694 | 34.47% | 944 | 1.27% |
| 2016 | 48,260 | 61.03% | 27,063 | 34.22% | 3,752 | 4.74% |
| 2020 | 59,543 | 60.84% | 36,688 | 37.49% | 1,641 | 1.68% |
| 2024 | 64,606 | 64.82% | 33,863 | 33.97% | 1,203 | 1.21% |

United States Senate election results for McLennan County, Texas1
| Year | Republican | | Democratic | | Third party(ies) | |
| Year | No. | % | No. | % | No. | % |
|---|---|---|---|---|---|---|
| 2024 | 62,054 | 62.19% | 35,632 | 35.71% | 2,091 | 2.10% |

United States Senate election results for McLennan County, Texas2
| Year | Republican | | Democratic | | Third party(ies) | |
| Year | No. | % | No. | % | No. | % |
|---|---|---|---|---|---|---|
| 2020 | 60,036 | 62.45% | 33,439 | 34.79% | 2,654 | 2.76% |
| 2026 | 44,107 | 53.03% | 37,032 | 44.53% | 2,028 | 2.44% |

Texas Gubernatorial election results for McLennan County
| Year | Republican | | Democratic | | Third party(ies) | |
| Year | No. | % | No. | % | No. | % |
|---|---|---|---|---|---|---|
| 2022 | 47,875 | 65.95% | 23,765 | 32.74% | 950 | 1.31% |
| 2026 | 46,939 | 56.13% | 35,156 | 42.04% | 1,525 | 1.82% |

== Education ==
=== Colleges ===
- Baylor University
- McLennan Community College
- Texas State Technical College

All of McLennan County is in the service area of McLennan Community College.

=== Public school districts ===
School districts include:

- Axtell Independent School District
- Bosqueville Independent School District
- Bruceville-Eddy Independent School District
- China Spring Independent School District
- Connally Independent School District
- Crawford Independent School District
- Gholson Independent School District
- Hallsburg Independent School District
- La Vega Independent School District
- Lorena Independent School District
- Mart Independent School District
- McGregor Independent School District
- Midway Independent School District
- Moody Independent School District
- Oglesby Independent School District
- Riesel Independent School District
- Robinson Independent School District
- Valley Mills Independent School District
- Waco Independent School District
- West Independent School District

== See also ==
- List of museums in Central Texas
- National Register of Historic Places listings in McLennan County Texas
- Recorded Texas Historic Landmarks in McLennan County
- Texas Triangle
