= Ocee, Texas =

Unincorporated community in Texas, US

Coordinates: 31°33′22″N 97°21′20″W

Ocee is an unincorporated community in McLennan County in Central Texas, United States. It lies at an elevation of 574 ft (175 m).
