= Lorena Independent School District =

School district in Texas

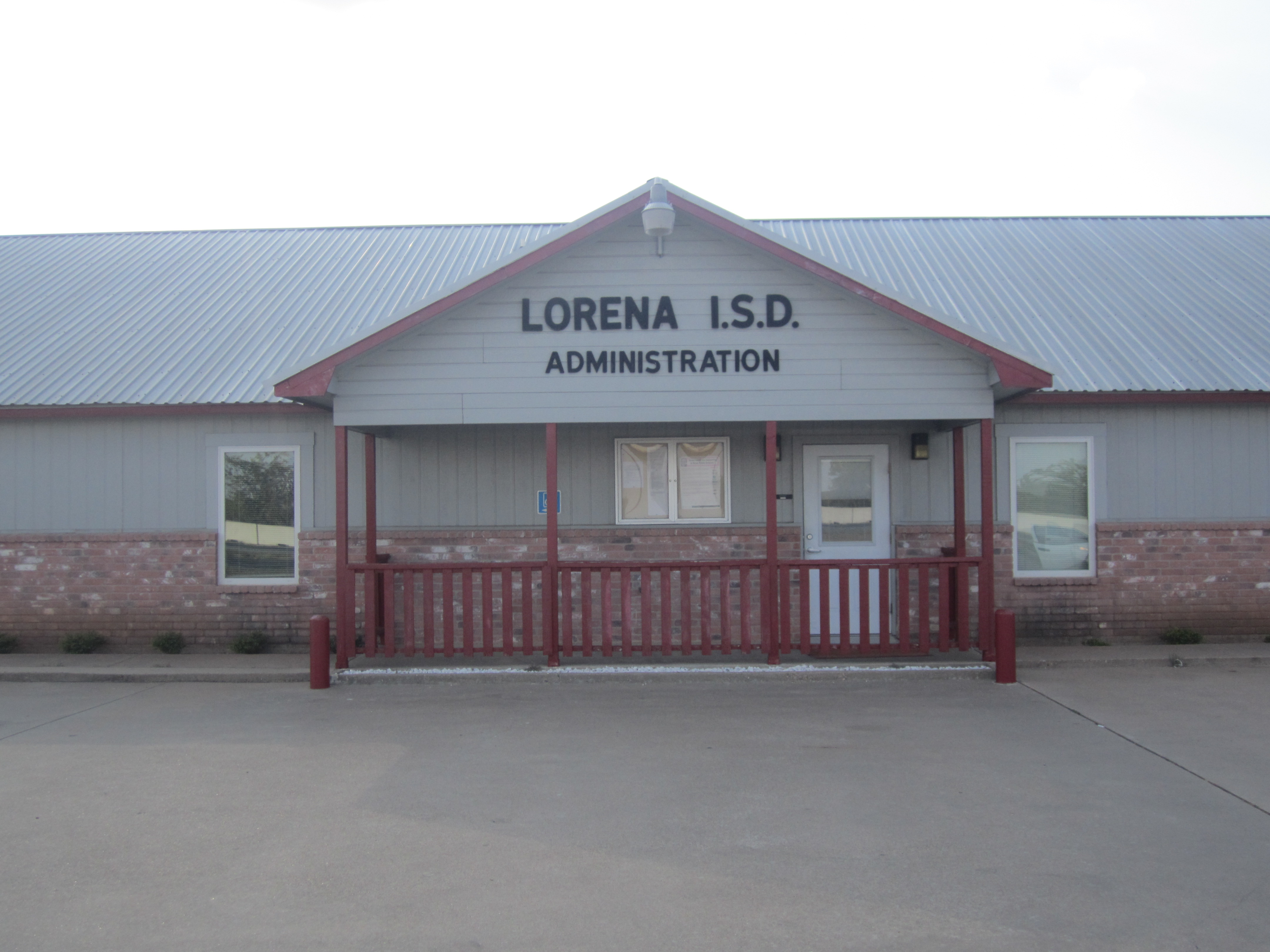
The Lorena Independent School District building is located off Interstate 35 in Lorena, Texas.

Lorena Independent School District is a public school district based in Lorena, Texas (USA).

Located in McLennan County, a small portion of the district extends into Falls County.

The district includes the vast majority of Lorena as well as small pieces of Hewitt and Waco.

== Schools ==
- Lorena High (Grades 9–12)
- Lorena Middle (Grades 6–8)
- Lorena Elementary (Grades 3–5)
- Lorena Primary (Grades PK-2)
