= Crash at Crush =

1896 rail crash publicity stunt in Texas, US

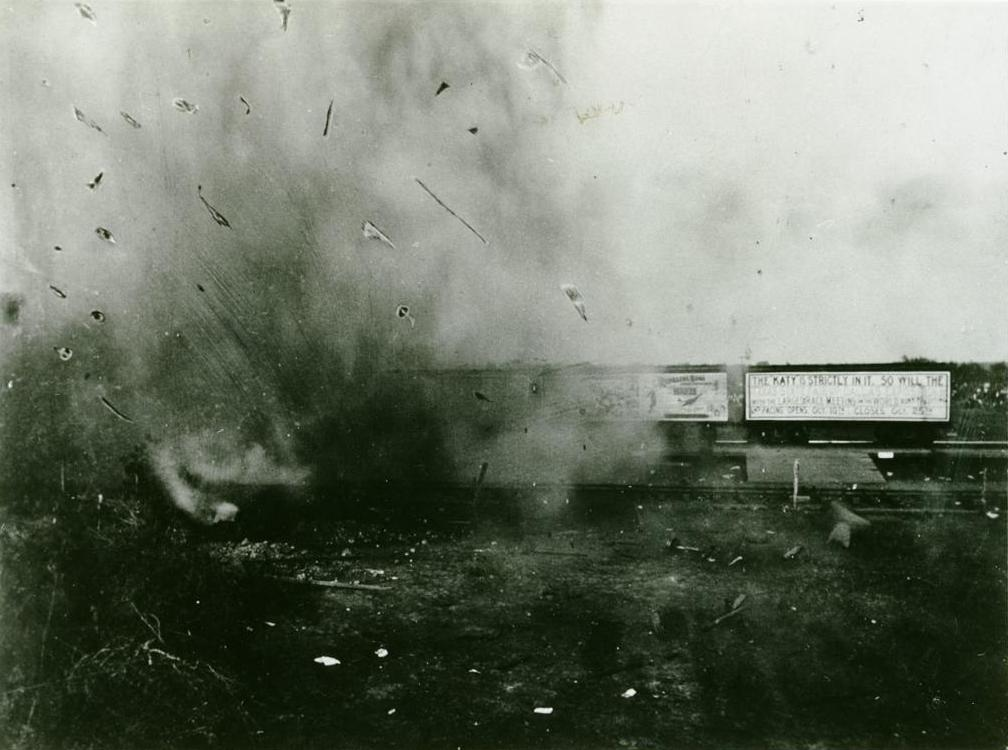
- The locomotive boilers exploding during impact
- Date: September 15, 1896
- Location: "Crush", McLennan County, Texas, United States; 31.74510°N 97.09957°W
- Type: Train wreck publicity stunt
- Organized by: Missouri, Kansas and Texas Railway
- Deaths: 2
- Injuries: 6+

The Crash at Crush was a one-day publicity stunt in the U.S. state of Texas that took place on September 15, 1896, in which two uncrewed locomotives were crashed into each other head-on at high speed. William George Crush, general passenger agent of the Missouri–Kansas–Texas Railroad, conceived the idea in order to demonstrate a staged train wreck as a public spectacle. No admission was charged, and train fares to the crash site – called Crush, set up as a temporary destination for the event – were offered at the reduced rate of US$3.50 in 1896 (equivalent to $132.36 in 2025) from any location in Texas.

As a result, an estimated 40,000 people – more people than the second-largest city in the state at the time – attended the event. Unexpectedly, the impact caused both engine boilers to explode, resulting in a shower of flying debris that killed two people and caused numerous injuries among the spectators.

== Preparations ==
The Missouri–Kansas–Texas Railroad (popularly known as the "Katy", from its "M-K-T" initials) had first reached the Crush area in the 1880s, during the construction of a route between Dallas and Houston. As the railroad expanded, the Katy replaced its 30-ton steam engines with newer, more powerful 60-ton engines, and subsequently a stockpile of the older units, for which the railroad now had no use, began to accumulate.

In 1896, Katy agent William Crush proposed a publicity stunt that could make use of the obsolete Katy trains to be held along the Dallas–Houston route at a site 14 miles (23 km) north of Waco and 3 miles (4.8 km) south of the town of West, in McLennan County.

A locomotive crash staged by the Columbus and Hocking Valley Railroad at Buckeye Park near Lancaster, Ohio, on May 30, 1896, had been a huge success. Buckeye Park was established and owned by the railroad to entice residents of nearby Columbus to take weekend excursions. The locomotive crash was planned for the park's annual opening day and drew approximately 20,000 spectators. While no admission was charged, money was made on the railroad passenger traffic to and from the park.

Crush imagined a similar spectacle for which Katy could advertise to thousands of potential passengers. Crush's superiors agreed to his proposal and put him in charge of the project. As with the crash at Buckeye Park, the event would be free of charge, instead profiting from the sale of tickets on special excursion trains that would run to and from the site.

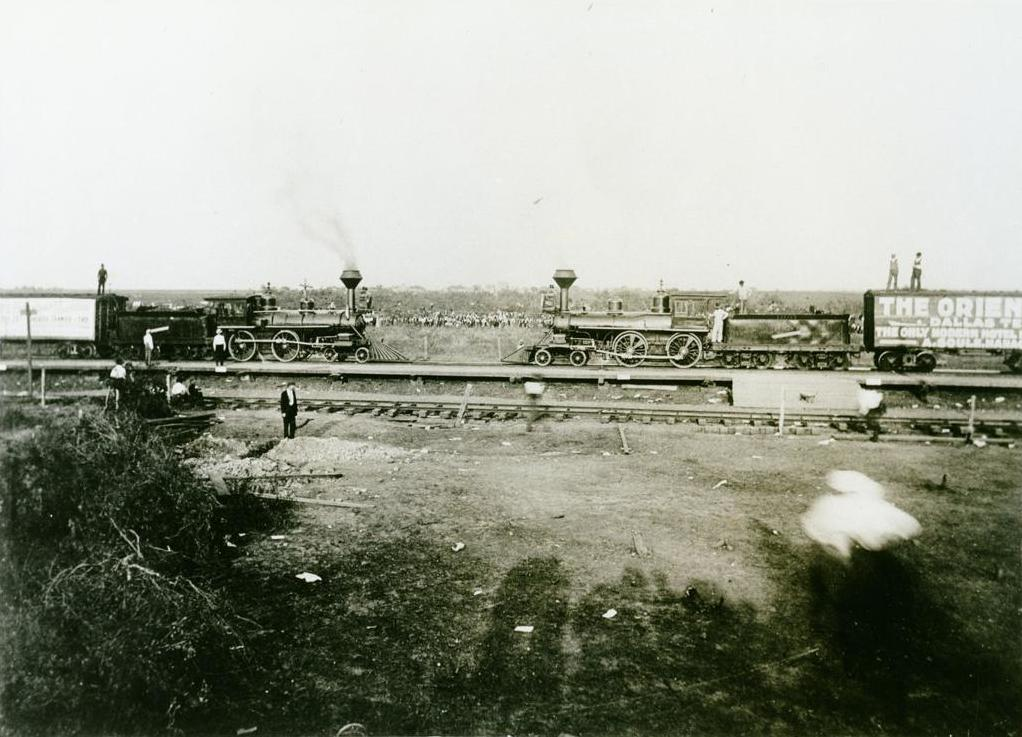
The locomotives brought together at about 5 pm for publicity photos

Two water wells were drilled at the site and a circus tent from Ringling Brothers was erected, as well as a grandstand, three speakers' stands, a platform for reporters, two telegraph offices, and a special train depot, over which a giant sign proclaimed the new town as "Crush, Texas". Events from the Midway Plaisance, including lemonade stands, carnival games, medicine shows, cigar vendors and other sideshows were highly anticipated, with a construction foreman saying that "This feature alone will be worth going to Crush to see." A separate four-mile segment of track was built for the event alongside the Katy railroad so that there was no chance a runaway train could end up on the main line; each end of the track was situated atop a low hill on opposite sides of a bowl-shaped valley in which the trains would meet. The locomotives to be used were two 35-short-ton (32 t) decommissioned Baldwin engines, No. 999 and No. 1001.

=== Safety precautions ===
On the day before the exhibition, railroad officials staged a speed test of the engines to help predict the precise point of collision. Katy engineers assured Crush that his grand idea was safe, specifically that the boilers on the steam engines had been designed to resist ruptures and that, even in a very high-speed crash, they were unlikely to explode. Each engine would pull six boxcars behind it; because the couplers used to link the cars were considered unreliable, the cars were chained together to prevent them from coming apart during the impact.

Crush insisted on restricting the general public to a minimum of 200 yards (180 m) away from the track, but allowed members of the press to be within 100 yards. Katy officials expected a crowd of between 20,000 and 25,000 people to attend but, as a result of overwhelming marketing success and selling out of more than 30 special excursion trains bringing people to the event, an estimated 40,000 people were ultimately in attendance.

== Crash ==
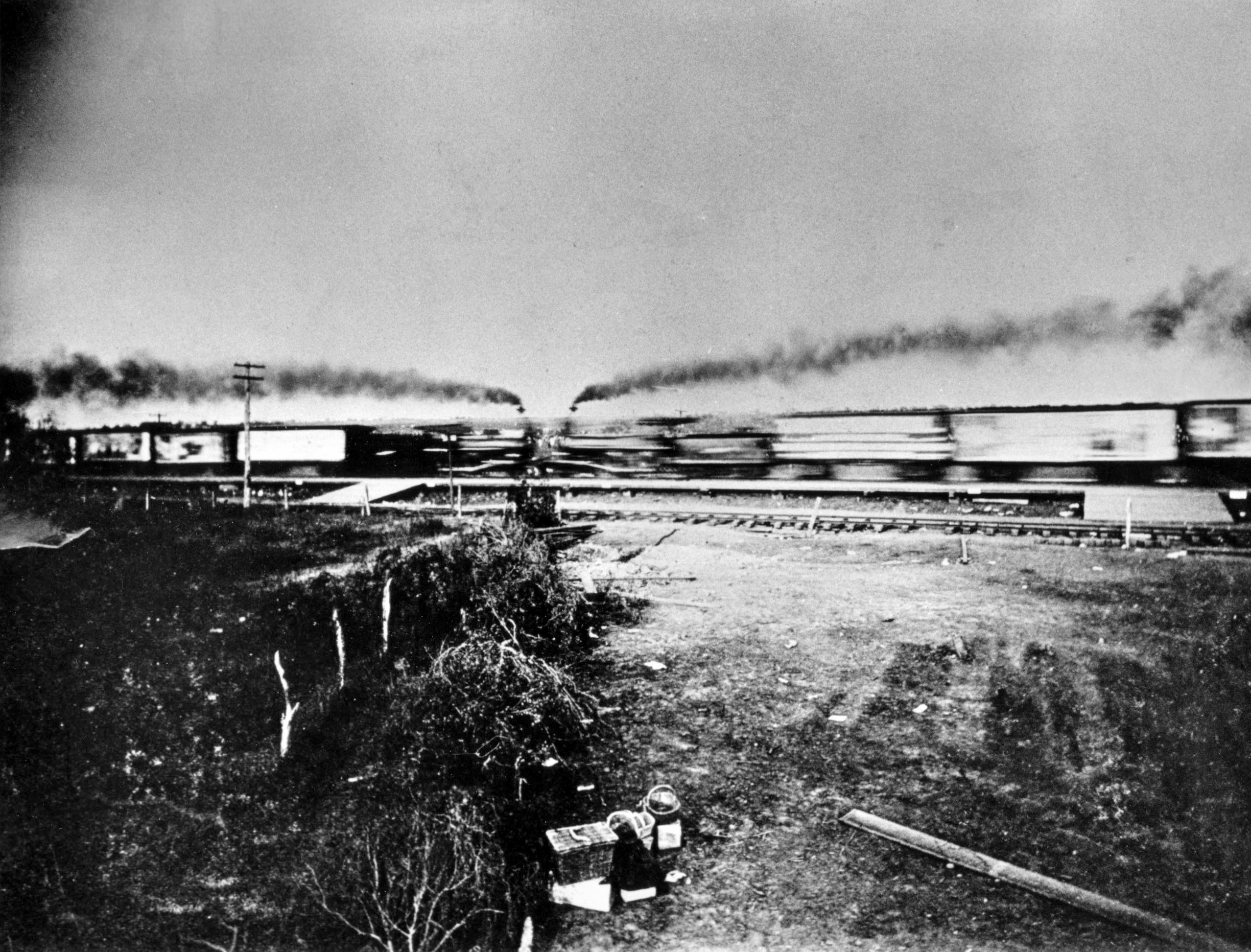
The moment of impact. Photographer Joe Deane was blinded in one eye by a flying bolt seconds after taking this photograph.

The crash was delayed for an hour because the crowd resisted being pressed back by the police to what was supposedly a safe distance. At about 5 pm, the two trains, pulling cars loaded with railroad ties, slowly met in the middle of the track to be photographed. They were then rolled to their starting points at the opposite ends of the track. Crush, riding a white charger, signaled the start of the main event. The engineers and crew aboard each train opened the steam to a prearranged setting, rode for exactly four turns of the driving wheels, and then jumped from the trains. The September 16 issue of The Dallas Morning News described what happened next:

The rumble of the two trains, faint and far off at first, but growing nearer and more distinct with each fleeting second, was like the gathering force of a cyclone. Nearer and nearer they came, the whistles of each blowing repeatedly and the torpedoes which had been placed on the track exploding in almost a continuous round like the rattle of musketry... They rolled down at a frightful rate of speed to within a quarter of a mile of each other. Nearer and nearer as they approached the fatal meeting place the rumbling increased, the roaring grew louder...

Each train reached a speed of about 45 miles per hour (72 km/h) by the time they met near the anticipated spot, though some observers believed they were traveling much faster. As the trains collided, there was a large explosion:

A crash, a sound of timbers rent and torn, and then a shower of splinters... There was just a swift instance of silence, and then as if controlled by a single impulse both boilers exploded simultaneously and the air was filled with flying missiles of iron and steel varying in size from a postage stamp to half of a driving wheel...

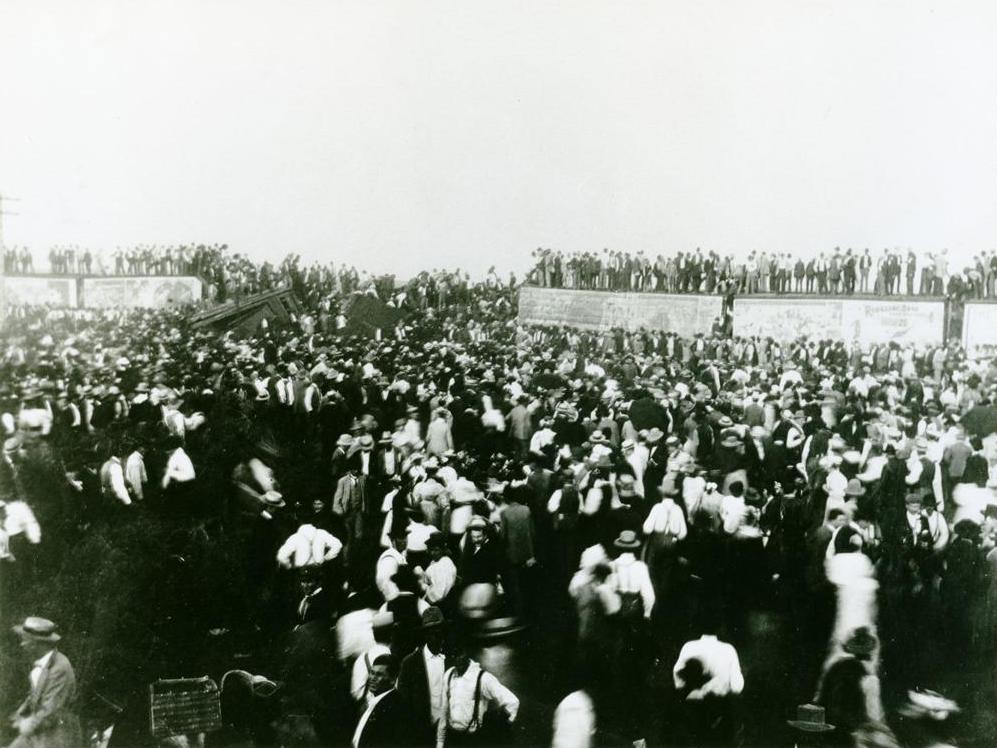
The crowd explores the wreckage

Debris was blown hundreds of feet into the air. Panic quickly broke out as the crowd turned and ran. Some of the debris came down among the spectators, killing two and seriously injuring at least six others. A photographer, Jarvis "Joe" Deane of Waco, lost one eye to a flying bolt. The locomotives and their boxcars were reduced to scraps of wood and steel:

All that remained of the two engines and twelve cars was a smoking mass of fractured metal and kindling wood, except one car on the rear of each train, which had been left untouched. The engines had both been completely telescoped, and contrary to experience in such cases, instead of rising in the air from the force of the blow, were just flattened out. There was nothing about the cars big enough to save except pieces of wood, which were eagerly seized upon and carried home as souvenirs.

== Aftermath ==
"The Great Crush Collision March" composed by Scott Joplin to commemorate the event.

The story made national headlines, and Crush was immediately "fired" from the Katy Railroad. In light of a lack of negative publicity, however, he was "rehired" the next day and continued to work for the company until his retirement, in a career spanning six decades. The Katy Railroad quickly settled several lawsuits from the victims' families with cash and lifetime rail passes; the injured photographer received damages amounting to US$10,000 in 1896 (equivalent to more than $370,000 in 2025). Though the incident had resulted in tragedy, the Katy benefited enormously from the attention it received, including international recognition. Despite the disaster, many railroads continued to stage locomotive collisions in the following years.

Ragtime composer Scott Joplin, who was performing in the region at the time, composed a piano piece he called the "Great Crush Collision March" to commemorate the crash; the composition was dedicated to the Missouri-Kansas-Texas Railway. It was copyrighted on October 15, 1896, a month after the event. The piece was notable because it included instructions in the score for how to replicate the sounds of the trains' collision through playing techniques, specific notes, and the use of dynamics.

In 1976, the Texas Historical Commission erected a historical marker (number 5315) a few miles from the site in West, Texas at the Katy Depot.

In 2025, British alternative band Red Rum Club released a song about the event entitled Crush, TX.

== See also ==
- List of train songs
