= Gholson, Texas =

- City
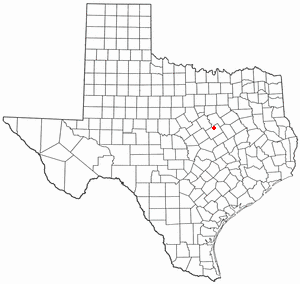
- Location of Gholson, Texas

- Coordinates: 31°43′47″N 97°14′40″W
- Country: United States
- State: Texas
- County: McLennan

Area
  - Total: 8.73 sq mi (22.60 km^{2})
  - Land: 8.71 sq mi (22.55 km^{2})
  - Water: 0.019 sq mi (0.05 km^{2})
- Elevation: 469 ft (143 m)

Population (2020)
  - Total: 1,250
  - Density: 144/sq mi (55.4/km^{2})
- Time zone: UTC-6 (Central (CST))
  - Summer (DST): UTC-5 (CDT)
- ZIP code: 76705
- Area code: 254
- FIPS code: 48-29408
- GNIS feature ID: 2410586
- Website: cityofgholson.gov

Gholson is a city in McLennan County, Texas, United States. The population was recorded as 1,250 in the 2020 census. It is part of the Waco metropolitan area.

The area was settled in the 1840s, and was originally known as Sardis. The name Gholson, named after its early settlers, brothers Benjamin and Samuel Gholson, came into gradual use, and became the official name of the post office in 1887.

== Geography ==
Gholson is located at the intersection of FMs 933 and 1858, twelve miles northwest of Waco.

According to the United States Census Bureau, the city has a total land area of 11.7 square miles (30 km^{2}).

In 2016, Gholson was reported as not having a stoplight.

=== Climate ===
The climate in this area is characterized by hot, humid summers and generally mild to cool winters. According to the Köppen Climate Classification system, Gholson has a humid subtropical climate.

== Demographics ==
Historical population
Census	Pop.	Note	%±
1980	263		—
1990	692		163.1%
2000	922		33.2%
2010	1,061		15.1%
2020	1,250		17.8%
U.S. Decennial Census; 2020 Census

=== 2020 census ===
As of the 2020 census, Gholson had a population of 1,250. The median age was 45.9 years, 21.2% of residents were under the age of 18, and 23.4% of residents were 65 years of age or older. For every 100 females there were 98.4 males, and for every 100 females age 18 and over there were 101.4 males age 18 and over.

0.0% of residents lived in urban areas, while 100.0% lived in rural areas.

There were 488 households in Gholson, of which 29.5% had children under the age of 18 living in them. Of all households, 56.6% were married-couple households, 17.8% were households with a male householder and no spouse or partner present, and 19.1% were households with a female householder and no spouse or partner present. About 25.2% of all households were made up of individuals and 14.6% had someone living alone who was 65 years of age or older.

There were 522 housing units, of which 6.5% were vacant. The homeowner vacancy rate was 1.2% and the rental vacancy rate was 7.4%.

Racial composition as of the 2020 census
Race	Number	Percent
White	1,060	84.8%
Black or African American	19	1.5%
American Indian and Alaska Native	12	1.0%
Asian	6	0.5%
Native Hawaiian and Other Pacific Islander	2	0.2%
Some other race	59	4.7%
Two or more races	92	7.4%
Hispanic or Latino (of any race)	172	13.8%

=== 2000 census ===
In the 2000 census, there were 922 people, 347 households, and 275 families residing in the city. The population density was 78.6 inhabitants per square mile (30.3/km^{2}). There were 374 housing units at an average density of 31.9 per square mile (12.3/km^{2}). The racial makeup of the city was 89.91% White, 4.56% African American, 1.84% Native American, 0.11% Pacific Islander, 2.71% from other races, and 0.87% from two or more races. Hispanic or Latino of any race were 6.94% of the population.

There were 347 households, of which 31.7% had children under the age of 18 living with them, 65.7% were married couples living together, 7.8% had a female householder with no husband present, and 20.5% were non-families. 17.3% of all households were made up of individuals, and 6.6% had someone living alone who was 65 years of age or older. The average household size was 2.66 and the average family size was 2.98.

In the city, the population was spread out, with 25.3% under the age of 18, 10.2% from 18 to 24, 27.9% from 25 to 44, 26.4% from 45 to 64, and 10.3% who were 65 years of age or older. The median age was 38 years. For every 100 females, there were 104.9 males. For every 100 females age 18 and over, there were 101.5 males.

The median income for a household in the city was $37,500, and the median income for a family was $41,875. Males had a median income of $27,656 versus $22,222 for females. The per capita income for the city was $15,868. About 6.9% of families and 11.0% of the population were below the poverty line, including 10.8% of those under age 18 and 17.5% of those age 65 or over.

== Education ==
Gholson Independent School District operates the public schools in the area.
