= Midway Independent School District (McLennan County, Texas) =

School district in Texas

Coordinates: 31.4877°N 97.2452°W

Midway Independent School District is a public school district based in Woodway, Texas, USA.

It includes, in addition to most of Woodway: Willow Grove, most of Hewitt, portions of western Waco, and a small section of McGregor.

== About ==
The district is located in central McLennan County, and serves the cities of Hewitt, Woodway, and parts of Waco, Crawford, Lorena, McGregor and Robinson, as well as some unincorporated areas of McLennan County. In statewide parlance, the district is sometimes referred to as Waco Midway or Hewitt Midway to distinguish it from the Tuloso-Midway Independent School District near Corpus Christi, Texas.

- In 2016 and 2017, the school district was rated as "Met Standard" by Texas Education Agency. Student achievement, student progress, closing performance gaps and postsecondary readiness were all above target score. *Midway students were in the top 25% for student progress, closing performance gaps and postsecondary readiness.
- In 2010, 2011 and 2012 the school district was rated "recognized" by the Texas Education Agency.
- Seven out of 10 campuses received recognitions through designated distinction areas.
- Both intermediate campuses (Woodgate and River Valley) received Distinction Designation in all three possible categories.
- Woodway Elementary and Speegleville Elementary received Distinction Designation in all three possible categories.
- Speegleville Elementary was ranked number one in “Student Progress” among its peer schools across the state, and Woodway Elementary was ranked number three among its peer schools. (Every campus has a unique set of peers determined by the state as having very similar size, demographics, and economic status.)
- Midway High School ranked in top quartile of its peer campuses in four Reading/ELA indicators, including Greater Than Expected Progress, AP Examination Performance, SAT Performance, and ACT Performance.
- College Board announced that 56 juniors and seniors at Midway High School earned AP Scholar Awards for exceptional achievement on Advanced Placement exams.

Previously the district headquarters were in Waco.

== History ==
- In 1947, the communities of South Bosque consolidated their schools. The district was midway between Hewitt and South Bosque.
- In 1972, Speegleville ISD merged with Midway ISD. After four years of growth, the "new" high school was opened in 1976.
- In 2003, another "new" high school opened.
- Since the creation of Midway ISD, there have been 7,808 people employed.

In 2021, during the COVID-19 pandemic in Texas, the office of Governor of Texas Greg Abbott sued the school district, saying it required masks when the governor forbid such, even though the district leadership stated it does not require masks.

== The Education Foundation ==
"The mission of the Midway ISD Education Foundation is to generate and distribute resources to the Midway Independent School District for programs and projects that enhance the quality of education."

- In the 2017-2018 school year the foundation provided 65 grants totaling over $162, 325
- Provides: First Year Teacher Incentive, Spirit of Midway Award, Jeanie Holdbrook Moss Scholarship, Special Olympics Support, Showcase of Stars, Academic Letter Jackets, Treasure for Training, Avid support
- All grants are awarded in honor of specific donors

== Schools ==
Residents living in the Midway ISD zone are served by a single high school, two middle schools, and eight elementary schools, following re-alignment for the 2022-23 school year. Two schools previously serving 5th and 6th graders as Intermediate Schools were reconfigured as a new Middle School and new Elementary School, respectively, in addition to the construction of a new Elementary School for the district.

=== High School (Grades 9-12) ===
- Midway High School

=== Middle Schools (Grades 6-8) ===
- Midway Middle
- River Valley Middle
  - formerly River Valley Intermediate

=== Elementary Schools (Grades PK-5) ===
- Castleman Creek Elementary
- Chapel Park Elementary
  - formerly Woodgate Intermediate
- Hewitt Elementary School
- Park Hill Elementary
  - Built and opened for the 2022-23 school year
- South Bosque Elementary
- Spring Valley Elementary
- Woodway Elementary
  - 1985-86 National Blue Ribbon School
