= Neil McLennan =

Scottish-American settler of Texas

Neil McLennan (September 2, 1777, 1778, or 1787 – 1867) was an early Scottish-American settler of Texas. McLennan County, Texas, was named after him.

McLennan was born on the Isle of Skye in Scotland. In 1801, he and many friends and family immigrated to Richmond County, North Carolina, moving further south to Florida. The McLennans were Gaelic speakers and Presbyterians. Around 1820, they were invited by Yuchi Chief Sam Story to become the first white settlers in Walton County, Florida. In December 1834, Neil and his brothers, Laughlin and John, along with some of their families and friends immigrated to Texas, sailing a self-built three-masted schooner from Pensacola, Florida, to the mouth of the Brazos River, where they arrived in March 1835.

After a short stay at present-day Columbus, Texas, Neil obtained a grant of a league of land at McLennan's Bluff (a mile west of present-day Rosebud, Falls County) in Robertson's Colony in July 1835, where he and his group settled. Laughlin McLennan, Laughlin's wife, and mother, were killed in an Indian raid the following winter, and John was likewise killed in 1838, after which the McLennan group moved to the Robertson Colony's headquarters of Nashville-on-the-Brazos in present-day Milam County.

In 1845, Neil McLennan moved his family to a site on the Bosque River near present-day Waco, and he died at his home there in 1867, renowned as "the patriarch of the Bosque".
