= Hallsburg, Texas =

- City
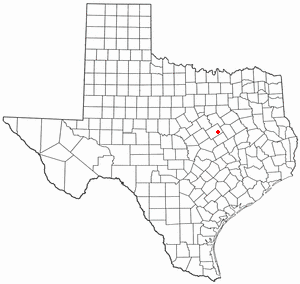
- Location of Hallsburg, Texas

- Coordinates: 31°33′23″N 96°55′38″W
- Country: United States
- State: Texas
- County: McLennan

Area
  - Total: 5.31 sq mi (13.74 km^{2})
  - Land: 5.18 sq mi (13.42 km^{2})
  - Water: 0.12 sq mi (0.32 km^{2})
- Elevation: 472 ft (144 m)

Population (2020)
  - Total: 419
  - Density: 80.9/sq mi (31.2/km^{2})
- Time zone: UTC-6 (Central (CST))
  - Summer (DST): UTC-5 (CDT)
- ZIP code: 76705
- Area code: 254
- FIPS code: 48-31880
- GNIS feature ID: 2410688

Hallsburg is a city in McLennan County, Texas, United States. The population was 419 at the 2020 census. It is part of the Waco Metropolitan Statistical Area.

== Geography ==
According to the United States Census Bureau, the city has a total area of 8.6 square miles (22 km^{2}), of which 8.4 square miles (22 km^{2}) is land and 0.2 square miles (0.52 km^{2}) (2.10%) is water.

== Demographics ==
Historical population
Census	Pop.	Note	%±
1980	455		—
1990	450		−1.1%
2000	518		15.1%
2010	507		−2.1%
2020	419		−17.4%
U.S. Decennial Census; 2020 Census

=== 2020 census ===
As of the 2020 census, Hallsburg had a population of 419. The median age was 43.4 years. 26.5% of residents were under the age of 18 and 16.5% of residents were 65 years of age or older. For every 100 females there were 98.6 males, and for every 100 females age 18 and over there were 96.2 males age 18 and over.

0.0% of residents lived in urban areas, while 100.0% lived in rural areas.

There were 152 households in Hallsburg, of which 30.9% had children under the age of 18 living in them. Of all households, 57.2% were married-couple households, 13.8% were households with a male householder and no spouse or partner present, and 22.4% were households with a female householder and no spouse or partner present. About 21.7% of all households were made up of individuals and 9.9% had someone living alone who was 65 years of age or older.

There were 171 housing units, of which 11.1% were vacant. The homeowner vacancy rate was 0.0% and the rental vacancy rate was 26.3%.

Racial composition as of the 2020 census
Race	Number	Percent
White	353	84.2%
Black or African American	10	2.4%
American Indian and Alaska Native	4	1.0%
Asian	0	0.0%
Native Hawaiian and Other Pacific Islander	1	0.2%
Some other race	9	2.1%
Two or more races	42	10.0%
Hispanic or Latino (of any race)	43	10.3%

=== 2000 census ===
As of the 2000 census, there were 518 people, 192 households, and 144 families residing in the city. The population density was 61.7 inhabitants per square mile (23.8/km^{2}). There were 209 housing units at an average density of 24.9/sq mi (9.6/km^{2}). The racial makeup of the city was 94.98% White, 2.12% African American, 0.77% Native American, 0.39% from other races, and 1.74% from two or more races. Hispanic or Latino of any race were 4.44% of the population.

There were 192 households, out of which 39.1% had children under the age of 18 living with them, 64.1% were married couples living together, 7.8% had a female householder with no husband present, and 24.5% were non-families. 22.9% of all households were made up of individuals, and 10.4% had someone living alone who was 65 years of age or older. The average household size was 2.70 and the average family size was 3.16.

In the city, the population was spread out, with 29.3% under the age of 18, 6.2% from 18 to 24, 29.2% from 25 to 44, 22.6% from 45 to 64, and 12.7% who were 65 years of age or older. The median age was 38 years. For every 100 females, there were 98.5 males. For every 100 females age 18 and over, there were 98.9 males.

The median income for a household in the city was $39,375, and the median income for a family was $52,708. Males had a median income of $31,538 versus $29,000 for females. The per capita income for the city was $17,355. About 7.7% of families and 5.6% of the population were below the poverty line, including 6.2% of those under age 18 and 7.5% of those age 65 or over.

== Education ==
Most of the City of Hallsburg is served by the Hallsburg Independent School District. Parts extend into the Axtell Independent School District, the Mart Independent School District, and the Riesel Independent School District.
