= Riesel, Texas =

- City
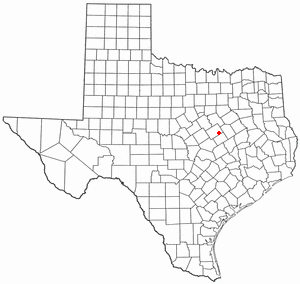
- Location of Riesel, Texas

- Coordinates: 31°28′32″N 96°55′53″W
- Country: United States
- State: Texas
- County: McLennan

Area
  - Total: 4.07 sq mi (10.53 km^{2})
  - Land: 4.05 sq mi (10.50 km^{2})
  - Water: 0.012 sq mi (0.03 km^{2})
- Elevation: 486 ft (148 m)

Population (2020)
  - Total: 1,062
  - Density: 255.7/sq mi (98.72/km^{2})
- Time zone: UTC-6 (Central (CST))
  - Summer (DST): UTC-5 (CDT)
- ZIP code: 76682
- Area code: 254
- FIPS code: 48-62108
- GNIS feature ID: 2410946
- Website: www.cityofriesel.org

Riesel is a city in McLennan County, Texas, United States. Its population was 1,062 at the 2020 census, a slight increase from the 1,007 people who lived in Riesel at the 2010 census. It is part of the Waco Metropolitan statistical area.

== History ==
Riesel, Texas, named after W.H. Riesel, one of the original settlers who built a Cotton gin there, has been growing steadily since being settled around 1880–1890. With the exception of a small decrease from 1930 to 1950, Riesel's population has continued to grow to a point where the town currently has over 1,000 residents.

A new power plant has increased city funds and the population. In early May, 2010, voters approved a $25,000,000 bond for the Riesel Independent School District that would build a new high school, administration building, and softball and baseball fields, among other things.

Before Riesel, the town was formerly known as Roddy and then Prospect.

== Geography ==
According to the United States Census Bureau, the city has a total area of 4.0 square miles (10 km^{2}), all land.

== Demographics ==
Historical population
Census	Pop.	Note	%±
1940	433		—
1950	409		−5.5%
1960	503		23.0%
1980	691		—
1990	839		21.4%
2000	973		16.0%
2010	1,007		3.5%
2020	1,062		5.5%
U.S. Decennial Census

=== 2020 census ===
As of the 2020 census, Riesel had a population of 1,062. The median age was 36.1 years. 26.6% of residents were under the age of 18 and 13.4% of residents were 65 years of age or older. For every 100 females there were 92.7 males, and for every 100 females age 18 and over there were 86.8 males age 18 and over.

0.0% of residents lived in urban areas, while 100.0% lived in rural areas.

There were 394 households in Riesel, of which 39.8% had children under the age of 18 living in them. Of all households, 54.8% were married-couple households, 11.7% were households with a male householder and no spouse or partner present, and 26.9% were households with a female householder and no spouse or partner present. About 19.0% of all households were made up of individuals and 10.4% had someone living alone who was 65 years of age or older.

There were 444 housing units, of which 11.3% were vacant. The homeowner vacancy rate was 3.1% and the rental vacancy rate was 14.3%.

Racial composition as of the 2020 census
Race	Number	Percent
White	900	84.7%
Black or African American	8	0.8%
American Indian and Alaska Native	4	0.4%
Asian	5	0.5%
Native Hawaiian and Other Pacific Islander	0	0.0%
Some other race	29	2.7%
Two or more races	116	10.9%
Hispanic or Latino (of any race)	135	12.7%

=== 2000 census ===
As of the census of 2000, 973 people, 357 households, and 287 families were residing in the city. The population density was 244.8 inhabitants per square mile (94.5/km^{2}). The 390 housing units had an average density of 98.1 per square mile (37.9/km^{2}). The racial makeup of the city was 94.76% White, 0.31% African American, 0.31% Native American, 0.72% Asian, 0.10% Pacific Islander, 3.08% from other races, and 0.72% from two or more races. Hispanics or Latinos of any race were 6.58% of the population.

Of the 357 households, 39.8% had children under 18 living with them, 66.4% were married couples living together, 10.1% had a female householder with no husband present, and 19.6% were not families. About 17.4% of all households were made up of individuals, and 9.2% had someone living alone who was 65 or older. The average household size was 2.73 and the average family size was 3.10.

In the city, the age distribution was 30.6% under 18, 4.6% from 18 to 24, 31.1% from 25 to 44, 18.7% from 45 to 64, and 14.9% who were 65 age or older. The median age was 36 years. For every 100 females, there were 89.7 males. For every 100 females 18 and over, there were 78.5 males.

The median income for a household in the city was $35,234, and the median income for a family was $38,875. Males had a median income of $30,313 versus $23,571 for females. The per capita income for the city was $15,315. About 7.4% of families and 9.5% of the population were below the poverty line, including 15.3% of those under age 18 and 4.4% of those age 65 or over.

== Education ==
The City of Riesel is served by the Riesel Independent School District.
