= Hallsburg Independent School District =

School district in Texas

Hallsburg Independent School District is a public school district based in Hallsburg, Texas (USA).

It has a single PreK-6 school.

In 2009, the school district was rated "recognized" by the Texas Education Agency.
