= Lorena, Texas =

- City
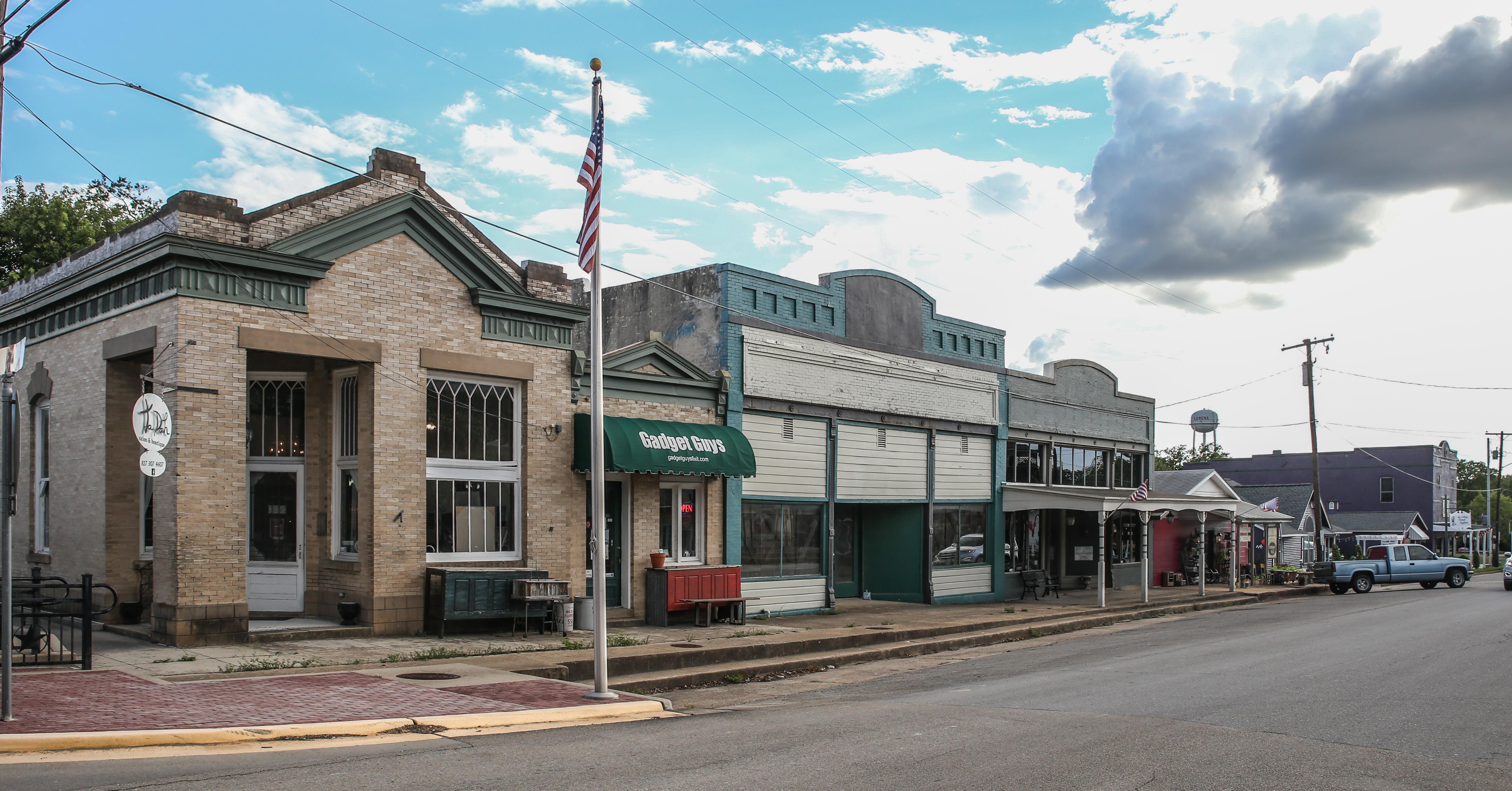
- Downtown Lorena

- Location within McLennan County

- Location within Texas Location within the United States
- Coordinates: 31°22′27″N 97°12′43″W
- Country: United States
- State: Texas
- County: McLennan
- Settled: 1854

Government
  - Type: Council–manager government

Area
  - Total: 3.40 sq mi (8.80 km^{2})
  - Land: 3.40 sq mi (8.80 km^{2})
  - Water: 0 sq mi (0.00 km^{2})
- Elevation: 604 ft (184 m)

Population (2020)
  - Total: 1,785
  - Density: 516.6/sq mi (199.46/km^{2})
- Time zone: UTC-6 (Central (CST))
  - Summer (DST): UTC-5 (CDT)
- ZIP code: 76655
- Area code: 254
- FIPS code: 48-44020
- GNIS feature ID: 2410873
- Website: www.ci.lorena.tx.us

Lorena is a small city in McLennan County, Texas, United States. The population was 1,785 at the 2020 census. It is part of the Waco Metropolitan Statistical Area.

== Geography ==
According to the United States Census Bureau, the city has a total area of 3.2 square miles (8.3 km^{2}), all land. Lorena is off Interstate 35 and where Highway 81 originally was located.

== Demographics ==
Historical population
Census	Pop.	Note	%±
1970	406		—
1980	619		52.5%
1990	1,158		87.1%
2000	1,433		23.7%
2010	1,691		18.0%
2020	1,785		5.6%
U.S. Decennial Census

=== 2020 census ===
As of the 2020 census, Lorena had a population of 1,785, 644 households, and 514 families residing in the city.

The median age was 36.0 years. 26.7% of residents were under the age of 18 and 14.5% of residents were 65 years of age or older. For every 100 females there were 92.3 males, and for every 100 females age 18 and over there were 85.8 males age 18 and over.

62.2% of residents lived in urban areas, while 37.8% lived in rural areas.

Of the 644 households, 39.8% had children under the age of 18 living in them, 59.9% were married-couple households, 10.2% were households with a male householder and no spouse or partner present, and 25.9% were households with a female householder and no spouse or partner present. About 18.6% of all households were made up of individuals and 9.4% had someone living alone who was 65 years of age or older.

There were 661 housing units, of which 2.6% were vacant. The homeowner vacancy rate was 1.2% and the rental vacancy rate was 3.1%.

Racial composition as of the 2020 census
Race	Number	Percent
White	1,515	84.9%
Black or African American	18	1.0%
American Indian and Alaska Native	14	0.8%
Asian	15	0.8%
Native Hawaiian and Other Pacific Islander	0	0.0%
Some other race	54	3.0%
Two or more races	169	9.5%
Hispanic or Latino (of any race)	236	13.2%

=== 2000 census ===
As of the census of 2000, 1,433 people, 537 households, and 417 families resided in the city. The population density was 444.8 inhabitants per square mile (171.7/km^{2}). There were 551 housing units at an average density of 171.0 per square mile (66.0/km^{2}). The racial makeup of the city was 94.21% White, 0.98% African American, 0.14% Native American, 0.91% Asian, 3.07% from other races, and 0.70% from two or more races. Hispanics or Latinos of any race were 5.86% of the population.

Of the 537 households, 39.1% had children under the age of 18 living with them, 63.5% were married couples living together, 11.9% had a female householder with no husband present, and 22.3% were not families. About 21.2% of all households were made up of individuals, and 10.1% had someone living alone who was 65 years of age or older. The average household size was 2.67 and the average family size was 3.10.

In the city, the population was distributed as 28.5% under the age of 18, 6.6% from 18 to 24, 29.9% from 25 to 44, 22.6% from 45 to 64, and 12.5% who were 65 years of age or older. The median age was 37 years. For every 100 females, there were 90.8 males. For every 100 females age 18 and over, there were 84.0 males.

The median income for a household in the city was $47,891, and for a family was $54,083. Males had a median income of $37,560 versus $27,647 for females. The per capita income for the city was $19,315. About 3.1% of families and 5.0% of the population were below the poverty line, including 4.4% of those under age 18 and 11.3% of those age 65 or over.

== Education ==
The vast majority of the City of Lorena is within the Lorena Independent School District. The district is home to the Lorena Leopards.

A small piece of Lorena extends into the Bruceville-Eddy Independent School District.

All of McLennan County is in the service area of McLennan Community College.

== History ==
Lorena is named after one of the town's first settlers' oldest daughter, Lorena Westbrook, although its original name was "Aerl Station" after the town's founder, Daniel Aerl.

== Notable person ==
- Holly Tucker, singer
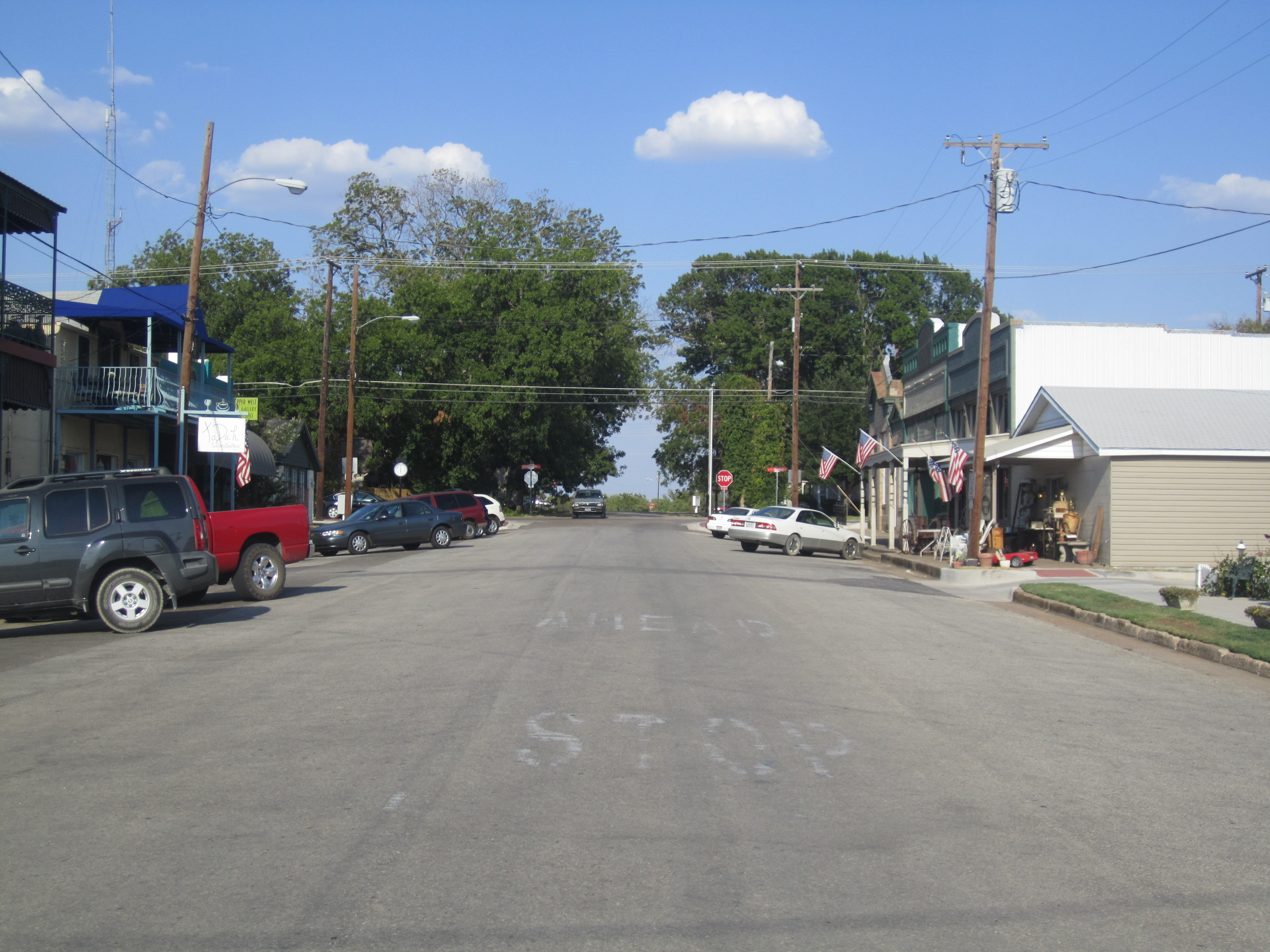
Downtown Lorena

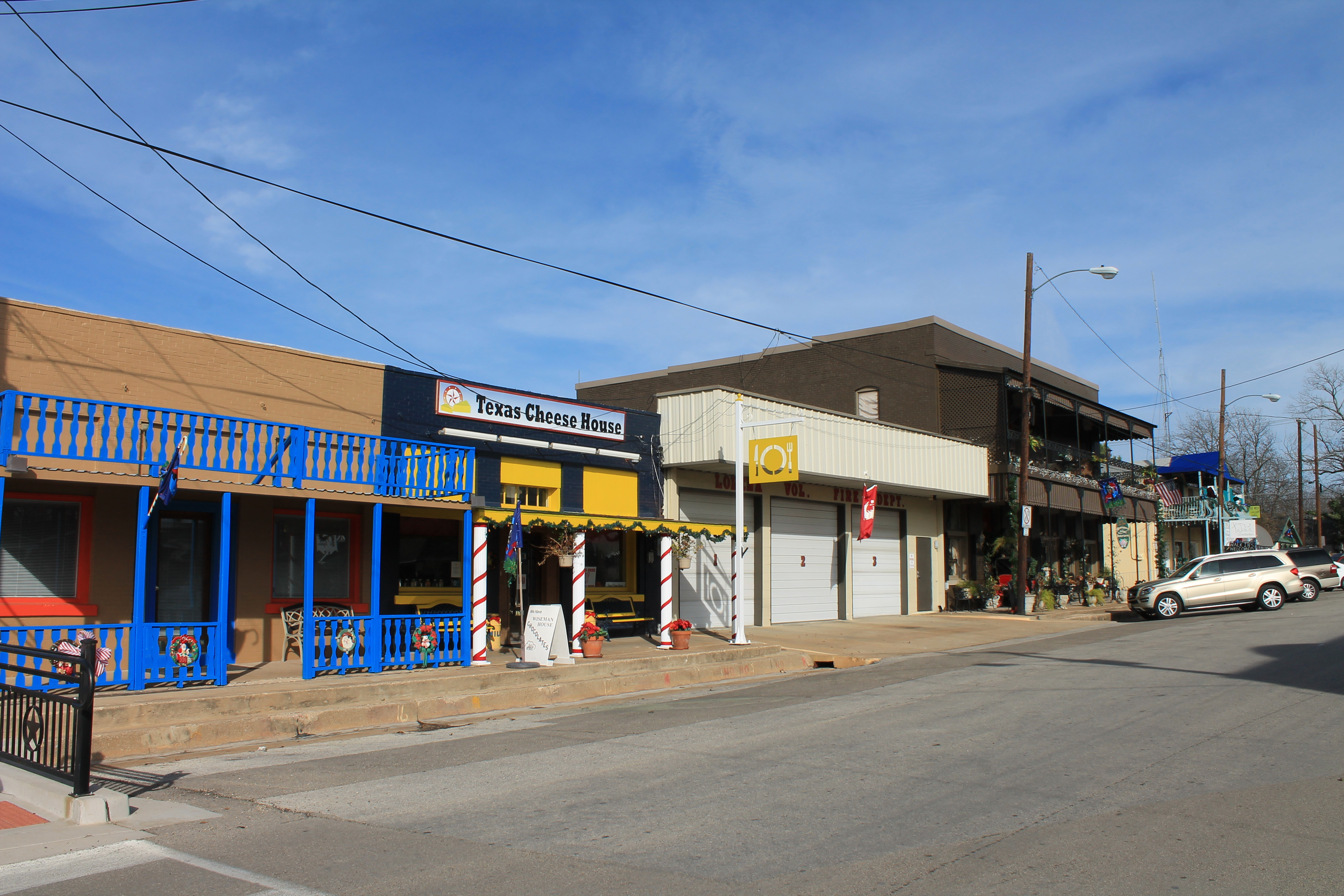
Downtown Lorena

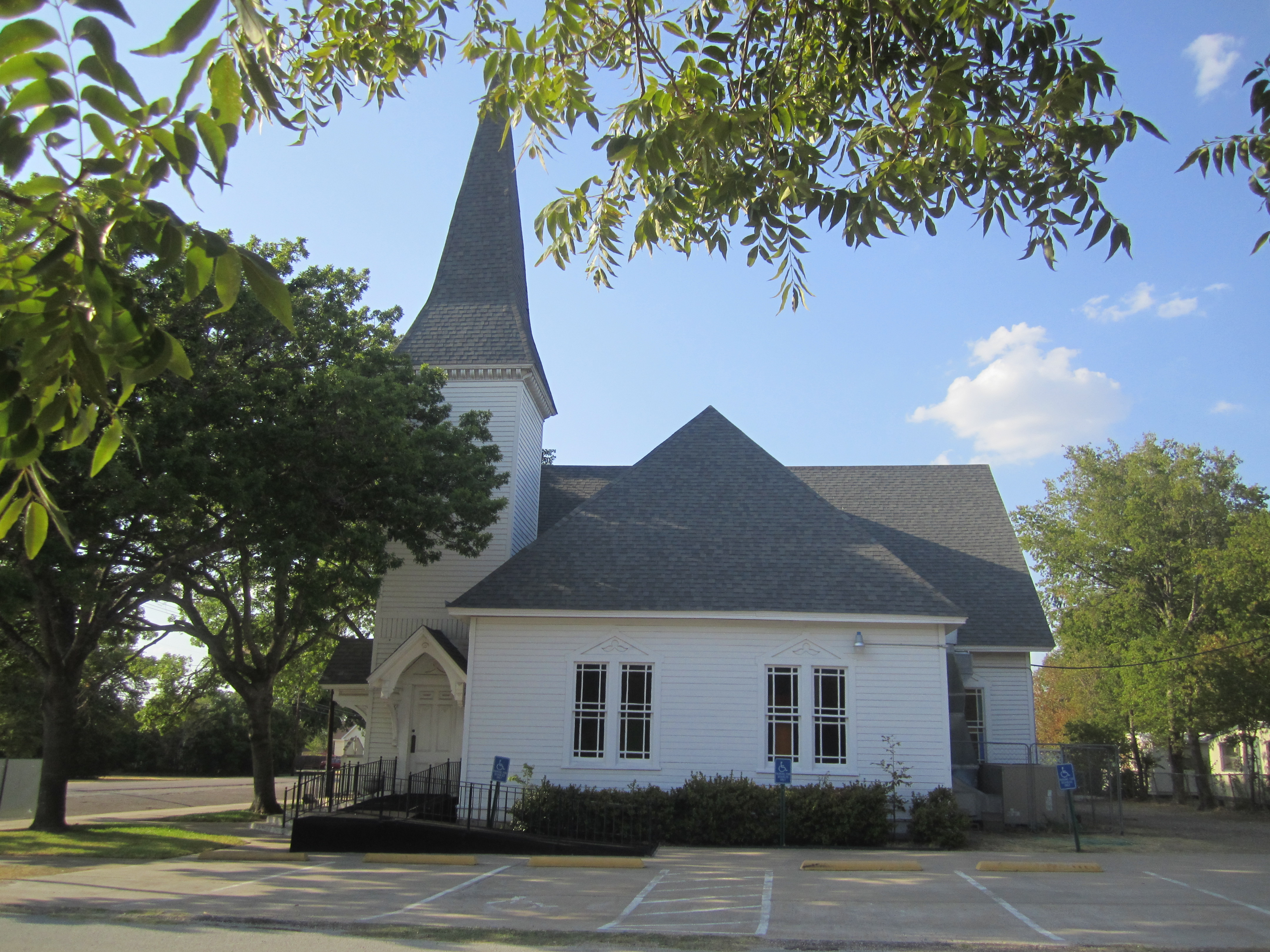
First United Methodist Church in Lorena

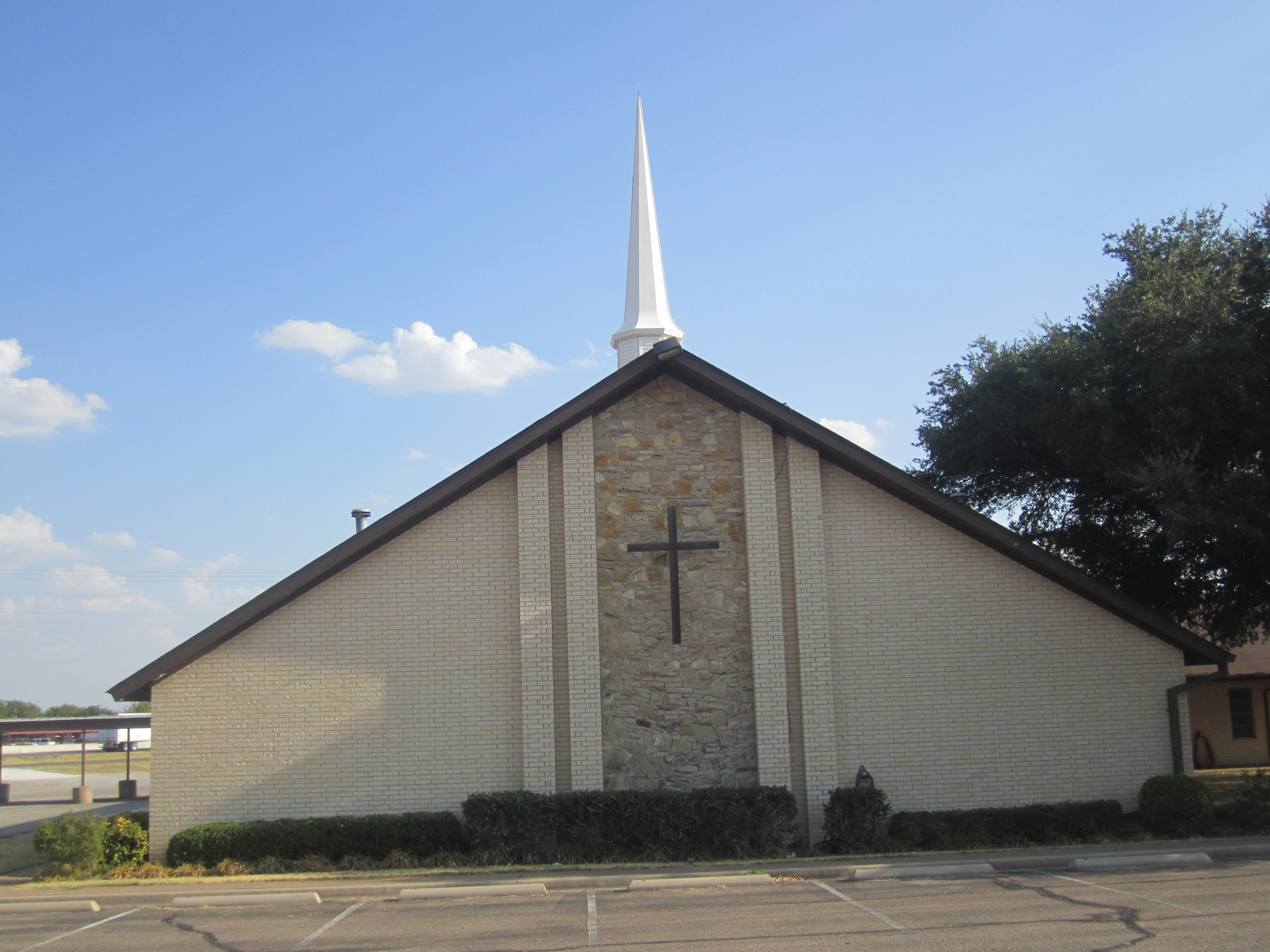
First Baptist Church of Lorena

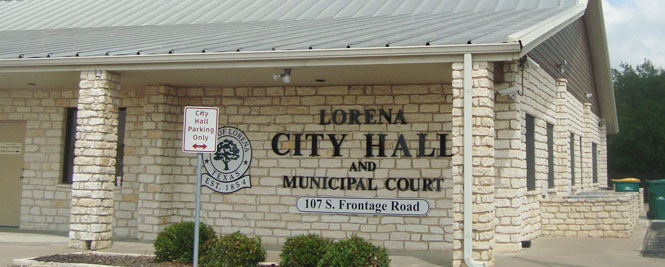
Lorena City Hall
