= Gholson Independent School District =

School district in Texas

Gholson Independent School District is a public school district based in Gholson, Texas USA.

The district has one school that serves students in grades pre-kindergarten through twelve.

In 2009, the school district was rated "recognized" by the Texas Education Agency.

== History ==
At one time the district, which at that point covered grades PK-8, considered consolidating with another school district. Instead it opted to establish a high school.

Prior to 2007 the only athletic program offered at the high school level was basketball. That year Keith Beverly, the newly hired coach, established cross country, track, and volleyball programs. The high school's six-man football team first started playing its games in 2012.

During a period prior to 2014 the district built a stadium for $270,000. In 2014 the district had 250 students.
