= Riesel Independent School District =

School district in Texas

Riesel Independent School District is a public school district based in Riesel, Texas, United States. Located in McLennan County, a small portion of the district extends into Falls County. In 2009, the school district was rated "recognized" by the Texas Education Agency.

== Schools ==
- Riesel High School (grades 7–12)
- Foster Elementary (prekindergarten - grade 6)

== Bond ==
In May 2010, voters approved a $25 million bond for the district, and the school was to construct a new, two-floor high school, add onto its elementary school, relocate and reconstruct a baseball field, and add another softball field, and more.

The school would approve a schematic design in the 2010 school year. New athletic facilities would include 110-seat baseball and softball fields, a new 150-seat gymnasium for the elementary school, and a 954-seat gymnasium for the high school. Improvements would also be done to the football field, including expanding the home bleachers to 1,280 seats.
