= Hewitt, Texas =

- City
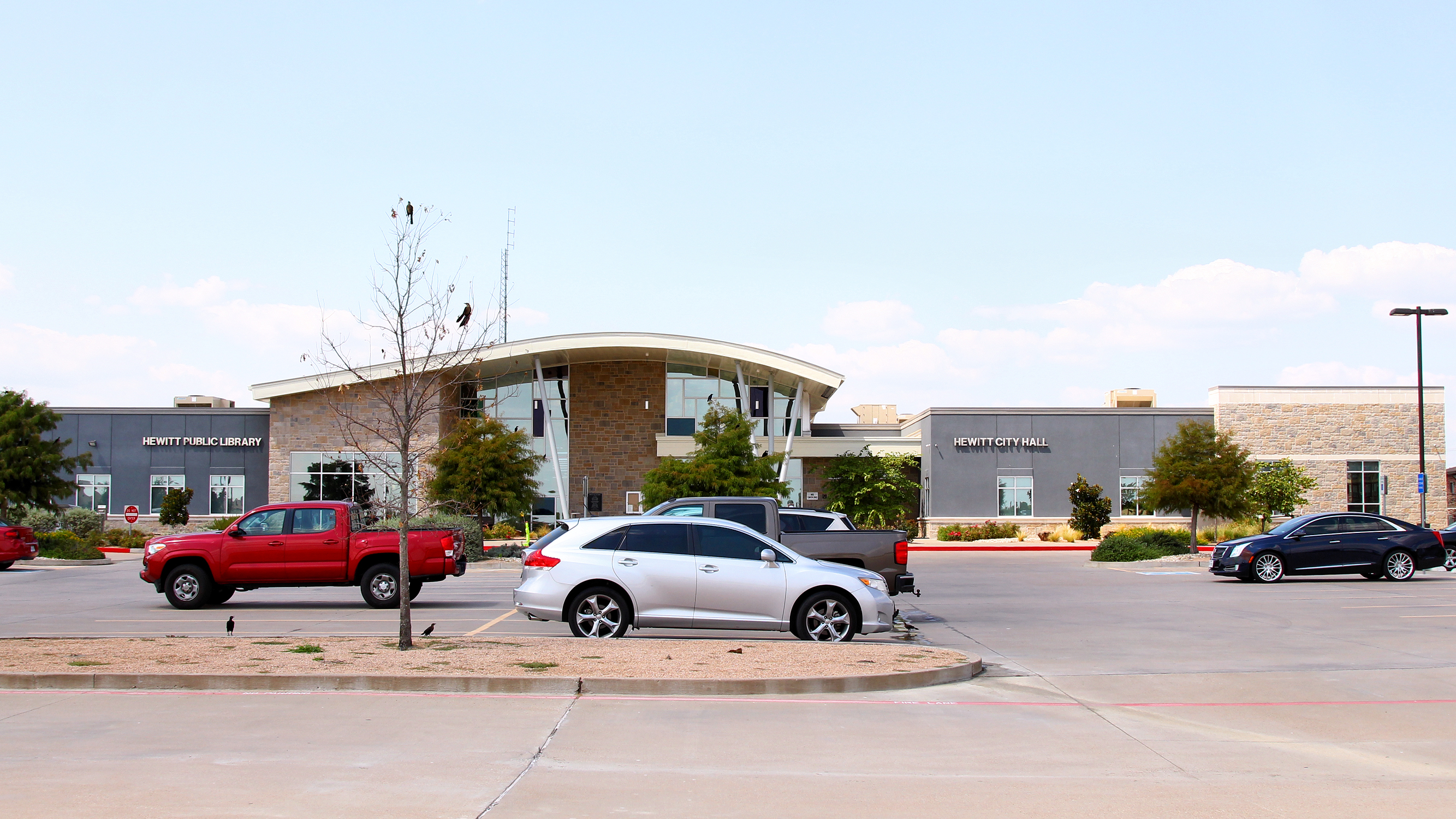
- Hewitt city hall
- Motto: "Life Just Right"
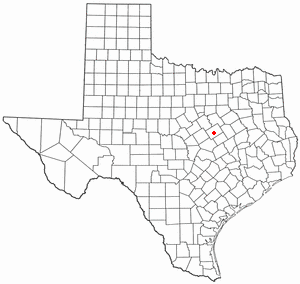
- Location of Hewitt, Texas

- Coordinates: 31°27′05″N 97°11′46″W
- Country: United States
- State: Texas
- County: McLennan

Area
  - Total: 7.03 sq mi (18.21 km^{2})
  - Land: 7.02 sq mi (18.19 km^{2})
  - Water: 0.0039 sq mi (0.01 km^{2})
- Elevation: 627 ft (191 m)

Population (2020)
  - Total: 16,026
  - Density: 2,126.7/sq mi (821.14/km^{2})
- Time zone: UTC-6 (Central (CST))
  - Summer (DST): UTC-5 (CDT)
- ZIP code: 76643
- Area code: 254
- FIPS code: 48-33428
- GNIS feature ID: 2410752
- Website: http://www.cityofhewitt.com/

Hewitt is a city in McLennan County, Texas, United States. The population was 16,026 at the 2020 census, making it the second largest city in the county. It is part of the Waco Metropolitan Statistical Area.

== History ==
The community of Hewitt was established following the donation of land by John A. Warren, the town's first businessman, in the 1880s. Warren purchased roughly 40 acres (16 ha) and the town site was named Hewitt in 1883 for George A. Hewitt, an employee of the Missouri, Kansas and Texas Railroad. During the following decades, the community flourished on farming and agriculture during the days when "cotton was king". Hewitt grew slowly but steadily, incorporating as a city in 1960, and the population skyrocketed in the 1970s. The steady upward growth that continued for more than a century gave way to a 700-percent population boom. In 1890, Hewitt had 60 residents; the town has approximately 13,500 residents as of the 2010 census. In 2015, Hewitt was rated the 20th-best place to live in the United States by MSN Money.

== Geography ==
According to the United States Census Bureau, the city has a total area of 6.9 square miles (18 km^{2}), all land. The city is landlocked by the cities of Robinson and Waco (including its extraterritorial jurisdiction).

=== Climate ===
The climate in this area is characterized by hot, humid summers and generally mild to cool winters. According to the Köppen climate classification, Hewitt has a humid subtropical climate, Cfa on climate maps.

== Demographics ==
Historical population
Census	Pop.	Note	%±
1970	569		—
1980	5,247		822.1%
1990	8,983		71.2%
2000	11,085		23.4%
2010	13,549		22.2%
2020	16,026		18.3%
U.S. Decennial Census

=== 2020 census ===
As of the 2020 census, Hewitt had a population of 16,026. The median age was 42.0 years. 22.0% of residents were under the age of 18 and 22.1% of residents were 65 years of age or older. For every 100 females there were 88.2 males, and for every 100 females age 18 and over there were 84.0 males age 18 and over.

Racial composition as of the 2020 census
Race	Number	Percent
White	11,241	70.1%
Black or African American	1,638	10.2%
American Indian and Alaska Native	78	0.5%
Asian	533	3.3%
Native Hawaiian and Other Pacific Islander	18	0.1%
Some other race	775	4.8%
Two or more races	1,743	10.9%
Hispanic or Latino (of any race)	2,769	17.3%

99.6% of residents lived in urban areas, while 0.4% lived in rural areas.

There were 5,784 households in Hewitt, of which 34.2% had children under the age of 18 living in them. Of all households, 54.6% were married-couple households, 13.0% were households with a male householder and no spouse or partner present, and 26.9% were households with a female householder and no spouse or partner present. About 22.0% of all households were made up of individuals and 9.1% had someone living alone who was 65 years of age or older.

There were 6,020 housing units, of which 3.9% were vacant. The homeowner vacancy rate was 1.4% and the rental vacancy rate was 4.6%.

=== 2000 census ===
As of the census of 2000, 11,085 people, 3,931 households, and 3,223 families resided in the city. The population density was 1,608.0 inhabitants per square mile (620.9/km^{2}). The 4,018 housing units averaged 582.9 per square mile (225.2/km^{2}). The racial makeup of the city was 84.08% White, 7.70% African American, 0.42% Native American, 2.35% Asian, 0.06% Pacific Islander, 4.02% from other races, and 1.37% from two or more races. Hispanics or Latinos of any race were 9.28% of the population.

Of the 3,931 households, 45.6% had children under the age of 18 living with them, 68.3% were married couples living together, 10.9% had a female householder with no husband present, and 18.0% were not families. About 14.2% of all households were made up of individuals, and 3.3% had someone living alone who was 65 years of age or older. The average household size was 2.82 and the average family size was 3.12.

In the city, the population was distributed as 29.9% under the age of 18, 7.6% from 18 to 24, 33.0% from 25 to 44, 22.8% from 45 to 64, and 6.7% who were 65 years of age or older. The median age was 33 years. For every 100 females, there were 94.9 males. For every 100 females age 18 and over, there were 91.2 males.

The median income for a household in the city was $55,469, and for a family was $59,409. Males had a median income of $38,560 versus $24,659 for females. The per capita income for the city was $22,263. About 2.2% of families and 2.9% of the population were below the poverty line, including 3.1% of those under age 18 and 4.0% of those age 65 or over.

Hewitt was ranked number 44 on Money magazine's 2007 Top 100 places to live.

== Education ==
The vast majority of the city of Hewitt is within the Midway Independent School District. There are three elementary schools, half of the district's total, and one of its two middle schools in the city.

A small piece is in the Lorena Independent School District.

All of McLennan County is in the service area of McLennan Community College.

== Culture ==
Hewitt was the birthplace of the late U.S. Senator Tom Connally of Texas.
