= Woodway, Texas =

- City
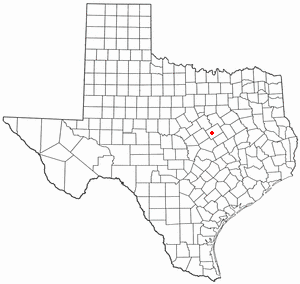
- Location of Woodway, Texas

- Coordinates: 31°30′05″N 97°13′52″W
- Country: United States
- State: Texas
- County: McLennan

Area
  - Total: 6.58 sq mi (17.05 km^{2})
  - Land: 6.57 sq mi (17.01 km^{2})
  - Water: 0.015 sq mi (0.04 km^{2})
- Elevation: 653 ft (199 m)

Population (2020)
  - Total: 9,383
  - Density: 1,374/sq mi (530.4/km^{2})
- Time zone: UTC-6 (Central (CST))
  - Summer (DST): UTC-5 (CDT)
- ZIP code: 76712
- Area code: 254
- FIPS code: 48-80224
- GNIS feature ID: 2412306
- Website: https://www.woodwaytexas.gov

Woodway is a city in McLennan County, Texas, United States. The population was 9,383 at the 2020 census. It is part of the Waco Metropolitan Statistical Area.

== History ==
Originally founded in 1865 by Confederate veteran Burl Kendrick, Woodway was named by a committee of citizens in the early 1950s. Following the Supreme Court decisions Brown v. Board of Education and Brown II, the city of Waco mounted an attempt to desegregate the public school system. In response to the integration attempts, residents incorporated on June 20, 1955, under the name "Woodway," a portmanteau of the area's existing place names, Woodland West and the Village of Midway.

== Geography ==
According to the United States Census Bureau, the city has a total area of 6.6 square miles (17.1 km^{2}), all land.

== Demographics ==
Historical population
Census	Pop.	Note	%±
1960	1,244		—
1970	4,819		287.4%
1980	7,091		47.1%
1990	8,695		22.6%
2000	8,733		0.4%
2010	8,452		−3.2%
2020	9,383		11.0%
U.S. Decennial Census

=== 2020 census ===
As of the 2020 census, Woodway had a population of 9,383, and the median age was 44.7 years. 24.4% of residents were under the age of 18 and 26.3% of residents were 65 years of age or older. For every 100 females there were 91.8 males, and for every 100 females age 18 and over there were 88.4 males age 18 and over.

100.0% of residents lived in urban areas, while 0.0% lived in rural areas.

There were 3,449 households in Woodway, of which 33.3% had children under the age of 18 living in them. Of all households, 68.1% were married-couple households, 8.3% were households with a male householder and no spouse or partner present, and 21.2% were households with a female householder and no spouse or partner present. About 18.3% of all households were made up of individuals and 12.8% had someone living alone who was 65 years of age or older.

There were 3,644 housing units, of which 5.4% were vacant. The homeowner vacancy rate was 2.8% and the rental vacancy rate was 10.0%.

Racial composition as of the 2020 census
Race	Number	Percent
White	7,620	81.2%
Black or African American	414	4.4%
American Indian and Alaska Native	44	0.5%
Asian	231	2.5%
Native Hawaiian and Other Pacific Islander	2	0.0%
Some other race	219	2.3%
Two or more races	853	9.1%
Hispanic or Latino (of any race)	991	10.6%

=== 2000 census ===
As of the census of 2000, there were 8,733 people, 3,382 households, and 2,759 families residing in the city. Of this population 49.38% were male and 50.62% were female. The population density was 1,324.1 inhabitants per square mile (511.2/km^{2}). There were 3,481 housing units at an average density of 527.8 per square mile (203.8/km^{2}). The racial makeup of the city was 93.71% White, 2.23% African American, 0.21% Native American, 1.87% Asian, 0.05% Pacific Islander, 1.11% from other races, and 0.82% from two or more races. Hispanic or Latino of any race were 3.78% of the population.

There were 3,382 households, out of which 31.9% had children under the age of 18 living with them, 75.1% were married couples living together, 5.1% had a female householder with no husband present, and 18.4% were non-families. 16.1% of all households were made up of individuals, and 7.0% had someone living alone who was 65 years of age or older. The average household size was 2.58 and the average family size was 2.88.

In the city, the population was spread out, with 23.9% under the age of 18, 5.8% from 18 to 24, 21.3% from 25 to 44, 33.5% from 45 to 64, and 15.6% who were 65 years of age or older. The median age was 44 years. For every 100 females, there were 97.5 males.

The median income for a household in the city was $70,139, and the median income for a family was $80,161. Males had a median income of $57,363 versus $30,822 for females. The per capita income for the city was $36,306. About 2.6% of families and 2.8% of the population were below the poverty line, including 2.7% of those under age 18 and 2.9% of those age 65 or over.

== Arts and culture ==
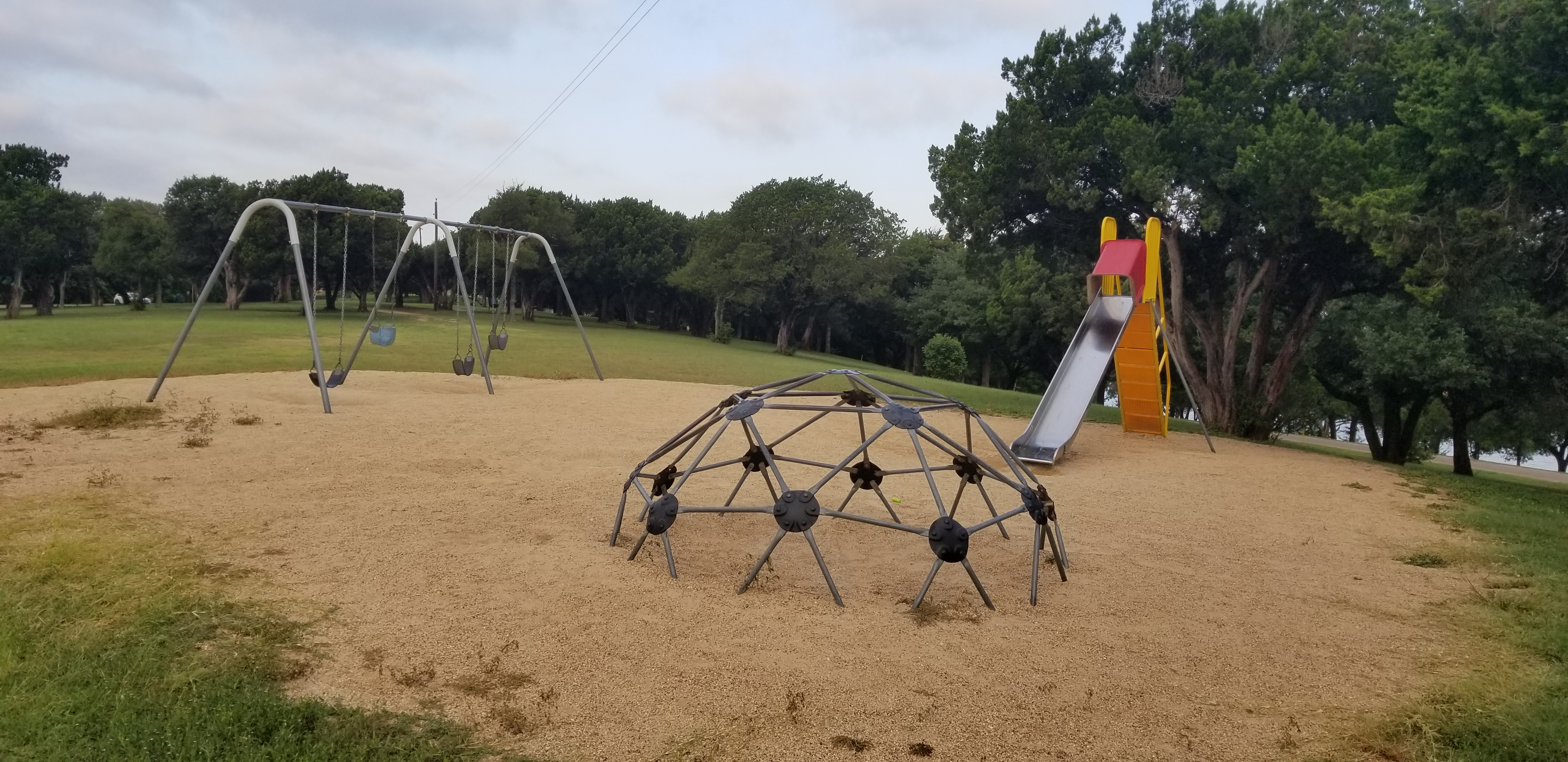
Woodway Park

The Carleen Bright Arboretum is a 15 acres (61,000 m^{2}) arboretum containing 6 acres (24,000 m^{2}) of gardens, an amphitheater with covered gazebo, a chapel, and a rental facility. Cardinals, the official bird of Woodway, are sometimes seen in the arboretum.

== Education ==
The city of Woodway is divided between the Midway Independent School District (the vast majority) and the Waco Independent School District.

The portion in Waco ISD is zoned to the following: Parkdale Elementary School, Tennyson Middle School, and Waco High School.

All of McLennan County is in the service area of McLennan Community College.
