= Washington Avenue Bridge (Waco, Texas) =

- U.S. National Register of Historic Places
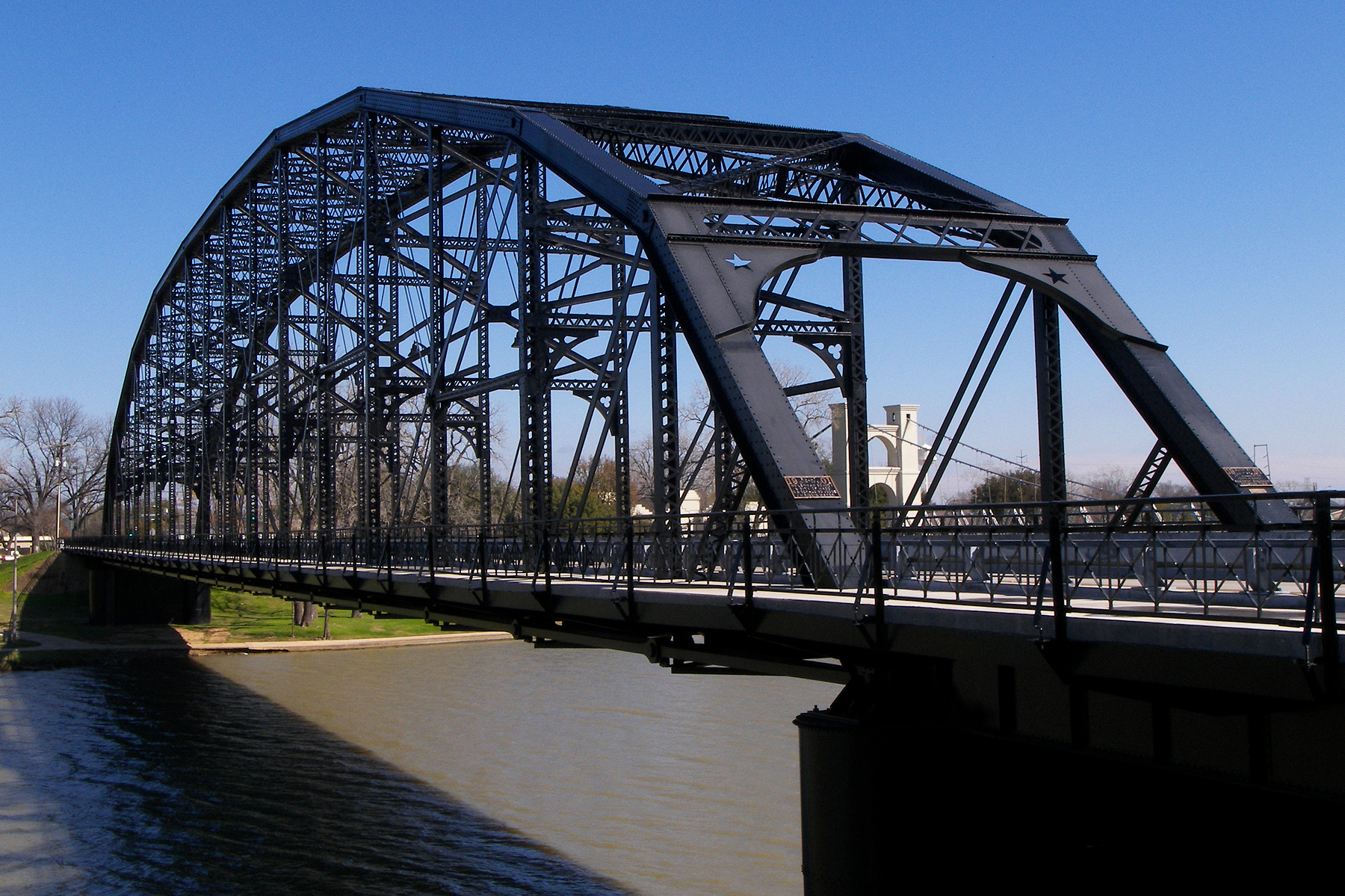
- Washington Avenue Bridge in 2012

- Location within Texas Location within the United States
- Location: Washington and Elm Aves. across Brazos River, Waco, Texas
- Coordinates: 31°33′40″N 97°7′43″W
- Area: less than one acre
- Built: 1902
- Architect: J.H. Sparks
- Architectural style: Pennsylvania through-truss
- NRHP reference No.: 98000143
- Added to NRHP: February 20, 1998

The Washington Avenue Bridge in Waco, Texas was built in 1902 and was then the longest single-span vehicular truss bridge in Texas. It has a 450-foot (140 m) span across the Brazos River. It provided for traffic circulation in addition to that provided by the 1870-built Waco Suspension Bridge one block downriver (east).

The bridge cost $93,399 for its construction, not including $1,850 for railings and approach spans. Its cost was split by McLennan County and the City of Waco, which became equal owners.

A Black man named Sank Majors was lynched at the bridge in 1905, hung from a crossbeam by a white mob. Another Black man, Jim Lawyer, was attacked for objecting to the lynching. Texas Rangers looked on the violence and did not intervene.

The bridge was listed on the National Register of Historic Places in 1998.

== See also ==
- National Register of Historic Places listings in McLennan County, Texas
- List of bridges on the National Register of Historic Places in Texas
