= KLTO (FM) =

- Moody, Texas; United States
- Broadcast area: Waco metropolitan area
- Frequency: 99.1 MHz
- Branding: Latino 93.5 y 99.1

Programming
- Format: Spanish Top 40 (CHR)
- Affiliations: Premiere Networks

Ownership
- Owner: Prophesy Media Group; (Waco Entertainment Group, LLC.)
- Sister stations: KWPW, KWOW, KIXT

History
- First air date: December 3, 2018
- Call sign meaning: LaTinO (station branding)

Technical information
- Licensing authority: FCC
- Facility ID: 198733
- Class: A
- ERP: 2,950 watts
- HAAT: 144 meters (472 ft)
- Transmitter coordinates: 31°17′51.40″N 97°36′42.90″W
- Translator: See § Translator
- Repeater: 107.9 KWPW-HD2 (Robinson)

Links
- Public license information: Public file; LMS
- Website: KLTO Online

KLTO (99.1 MHz) is an FM radio station broadcasting a Spanish language top 40 (CHR) format to the Waco-Temple, Texas area. The station is owned by Waco Entertainment Group, LLC The transmitter is near Flat, Texas in Coryell County.

== Translator ==
Broadcast translator for KWPW-HD2
Call sign	Frequency	City of license	FID	FCC info
K228FK	93.5 FM	Waco, Texas	149227	LMS
