= Texas State Technical College =

Public community college near Waco, Texas, US

Coordinates: 32.5066°N 96.7985°W

- Motto: Placing more Texans in great paying jobs
- Type: Public technical college
- Established: 1969
- Chancellor: Michael L. Reeser
- Students: 11,919
- Location: Waco, Texas, United States
- Campus: Urban, 268 acre (8.9 km^{2})
- Website: www.tstc.edu

Texas State Technical College (TSTC) is a public technical college with its main campus in Waco, Texas. TSTC is the State of Texas's only public multicampus technical college, offering associate degrees and certificates in technical skills and trades on 11 campuses throughout the state. TSTC's headquarters are located north of Waco and are co-located with the Waco campus, the oldest TSTC location and flagship location. TSTC also operates campuses in Harlingen, Marshall, Red Oak, Abilene, Breckenridge, Brownwood, Sweetwater, Williamson County, and Fort Bend County.

== History ==
TSTC was established in 1965 as the James Connally Technical Institute (JCTI) of Texas A&M University to meet the state's evolving workforce needs. At the time, Governor John Connally (no relation) predicted that it would be "the most sophisticated technical-vocational institute in the country."

In 1967, JCTI expanded to include a South Texas campus in Harlingen.

In 1969, the JCTI colleges separated from Texas A&M University and became an independent state system, with its own board of regents, taking the name Texas State Technical Institute. Texas State Technical Institute-Waco (TSTI-Waco) was the first school in the United States to offer an associate of applied science degree in laser electro-optics technology. The program began in September 1969. The name changed to its present one in 1991.

As the need for technical education increased in Texas, TSTC opened additional campuses in Amarillo (this campus later left TSTI to become part of Amarillo College) and Sweetwater in 1979, McAllen (1983, no longer part of the system), Abilene (1985), Breckenridge (1989), Brownwood (1991), and Marshall (1991; became a separate college in 1999).

On September 1, 1999, the Marshall extension center was officially designated a stand-alone campus by the Texas Legislature, and it became known as Texas State Technical College Marshall. In 2011, the Legislature redefined the TSTC West Texas campus as one that serves West Texas with four strategically positioned, permanent locations at Sweetwater, Abilene, Breckenridge, and Brownwood. In 2013, the Texas Legislature authorized the creation of an extension center in Ellis County creating TSTC Marshall North Texas Extension Center also known as TSTC North Texas.

In 2015, TSTC and the Greater Fort Bend Economic Development Council unveiled plans to build a permanent campus in Rosenberg. The grand opening was celebrated in the fall a year later, bringing manufacturing, engineering, and information technology programs to the community.

TSTC collaborates with educational partners from throughout Texas to bring additional educational options to students. TSTC has partnerships in Hutto and Richmond working closely with a number of universities, school districts, colleges, and other entities to help provide a strong workforce for the future of Texas.

== Academics ==
TSTC is a technical college designed to provide vocational and technical education to people entering the workforce or in the midst of a career change. As such, it primarily offers the Associate of Applied Science (AAS) degree, along with certificates of completion in various fields. In 2009, TSTC Harlingen received approval from the Texas Legislature and Texas Higher Education Coordinating Board to add associate of science (AS) degrees to its traditional offerings for those students desiring to transfer to a university or enter the workforce directly with an associate of science in biology, computer science, engineering, mathematics, physics, nursing preparatory, and health professions. Additionally, the Harlingen college began offering fields of study in combination with the academic core, which when transferred to a Texas public college or university, can substitute for freshman and sophomore major requirements.

The college is accredited to award AAS degrees and certificates of completion by the Commission on Colleges of the Southern Association of Colleges and Schools.

== Governance ==
The Texas State Technical College is governed by a nine-member board of regents and operated under the direction of a chancellor. These regents, who provide a statewide perspective, are appointed by the governor to six-year terms. The board meets quarterly to provide leadership and enact policies for the successful management and operation of the system. The colleges operate under the rules and regulations of the Texas Higher Education Coordinating Board. The Texas State Technical College Chancellor is Michael L. Reeser.

== Campuses ==
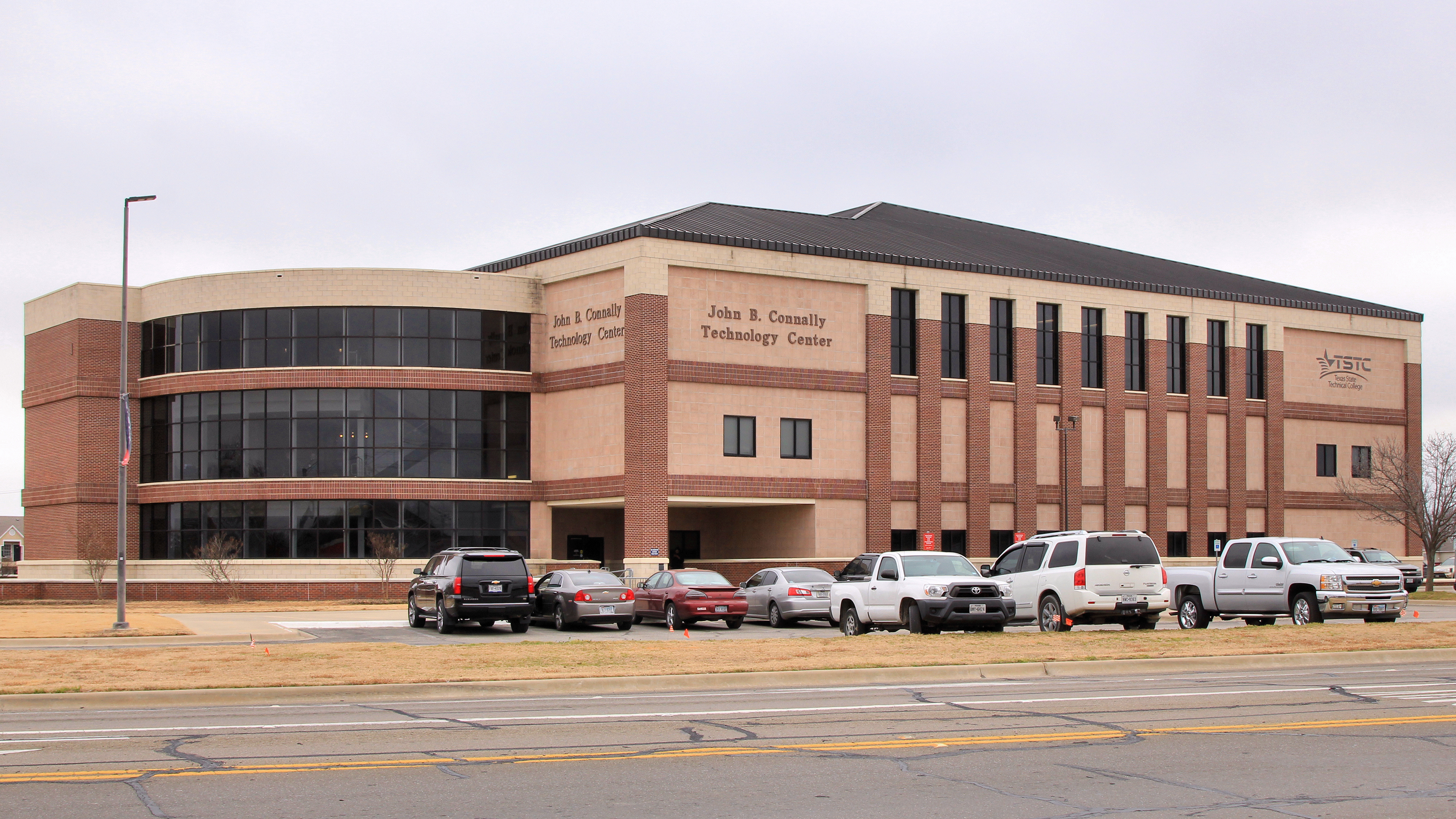
The John B. Connally Technology Center at the Waco campus

=== Permanent campuses ===
Campus	Location	Enrollment (fall 2019)
Fort Bend County	Rosenberg	581
Harlingen	Harlingen	4,394
Marshall	Marshall	628
North Texas	Red Oak	248
Waco (Flagship)	Waco	4,045
West Texas	Abilene	2,023
West Texas	Breckenridge	2,023
West Texas	Brownwood	2,023
West Texas	Sweetwater	2,023

=== Extension center ===
TSTC administers an extension center in partnership with Temple College at the East Williamson County Higher Education Center in Williamson County.

== Wind power ==
In response to the growing need for technical training involving wind power, TSTC Sweetwater created the first community college wind-energy program in Texas, and constructed a demonstration 2 MW 60 Hz DeWind D8.2 prototype wind turbine for student training in 2007. Texas State Technical College has partnered with Pinnacle Career Institute in Kansas City to offer the wind turbine technician program.
