= KBCT =

KBCT may refer to:

- Boca Raton Airport, the airport serving Boca Raton, Florida assigned the ICAO code KBCT
- KWBT (FM), the Waco, Texas radio station which previously had the callsign KBCT
- KBCT, a radio station in Missouri
