= National Register of Historic Places listings in McLennan County, Texas =

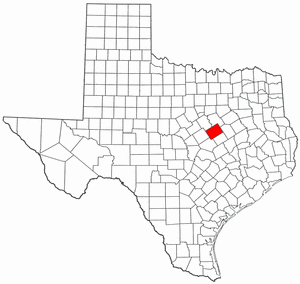
Location of McLennan County in Texas

This is a list of the National Register of Historic Places listings in McLennan County, Texas.

This is intended to be a complete list of properties and districts listed on the National Register of Historic Places in McLennan County, Texas. Four districts, 20 individual properties, and one former property are listed on the National Register in the county. Two individually listed properties are State Antiquities Landmarks, including one that is also a Recorded Texas Historic Landmark (RTHL) along with seven other individual properties designated as RTHLs. Two districts contain several more RTHLs.

This National Park Service list is complete through NPS recent listings posted January 23, 2026.

== Current listings ==
The publicly disclosed locations of National Register properties and districts may be seen in a mapping service provided.

	Name on the Register	Image	Date listed	Location	City or town	Description
1	Artesian Manufacturing and Bottling Company Building	Artesian Manufacturing and Bottling Company Building	May 26, 1983 (#83003152)	300 S. 5th St. 31°33′18″N 97°07′47″W	Waco	Part of Waco Downtown Historic District, currently houses the Dr Pepper Museum
2	Castle Heights Historic District	Castle Heights Historic District	November 17, 2009 (#07000495)	Roughly bounded by Waco Dr. (U.S. Route 84), Oriental Rd., Franklin Ave., and 39th St. 31°31′58″N 97°09′40″W	Waco	Includes Recorded Texas Historic Landmark (RTHL)
3	Madison Cooper House	Madison Cooper House	July 8, 1982 (#82004514)	1801 Austin Ave. 31°32′46″N 97°08′39″W	Waco	
4	Earle-Napier-Kinnard House	Earle-Napier-Kinnard House	March 11, 1971 (#71001017)	814 S. 4th St. 31°34′43″N 97°07′21″W	Waco	RHTL
5	Forsgard Homestead	Forsgard Homestead	November 13, 2003 (#03001161)	1116-1122 N. 4th St. 31°33′51″N 97°08′24″W	Waco	RHTL
6	Fort House	Fort House	October 15, 1970 (#70000849)	503 E. 4th St. 31°33′14″N 97°07′35″W	Waco	RTHL
7	H.E.B. Grocery (Waco Store #1)		January 26, 2026 (#100012616)	1726 Austin Avenue; 31°32′48″N 97°08′36″W	Waco	
8	Hippodrome	Hippodrome	April 28, 1983 (#83003153)	724 Austin Ave. 31°33′16″N 97°08′03″W	Waco	RTHL, part of Waco Downtown Historic District
9	William Decker Johnson Hall		March 3, 2025 (#100011472)	1020 Elm Avenue; 31°34′17″N 97°07′18″W	Waco	William Decker Johnson (bishop)
10	John Wesley Mann House	John Wesley Mann House	April 19, 1972 (#72001466)	100 Mill St. 31°34′02″N 97°08′01″W	Waco	RTHL
11	McLennan County Courthouse	McLennan County Courthouse	December 14, 1978 (#78003095)	Public Square; 31°33′26″N 97°08′01″W	Waco	State Antiquities Landmark, RTHL, part of Waco Downtown Historic District
12	McCulloch House	McCulloch House	September 14, 1972 (#72001467)	406 Columbus Ave. 31°33′32″N 97°07′58″W	Waco	Recorded Texas Historic Landmark
13	McDermott Motors Building	McDermott Motors Building	January 14, 2004 (#03001415)	1125 Washington Ave. 31°33′08″N 97°08′22″W	Waco	Part of Waco Downtown Historic District
14	Praetorian Building	Praetorian Building	July 26, 1984 (#84001911)	601 Franklin Ave. 31°33′18″N 97°07′55″W	Waco	Part of Waco Downtown Historic District
15	Rotan-Dossett House	Rotan-Dossett House	January 29, 1979 (#79003151)	1503 Columbus Ave. 31°33′01″N 97°08′35″W	Waco	RTHL
16	St. James Methodist Episcopal Church	St. James Methodist Episcopal Church	September 12, 2019 (#100004374)	600 South Second St. 31°33′18″N 97°07′26″W	Waco	
17	Texas Textile Mills-L.L. Sams Company Historic District	Texas Textile Mills-L.L. Sams Company Historic District	December 13, 2004 (#03000807)	2100 River St. 31°32′42″N 97°06′31″W	Waco	
18	Torrey's Trading House No. 2 Site	Torrey's Trading House No. 2 Site	June 5, 1975 (#75002074)	Address restricted	Waco	
19	Veterans Administration Hospital Historic District	Veterans Administration Hospital Historic District	July 18, 1994 (#94000672)	4800 Memorial Dr. 31°30′40″N 97°09′54″W	Waco	
20	Waco Downtown Historic District	Waco Downtown Historic District	February 3, 2012 (#11001094)	Roughly bounded by Mary Ave., S. 14th St., Columbus Ave., and S. University Parks Dr. 31°33′18″N 97°08′02″W	Waco	Includes State Antiquities Landmark, RTHLs
21	Waco Drug Company	Waco Drug Company	March 24, 2008 (#08000241)	225 S. 5th St. 31°33′19″N 97°07′50″W	Waco	Part of Waco Downtown Historic District
22	Waco High School	Waco High School	March 17, 2009 (#09000140)	815 Columbus; 31°33′22″N 97°08′15″W	Waco	Part of Waco Downtown Historic District
23	Waco Suspension Bridge	Waco Suspension Bridge	June 22, 1970 (#70000850)	At Bridge St., over the Brazos River; 31°33′40″N 97°07′39″W	Waco	State Antiquities Landmark
24	Washington Avenue Bridge	Washington Avenue Bridge	February 20, 1998 (#98000143)	Washington and Elm Aves. across the Brazos River; 31°33′40″N 97°07′43″W	Waco	

== Former listing ==
	Name on the Register	Image	Date listed	Date removed	Location	City or town	Description
1	Brown-Mann House	Brown-Mann House	October 22, 1987 (#87001887)	June 27, 2014	725 W. Sixth St. 31°26′06″N 97°24′30″W	McGregor	Destroyed by fire February 24, 2014

== See also ==
- National Register of Historic Places listings in Texas
- Recorded Texas Historic Landmarks in McLennan County
