= KWBT =

KWBT may refer to:

- KWBT (FM), a radio station (94.5 FM) licensed to serve Waco, Texas, United States
- KRMX (FM), a radio station (104.9 FM) licensed to serve Bellmead, Texas, which held the call sign KWBT from 2010 to 2013
- KQCW-DT, a television station (channel 20/PSIP 19) licensed to serve Muskogee, Oklahoma, United States, which held the call sign KWBT from 1999 to 2006
- KWBT, branding for a former cable-only service of KAEF-TV, in Eureka, California
