= KLTO =

KLTO may refer to:

- KLTO (FM), a radio station (99.1 FM) licensed to serve Moody, Texas, United States
- KDRN, a radio station (1230 AM) licensed to serve Del Rio, Texas, which held the call sign KLTO from 2012 to 2018
- KZAR, a radio station (97.7 FM) licensed to serve McQueeney, Texas, which held the call sign KLTO from 2005 to 2011
