= Waco Boating and Fishing Club =

The Waco Boating and Fishing Club was the first social club in the history of Waco, Texas, in existence from 1890 to 1988.

== History ==
The Waco Boating and Fishing Club was first proposed on January 10, 1890, by prominent Waco citizens. A month later, the club was chartered by the state with 50 initial members. The club purchased a 50-acre site at a cost of $2,000 upon which to construct their headquarters, which they named "Fountain Lake". They constructed a dam, dug an artesian well, and created a pond which they stocked with fish. The club's name was soon changed to the "Fish Pond Club", and it would keep this name for the rest of its existence.

The group renewed their state charter after its expiration in 1916. Over this time period, the club became a popular Waco gathering point, hosting dinners and social events open to members and, for a fee, non-members. Because of this popularity, the need for improvements, and increasing competition from the newly founded Ridgewood Country Club, in 1947 the group decided to construct a new clubhouse. Thirty years after the new clubhouse's construction, the club again decided to build a new clubhouse at the cost of $500,000. The plan proposed massive improvements including a swimming pool, tennis courts, playground, and new parking. To raise the funds for the improvements, the club raised dues on members several times and took out loans. The new clubhouse was opened in 1979.

=== Dissolution ===
Despite the construction of the new clubhouse, the club was soon dissolved in 1988. The reason for the dissolution are not entirely known. The decision to dissolve was made by a vote of the board of directors, who sold all remaining club property to the Ridgewood Country Club. The remaining landmarks of the club are a Texas Historical Marker and the road named for the club, Fish Pond Road.
