= KWPW =

Radio station in Robinson–Waco, Texas

- Robinson, Texas; United States
- Broadcast area: Waco, Texas
- Frequency: 107.9 MHz (HD Radio)
- Branding: 107.9 The Bull

Programming
- Format: Classic country
- Subchannels: HD2: KLTO simulcast (Spanish CHR)
- Affiliations: Premiere Networks; Westwood One

Ownership
- Owner: Prophecy Media Group; (Waco Entertainment Group, LLC)
- Sister stations: KWOW, KIXT, KLTO

History
- First air date: 1972 (as KCIR Corsicana)
- Former call signs: KCIR (1972–1983); KXCL-FM (1983–1985); KAND-FM (1985–1994); KICI-FM (1994–1998); KDXX-FM (1998–2002); KDOS (2002–2005); KHCK-FM (2005–2010)
- Call sign meaning: Waco's PoWer (previous format)

Technical information
- Licensing authority: FCC
- Facility ID: 57377
- Class: A
- ERP: 6,000 watts
- HAAT: 100 meters (330 ft)
- Transmitter coordinates: 31°30′33.00″N 97°10′3.00″W
- Translator: HD2: See KLTO (FM) § Translator

Links
- Public license information: Public file; LMS

KWPW (107.9 FM, "107.9 The Bull") is a radio station broadcasting a classic country format. Licensed to Robinson, Texas, United States, the station serves the Waco area. The station is currently owned by Bill McCutcheon. Its studios are located in Waco, and its transmitter is located in Waco near the VA Hospital.

== History ==
The station began in 1972 as KCIR in Corsicana Texas. The call letters stood for "The Golden 'CIR'cle". It was assigned the call letters KXCL-FM on April 12, 1983. On February 1, 1985, the station changed its call sign to KAND-FM, matching the AM sister station on 1340. After its purchase by Marcos A. Rodriguez in 1994, the call sign was changed on January 19 to KICI-FM, then again on February 20, 1998 to KDXX-FM. In 2001, KDXX applied for and was granted a move from Corsicana to better serve Waco, Texas. It was relicensed to Robinson, Texas as it is currently. On January 11, 2002 the calls changed to KDOS, on April 30, 2005 to KHCK, and on August 27, 2010 to the current KWPW.

On September 14, 2024, KWPW changed their format from top 40/CHR to classic country, branded as "107.9 The Bull", effectively making KWTX-FM the only CHR station in the Waco, Texas radio market.

== KWPW-HD2 ==
On August 7, 2017, KWPW launched a Spanish CHR format on its HD2 subchannel, branded as "Latino 93.5" (simulcast on FM translator K228FK 93.5 FM Waco).
