= Texas State Technical College – Waco =

Coordinates: 31.639362°N 97.084822°W

Texas State Technical College of Waco is a public technical college in Waco, Texas. It was founded in 1965 as the James Connally Technical Institute of Texas A&M University.

Texas State Technical College is the only state-supported technical college system in Texas, and is accredited by the Commission on Colleges of the Southern Association of Colleges and Schools. Its campus offers student housing, cafeteria, activities center, and a gymnasium.
