= KWOW =

- Clifton, Texas; United States
- Broadcast area: Waco metropolitan area
- Frequency: 104.1 MHz
- Branding: La Ley 104.1

Programming
- Format: Regional Mexican

Ownership
- Owner: Prophesy Media Group; (Waco Entertainment Group, LLC)
- Sister stations: KIXT, KWPW, KLTO

History
- First air date: September 5, 1990 (36 years ago)

Technical information
- Licensing authority: FCC
- Facility ID: 6449
- Class: C2
- ERP: 16,000 watts
- HAAT: 140 meters (460 ft)
- Transmitter coordinates: 31°44′5.00″N 97°19′17.00″W

Links
- Public license information: Public file; LMS
- Website: www.1041laley.com

KWOW (104.1 MHz) is a commercial FM radio station broadcasting a Regional Mexican radio format. Licensed to Clifton, Texas, United States, the station serves the Waco metropolitan area and is known as "La Ley 104.1" (The Law). The station is currently owned by Waco Entertainment Group, LLC. Its studios are located in Waco, and its transmitter is located northeast of Valley Mills, Texas.
