= Waco Suspension Bridge =

- Coordinates: 31°33′40″N 97°07′39″W
- Carries: Foot traffic (Vehicles, stagecoaches, and cattle until 1971)
- Crosses: Brazos River
- Locale: Bridge St., Waco, Texas, United States

Characteristics
- Design: Suspension bridge
- Longest span: 475 feet (145 m)

History
- Architect: Thomas M. Griffith
- Constructed by: John A. Roebling Co.
- Opened: 1870; 156 years ago
- Waco Suspension Bridge
- U.S. National Register of Historic Places
- Texas State Antiquities Landmark
- Location within Texas Location within the United States
- Coordinates: 31°33′40″N 97°7′39″W
- Area: 8 acres (3.2 ha)
- Built: 1870
- NRHP reference No.: 70000850
- TSAL No.: 8200000465

Significant dates
- Added to NRHP: June 22, 1970
- Designated TSAL: January 1, 1981

Location
- Interactive map of Waco Suspension Bridge

The Waco Suspension Bridge crosses the Brazos River in Waco, Texas. The bridge once functioned as a key route for travelers following the Chisholm Trail, and when it debuted, no other single-span suspension bridge west of the Mississippi River exceeded its length. Efforts to construct a bridge over the Brazos River began in 1866, when the Texas State Legislature authorized the creation of a private firm, the Waco Bridge Company. The charter gave the company exclusive rights to cross the river for twenty-five years, prohibiting any other bridge within a five-mile radius. It was designed by the same company that would later build the Brooklyn Bridge. It is a single-span suspension bridge, with a main span of 475 ft (145 m). Opened on November 20, 1869, it contains nearly 3 million bricks. It is located north of downtown Waco, connecting Indian Spring Park (on the southwest side of the river) with Doris D. Miller Park (on the northeast side of the river). Every year on Independence Day, the bridge serves as a place where thousands of locals gather to watch fireworks. Indian Spring Park marks the location of the origin of the town of Waco, where the Huaco Indians had settled on the bank of the river, at the location of a cold spring.

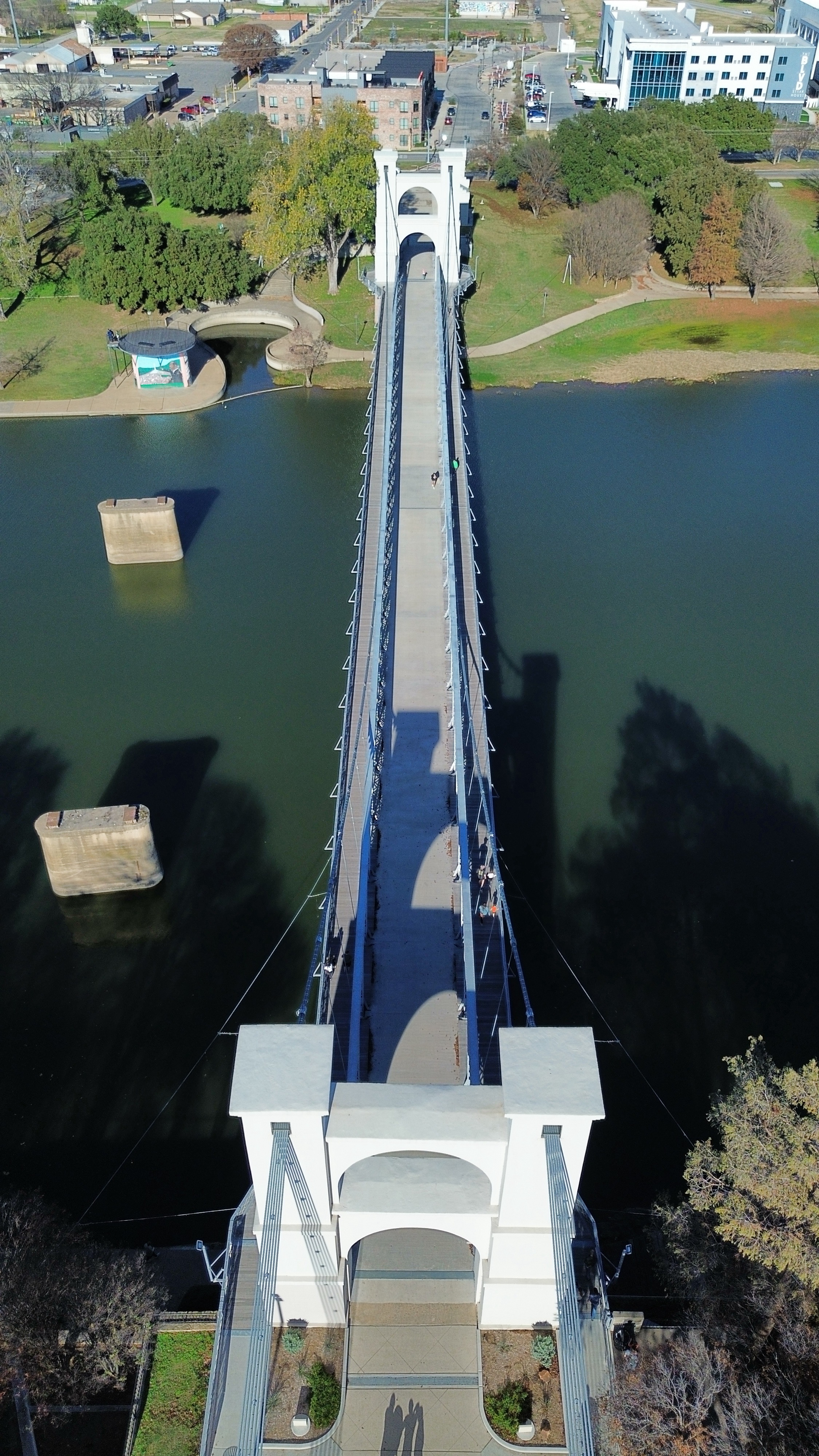
Waco Suspension Bridge in 2024

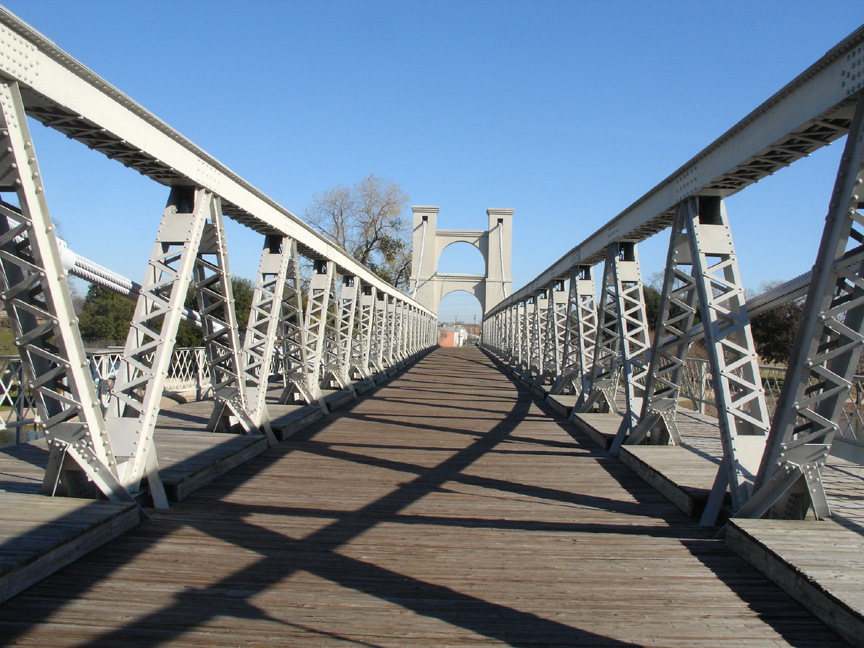
Deck of Waco Suspension Bridge in 2007

Before 1869, crossing the Brazos River was a time-consuming and sometimes dangerous ordeal. The only way to cross the river was by ferry, and due to the location of Waco on the growing Chisholm Trail, local businessmen knew that a bridge was needed to support commerce. For this reason, members of Waco Masonic Lodge #92 proposed the creation of such a bridge and they assigned a committee which would form the Waco Bridge Company, responsible for funding and building the project. A charter was received from the state in 1866.

Col. John T. Flint, an Austin lawyer and banker, who had moved to Waco after the war and established a firm named Flint & Chamberlain, went personally to New York to handle the contract for building a bridge.

The Waco Bridge Company, under the leadership of John T. Flint, enlisted New York civil engineer Thomas M. Griffith to manage the bridge project. In October 1868 Griffith began to supervise the construction using cables from the Roebling company of Trenton, New Jersey. The logistical and engineering difficulties he encountered were abnormal because of the remote location.

Due to lack of machine shops in the Waco area, getting the materials to the building site was a journey in itself. The nearest railroad was 100 miles (160 km) away, and the closest town with artisans with the skills needed was Galveston, over 212 miles (341 km) from the build site. Supplies were loaded onto a steamer in Galveston, and ferried to Bryan. From there, they were loaded onto wagons pulled by oxen. The pothole-filled dirt road over 80 miles long from Bryan to Waco was bad, even by 19th-century Texas standards.

The twin double towers that anchored the span were considered to be a marvel of engineering at the time, containing nearly 3 million bricks, which were produced locally.

The bridge collected its first toll on January 1, 1870. Its 475-foot (145 m) span made it the first major suspension bridge in Texas.

The bridge was wide enough for stagecoaches to pass each other, or for cattle to cross one side of the bridge, and humans to cross the other side. Being the only bridge to cross the Brazos at the time, and the primary river crossing for the north-south travel through Texas (including cattle drives on the Chisholm Trail), the cost of building the bridge, which was estimated to be $141,000, was quickly paid back. Tolls were 5 cents per head of cattle that crossed, along with a charge for pedestrian traffic.

Although initially unpopular, the toll led to plans for a free bridge in 1886 and a two-year legal battle, ending in 1888 when the U.S. Fifth District Court upheld the company’s charter. In 1889, McLennan County bought the bridge for $75,000 and transferred it to Waco for $1, making it toll-free. In 1913-1914, major reconstruction occurred on the bridge, replacing the older steel with higher gauge, and trusses were added to accommodate the span to carry heavier weights. This doubled as a new pedestrian walkway.

By 1971, the bridge had seen over 100 years of traffic. What started out as a cattle bridge had become a vehicular bridge, and the state historical committee decided that it was time to be retired, with larger and arguably safer bridges being built since the inception of the Waco Suspension Bridge. The bridge, by all accounts, helped to transform Waco from a small frontier town to a major commercial center. Today, the bridge is open to foot traffic only.

Beginning in October 2020, the bridge was closed as part of a $12.4 million rehabilitation project that involved replacing the suspension cables that had been installed in 1914, reinforcing the anchors, and replacing the decking. Temporary piers were placed in the river to support the deck while the cables were removed.

The bridge was listed on the National Register of Historic Places in 1970, and was designated as a Texas Historic Civil Engineering Landmark by the American Society of Civil Engineers in 1971.

== See also ==
- List of bridges documented by the Historic American Engineering Record in Texas
- List of bridges on the National Register of Historic Places in Texas
- National Register of Historic Places listings in McLennan County, Texas
