= KWBT (FM) =

- Waco, Texas; United States
- Broadcast area: Waco metropolitan area
- Frequency: 94.5 MHz (HD Radio)
- Branding: La Grande 94.5FM

Programming
- Language: Spanish
- Format: Regional Mexican

Ownership
- Owner: Jerry and Loy Lenamon; (Kennelwood Radio, LLC (Sale pending to Torres Media Group))
- Operator: Torres Media Group (Soccoro Torres)

History
- First air date: August 1, 1996
- Former call signs: KANF (1995); KBCT (1995–2014)
- Call sign meaning: Waco's Beat (former branding)

Technical information
- Licensing authority: FCC
- Facility ID: 33975
- Class: A
- ERP: 3,200 watts
- HAAT: 138 meters (453 ft)
- Transmitter coordinates: 31°30′31″N 97°10′3″W

Links
- Public license information: Public file; LMS
- Webcast: Listen live
- Website: www.945waco.com

KWBT (94.5 MHz, "La Grande 94.5FM") is a radio station in Waco, Texas, United States, broadcasting an Regional Mexican format. It is owned by Jerry and Loy Lenamon, through licensee Kennelwood Radio, LLC, and operated by Soccoro Torres' Torres Media Group through an LMA until the sale ends. KWBT's studios are located in Waco, and its transmitter is located off Beverley Drive near the Waco VA Hospital.

The station began broadcasting in August 1996 as jazz-formatted KBCT and spent stints as a country music and news/talk outlet. KWBT, an urban contemporary station which had broadcast at 104.9 MHz, moved to this frequency at the start of 2014. It flipped to urban adult contemporary in 2023. Later on February 1st, 2025, following the sale to Torres Media Group, it has flipped to Regional Mexican as "La Grande 94.5FM" under an LMA.

== History ==
The station was assigned the call sign KANF on August 11, 1995. On September 8, 1995, the station changed its call sign to KBCT. KBCT signed on August 1, 1996, as jazz station "The Spot". It was owned by Jerry and Loy Lenamon, who persevered through a ten-year hearing and permitting process at the Federal Communications Commission (FCC) to build the station. On March 3, 2003, The Spot was replaced with a country music format known as "Lone Star 94", putting it in competition with the market's leading country station, WACO-FM. Unable to make headway against WACO-FM in the ratings, KBCT flipped to conservative talk on January 8, 2007. It was the second station in the format locally but the only one on FM.

On December 31, 2013, the KWBT call letters and urban contemporary format on 104.9 in Bellmead, Texas, moved to 94.5, replacing KBCT's talk programming. The deal saw KWBT's program director, Edwards Media, take over the airtime of the 94.5 frequency under a local marketing agreement. The 104.9 facility became KBHT, which in turn launched its own competing rhythmic contemporary format.

The station had planned to launch their HD2 feed on translator station K231CG (94.1 FM) in early October 2018; the subchannel and translator were to carry CBS Sports Radio. however, the launch was delayed to the end of October due to "engineering and recent weather issues". On December 21, 2018, the Federal Communications Commission rescinded K231CG's broadcast license, as it had never properly been constructed before the expiration of its construction permit in 2016.

As of October 2023, KWBT flipped to urban AC as "Magic 94.5". The previous urban/hip-hop format that aired on KWBT is now on translator K297CC on 107.3, simulcasting KBHT HD4 as "The Beat 107.3".

As of January 23, 2025, KWBT has been sold to Torres Media Group for $400,000 and will flip to a Spanish format as "La Grande 94.5" as of February 1, 2025 under an LMA (Local Management Agreement) until the sale is finalized. On February 1, 2025, the station flipped to Regional Mexican as "La Grande 94.5FM". The format change gives Prophesy Media Group's KWOW a competitor to aim at hispanic listeners in the Waco Metropolitan Area.
