= KIXT =

Classic rock radio station serving the Waco metropolitan area

- Hewitt, Texas; United States
- Broadcast area: Waco metropolitan area
- Frequency: 106.7 MHz
- Branding: 106.7 The Eagle

Programming
- Format: Classic rock

Ownership
- Owner: Prophecy Media Group; (Prophecy Media Group, LLC)
- Sister stations: KWPW, KWOW

History
- First air date: June 29, 2010
- Former call signs: KDRW (2007–2012)
- Call sign meaning: "Kix" (former branding)

Technical information
- Licensing authority: FCC
- Facility ID: 170995
- Class: C3
- ERP: 10,000 watts
- HAAT: 150 meters (490 ft)
- Transmitter coordinates: 31°21′20″N 97°13′56″W

Links
- Public license information: Public file; LMS
- Webcast: Listen live
- Website: 1067theeagle.live

KIXT (106.7 FM, "The Eagle") is a radio station broadcasting a classic rock format. Licensed to Hewitt, Texas, United States, the station serves the Waco metropolitan area. The station is owned by Prophecy Media Group, LLC. Its studios are located in Waco, and its transmitter is located north of Bruceville-Eddy, Texas.

== History ==
The station signed on in 2010 as variety hits "Doc FM" KDRW (a nod to Waco being the birthplace of Dr Pepper). It switched to country music "Kix 106.7" KIXT in February 2012. The country format was relaunched as "106-7 The Bull" in 2014.

Another relaunch of the station happened on April 3, 2017 as a classic rock station called "The Eagle."
