= Neighborhoods of Waco, Texas =

Waco, a Texas city of around 120,000 has a number of neighborhoods. These are not official government neighborhoods, but rather common names given by the residents and city neighborhood maps and parks.

Waco is first divided into three "sides": the North Side, the South Side, and the East Side. Each side is then broken up into different sectors, or neighborhoods.

== North Side ==
The North Side of Waco is actually northwest when looking at a map.

- Austin Avenue (also called Castle Heights)
- Brook Oaks
- Brookview
- Cedar Ridge
- Dean Highland
- Heart O' Texas (also called Lake Air)
- Landon Branch
- Mountainview
- North Lake Waco
- North Waco
- Parkdale
- Richland Hills
- Sanger Heights
- Viking Hills

== South Side ==
The South Side (to the southeast geographically) is home to the heart of Waco. It is where the city was born and much of its history was created. It was a prosperous area until 1953, when it was devastated by a tornado. The South Side is a largely Hispanic community. It is home to many restaurants and stores.

There are six sectors in the South Side. They are:

- Alta Vista
- Baylor
- Brazos
- Kendrick
- Oakwood
- University

== East Side ==
The East Side, to the north and on the other side of the Brazos River, is a historically African-American side. There are three sectors in the East Side. They are:

- Carver Park
- East Riverside
- Timbercrest
- Cherry Park
- Frog Town
- Sherman Manors
- Sharondale
- Gholsen Heights
- Hollywood
- River Oaks
- Pecan Gardens
- Trendwood
- Estella Maxey

== Downtown ==
Downtown Waco is small compared to that of cities like Dallas or Houston. Nevertheless, 17,000 people commute to work there each day. Downtown Waco was built around the Waco Suspension Bridge, which was a crucial crossing of the Brazos River. In May 1953, a tornado struck downtown Waco killing 114, and injuring hundreds. It caused millions of dollars in damage, and negatively impacted Waco's economy for years to come. Downtown Waco is mainly known for the ALICO tower, which was completed in 1910, and was once the tallest structure in the Southwest. Downtown Waco is now the location of the famous Dr Pepper Museum, where Dr Pepper was invented, and the McLennan County Courthouse.

In the past few decades, Downtown Waco was slowly decaying as Waco grew to the West, away from Downtown. Recently Waco's city leaders have been working to make Downtown Waco the city center again. There are two projects currently being worked on in Heritage Square, which takes up two blocks in the downtown area. The first project is the new Chamber of Commerce of Waco, which will be an environmentally-friendly building. The second project, which is expected to break ground in the fall of 2007, is a mixed-use development with commercial and residential buildings.

== Other Sectors ==
There are other sectors in Waco that do not fit into one of the three sides. They are:

- Technology Village (North of Lacy Lakeview)
- China Spring (Northwest of Waco Regional Airport)
- Speegleville (West of Lake Waco)
- 84 Corridor (West of Woodway)
- West Waco / Hewitt (Between Woodway and Hewitt)

== Surrounding Cities ==
Though not a part of Waco, these cities depend on Waco's economy:

- Woodway (southwest of the North Side)
- Hewitt (south of the North Side)
- Robinson (south of the South Side)
- Bellmead, Elm Mott, Lacy-Lakeview, and Northcrest (Uptown) (north of the East Side)
- Beverly Hills (an island city west of I-35 near Floyd Casey Stadium, often considered a part of the South Side)
