= Johnny Swaim =

American basketball coach

Johnny Ray Swaim
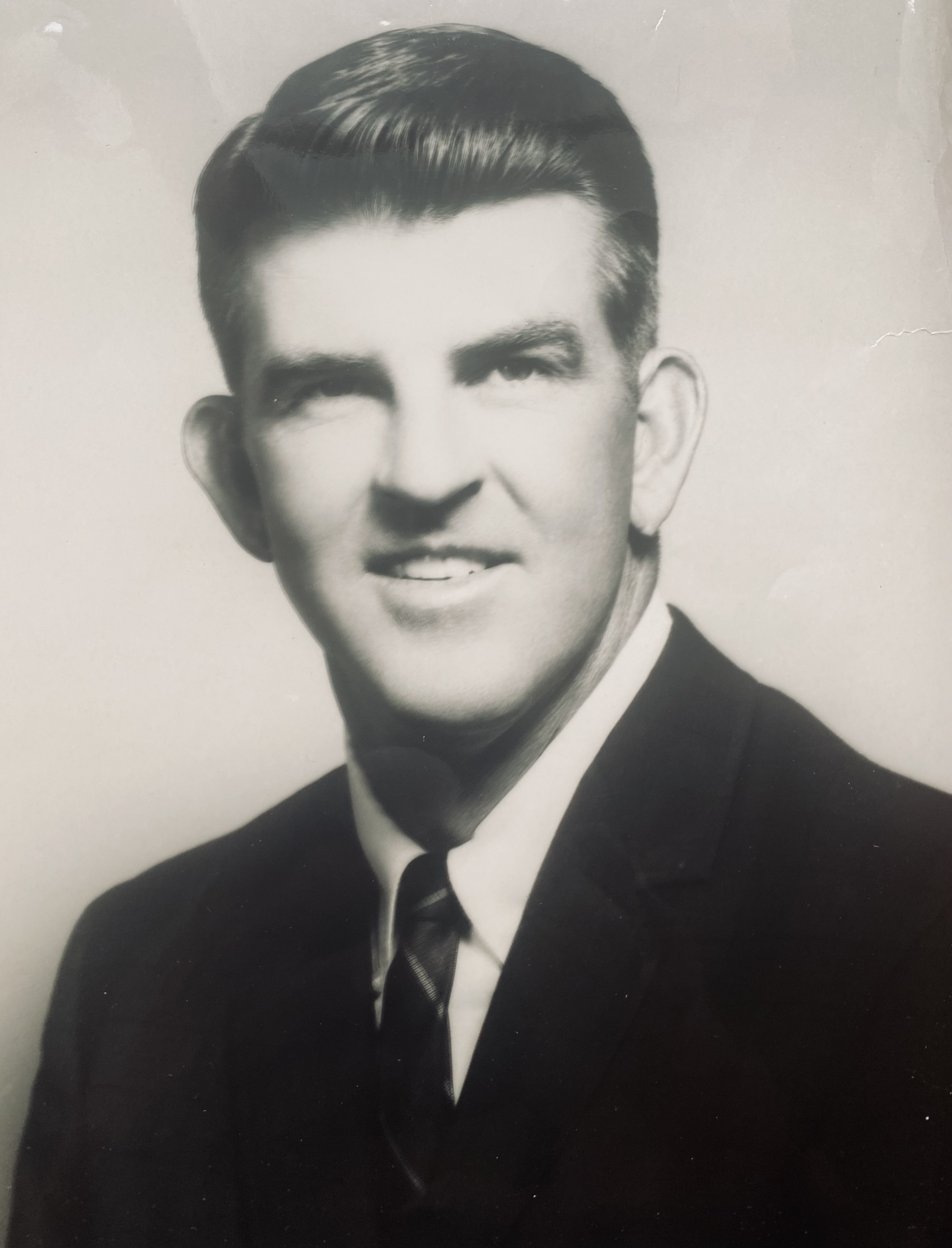
- Johnny Swaim, circa 1970

Biographical details
- Born: September 9, 1929; Jean, Texas, U.S.
- Died: October 5, 1995 (aged 66); Fort Worth, Texas, U.S.

Playing career
- 1950–1953: TCU
- Position: Guard

Coaching career (HC unless noted)
- 1955–1956: La Vega HS (TX)
- 1956–1967: TCU (assistant)
- 1967–1977: TCU

Head coaching record
- Overall: 102–151 (.403)
- Tournaments: 1–2 (NCAA)

Accomplishments and honors

Championships
- 2 SWC regular season (1968, 1971)

Awards
- 2x SWC Coach of the Year (1968, 1970)

Johnny Ray Swaim (September 9, 1929 – October 5, 1995) was an NCAA Division I head basketball coach from 1967 to 1977. He attended high school in Graham, Texas, where he lettered in four sports: basketball, baseball, football, and track. He was recruited by several Texas universities, but chose to attend Texas Christian University (TCU) in Fort Worth, Texas on a full four year basketball scholarship. While at TCU Swaim was a part of five Southwest Conference Championships as a player and coach and led his team to two NCAA Division I Men's Basketball tournaments. In 1968 and 1970 he was voted the Southwest Conference Coach of the Year. In 1975, he was named to TCU's 60-year All-time Basketball Team, and in 1983, he was inducted into the TCU Letterman's Hall of Fame.

== College years ==
The teams on which Swaim played as point guard for TCU coach Buster Brannon won the Southwest Conference championship in 1951, 1952, and 1953. He and teammate Richard Allen were the only players in TCU history to have played on three consecutive conference winners. Swaim was also a pitcher for the Horned Frog baseball team during those years. In his senior year, he was invited to play in the Second Ararat Shrine Temple East-West All Star Basketball Game in Kansas City, Missouri.

== Early coaching career ==
After graduation from TCU in 1953, Swaim entered the United States Marine Corps as a second lieutenant, having gone through the platoon leaders training program in college. He received an honorable discharge from the USMC in 1955, at which time he returned to Texas to coach basketball and baseball for one year at La Vega High School in Bellmead, near Waco, Texas. His college coaching career began the following year, 1956, when his former college coach, Buster Brannon, hired him as freshman basketball coach and recruiter. When the TCU freshman program was discontinued, Swaim was full-time varsity assistant until Brannon's retirement in 1967.

== Head coaching career ==
After Brannon retired Swaim was promoted to the head basketball coaching position at TCU. The team he inherited from Brannon was full of potential and he went to work to seriously draw it out. The 1967–68 TCU team was "picked" to finish no better than third in the Southwest Conference, with Texas Tech predicted to win the crown. Swaim became a student and advocate of the "zone press" as a defensive strategy, and he had the personnel to make it work: Mickey McCarty, a 6-5 extraordinary athlete who played the forward position; James Cash Jr., a 6-6 center who was the first black basketball player in the SWC; Tom Swift at the other forward position; Rick Wittenbraker and Bill Swanson at the starting guard spots; and a solid bench for support. With three games left, TCU was in fourth place behind co-leaders Baylor, Texas University, then Texas A&M, but by only one game. The Frogs then proceeded to beat Texas, then Texas A&M to place them in a three-way tie with Baylor and Texas.

An account by TCU Sports Information Director Jim Brock sums up the excitement of Swaim's rookie year and the showdown between TCU and Baylor which led to their 1968 SWC title.

"That Baylor game was something. With the Frogs tied with Baylor and Texas at the top rung going into the contest, the championship was on the line. TCU was behind 31-29 at halftime, but when Arkansas' 74-73 upset of Texas was announced with 5:39 left in the game, the Frogs were ahead 59-51, and the Purple supporters started the chant - all the way to the championship. Baylor made a surge, but the Frogs never looked better under pressure as they locked up the first title since 1959."

The Frogs then proceeded to the 1st round of the NCAA Midwest Regional defeating Kansas State before losing to No.1 ranked Houston and all-American Elvin Hayes in the Midwest championship game.

Coach Swaim would win one more Southwest Conference title in 1970-71, but lost to Notre Dame in the opening round of the NCAA Tournament.

== Head coaching record ==
Record table
Season	Team	Overall	Conference	Standing	Postseason
TCU Horned Frogs (Southwest Conference) (1967–1977)
1967–68	TCU	15–11	9–5	1st	NCAA University Division Regional Finals
1968–69	TCU	12–12	5–9	T–6th	
1969–70	TCU	10–14	8–6	T–3rd	
1970–71	TCU	15–12	11–3	1st	NCAA University Division First Round
1971–72	TCU	15–9	9–5	T–3rd	
1972–73	TCU	4–21	2–12	T–7th	
1973–74	TCU	8–17	2–12	8th	
1974–75	TCU	9–16	4–10	T–6th	
1975–76	TCU	11–16	6–10	7th	
1976–77	TCU	3–23	0–16	9th	
TCU:		102–151 (.403)	56–88 (.389)		
Total:		102–151 (.403)			
National champion Postseason invitational champion Conference regular season champion Conference regular season and conference tournament champion Division regular season champion Division regular season and conference tournament champion Conference tournament champion

== After coaching ==
In 1977 Johnny Swaim retired from coaching to enter the real estate business in Granbury, Texas.

At his death in 1995, he had been married for 42 years to the former Joan Hewatt. They are the parents of Michael Ray and Susan Elizabeth and the grandparents of Asher Kurtz.
