= U.S. Route 77 Business (Waco, Texas) =

Business route in McZLenna County, Texas, United States

Business U.S. Highway 77
- US 77 Bus. highlighted in red

Route information
- Maintained by TxDOT
- Length: 9.716 mi (15.636 km)
- Existed: June 21, 1990–present

Major junctions
- South end: US 77 in Waco
- Loop 484 in Waco; I-35 / US 77 in Waco; US 84 in Waco
- North end: I-35 / US 77 north of Lacy-Lakeview

Location
- Country: United States
- State: Texas
- Counties: McLennan

Highway system
- United States Numbered Highway System; List; Special; Divided; Highways in Texas; Interstate; US; State; Former; Toll; Loops; Spurs; FM/RM; Park; Rec

U.S. Route 77 Business (US 77 Business or US 77-L) is a business loop of U.S. Route 77 (US 77) in McLennan County, Texas, United States, that passes through Waco, Bellmead, and Lacy Lakeview

The highway is the old alignment of US 77 through the city and was formerly signed as a US 77 & US 81 Business Route, but designated as Loop 491 on October 2, 1970 until it was changed to the current Business US 77 designation on June 21, 1990. The section of highway from Loop 484 to US 84 is a freeway, making it the only business route in Texas that is a freeway.

== Route description ==
Northbound US 77-L begins as LaSalle Avenue in southern Waco at a traffic circle with its parent route, along with Circle Drive and Valley Mills Drive. Approximately 0.6 miles (0.97 km) north-northeast of the northbound southern terminus of US 77-L, it connects with southbound US 77 at South 18th Street. (This intersection is the southern terminus of southbound US 77-L.)

From that intersection US 77-L runs along the eastern boundary of Baylor University before crossing the Brazos River. Now, South Loop Drive, the highway interchanges with Loop 484 and becomes a mostly a freeway. After crossing Interstate 35 (I-35) / US 77 and then U.S. Route 84, the highway drops its freeway status and briefly enters Bellmead. The highway enters Lacy Lakeview as the town's main street. Just north of Lacy Lakeview US 77-L ends at I-35 / US 77 (just south of Elm Mott).

== Junction list ==
The entire highway is in McLennan County.

Location	mi	km	Destinations	Notes
Waco	0.0	0.0	US 77 north / LaSalle Avenue, Circle Drive, Valley Mills Drive – Cameron	Southern terminus (northbound US 77 Bus.); traffic circle
Waco	0.6	0.97	US 77 south (South 18th Street)	Southern terminus (southbound US 77 Bus.)
Waco	2.2	3.5	FM 434 (University Parks Drive) – Baylor University	
Waco	2.6	4.2	Bridge over the Brazos River	
Waco	2.7	4.3	Loop 574 (Martin Luther King Jr. Boulevard) – McLane Stadium	Interchange
Waco	3.1	5.0	Loop 484 east to SH 6 – Marlin, Bryan	Southern end of freeway
Waco	3.4	5.5	Orchard Lane	Southbound exit and northbound entrance
Waco	3.8	6.1	Frontage Road	Northbound exit and southbound entrance
Waco	4.2	6.8	I-35 / US 77 – Austin, Dallas, Fort Worth	
Waco	4.4	7.1	Cottenbelt Avenue	Southbound exit and northbound entrance
Waco	4.6	7.4	I-35 south / US 77 south – Austin	Southbound exit and northbound entrance
Waco	4.7	7.6	US 84 – Gatesville, Mexia	Northern end of freeway; no southbound entrance
Lacy Lakeview	6.5	10.5	Loop 340 south / FM 3051 (Industrial Boulevard) – Bellmead, Lake Waco	Split intersection
Lacy Lakeview	8.6	13.8	FM 2417 east (Crest Drive) – TSTC	
	9.7	15.6	I-35 / US 77 – Dallas, Fort Worth, Austin	Northern terminus
1.000 mi = 1.609 km; 1.000 km = 0.621 mi: Incomplete access

== See also ==
- List of U.S. Highways in Texas
