= George Washington Carver High School (Waco, Texas) =

Location
- 1601 J.J. Flewellen Road; Waco, Texas; U.S.
- Coordinates: 31.580°N 97.130°W

Information
- Type: Public
- Opened: 1956
- Closed: 1970
- Nickname: Panthers

George Washington Carver High School was a public secondary school in the La Vega Independent School District in Waco, Texas. It served as the high school for black students from 1956 until the public schools were integrated in 1970.

== History ==
From its founding in 1881, A.J. Moore was the only school for blacks in the Waco Metropolitan area. Carver was opened in 1956 on Dripping Springs Road as part of the La Vega Independent School District in 1956, although it would later become part of the Waco Independent School District. The initial enrollment was 500 in grades 1–12, but it quickly grew to 1,200 by 1962. In 1967 the band, under direction of Robert E. Lee won the grand prize at the Montreal World's Fair.

In 1970, after the school had already started football practice for the upcoming year, students heard that they would be attending La Vega High School in Bellmead. When school started, a walkout was organized because La Vega did not retain Carver coach Clarence Chase. The federal courts intervened with a plan that caused Waco Schools to take over East Waco, and moved a major industrial company, General Tire into the Waco school district's tax base.

J.J. Flewellen served as the only principal of Carver in its existence as a high school, and Dripping Springs Road was renamed J.J. Flewellen Road in his honor.

After closing, the site was heavily vandalized in the year in which it remained vacant. It was then used by community organizations YMCA and Meals on Wheels before being repurposed for special education in 1980. In 1984 the school was refurbished and turned into Carver Sixth Grade Center. In 1993 it became Carver Academy, which is the magnet school for STEM.

== Notable people ==
- Rodrigo Barnes, former NFL football linebacker, educator.
- Eddie Bell, former NFL football wide receiver
