= Connally High School =

Connally High School may refer to:

- John B. Connally High School - Austin, Texas
- Connally High School - Lacy Lakeview, Texas (Waco area)
