= Connally Independent School District =

Public schooling administrative division of Texas, U.S.

Location
- Waco, TX ESC Region 12 USA

District information
- Type: Public
- Grades: Pre-K through 12
- Established: 1950–51
- Superintendent: Josie Gutierrez

Students and staff
- Athletic conference: UIL Class AAAA
- Colors: Royal Blue and Grey

Other information
- Mascot: Cadet
- Website: Connally ISD

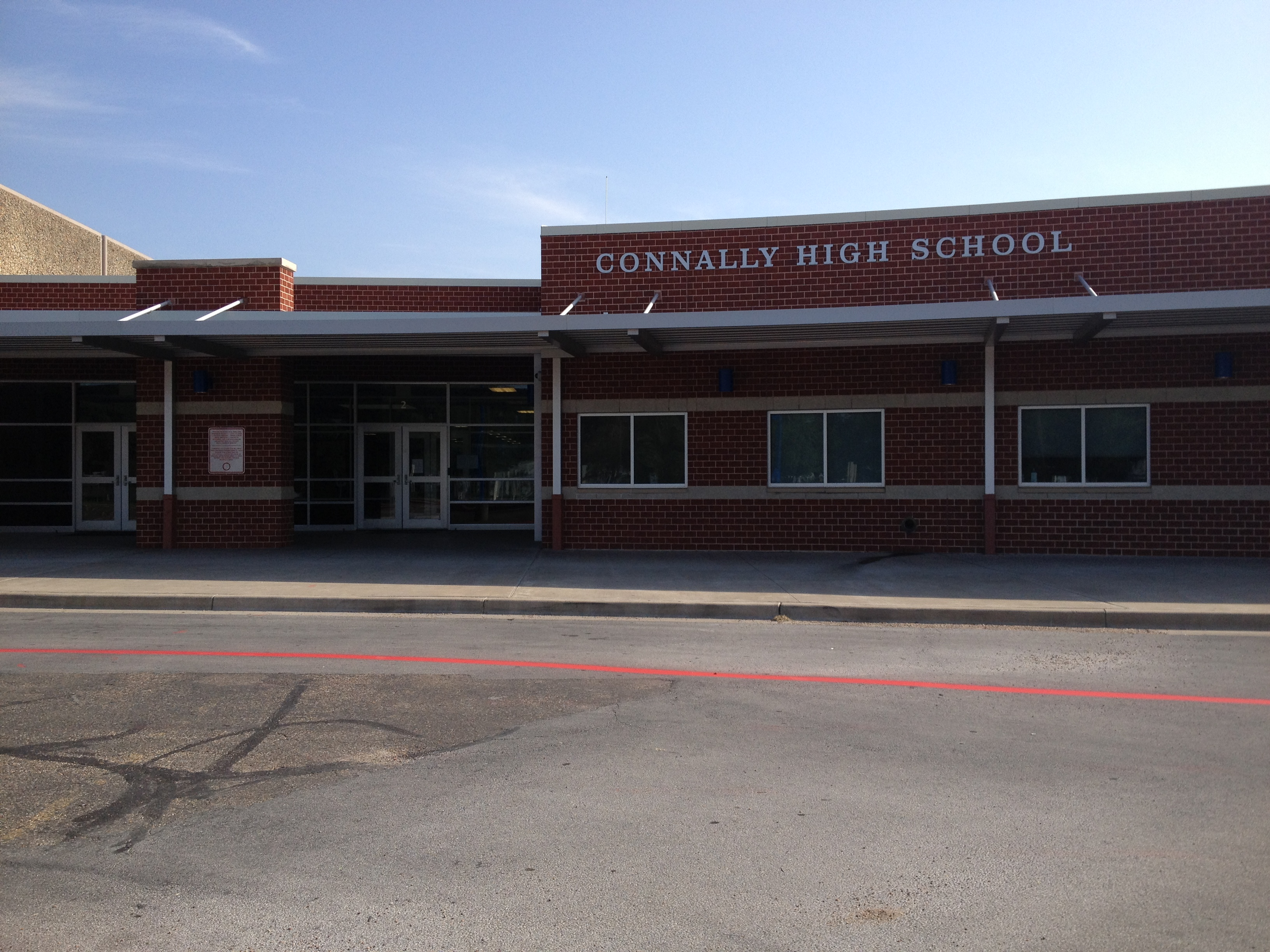
Connally High School

Connally Independent School District is a public school district with its headquarters in Lacy Lakeview, Texas (USA).

In addition to Connally ISD includes most of the city of Lacy-Lakeview, a small portion of north Waco, parts of Bellmead, and the communities of Elm Mott and Chalk Bluff.

== History ==
The district was formed in 1950–51 by the merger of the Lakeview and Elm Mott school districts. The name comes from the former James Connally Air Force Base in the district (now the flagship campus of the Texas State Technical College System) and carries over to the school mascot, the Cadet.

After the resumption of classes in fall 2021 during the COVID-19 pandemic, two teachers at the junior high school died of COVID-19 by September 1, 2021; the district canceled classes for two days and reopened after Labor Day with a mask mandate, one of several smaller school districts to join urban districts in requiring masks.

== Schools ==
- Connally High School (Grades 9-12)
- Connally Junior High School (Grades 6-8)
- Connally Elementary School (PreK-5th grade)

Effective 2026, it will have only one elementary school campus, at the Connally Primary School location.

Former schools:

- Elm Mott Elementary School
- Northcrest Elementary School
