= List of state highway loops in Texas (400–499) =

- Texas State Highway Loop marker

Highway names
- Interstates: Interstate Highway X (IH-X, I-X)
- US Highways: U.S. Highway X (US X)
- State: State Highway X (SH X)
- Loops: Loop X
- Spurs: Spur X
- Farm or Ranch to Market Roads: Farm to Market Road X (FM X); Ranch-to-Market Road X (RM X)
- Park Roads: Park Road X (PR X)

System links
- Highways in Texas; Interstate; US; State; Former; Toll; Loops; Spurs; FM/RM; Park; Rec

State highway loops in Texas are owned and maintained by the Texas Department of Transportation (TxDOT).

== Loop 401 ==
State Highway Loop 401
- Location: Scurry County
- Existed: August 31, 1964–June 21, 1990

Loop 401 was located in Scurry County. It was designated on August 31, 1964, when US 84 was bypassed around Snyder. The route was signed as a business route of US 84. On June 21, 1990, Loop 401 was cancelled and redesignated Bus. US 84.

== Loop 402 ==
State Highway Loop 402
- Location: Howard County
- Existed: December 18, 1964–June 21, 1990

Loop 402 was designated on December 18, 1964, along the old routing of US 80 through Big Spring. The route was signed as US 80 Business rather than Loop 402. On June 21, 1990, Loop 402 was cancelled and redesignated as Business I-20-G.

== Loop 403 ==
State Highway Loop 403
- Location: Parmer County
- Length: 1.021 mi (1.643 km)
- Existed: January 26, 1965–present

Loop 403 is located in Parmer County. It runs from US 84 northwest of Lariat to US 84 southeast of Lariat.

Loop 403 was designated on January 26, 1965, on the current route along an old routing of US 84.

== Loop 404 ==
State Highway Loop 404
- Location: Wilbarger County
- Length: 1.081 mi (1.740 km)
- Existed: January 26, 1965–present

Loop 404 is located in Wilbarger County. It runs from US 287, 0.5 miles (0.80 km) west of Oklaunion, to another point on US 287 southeast of Oklaunion.

Loop 404 was designated on January 26, 1965, on its current route. It is a former alignment of US 287.

Junction list

The entire route is in Wilbarger County.

| Location | mi | km | Destinations | Notes |
|---|---|---|---|---|
| | 0.0 | 0.0 | US 70 / US 183 / US 287 | Interchange |
| Oklaunion | 0.5 | 0.80 | Loop 145 north to US 287 – Vernon | West end of Loop 145 overlap |
| Oklaunion | 0.6 | 0.97 | Loop 145 east to US 70 / US 183 / US 287 north | East end of Loop 145 overlap |
| | 1.1 | 1.8 | US 287 south | |
1.000 mi = 1.609 km; 1.000 km = 0.621 mi: Concurrency terminus

== Loop 405 ==
=== Loop 405 (1965) ===
State Highway Loop 405
- Location: McLennan County
- Existed: January 26, 1965–November 12, 1965

The first use of the Loop 405 designation was in McLennan County, from US 84, west along Valley Mills Drive (former SH 6) and Bosque Boulevard to SH 6. Loop 405 was cancelled on November 12, 1965, and replaced by Spur 396 (now Loop 396).

=== Loop 405 (1967) ===
State Highway Loop 405
- Location: Walker County
- Existed: August 31, 1967–May 21, 1979

The next use of the Loop 405 designation was in Walker County, from SH 19 northeast of Huntsville southward to I-45. Loop 405 was cancelled on May 21, 1979, and became a portion of SH 19.

== Loop 406 ==
State Highway Loop 406
- Location: Val Verde County
- Existed: April 1, 1965–October 27, 1967

Loop 406 was designated on April 1, 1965, from then-new US 90 north along old US 90 across Devils River to US 90. On October 27, 1967, the section from 0.7 miles (1.1 km) northwest of US 90 to a point 9.4 miles (15.1 km) northwest was removed altogether, the section from the southeast junction with US 90 to a point 0.7 miles (1.1 km) northwest was transferred to Spur 454 and the remainder was changed to Spur 406.

== Loop 409 ==
State Highway Loop 409
- Location: Brazoria County
- Existed: April 1, 1965–June 21, 1990

Loop 409 was designated on April 1, 1965, along the old route of SH 35 through Alvin. The route was signed as SH 35 Business rather than Loop 409. On June 21, 1990, Loop 409 was cancelled and redesignated as Bus. SH 35.

== Loop 410 ==
Loop 410 is a designation that has been used twice. No highway currently uses the Loop 410 designation.

=== Loop 410 (1960) ===
State Highway Loop 410
- Location: Bexar County
- Existed: October 5, 1960–July 31, 1969

The first use of the Loop 410 designation was in Bexar County, from I-10 in northern San Antonio east to I-35 near Fratt, as a renumbering of a section of Loop 13. Loop 410 was cancelled on July 31, 1969, and transferred to I-410.

=== Loop 410 (1971) ===
State Highway Loop 410
- Location: Harris County
- Existed: December 7, 1971–June 21, 1990

The next use of the Loop 410 designation was in Harris County as a business loop of SH 146 through La Porte. The route was signed as SH 146 Business rather than Loop 410. On July 28, 1977, the section along Avenue J from SH 146 to Broadway was cancelled and Loop 410 was rerouted on a new route to SH 146, replacing a portion of Spur 501 and all of Spur 498. This was also signed as SH 146 Business. Loop 410 was cancelled on June 21, 1990, and transferred to Bus. SH 146.

== Loop 411 ==
State Highway Loop 411
- Location: Wilson County
- Existed: May 31, 1965–June 21, 1990

Loop 411 was the designation of the former route of US 87 through Stockdale. It is now Bus. US 87.

== Loop 415 ==
State Highway Loop 415
- Location: Cameron County
- Existed: September 1, 1965–June 21, 1990

Loop 415 was designated on September 1, 1965, from US 77/US 83 in Brownsville along an old routing of US 77/US 83 to the Gateway Bridge at Elizabeth and 14th Streets. The route was signed as US 77/US 83 Business rather than Loop 415. On June 21, 1990, Loop 415 was cancelled and transferred to Bus. US 77.

== Loop 416 ==
State Highway Loop 416
- Location: Hudspeth County
- Existed: October 15, 1965–June 21, 1990

Loop 416 was located in Hudspeth County. It was the former alignment of US 80 through Sierra Blanca. It is now Business I-10.

== Loop 418 ==
State Highway Loop 418
- Location: Williamson County
- Existed: October 15, 1965–June 21, 1990

Loop 418 was located in Georgetown. It was redesignated Business I-35, portions of which are now Spur 26 and Spur 158.

== Loop 419 ==
=== Loop 419 (1965) ===
State Highway Loop 419
- Location: Titus County
- Existed: November 16, 1965–June 21, 1990

The first use of the Loop 419 designation was in Titus County as a loop off US 271 in Mount Pleasant. The route was signed as US 271 Business rather than Loop 419. On June 21, 1990, Loop 419 was cancelled and transferred to Bus. US 271.

=== Loop 419 (2007) ===
State Highway Loop 419
- Location: Brazoria County
- Existed: March 29, 2007–May 30, 2013

The next use of the Loop 419 designation was in Brazoria County as a loop off FM 524 along the old route of SH 35 through Old Ocean. On May 30, 2013, the section from FM 524 to CR 374 was returned to Brazoria County (became CR 374) and the remainder was changed to Spur 419.

== Loop 420 ==
State Highway Loop 420
- Location: Webb County
- Existed: November 5, 1965–June 21, 1990

Loop 420 was located in Laredo. It was redesignated Bus. US 83, which is now Business I-35.

== Loop 424 ==
State Highway Loop 424
- Location: San Jacinto County
- Length: 3.023 mi (4.865 km)
- Existed: January 19, 1966–present

Loop 424 is located in San Jacinto County. The highway was designated in 1966 along the old route of US 59 through Shepherd.

Junction list

The entire route is in Shepherd, San Jacinto County.

| mi | km | Destinations | Notes |
|---|---|---|---|
| 0.0 | 0.0 | US 59 / FM 3460 south | US 59 exit 453; future I-69 |
| 1.7 | 2.7 | SH 150 – Coldspring | |
| 3.0 | 4.8 | US 59 | future I-69 |
1.000 mi = 1.609 km; 1.000 km = 0.621 mi

== Loop 425 ==
State Highway Loop 425
- Location: Callahan County
- Existed: January 19, 1966–June 21, 1990

Loop 425 was designated on January 19, 1966, as a loop off I-20 in Baird along an old routing of US 80. On June 21, 1990, Loop 425 was cancelled and transferred to Business I-20-T.

== Loop 426 ==
State Highway Loop 426
- Location: Hood County
- Existed: January 19, 1966–June 21, 1990

Loop 426 was designated on January 19, 1966, as a loop off US 377 in Granbury along an old routing of US 377. On June 21, 1990, Loop 426 was cancelled and transferred to Bus. US 377.

== Loop 427 ==
State Highway Loop 427
- Location: Williamson County
- Existed: January 20, 1966–June 21, 1990

Loop 427 was a business route of US 79 in Taylor. It is now designated as Bus. US 79.

== Loop 428 ==
State Highway Loop 428
- Location: Nueces and Kleberg counties
- Existed: January 19, 1966–June 21, 1990

Loop 428 was designated on January 19, 1966, as a loop off US 77 through Bishop and Kingsville along an old routing of US 77. On June 21, 1990, Loop 428 was cancelled and transferred to Bus. US 77.

== Loop 429 ==
State Highway Loop 429
- Location: Grimes County
- Length: 0.259 mi (417 m)
- Existed: January 20, 1966–present

Loop 429 is located in Grimes County, within the county seat of Anderson. Its southern terminus is at FM 1774. It runs north along Main Street, intersecting Buffington Lane in a traffic circle around the county courthouse, before continuing to its northern terminus at FM 149.

Loop 429 was designated on January 20, 1966, along the current route.

== Loop 430 ==
State Highway Loop 430
- Location: Lamb County
- Length: 4.807 mi (Note: The certified length given is shorter than the actual mileage, as the Texas Department of Transportation description of Loop 430 considers it to be discontinuous at rather than concurrent with US 385.) (7.736 km)
- Existed: May 5, 1966–present

Loop 430 is located in Lamb County. The highway was designated in 1966 along the old route of US 84 through Littlefield.

Junction list

The entire route is in Littlefield, Lamb County.

| mi | km | Destinations | Notes |
|---|---|---|---|
| 0.0 | 0.0 | US 84 | |
| 2.5 | 4.0 | US 385 north – Dimmitt | West end of US 385 overlap |
| 2.7 | 4.3 | US 385 south – Levelland | East end of US 385 overlap; access to Lamb Healthcare Center |
| 3.3 | 5.3 | FM 54 | |
| 4.9 | 7.9 | US 84 | |
1.000 mi = 1.609 km; 1.000 km = 0.621 mi: Concurrency terminus

== Loop 431 ==
State Highway Loop 431
- Location: Maverick County
- Existed: May 5, 1966–June 21, 1990

Loop 431 was designated on May 5, 1966, as a loop off US 277 in Eagle Pass. On December 21, 1983, Loop 431 was rerouted over old US 277 along Spur 240 to US 57. Loop 431 was cancelled on June 21, 1990, and transferred to Bus. US 277.

== Loop 432 ==
State Highway Loop 432
- Location: Nolan County
- Existed: August 4, 1966–June 21, 1990

Loop 432 was designated on August 4, 1966, as a loop off I-20 in Sweetwater along an old routing of US 80. The route was signed as US 80 Business rather than Loop 432. On June 21, 1990, Loop 432 was cancelled and transferred to Business I-20-M.

== Loop 434 ==
State Highway Loop 434
- Location: Potter County
- Length: 4.999 mi (8.045 km)
- Existed: August 31, 1966–present

Loop 434 is located in Amarillo. It is the former route of US 87 through the northern part of the city.

== Loop 436 ==
State Highway Loop 436
- Location: Panola County
- Existed: August 31, 1966–September 25, 1989

Loop 436 was designated on August 31, 1966, as a loop off US 59 around the west side of Carthage. On October 21, 1981, the section from US 59 south to US 79/Loop 334 was transferred to US 79. The remainder of Loop 436 was cancelled on September 25, 1989, and removed from the highway system. The route is now portions of US 79 and SH 149.

== Loop 438 ==
State Highway Loop 438
- Location: Runnels County
- Length: 3.765 mi (6.059 km)
- Existed: October 3, 1966–present

Loop 438 is located in Winters.

Loop 438 was designated on October 3, 1966, as a loop off FM 53 along an old routing of FM 53.

== Loop 439 ==
State Highway Loop 439
- Location: Collin County
- Existed: October 3, 1966–June 21, 1990

Loop 439 was designated on October 3, 1966, as a loop off SH 289 in Prosper along an old routing of SH 289. The route was signed as SH 289 Business rather than Loop 438. On June 21, 1990, Loop 438 was cancelled and transferred to Bus. SH 289.

== Loop 441 ==
State Highway Loop 441
- Location: Grayson County
- Existed: October 3, 1966–June 21, 1990

Loop 441 was located in Grayson County. It was designated on October 3, 1966, as a loop off SH 99 (now US 377) in Whitesboro. The route was signed as a business route of SH 99. On June 21, 1990, Loop 441 was cancelled and transferred to Bus. US 377.

== Loop 442 ==
State Highway Loop 442
- Location: Limestone County
- Length: 1.350 mi (2.173 km)
- Existed: October 3, 1966–present

Loop 442 is located in Tehuacana.

Loop 442 was designated on October 3, 1966, as a loop off SH 171 along an old routing of SH 171. The route was signed as SH 171 Business rather than Loop 442.

== Loop 443 ==
State Highway Loop 443
- Location: Nueces County
- Existed: October 3, 1966–June 21, 1990

Loop 443 was designated on October 3, 1966, from SH 358 east to US 181 in downtown Corpus Christi along an old routing of SH 44. On June 21, 1990, Loop 443 was cancelled and transferred to Bus. SH 44 (now Spur 544).

== Loop 444 ==
State Highway Loop 444
- Location: Wise County
- Length: 0.854 mi (1,374 m)
- Existed: October 3, 1966–present

Loop 444 is located in Paradise. Both of its termini are at SH 114.

Loop 444 was designated on October 3, 1966. It is a former alignment of SH 114 in Paradise.

== Loop 445 ==
State Highway Loop 445
- Location: Hale County
- Existed: January 31, 1967–June 21, 1990

Loop 445 was a loop off US 87 in Plainview. It is now Business I-27.

== Loop 446 ==
State Highway Loop 446
- Location: Collin County
- Existed: April 27, 1967–June 21, 1990

Loop 446 was designated on April 27, 1967, as a loop off SH 78 in Farmersville along an old routing of SH 78. The route was signed as SH 78 Business rather than Loop 446. On June 21, 1990, Loop 446 was cancelled and transferred to Bus. SH 78.

== Loop 448 ==
State Highway Loop 448
- Location: Cameron and Willacy counties
- Existed: June 1, 1967–June 21, 1990

Loop 448 was designated on June 1, 1967, from US 77 north of Harlingen southeast to US 77/US 83 southeast of San Benito. The route was signed as US 77 Business rather than Loop 448. On July 31, 1969, a section of old US 77 from US 77 north of Raymondville to Spur 56 south of Raymondville was added, creating a gap. This section was also signed as US 77 Business. On September 30, 1974, a section from Spur 56 south to US 77 south of Sebestian was added, shortening the gap. Like the rest of the route, this section was signed as Bus. US 77. On June 21, 1990, Loop 448 was cancelled: the Raymondville-Sebestian section was transferred to Bus. US 77 and the Harlingen-San Benito section was transferred to Bus. US 77.

== Loop 451 ==
State Highway Loop 451
- Location: Fannin County
- Existed: September 26, 1967–June 21, 1990

Loop 451 was designated on September 26, 1967, as a loop off SH 121 in Randolph along an old routing of SH 121. The route was signed as SH 121 Business rather than Loop 451. On June 21, 1990, Loop 451 was cancelled and transferred to Bus. SH 121.

== Loop 452 ==
State Highway Loop 452
- Location: Coryell County
- Existed: April 8, 1986–June 21, 1990

Loop 452 was designated on April 8, 1986, in Gatesville, from SH 36 south 3.4 miles (5.5 km) to US 84 and from US 84 southeast 1.1 miles (1.8 km) to SH 36, creating a concurrency with US 84. The route was formerly a section of SH 36. On June 21, 1990, Loop 452 was cancelled and transferred to Bus. SH 36.

== Loop 453 ==
State Highway Loop 453
- Location: Comal County
- Existed: October 27, 1967–June 21, 1990

Loop 453 was designated on October 27, 1967, as a loop off Loop 337 in New Braunfels along an old routing of SH 46. The route was signed as SH 46 Business rather than Loop 453. On June 21, 1990, Loop 453 was cancelled and transferred to Bus. SH 46.

== Loop 455 ==
State Highway Loop 455
- Location: Panola County
- Existed: December 15, 1967–June 21, 1990

Loop 455 was designated on December 15, 1967, as a loop off US 59 in Carthage along an old routing of US 59. The route was signed as US 59 Business rather than Loop 455. On December 15, 1981, the route was modified to run continuous along city streets. Loop 455 was cancelled on June 21, 1990, and transferred to Bus. US 59.

== Loop 456 ==
State Highway Loop 456
- Location: Cherokee County
- Length: 3.163 mi (5.090 km)
- Existed: December 16, 1967–present

Loop 456 is located in Cherokee County. Its western terminus is at an intersection with FM 347 (South Bolton Street) south of downtown Jacksonville. The two-lane road goes eastward, then curves toward the northeast while passing the Jacksonville Independent School District's Nichols Intermediate School. Loop 456 has a signalized intersection with US 69 (South Jackson Street) and then intersects FM 768 (Corinth Road). The road continues northeastward to its eastern terminus at a T intersection with SH 204. Here, eastbound SH 204 traffic turns to the east, while westbound SH 204 continues ahead.

Loop 456 was designated on December 16, 1967. A later plan to extend the route from US 79 east of downtown Jacksonville to the north side of the city at US 69 was not implemented or built. In recent years, the Loop 456 intersection at US 69 south was upgraded to a full signalized intersection.

== Loop 457 ==
State Highway Loop 457
- Location: Delta County
- Existed: January 16, 1968–June 21, 1990

Loop 457 was designated on January 16, 1968, as a loop off SH 24 in Cooper along an old routing of SH 24. The route was signed as SH 24 Business rather than Loop 457. On June 21, 1990, Loop 457 was cancelled and transferred to Bus. SH 24.

== Loop 461 ==
State Highway Loop 461
- Location: Lubbock County
- Length: 1.719 mi (2.766 km)
- Existed: February 29, 1968–present

Loop 461 is located in New Deal. It is the former alignment of US 87 through the city.

== Loop 462 ==
State Highway Loop 462
- Location: Hunt County
- Existed: February 29, 1968–June 21, 1990

Loop 462 was designated on February 29, 1968, as a loop off SH 24 in Floyd along an old routing of SH 24. The route was signed as SH 24 Business rather than Loop 462. On June 21, 1990, Loop 462 was cancelled and transferred to Bus. US 380.

== Loop 463 ==
State Highway Loop 463
- Location: Victoria County
- Length: 5.749 mi (9.252 km)
- Existed: May 23, 1968–present

Texas State Highway Loop 463 (Loop 463) is a state highway loop in the city of Victoria in the U.S. state of Texas.

== Loop 464 ==
State Highway Loop 464
- Location: Ward County
- Length: 5.914 mi (9.518 km)
- Existed: April 29, 1968–present

Loop 464 is located in Ward County. It begins at SH 18 south of Monahans. The route travels along Loop Road to the north and enters the city as it crosses over I-20; access from the freeway is provided by exit 79. The highway passes between Thorntonville to the west and Roy Hurd Memorial Airport to the east before crossing Business I-20, the former route of US 80 through the city. Loop 464 turns to the northwest and leaves the city limits before resuming a more northerly trajectory and ending at another junction with SH 18.

Loop 464 was designated on April 29, 1968, along the current route. As of November 2012, TxDOT is considering the addition of a ramp along eastbound I-20 at the exit for Loop 464.

== Loop 466 ==
State Highway Loop 466
- Location: Crockett County
- Length: 3.152 mi (5.073 km)
- Existed: June 12, 1968–present

Loop 466 is located in Crockett County.

Loop 466 was designated on June 12, 1968.

== Loop 467 ==
State Highway Loop 467
- Location: Sutton County
- Length: 4.917 mi (7.913 km)
- Existed: June 12, 1968–present

Loop 467 is located in Sutton County. Its western terminus is at I-10 exit 399. It runs to the southeast and into Sonora, where it intersects and is briefly concurrent with US 277. After the two routes separate, Loop 467 intersects RM 1691 before turning back to the northeast and leaving Sonora. The route's eastern terminus is at I-10 exit 404, which also provides access to RM 864 and RM 3130.

Loop 467 was designated on June 12, 1968. It is a routing of the former US 290 through Sonora and was originally signed as a business route of US 290.

== Loop 472 ==
State Highway Loop 472
- Location: Lynn County
- Length: 1.859 mi (2.992 km)
- Existed: January 31, 1969–present

Loop 472 is located in Lynn County. It is the former route of US 87 through Tahoka.

== Loop 473 ==
State Highway Loop 473
- Location: Wichita County
- Length: 4.367 mi (7.028 km)
- Existed: January 31, 1969–present

State Highway Loop 473 (Loop 473) is a loop located in Wichita Falls.

== Loop 475 ==
State Highway Loop 475
- Location: Grayson County
- Existed: March 7, 1969–June 21, 1990

Loop 475 was designated on March 7, 1969, as a loop off US 377 in Tioga along an old routing of US 377. The route was signed as US 377 Business rather than Loop 475. On June 21, 1990, Loop 475 was cancelled and transferred to Bus. US 377.

== Loop 476 ==
State Highway Loop 476
- Location: Grayson County
- Existed: March 7, 1969–June 21, 1990

Loop 476 was designated on March 7, 1969, as a loop off US 377 in Collinsville along an old routing of US 377. The route was signed as US 377 Business rather than Loop 476. On June 21, 1990, Loop 476 was cancelled and transferred to Bus. US 377.

== Loop 477 ==
State Highway Loop 477
- Location: Wilbarger and Wichita counties
- Existed: March 7, 1969–June 21, 1990

Loop 477 was designated on March 7, 1969, from US 287 at the Wichita–Wilbarger county line southeast via Electra to US 287 southeast of Electra. The route was signed as US 287 Business rather than Loop 477. On June 21, 1990, was cancelled and transferred to Bus. US 287.

== Loop 478 ==
State Highway Loop 478
- Location: El Paso County
- Length: 5.909 mi (9.510 km)
- Existed: April 2, 1969–present

Loop 478 is located in El Paso. Its southern terminus of Loop 478 is at US 62 (East Paisano Drive) in El Paso near the Bridge of the Americas. The route travels north along Copia Street, intersecting SH 20 (Alameda Drive) and crossing under the I-10 freeway at its exit 22A. It then turns northwest onto Pershing Drive and then north on Dyer Street, paralleling US 54 (Patriot Freeway) to its east. At its northern terminus, it curves northward to end at US 54 and Bus. US 54.

Loop 478 was established on April 2, 1969, from US 54 near the New Mexico state line to the Mexican border along the Rio Grande. The section along old US 54 was marked as Bus. US 54. On June 21, 1990, the section of Loop 478 east of US 54 was transferred to Bus. US 54.

== Loop 480 ==
State Highway Loop 480
- Location: Maverick County
- Length: 16.730 mi (26.924 km)
- Existed: May 29, 2003–present

Loop 480 forms a partial loop around Eagle Pass. Beginning near the Eagle Pass Camino Real Port of Entry, it runs counterclockwise, crossing FM 1021 and US 277, before ending at US 57 northwest of the city.

Loop 480 was designated on May 29, 2003. The Loop 480 designation extends past the current northern terminus to another intersection with US 277 north of Eagle Pass; however, as of 2022, this segment has not been constructed.

In 2019, Loop 480 was designated Loop JUNO in honor of educator Julissa Nevarez and pharmacist Noe Tinajero, both of whom lived in Eagle Pass and died in 2017.

The entire route is in Maverick County.

| Location | mi | km | Destinations | Notes |
|---|---|---|---|---|
| Eagle Pass | 0.0 | 0.0 | Industrial Boulevard | State maintenance ends; roadway continues north as Industrial Boulevard |
| | 4.8 | 7.7 | FM 1021 | Interchange |
| | 7.6 | 12.2 | US 277 | Interchange |
| Eagle Pass | 10.7 | 17.2 | US 57 | Northbound exit and southbound entrance |
| Eagle Pass | | | FM 1588 | proposed |
| Eagle Pass | 16.73 | 26.92 | US 277 | Future northern terminus |
1.000 mi = 1.609 km; 1.000 km = 0.621 mi

=== Loop 480 (1969) ===
State Highway Loop 480
- Location: Lamar County
- Existed: May 28, 1969–June 21, 1990

A previous route numbered Loop 480 was designated in Lamar County on May 28, 1969, from US 82 in northern Paris south and southeast 4.9 miles (7.9 km) to US 271. It was signed as a business route of US 271. On June 21, 1990, Loop 480 was cancelled and transferred to Bus. US 271.

== Loop 481 ==
State Highway Loop 481
- Location: Kimble County
- Length: 3.551 mi (5.715 km)
- Existed: July 1, 1969–present

Loop 481 is located in Kimble County. The highway was designated in 1969 over the old route of US 83 / US 290 when those highways were rerouted around the town of Junction with the construction of I-10.

The highway begins at an intersection with US 377 (11th Street). The highway travels in an eastern direction along Main Street and passes through the Junction town square. Loop 481 turns in a southeast direction at East Main Street and crosses the South Llano River before leaving the town. The highway has a short overlap with FM 2169 near the Texas Tech University Junction Center. The highway travels through rural areas and hilly terrain before ending at an interchange with I-10 / US 83.

Along with US 377 (North Main Street), Loop 481 forms a business loop of I-10 through Junction.

Junction list

The entire route is in Kimble County.

| Location | mi | km | Destinations | Notes |
|---|---|---|---|---|
| Junction | 0.0 | 0.0 | US 377 to I-10 | |
| Junction | 0.6 | 0.97 | Bridge over South Llano River | |
| | 0.9 | 1.4 | FM 2169 east to I-10 west | West end of FM 2169 overlap |
| | 1.1 | 1.8 | FM 2169 west – Texas Tech University at Junction | East end of FM 2169 overlap |
| | 3.5 | 5.6 | I-10 east / US 83 south – San Antonio, Uvalde | Interchange; eastbound exit and westbound entrance; I-10 exit 460 |
1.000 mi = 1.609 km; 1.000 km = 0.621 mi: Concurrency terminus; Incomplete access

== Loop 483 ==
State Highway Loop 483
- Location: Collin County
- Existed: November 26, 1969–June 21, 1990

Loop 483 was designated on November 26, 1989, as a loop off SH 289 in Celina along an old routing of SH 289. On June 21, 1990, Loop 483 was cancelled and transferred to Bus. SH 289.

== Loop 484 ==
State Highway Loop 484
- Location: McLennan County
- Length: 2.539 mi (4.086 km)
- Existed: September 25, 1984–present

Loop 484 is located in eastern Waco. The 2.5-mile-long (4.0 km) highway serves as a connector between Bus. US 77 and SH 6. It is mostly unsigned, with the westbound route usually signed as "to Bus. US 77" and the eastbound route labeled as "to SH 6".

Loop 484 was designated on September 25, 1984, along the current route. It is a former alignment of SH 6.

Exit list

The entire route is in Waco, McLennan County.

| mi | km | Destinations | Notes |
|---|---|---|---|
| 0.0 | 0.0 | SH 6 / Loop 340 – Marlin, Bryan, Meridian | Southern terminus; roadway continues south as SH 6 |
| 1.4 | 2.3 | Frontage Road | |
| 1.5 | 2.4 | Frontage Road | Southbound exit only |
| 2.2 | 3.5 | (no name) | Northbound exit and entrance |
| 2.5 | 4.0 | Bus. US 77 to Loop 574 (Martin Luther King Jr Boulevard) – McLane Stadium | Northern terminus; roadway continues north as Bus. US 77 |
1.000 mi = 1.609 km; 1.000 km = 0.621 mi: Incomplete access

== Loop 485 ==
State Highway Loop 485
- Location: Gregg County
- Length: 3.131 mi (5.039 km)
- Existed: January 30, 1970–present

Loop 485 is located in Gladewater. Its southern terminus is at a junction with US 271. It runs counterclockwise around the southern and eastern portion of the city, crossing US 80, before reaching its northern terminus at another junction with US 271.

Loop 485 was designated on January 30, 1970, from US 271 eastward and northward to US 80. It was extended to its current northern terminus on November 20, 1973.

== Loop 488 ==
State Highway Loop 488
- Location: Wilbarger County
- Length: 0.989 mi (1,592 m)
- Existed: February 25, 1970–present

Loop 488 is located in Wilbarger County.

Loop 488 was designated on February 25, 1970.

== Loop 489 ==
State Highway Loop 489
- Location: Ellis County
- Existed: March 31, 1970–June 21, 1990

Loop 489 was designated on March 31, 1970, as a loop off US 67 in Midlothian along an old routing of US 67. The route was signed as US 67 Business rather than Loop 489. On June 21, 1990, Loop 489 was cancelled and transferred to Bus. US 67 (now Spur 73 and a local route).

== Loop 491 ==
State Highway Loop 491
- Location: McLennan County
- Existed: October 2, 1970–June 21, 1990

Loop 491 was located in Waco. It is now Bus. US 77.

== Loop 493 ==
State Highway Loop 493
- Location: Lubbock County
- Length: 1.087 mi (1.749 km)
- Existed: October 2, 1970–present

Loop 493 is located in Lubbock County. It is a former routing of US 87 through the community of Woodrow.

== Loop 494 ==
State Highway Loop 494
- Location: Montgomery and Harris counties
- Length: 9.790 mi (15.755 km)
- Existed: October 2, 1970–present

Loop 494 is a state highway loop in the Greater Houston area of Texas. It is 9.7 miles (15.6 km) in length and is a former routing of US 59 in the area.

== Loop 495 ==
State Highway Loop 495
- Location: Nacogdoches County
- Existed: October 2, 1970–June 21, 1990

Loop 495 was designated on October 2, 1970, from US 59/US 259 north of Nacogdoches south to US 59/Loop 224 south of Nacogdoches along an old routing of US 59. The route was signed as US 59 Business rather than Loop 495. On June 21, 1990, Loop 495 was cancelled and transferred to Bus. US 59.

== Loop 496 ==
State Highway Loop 496
- Location: Tarrant and Johnson counties
- Existed: December 17, 1970–June 21, 1990

Loop 496 was designated on December 17, 1970, from US 81/US 287 south of Avondale to I-820 (now I-20) in Fort Worth along an old routing of US 81/US 287. Portions of the route were signed as US 81 Business and US 287 Business. On November 25, 1975, the road was extended south to FM 157 in Mansfield. On February 6, 1982, the road was extended southeast to US 287. Loop 496 was cancelled on June 21, 1990, and transferred to Bus. US 287.

== Loop 497 ==
State Highway Loop 497
- Location: Austin County
- Length: 1.888 mi (3.038 km)
- Existed: April 29, 1971–present

Loop 497 is located in Austin County. It runs from SH 36 northwest of Kenney to SH 36 southeast of Kenney.

Loop 497 was designated on April 29, 1971, on the current route along an old routing of SH 36.

=== Loop 497 (1970) ===
State Highway Loop 497
- Location: Freestone County
- Existed: December 17, 1970–?

The original Loop 497 was designated on December 17, 1970, from I-45 northeast to US 75 (now SH 75). Loop 497 was returned to the city of Fairfield when I-45 was completed between Fairfield and Streetman.

== Loop 498 ==
State Highway Loop 498
- Location: Hardin County
- Existed: November 30, 1978–June 21, 1990

Loop 498 was designated on November 30, 1978, as a loop off US 96 in Silsbee. On June 21, 1990, Loop 498 was cancelled and transferred to Bus. US 96.

== Loop 499 ==
State Highway Loop 499
- Location: Cameron County
- Length: 7.868 mi (12.662 km)
- Existed: April 29, 1971–present

Loop 499 is located in Cameron County. It runs from US 77 north of Harlingen to US 83.

Loop 499 was designated on April 29, 1971, from US 77 east and south to Loop 448 (now Bus. US 77), but was not officially added until January 31, 1973, as construction had not yet begun. On May 21, 1979, the road was extended southwest to US 83, replacing a section of FM 801.
