= Rodrigo Barnes =

American football player (1950–2023)

No. 56, 59, 55, 51
- Position: Linebacker

Personal information
- Born: February 10, 1950; Waco, Texas, U.S.
- Died: May 16, 2023 (aged 73); Dallas, Texas, U.S.
- Listed height: 6 ft 1 in (1.85 m)
- Listed weight: 215 lb (98 kg)

Career information
- High school: Carver (Waco)
- College: Rice
- NFL draft: 1973: 7th round, 176th overall pick

Career history
- Dallas Cowboys (1973–1974); New England Patriots (1974–1975); Charlotte Hornets (1975).; Miami Dolphins (1975); St. Louis Cardinals (1976)*; Oakland Raiders (1976)
- * Offseason or practice squad member only

Awards and highlights
- Super Bowl champion (XI); Second-team All-American (1971); UPI SWC Defensive Player of the Year (1971); 2× Second-Team All-SWC (1969, 1971); AP SWC Sophomore Defensive Player of the Year (1969); Rice Sports Hall of Fame (2011)

Career NFL statistics
- Games played: 35
- Fumble recoveries: 2
- Stats at Pro Football Reference

Rodrigo DeTriana Barnes (February 10, 1950 – May 16, 2023) was an American professional football player who was a linebacker in the National Football League (NFL) for the Dallas Cowboys, New England Patriots and Oakland Raiders. He played college football for the Rice Owls.

== Early life ==
Rodrigo Barnes was born in 1950 in Waco, Texas. His father was an Army veteran and his parents divorced when he was young.

Barnes attended Carver High School, which was an all-black high school at the time. He received 3A second-team All-State honors in football, in addition to participating in track. He accepted a football scholarship from Rice University, where at the time he was one of only four African-American players.

He was named the starter at middle linebacker as a sophomore, but failed one course and had two D's, which forced the school to make him ineligible to play for 1970 season. At one point, he considered transferring to the University of Southern California.

As a junior, Barnes became the first African-American to be named to the All-SWC defensive team. In his senior year, he was limited with a knee injury and a bruised kidney he suffered against Louisiana State University.

While at Rice, Barnes helped start the Black Student Union and was part of a movement to pressure the university to hire more African-American teachers and coaches. His protests were well-known on campus and garnered him a reputation for troublemaking.

In 2011, he was inducted into the Rice Athletic Hall of Fame.

== Professional career ==
=== Dallas Cowboys ===
He was selected by the Dallas Cowboys in the seventh round (176th overall) of the 1973 NFL draft, after he dropped because teams were cautious of his civil rights activism. His athletic ability and production propelled him to become the second African-American linebacker to make the team in franchise history (Ralph Coleman was the first).

Barnes could play all three linebacker positions, but he mainly competed for the middle linebacker position against Lee Roy Jordan and was a core special teams player. His best moments came in the 1973 preseason; against the Miami Dolphins, he helped stop Larry Csonka three times in a row, during a 2-yard goal-line stand and against the Kansas City Chiefs, he had 11 tackles (3 for loss) and hit backup quarterback Dean Carlson to the sidelines under the bench, which the referees thought Carlson was out of the playing field and flagged Barnes with a 15-yard personal foul penalty.

In March 1974, he was selected by the Florida Blazers in the 13th round (145th overall) of the WFL Pro Draft. His relationship with the Cowboys also started to deteriorate, with his growing belief that racial reasons were the main cause of him remaining in a reserve role. In October, he left training camp in a disagreement over playing time and salary, while also informing the team that at the recommendation of his personal doctor he was going to have knee surgery for an injury suffered in the last game of 1973. He eventually was released on November 11.

=== New England Patriots (first stint) ===
On November 11, 1974, he was claimed off waivers by the New England Patriots.

=== Charlotte Hornets ===
In 1975, Barnes played in 2 games for the Charlotte Hornets of the World Football League, until the league ceased operations at the mid-season point in 1975.

=== New England Patriots (second stint) ===
In 1975, he signed with the New England Patriots and was waived after the season opener on September 24.

=== Miami Dolphins ===
On November 19, 1975, he was signed as a free agent by the Miami Dolphins. On April 6, 1976, he was traded to the St. Louis Cardinals in exchange for a twelfth round draft choice (#342-Darryl Brandford).

=== St. Louis Cardinals ===
The St. Louis Cardinals released him on September 2, 1976.

=== Oakland Raiders ===
On November 15, 1976, the Oakland Raiders signed him as a free agent because of injuries in the linebacking corps. He was a part of the Super Bowl XI winning team, playing mainly on special teams.

Barnes retired in 1977, in part due to the numerous injuries he had sustained over his career.

== Personal life and death ==
After his NFL retirement, Barnes went back to school to get a master's degree in education. He worked as a high school assistant principal at the Garland Alternative Education Center in the Dallas area.

Barnes died in Dallas on May 16, 2023, at the age of 73.
