= Korie Black =

American football player (born 2002)

No. 38 – New York Giants
- Position: Cornerback
- Roster status: Injured reserve

Personal information
- Born: June 22, 2002 (age 24); Waco, Texas, U.S.
- Listed height: 6 ft 0 in (1.83 m)
- Listed weight: 192 lb (87 kg)

Career information
- High school: Connally (Waco, Texas)
- College: Oklahoma State (2020–2024)
- NFL draft: 2025: 7th round, 246th overall pick

Career history
- New York Giants (2025)*; New York Jets (2025); New York Giants (2025–present)
- * Offseason or practice squad member only

Career NFL statistics as of 2025
- Total tackles: 18
- Pass deflections: 1
- Stats at Pro Football Reference

Korie Louis Black (born June 22, 2002) is an American professional football cornerback for the New York Giants of the National Football League (NFL). He played college football for the Oklahoma State Cowboys and was selected by the Giants in the seventh round of the 2025 NFL draft.

== Early life ==
Black attended Connally High School in Waco, Texas. As a junior, he notched 26 tackles and six interception on defense while also catching 25 passes for 435 yards and three touchdowns on offense. Coming out of high school, Black was rated as a three-star recruit, and he committed to play college football for the Oklahoma State Cowboys alongside high school teammate Trent Pullen.

== College career ==
As a freshman in 2020, Black played in ten games, where he put up three tackles and a pass deflection. In 2021, he notched 19 tackles and two fumble recoveries. In 2022, Black recorded 25 tackles, four pass deflections, and a forced fumble. In 2023, he appeared in 13 games, where he recorded 17 tackles, five pass deflections, and an interception, while being targeted just 35 times, with a completion percentage of 45.7% for 264 yards. In 2024, Black tallied 36 tackles, nine pass deflections, and three interceptions, declaring for the 2025 NFL draft after the season.

== Professional career ==
Pre-draft measurables
Height	Weight	Arm length	Hand span	40-yard dash	10-yard split	20-yard split	20-yard shuttle	Three-cone drill	Vertical jump	Broad jump	Bench press
6 ft 0 1/4 in (1.84 m)	192 lb (87 kg)	31 in (0.79 m)	9 1/4 in (0.23 m)	4.35 s	1.58 s	2.54 s	4.34 s	7.01 s	39.0 in (0.99 m)	9 ft 9 in (2.97 m)	15 reps
All values from Pro Day

=== New York Giants (first stint) ===
Black was drafted by the New York Giants with the 246th overall pick in the seventh round of the 2025 NFL draft. He was waived on August 27, 2025.

=== New York Jets ===
On August 29, 2025, Black was signed to the New York Jets' practice squad.

=== New York Giants (second stint) ===
On October 21, 2025, Black was signed by the New York Giants off of the Jets' practice squad.

On August 30, 2026, Black was placed on injured reserve due to a groin injury, with a designation to return.
