= Eddie Bell (wide receiver) =

American football player (born 1946)

No. 7
- Position: Wide receiver

Personal information
- Born: September 13, 1946 (age 80); Waco, Texas, U.S.
- Listed height: 5 ft 10 in (1.78 m)
- Listed weight: 160 lb (73 kg)

Career information
- High school: George Washington Carver (Waco)
- College: Idaho State
- NFL draft: 1970: 9th round, 228th overall pick

Career history
- New York Jets (1970–1975); San Diego Chargers (1976)

Awards and highlights
- Second-team Little All-American (1969)

Career NFL statistics
- Receptions: 118
- Receiving yards: 1,774
- Receiving touchdowns: 12
- Stats at Pro Football Reference

Eddie Bell (born September 13, 1946) is an American former professional football player who was a wide receiver in the National Football League (NFL). He played college football for the Idaho State Bengals.

== High school ==
Bell graduated from George Washington Carver High School in Waco, Texas, in 1965. He played in the Texas high school all-star game in Houston in 1965 as a running back. On July 16, 2016, he was inducted into the Prairie View Interscholastic League Coaches Association (PVILCA) Hall of Fame.

== College ==
Bell attended Idaho State University, where he played for the Bengals from 1967 to 1969. In 1969, he was first-team all-American and holds the national record for pass receiving, with 96 receptions for 1,522 yards and 21 touchdowns in a single season. In 1969, he was selected to the All-American Bowl in Tampa, Florida coached by Bo Schembechler, Duffy Daugherty and Buddy Ryan. In 1969, he was also the Big Sky Conference 220 yard dash sprint champion. After that he was inducted into the Ring of Honor and the Hall of Fame of Idaho State. November 22, 1969 was Ed Bell Day in the city of Pocatello, Idaho for athletic accomplishments. In 2016, he was nominated for the NCAA college football Hall of Fame.

== NFL ==
Bell was selected by the New York Jets in the ninth round of the 1970 NFL draft. At the time he was thought to be the second-lightest player in club history, at 160 pounds.

The first opportunity to start was in place of the injured George Sauer, against the Baltimore Colts in the 5th game of his rookie season. He tied a club record of 12 catches in one game, along with 151 yards and one touchdown thrown by Joe Namath. He co-holds that record with Hall of Famer Don Maynard and Art Powell (wide receiver).

Bell also played for the San Diego Chargers. He played a total of 6 years for the Jets, and one for the Chargers, amassing a total of 118 receptions for 1,774 yards and 12 touchdown. Following his NFL career, he became a Los Angeles police officer and an actor, appearing on television shows including Wonder Woman, Maude and Hill Street Blues. He also worked as a cameraman on the Buffalo Bill Show.
