= Lacy Lakeview, Texas =

- City
- Motto: City on the Move
- Location of Lacy Lakeview, Texas
- Coordinates: 31°37′25″N 97°06′34″W
- Country: United States
- State: Texas
- County: McLennan

Area
  - Total: 4.18 sq mi (10.82 km^{2})
  - Land: 4.15 sq mi (10.76 km^{2})
  - Water: 0.019 sq mi (0.05 km^{2})
- Elevation: 486 ft (148 m)

Population (2020)
  - Total: 6,988
  - Density: 1,617.3/sq mi (624.45/km^{2})
- Time zone: UTC-6 (Central (CST))
  - Summer (DST): UTC-5 (CDT)
- FIPS code: 48-40168
- GNIS feature ID: 2411590
- Website: www.lacylakeview.org

Lacy Lakeview is a city in McLennan County, Texas, United States. It is part of the Waco Metropolitan Statistical Area. The population was 6,988 at the 2020 census. The city's name is sometimes spelled with a hyphen (as Lacy-Lakeview), but the official spelling omits the hyphen.

== History ==
Lacy Lakeview is the combination of two independent communities, with a third later merging.

Lacy (the older of the two communities) was named for William David Lacy, who sold lots in the area in the 1880s. Lakeview was named for its location near spring-fed lakes, and was the location of the school for both communities. Lacy and Lakeview were stations on the Texas Electric Railway, also known as the Interurban which ran between Dallas and Waco.

Neither town grew quickly; by the 1940s the combined population of the two communities was barely 120 with only four businesses.

In 1953, the two communities formed a common city government. Thereafter, the population of the new combined community quickly grew to over 2,000 residents by the early 1960s, its economy almost wholly dependent on nearby Waco.

In 1998, the city of Northcrest merged with Lacy Lakeview; this allowed the consolidated area to qualify under Texas law for home rule status.

== Geography ==
According to the United States Census Bureau, the city has a total area of 3.8 square miles (9.8 km^{2}), all land.

== Demographics ==
Historical population
Census	Pop.	Note	%±
1960	2,272		—
1970	2,558		12.6%
1980	2,752		7.6%
1990	3,617		31.4%
2000	5,764		59.4%
2010	6,489		12.6%
2020	6,988		7.7%
U.S. Decennial Census

Lacy-Lakeview racial composition as of 2020 (NH = Non-Hispanic) (Note: Note: the US Census treats Hispanic/Latino as an ethnic category. This table excludes Latinos from the racial categories and assigns them to a separate category. Hispanics/Latinos can be of any race.)
Race	Number	Percentage
White (NH)	2,859	40.91%
Black or African American (NH)	1,745	24.97%
Native American or Alaska Native (NH)	15	0.21%
Asian (NH)	44	0.63%
Some Other Race (NH)	18	0.26%
Mixed/Multi-Racial (NH)	316	4.52%
Hispanic or Latino	1,991	28.49%
Total	6,988	

As of the 2020 United States census, there were 6,988 people, 2,774 households, and 1,599 families residing in the city.

As of the census of 2000, there were 5,764 people, 2,388 households, and 1,487 families residing in the city. The population density was 1,512.8 inhabitants per square mile (584.1/km^{2}). There were 2,575 housing units at an average density of 675.8 per square mile (260.9/km^{2}). The racial makeup of the city was 74.15% White, 14.89% African American, 0.61% Native American, 0.83% Asian, 0.10% Pacific Islander, 7.01% from other races, and 2.41% from two or more races. Hispanic or Latino of any race were 16.31% of the population.

There were 2,388 households, out of which 31.1% had children under the age of 18 living with them, 42.4% were married couples living together, 15.6% had a female householder with no husband present, and 37.7% were non-families. 31.5% of all households were made up of individuals, and 6.7% had someone living alone who was 65 years of age or older. The average household size was 2.41 and the average family size was 3.07.

In the city, the population was spread out, with 26.2% under the age of 18, 15.0% from 18 to 24, 28.3% from 25 to 44, 20.2% from 45 to 64, and 10.2% who were 65 years of age or older. The median age was 31 years. For every 100 females, there were 101.0 males. For every 100 females age 18 and over, there were 97.9 males.

The median income for a household in the city was $31,135, and the median income for a family was $36,962. Males had a median income of $25,272 versus $21,250 for females. The per capita income for the city was $15,049. About 9.0% of families and 11.3% of the population were below the poverty line, including 12.2% of those under age 18 and 5.6% of those age 65 or over.

== Education ==
The majority of Lacy Lakeview is served by the Connally Independent School District, with a smaller portion served by the La Vega Independent School District in nearby Bellmead.

Connally High School, the comprehensive high school in Connally ISD, is in Lacy Lakeview.

La Vega High School is the comprehensive high school for La Vega ISD.

== Notable person ==
- Ann Richards, former Governor of Texas; was born in Lakeview
