= TCU Horned Frogs men's basketball =

Men's basketball team of Texas Christian University

| 2026–27 TCU Horned Frogs men's basketball team |
- University: Texas Christian University
- First season: 1908–09; 118 years ago
- Athletic director: Mike Buddie
- Head coach: Jamie Dixon; 11th season, 199–138 (.591)
- Location: Fort Worth, Texas
- Arena: Schollmaier Arena (capacity: 6,700)
- NCAA division: Division I
- Conference: Big 12
- Nickname: Horned Frogs
- Colors: Purple and white
- All-time record: 1,357–1,505 (.474)
- NCAA tournament record: 8–12 (.400)

NCAA Division I tournament Elite Eight
- 1968
Other NCAA Division I tournament results
| Sweet Sixteen | 1952, 1953, 1959, 1968 |
| Appearances | 1952, 1953, 1959, 1968, 1971, 1987, 1998, 2018, 2022, 2023, 2024, 2026 |

NIT champions
- 2017

Conference regular-season champions
- SWC: 1931, 1934, 1951, 1952, 1953, 1959, 1968, 1971, 1986, 1987 WAC: 1998

Uniforms
| Home | Away |

The TCU Horned Frogs men's basketball team represents Texas Christian University, located in Fort Worth, Texas, in NCAA Division I men's basketball competition. Since 2016, the Horned Frogs have been led by TCU Lettermen's Hall of Fame member, head coach Jamie Dixon. TCU has competed in the Big 12 Conference since 2012 and previously competed in the Mountain West Conference (2005–2012), Conference USA (2001–2005), Western Athletic Conference (1996–2001) and Southwest Conference (1923–1996). The Horned Frogs play their home games on campus at Ed & Rae Schollmaier Arena, formerly known as Daniel–Meyer Coliseum, which reopened in December 2015 after a $72 million renovation.

== History ==
=== Early years ===
The Horned Frogs began varsity intercollegiate competition in men's basketball in 1908, when the university was located in Waco, Texas. In their first recorded game, the Frogs faced then-cross-town rival Baylor in a 6–37 loss; the Frogs notched their first recorded program win that same season versus the Waco YMCA. TCU moved its campus from Waco to Fort Worth, Texas, after a fire destroyed the central Texas' school's main building in 1910. TCU competed as an independent and as part of the Texas Intercollegiate Athletic Association until joining Southwest Conference competition for the 1923–24 season, where the Frogs won their first-ever SWC game in a January 9, 1924, game at Rice University. During the early, independent and TIAA years, TCU was led by at least six different coaches from 1908 through 1923, and played five or fewer games or did not field teams in 7 of those 15 seasons.

=== 1920s–1970s Southwest Conference era ===
The Horned Frogs were led into the Southwest Conference in 1923 by a new basketball and football coach, Fort Worth native Matty Bell. Bell transformed the program, accruing a 71–41 (49–30 SWC) record over his six seasons at TCU and leading the Horned Frogs to second, third and fourth-place finishes during his tenure. Bell was succeeded by Francis Schmidt, who left the Arkansas Razorbacks to coach TCU basketball and football. On the gridiron, Schmidt led the Frogs to their first SWC title and the gridiron in 1932, and on the hardwood, Schmidt led the Frogs to a combined 72–24 (41–19 SWC) record over five seasons and Southwest Conference championships in 1931 and 1934. The 1931 SWC championship was the Frogs' first league title in men's basketball. Schmidt departed Fort Worth after five seasons to become the head football coach at Ohio State.

Coach Schmidt's departure after the 1934 SWC championship season was followed by a 16-year drought for TCU basketball. TCU football coach Dutch Meyer fared far better leading the Frogs' football team, where he claimed two national championships, in 1935 and 1938, and three SWC football titles over his 19-year football-coaching tenure, than he did in his three seasons at the helm of TCU basketball. Meyer's basketball record from 1934 through 1937 totaled on 10–37 (5–31 SWC). Meyer was replaced by former TCU basketball and football player Mike Brumbelow, who had two SWC wins over the following four seasons, with an overall record of 22–64 (2–46 SWC). Brumbelow was quickly replaced by Hub McQuillan, who led the Frogs to middle-of-the-league finishes in the first 5 of his 7 years as head coach of TCU basketball.

Buster Brannon, a former TCU player under Francis Schmidt, led Horned Frogs basketball for nearly two decades, from 1948 through 1967. Brannon amassed a 205–259 (104–144 SWC) record over 19 seasons and led the Frogs to four Southwest Conference championships in 1951, 1952, 1953 and 1959, and the program's first three NCAA tournament appearances in 1952, 1953 and 1959. Brannon's record faded in the 1960s, when the Frogs finished near the bottom of the league almost every year until Brannon's retirement from coaching in 1967. The Brannon era saw the opening of Daniel–Meyer Coliseum (now Schollmaier Arena) in 1961. Johnny Swaim, a former player for Brannon, coached the Frogs from 1967 through 1977. Swaim led the Frogs to Southwest Conference titles and the NCAA tournament in 1967, his first season at the helm, and in 1971. The Frogs' 1967 NCAA tournament appearance saw the Frogs' first-ever tournament win and the program's only appearance in what is now known as the Elite Eight. Swaim abruptly retired from coaching after the 1977 season, remaining in Fort Worth as a businessman until his death in 1995. After Swaim's retirement, Tim Somerville led the Frogs for the following two seasons, notching only a 10–43 (3–29 SWC) record.

=== Jamie Dixon era ===
On March 21, 2016, TCU hired Pitt head coach and former Horned Frogs' letterman Jamie Dixon as the Frogs' next head basketball coach. Prior to his return to Fort Worth as the 22nd head coach of TCU basketball, Dixon spent 13 years as the head coach at Pitt, won four national coach of the year awards, and ranked as the 9th winningest, active Division I head coach. Dixon's impact at TCU was immediate, where in his first season he landed Jaylen Fisher, the highest-rated recruit in TCU history, led the Frogs to their best conference record and finish, best overall record, and first postseason tournament since joining the Big 12 in 2012, and knocked off the No. 1 ranked Kansas Jayhawks in the 2017 Big 12 Tournament in Kansas City–marking the program's first-ever win over a #1 ranked team. The Horned Frogs won the 2017 NIT Championship on March 30, to cap off Dixon's first season with a 24–15 record. The Horned Frogs qualified as an at-large bid for the 2018 NCAA Division I men's basketball tournament, snapping a 20-year drought.

TCU made the NCAA tournament in 2022. They defeated Seton Hall 69–42 in the first round winning an NCAA tournament game for the first time in 35 years.

== Season-by-season results ==
TCU Horned Frogs Basketball Season by Season Results
1900–1909

| Season | Coach | Conference | Overall record | Conference record | Standing | Postseason |
|---|---|---|---|---|---|---|
| 1908–09 | J.R. Langley | Independent | 2–3 | – | – | – |

1910–1919

| Season | Coach | Conference | Overall record | Conference record | Standing | Postseason |
|---|---|---|---|---|---|---|
| 1909–10 | Oscar Wise | Independent | 1–4 | – | – | – |
| 1910–11 | – | – | – | – | – | – |
| 1911–12 | – | – | – | – | – | – |
| 1912–13 | – | – | – | – | – | – |
| 1913–14 | Unknown | Independent | 2–9 | – | – | – |
| 1914–15 | Frederick Cahoon | Independent | 11–12 | – | – | – |
| 1915–16 | E.Y. Freeland | Independent | 1–3 | – | – | – |
| 1916–17 | Unknown | Independent | 2–6 | – | – | – |
| 1917–18 | Unknown | Independent | 4–4 | – | – | – |
| 1918–19 | Unknown | Independent | 4–6 | – | – | – |

1920–1929

| Season | Coach | Conference | Overall record | Conference record | Standing | Postseason |
|---|---|---|---|---|---|---|
| 1919–20 | T.D. Hackney | Independent | 1–9 | – | – | – |
| 1920–21 | W.L. Driver | Independent | 0–3 | – | – | – |
| 1921–22 | W.L. Driver | Independent | 8–4 | – | – | – |
| 1922–23 | John McKnight | Independent | 3–13 | – | – | – |
| 1923–24 | Matty Bell | Southwest Conference | 16–4 | 15–4 | 2nd | – |
| 1924–25 | Matty Bell | Southwest Conference | 14–5 | 11–3 | 2nd | – |
| 1925–26 | Matty Bell | Southwest Conference | 13–9 | 7–5 | 3rd | – |
| 1926–27 | Matty Bell | Southwest Conference | 9–8 | 6–4 | 4th | – |
| 1927–28 | Matty Bell | Southwest Conference | 9–8 | 5–7 | 4th | – |
| 1928–29 | Matty Bell | Southwest Conference | 10–7 | 5–7 | 4th | – |

1930–1939

| Season | Coach | Conference | Overall record | Conference record | Standing | Postseason |
|---|---|---|---|---|---|---|
| 1929–30 | Francis Schmidt | Southwest Conference | 7–10 | 4–8 | T-6th | – |
| 1930–31 | Francis Schmidt | Southwest Conference | 18–4 | 9–3 | 1st | – |
| 1931–32 | Francis Schmidt | Southwest Conference | 18–4 | 9–3 | 2nd | – |
| 1932–33 | Francis Schmidt | Southwest Conference | 16–4 | 9–3 | 2nd | – |
| 1933–34 | Francis Schmidt | Southwest Conference | 13–2 | 10–2 | 1st | – |
| 1934–35 | Dutch Meyer | Southwest Conference | 6–13 | 2–10 | 7th | – |
| 1935–36 | Dutch Meyer | Southwest Conference | 3–11 | 2–10 | 7th | – |
| 1936–37 | Dutch Meyer | Southwest Conference | 1–13 | 1–11 | 7th | – |
| 1937–38 | Mike Brumbelow | Southwest Conference | 8–15 | 1–11 | 7th | – |
| 1938–39 | Mike Brumbelow | Southwest Conference | 2–17 | 0–12 | 7th | – |

1940–1949

| Season | Coach | Conference | Overall record | Conference record | Standing | Postseason |
|---|---|---|---|---|---|---|
| 1939–40 | Mike Brumbelow | Southwest Conference | 7–16 | 1–11 | 7th | – |
| 1940–41 | Mike Brumbelow | Southwest Conference | 5–16 | 0–12 | 7th | – |
| 1941–42 | Hub McQuillan | Southwest Conference | 13–10 | 6–6 | T-3rd | – |
| 1942–43 | Hub McQuillan | Southwest Conference | 18–9 | 5–7 | 4th | – |
| 1943–44 | Hub McQuillan | Southwest Conference | 9–12 | 6–6 | T-3rd | – |
| 1944–45 | Hub McQuillan | Southwest Conference | 9–20 | 7–5 | T-3rd | – |
| 1945–46 | Hub McQuillan | Southwest Conference | 13–11 | 6–6 | 4th | – |
| 1946–47 | Hub McQuillan | Southwest Conference | 1–22 | 1–11 | 7th | – |
| 1947–48 | Hub McQuillan | Southwest Conference | 3–20 | 1–11 | 7th | – |
| 1948–49 | Buster Brannon | Southwest Conference | 4–20 | 1–11 | 7th | – |

1950–1959

| Season | Coach | Conference | Overall record | Conference record | Standing | Postseason |
|---|---|---|---|---|---|---|
| 1949–50 | Buster Brannon | Southwest Conference | 13–11 | 5–7 | 6th | – |
| 1950–51 | Buster Brannon | Southwest Conference | 16–9 | 8–4 | T-1st | – |
| 1951–52 | Buster Brannon | Southwest Conference | 24–4 | 11–1 | 1st | NCAA tournament Sweet Sixteen |
| 1952–53 | Buster Brannon | Southwest Conference | 16–8 | 9–3 | 1st | NCAA tournament Sweet Sixteen |
| 1953–54 | Buster Brannon | Southwest Conference | 10–14 | 5–7 | 6th | – |
| 1954–55 | Buster Brannon | Southwest Conference | 17–7 | 8–4 | T-2nd | – |
| 1955–56 | Buster Brannon | Southwest Conference | 4–20 | 2–10 | 7th | – |
| 1956–57 | Buster Brannon | Southwest Conference | 14–10 | 6–6 | T-3rd | – |
| 1957–58 | Buster Brannon | Southwest Conference | 17–7 | 8–6 | 3rd | – |
| 1958–59 | Buster Brannon | Southwest Conference | 20–6 | 12–2 | 1st | NCAA tournament Sweet Sixteen |

1960–1969

| Season | Coach | Conference | Overall record | Conference record | Standing | Postseason |
|---|---|---|---|---|---|---|
| 1959–60 | Buster Brannon | Southwest Conference | 7–17 | 4–10 | 7th | – |
| 1960–61 | Buster Brannon | Southwest Conference | 5–19 | 3–11 | 7th | – |
| 1961–62 | Buster Brannon | Southwest Conference | 5–19 | 4–10 | 7th | – |
| 1962–63 | Buster Brannon | Southwest Conference | 4–20 | 1–13 | 8th | – |
| 1963–64 | Buster Brannon | Southwest Conference | 4–20 | 0–14 | 8th | – |
| 1964–65 | Buster Brannon | Southwest Conference | 6–18 | 3–11 | 7th | – |
| 1965–66 | Buster Brannon | Southwest Conference | 8–16 | 6–8 | T-6th | – |
| 1966–67 | Buster Brannon | Southwest Conference | 11–14 | 8–6 | T-2nd | – |
| 1967–68 | Johnny Swaim | Southwest Conference | 15–11 | 9–5 | 1st | NCAA tournament Elite Eight |
| 1968–69 | Johnny Swaim | Southwest Conference | 12–12 | 5–9 | T-6th | – |

1970–1979

| Season | Coach | Conference | Overall record | Conference record | Standing | Postseason |
|---|---|---|---|---|---|---|
| 1969–70 | Johnny Swaim | Southwest Conference | 10–14 | 8–6 | T-3rd | – |
| 1970–71 | Johnny Swaim | Southwest Conference | 15–12 | 11–3 | 1st | NCAA tournament first round |
| 1971–72 | Johnny Swaim | Southwest Conference | 15–9 | 9–5 | T-3rd | – |
| 1972–73 | Johnny Swaim | Southwest Conference | 4–21 | 2–12 | T-7th | – |
| 1973–74 | Johnny Swaim | Southwest Conference | 8–17 | 2–12 | 8th | – |
| 1974–75 | Johnny Swaim | Southwest Conference | 9–16 | 4–10 | T-6th | – |
| 1975–76 | Johnny Swaim | Southwest Conference | 11–16 | 6–10 | 7th | SWC Postseason Classic (0–1) |
| 1976–77 | Johnny Swaim | Southwest Conference | 3–23 | 0–16 | 9th | SWC Postseason Classic (0–1) |
| 1977–78 | Tim Somerville | Southwest Conference | 4–22 | 2–14 | T-8th | SWC Postseason Classic (0–1) |
| 1978–79 | Tim Somerville | Southwest Conference | 6–21 | 1–15 | 9th | SWC Postseason Classic (0–1) |

1980–1989

| Season | Coach | Conference | Overall record | Conference record | Standing | Postseason |
|---|---|---|---|---|---|---|
| 1979–80 | Jim Killingsworth | Southwest Conference | 7–19 | 2–14 | 9th | SWC Postseason Classic (0–1) |
| 1980–81 | Jim Killingsworth | Southwest Conference | 11–18 | 6–10 | 8th | SWC Postseason Classic (1–1) |
| 1981–82 | Jim Killingsworth | Southwest Conference | 16–13 | 9–7 | T-4th | SWC Postseason Classic (2–1) |
| 1982–83 | Jim Killingsworth | Southwest Conference | 23–11 | 9–7 | T-4th | SWC Postseason Classic (1–1); National Invitation Tournament (2–1) |
| 1983–84 | Jim Killingsworth | Southwest Conference | 11–17 | 4–12 | T-7th | SWC Postseason Classic (0–1) |
| 1984–85 | Jim Killingsworth | Southwest Conference | 16–12 | 8–8 | T-6th | SWC Postseason Classic (0–1) |
| 1985–86 | Jim Killingsworth | Southwest Conference | 22–9 | 12–4 | T-1st | SWC Postseason Classic (1–1); National Invitation Tournament (1–1) |
| 1986–87 | Jim Killingsworth | Southwest Conference | 24–7 | 14–2 | 1st | SWC Postseason Classic (0–1); NCAA tournament second round |
| 1987–88 | Moe Iba | Southwest Conference | 9–19 | 3–13 | T-8th | SWC Postseason Classic (0–1) |
| 1988–89 | Moe Iba | Southwest Conference | 17–13 | 9–7 | 3rd | SWC Postseason Classic (1–1) |

1990–1999

| Season | Coach | Conference | Overall record | Conference record | Standing | Postseason |
|---|---|---|---|---|---|---|
| 1989–90 | Moe Iba | Southwest Conference | 16–13 | 9–7 | 4th | SWC Postseason Classic (0–1) |
| 1990–91 | Moe Iba | Southwest Conference | 18–10 | 9–7 | T-4th | SWC Postseason Classic (0–1) |
| 1991–92 | Moe Iba | Southwest Conference | 23–11 | 9–5 | 3rd | SWC Postseason Classic (1–1); National Invitation Tournament (1–1) |
| 1992–93 | Moe Iba | Southwest Conference | 6–22 | 2–12 | 8th | SWC Postseason Classic (1–1) |
| 1993–94 | Moe Iba | Southwest Conference | 7–20 | 3–11 | T-7th | SWC Postseason Classic (0–1) |
| 1994–95 | Billy Tubbs | Southwest Conference | 16–11 | 8–6 | T-3rd | SWC Postseason Classic (0–1) |
| 1995–96 | Billy Tubbs | Southwest Conference | 16–14 | 6–8 | 4th | SWC Postseason Classic (1–1) |
| 1996–97 | Billy Tubbs | Western Athletic Conference | 22–13 | 7–9 | 2nd (Mountain) | WAC tournament (3–1); National Invitation Tournament (1–1) |
| 1997–98 | Billy Tubbs | Western Athletic Conference | 27–6 | 14–0 | 1st (Pacific) | WAC tournament (1–1); NCAA tournament first round |
| 1998–99 | Billy Tubbs | Western Athletic Conference | 21–11 | 7–7 | 4th (Mountain) | WAC tournament (0–1); National Invitation Tournament (2–1) |

2000–2009

| Season | Coach | Conference | Overall record | Conference record | Standing | Postseason |
|---|---|---|---|---|---|---|
| 1999–00 | Billy Tubbs | Western Athletic Conference | 18–14 | 8–6 | 4th | WAC tournament (1–1) |
| 2000–01 | Billy Tubbs | Western Athletic Conference | 20–11 | 9–7 | 4th | WAC tournament (0–1) |
| 2001–02 | Billy Tubbs | Conference USA | 16–15 | 6–10 | T-4th (National) | C-USA tournament (0–1) |
| 2002–03 | Neil Dougherty | Conference USA | 9–19 | 3–13 | 7th (National) | – |
| 2003–04 | Neil Dougherty | Conference USA | 12–17 | 7–9 | 9th | C-USA tournament (1–1) |
| 2004–05 | Neil Dougherty | Conference USA | 21–14 | 8–8 | 8th | C-USA tournament (1–1); National Invitation Tournament (2–1) |
| 2005–06 | Neil Dougherty | Mountain West Conference | 6–25 | 2–14 | 9th | MWC tournament (0–1) |
| 2006–07 | Neil Dougherty | Mountain West Conference | 13–17 | 4–12 | 9th | MWC tournament (1–1) |
| 2007–08 | Neil Dougherty | Mountain West Conference | 14–16 | 6–10 | 7th | MWC tournament (0–1) |
| 2008–09 | Jim Christian | Mountain West Conference | 14–17 | 5–11 | 7th | MWC tournament (0–1) |

2010–2019

| Season | Coach | Conference | Overall record | Conference record | Standing | Postseason |
|---|---|---|---|---|---|---|
| 2009–10 | Jim Christian | Mountain West Conference | 13–19 | 5–11 | 7th | MWC tournament (0–1) |
| 2010–11 | Jim Christian | Mountain West Conference | 11–22 | 1–15 | 9th | MWC tournament (1–1) |
| 2011–12 | Jim Christian | Mountain West Conference | 18–15 | 7–7 | 5th | MWC tournament (0–1); College Basketball Invitational (1–1) |
| 2012–13 | Trent Johnson | Big 12 Conference | 11–21 | 2–16 | 10th | Big 12 tournament (0–1) |
| 2013–14 | Trent Johnson | Big 12 Conference | 9–22 | 0–18 | 10th | Big 12 tournament (0–1) |
| 2014–15 | Trent Johnson | Big 12 Conference | 18–15 | 4–14 | 9th | Big 12tournament (1–1) |
| 2015–16 | Trent Johnson | Big 12 Conference | 12–21 | 2–16 | 10th | Big 12 tournament (1–1) |
| 2016–17 | Jamie Dixon | Big 12 Conference | 24–15 | 6–12 | T-7th | Big 12 tournament (2–1); National Invitation Tournament Champions (5–0) |
| 2017–18 | Jamie Dixon | Big 12 Conference | 21–12 | 9–9 | 5th | Big 12 tournament (0–1); NCAA tournament (0–1) |
| 2018–19 | Jamie Dixon | Big 12 Conference | 23–14 | 7–11 | T-7th | Big 12 tournament (1–1); National Invitation Tournament (3–1) |

2020–present

| Season | Coach | Conference | Overall record | Conference record | Standing | Postseason |
|---|---|---|---|---|---|---|
| 2019–20 | Jamie Dixon | Big 12 Conference | 16–16 | 7–11 | T-7th | Big 12 tournament (0–1) |
| 2020–21 | Jamie Dixon | Big 12 Conference | 12–14 | 5–11 | 8th | Big 12 tournament (0–1) |
| 2021–22 | Jamie Dixon | Big 12 Conference | 21–13 | 8–10 | T-5th | Big 12 tournament (1–1); NCAA tournament (1–1) |
| 2022–23 | Jamie Dixon | Big 12 Conference | 22–13 | 9–9 | T-5th | Big 12 tournament (1–1); NCAA tournament (1–1) |
| 2023–24 | Jamie Dixon | Big 12 Conference | 21–13 | 9–9 | T-7th | Big 12 tournament (1–1); NCAA tournament (0–1) |
| 2024–25 | Jamie Dixon | Big 12 Conference | 16–16 | 9–11 | T-9th | Big 12 tournament (0–1) |
| 2025–26 | Jamie Dixon | Big 12 Conference | 23–12 | 11–7 | T-6th | Big 12 tournament (1–1); NCAA tournament (1–1) |

Legend:
- = Conference regular season Champion
- = Conference tournament Champion
- = Conference Division Champion

== Postseason ==
=== NCAA tournament ===
The Horned Frogs have appeared in 12 NCAA tournaments. Their combined record is 8–12.

The NCAA began seeding the tournament with the 1978 edition.

| Year | Seed | Round | Opponent | Result |
|---|---|---|---|---|
| 1952 | | Sweet Sixteen; Regional 3rd-place game | Kansas; New Mexico State | L 64–68; W 61–44 |
| 1953 | | Sweet Sixteen; Regional 3rd-place game | Oklahoma A&M; Oklahoma City | L 54–71; W 58–56 |
| 1959 | | Sweet Sixteen; Regional 3rd-place game | Cincinnati; DePaul | L 73–77; W 71–65 |
| 1968 | | Sweet Sixteen; Elite Eight | Kansas State; Houston | W 77–72; L 68–103 |
| 1971 | | First round | Notre Dame | L 94–102 |
| 1987 | No. 4 | First round Second round | No. 13 Marshall; No. 5 Notre Dame | W 76–60; L 57–58 |
| 1998 | No. 5 | First round | No. 12 Florida State | L 87–96 |
| 2018 | No. 6 | First round | No. 11 Syracuse | L 52–57 |
| 2022 | No. 9 | First round Second round | No. 8 Seton Hall; No. 1 Arizona | W 69–42; L 80–85 ^{OT} |
| 2023 | No. 6 | First round Second round | No. 11 Arizona State; No. 3 Gonzaga | W 72–70; L 81–84 |
| 2024 | No. 9 | First round | No. 8 Utah State | L 72–88 |
| 2026 | No. 9 | First round Second round | No. 8 Ohio State; No. 1 Duke | W 66–64; L 58–81 |

=== NIT ===
The Horned Frogs have appeared in eight National Invitation Tournaments (NIT). Their combined record is 17–7. They were NIT champions in 2017.

| Year | Round | Opponent | Result |
|---|---|---|---|
| 1983 | First round Second round Quarterfinals | Tulsa; Arizona State; Nebraska | W 64–62; W 78–76; L 57–67 |
| 1986 | First round Second round | Montana; Florida | W 76–69; L 75–77 |
| 1992 | First round Second round | Long Beach State; Purdue | W 73–61; L 51–67 |
| 1997 | First round Second round | UAB; Notre Dame | W 85–62; L 72–82 |
| 1999 | First round Second round Quarterfinals | Kansas State; Nebraska; Oregon | W 72–71; W 101–89; L 68–77 |
| 2005 | First round Second round Quarterfinals | Miami (OH); Western Michigan; Maryland | W 60–58; W 78–68; L 73–85 |
| 2017 | First round Second round Quarterfinals; Semifinals; Championship | Fresno State; Iowa; Richmond; UCF; Georgia Tech | W 66–59; W 94–92^{OT} W 86–68; W 68–53; W 88–56 |
| 2019 | First round Second round Quarterfinals; Semifinals | Sam Houston State; Nebraska; Creighton; Texas | W 80–76; W 88–72; W 71–58; L 44–58 |

=== CBI ===
The Horned Frogs have appeared in one College Basketball Invitational (CBI). Their record is 1–1.

| Year | Round | Opponent | Result |
|---|---|---|---|
| 2012 | First round Quarterfinals | Milwaukee; Oregon State | W 83–73; L 81–101 |

== Retired numbers ==
TCU has retired five numbers.

TCU Horned Frogs retired jerseys
| No. | Player | Pos. | Career | Ref. |
| 24 | Darrell Browder | G | 1979–1983 | |
| 28 | Dick O'Neal | PF | 1954–1957 | |
| 34 | Kenrich Williams | SG/SF | 2014–2018 | |
| 40 | Kurt Thomas | PF | 1990–1995 | |
| 54 | James Cash Jr. (Note: Cash was the first black student/athlete at TCU and the first black basketball player in the Southwest Conference.) | C | 1966–1969 | |
| 1 | Desmond Bane | G | 2016-2020 | |

== NBA/ABA players ==
- Desmond Bane
- Damion Baugh
- Scott Brooks
- Goo Kennedy
- George McLeod
- Emanuel Miller
- Lee Nailon
- R.J. Nembhard
- Dennis Nutt
- Micah Peavy
- Reggie Smith
- Kurt Thomas
- Gary Turner
- Kenrich Williams
