= Northcrest, Texas =

Coordinates: 31°38′12″N 97°05′59″W

Northcrest was a city in north central McLennan County, Texas (USA). The city's name came from its location (6 miles (9.7 km)) north of Waco and its elevation, which is the highest in the Waco area.

Northcrest was incorporated as a city in February 1958 with a mayor–council form of government. The city's population was 625 in 1960. By 1970, that figure had risen to 1,669 as it developed into a primarily residential community with an economy heavily dependent on nearby cities.

In the late 1980s, Northcrest was home to approximately 2,200 residents. That number fell to 1,725 by 1990.

Northcrest merged with the neighboring city of Lacy Lakeview in 1998.

== Education ==
Connally Independent School District is the school district of the former municipality.

Connally High School was in the municipality.
