= Connally High School (Lacy Lakeview, Texas) =

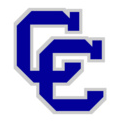

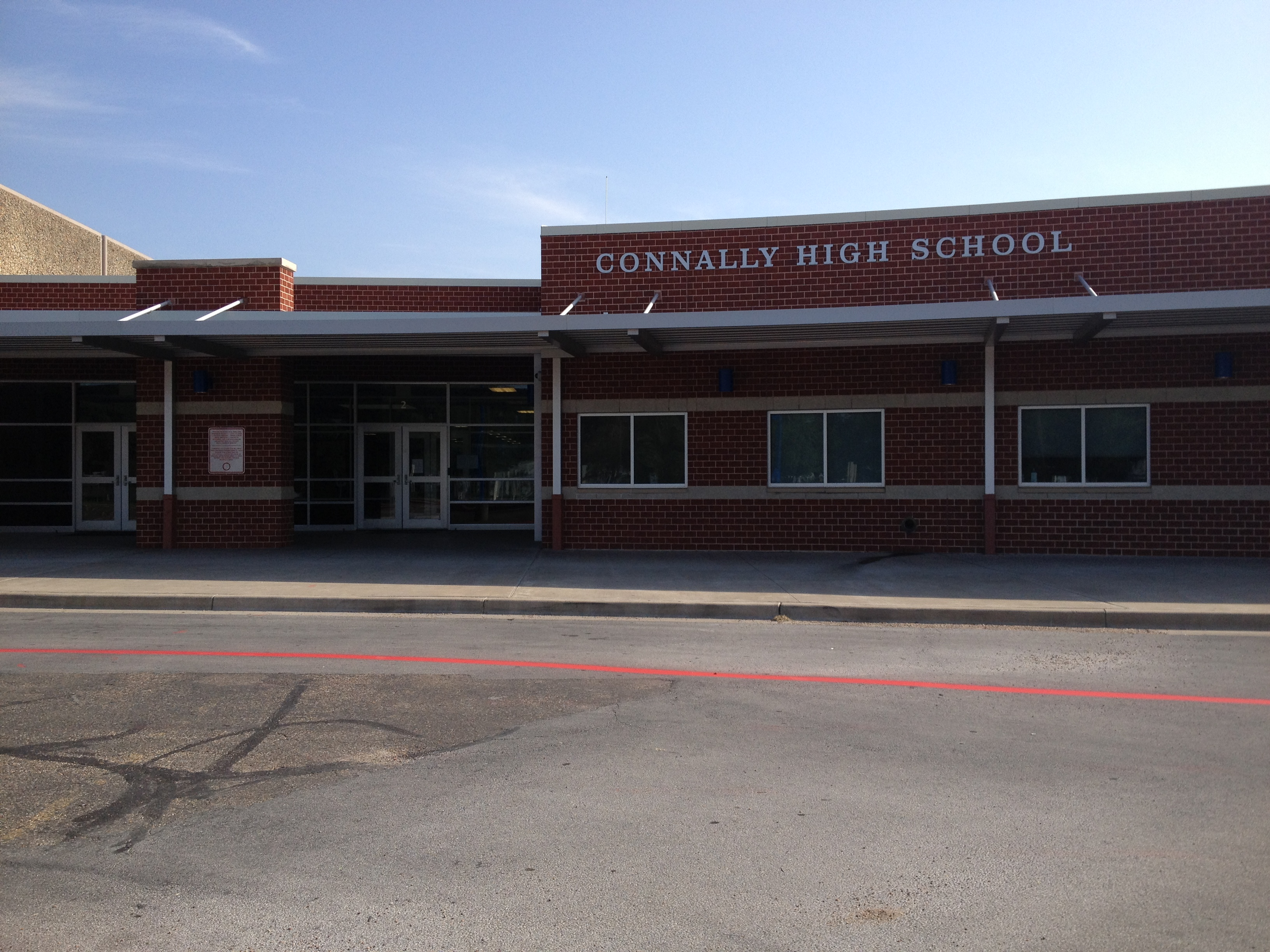
- Home of the Cadets!

Location
- 200 Cadet Way; Waco, Texas 76705; United States; 31.642420°N 97.102326°W

Information
- Type: Public high school
- Motto: PRIDE: Personal Responsibility In Daily Efforts
- School district: Connally Independent School District
- Principal: Jessica Weeks
- Teaching staff: 49.44 (FTE)
- Grades: 9−12
- Enrollment: 621 (2023–2024)
- Student to teacher ratio: 12.56
- Colors: Royal Blue & Grey
- Athletics conference: UIL Class AAAA
- Mascot: Cadet/Lady Cadet
- Rivals: La Vega Pirates
- Yearbook: The Cadet
- Website: highschool.connally.org

Connally High School is a public high school located in Lacy Lakeview, Texas, United States, with a Waco postal address. A part of the Connally Independent School District, it is located in northern McLennan County.

It is classified as a 4A school by the UIL. In 2015, the school was rated "Met Standard" by the Texas Education Agency.

== History ==
Connally Independent School District was created in the 1950−51 school year when the already established Elm Mott School District consolidated with Lakeview School District. The new school's title was Connally Consolidated School District in honor of Colonel James T. Connally and the former air force base of the same title. This tradition is carried over onto the school's mascot, the Cadet. At the time, the school system taught only to the tenth grade but eventually expanded to teach all twelve grade levels when the first high school campus was built on a fifteen-acre tract of land. From that moment on the school began to grow rapidly until a fire destroyed it on April 8, 1974. The only structural portions of the building that survived the disaster were the gym and the home economics building. During the period of time immediately following the accident, classes were held in local churches while the new campus was being built. The construction of the new Connally High School was completed in 1976 and is still in operation today. Since its initial opening, CHS has made certain renovations including new science labs, a new athletic complex, and additions and updates to the front of the building.

The school was formerly in the municipality of Northcrest. The municipality of Northcrest merged into the municipality of Lacy Lakeview in 1998.

=== Aftermath of the West Fertilizer Company explosion ===
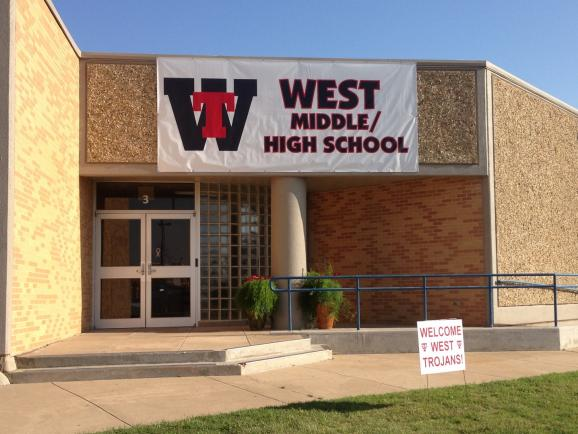
A sign christening the temporary campuses.

After the devastating West Fertilizer Company explosion on April 17, 2013, leaders of West ISD had to find buildings to temporarily relocate their middle and high school students. The decision was made to house these students at Connally ISD, and accommodations were immediately made at the high school campus in order to help house the additional people. After a few days of intense labor, CISD students, teachers, administrators, and community members had completely renovated the high school's East Campus as well as the old Intermediate Center (5−6 grade). With the help of several donations, the buildings were made fully operational for the students from West to attend school as soon as possible. Robinson Independent School District donated banners to be placed on the buildings that read "West Middle/High School" and Bosqueville Independent School District provided lunches for the students and staff for a bit. Several other local districts sent a huge amount of support through donations of both school supplies and money. Upon arriving at Connally, the Trojans were given a warm welcome by the Cadets, and were invited to attend many events with their housing campus. The senior classes combined to attend a trip to Six Flags for a day, and the English classes attended a showing of The Great Gatsby with one another.

The largest event between the two districts occurred when they traveled out to the football stadium to have a joint PRIDE Assembly, an incentive program set up earlier in the year by CHS Principal Jill Talamantez. Despite the fact that the program typically called for students to meet certain grade, attendance, and behavioral requirements before receiving the reward (a free shirt), every individual that entered the stadium was given a free bright red T-shirt which adorned the logos of both CISD and West ISD along with the phrase "Strength in Unity". The event continued on to include performances by a local singer, games, and additional prizes. Another act of compassion occurred during the assembly when a Connally student who had advanced to the state competition in UIL Science gave her gold medal to the student from West who she replaced. Claire Cook, a student from West, had placed 3rd at the district meet earlier in the year but was unable to attend the regional contest which fell the Saturday after the explosion. Lyndsey Wilson, the CHS student who took her spot as an alternate ended up placing 1st in the biology segment of the test and advanced to the state contest. Wilson gave her medal to Cook at her own discretion in the middle of the event in front of everyone. At the completion of the 2012–2013 school year it was announced that West would be returning to their own soil in portables for the next year.

== Extracurricular activities ==
Connally High School is a UIL participating school with numerous appearances at state level events. The school competes in Conference AAAA events and recognizes all UIL-sanctioned events. The school also offers a number of chapters in nationally recognized organizations such as NHS, Key Club, FCA, etc. In addition to these nationally recognized groups, CHS has also created a number of clubs and organizations for students to participate in such as Student Council, HOSA, Skills USA, and QSA. The 2019–2020 school year saw a revitalization of the Spanish Club.

=== Athletics ===
The Connally Cadets compete in these sports -

- Baseball
- Basketball
- Cross Country
- Football
- Powerlifting
- Soccer
- Softball
- Track and Field
- Volleyball

==== State titles ====
- Boys Track
  - 1993(3A)
- Girls Track
  - 2009(3A), 2012(3A)

The football team won the District 17-AAA championship in 2005 and advanced all the way to the Regional Finals game, falling to Giddings High School 57–36. The 2019–2020 school year saw a tremendous season. Not only did the Cadets win the District 18-AAAA championship with a perfect regular season record (10-0), they advanced to the third round in the UIL State playoffs, ending the season with an overall record of (12-1), the second best season a Connally football has ever seen. The school has participated recent successes in athletics in boys basketball (Regional Semi Finalists – 2013). and girls soccer (bi-district playoffs – 2011, 2012, 2013). Most notably, the school has shown success in Track & Field. The boys team won the Conference AAA State Championship in 1993, and the girls won the same championship in 2009 and again in 2012. The girls placed 2nd at the state meet in 2010. The boys currently hold the AAA record in the 1600 meter relay.

=== Academics ===
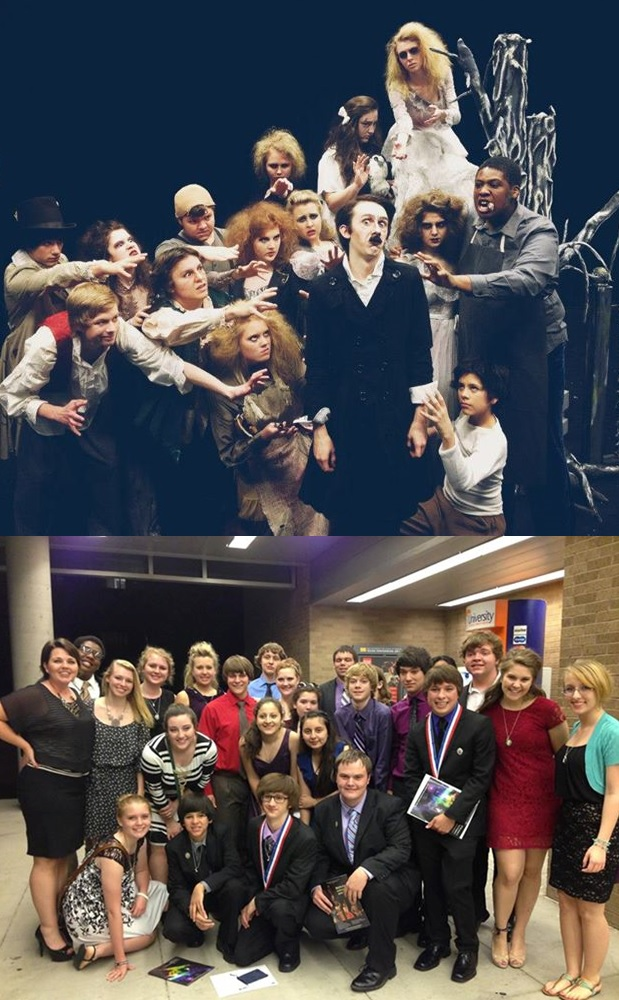
The company of the 2013 UIL One Act Play, Maelstrom, at the state meet.

The CHS Academic Team has consistently been considered a powerhouse of the Central Texas Area, most recently winning the UIL Region III AAA Academic Sweepstakes in 2013. Connally's Speech and Debate Program has won the District Championship for the past four years, and the regional championship for the past two. The school's Theatre Department has also experienced great successes. The CHS Thespians have advanced to the State One Act Play Meet three times (2006, 2010, and 2013), placing 2nd in 2010 (sf Paganini by Don Nigro) and 5th in 2013 (sf Maelstrom by Don Nigro).

=== Music ===
The CHS Band is led by director Dr. Nora Mosby. The ensemble's name was "The Pride of the Cadets". The band competes in UIL Marching Contest as well as UIL Concert and Sight Reading Contest. In 2008 the band advanced to the Area Marching Band Contest, but did not advance to the finals. The group was also known for being the only program in the Central Texas area to perform at the Veterans Day ceremony at the Waco Veteran's Hospital.

The CHS “Royal Eight” Winter Guard was established for the 2013 contest season. The guard received a first division at the state contest in 2013.

In the 2025 - 2026 season, the CHS Varsity Band (Wind Ensemble) competed in the UIL Concert and Sight-Reading Contest and achieved a 1st division for both contests. This was the first time the band achieved this sweepstakes rating since 2008.

== Dress code ==
In the 2011−12 school year the Connally Independent School District's school board approved a suggestion to enforce a standardized dress code. The dress policy, which is similar to school uniforms, required students to wear solid colored collared shirts and slacks of selected colors. The regulation also severely limited what accessories and pieces of footwear were appropriate as well as when school spirit shirts could be worn. Eventually, the high school campus installed a "PRIDE" program (short for Personal Responsibility In Daily Efforts) as an incentive for good behavior and high grades. Students who followed the procedures of the program were given a free T-shirt which could be worn at any time during the week with jeans. High school principal Jill Talamantez incorporated the program heavily throughout the year, and the adaptation to the dress code gradually shifted towards becoming the school's official motto. Despite the initiative of the PRIDE program, however, a board meeting on July 22, 2013, altered the dress code again. After two years of standardized dress, the board approved a suggestion to dismiss the policy and return to the more relaxed dress code. The current policy calls for modestly cut bottoms and appropriate T-shirts. Men must be clean shaven and no individual can have unnatural hair colors. Piercings are heavily regulated and hats are not allowed indoors. This dress code was only enforced for one year. The dress code was no longer a uniform style dress code.

== Notable alumni ==
- Korie Black (2020), cornerback for the New York Giants
- Jelani McDonald (2023), safety for the Texas Longhorns
