= Buster Brannon =

American football and basketball player and coach

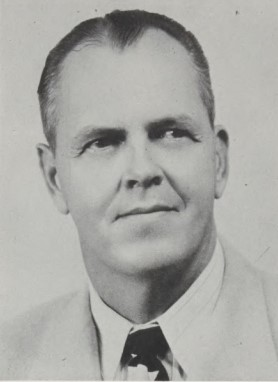
- Brannon c. 1958

Biographical details
- Born: October 21, 1908; Pine Bluff, Arkansas, U.S.
- Died: April 14, 1979 (aged 70); Fort Worth, Texas, U.S.

Playing career

Football
- 1931–1932: TCU

Basketball
- 1930–1933: TCU
- Positions: Quarterback (football); Guard (basketball)

Coaching career (HC unless noted)

Basketball
- 1938–1942: Rice
- 1945–1946: Rice
- 1948–1967: TCU

Football
- 1946–1947: Florida (assistant)
- 1949–1954: TCU (assistant)

Head coaching record
- Overall: 289–296
- Tournaments: 4–6 (NCAA / NCAA University Division)

Accomplishments and honors

Championships
- 6 SWC regular season (1940, 1942, 1951–1953, 1959)

Byron Scott "Buster" Brannon (October 21, 1908 – April 14, 1979) was an American football and basketball player and coach. He served as the head basketball coach at Rice University from 1938 to 1942 and again from 1945 to 1946 and at Texas Christian University (TCU) from 1948 to 1967, compiling a career college basketball record of 289–296. His teams played in five NCAA tournaments and won six Southwest Conference championships. Brannon died of a heart attack on April 14, 1979.

== Early life ==
Brannon was born on October 21, 1908, in Pine Bluff, Arkansas.

== Head coaching record ==
Record table
Season	Team	Overall	Conference	Standing	Postseason
Rice Owls (Southwest Conference) (1938–1942)
1938–39	Rice	10–11	6–6	5th	
1939–40	Rice	25–4	10–2	1st	NCAA Regional Third Place
1940–41	Rice	18–6	8–4	2nd	
1941–42	Rice	22–5	10–2	T–1st	NCAA Regional Fourth Place
Rice Owls (Southwest Conference) (1945–1946)
1945–46	Rice	10–11	5–7	5th	
Rice:		85–37 (.697)	39–21 (.650)		
TCU Horned Frogs (Southwest Conference) (1948–1967)
1948–49	TCU	4–20	1–11	7th	
1949–50	TCU	14–11	5–7	6th	
1950–51	TCU	16–9	8–4	T–1st	
1951–52	TCU	24–4	11–1	1st	NCAA Regional Third Place
1952–53	TCU	16–8	9–3	1st	NCAA Regional Third Place
1953–54	TCU	10–14	5–7	6th	
1954–55	TCU	17–7	8–4	T–2nd	
1955–56	TCU	4–20	2–10	7th	
1956–57	TCU	14–10	6–6	T–3rd	
1957–58	TCU	17–7	8–6	T–3rd	
1958–59	TCU	20–6	12–2	1st	NCAA University Division Regional Third Place
1959–60	TCU	7–17	4–10	7th	
1960–61	TCU	5–19	3–11	7th	
1961–62	TCU	5–19	3–11	7th	
1962–63	TCU	4–20	1–13	8th	
1963–64	TCU	4–20	0–14	8th	
1964–65	TCU	6–18	3–11	6th	
1965–66	TCU	8–16	6–8	T–6th	
1966–67	TCU	10–14	8–6	T–2nd	
TCU:		204–259 (.441)	103–145 (.415)		
Total:		289–296 (.494)			
National champion Postseason invitational champion Conference regular season champion Conference regular season and conference tournament champion Division regular season champion Division regular season and conference tournament champion Conference tournament champion
