= La Vega High School =

Location
- 555 N Loop 340; Waco, Texas 76705-2573; United States
- Coordinates: 31.6019°N 97.0983°W

Information
- School type: Public high school
- School district: La Vega Independent School District
- Superintendent: Sharon M Shields
- Principal: James Villa
- Teaching staff: 61.72 (FTE)
- Grades: 9-12
- Enrollment: 877 (2023-2024)
- Student to teacher ratio: 14.21
- Colors: Royal Blue & Gold
- Athletics conference: UIL Class AAAA
- Mascot: Petey The Pirate
- Yearbook: Treasure Chest
- Website: lvhs.lavegaisd.org

La Vega High School is a public high school located in the city of Bellmead, Texas, United States and classified as a 4A school by the University Interscholastic League (UIL). It is a part of the La Vega Independent School District located in central McLennan County and also includes students from Waco. When the school opened, only white students were allowed to attend. In 1970, federally mandated integration caused African-American students from Carver High School to be rezoned to La Vega. In 2015, the school was rated "Met Standard" by the Texas Education Agency.

== Athletics ==
The La Vega Pirates compete in these sports

Volleyball, Cross Country, Football, Basketball, Powerlifting, Soccer, Track, Baseball & Softball

=== State Titles ===
- Boys Basketball
  - 2000(3A)
- Boys Soccer
  - 2026(4A/D1)
- Boys Track
  - 2019(4A)
  - 2021(4A)
- Football -
  - 2015(4A/D1) - defeated Argyle in the state championship 33-31 to finish the season 16-0.
  - 2018(4A/D1) - defeated Liberty Hill in the state championship 35-21 to finish the season 14-2.
- Girls Basketball
  - 2014(3A), 2023(4A), 2024(4A)
- Girls Track
  - 1995(3A)

==== State Finalist ====
- Girls Basketball
  - 1994(3A), 2025(4A/D1)
- Football
  - 1951(1A)
  - 2008(3A/D1)
  - 2019(4A/D1)
  - 2025(4A/D2)
  - 2026(4A/D2)

== Notable alumni ==
- Julia Penny Clark, labor lawyer
- Katrina Price, professional basketball player
- Beasley Reece, former NFL football player
- Arthur Rhodes, former MLB pitcher 1991-2011
- Dax Swanson, NFL football player
