= La Vega Independent School District =

School district in Texas

Coordinates: 31.5934°N 97.0835°W

Location
- Bellmead, TX ESC Region 12 USA

District information
- Type: Public
- Motto: "Making Excellence a Tradition"
- Grades: Pre-K through 12
- Established: 1927
- Superintendent: Dr. Sharon M. Shields

Students and staff
- Athletic conference: UIL Class AAAA
- Colors: Blue and Gold

Other information
- Mascot: Pirate
- Website: La Vega ISD

La Vega Independent School District is a public school district based in Bellmead, Texas (USA).

The district is located in central McLennan County and serves the vast majority of Bellmead, as well as parts of Waco and Lacy-Lakeview.

It was ranked "academically acceptable" by the Texas Education Agency.

== History ==
The La Vega Independent School District was formed in 1927 from the consolidation of the Pecan Grove, Oak Grove, and West Brook Schools.

Board members of the new district turned over the task of finding a name for the district to the PTAs of the former Oak Grove and Pecan Grove Schools. Pecan Grove PTA favored Bellmead Schools, but Bellmead was not an incorporated city at the time. The Oak Grove PTA suggested La Vega Schools, taken from the Mexican land grant of Tomas de la Vega which encompassed the area where the new school was to be built. The final vote was 25 to 4 in favor of La Vega.

== Schools ==
- La Vega High School (Grades 9–12)
- La Vega Junior High – George Dixon Campus (Grades 7–8)
- La Vega Intermediate – H.P. Miles Campus (Grades 4–6)
- La Vega Elementary (Grades 1–3)
- La Vega Primary (Grades PK-K)
