= Elm Mott, Texas =

Unincorporated community in Texas, US

Coordinates: 31°40′19″N 97°05′56″W

Elm Mott is an unincorporated community in McLennan County, Texas, United States. It is located near the intersection of Interstate 35 and Farm to Market Road 308, eight miles north of Waco.

Elm Mott is part of the Waco Metropolitan Statistical Area.

== History ==
The area was settled shortly after the Civil War. The community was known as Geneva until residents applied for a post office in 1872. As there was already a Geneva, the name Elm Mott was chosen, for a nearby elm grove.

By the 1890s, the community had approximately 150 residents. Its population grew to 247 by 1900 and 300 by 1914. In spite of a drought and the Great Depression, Elm Mott maintained a population of 250 during the 1920s and 1930s.

In 1951, the Elm Mott Independent School District merged with the Lakeview Independent School District to form the Connally Independent School District.

The population of Elm Mott stood at 275 in the 1950s, fell to 260 in the 1960s, then grew from a population of 190 in the 1970s to an area population of 3,113 with 1,244 housing units as cited by ZIP Code Tabulation Area (ZCTA) of 76640. U.S. Census Data of 2000 breaks down this 3,113 figure to 904 residing within the urban Elm Mott community and 2,209 residing in the rural areas surrounding the (Class Code U6) community.

== Education ==
It is in the Connally Independent School District.
