= Bellmead, Texas =

- City
- Interactive map of Bellmead, Texas
- Coordinates: 31°36′48″N 97°05′12″W
- Country: United States
- State: Texas
- County: McLennan

Area
  - Total: 6.95 sq mi (17.99 km^{2})
  - Land: 6.90 sq mi (17.87 km^{2})
  - Water: 0.046 sq mi (0.12 km^{2})
- Elevation: 453 ft (138 m)

Population (2020)
  - Total: 10,494
  - Density: 1,557.6/sq mi (601.38/km^{2})
- Time zone: UTC-6 (Central (CST))
  - Summer (DST): UTC-5 (CDT)
- ZIP codes: 76704-76705
- Area code: 254
- FIPS code: 48-07408
- GNIS feature ID: 2409824
- Website: https://bellmeadtx.gov/

Bellmead is a city in McLennan County, Texas, United States. The population was 10,494 at the 2020 census. It is part of the Waco Metropolitan Statistical Area.

== Geography ==
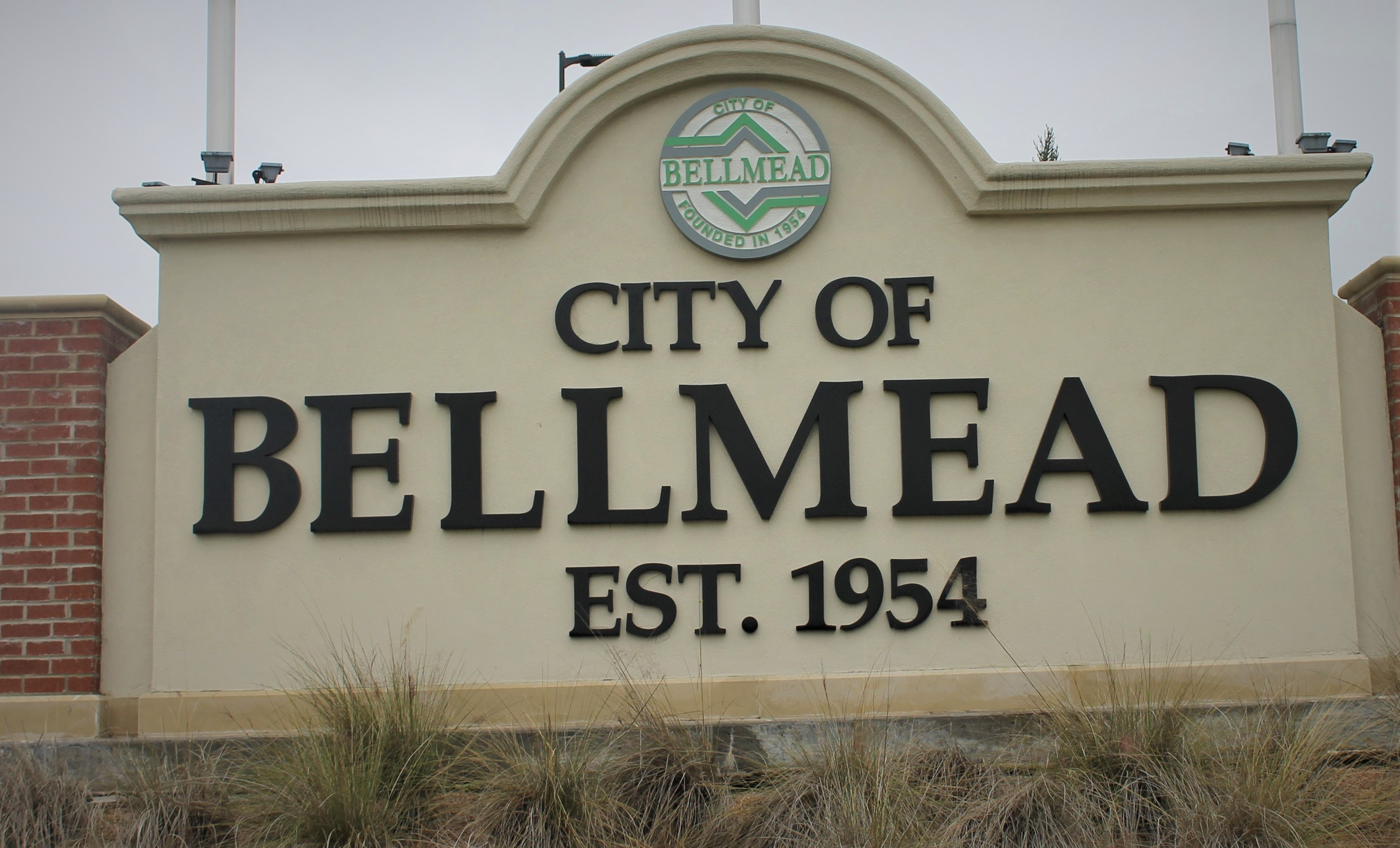
Bellmead (founded 1954)

According to the United States Census Bureau, the city has a total area of 6.2 square miles (16 km^{2}), all land.

== Demographics ==
Historical population
Census	Pop.	Note	%±
1960	5,127		—
1970	7,698		50.1%
1980	7,569		−1.7%
1990	8,336		10.1%
2000	9,214		10.5%
2010	9,901		7.5%
2020	10,494		6.0%
U.S. Decennial Census

=== Racial and ethnic composition ===
Bellmead city, Texas – Racial and ethnic composition Note: the US Census treats Hispanic/Latino as an ethnic category. This table excludes Latinos from the racial categories and assigns them to a separate category. Hispanics/Latinos may be of any race.
Race / Ethnicity (NH = Non-Hispanic)	Pop 2000	Pop 2010	Pop 2020	% 2000	% 2010	% 2020
White alone (NH)	5,497	4,204	3,604	59.66%	42.46%	34.34%
Black or African American alone (NH)	1,334	1,703	1,973	14.48%	17.20%	18.80%
Native American or Alaska Native alone (NH)	37	35	49	0.40%	0.35%	0.47%
Asian alone (NH)	52	63	46	0.56%	0.64%	0.44%
Native Hawaiian or Pacific Islander alone (NH)	4	0	2	0.04%	0.00%	0.02%
Other race alone (NH)	2	10	17	0.02%	0.10%	0.16%
Mixed race or Multiracial (NH)	93	144	298	1.01%	1.45%	2.84%
Hispanic or Latino (any race)	2,195	3,742	4,505	23.82%	37.79%	42.93%
Total	9,214	9,901	10,494	100.00%	100.00%	100.00%

=== 2020 census ===
As of the 2020 census, there were 10,494 people and 2,417 families residing in the city. The median age was 34.0 years. 28.6% of residents were under the age of 18 and 13.1% of residents were 65 years of age or older. For every 100 females there were 97.2 males, and for every 100 females age 18 and over there were 92.7 males age 18 and over.

97.6% of residents lived in urban areas, while 2.4% lived in rural areas.

There were 3,590 households in Bellmead, of which 39.7% had children under the age of 18 living in them. Of all households, 39.5% were married-couple households, 20.5% were households with a male householder and no spouse or partner present, and 32.8% were households with a female householder and no spouse or partner present. About 24.3% of all households were made up of individuals and 11.2% had someone living alone who was 65 years of age or older.

There were 3,925 housing units, of which 8.5% were vacant. Among occupied housing units, 62.2% were owner-occupied and 37.8% were renter-occupied. The homeowner vacancy rate was 1.4% and the rental vacancy rate was 7.9%.

Racial composition as of the 2020 census
Race	Percent
White	41.7%
Black or African American	19.6%
American Indian and Alaska Native	2.2%
Asian	0.4%
Native Hawaiian and Other Pacific Islander	<0.1%
Some other race	23.0%
Two or more races	13.1%

=== 2010 census ===
As of the census of 2010, there were 9,901 people, 3,513 households, and a labor force size of 4,756 people. The population density was 571.0 people/km^{2} (1,479 people/mi^{2}). The racial makeup of the city was 42.5% White, 17.2% African American, 0.4% Native American, 0.6% Asian, 0.1% from other races, and 1.5% from two or more races. Hispanic or Latino of any race is 37.8% of the population.

There were 3,513 households, out of which 47.01% had children under the age of 18 living with them. Within the population, 30.5% are under 18 years of age. The average household size was 2.5. Women comprise 48.9% of the population while men make up 51.1%.

The average income for a household in the city was $43,523, and the median income for a family was $34,511. The per capita income for the city was $16,910. Within the population 65.7% have graduated from high school and nearly 11% of these people have completed a higher degree.

== Education ==
The vast majority of Bellmead is in the La Vega Independent School District while a small portion is in the Connally Independent School District.

The respective comprehensive high schools of these districts are La Vega High School and Connally High School.
