= Cameron Park =

Cameron Park may refer to:

== Places ==
- Cameron Park, California, United States
- Cameron Park Historic District in Raleigh, North Carolina, United States
- Cameron Park, New South Wales, Australia
- Cameron Park, Texas, United States
- Cameron Park Zoo, in Waco, Texas
- Cameron Park (Waco), in Waco, Texas

== People ==
- Cameron Park (footballer) (born 1992), English association football player
