= Cameron Park (Waco, Texas) =

Urban park in Waco, Texas, US

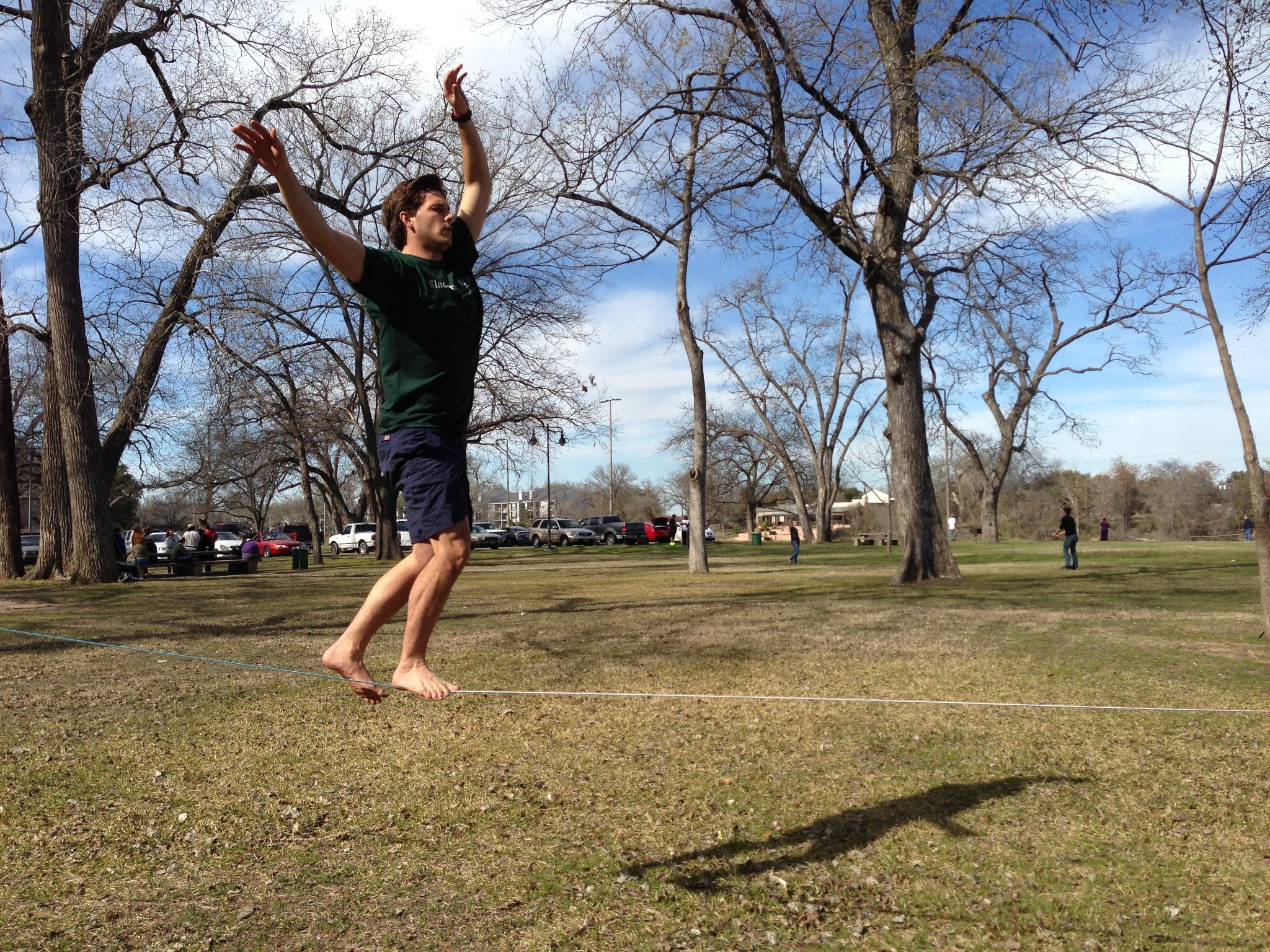
- Recreation in Cameron Park

- Location within Texas
- Interactive map of Cameron Park
- Type: Public park
- Location: Waco, Texas 76708
- Coordinates: 31°35′6″N 97°9′30″W
- Area: 416 acres (168 ha)
- Created: 1910

Cameron Park is a 416-acre (168 ha) urban park located in Waco, Texas. The park was dedicated on May 27, 1910, and named in memory of Waco philanthropist and lumber baron William Cameron. The park also contains Waco's 52-acre (21 ha) zoo, the Cameron Park Zoo.

== History ==
In the early 20th century, as Waco continued to develop as the urban heart of McLennan County and the progressive movement was rising throughout America, Waco citizens began to clamor for more parks and green spaces to be preserved for public use. Many wanted to make Proctor Springs, a popular gathering site near the Brazos River that had become subject to commercialization around the turn of the century, the site of a new city park. Before the city could act, the land was purchased for $25,000 by a businessman, W.C. Lawson. Despite this apparent setback, the hopes of Wacoans to preserve Proctor Springs were not lost; on May 24, 1910, Flora B. Cameron, wife of the late William Cameron, announced that she was donating all 125 acres (51 ha) of the land to the city of Waco. Mrs. Cameron revealed that she had purchased the land with Lawson as a liaison with the intention of donating it as a park in memory of her late husband. The gift came attached with a $5,000 gift for park development, as well as stipulations to preserve the name and funding for the park, and to prohibit commercial enterprise within its borders. The park was officially dedicated on May 27, 1910, with a large ceremony attended by nearly 15,000 people. Baylor University President Samuel Palmer Brooks served as the master of ceremonies for the dedication.

After the establishment of the park, the Cameron family continued to support its expansion and development, with gifts of land made in 1917 and 1920 that extended the park from the original site at Proctor Springs along the Brazos and Bosque all the way to Lover's Leap, a popular cliff formation. These gifts more than doubled the size of the park, and left it at the size it is today. During the Great Depression, federal workers affiliated with New Deal programs constructed trails, water drains, and retaining walls to improve the park. From this point, up until the mid-1960s, the park enjoyed significant popularity among Wacoans. In that decade, however, a controversy developed over plans to construct a bridge across the Brazos at Herring Avenue that would link East Waco more directly with the park. A combination of factors, including animosity towards the new park entrance, greater vehicular traffic, and racial factors stemming from the demographic makeup of East Waco, led popularity of the park to steeply drop. As attendance dropped, the facilities in the park began to deteriorate, and criminal activity in the park began to increase.

Until the late 1980s, Cameron Park continued to fall into disrepair and disuse. At the end of that decade, however, a revitalization process began to restore the park's former beauty and popularity. Congressman W. R. Pogue made a donation of $100,000 towards a wildflower preserve in honor of his late mother, known as Miss Nellie's Pretty Place. A greater police presence, including mounted police, was established to patrol the park. The opening of the Cameron Park Zoo in 1993 and the expansion of trails throughout that decade helped bring Cameron Park back to popularity among the entire population of the Waco area.

== Present day ==
Today, Cameron Park is one of the largest city parks in Texas, with over 20 miles (32 km) of trails, a disc golf course, cross country running course, recreational courts and playgrounds, picnic areas, and the Cameron Park Zoo. It celebrated its centenary in 2010, and funds raised for that celebration will be funding a new limestone pavilion in the park, set to be completed in the summer of 2015.
