= Cameron Park Zoo =

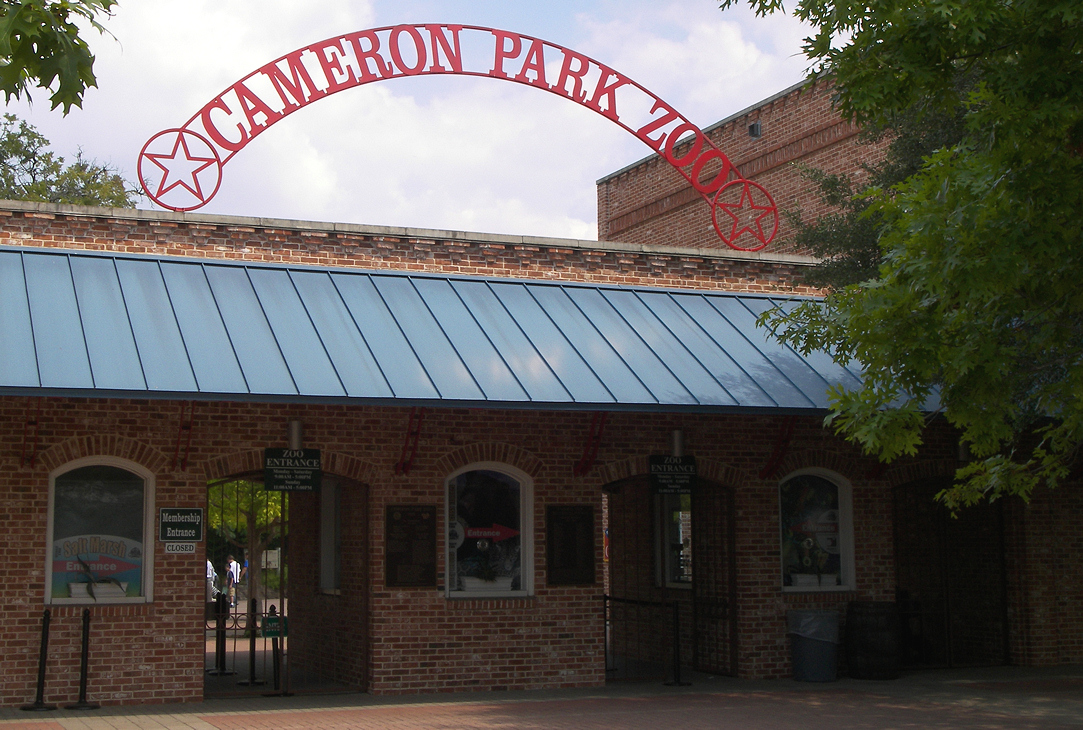
- Main entrance
- Interactive map of Cameron Park Zoo
- 31°34′12″N 97°8′41″W
- Date opened: 1993
- Location: Waco, Texas, United States
- Land area: 52 acres (21 ha)
- No. of animals: 1,731
- No. of species: 300
- Memberships: AZA, WAZA
- Website: www.cameronparkzoo.com

Cameron Park Zoo is a 52-acre (21 ha) natural habitat zoo located within Cameron Park in the city of Waco, Texas, United States, next to the Brazos River. Established in July 1993, Cameron Park Zoo has native vegetation that surrounds waterfalls, a lake, and ponds. The zoo features a diverse collection that includes over 1731 animals, representing 300 species from around the world. The zoo keeps a single female African savanna Elephant named Tembo, who was born in the wild in 1977 and arrived in Waco on January 15th, 1979.

The Cameron Park Zoo is accredited by the Association of Zoos and Aquariums (AZA) and is a member of the World Association of Zoos and Aquariums (WAZA).

== History ==
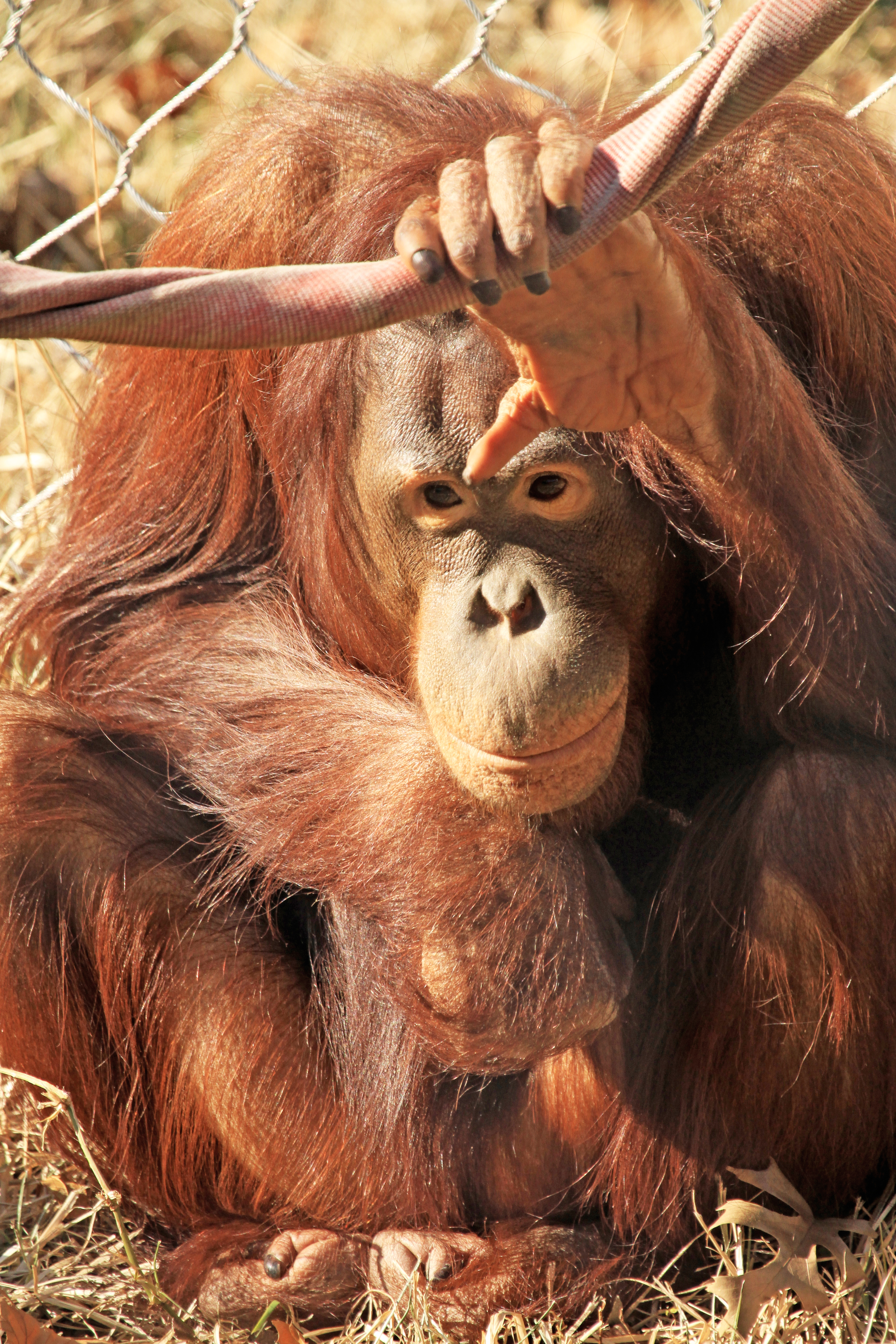
Orangutan at Cameron Park Zoo in Waco, Texas

Cameron Park Zoo was initially established in 1955 as the Central Texas Zoological Park by a group of wildlife enthusiasts who wanted to create an area for recreation and education opportunities.

In 1981, a master plan was established to expand the zoo, and in 1989 a countywide bond was issued to redevelop a 52-acre (210,000 m^{2}) area of Cameron Park, into the Cameron Park Zoo. The project was completed, the old zoo was closed, and the new zoo was opened to the public on July 18, 1993.

The Cameron Park Zoo features species from North and South America, Africa, Asia and Europe. Including a large reptile house, an African lion display, and Lemur Island, a large open lemur habitat. In 2005, a large new area was opened called the Brazos River Country, featuring a 50,000-US-gallon (190,000 L) saltwater reef aquarium, a large swampland habitat, and many other native Texas type habitats, featuring numerous species found within the state. The exhibit is so large, it nearly doubled both the animal population and the overall size of the zoo. In 2009, the zoo added the Asian Forest, expanding its collection to include endangered species such as orangutans and Komodo dragons. These species joined the Sumatran tigers in the Asian Forest.

== Cameron Park ==
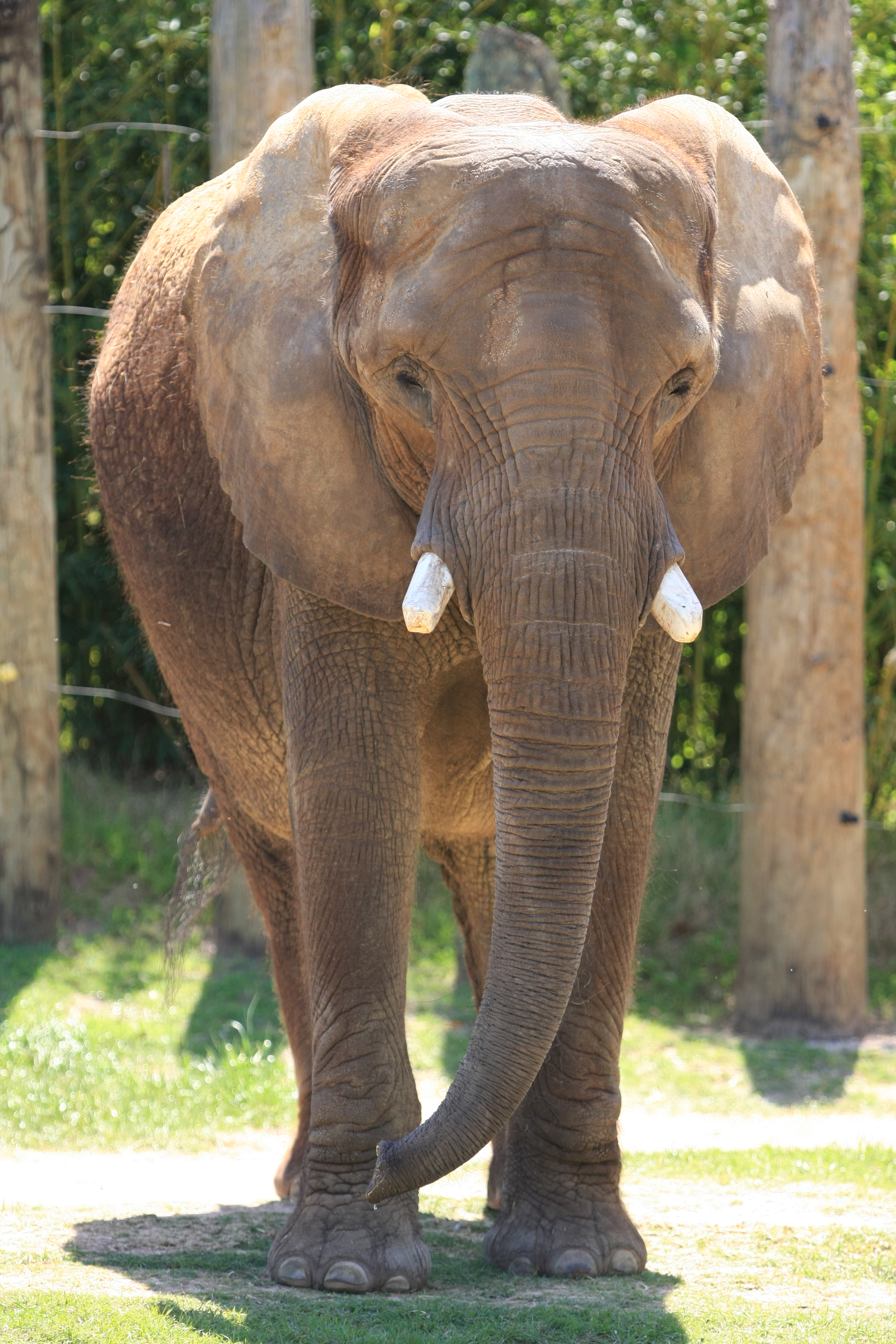
Elephant Tembo in habitat at Cameron Park Zoo in Waco, Texas

Cameron Park Zoo is located with Cameron Park. Cameron Park covers 416 acres (168 ha), and is one of the largest undeveloped municipal parks in Texas. It is located at the intersection of the Bosque River and Brazos River. Situated in Waco's Cameron Park, the zoo enjoys lush native vegetation and adjoins nearby limestone cliffs, which provide an excellent view of Waco.

== Gallery ==
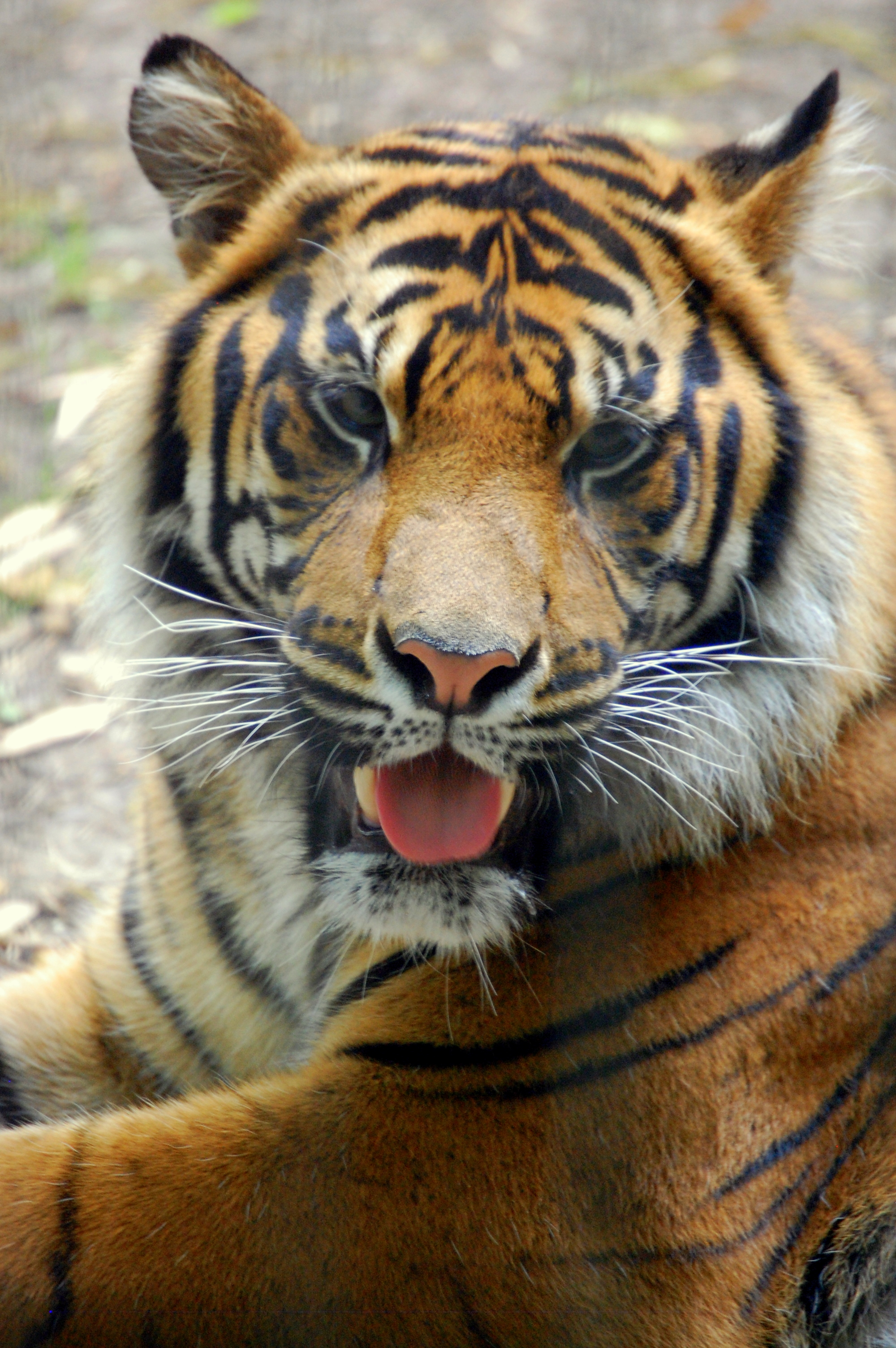
Sumatran tiger featured in the zoo's Asian Forest exhibit

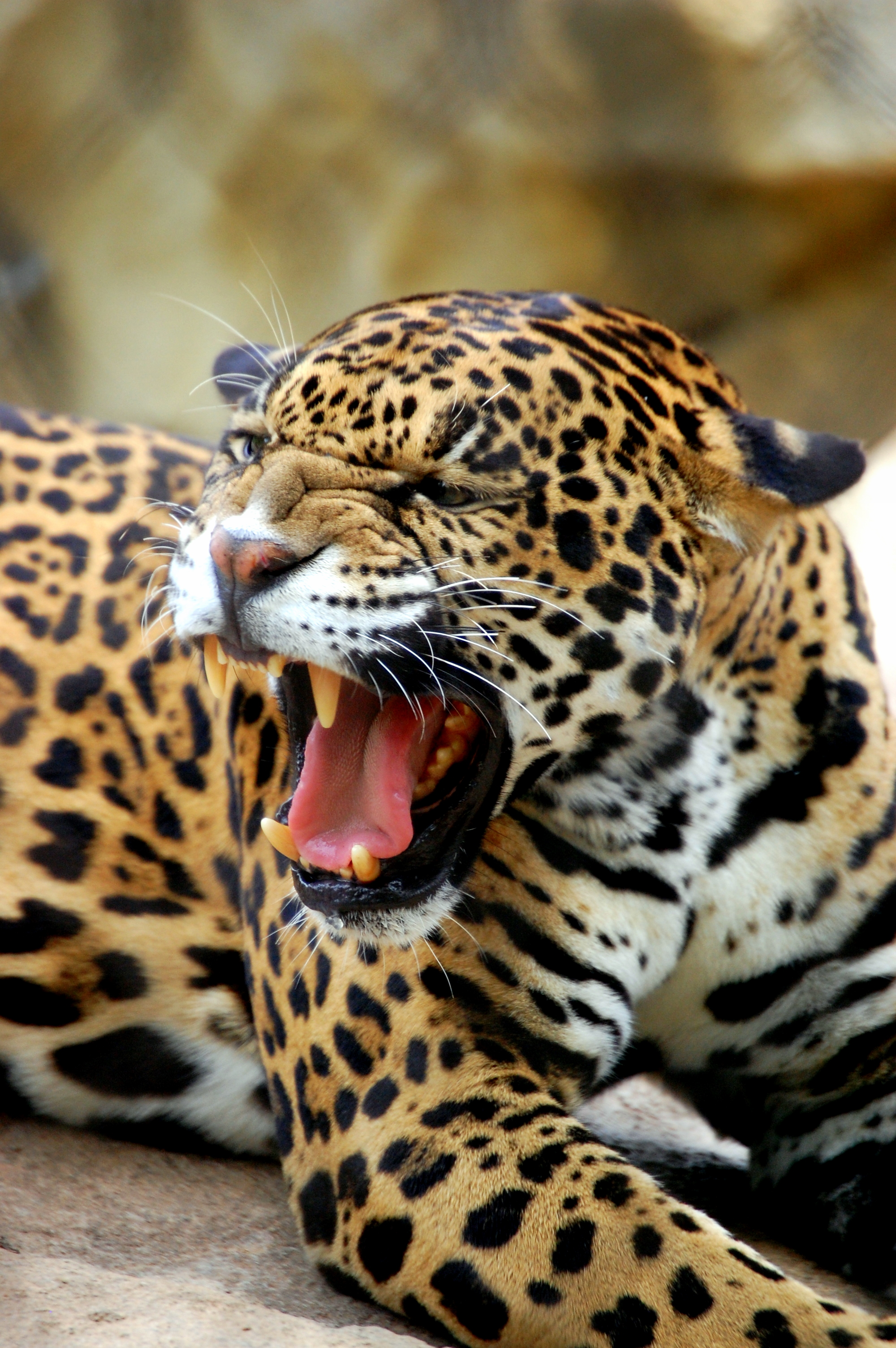
Adult jaguar in Waco, Texas' Cameron Park Zoo

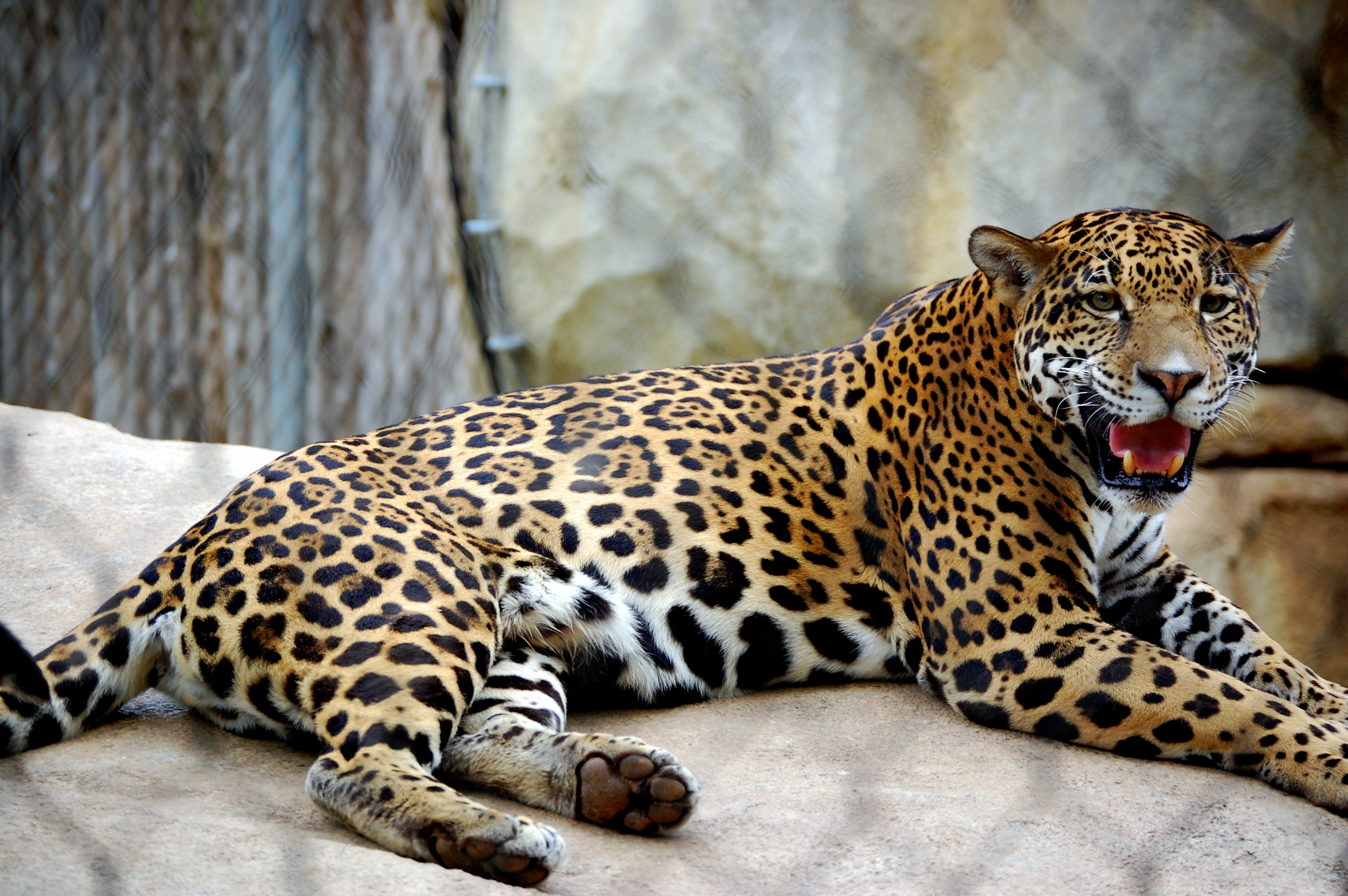
Adult jaguar in Cameron Park Zoo

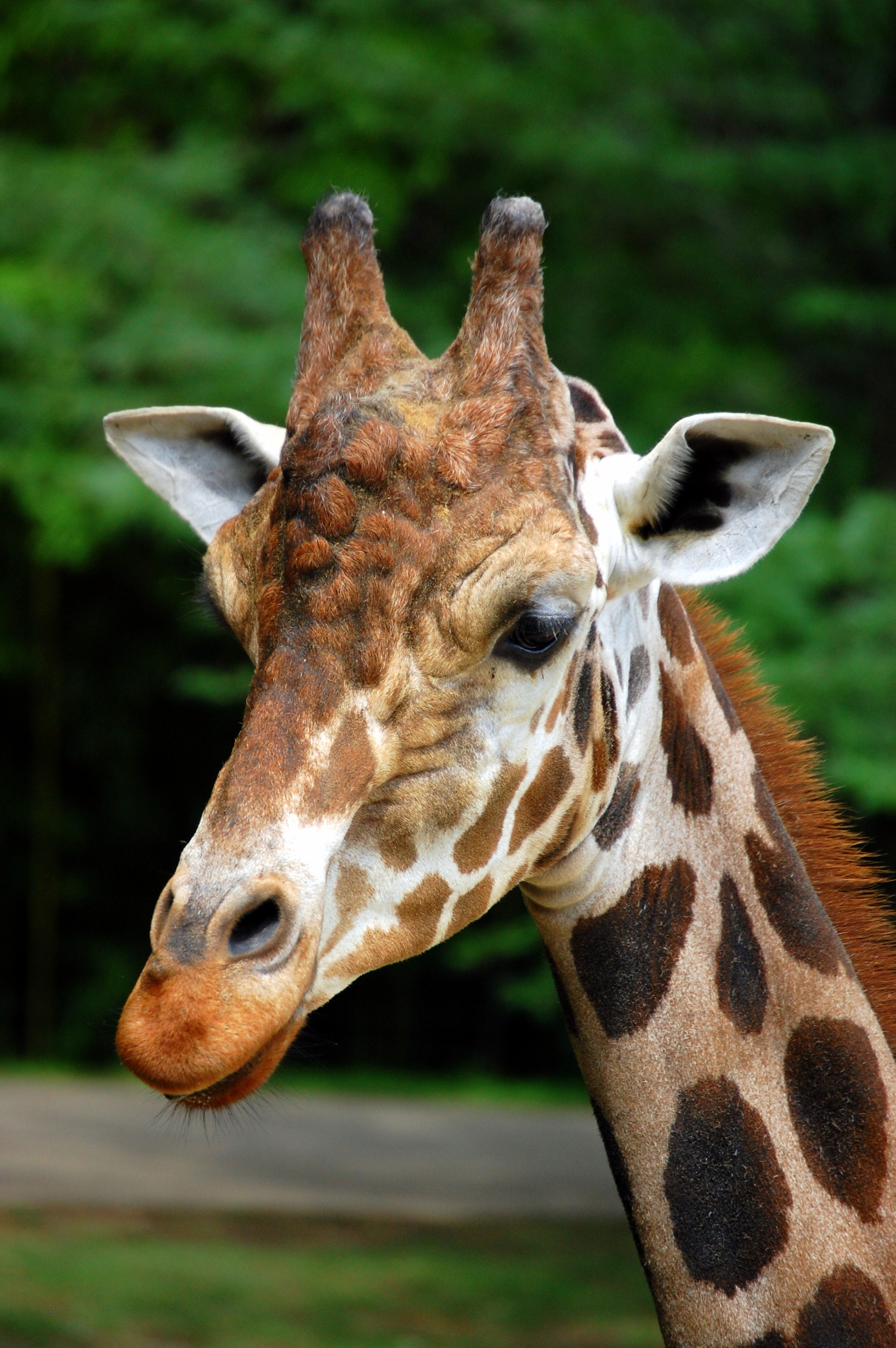
Giraffe featured at Cameron Park Zoo

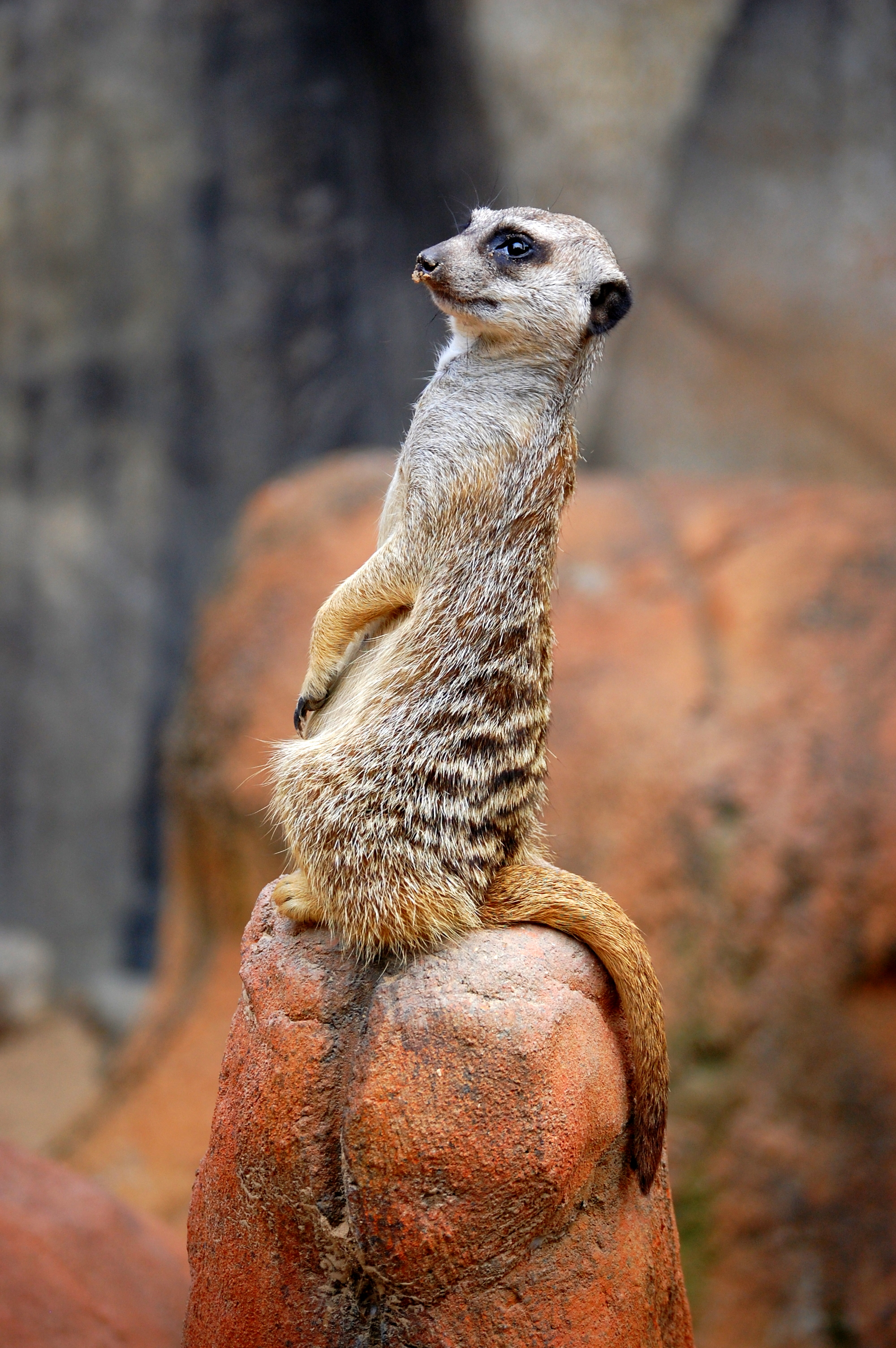
Meerkat featured at Cameron Park Zoo

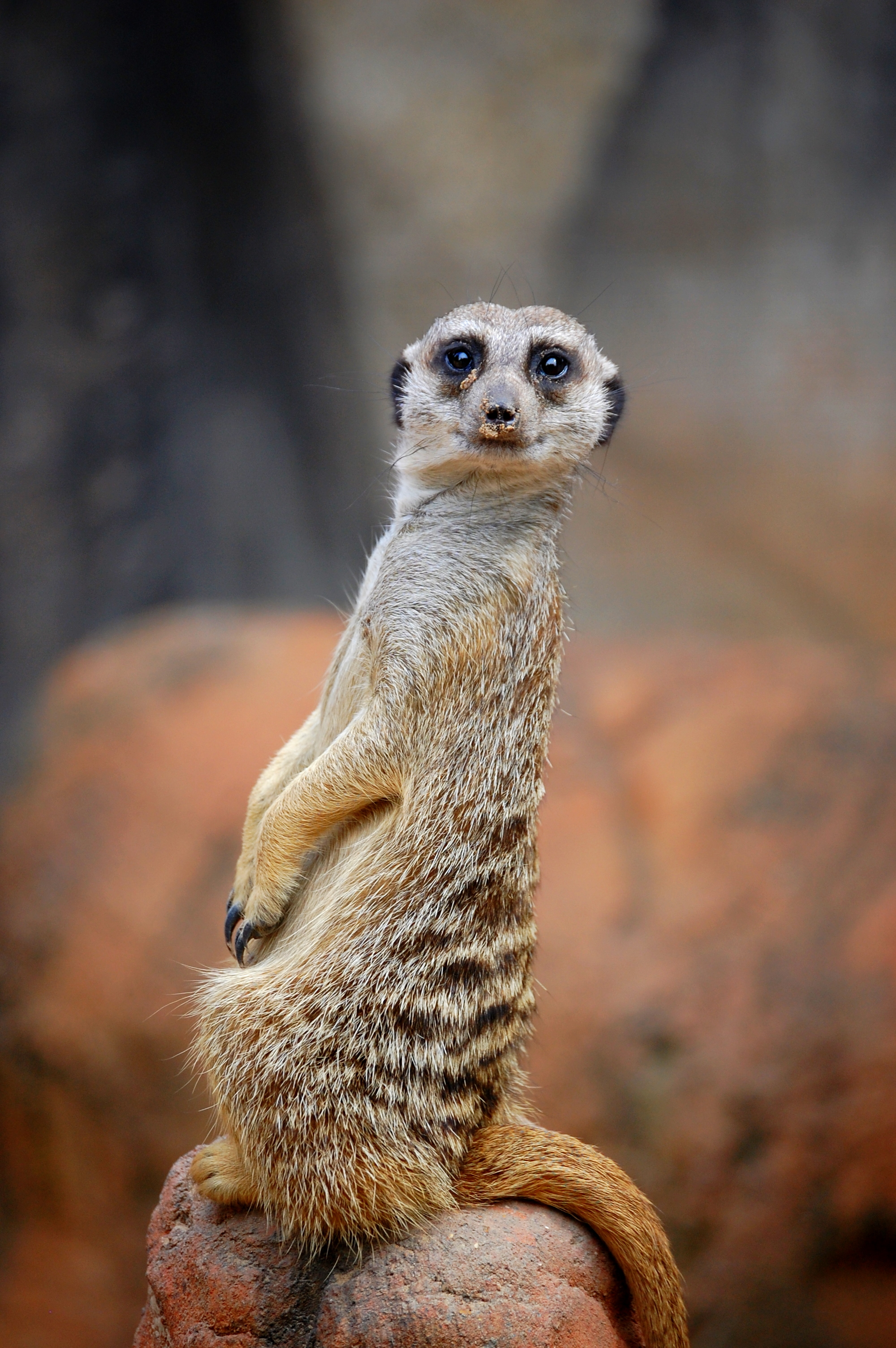
A meerkat at Cameron Park Zoo

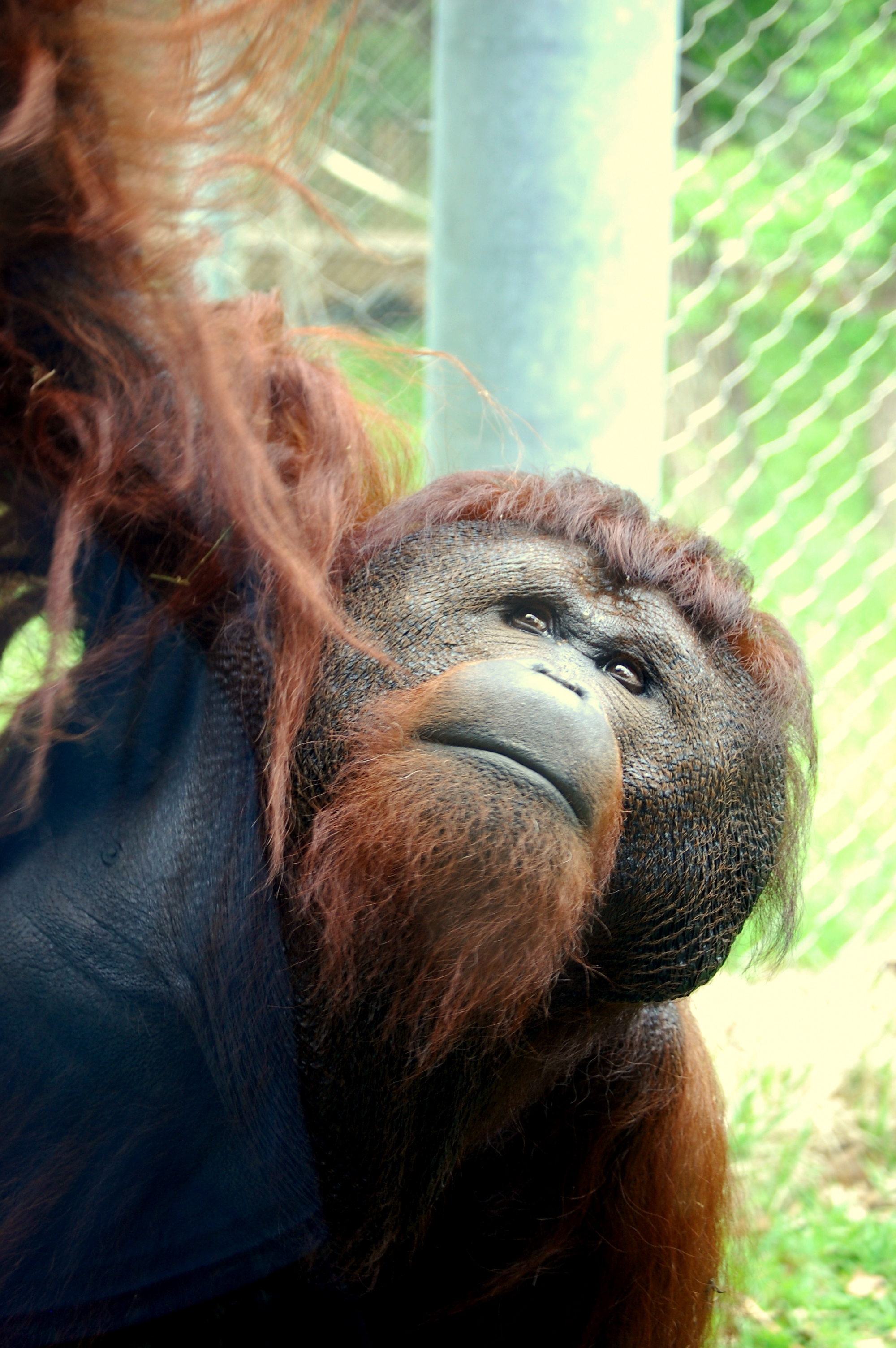
Orangutan featured in Cameron Park Zoo's Asian Forest exhibit

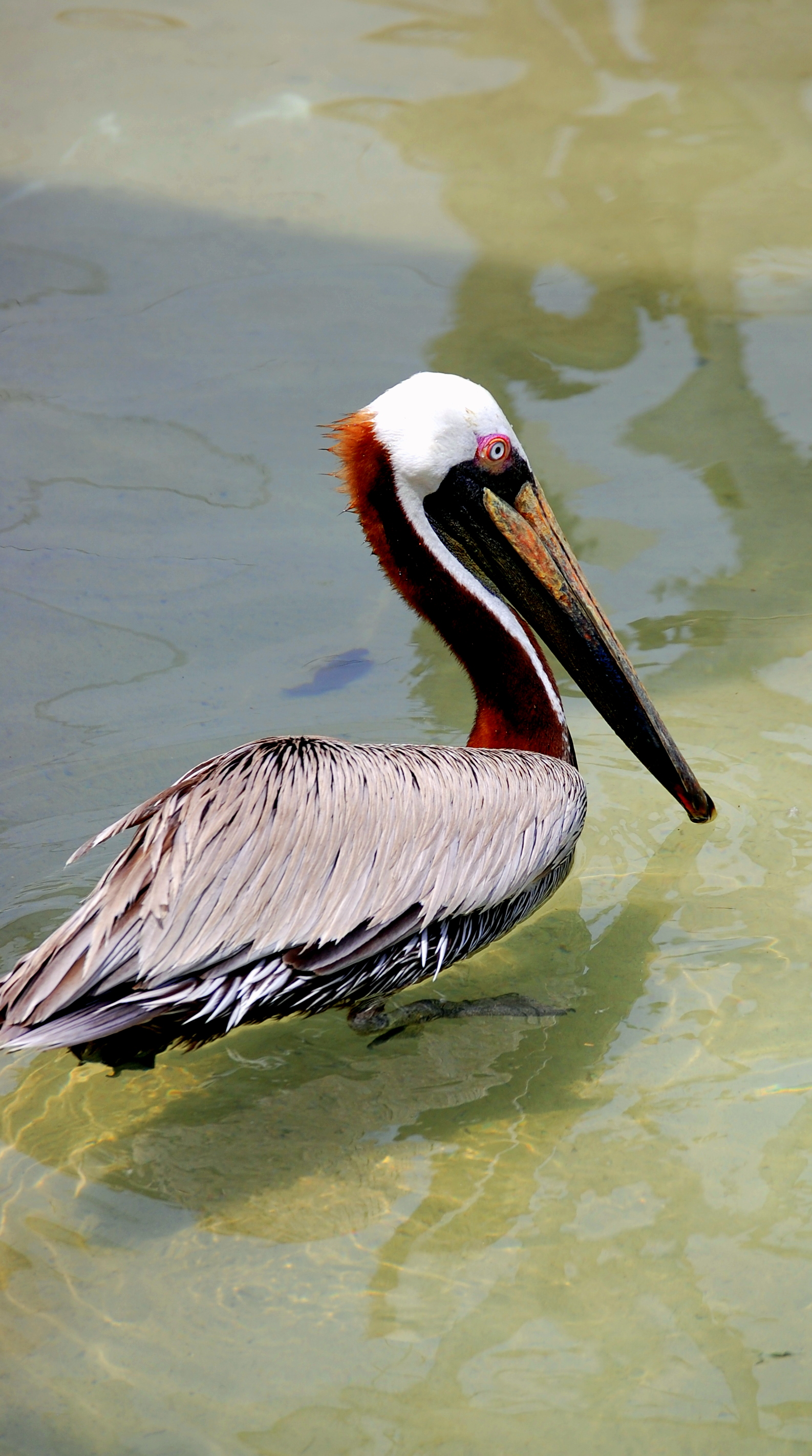
Pelican at Cameron Park Zoo

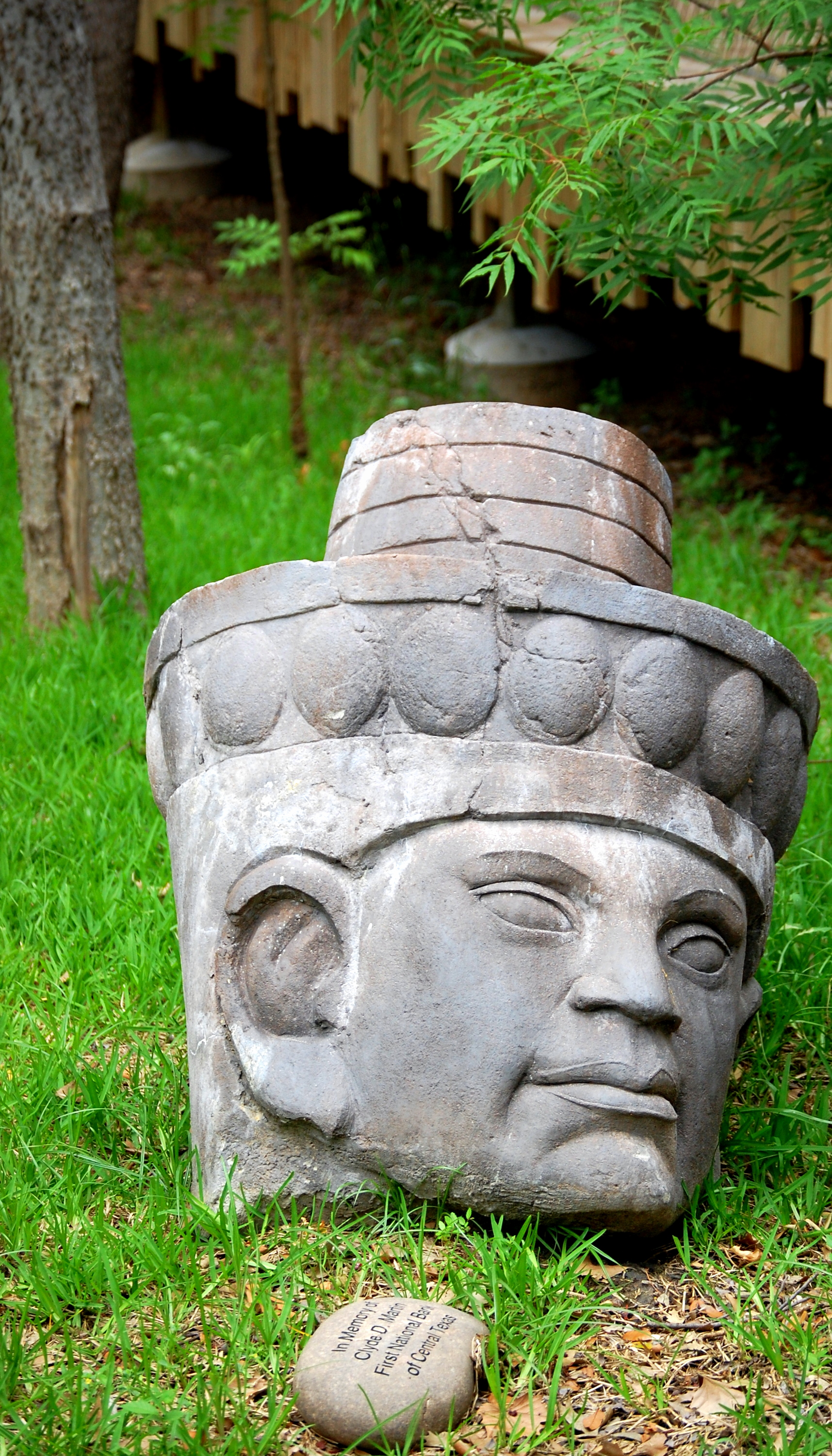
Decor at Asian Forest exhibit in Cameron Park

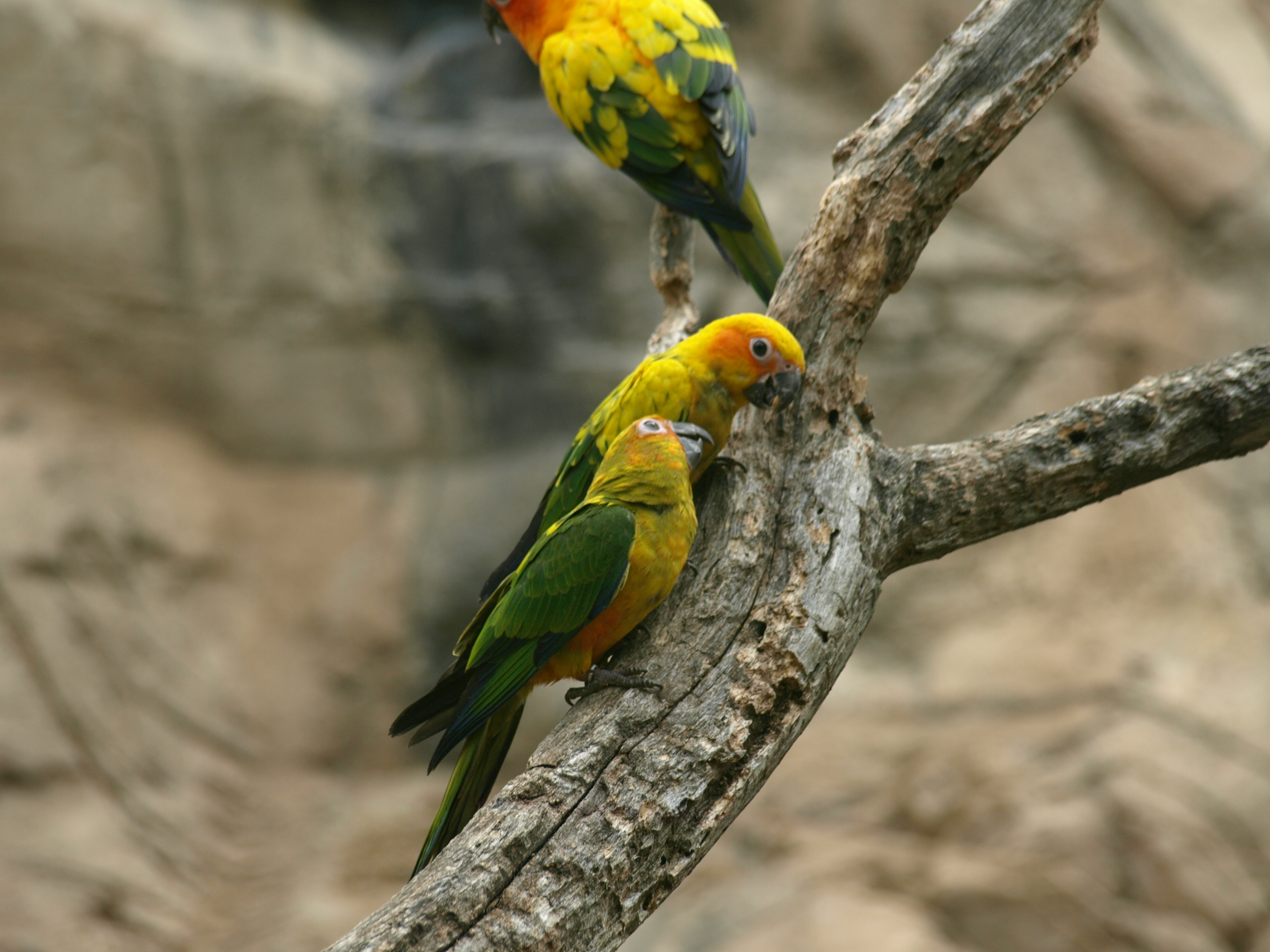
Sun conure at Cameron Park Zoo
