= List of colleges and universities in Lubbock, Texas =

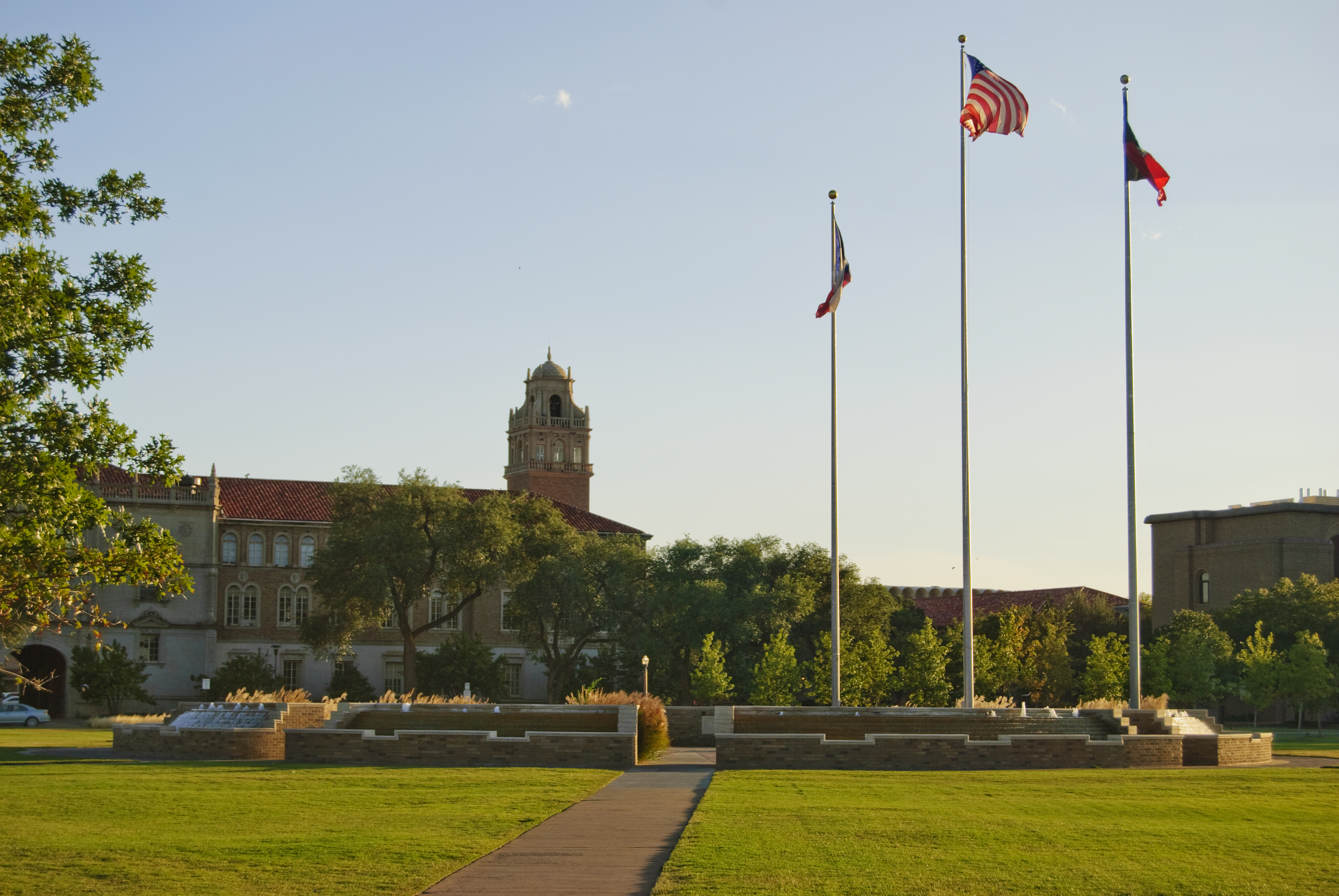
Texas Tech University

The following is a list of colleges and universities with campuses in Lubbock, Texas:

- Covenant School of Nursing (Covenant Health System)
- Covenant School of Radiography (Covenant Health System)
- Kaplan College
- Lubbock Christian University
- South Plains College
- Sunset International Bible Institute
- Texas Tech University
  - College of Agricultural Sciences & Natural Resources
  - College of Architecture
  - College of Arts & Sciences
  - College of Education
  - College of Human Sciences
  - College of Media & Communication
  - Talkington College of Visual & Performing Arts
  - Graduate School
  - Rawls College of Business
  - School of Law
  - School of Music
  - Whitacre College of Engineering
- Texas Tech University Health Sciences Center
  - Anita Thigpen Perry School of Nursing
  - Graduate School of Biomedical Sciences
  - School of Allied Health Sciences
  - School of Medicine
  - School of Pharmacy
- Virginia College
- Wayland Baptist University
- Texas Bible College

South Plains College is the community college, designated under Texas law, for all of Lubbock County.
