= The Daily Toreador =

Texas Tech University student newspaper

- Front page of The Daily Toreador
- Type: Student newspaper
- Format: Broadsheet
- School: Texas Tech University
- Owner: Texas Tech Student Media
- Publisher: Toreador Media
- Editor-in-chief: Jacob Lujan
- Managing editor: Aynsley Larsen
- Founded: October 3, 1925; 100 years ago
- Language: English
- Headquarters: Media & Communication Rotunda, Room 180; Lubbock, Texas 79409
- Country: United States
- Circulation: 10,000 (daily)
- Website: www.dailytoreador.com
- Free online archives: collections2.swco.ttu.edu (1925–); issuu.com/toreador (2010–)

The Daily Toreador, also known as The DT, is the student newspaper of Texas Tech University in Lubbock, Texas. The newspaper was first published in 1925 as The Toreador and later changed its name to The University Daily before arriving at the current name in 2005. All content for The DT is produced by a staff around 40 members including editors, reporters and photographers. The DT has received numerous regional and national awards, including a Columbia Scholastic Press Association Gold crown award, two Columbia Scholastic Press Association Silver crown awards, and two Associated Collegiate Press Pacemaker Award finalists. As well, the paper counts five Pulitzer Prizes and four winners amongst its former staff members.

== History ==
=== 1925-1966: The Toreador ===
On October 3, 1925, two days after classes began at Texas Technological College, the first issue of The Toreador was published. The chosen name of the publication was explained in the first issue relevant to the Spanish Renaissance architecture of the campus buildings and unofficial moniker of the football team:

It is well known, of course, that in the favorite sport of Spain and Old Mexico, the 'toreador' is an assistant to the 'matador,' or bull fighter—an aggravation you might say. So when the name Matador was suggested in keeping with the Spanish architecture and design of the college buildings, nothing seemed more appropriate as a name for the student publication than The Toreador. And we might add that it is our intention to have the name retain its full meaning, for we expect it to be one of the strongest supporters of the Tech Matadors. Therefore when The Toreador announces that the Matadors are ready to 'kill,' you may depend upon it.

— The Toreador Vol. 1, No. 1

In 1929, The Toreador hosted a contest to create a new school song, with a prize 25 dollar prize offered to the winner. The final result was The Matador Song written by the R.C. Marshall, the editor of the 1931 La Ventana.

During World War II, the newspaper format of The Toreador was reduced in size to tabloid format, and publication was reduced from semi-weekly to weekly.

In 1962, the name of newspaper changed to The Daily Toreador reflecting the increased frequency in publication.

=== 1966-2005: The University Daily ===
To represent a change in size format from tabloid to broadsheet, the newspaper debuted its new name The University Daily, on September 20, 1966, three years prior to the name change of Texas Technological College to Texas Tech University.

=== 2005-present: The Daily Toreador ===
To coincide with its 80th anniversary in 2005, the name was reverted to The Daily Toreador. Following the Rawls College of Business move to a new building in 2012, the College of Media & Communication and Student Media relocated to the old Business Administration building.

== Circulation ==
The newspaper prints 10,000 issues on Thursdays during the fall and spring semesters and Tuesdays during summer sessions, and has around 2,000 to 5,000 unique visitors per day to its website, continually making it one of the top-25 read college newspapers in the nation.

== Awards ==
Associated Collegiate Press

- 2003–2004 Newspaper Pacemaker Finalist
- 2011 Online Pacemaker Finalist

Columbia Scholastic Press Association

- 2000–2001 Silver Crown Certificate
- 2003–2004 Silver Crown Certificate
- 2022–2023 Gold Crown Certificate

== Editorial staff ==
Although two advisers watch over the operations of the newspaper, the day-to-day decisions for the newspaper rest on the student staff. The advisers choose not to restrict the content that is placed in the paper, but instead make suggestions and give advice to the editorial board.

=== Current ===
- Sheri Lewis – director
- Jacob Lujan – editor-in-chief
- Aynsley Larsen – managing editor
- Ty Kaplan – sports editor
- Sofia Bueno – news editor
- Christian Jeter – features editor
- Makayla Perez – multimedia editor
- Will Wright – opinions editor
- Jacob Lujan – digital content manager
- Audrey Boissoneault – copy editor
- Jacob Nadolsky – puzzles editor

== Advertising staff ==
=== Current ===
- Dawn Zuerker – sales, marketing, & design manager
- Vacant – student marketing manager

== Professional staff ==
=== Current ===
- Sheri Lewis – director
- Kristi Morse – business manager
- Vacant – administrative assistant

== Notable alumni ==
Name	Class year	Former position	Notability	Refs
Frank Bass	1985		1988 Pulitzer Prize, General News Reporting, Alabama Journal, 1996 Outstanding Alumni Recipient	
Dennis Copeland	1977	Photographer	1985 Pulitzer Prize, Spot News Photography, The Register, 1993 Pulitzer Prize, Public Service Award, The Miami Herald, 1995 Outstanding Alumni Recipient	
Michael J. Crook	1983	News editor	News editor, reporter, 1993 Pulitzer Prize, Public Service Award, The Miami Herald	
Marshall Formby	1932	Editor-in-chief	Texas State Senator, radio station owner, and attorney. 1981 Outstanding Alumni Recipient	
Thomas Jay Harris	1938	Associate editor	News Editor at the Lubbock Avalanche-Journal, and namesake of the Thomas Jay Harris Institute for Hispanic and International Communication, 1983 Outstanding Alumni Recipient.	
Charles E. Maple	1954	Business manager	Journalist, Chamber of Commerce member, State Parks System Administrator	
Jeff Klotzman	1976	Sports editor	KJTV-TV News Director, 2002 Outstanding Alumni Recipient	
Robert Montemayor	1975	Editor-in-chief	1978 George Polk Award, Local Reporting, Dallas Times Herald, 1984 Pulitzer Prize, Public Service Award, Los Angeles Times, 1984 Outstanding Alumni Recipient	
Winston Reeves	1938	Photographer	Lubbock and West Texas photographer whose 60,000 pictures were donated to the Southwest Collections/Special Collections Library in 1996.	
Tod Roberson	1981		2010 Pulitzer Prize, Editorial Writing, Dallas Morning News, 2011 Outstanding Alumni Recipient	
Dirk West	1952	Cartoonist	Creator of Raider Red; elected mayor of Lubbock in 1978.	

== See also ==
- Texas Tech University
- List of college newspapers
- La Ventana
