= Texas Tech University at Fredericksburg =

Coordinates: 30.245855°N 98.842460°W

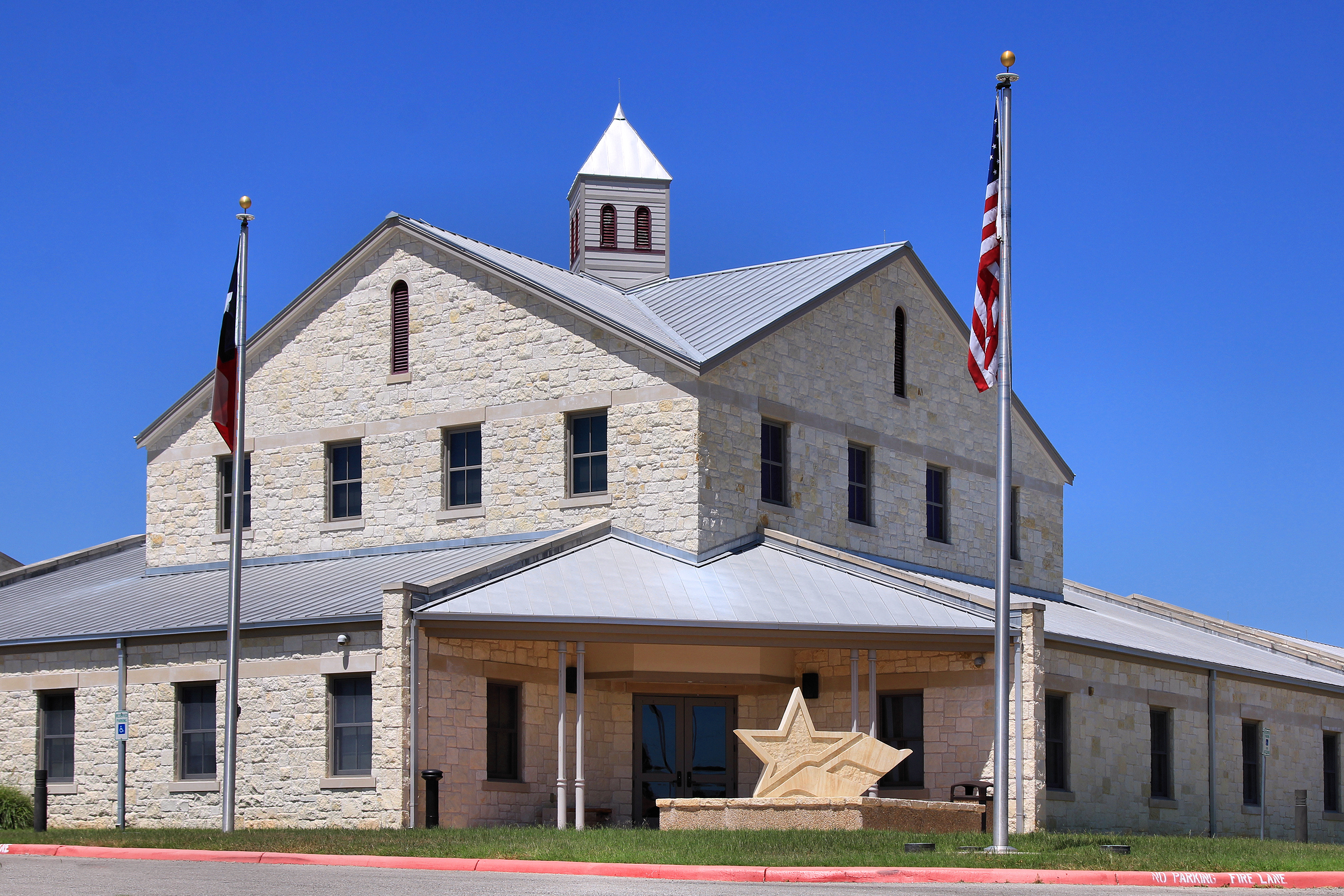
Texas Tech University at Fredericksburg is located in the Hill Country University Center.

Texas Tech University at Fredericksburg is an official off-campus teaching site of Texas Tech University located in Fredericksburg, Texas. The site was established in 2002 to extend Texas Tech's presence by hosting year-round academic programs in the Texas Hill Country.

== Academic programs ==
Texas Tech University at Fredericksburg hosts both graduate and undergraduate degrees through on-site and distance education. Most classes meet simultaneously at TTU at Fredericksburg, TTU at Highland Lakes, and TTU at Junction.

Undergraduate degrees hosted include bachelor of general studies and bachelor of science in nursing (through a partnership with the Texas Tech University Health Sciences Center's School of Nursing). Graduate degrees hosted include education-related programs (master of education in educational leadership providing training in midlevel management and school principal certification), post-baccalaureate teacher certification, master of education in language literacy education, master of education in instructional technology, and master of education in special education) and a master of science degree.
