= The Matador Song =

School song of the Texas Tech Red Raiders

"The Matador Song", which dates from 1930, is the school song of the Texas Tech University Red Raiders.

== History ==
The song was created as part of a contest sponsored by the school newspaper, then known as The Toreador. R.C. Marshall, the editor of the 1931 La Ventana was chosen as the winner and given a $25 prize. In the next year, Goin' Band Director Harry LeMaire rewrote the music to the song. Aside from that, it has remained unchanged since its creation. Despite Texas Tech adopting the Red Raider as its mascot in 1936, the song continues to refer to the original Matador mascot.

== Lyrics ==
Fight, Matadors, for Tech,
Songs of love we’ll sing to thee,
Bear our banners far and wide,
Ever to be our pride,
Fearless champions ever be,
Stand on heights of victory,
Strive for honor evermore,
Long live the Matadors!
