= College of Performing Arts =

College of Performing Arts may refer to:

== Chicago ==
- Chicago College of Performing Arts, Roosevelt University in Chicago, Illinois
- The Music Conservatory of Chicago College of Performing Arts
- The Theatre Conservatory of Chicago College of Performing Arts, Roosevelt University in Chicago, Illinois

== Elsewhere ==
- National Taiwan College of Performing Arts, Neihu, Taipei, Taiwan
- The New School College of Performing Arts, New York
- Stella Mann College of Performing Arts, Bedford, Bedfordshire, England
- Talkington College of Visual & Performing Arts, Texas Tech University in Lubbock, Texas
