= Kim Walker (bassoonist) =

Kim Walker is an American bassoonist.

== Career ==
After 10 years at Indiana University, Walker became Dean of Music at Sydney Conservatorium of Music in 2004. Walker's career as a bassoonist is well documented with a catalogue of well over 23 solo recordings available. She continues to perform worldwide.

On 24 May 2018 Walker was named the new director of the Texas Tech University School of Music and assumed the role on 1 July, replacing interim director Keith Dye. She resigned the role on 8 July 2020 and was replaced by Robin Germany.
