= Texas Tech University at Highland Lakes =

Coordinates: 30.557466°N 98.273778°W

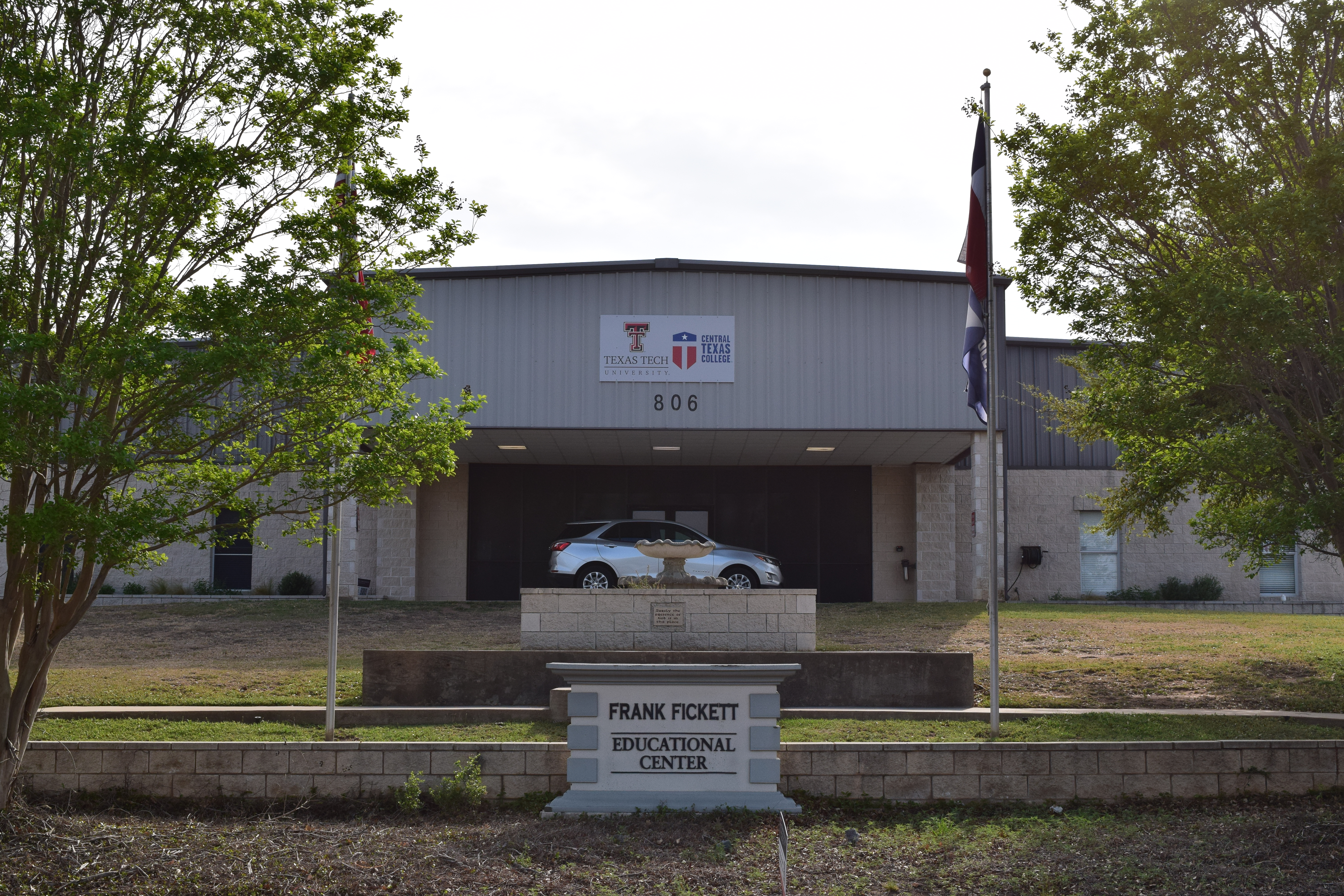

Texas Tech University at Highland Lakes is an official off campus teaching site of Texas Tech University located at the Frank Fickett Educational Center in Marble Falls, Texas, sharing the space with a similar site for Central Texas College. The site was established in 2002 to extend Texas Tech's presence in the Texas Hill Country by hosting year-round academic programs.

== Academic programs ==
Texas Tech University at Highland Lakes hosts both graduate and undergraduate degrees through on-site and distance education. Most classes meet simultaneously at TTU at Highland Lakes, TTU at Fredericksburg, and TTU at Junction.

Undergraduate degrees hosted include Bachelor of General Studies and Bachelor of Science in Nursing (through a partnership with the Texas Tech University Health Sciences Center's School of Nursing). Graduate degrees hosted include education-related programs—Master of Education in Educational Leadership (providing training in mid-level management and school principal certification), post-baccalaureate teacher certification, Master of Education in Language Literacy Education, Master of Education in Instructional Technology, and Master of Education in Special Education—and a Master of Science degree.

As of 2007, Texas Tech University at Highland Lakes occupied a 10,000-square-foot (930 m^{2}) building. The city is funding an expansion that will double the size of the facility.
