= Texas Tech University Center at Junction =

Official off-campus teaching site of Texas Tech University in Junction, Texas, US

Coordinates: 30.471466°N 99.781469°W

Texas Tech University Center at Junction is an official off-campus teaching site of Texas Tech University in Junction, Texas. It hosts undergraduate and graduate courses in an intensive three-week period format from May through July. Additionally, an intersession is held in May; this allows students to earn up to three hours of credit between the spring and summer sessions. These courses are taught by Texas Tech University faculty members who either travel to Junction or teach via videoconferencing.

== History ==
The land where the campus is located was given by members of the Jetton Family Estate and Kimble County, Texas, to the State of Texas to establish an institution of higher education. In 1951, Texas A&M University opened an adjunct campus at Junction, and for several years, the site was used as a college preparatory and research center. In 1971, the campus was given to Texas Tech University by the Texas Legislature. Since then, Texas Tech has offered intensive academic courses between May and August at the center. Traditionally, the majority of courses have related to field science and art, but many other courses have been taught.

Since 2000, year-round academic programs for the Texas Hill Country have been offered by Texas Tech, using the Center at Junction as a base of operations. University and community-college partnerships were established, and local academic teaching sites were founded in donated or leased space in the Fredericksburg and Marble Falls. These teaching sites host year-round academic programs, with videoconferencing courses often meeting simultaneously at the three sites.

=== The Junction Boys ===
While Texas A&M owned and operated the Junction campus, the site was used for summer training of the Aggie football team under coach Paul "Bear" Bryant. The Junction campus is still known to the Aggies and to college football fans in general as the site of the famous 1954 10-day camp that produced the so-called "Junction Boys", including the core of their 1956 undefeated team. Over 100 players began the camp, but only 27 to 35 finished it having survived blistering heat and highly demanding training with no water breaks.

The camp was subsequently commemorated in a novel by Jim Dent and a film by ESPN starring Tom Berenger as Bryant. Among the Junction Boys were College Football Hall of Fame coach Jack Pardee and Gene "Bebes" Stallings, who went on both to coach the Aggies and then to coach Alabama to its first national championship since Bryant's retirement and death.

== Academic programs ==
Texas Tech University Center at Junction hosts both graduate and undergraduate degrees through on-site and distance education. Most classes meet simultaneously at TTU Center at Junction, TTU at Fredericksburg, and TTU at Highland Lakes.

Undergraduate degrees hosted include Bachelor of General Studies and Bachelor of Science in nursing (through a partnership with the Texas Tech University Health Sciences Center's School of Nursing). Graduate degrees hosted include education-related programs (Master of Education in Educational Leadership (providing training in mid-level management and school principal certification), postbaccalaureate teacher certification, Master of Education in Language Literacy Education, Master of Education in Instructional Technology, and Master of Education in Special Education) and a Master of Science degree.

Additionally, a Master of Art Education is available at the Texas Tech University Center at Junction.

== Academic partners ==
In addition to its obvious partnership with Texas Tech University, Texas Tech University Center at Junction also has partner academic programs with Austin Community College, Central Texas College, and Howard College.

== Facility usage ==
Aside from regular academic credit courses, TTU Center at Junction is used for special activities such as workshops and retreats. The campus is available for use by student organizations, faculty groups, and researchers from Texas Tech and other institutions, including state and federal agencies.

Annually, the center sponsors an international kite retreat and a spring retreat for Art Educators.

=== Red Raider Camp ===
In the summer of 2001, Texas Tech began offering Red Raider Camp at the Junction campus. Red Raider Camp is a three-day and two-night event intended to prepare incoming Texas Tech students for college life. The camp includes lessons in Texas Tech history and traditions.

=== Field Research Station ===
The Field Research Station at the Texas Tech University Center at Junction was established in June 2002. It was designed to provide laboratory and classroom environments for undergraduate and graduate students from universities, institutes, and public schools. It focuses on plant and animal biology research.

=== Outdoor School ===
The Texas Tech University Center at Junction offers an outdoor school program for K-12 students that focuses on preparation for the Texas Essential Knowledge and Skills (TEKS) examination.

Texas A&M Forest service Texas forest service uses this location for part of its 12-week training academy, it is used in 2 week sessions
