= Vietnam Center and Sam Johnson Vietnam Archive =

- Established: 1989; 37 years ago
- Founders: James Reckner
- Location: Texas Tech University, Lubbock, Texas, 79409, United States; 33.5819°N 101.8773°W
- Website: Official website

The Vietnam Center and Sam Johnson Vietnam Archive collects and preserves the documentary record of the Vietnam War. The Vietnam Center and Archive, part of Texas Tech University, is the nation's largest and most comprehensive collection of information on the Vietnam War. On August 17, 2007, the Texas Tech Vietnam Center became the first U.S. institution to sign a formalized exchange agreement with the State Records and Archives Department of Vietnam. This opens the door for a two-way exchange between the entities.

The Vietnam Center's mission is to support and encourage research and education regarding all aspects of the American Vietnam experience; promoting a greater understanding of this experience and the peoples and cultures of Southeast Asia. It promotes education through exhibits, classroom instruction, and publications; support for the archive and the collection and preservation of pertinent historical source material; and encouragement of related scholarship through organizing and hosting conferences and symposia each year.

== History ==
Three Swift Boats n Cam Ranh Bay, Vietnam. Corrado Rudolfo Lutz Collection (va025931)

In 1989, a group of Vietnam veterans from West Texas gathered at Texas Tech University to discuss what they might do, in a positive way, about their experiences in Vietnam. Their meeting was spearheaded by James Reckner, a Texas Tech military history professor and Navy veteran of the Vietnam War, who had become concerned with his students’ lack of knowledge about the war. This was mostly because many citizens after the war pretended it did not happen. The group's immediate decision was to form a Vietnam Archive and begin collecting and preserving materials relating to the American Vietnam experience.

On December 2, 1989, the Texas Tech University Board of Regents approved the creation of the Center for the Study of the Vietnam Conflict. Its dual missions are to fund and guide the development of the Vietnam Archive and encourage continuing study of all aspects of the American Vietnam experience. The U.S. government has used the archive’s online search engine to find documents relating to prisoners-of-war during their time in Vietnam.

In 2001, the Vietnam Archives established the Vietnam Virtual Archive with the aim of putting many documents online to facilitate free and easy access through the Internet. According to Steve Maxner – director of the Vietnam Center and Archives said in a 2011 interview that the Center is able to operate thanks to the support of Vietnam veterans and how their material contributions and oral histories serve informational and educational purposes. Also during this time, Director of the Texas Tech Vietnam Center and Archives Stephen Maxner was awarded the "For the Cause of Vietnamese Archives" by the Vietnamese Government for his contributions to archival cooperation between Vietnam and the United States. In 2012, the National Historical Publications and Records Commission awarded the center $144,000 to fund student work that will digitize the 250,000-page collection of the Association of Families of Vietnamese Political Prisoners. The collection documents the migration of thousands of Vietnamese Americans after the end of the Vietnam War.

In 2017, the facility was renamed the "Vietnam Center and Sam Johnson Vietnam Archive" in honor of U.S. Rep. Sam Johnson, a former prisoner of war. He has helped Texas Tech University secure federal funding to support the Vietnam Center and Archive. By August 2019, thanks to a $95,740 grant from the National Endowment for the Humanities, the Center had edited, transcribed, and published online the entire remaining collection of oral history interviews produced by the VNCA Oral History Project. Also this year, the archives center is scheduled to expand and be housed in an entirely new facility, a project that requires $25 million for the building itself and a $10 million grant to cover operating costs.

In 2023, the Heart of Vietnamese Soldiers organization coordinated with the center to run a non-profit project called "Vietnam War Legacy Files." The Vietnam Archive returned a collection of five diaries and 30 letters written by Vietnamese soldiers, most of whom died in the Vietnam War. The second return of the soldier's diaries, letters, and personal items was in July 2024.

== Special projects ==
=== Virtual Vietnam Archive ===
Jennifer Young Collection (va043454)

In March 2002, the Virtual Vietnam Archive was launched with a five hundred thousand dollar federal grant to digitize the Vietnam Archive's collection of documents, audio, and images. Types of material include documents, photographs, slides, negatives, oral histories, artifacts, moving images, sound recordings, maps, and collection finding aids. All non-copyrighted and digitized materials are available for users to download free of charge. By 2004, it was announced that the Virtual Vietnam Archives project would receive $1.8 million in funding over four years from the federal government's Institute of Museum and Library Services.

=== Oral History Project ===
The Oral History Project of the Vietnam Archive was created in 1999. The mission of the OHP is to create and preserve a more complete record of the wars in Southeast Asia by preserving, through recorded interviews, the recollections and experiences of all who were involved in those wars. Anyone can participate, whether an American veteran, a former ally or enemy of the U.S., an anti-war protester, a government employee, a family member of a veteran, etc.

=== Vietnamese American Heritage Project ===
The Vietnamese American Heritage Project (VAHP), created in 2008, supports the Vietnam Archive’s mission to document the war from all perspectives by providing documentation of the post-war social and political history of Vietnamese Americans who immigrated to the United States during and after the Vietnam War. The VAHP aims to enhance the study of the Vietnamese immigration and resettlement experience by providing reference services to researchers and increasing Vietnamese American participation in the archive’s Oral History Project, conducting outreach activities, and developing cooperative relationships with other institutions dedicated to preserving Vietnamese American’s rich heritage. The cornerstone of the VAHP is the Vietnam Archives’ Families of Vietnamese Political Prisoners Association (FVPPA) Collection. During the 1980s and 1990s, the FVPPA successfully helped over 10,000 former Vietnamese reeducation camp detainees and their families immigrate to the US and other countries through the United Nations High Commissioner for Refugee’s (UNHCR) Orderly Departure Program (ODP).
