= Rawls College of Business =

Business school of Texas Tech University

- Former names: Division of Commerce (1942–1956); College of Business Administration (1956–2000)
- Type: Public business school
- Established: 1942
- Parent institution: Texas Tech University
- Dean: Margaret L. Williams
- Academic staff: 121
- Students: 5,132
- Undergraduates: 4,466
- Postgraduates: 805
- Location: Lubbock, Texas, U.S. 33.587846°N 101.879256°W
- Campus: Urban
- Website: rawlsbusiness.ba.ttu.edu

The Rawls College of Business (Jerry S. Rawls College of Business Administration, commonly referred to as Rawls Business) is the business school of Texas Tech University in Lubbock, Texas. Rawls Business offers curriculum for both undergraduate and graduate students (including doctoral) and received its initial business accreditation in 1958 from the Association to Advance Collegiate Schools of Business (AACSB). Established in 1942, Texas Tech's business school was originally known as the Division of Commerce. In 1956, the school was renamed the College of Business Administration. Following a $25 million gift from alumnus Jerry S. Rawls in 2000, the school was renamed as Jerry S. Rawls College of Business Administration.

The college is organized into five departments, called areas, and a separately accredited professional accounting school. Rawls Business also offers dual degrees in conjunction with architecture, agriculture, foreign language, law, medicine, pharmacy, and environmental toxicology. The MD/MBA in Health Organization Management (HOM) allows medical students the opportunity to obtain both an MD and MBA degree over four years and is ranked in 2009 by Business Week as 19th among such programs. The International Business program helps Rawls Business students study abroad. In addition, the Executive Education Department develops seminars, conferences, and training programs for professionals and managers in business, government, and industry.

== History ==
Business classes were first offered at Texas Tech in 1927, only two years after the university began holding classes in 1925.

Established in 1942, Texas Tech's business school was initially known as the Division of Commerce. In 1956, the school was renamed the College of Business Administration. In 2000, the school was formally renamed as the Jerry S. Rawls College of Business Administration, following a $25 million (equivalent to $46.74 million in 2025) gift from alumnus Jerry S. Rawls.

The new Rawls Business building opened in 2012. The building was constructed on the site of the former Thompson/Gaston Hall. The Leadership in Energy and Environmental Design (LEED) Gold certified building reused materials from the demolished structure.

In 2013, the Area of Accounting became the School of Accounting, the first separately accredited accounting school in the state. In 2023, Terry and Susan Lyons, loyal supporters of Texas Tech University, made a significant gift to the School of Accounting in the Jerry S. Rawls College of Business. To honor their generosity, the school will be renamed the Terry Lyons School of Accounting.

== Academic profile ==
=== Organization ===
Rawls Business is organized by field into six departments: five areas and one professional school:

- Area of Energy, Economics, and Law
- Area of Finance
- Area of Information Systems and Quantitative Sciences (ISQS)
- Area of Management
- Area of Marketing
- School of Accounting

In 2013, the Area of Accounting became an independent professional school within Rawls Business. The School of Accounting is one of only about 40 stand–alone accounting schools in the United States, and the first accounting school in Texas to be separately accredited by the AACSB. Prior to completing a Bachelor's degree in accounting, students at Austin College in Sherman, Texas are eligible to enroll in graduate–level courses towards the completion of the Master of Science in Accounting (MSA) degree from the School of Accounting through an integrated program.

=== Health Organization Management ===
The Health Organization Management (HOM) program is part of the Texas Tech University Rawls College of Business. The program teaches students about the business side of health care. It awards a degree in Master of Business Administration in Health Organization Management, or MBA(HOM). The program conducts and reports research relevant to health care in the United States and recently Canada and provides services related to healthcare organizations. The Texas Tech MBA(HOM) program is credentialed under the Association of University Programs in Health Administration (AUPHA) and Commission on the Accreditation of Healthcare Management Education (CAHME) accreditation programs.

=== Rankings ===
Business school rankings

U.S. MBA Rankings
- Bloomberg (2025): NR
- U.S. News & World Report (2025): 87

In 2014, Business Week ranked the Rawls Business undergraduate program 83rd among United States business schools. In the 2017 U.S. News & World Report Best Undergraduate Business Programs, Rawls Business was ranked 94th, and the 2015 rankings the MBA program was ranked 87th.

== Facility ==
Rawls Business is located on the Lubbock campus of Texas Tech University, which is situated in the rural, South Plains region of West Texas. The campus of Rawls Business sits on the northwest gateway of the Texas Tech campus, near the 9th Street bridge over the Marsha Sharp Freeway and across from the Texas Tech University Health Sciences Center campus and University Medical Center. Prior to the current building, Rawls Business occupied the now College of Media & Communication, and the former English-Philosophy building. Rawls Business began occupying their current building in 2012, and completed an addition in 2016.

The new 140,000-square-foot (13,000 m^{2}) building includes classrooms, breakout rooms, student lounges, study areas, food service, and a career management center. The building is a LEED-certified facility, incorporating the latest green technology into all offices and classrooms. The $70 million capital campaign for the project was co-chaired by Alan White, chairman and CEO of Plains Capital Corporation, and Jack Hightower, chairman and CEO of Celero Energy. The new building is located on the north end of campus at the previous site of Thompson and Gaston Halls. The building was originally planned to be constructed south of the Merket Alumni Center, but was relocated after complaints from the Texas Tech Alumni Association. Other sites considered included the southwest corner of University and Broadway, where Weeks Hall is located. The building is constructed in Spanish Renaissance theme and creates a north campus gateway. The process of clearing the site began with a ceremony on September 20, 2008. Ground-breaking for the new building took place in September 2009, and the building opened for class in the Spring of 2012.

The Rawls Business Building grounds feature three sculptures, including two from the percent for art program used to fund public art on campuses of Texas Tech University System member universities. The installation art located in the eastern courtyard, We are in the Business of Changing the World by Joe Barrington and Tara Conley, was commissioned to coincide with the opening of the building; the sculpture features a bronze bear and stainless steel bull on either side of an illuminated archway of two sets of stainless steel pipes with identical bases that tendril either upwards or downwards at their ends relating to their adjacent market trend-inspired statues. A second installation was commissioned as part of the 2016 building addition; Illuminated Arboreal Data Codes by Koryn Rolstad, is a group of 13 tree-like forms depicting graphic elements of telecommunication circuits with four concrete bands extending from the watershed base, each engraved with a different text language: cuneiform, morse code, braille, and binary. Located inside the western courtyard, CEO by Glenna Goodacre is a 6-foot, 4-inch bronze statue of a young businesswoman that her daughter Jill Goodacre Connick modeled for in 1985; after a previous attempt to purchase the statue when the building initially opened, it was gifted by Goodacre to the college prior to her retirement in 2016.

Construction on the previous Rawls Business building broke ground in 1966 and opened in 1968. It has 200,000 square feet (19,000 m^{2}), 176 offices, and 36 classrooms spread across 13 floors, including a basement. The 208-foot (63 m) building is the third-tallest in Lubbock, and the tallest on the Texas Tech University campus.

== Student life ==
=== Notable organizations ===
Beta Gamma Sigma Key

- Accounting Leadership Council ALC (Accounting Association)
- Alpha Kappa Psi ΑΚΨ (Coed Professional Business Fraternity)
- Beta Gamma Sigma ΒΓΣ (International Business Honor Society)
- Delta Sigma Pi ΔΣΠ (Coed Business Fraternity)
- Rawls Graduate Association
- Energy Commerce Association
- Tech Marketing Association
- Association of Information Technology Professionals
- Health Organization Management Student Association
- Finance Association
- Real Estate Organization
- Women In Business

== Notable people ==
=== Alumni ===
Since its founding in 1942, Rawls College of Business community has 45,553 alumni.

Name	Class year	Notability	References
Angela Braly	1982	Anthem Inc. President and CEO (2007–2012)	
Dustin Burrows	2004	Texas House Representative, District 83 (2015–present)	
Samuel Ray Cummings	1967	United States District Court for the Northern District of Texas Senior Federal Judge (1987–present)	
Kent Hance	1965	Texas State Senator (1975–1979); U.S. House Representative (1979–1985); Texas Tech University System Chancellor (2006–2014)	
Kliff Kingsbury	2001	Texas Tech Red Raiders football head coach (2013–2018)	
Randy Neugebauer	1972	United States House Representative, Texas District 19 (2003–present)	
Charles Perry	1984	Texas House Representative, District 83 (2011–2014); Texas State Senator, District 28 (2014–present)	
Dan Pope	1985	Lubbock, Texas Mayor (2016–present)	
R. Duane Ireland	1977	Mays Business School Interim Dean (2021–present)	

=== Deans ===
- John Orval Ellsworth (1942–1946)
- Trent Campbell Root (1945–1959)
- Haskell Grant Taylor (acting, 1948–1966)
- George Gail Heather (1950–1968)
- Reginald Rushing (interim 1968–1970)
- Jack Donald Steele (1970–1975)
- Carl H. Stem (1975–1998)
- Roy D. Howell (interim 1998, 1999–2001)
- R. Stephen Sears (interim 2001–2002)
- Allen T. McInnes (2002–2012)
- Lance Nail (2012–2015)
- Paul Goebel (interim 2015–2017)
- Margaret L. Williams (2017–present)

=== Faculty ===
After many years of planning under longtime Dean Carl Herbert Stem, Allen T. McInnes became Dean of Rawls Business in September 2001. McInnes, the former president and CEO of TETRA Technologies, earned a bachelor's degree, MBA, and doctorate at the University of Texas at Austin and a master's degree at Harvard University.

== See also ==
- List of United States business school rankings
- List of business schools in Texas
- List of business schools in the United States
