= Texas Tech University School of Music =

Music school in Lubbock, Texas

- Former name: Department of Music
- Type: Music school
- Parent institution: Texas Tech University
- Accreditation: National Association of Schools of Music
- Director: Andrew J. Stetson
- Faculty: 63.2 (Full-time equivalent)
- Administrative staff: 12
- Students: 487
- Undergraduates: 333
- Postgraduates: 154
- Location: 2624 18th Street, Lubbock, Texas, 79409, U.S. 33.580925°N 101.874491°W
- Website: www.depts.ttu.edu/music

Texas Tech University School of Music is the music school at Texas Tech University in Lubbock, Texas. Previously a department of the College of Arts & Sciences, the School of Music has been within the Talkington College of Visual & Performing Arts since the college's founding in 2004.

== Degrees and Certificates ==
=== Undergraduate Degrees ===
Bachelor of Applied Arts in Commercial Music - B.A.A. (partnership between Texas Tech University (TTU) and South Plains College (SPC) Creative Arts Department)

==== Bachelor of Arts ====
- Bachelor of Arts
- Bachelor of Arts - Concentration in Mariachi
- Bachelor of Arts - Concentration in Commercial Music
- Bachelor of Arts - Concentration in Keyboard

==== Bachelor of Music ====
- Music Education
- Music Composition
- Music Theory
- Jazz Performance

==== Bachelor of Music Performance ====
- Brass
  - Horn
  - Trombone
  - Trumpet
  - Tuba and Euphonium
- Woodwinds
  - Bassoon
  - Clarinet
  - Flute
  - Oboe
  - Saxophone
- Strings
  - Violin
  - Viola
  - Cello
  - Bass
- Keyboard
- Voice
- Percussion

==== Undergraduate Certificates ====
Guitar Studies

Historical Performance

Music Humanities

Community Arts

Jazz Studies

Vernacular Music

==== Undergraduate Minors ====
- Applied Music Studies
- General Music Studies
- Music Technology
- Popular Music

=== Graduate Degrees ===
==== Master of Music ====
Music Composition

Conducting

- Choral Conducting
- Orchestral Conducting
- Wind Conducting

Music Theory

Musicology

Pedagogy

- Strings
- Keyboard

Performance

- Jazz
- Keyboard
- Collaborative Piano
- Strings
- Voice
- Winds
- Percussion

==== Master of Music Education ====
Source:

==== Doctor of Musical Arts ====
Composition

Conducting

- Choral Conducting
- Orchestral Conducting
- Wind Conducting

Performance

Piano Pedagogy

==== Ph.D. in Fine Arts in Music ====
Concentrations:

- Music Education
- Music Theory
- Musicology

==== Ph.D. in Music Education ====
Source:

=== Graduate Certificates ===
Historical Performance

Music Technology

Music Theory Pedagogy

Opera Studies

Piano Pedagogy

== Notable people ==
=== Faculty ===
Faculty Directory

== See also ==
- Texas Tech University Goin' Band from Raiderland
- Vernacular Music Center
