= Talkington College of Visual & Performing Arts =

Arts school of Texas Tech University

J.T. & Margaret Talkington College of Visual & Performing Arts
- Former names: College of Visual & Performing Arts (2002–2016)
- Established: 2002
- Parent institution: Texas Tech University
- Dean: Martin Camacho
- Academic staff: 113
- Students: 1,052
- Undergraduates: 768
- Postgraduates: 284
- Location: Lubbock, Texas, U.S. 33.585730°N 101.873700°W
- Website: www.vpa.ttu.edu

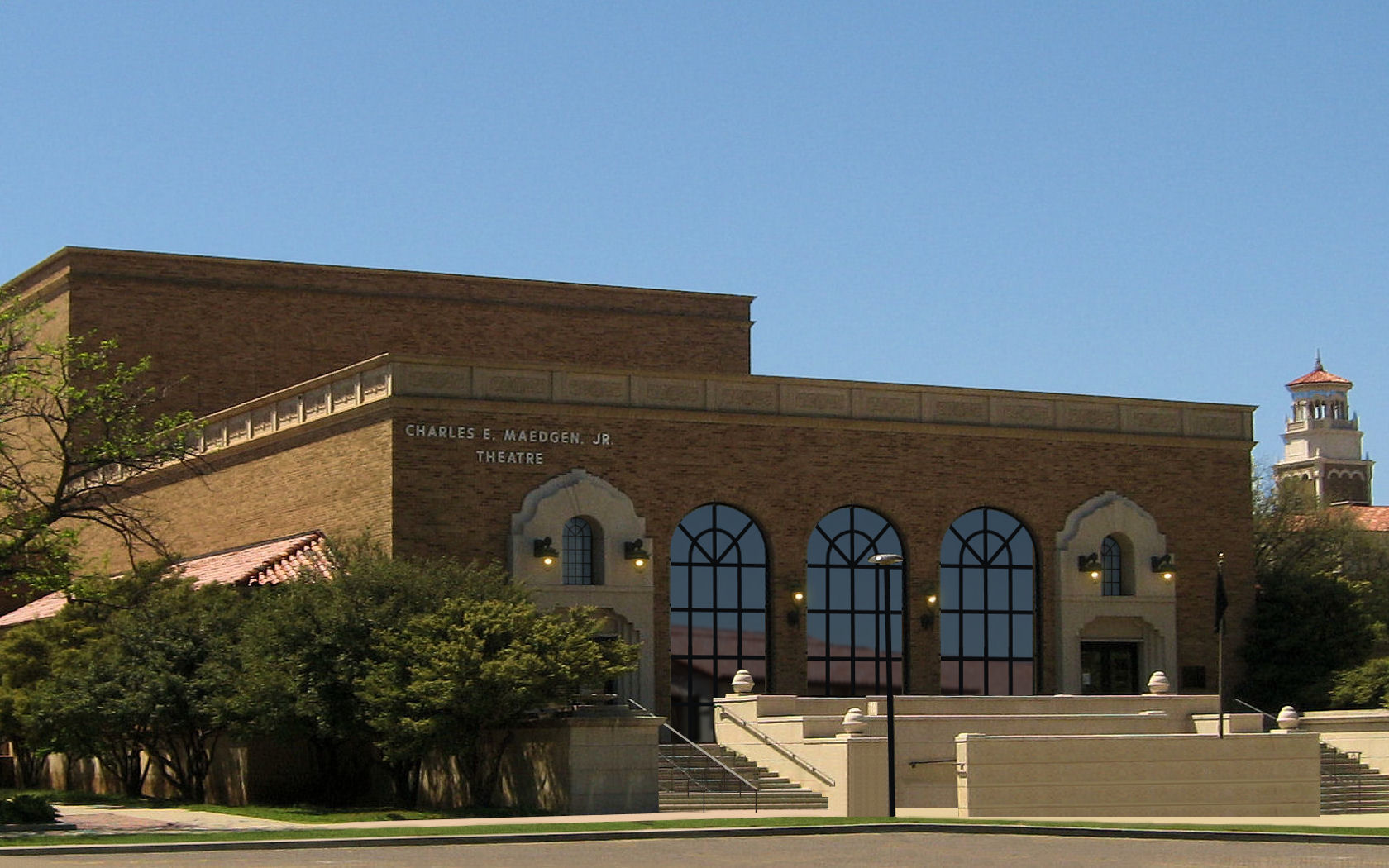
Charles E. Maedgen, Jr. Theatre.

The J. T. & Margaret Talkington College of Visual & Performing Arts is a college at Texas Tech University in Lubbock, Texas. Prior to 2002, the college's departments existed within the College of Arts & Sciences. In 2016, the college was renamed to honor the nearly $70 million in donations to the university by the J.T. and Margaret Talkington Foundation.

Academic programs in the Talkington College are accredited by the National Association of Schools of Art and Design, the National Association of Schools of Music, and the National Association of Schools of Theatre. Additionally, Talkington College's teacher education programs are accredited by the Southern Association of Colleges and Schools and the National Council for the Accreditation of Teacher Education

== Academic departments ==
- School of Art
- School of Music
- School of Theatre and Dance
