= Angela Braly =

American executive (born 1961)

- Born: July 2, 1961 (age 65); Dallas, Texas, U.S.
- Education: Texas Tech University; Southern Methodist University (JD)
- Known for: Ex-President & CEO, WellPoint (now Elevance Health); Board of Directors, Exxon Mobil; Brookfield Asset Management

Angela Fick Braly (born July 2, 1961) is an American executive. She served as president and chief executive officer of WellPoint (now Elevance Health), a large U.S.-based provider of health insurance, and was a member of the company's board of directors. She assumed those responsibilities on June 1, 2007, following several high-profile roles for the company.Braly has served on the board of directors for Exxon Mobil, Brookfield Asset Management, Procter & Gamble, and Lowe's.

== Early life ==
Angela Braly received her undergraduate degree from Texas Tech University in 1982 and her Juris Doctor from Southern Methodist University School of Law. She graduated from Richardson High School in 1979.

== Career ==
She was a partner in the St. Louis law firm of Lewis, Rice & Fingersh, L.C.

In January 1999, she joined WellPoint as general counsel for RightCHOICE (currently Anthem Blue Cross and Blue Shield in Missouri). She also oversaw the Missouri plan's legal and government relations efforts. During that time, she managed the legal strategy resulting in the creation of The Missouri Foundation for Health, which serves the health care needs of underinsured and uninsured people in Missouri. She later became president and CEO of the Missouri plan.

She served as executive vice president, general counsel and chief public affairs officer for WellPoint. In that role, she was responsible for public policy development, government relations, legal affairs, corporate communications, marketing, and social responsibility initiatives. She also had operational responsibility for the nation's largest Medicare claims processing business and the federal employee health benefits business. Braly was also a key strategist during WellPoint's acquisition of New-York based WellChoice in 2005.

On February 24, 2010, Braly gave testimony to Congress defending Wellpoint's insurance premium increases. She served as vice-chairman of the executive committee of The Business Council for 2011 and 2012. She resigned from Wellpoint in August 2012 due to shareholder criticism.

She was recognized by the St. Louis Business Journal as one of the 25 Most Influential Women in Business for 2000 and was named one of Modern Healthcare's Top 25 Women in Healthcare in 2007. Forbes listed Braly as the sixteenth most powerful woman in the world in 2007, fourth most powerful in 2008, and eighth most powerful in 2009. Fortune ranked Braly the fourth most powerful woman in business in America in 2007, fifth most powerful in 2008., and fourth most powerful in 2009.

In May 2013, Braly was named by Indiana Governor Mike Pence to the board of the Indiana Economic Development Corporation.

In 2015, Braly co-founded The Policy Circle, a U.S. nonprofit organization with 501(c)(3) status, focused on civic engagement and public policy education.

Braly has served on the board of directors for ExxonMobil Corporation since 2016. She is currently chair of the compensation committee.

Braly also served on the board of directors at Lowe's from November 2013 to July 2021. Braly also retired from Procter & Gamble Company’s board of directors on June 11, 2024, after serving 13 years. She also serves on the board of directors of Brookfield Asset Management.

== Personal life ==
As of April 2009, Braly had the 306th highest compensation for a U.S. CEO, having earned $4.07 million, which is 74th among females. She owns $4.6 million worth of WellPoint stock, or 0.02% of the company.

In 2007, Braly earned $14.9 million, mostly in stock options. Her total compensation was $8.7 million in 2008, and $13.1 million in 2009.

Braly generally supports Republican and conservative political candidates.
