= Texas Tech University College of Education =

- Established: 1925
- Dean: Kamau Siwatu, Ph.D.
- Faculty: 95
- Students: 1,878 Fall 2022
- Undergraduates: 1,352
- Postgraduates: 526
- Location: Lubbock, Texas, U.S. 33.580205°N 101.879131°W
- Website: www.educ.ttu.edu

Texas Tech University College of Education is a college at Texas Tech University in Lubbock, Texas. The education program has existed at Texas Tech University since 1925. The college is accredited by the National Council for Accreditation of Teacher Education.

== Academic departments ==
- Curriculum and Instruction
- Educational Psychology, Leadership and Counseling
- Special Education
- Teacher Education

== Research centers ==
- Burkhart Center for Autism Education and Research
- Center for Advocacy in Teacher Leadership for Youth and Schools with Technology (CATALYST)
- Center for Innovative Research in Change, Leadership, and Education (CIRCLE)
- Virginia Murray Sowell Center for Research and Education in Visual Impairment

== Gallery ==
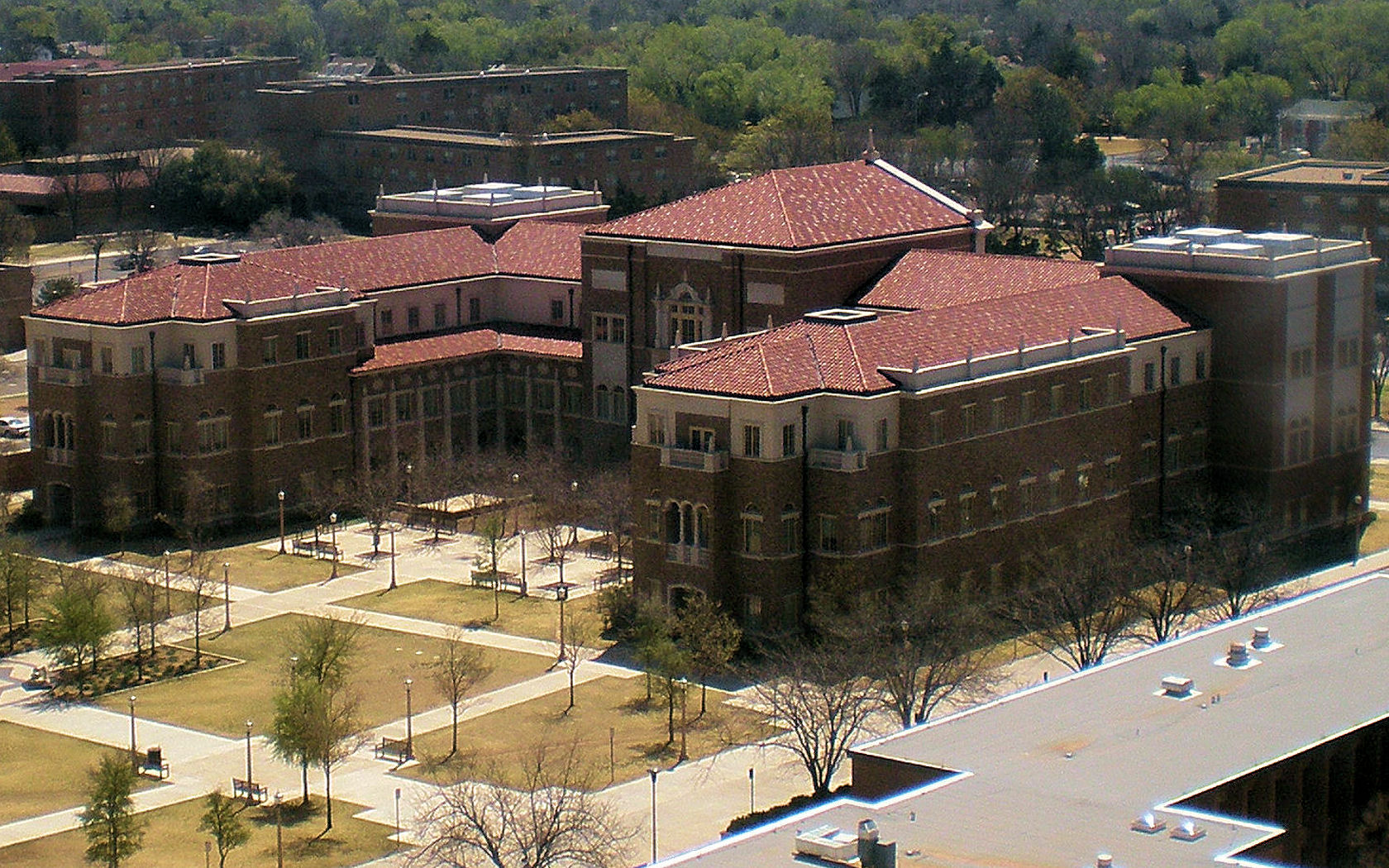
Overhead view of the College of Education

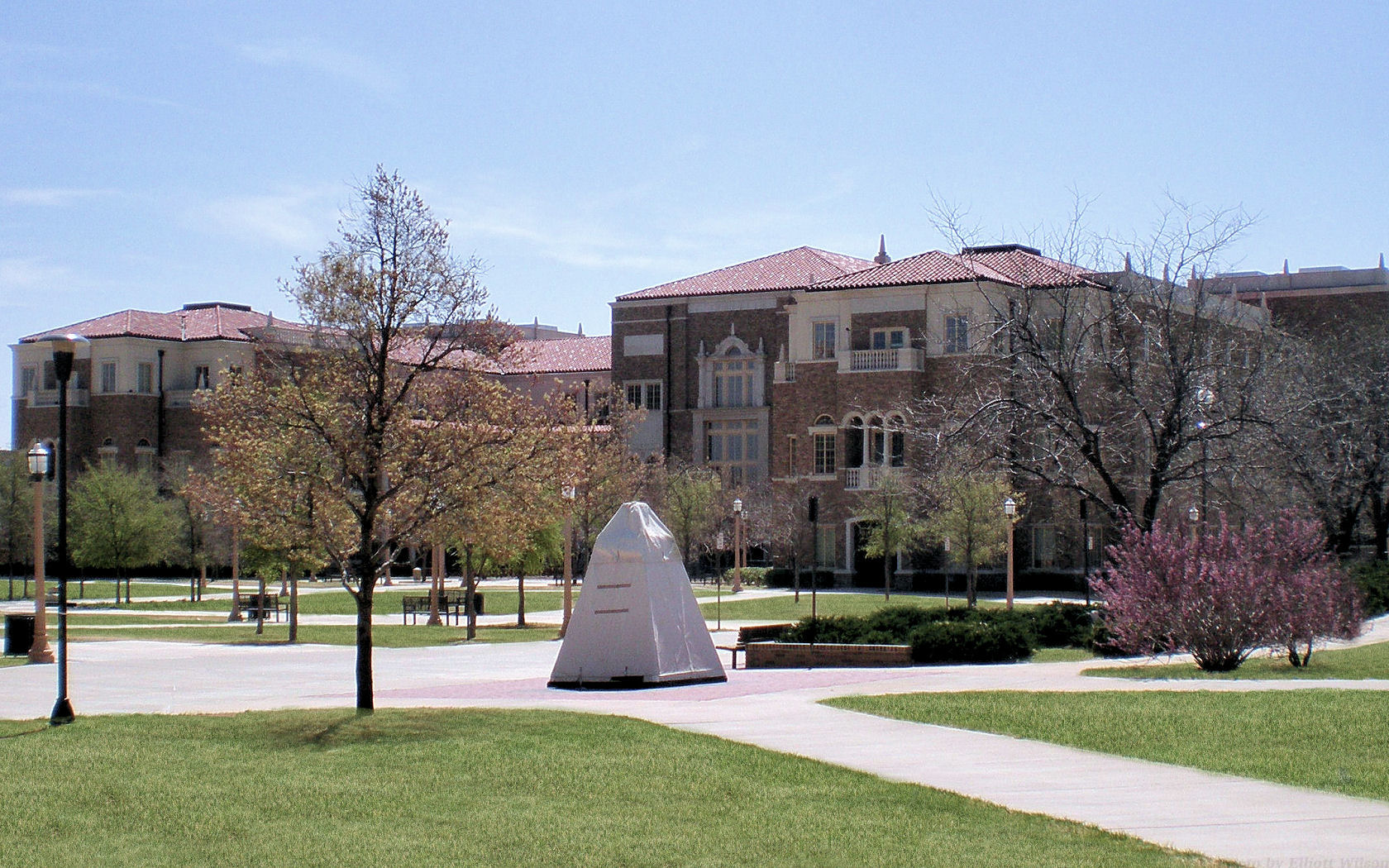
College of Education from north-west

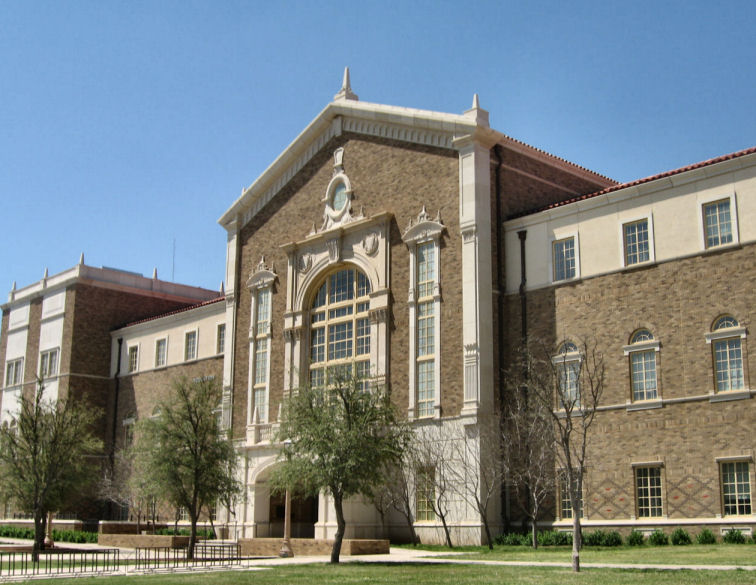
South face of the College of Education
