= Texas Tech University =

Public university in Lubbock, Texas, US

- Former name: Texas Technological College (1923–1969)
- Motto: "From here, it's possible."
- Type: Public research university
- Established: February 10, 1923; 103 years ago
- Parent institution: Texas Tech University System
- Accreditation: SACS
- Academic affiliations: ORAU; UCAR; URA; Space-grant
- Endowment: $2.44 billion (FY2025) (TTU only) $3.35 billion (FY2025) (system-wide)
- Budget: $1.79 billion (FY2026)
- Chancellor: Brandon Creighton
- President: Lawrence Schovanec
- Faculty: 2,131 (fall 2024)
- Students: 42,455 (fall 2025)
- Undergraduates: 34,184 (fall 2025)
- Postgraduates: 8,271 (fall 2025)
- Location: Lubbock, Texas, United States; 33.585°N 101.875°W
- Campus: 1,839 acres (744 ha); Large city
- Newspaper: The Daily Toreador
- Colors: Scarlet and black
- Nicknames: Red Raiders; Lady Raiders
- Sporting affiliations: NCAA Division I FBS – Big 12
- Mascots: Masked Rider; Raider Red
- Website: ttu.edu

Texas Tech University (Texas Tech, TTU, or simply Tech) is a public research university in Lubbock, Texas, United States. Established in 1923 and called Texas Technological College until 1969, it is the flagship institution of the five-institution Texas Tech University System. As of fall 2025, the university enrolled 42,455 students, making it the sixth-largest university in Texas.

The university offers degrees in more than 150 courses of study through 13 colleges and hosts 55 research centers and institutes. Texas Tech University has awarded nearly 325,000 degrees since 1927, including over 75,000 graduate and professional degrees. It is classified among "R1: Doctoral Universities – Very high research activity".

Research projects in the areas of pulsed power, strengthening national security, grid computing, resilience and adaptability, energy, advancing One Health, rural and urban development, and atmospheric sciences are among the most prominent at the university. The Institute for Critical Infrastructure Security works to solve the continuous problem of cyber-security interruptions in critical infrastructure systems. The Institute for One Health Innovation is composed of experts in human, animal and environmental health to better understand how each interacts with the others, and thereby develop a more holistic approach to health for all.

Beginning in 2025 under the chancellorship of Brandon Creighton, the university has attracted controversy and national attention owing to its widespread censorship of topics viewed as left-wing and mandated ideological review of course materials.

The Texas Tech Red Raiders are charter members of the Big 12 Conference and compete in Division I for all varsity sports. The Red Raiders football team has made 41 bowl appearances, which is tied for 20th most of any university. The Lady Raiders basketball team won the 1993 NCAA Division I Tournament.

== History ==
=== Establishment ===
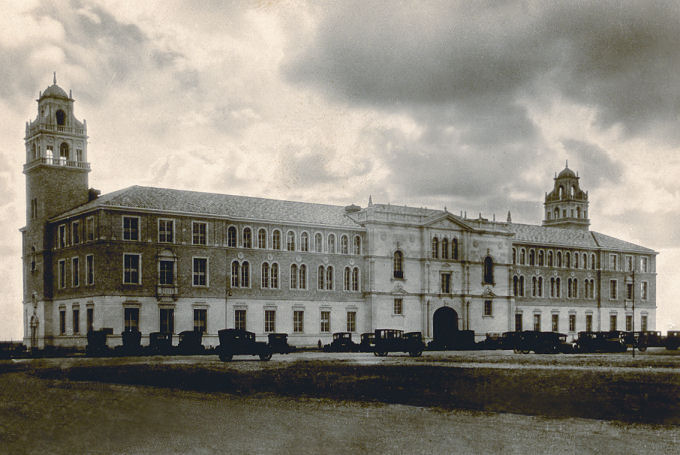
Administration Building (circa 1925)

The call to open a college in West Texas began shortly after settlers arrived in the area in the 1880s. In 1917, the Texas legislature passed a bill creating a branch of Texas A&M to be in Abilene. However, the bill was repealed two years later during the next session after it was discovered Governor James E. Ferguson had falsely reported the site committee's choice of location. After new legislation passed in the state house and senate in 1921, Governor Pat Neff vetoed it, citing hard financial times in West Texas. Furious about Neff's veto, some in West Texas went so far as to recommend that West Texas secede from the state.

In 1923, the legislature decided, rather than a branch campus, a new university would better serve the region's needs under legislation co-authored by State Senator William H. Bledsoe of Lubbock and State Representative Roy Alvin Baldwin of Slaton in southern Lubbock County. On February 10, 1923, Neff signed the legislation creating Texas Technological College, and in July of that year, a committee began searching for a site. When the committee's members visited Lubbock, they were overwhelmed to find residents lining the streets to show support for hosting the institution. That August, Lubbock was chosen on the first ballot over other area towns, including Floydada, Plainview, Big Spring, and Sweetwater. On November 22, 1923, Paul Whitfield Horn was selected as the university's first president.

Construction of the college campus began on November 1, 1924. Ten days later, the cornerstone of the Administration Building was laid in front of 20,000 people. Speakers at the event included Governor Pat Neff; Amon G. Carter; Reverend E. E. Robinson, Colonel Ernest O. Thompson; and Representative Richard M. Chitwood, the chairman of the House Education Committee, who became the first Texas Tech business manager. With an enrollment of 914 students—both men and women—Texas Technological College opened for classes on October 1, 1925. It was originally composed of four schools—Agriculture, Engineering, Home Economics, and Liberal Arts.

Military training was conducted at the college as early as 1925, but formal Reserve Officers' Training Corps training did not start until 1936. By 1939, the school's enrollment had grown to 3,890. Although enrollment declined during World War II, Texas Tech trained 4,747 men in its armed forces training detachments. Following the war, in 1946, the college saw its enrollment leap to 5,366 from a low of 1,696 in 1943.

=== Expansion and growth ===
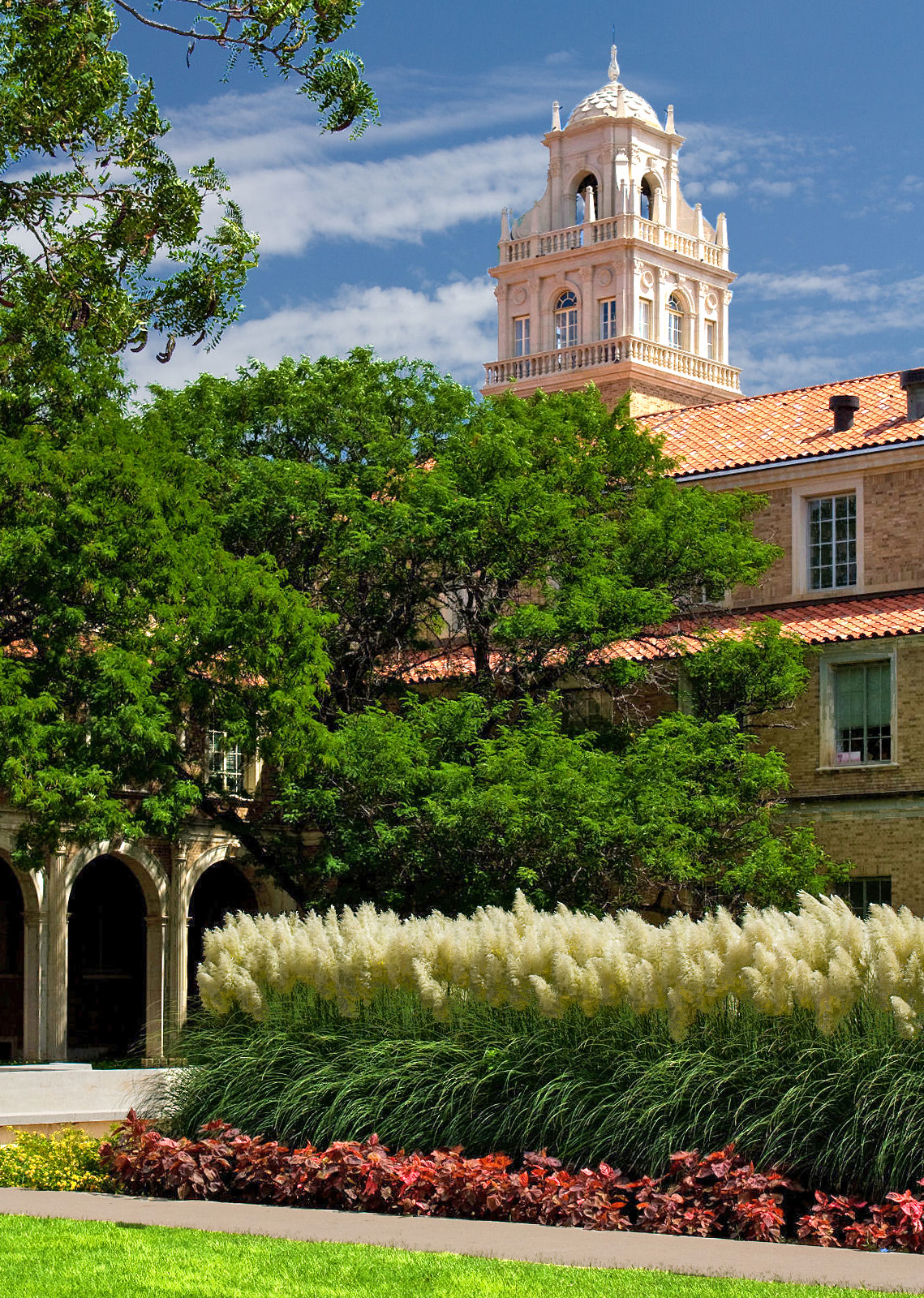
Administration Building

By the 1960s, the school had expanded its offerings to more than just technical subjects. The Faculty Advisory Committee suggested changing the name to "Texas State University", feeling the phrase "Technological College" did not define the institution's scope. While most students supported this change, the Board of Directors and many alumni, wanting to preserve the Double T, opposed it. Other names including the University of the Southwest, Texas Technological College and State University, and The Texas University of Art, Science and Technology were considered, but the Board of Directors chose Texas Tech University, submitting it to the state legislature in 1964.

A failed move by Governor John Connally to have the school placed into the Texas A&M University System, as well as continued disagreement and heated debate over the school's new name, kept the name change from being approved. In spite of objections by many students and faculty, the Board of Directors again submitted the change in 1969. It finally received the legislature's approval on June 6, and the name Texas Tech University went into effect that September. All of the institution's schools, except Law, became colleges.

Texas Tech was integrated in the summer of 1961 when its first African-American student, Lucille S. Graves, was admitted. After its initial rejection of African-American students' enrollment and the threat of a lawsuit, the university enacted a policy to admit "all qualified applicants regardless of color". The university offered its first athletic scholarship to a black student in 1967, when Danny Hardaway was recruited to play for the Red Raiders football team. In 1970, Hortense W. Dixon became the first African American student to earn a doctorate from the university. In 1972 Emory Grant Davis became the first full-time African American faculty member.

In the 1960s and 1970s, the university invested US$150 million in the campus to construct buildings for the library, foreign languages, social sciences, communications, philosophy, electrical and petroleum engineering, art, and architecture. Some other buildings were significantly expanded.

On May 29, 1969, the 61st Texas Legislature created the Texas Tech University School of Medicine. The Texas Legislature expanded the medical school charter in 1979, creating the Texas Tech University Health Sciences Center. TTUHSC, which is now part of the Texas Tech University System, includes Schools of Allied Health Sciences, Medicine, Nursing, Pharmacy, and the Graduate School of Biomedical Sciences. It has locations in four Texas cities in addition to the main campus in Lubbock.

In 2011, the combined enrollment in the Texas Tech University System was greater than 42,000 students—a 48% increase since 2000. Chancellor Kent Hance reiterated plans for Texas Tech's main campus to reach enrollment of 40,000 students by 2020, with additional 5,000 students at Texas Tech University Health Sciences Center and 10,000 students at Angelo State University.

=== 1990s - 2024 ===
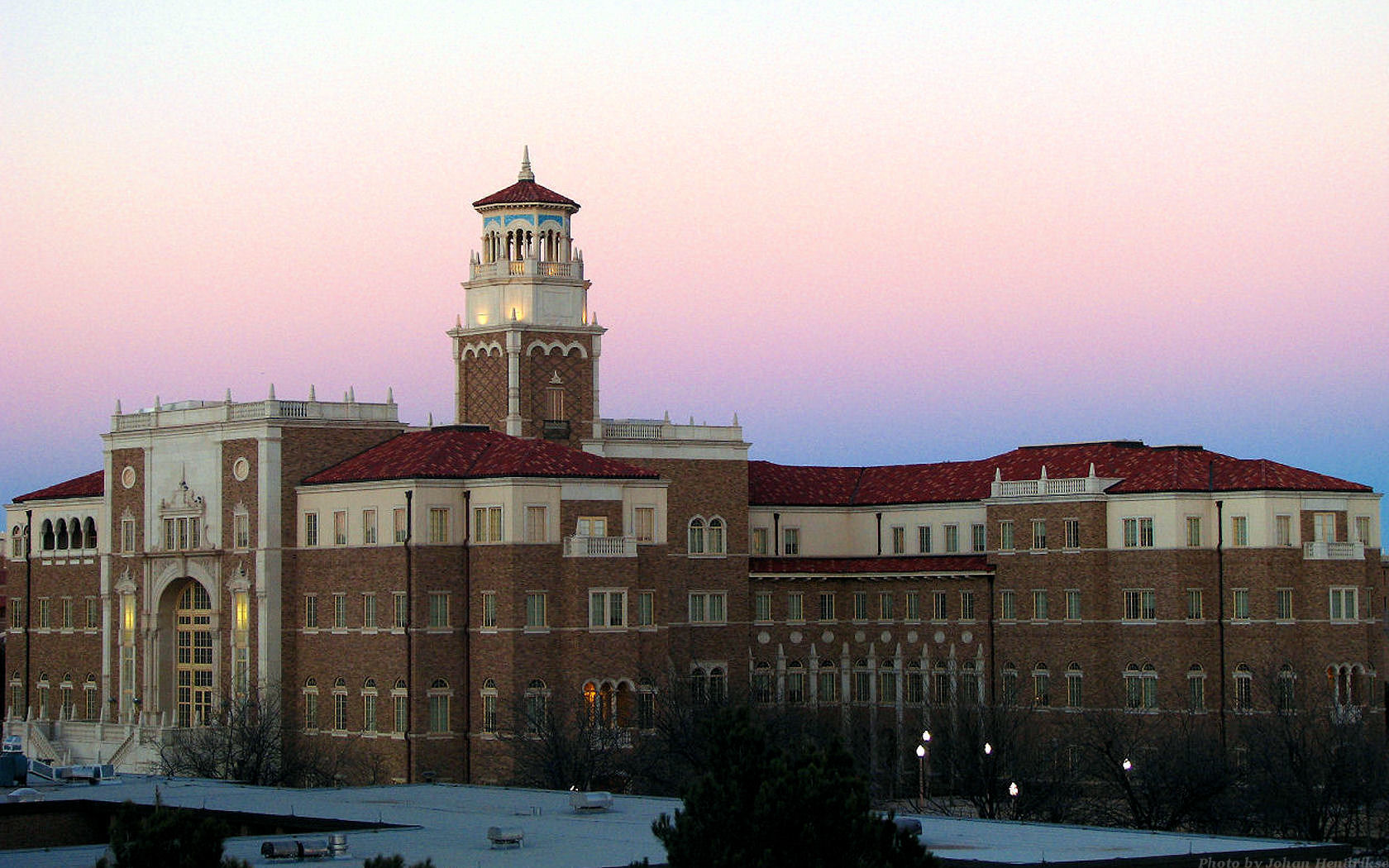
Texas Tech's Humanities Building, with the university's signature Spanish Renaissance-inspired architectural style, faces a building of similar construction for the College of Education.

In 1996, the Board of Regents of Texas Tech University created the Texas Tech University System. Former State Senator John T. Montford, later of San Antonio, was selected as the first chancellor to lead the combined academic enterprise. Regents Chair Edward Whitacre Jr. stated the move was made due to the institution's size and complexity. "It's time," he said, "to take the university into the 21st century". The Texas Tech University system originally included Texas Tech University and Texas Tech University Health Sciences Center. On November 6, 2007, the voters of Texas approved an amendment to the Texas Constitution realigning Angelo State University with the Texas Tech University System. Kent Hance, a Texas Tech graduate who had served as United States Representative and as one of the three elected members of the Railroad Commission of Texas, assumed the duties of chancellor on December 1, 2006.

The university has invested more than $548 million in new construction since 2000. It has also received more than $65.9 million in private donations. In April 2009, the Texas House of Representatives passed a bill to increase state funding for seven public universities. Texas Tech University was classified by the state as an "Emerging Research University", and was among the universities that received additional state funding for advancement toward "Tier 1" status. Three funds—the Research University Development Fund, the Texas Research Incentive Program, and the National Research University Benchmark Fund—provided $500 million in grants and matching funds during fiscal years 2010 and 2011. On September 2, 2009, the university announced it had received private gifts totaling $24.3 million. Of these, $21.5 million are eligible for match under the Texas Research Incentive Program.

In late 2011 and throughout 2012–13, construction began on several new buildings on campus. The construction included a new $20 million Petroleum Engineering and Research building, a new building to house the Rawls College of Business, two new residence halls, a $3.5 million chapel, and extensive remodeling of the building that previously housed the Rawls College of Business. In 2021, construction began on the new $100 million, 125,000-square-foot Academic Sciences Building.

The university system's endowment reached $1.043 billion in March 2014.

In 2023, Texas voters approved the creation of a new funding mechanism, the Texas University Fund. Its $3.9 billion endowment was created by combining a one-time grant from the state's budget surplus with the National Research University Fund, interest income from the Economic Stabilization Fund, and charitable contributions. Four Texas universities, including Texas Tech, initially qualified to receive TUF funds based on their research expenditures and doctoral degrees awarded annually. Texas Tech received approximately $44 million for fiscal year 2024.

=== Trump era ===
In September 2025, amidst a wider movement by the Texas public university system, the state of Texas more broadly, and the federal government to restrict the rights of transgender people, the university implemented a policy ordering all faculty and staff to comply with President Donald Trump's Executive Order 14168 and orders from Governor Greg Abbott to "reject woke ideologies". The policy prohibited classroom or student discussion of transgender topics, and mandated the recognition of the genders male and female as determined solely at birth. The policy was met with backlash by professors and students alike.

In April 2026, professors from the English department reported being told that they could no longer teach books written by gay authors or featuring gay characters. Another measure implemented later that month banned student theses or dissertations from making mention of LGBT topics in any capacity.

In August 2026, The New York Times reported that Creighton's tenure had featured widespread censorship of topics viewed as left-wing from college curriculum, and that some material for censorship involved the use of AI. It reported that he had ordered "closures of programs centered on sexual orientation or gender identity, required the recognition of only two sexes and outlawed student dissertations on gender identity" and mandated all professors submit their course material for ideological review. The Times reported that courses on the Holocaust were changed to a graduate course owing to gay and bisexual men being targeted by the Nazis, and that professors reported they had self-censored content such as teaching certain aspects of Viking mythology owing to gender-changing gods like Loki and Odin.

== Academics ==
Academic rankings

National
- Forbes: 149
- U.S. News & World Report: 186 (tie)
- Washington Monthly: 426
- WSJ/College Pulse: 225

Global
- ARWU: 401-500
- QS: 731-740
- THE: 601-800
- U.S. News & World Report: 562 (tie)

By enrollment, Texas Tech is the sixth-largest university in Texas. Altogether, the university has educated students from all 50 US states and over 100 foreign countries. Enrollment has continued to increase in recent years, and the university achieved Chancellor Kent Hance's goal to enroll 40,000 students by 2020. From 1927 through fiscal year 2023, the university awarded 249,780 bachelor's, 55,265 master's, 10,357 doctoral, and 9,449 law degrees.

As a public university, Texas Tech is subject to Texas House Bill 588, which guarantees Texas high school seniors in the top 10% of their graduating class admission to any public Texas university. About half of incoming first-year students finish in the top quarter of their graduating classes.

Texas Tech University is accredited by the Southern Association of Colleges and Schools. The university offers 150 bachelor's, 104 master's, and 59 doctoral degree programs. Texas Tech has seven regional campuses in Texas—in Amarillo, the Dallas/Fort Worth Metroplex, El Paso, Fredericksburg, Junction, Marble Falls, and Waco.

Texas Tech has a satellite campus in Europe, in Seville, Spain, and one in Escazú, San José, Costa Rica.

=== Colleges and schools ===
Texas Tech has expanded from its original four schools to comprise ten colleges and two schools.

The Whitacre College of Engineering offers 10 engineering programs accredited by ABET. On November 12, 2008, following a $25 million gift from AT&T in honor of alumnus Edward Whitacre Jr., the college was formally renamed the Edward E. Whitacre Jr. College of Engineering.

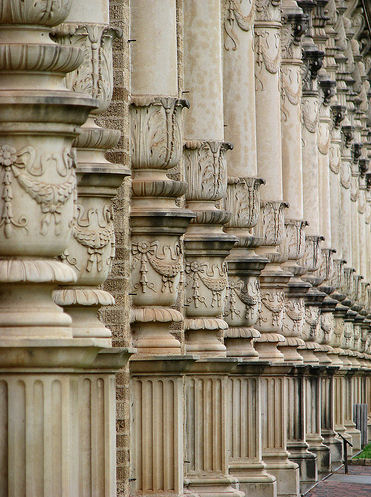
Chemistry Building

The largest academic division on campus, the College of Arts & Sciences offers bachelor's, master's, and doctoral degrees in a wide range of subjects from philosophy to mathematics. In 2004, the College of Mass Communications and the College of Visual & Performing Arts were created from programs organized within the College of Arts & Sciences. The College of Mass Communications changed its name to the College of Media & Communication in 2012 and offers degrees in several areas, including advertising, journalism, digital media and professional communication, and public relations. The College of Visual & Performing Arts was renamed in honor of the contributions by the J.T. & Margaret Talkington Foundation in 2016. Programs offered through Talkington College are accredited by the National Association of Schools of Art and Design, the National Association of Schools of Music, and the National Association of Schools of Theatre.

Once the Division of Home Economics, the College of Health & Human Sciences now offers degrees in community, family and addiction sciences; apparel design and interior design; health professions; hospitality and retail management; human development and family sciences; nutritional sciences; and personal financial planning. The School of Personal Financial Planning was the first CFP Board-registered Ph.D. program in the nation when it was founded in 2000. It is still consistently ranked among the top programs in the nation. Its students won the Financial Planning Association's Financial Planning Challenge in 2024, 2023, 2021, 2020, and 2018.

The Huckabee College of Architecture, founded in 1927, offers programs accredited by the National Architectural Accrediting Board.

The Rawls College of Business, which is accredited by the Association to Advance Collegiate Schools of Business, is the university's business school. The college offers bachelor's, master's, and doctoral degrees in business disciplines. From its origin in 1942, the business school was known as the Division of Commerce, until it was renamed the College of Business Administration in 1956. In 2000, following a $25 million gift from alumnus Jerry S. Rawls, the college was formally renamed the Jerry S. Rawls College of Business.

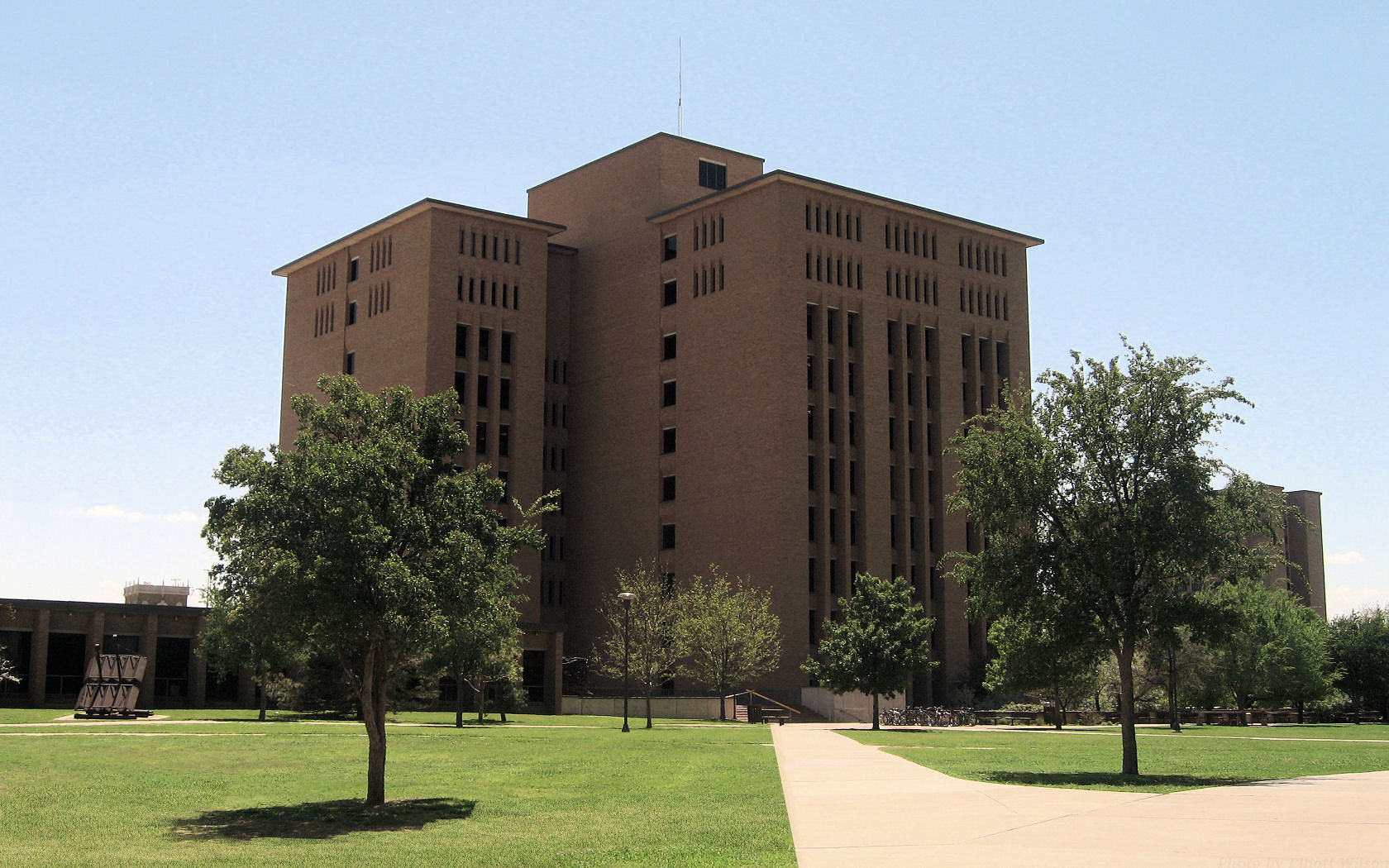
Architecture Building

In 1967, both the College of Education and the Texas Tech University School of Law were founded. The College of Education instructs future teachers and is accredited by the National Council for Accreditation of Teacher Education.

The School of Law is an American Bar Association-accredited law school on the main campus in Lubbock.

In September 2008, Texas Tech established the College of Outreach and Distance Education, known today as Texas Tech Online. Texas Tech's seven in-state satellite campuses are under the auspices of the college. Additionally, it oversees the Texas Tech University Independent School District and its signature program, Texas Tech K-12.

The Texas Tech University System also operates a medical school, the Texas Tech University Health Sciences Center (TTUHSC). It offers schools of biomedical sciences, health professions, medicine, nursing, pharmacy, and population and public health. While it is a discrete entity, separate from Texas Tech University, it offers joint degrees (such as MD/MBA) through coordination with the university. Further, the Health Sciences Center campus is adjacent to the university's main campus in Lubbock. In addition to its Lubbock campus, TTUHSC has campuses in Abilene, Amarillo, El Paso, Dallas, and Odessa.

=== Research ===
The university is classified among "R1: Doctoral Universities – Very high research activity" and hosts 55 research centers and institutes. According to the National Science Foundation, Texas Tech had $240.1 million in research development funding and expenditures in fiscal year 2023, ranking Texas Tech 122nd in the nation.

The National Wind Institute (formerly the Wind Science and Engineering Research Center or WISE) was established following the May 11, 1970, Lubbock Tornado that caused 26 fatalities and over $1.06 billion (2024 dollars) in damage in Lubbock. The National Wind Institute, which includes 56,000 square feet (5,200 m^{2}) of indoor laboratory space, is focused on research, education, and information outreach. The interdisciplinary research program studies methods to exploit the beneficial qualities of wind and to mitigate its detrimental effects. The institute offers education in wind science and engineering to develop professionals who are experts in creating designs that deal effectively with problems caused by high winds. The institute established the nation's first Ph.D. program in Wind Science and Engineering in 2003. National Wind Institute researchers contributed significantly to the development of the Enhanced Fujita Scale for rating the strength of tornadoes.

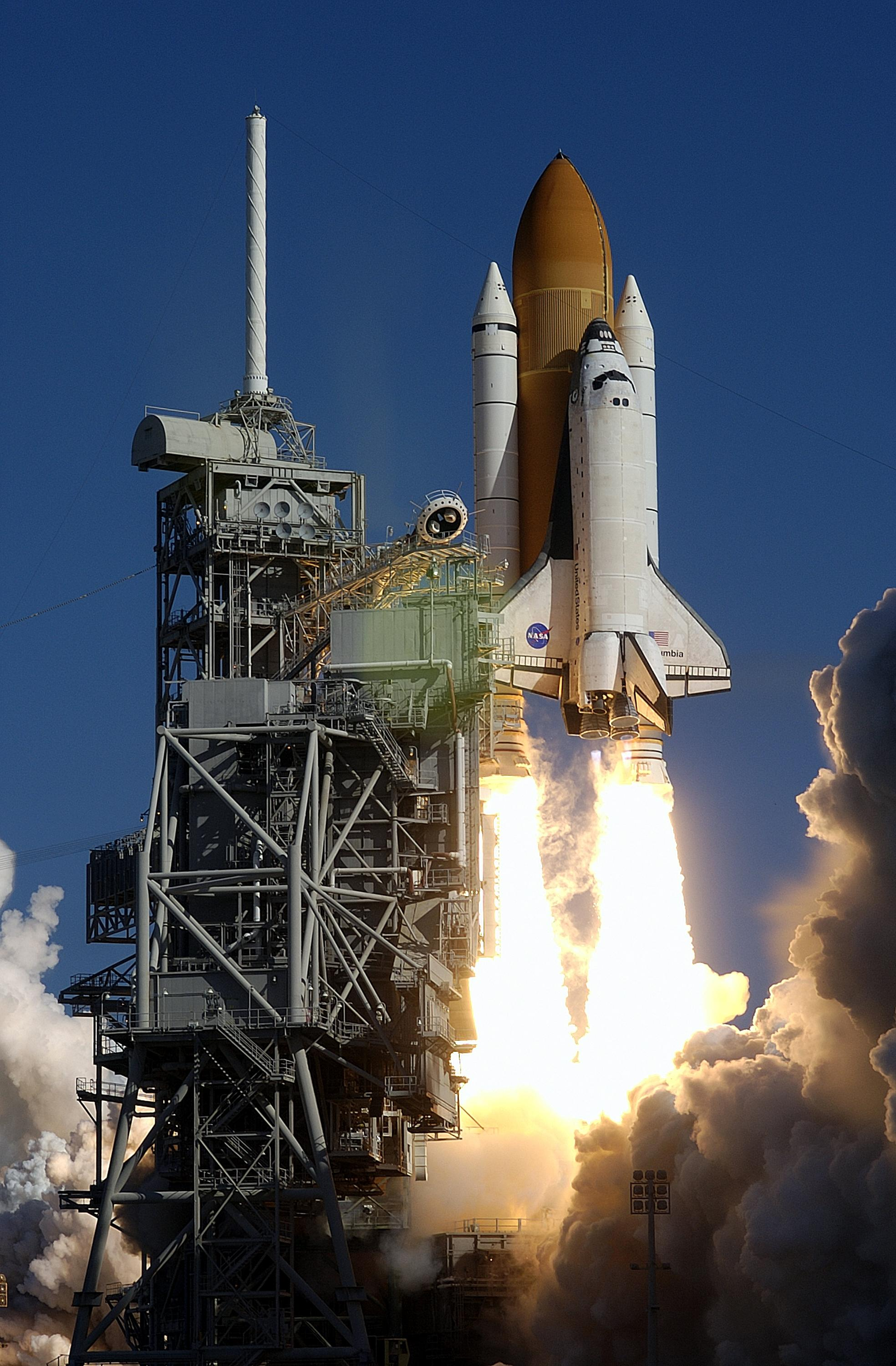
Texas Tech alumnus Rick Husband was the final commander of Space Shuttle Columbia.

Texas Tech has made contributions to NASA and the spaceflight industry. The university's Charles A. Bassett II Pulse Laboratory honors engineering alumnus and Gemini-era astronaut Charles A. Bassett II. In total, Texas Tech has helped to produce five astronauts including Bassett, Paul Lockhart, and Rick Husband; Husband was commander of STS-107, the final flight of Space Shuttle Columbia. (Note: Astronaut Fact Book was last published by NASA in 2013. Joseph Acaba is a 2015 graduate of the College of Education.) Texas Tech has partnered with NASA to perfect methods for growing fresh vegetables in space and to determine the most efficient ways to recycle wastewater.

Building on existing research area, Texas Tech focuses its research on energy, One Health, and rural and urban development.

Texas Tech's Davis College of Agricultural Sciences & Natural Resources has received state and federal grants for research projects including the fiber properties of cotton, the antibacterial properties of cotton fabric, and the development of chemical-warfare protective fabrics. The college has also created two grass variants, Shadow Turf, a drought-tolerant turf grass that thrives in shade, and Tech Turf (marketed as Turffalo), a turf grass with the rich color and texture of Bermuda and the resilience of buffalo grass.

==== Research institutes ====
Research institutes at the university include:

- National Wind Institute (NWI): A wind research institute at Texas Tech, created following the 1970 Lubbock Tornado. The NWI has evolved from its traditional singular focus on wind hazards to three main research pillars of energy systems, atmospheric measurement & simulation, and wind engineering.
- Institute for Critical Infrastructure Security (ICIS): This institute works with federal partners to understand existing and new cyber security threats. Through partnerships with industry, national labs and educational organizations, ICIS monitors and updates networks to strengthen critical infrastructure security to protect lives and livelihoods.
- Fiber & Biopolymer Research Institute (FBRI): The FBRI is committed to serving the research needs of university researchers, cotton breeders, public agencies, and textile manufacturers. Research done within the institute is changing the way the world talks about fiber quality.
- Institute for One Health Innovation: A multidisciplinary research institute that brings together experts from human, animal and environmental health to better understand how each interacts with the others, and thereby develop a more holistic approach to health for all.
- International Center for Food Industry Excellence (ICFIE): ICFIE provides conducts research, and technology transfer across the four pillars of food security. The center provides faculty expertise and collaborative resources in food access, availability, stability and utilization both domestically and internationally.

=== Online and regional learning programs ===
Texas Tech offers online and regional programs in addition to programs offered on the main campus. There are programs that are fully online, hybrid/blended, and at regional sites. The university offers bachelor's, master's, and doctoral degrees, as well as a graduate certification preparation program, at the regional sites of Amarillo, Dallas/Fort Worth, El Paso, Fredericksburg, Junction, Marble Falls, and Waco.

Texas Tech's online programs also gained recognition from U.S. News & World Report, ranking 22nd on their list of the best online MBA programs and 19th on their list of the best online MBA programs for veterans.

== Campus ==
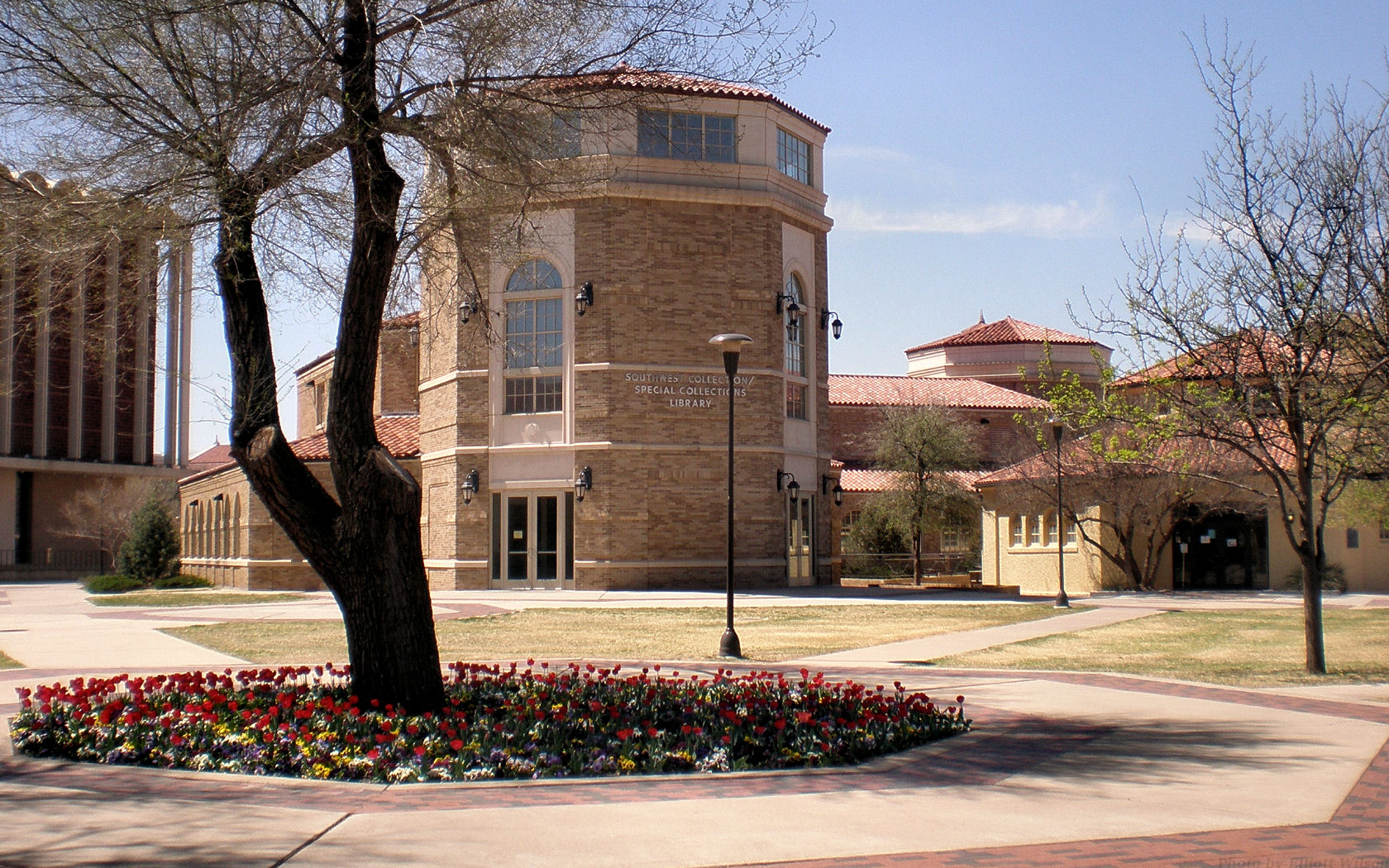
Southwest Collection/Special Collections Library

The Lubbock campus is home to the main academic university, law school, and medical school (Health Sciences Center). It is one of two institutions (the other being UT Austin) in Texas to have a graduate school, law school, and medical school on its main campus. The campus has Spanish Renaissance architecture. Many buildings borrow architectural elements from those found at University de Alcalá in Alcalá de Henares, Spain, and Mission San José in San Antonio. A large section of the campus built between 1924 and 1951 is listed on the National Register of Historic Places as the Texas Technological College Historic District. This area is roughly bounded by 6th Street on the north, University Avenue on the east, 19th Street on the south, and Flint Street on the west.

In 1998, the Board of Regents of the Texas Tech University System created the Texas Tech University Public Art Collection to enliven the campus environment and extend the university's educational mission. It is funded by using one percent of the estimated total cost of each new building on campus. The collection features pieces from artists such as Tom Otterness and Glenna Goodacre. In 2020, Fodor's Travel ranked the Public Art Collection among the ten best outdoor museums in the United States.

The university also hosts the Museum of Texas Tech University, which was founded in 1929 and is accredited by the American Alliance of Museums. The museum is home to over eight million objects and specimens and houses the Moody Planetarium, art galleries, a sculpture court, and a natural science research laboratory. It also operates the Val Verde County research site and the Lubbock Lake Landmark, an archaeological site and natural history preserve in the city of Lubbock. The site has evidence of 12,000 years of use by ancient cultures on the Llano Estacado (Southern High Plains), and allows visitors to watch active archaeological digs. Visiting scientists and tourists may also participate in the discovery process. Lubbock Lake Landmark is a National Historic Landmark, which lists it on the National Register of Historic Places, and is a designated State Archaeological Landmark. Texas Tech is also the location of the Southwest Collection historical archive and the sponsoring institution of the West Texas Historical Association. Located on the northern edge of the campus is the National Ranching Heritage Center, a museum of ranching history. The site spans 27.5 acres (0.111 km^{2}) and is home to 38 historic structures that have been restored to their original condition. Structures represented at the center include a linecamp, a dugout, a bunkhouse, a blacksmith shop, a cowchip house, a schoolhouse, corrals, shipping pens, windmills, chuckwagons, and a coal-burning locomotive.

The university maintains a number of libraries, some general-purpose and some dedicated to specific topics such as architecture and law. Among the most notable of these are the Southwest Collection/Special Collections Library and The Vietnam Center and Sam Johnson Vietnam Archive, the nation's largest and most comprehensive collection of information on the Vietnam War. On August 17, 2007, the Vietnam Center and Archive became the first US institution to sign a formalized exchange agreement with the State Records and Archives Department of Vietnam. This opened the door for a two-way exchange between the entities. In 2023, Texas Tech returned to the families of Vietnamese soldiers killed in battle their personal documents, which had been found on the battlefield by American soldiers.

== Student life ==
Student body composition as of Fall 2024
Race and ethnicity	Total
White	49.7%
Hispanic	27.6%
Foreign national	7.2%
Other (Note: Other consists of Multiracial Americans & those who prefer to not say.)	6.2%
Black	5.8%
Asian	3.4%
Economic diversity
Low-income (Note: The percentage of students who received an income-based federal Pell grant intended for low-income students.)	24%
Affluent (Note: The percentage of students who are a part of the American middle class at the bare minimum.)	76%

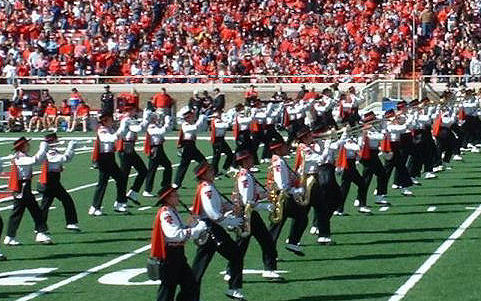
Goin' Band from Raiderland

There are over 620 student clubs and organizations at Texas Tech. Many students participate in Fraternity & Sorority Life.

The Texas Tech Band is called Goin' Band from Raiderland. The 450-member band, which was awarded the Sudler Trophy in 1999, performs at football games and other events.

Most students live on campus for at least a portion of their time at Texas Tech. Students with fewer than 30 hours of academic credit are required to live in university housing unless they receive an exemption. Specific residence halls and communities exist for graduate students, athletes, and various specific interests and academic disciplines. Every resident on campus is a member of the Texas Tech Residence Hall Association, which provides various on-campus programming and leadership opportunities. RHA is led by an Executive Board and Senate with student representatives from each residence hall. The organization is also a member of the South West Affiliate of College and Universities Residence Halls.

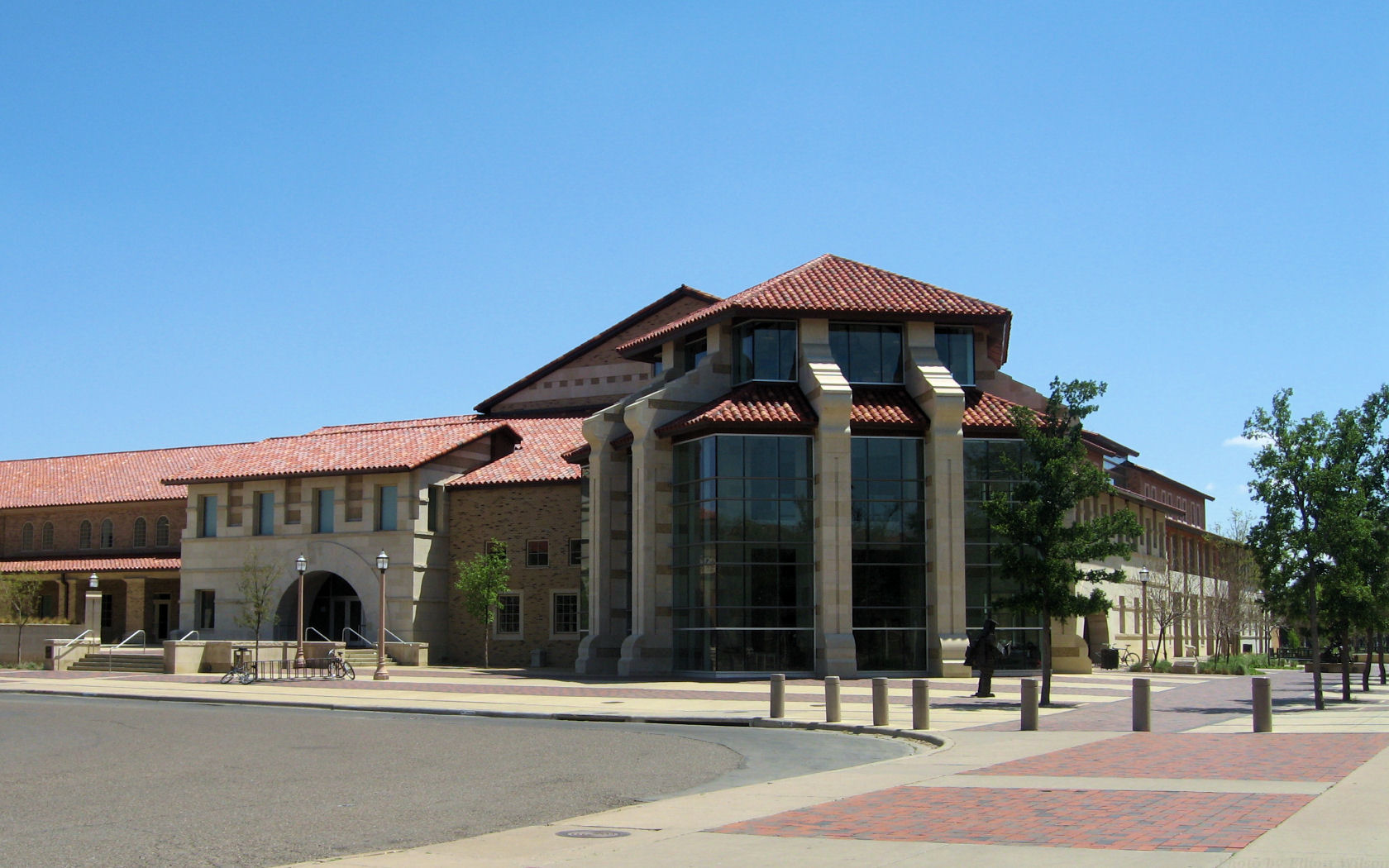
Student Union Building

The university maintains KTXT-FM 88.1, a student-operated radio station focusing on alternative music. National Public Radio station KTTZ-FM 89.1, which features classical music and news, is also found on campus. Additionally, the university owns and operates Public Broadcasting Service television station KTTZ-TV. Students run a newspaper, The Daily Toreador, until 2005 known as The University Daily. Until 2020, the university also produced a yearbook, La Ventana.

Over 25% of its undergraduate student population identifies as Hispanic, which designates the university as a Hispanic-serving institution.

== Athletics ==
Texas Tech's athletic teams are known as the Red Raiders with the exception of the women's basketball team, which is known as the Lady Raiders. Texas Tech competes in NCAA Division I FBS (formerly Division I-A) and is a member of the Big 12 Conference. From 1932 until 1956, the university belonged to the Border Intercollegiate Athletic Association. After being rejected eight times over more than 20 years, the Southwest Conference admitted Texas Tech on May 12, 1956. When the Southwest Conference disbanded in 1995, Texas Tech, along with the University of Texas at Austin, Texas A&M University, and Baylor University, merged with schools from the former Big Eight Conference to form the Big 12. Athletic Director Kirby Hocutt is a member of the College Football Playoff committee.

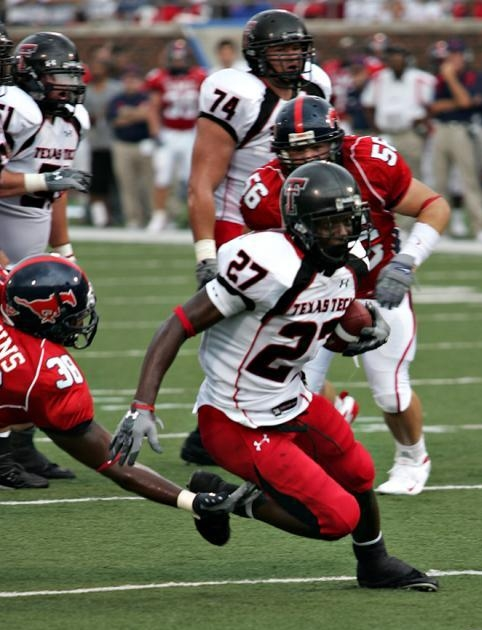
Red Raiders in action in 2007

The Texas Tech Lady Raiders, led by player Sheryl Swoopes and head coach Marsha Sharp, won the 1993 NCAA Division I Women's Basketball Championship. The men's basketball team has made 14 appearances in the NCAA Men's Division I Tournament. Bob Knight served as men's basketball coach from the beginning of the 2001 season until February 4, 2008. On January 1, 2007, he set the record for most coaching victories in men's NCAA Division I basketball history when the Red Raiders defeated the New Mexico Lobos, 70–68. Upon Knight's retirement, his son Pat Knight became the head coach of the team for several seasons until Billy Gillispie replaced him. In 2013, Tubby Smith replaced Gillispie. After Tubby Smith's departure in 2016, Chris Beard, an assistant under Bob Knight, came aboard. Beard quickly achieved national attention, leading the team to its first Elite Eight appearance in just his second season. He led the Red Raiders to the Final Four in his third year, losing in the National Championship game to Virginia. The Red Raiders current head coach is Grant McCasland.

Since 1999, Texas Tech has played home basketball games at United Supermarkets Arena, a 15,020-seat multipurpose facility which cost $120 million in 2025 dollars to build. In addition to serving as home to the men's and women's basketball teams, the Red Raider volleyball team uses the arena. Texas Tech students broke the Big 12 Conference record for student attendance at the United Supermarkets Arena during a February 25, 2014, loss to Kansas State. The record of 6,086 students fell less than 2,000 short of the national record.

The Red Raiders football team, is a member of the NCAA Football Bowl Subdivision (formerly known as Division I-A) and is coached by Joey McGuire. Throughout the 2000s, then head coach Mike Leach lead the team to national prominence. The Red Raiders have made 41 bowl appearances, which is 20th most of any university. From 1932 to 1956, as members of the Border Intercollegiate Athletic Association, the Red Raiders won eight conference championships and one co-championship, the most held by a Border Conference member. After joining the Southwest Conference, the Red Raiders added conference co-championships in 1976 and 1994.

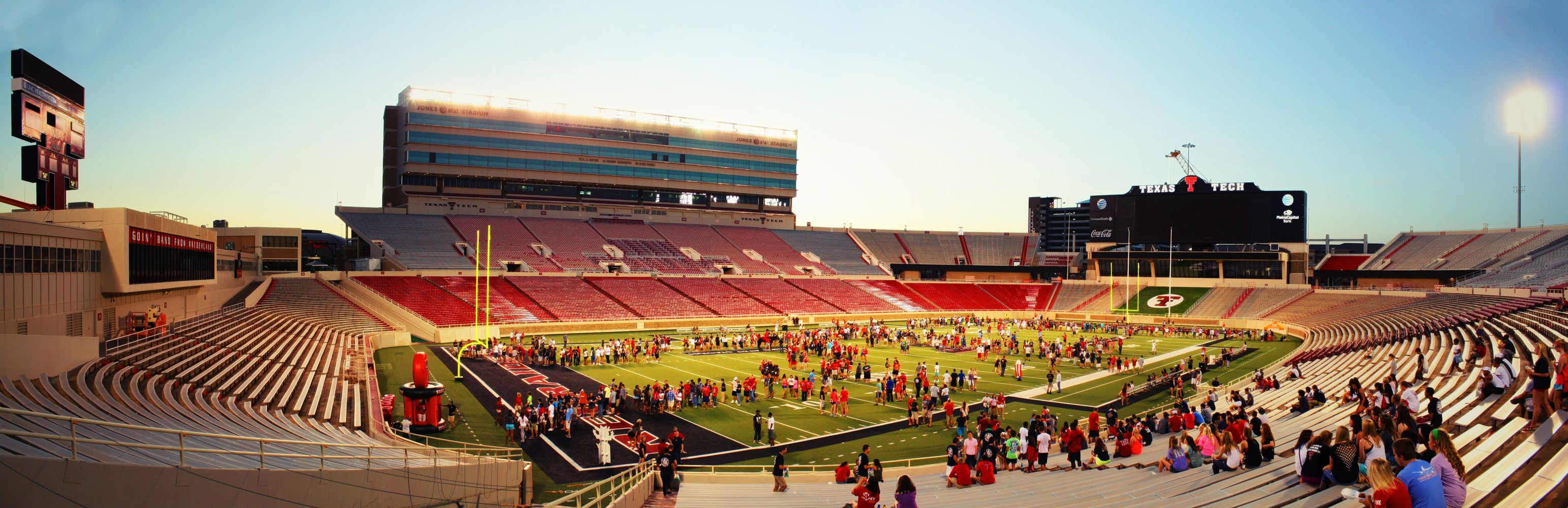
Galaxy Stadium

Galaxy Stadium is home to the Red Raiders football team. The stadium, named for Clifford B. and Audrey Jones, opened in 1947 and has a capacity of 60,229. In 2000, the stadium was renamed Jones SBC Stadium after SBC Communications made a $30 million contribution to the university. Following SBC Communications' acquisition of AT&T Corporation in 2006 and its subsequent adoption of the AT&T name, the stadium was renamed Jones AT&T Stadium. The stadium's original seating capacity was 27,000, but it was expanded several times. As of fall 2024, its total capacity is 60,229. On July 17, 2026, the name was changed to Galaxy Stadium after a new 15-year deal was signed with Galaxy Digital, a tech infrastructure company whose Helios Data Center is located in Dickens County.

On August 7, 2008, the Board of Regents of the Texas Tech University System announced a $25 million expansion project. The expansion added a Spanish Renaissance-themed façade to the stadium's east side. In addition to the improvements to the facility's exterior, the expansion added 1,000 general-admission seats, 550 club seats, and 26 suites. Texas Tech allocated $19 million to the expansion and added another $6 million through fund-raising initiatives. On November 20, 2008, university officials announced the project's fundraising goal had been exceeded. The expansion' groundbreaking ceremonies took place on November 29, 2008, and construction was completed before the 2009 football season.

The south end zone project, completed in 2024, marked the largest athletic facility investment in the university's history. It upgraded the stands behind the south end zone and created more than 300,000 square feet for player development and fan amenities.

The Red Raiders baseball team played its first game in 1925. The team has two conference championships, two conference tournament championships, and has made nine NCAA Division I Baseball Championship tournament appearances. Larry Hays coached the team from 1987 to 2008 and compiled a .639 winning percentage. Following Hays' retirement on June 2, 2008, Assistant Coach Dan Spencer was promoted to head coach. Dan Spencer was replaced by Tim Tadlock following the 2012 season and made its first appearance in the College World Series in 2013. At least 20 former Red Raiders baseball players have gone on to play in the Major Leagues. Alumnus Josh Jung won the 2023 World Series as a member of the Texas Rangers. The Texas Tech team plays its home games at Dan Law Field at Rip Griffin Park. The field, renovated in 2012 and on the main campus in Lubbock, has a seating capacity of 5,050.

Texas Tech's track and field teams have been led by head coach Wes Kittley since 2000. Under Kittley, the men's team won the 2019 NCAA Division I Outdoor Track and Field Championships and the 2024 NCAA Division I Indoor Track and Field Championships. It has produced seven Olympic medalists, 16 national champions, over 200 All-Americans and 119 Big 12 Champions, including Michael Mathieu, Sally Kipyego, Kennedy Kithuka, Shereefa Lloyd, Gil Roberts and others.

In addition to varsity sports, the university's Sport Clubs Federation offers 30 recreational and competitive sport clubs, including polo, rugby union, lacrosse, fencing, and soccer.

=== Mascots ===
The Masked Rider is Texas Tech University's oldest mascot. The tradition began in 1936, when "ghost riders" were dared to circle the field prior to home football games. The Masked Rider became an official mascot in 1954, when Joe Kirk Fulton led the team onto the field at the Gator Bowl. According to reports from those at the game, the crowd sat in stunned silence as they watched Fulton and his horse Blackie rush onto the football field, followed by the team. After a few moments, the silent crowd burst into cheers. In 2000, The Masked Rider tradition was commemorated with the unveiling of a statue outside of the university's Frazier Alumni Pavilion. The sculpture, created by artist Grant Speed, is 25% larger than life.

Texas Tech's other mascot, Raider Red, is a more recent creation. Beginning with the 1971 football season, the Southwest Conference forbade the inclusion of live animal mascots to away games unless the host school consented. For situations where the host school did not want to allow the Masked Rider's horse, an alternative mascot was needed. Jim Gaspard, a member of the Saddle Tramps student spirit organization, created the original design for the Raider Red costume, basing it on a character created by cartoonist Dirk West, a Texas Tech alumnus and former Lubbock mayor. Although the Masked Rider's identity is public knowledge, it has always been tradition that Raider Red's student alter ego is kept secret until the end of his or her tenure. The student serving as Raider Red is a member of the Saddle Tramps or High Riders.

== Traditions ==
=== Carol of Lights ===
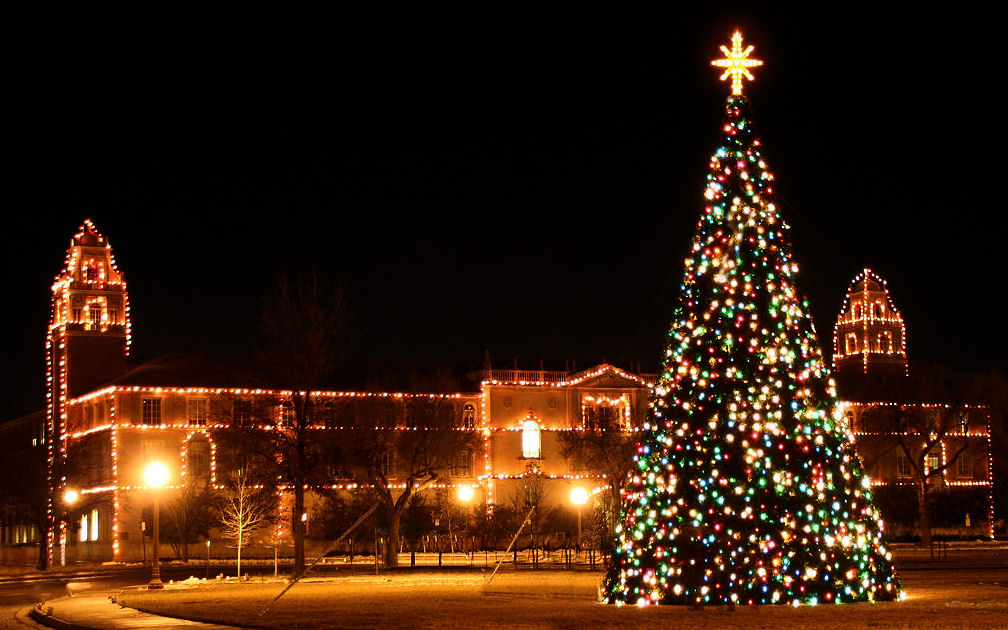
Carol of Lights

The Carol of Lights is an annual event, sponsored by the Residence Halls Association, to celebrate the holiday season. The event begins with a carillon concert, from the 46 bells in the west tower of the Administration Building followed a torch-light processional by the Saddle Tramps and High Riders spirit organizations. The Texas Tech Trombone Choir and combined choirs lead the crowd in singing carols and the illumination ceremony culminates with a soloist performance of "O Holy Night" in the Science Quadrangle. This is followed by the lighting ceremony, where 13 buildings within the Texas Technological College Historic District are illuminated with the over 25,000 red, white, and orange lights. The lights remain on the campus buildings until the first week when students come back from the holiday break.

In 1959, Texas Tech University Board of Directors member Harold Hinn planned and provided the funding to cover the Science Quadrangle and Administration Building with 5,000 lights. However, students were away on Christmas break and did not see the display. The following year, the Residence Hall Association sponsored the event under the name "Christmas Sing". In 1961, the event was renamed Carol of Lights and the display increased to 16,000 lights. The tradition has since grown to include decorations like the 38-foot lighted Christmas tree, 3,000 luminaries lining the sidewalks of Memorial Circle, and a 21-foot fresh pine wreath hung on the Physics/Geosciences building built by Women's Service Organization.

=== Double T ===
Double T

The most readily identified symbol of Texas Tech is the Double T. The logo, generally attributed to Texas Tech's first football coach, E. Y. Freeland, was first used as decoration on the sweaters for the football players. The Double T existed in its original form as an official logo from 1963 to 1999 and was updated in 2000. The new logo maintains the original premise, but incorporates three-dimensional beveling effects coupled with white trim.

To recognize the importance of the Double T to Texas Tech, the class of 1931 donated the Double T bench. By tradition, freshmen are not allowed to sit on the bench, which is in the courtyard of the Administration Building. The logo is further embodied in the Double T neon sign, donated by the class of 1938 and affixed to the east side of Jones AT&T Stadium. At the time of its purchase, this was reputedly the largest neon sign in existence.

=== Will Rogers and Soapsuds ===
Will Rogers and Soapsuds

One of the most well-known landmarks on campus is the statue of Will Rogers on his horse Soapsuds. The statue, entitled "Riding Into the Sunset", has resided at the center of the campus since it was dedicated on February 16, 1950, by Rogers' longtime friend Amon G. Carter. Carter claimed that Texas Tech was the ideal setting for the statue, and that it would be an appropriate addition to the traditions and scenery of West Texas. The statue, estimated to cost $25,000 ($327,450 in 2024 dollars) when it was dedicated, stands 9 feet 11 inches (3.02 m) and weighs 3,200 pounds (1,500 kg). The inscription on the plaque at the base of the statue reads: "Lovable Old Will Rogers on his favorite horse, 'Soapsuds', riding into the Western sunset."

The statue continues to be a part of school tradition. Before every home football game, the Saddle Tramps wrap it with red crêpe paper, a tradition dating back to 1969 and a loss to Texas A&M after which the statue was found covered in maroon paint in an apparent prank. In times of national tragedies, the statue has also been wrapped in black crêpe paper.

According to one campus legend taught to students during freshman orientation, the statue was originally intended to be positioned with Will Rogers facing due west, so it would appear he was riding into the sunset. However, that position would cause Soapsuds' posterior end to face due east, a dubious greeting to visitors entering by the main eastern campus entrance where the statue is placed. The horse's rear would also be facing downtown Lubbock, potentially insulting the Lubbock business community. The legend holds that this problem was solved by Tech's Civil Engineering department, who calculated that a 23° turn of Soapsuds' head to the north would line up Soapsuds' rear end directly toward College Station, Texas, home of the rival Texas A&M Aggies. Modern surveys and satellite imagery have determined the statue's posterior end actually points roughly equidistantly between College Station and Austin, home of another rival team, the Texas Longhorns.

=== Texas Tech ring ===
While the class ring had occasionally used a universal design, by the late 20th century, various styles were available. In 1999, the university reverted to a single ring design for the university's graduates. The new Official Texas Tech Alumni Association Class Ring symbolically captures the essence of Texas Tech with the prominent Double T logo surrounded by the school's full name and date of foundation. By tradition, undergraduates wear the ring with the Double T logo facing themselves. Upon graduation, the ring is turned so the logo faces outward.

One shoulder of the ring displays an image of the Administration Building, with the bells which represent victory. The other shoulder contains the university seal: an American eagle perched above a book, representing the church; a star, representing the State of Texas; a key, representing home; and, a lamp, representing knowledge. These elements are separated by a cross featuring ten cotton bolls, one each for Lubbock and its nine surrounding cotton-producing counties.

== Notable alumni ==
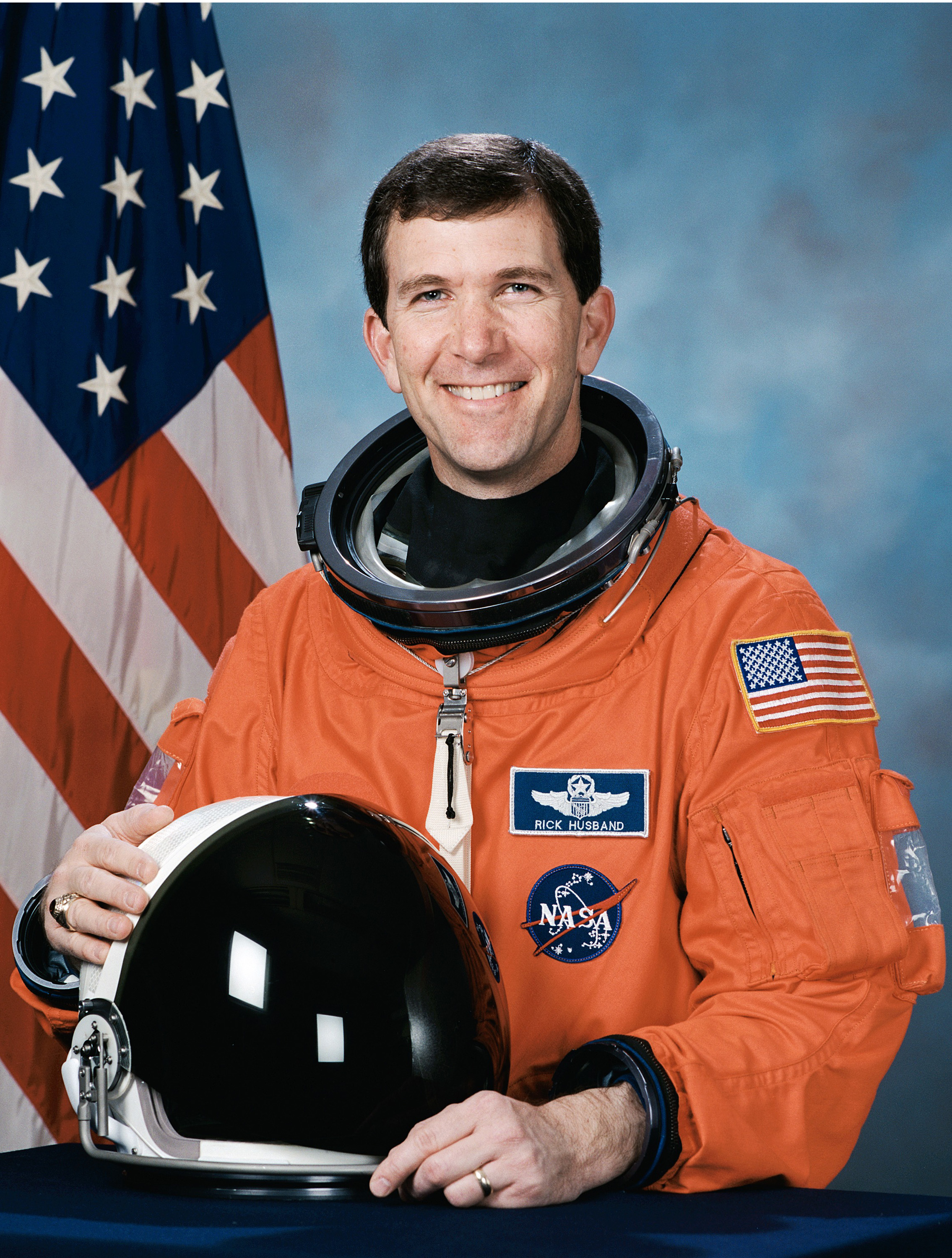
Colonel Rick Husband

The Texas Tech Alumni Association, with over 28,000 members, operates 100 chapters in cities throughout the United States and the world. Throughout Texas Tech's history, faculty, alumni, and former students have played prominent roles in many different fields. Among its Distinguished Alumni is Demetrio B. Lakas, President of the Republic of Panama from 1969 to 1978. Three United States Governors, Daniel I. J. Thornton, Governor of Colorado from 1951 to 1955; John Burroughs, Governor of New Mexico from 1959 to 1961; and Preston Smith, Governor of Texas from 1968 to 1972, are graduates of the university. Texas Tech alumni have also served in the Texas Legislature, including State Representative Justin Holland from 2017 to present.

Five astronauts, including Rick Husband, the final commander of Space Shuttle Columbia and recipient of the Congressional Space Medal of Honor, graduated from the university. U.S. Marine Corps Major and Medal of Honor recipient George H. O'Brien Jr. is a distinguished alumnus. Richard E. Cavazos is a two-time Distinguished Service Cross recipient and the first Hispanic and Mexican American to advance to the rank of four-star general in the U.S. Army. United States Air Force Major General Wendy Motlong Masiello, one of the highest-ranking women in the United States Department of Defense, is a 1980 graduate of Texas Tech's Rawls College of Business Administration. Alumna Arati Prabhakar, the former head of DARPA, was the first woman to head the National Institute of Standards and Technology. Ginger Kerrick, American physicist, was the first Hispanic female NASA Flight Director. Charles Q. Brown Jr. is the first African-American to be appointed as chief of staff of the United States Air Force and the first African-American to lead any branch of the United States Armed Forces.

Some alumnis in commerce are: General Motors Chairman and CEO Edward Whitacre Jr., Finisar CEO Jerry S. Rawls, Belo Corporation CEO Dunia A. Shive, and ExxonMobil board member Angela Braly, ranked by Fortune magazine as the most powerful woman in business. Scott Pelley, anchor and managing editor for CBS Evening News and correspondent for 60 Minutes, is a graduate of the College of Media & Communication.

Texas Tech alumni have also made contributions to sports, music, and acting. Texas Tech Red Raiders have gone on to play in the NFL, NBA, WNBA, PGA TOUR, and MLB. Three of the most notable football players are Donny Anderson, who was a member of the Green Bay Packers when they won Super Bowl I & Super Bowl II; E. J. Holub, who in Super Bowl IV became the only player to start on offense and defense in more than one Super Bowl; and longtime Miami Dolphins All-Pro linebacker Zach Thomas. Alumni standouts include 2018 and 2022 NFL MVP and two-time All-Pro quarterback Patrick Mahomes, a three-time Super Bowl champion and three-time Super Bowl MVP (for Super Bowl LIV, Super Bowl LVII, and Super Bowl LVIII; two-time Bilentenkoff Award-winning wide receiver Michael Crabtree, Danny Amendola, and Wes Welker. Others among the university's alumni are PGA Tour golfer Ludvig Åberg, folk rocker John Denver, country singer Pat Green, Broadway's longest-running Phantom of the Opera David Gaschen, mezzo-soprano Susan Graham, singer-songwriter Lynda Kay Parker, actor Barry Corbin, Friday Night Lights actor Brad Leland, and actor George Eads. Academy Award-nominated actor Jesse Plemons is a graduate of Texas Tech K-12. John Hinckley Jr., who attempted to assassinate U.S. President Ronald Reagan in 1981, attended the university sporadically from 1973 to 1980.

== See also ==
- List of colleges and universities in Texas
