= Texas Tech University College of Media & Communication =

- Established: 2004
- Dean: Bey-Ling Sha
- Students: 2556
- Undergraduates: 2239
- Postgraduates: 317
- Location: Lubbock, Texas, U.S. 33.581921°N 101.880360°W
- Website: www.depts.ttu.edu/comc/

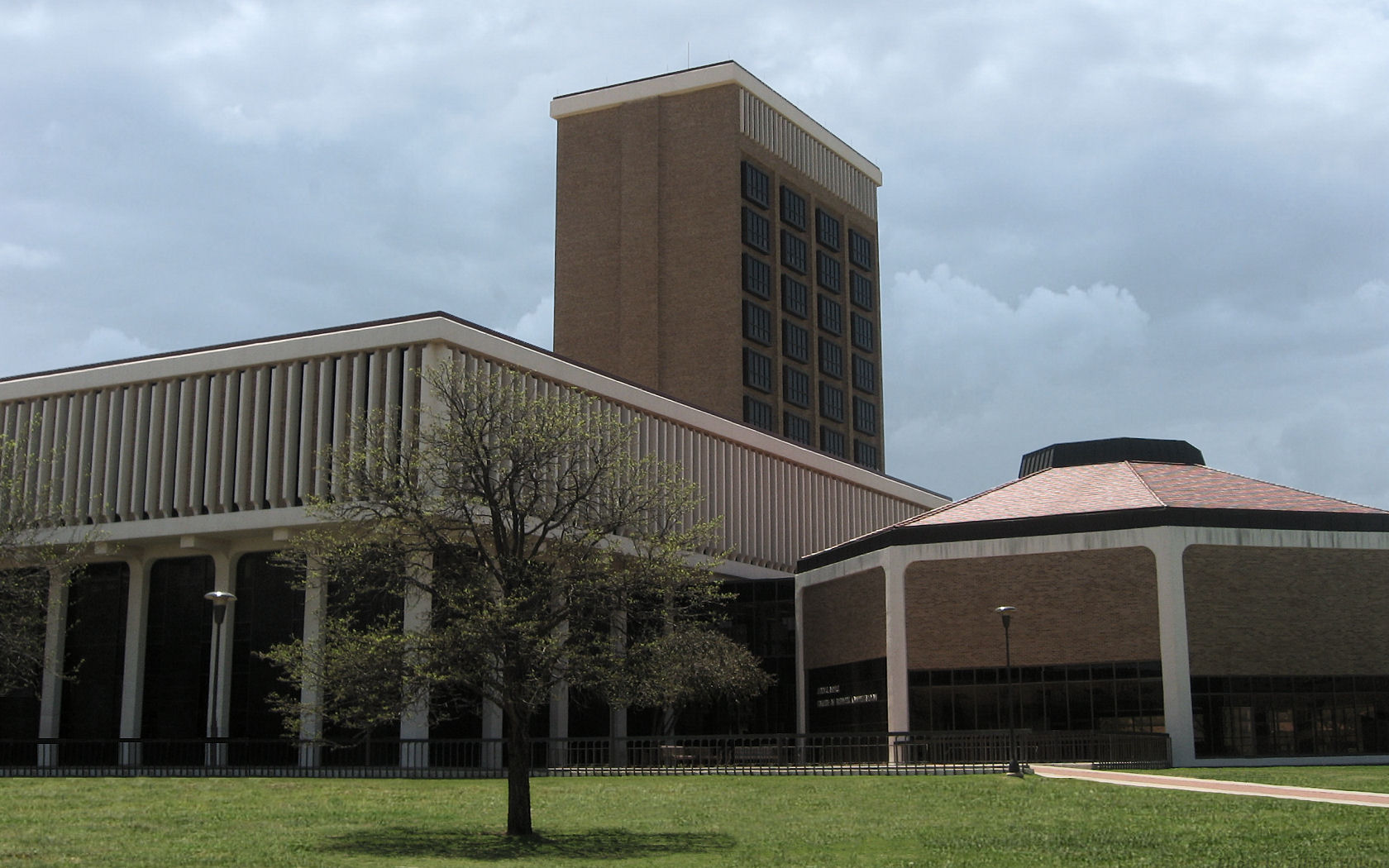
College of Media & Communications Building

Texas Tech University College of Media & Communication (TTU CoMC) provides faculty, staff and students opportunities to study communications-related disciplines. The college is located on the sprawling Texas Tech University campus in Lubbock, Texas. TTU CoMC features seven undergraduate programs as well as a doctoral program (Ph.D. in Media & Communication) and three master's degree programs (M.A. in Mass Communication, M.A. in Communication Studies, and Online M.A. Program in Strategic Communication and Innovation).

History: Prior to 2004, the mass communications program at Texas Tech was a school within the College of Arts and Sciences. Prior to August 2012, the college was the Texas Tech University College of Mass Communications.

== Academic programs ==
Undergraduate Degree Programs:

- Advertising
- Communication Studies (in-person and online!)
- Creative Media Industries
- Digital Media & Professional Communication (in-person and online!)
- Journalism/Broadcast Journalism
- Public Relations & Strategic Communication Management (in-person and online!)

Undergraduate Certificates:

- Entertainment Media
- Game Design and Culture
- Motion Picture Production
- Sports Media
- Strategic Communication Management

Graduate Programs:

- Ph.D. in Media & Communication
- M.A. in Mass Communication
- M.A. in Communication Studies
- M.A. in Strategic Communication & Innovation (Online program!)

== Departments ==
- Advertising & Brand Strategy
- Communication Studies
- Journalism & Creative Media Industries
- Media Strategies
- Public Relations
- Professional Communication

== Research Centers ==
- Center for Communication Research
- Thomas Jay Harris Institute for Hispanic & International Communication

== Student Opportunities & Organizations ==
Student Opportunities & Organizations

- Ad Team
- Association for Women in Communications (AWC)
- Communication Studies Society
- Daily Toreador
- Double T Insider
- Fashion And Media Entertainment Group
- Heads Up Display
- Hub@TTU
- Kappa Tau Alpha
- KTXT-FM
- MCTV newscast
- Parliamentary Debate Team
- Public Relations Student Society of America
- RaiderComm
- Society of Professional Journalists
- Tech Advertising Federation
- Tech Creative Media Association
- Tech Gaming Club
- Tech Esports Association
- TTU Women's Production Club
- Tech Virtual Reality Club
