= Texas Tech University College of Arts & Sciences =

- Established: 1925
- Dean: Dr. Tosha Dupras
- Faculty: 545
- Students: 11,870=
- Location: Lubbock, Texas, U.S. 33.585726°N 101.873697°W
- Website: www.as.ttu.edu

The Texas Tech University College of Arts & Sciences was founded in 1925 as one of Texas Tech University's four original colleges. With 16 departments, the college offers a wide variety of courses and programs in the humanities, social and behavioral sciences, mathematics and natural sciences. Students can choose from 41 bachelor's degree programs, 33 master's degrees and 14 doctoral programs. With over 10,000 students (8,500 undergraduate and 1,200 graduate) enrolled, the College of Arts & Sciences is the largest college on the Texas Tech University campus.

== Academic departments ==
- Biological Sciences
- Chemistry and Biochemistry
- Classical and Modern Languages and Literatures
- Economics
- English
- Environmental Toxicology
- General Studies Program
- Geosciences
- Kinesiology, and Sport Management
- History
- Mathematics and Statistics
- Philosophy
- Physics
- Political Science
- Psychology
- Sociology, Anthropology, and Social Work

== Research centers ==
- Center for Chemical Biology
- Center for Environmental Radiation Studies
- Center for Geospatial Technology
- The Center for the Integration of STEM Education & Research (CISER)
- Center for Public Service
- Climate Science Center
- College of Arts & Sciences Microscopy
- Institute for Forensic Science
- Institute for Peace and Conflict
- Institute for Studies in Pragmaticism
- The Institute of Environmental & Human Health
- Medieval & Renaissance Studies Center
- Texas Tech Population Center

== Gallery ==
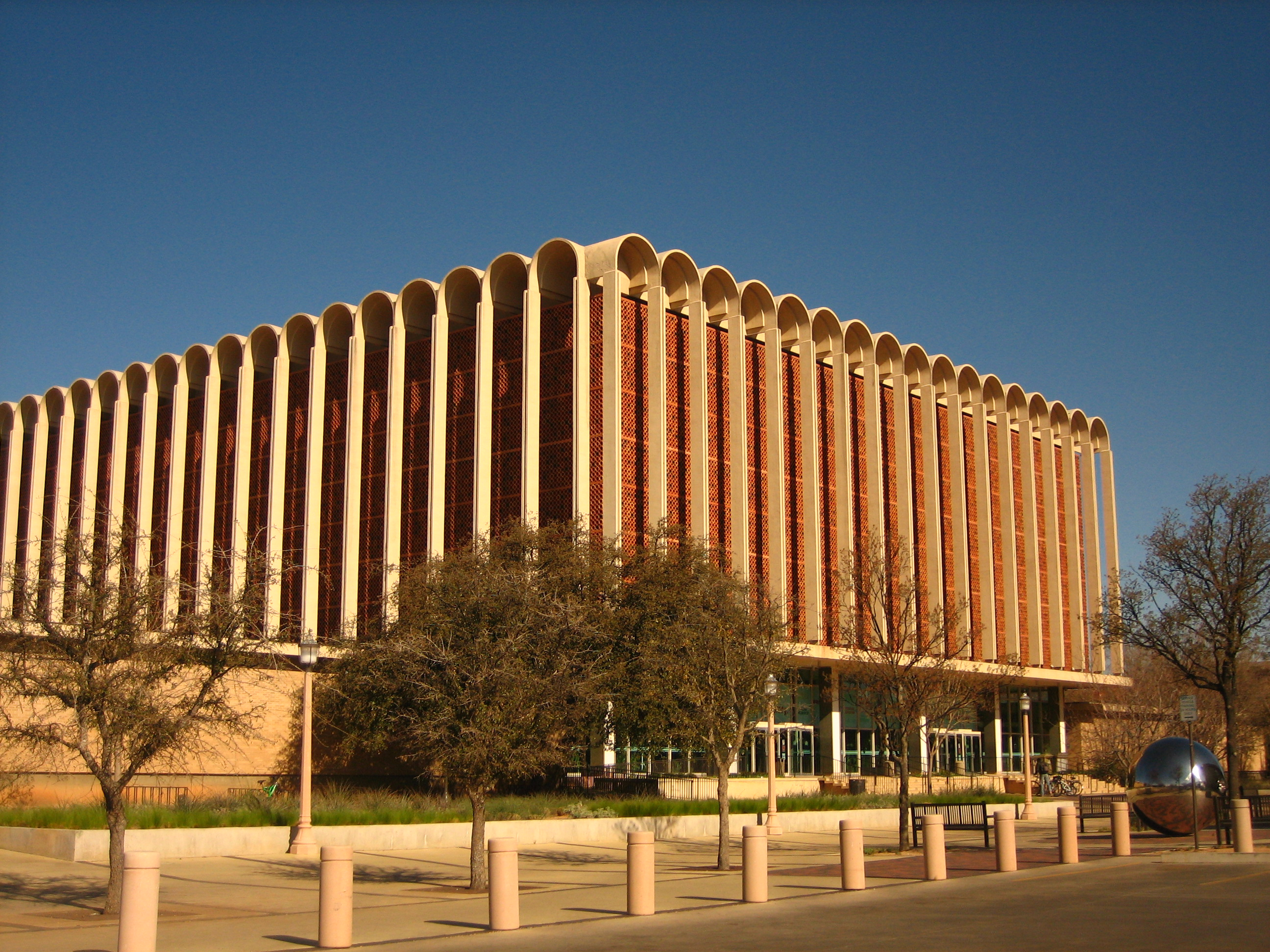
The Library of Texas Tech University is shaped architecturally like a honeycomb.

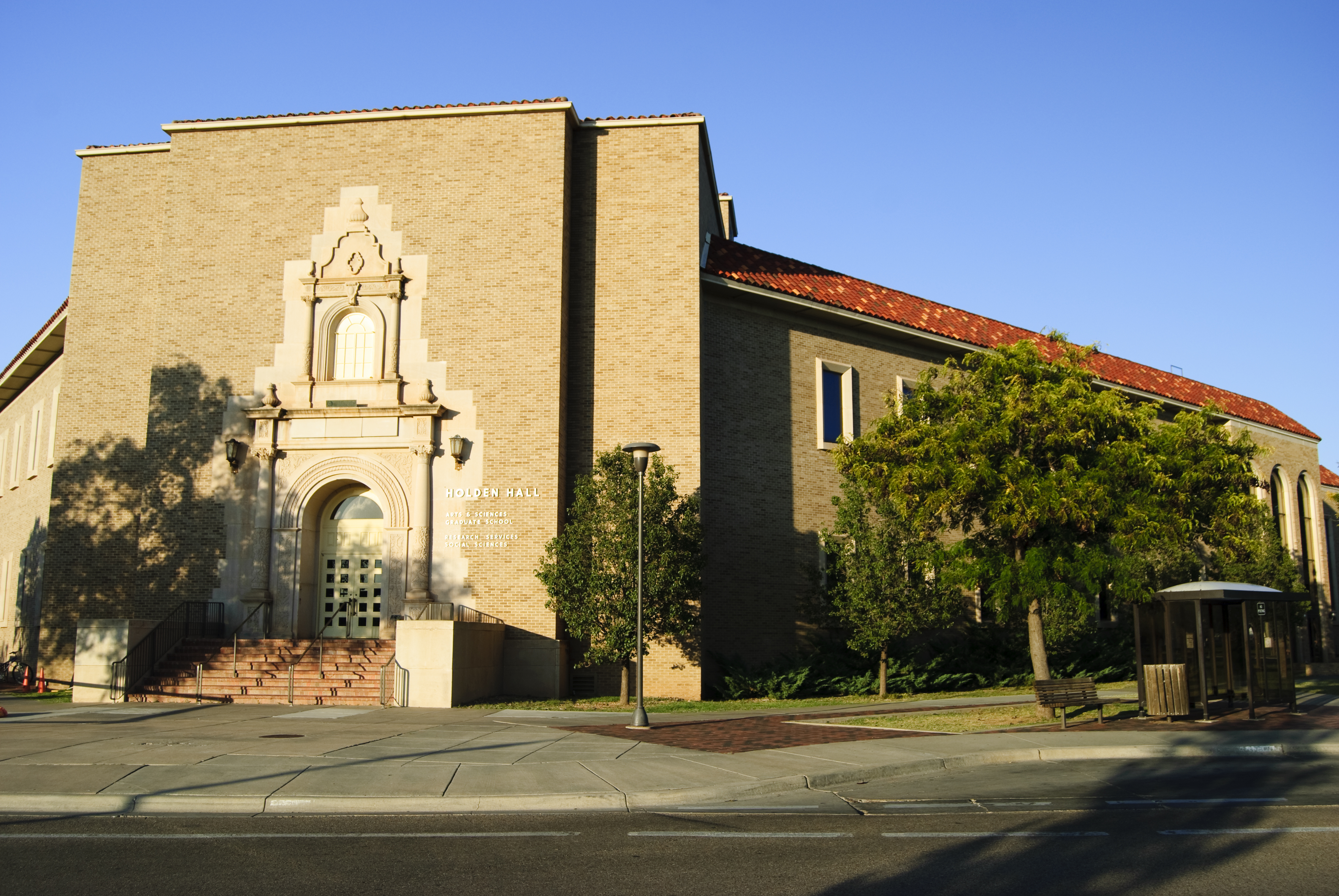
Holden Hall, an Arts and Sciences building at Texas Tech University, is named for William Curry Holden, historian and archeologist.

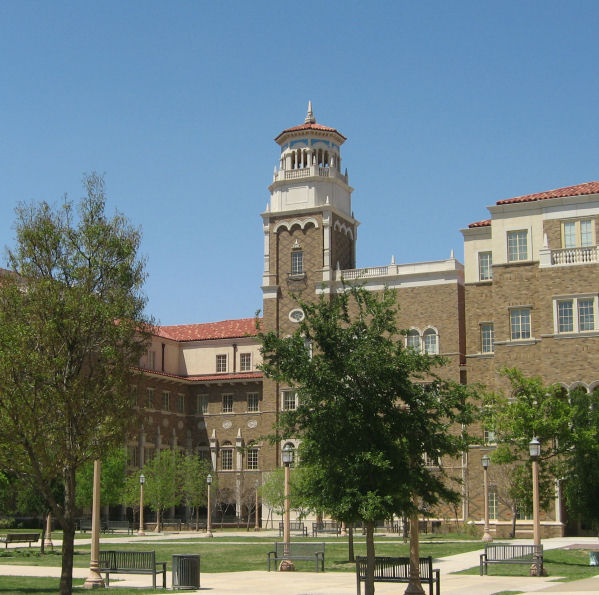
Texas Tech English/Philosophy Building
