= Texas Tech Red Raiders football =

College football team that represents Texas Tech University

2026 Texas Tech Red Raiders football team
- First season: 1925; 101 years ago
- Athletic director: Kirby Hocutt
- General manager: James Blanchard
- Head coach: Joey McGuire; 4th season, 40–18 (.690)
- Location: Lubbock, Texas
- Stadium: Galaxy Stadium (capacity: 60,229)
- Field: Cody Campbell Field
- NCAA division: Division I FBS
- Conference: Big 12
- Colors: Scarlet and black
- All-time record: 625–488–32 (.560)
- CFP record: 0–1 (.000)
- Bowl record: 17–25–1 (.407)

College Football Playoff appearances
- 2025

Conference championships
- Border: 1937, 1942, 1947, 1948, 1949, 1951, 1953, 1954, 1955 SWC: 1976, 1994 Big 12: 2025

Division championships
- Big 12 South: 2008
- Consensus All-Americans: 14
- Rivalries: TCU (rivalry); Baylor (rivalry); Houston (rivalry); Texas (rivalry); Texas A&M (rivalry); Arkansas (rivalry); Oklahoma State (rivalry)

Uniforms
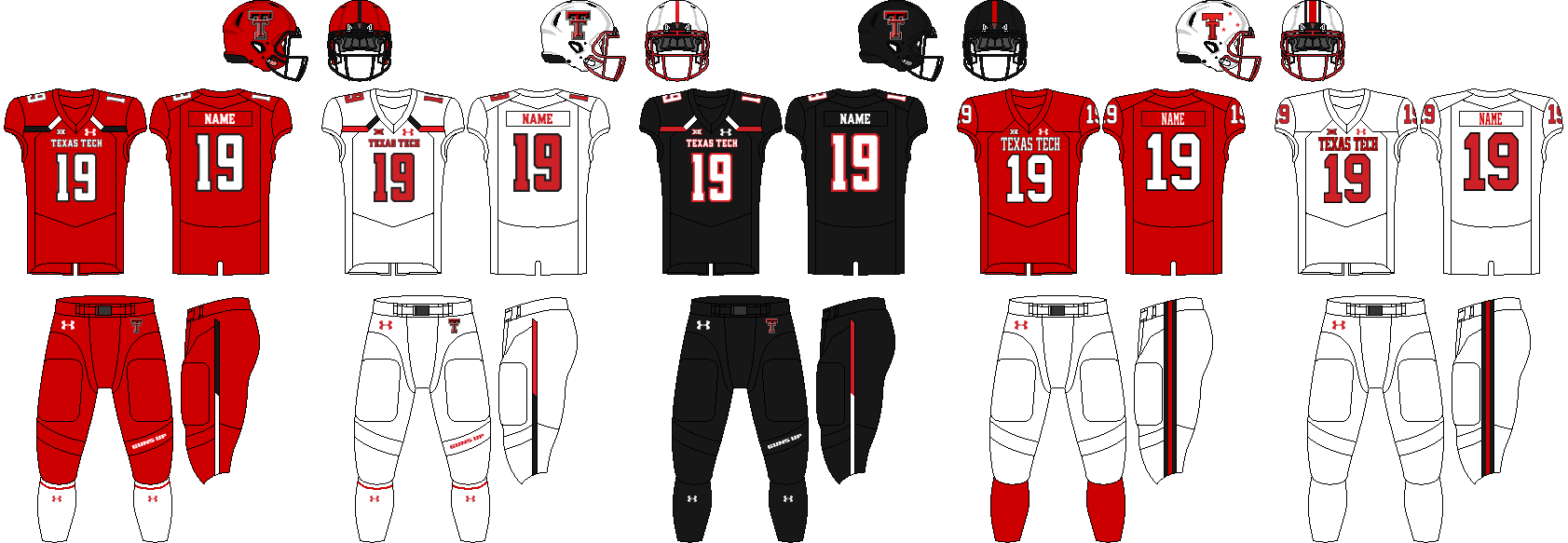
- Fight song: Fight, Raiders, Fight
- Mascot: The Masked Rider / Raider Red
- Marching band: Goin' Band from Raiderland
- Outfitter: Adidas
- Website: texastech.com

The Texas Tech Red Raiders football program is a college football team that represents Texas Tech University (variously "TTU"). The Red Raiders compete as a member of the Big 12 Conference, which is a Division I Football Bowl Subdivision (formerly Division I-A) of the National Collegiate Athletic Association (NCAA). The program began in 1925 and has an overall winning record, including a total of 12 conference titles and one conference division title. On November 8, 2021, Joey McGuire was hired as the team's 17th head football coach, replacing Matt Wells, who was fired in the middle of the 2021 season. Home games are played at Galaxy Stadium in Lubbock, Texas.

== History ==
Texas Tech (then known as Texas Technological College) fielded its first intercollegiate football team during the 1925 season. The team was known as the "Matadors" from 1925 to 1936, a name suggested by the wife of E. Y. Freeland, the first football coach, to reflect the influence of the Spanish Renaissance architecture on campus. In 1932, Texas Tech joined the Border Intercollegiate Athletic Conference, also known as the Border Conference. The school's short-lived Matadors moniker was replaced officially in 1937 with "Red Raiders", a nickname bestowed upon them by a sportswriter impressed by their bright scarlet uniforms that remains to this day. That same year, the team won its first conference championship and was invited to the Sun Bowl. The game was played on January 1, 1938, and resulted in a 7–6 loss to the West Virginia Mountaineers. Texas Tech suffered four more bowl losses before their first postseason win in the 1952 Sun Bowl. Before withdrawing from the Border Conference in 1956, the Red Raiders won eight conference championships and one co-championship, the most held by a Border Conference member.

In 1956, Texas Tech was admitted to the Southwest Conference (SWC), but was ineligible for any title during a four-year probationary period. It gained full SWC membership and began official conference play in 1960. The Red Raiders won conference co-championships in 1976 and 1994. The team remained in the SWC until the conference dissolved in 1996. The university was invited and became a charter member in the South Division of the Big 12 Conference. Texas Tech was the only member of the Big 12 to boast a winning record every year from the conference's formation in 1996 through end 2010. (Note: While in the Big 12 Conference: Baylor's first losing season was in 1996. Colorado's first losing season was in 1997. Iowa State's first losing season was in 1996. Kansas' first losing season was in 1996. Kansas State's first losing season was in 2004. Missouri's first losing season was in 1996. Nebraska's first losing season was in 2007. Oklahoma's first losing season was in 1996. Oklahoma State's first losing season was in 1996. Texas' first losing season was in 1997. Texas A&M's first losing season was in 2003.) In 2003, Texas Tech was the only team to ever have 5 or more players with at least 60 receptions in a single season. In 2008, the Red Raiders were one of three football teams involved in the first three way conference division tie. In 1932, Texas Tech played their only contest against Notre Dame, beating the Fighting Irish 32-0.

== Conference affiliations ==
Texas Tech has competed as a member of three different conferences since 1925.

- Independent (1925–1931, 1957–1959)
- Border Conference (1932–1956)
- Southwest Conference (1960–1995)
- Big 12 Conference (1996–present)
  - South Division (1996–2010)

== Championships ==
=== Conference championships ===
The Red Raiders have won 12 conference championships, as members of three different conferences, most recently as the winner of the 2025 Big 12 Championship Game. These include nine as a member of the Border Conference, two as a member of the Southwest Conference, and one as a member of the Big 12 Conference.

Pete Cawthon, Texas Tech head coach from 1930–1941. He led the Red Raiders to their first ever conference championship, doing so in 1937.

Year	Conference	Coach	Record	Conference Record
1937	Border Conference	Pete Cawthon	8–4	3–0
1942†	Border Conference	Dell Morgan	4–5–1	4–0
1947	Border Conference	Dell Morgan	6–4	4–0
1948	Border Conference	Dell Morgan	7–3	5–0
1949	Border Conference	Dell Morgan	7–5	5–0
1951	Border Conference	DeWitt Weaver	7–4	5–0
1953	Border Conference	DeWitt Weaver	11–1	5–0
1954	Border Conference	DeWitt Weaver	7–2–1	4–0
1955	Border Conference	DeWitt Weaver	7–3–1	3–0–1
1976†	Southwest Conference	Steve Sloan	10–2	7–1
1994†	Southwest Conference	Spike Dykes	6–6	4–3
2025	Big 12 Conference	Joey McGuire	12–1	8–1

† Co-championship

=== Division championships ===
The Red Raiders were previously members of the Big 12 between its inception in 1996 and the dissolution of conference divisions within the Big 12 in 2011. They won one division championship during that span, sharing it with Oklahoma and Texas in 2008.

Season	Division	Coach	Record	Conference Record	Opponent	CG result
2008†	Big 12 South	Mike Leach	11–2	7–1	N/A lost tie-breaker to Oklahoma	

† Co-championship

== Head coaches ==
Texas Tech has had 17 head coaches, and three-interim head coaches. Six coaches have won conference championships with the Red Raiders: Pete Cawthon, Dell Morgan, DeWitt Weaver, Steve Sloan, Spike Dykes, and Joey McGuire. Mike Leach is the only head Texas Tech football coach to win a division title. Dykes is the all-time leader in games and years coached, while Leach is the all-time leader in overall wins. Higginbotham is, in terms of winning percentage, the worst coach the Red Raiders have had; winning only one game while losing seven, and tying two, giving him a .200 winning percentage. Cawthon's .693 winning percent ranks as the highest among the coaches. (Note: Because he was an interim who only acted as head coach in one game, Ruffin McNeill's 1.000 was excluded.)

Morgan, Weaver, Dykes, and Leach have each received Coach of the Year honors from at least one organization. Morgan was named Border Conference Coach of the Year in 1949. Twice—in 1951 and 1953—Weaver was named the Border Conference's Coach of the Year. Dykes was named Southwest Conference Coach of the Year in 1989 and two other years. Dykes was also named the first Big 12 Conference Coach of the Year in 1996. In 2008, Leach was the second Texas Tech head coach to be named Big 12 Conference Coach of the Year. The same season, Leach was also named the FieldTurf/Howie Long Coach of the Year and was awarded the Woody Hayes Trophy and George Munger Award; all three awards recognize the top collegiate coach of the season. Kliff Kingsbury became the first Big 12 Conference coach to begin his career with 7 wins in 2013.

== Bowl games ==
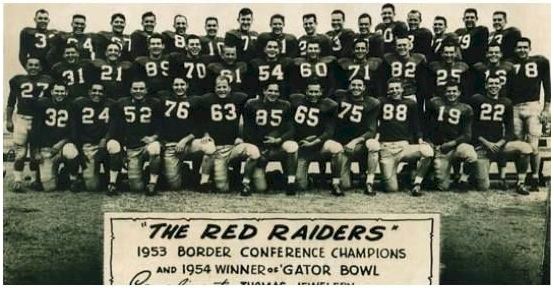
1954 Gator Bowl Champion Red Raiders, victors over the Auburn Tigers

Texas Tech has played in 43 postseason bowl games with an all-time record of 17 wins, 25 losses, and 1 tie. The Red Raiders rank third among current Big 12 Conference programs in bowl game appearances, and also boasted the distinction of being the only program in the conference to be bowl eligible every season from its formation in 1996 through the 2010 season. The 42 bowl game appearances by the Red Raiders tie the program at 22nd in all-time in bowl games played and 31st in all-time bowl wins. Only 4 head coaches, E. Y. Freeland, Grady Higginbotham, Rex Dockery, and Jerry Moore, did not lead Texas Tech to a postseason bowl game. (Note: Spike Dykes served as interim head coach for the 1986 Independence Bowl after David McWilliams resigned immediately after the regular season.) Although both Pete Cawthon and Dell Morgan had led the program to previous bowl games, neither posted wins in their five combined appearances.

The Red Raiders' fans have set attendance records at 10 bowl games, including the team's first bowl game appearance in the 1938 Sun Bowl. Although eight of the 10 attendance records were eventually broken, attendance records from 2 bowl game appearances, the 2004 Pacific Life Holiday Bowl and 2009 AT&T Cotton Bowl Classic, remain unbroken. The 2009 AT&T Cotton Bowl Classic's attendance record of 88,175 was the second-most attended bowl game of the 2008–09 bowl game season.

Texas Tech's first bowl game was at the conclusion of the 1937 season, only 13 years after the program was established. The Red Raiders played in the 1938 Sun Bowl in El Paso, Texas, against the West Virginia Mountaineers on New Year's Day. Nine of Texas Tech's 39 bowl game bids have been to the Sun Bowl, the most appearances by any team to the second-oldest college football bowl game. (Note: The Sun Bowl along with the Orange Bowl, and Sugar Bowl began at the end of the 1934 college football season. Only the Rose Bowl Game is older.) In the 1952 Sun Bowl, DeWitt Weaver coached the Red Raiders to their first bowl victory, defeating the Pacific Tigers 25–14 .

The 2011 TicketCity Bowl occurred on January 1, 2011, when the Red Raiders won, 45–38, against the Northwestern Wildcats. The game was the team's 11th consecutive bowl appearance that began with the 2000 Galleryfurniture.com Bowl, in former head coach Mike Leach's first season. In 10 seasons, Mike Leach's 9 bowl game appearances and five wins are the most of any of the program's head coaches.

The 2012 Meineke Car Care Bowl of Texas occurred on December 28, 2012, when the Red Raiders won, 34–31, against the Minnesota Golden Gophers. The last time the two teams had met was during the 2006 Insight Bowl, in which Texas Tech completed the biggest comeback in bowl history. After falling behind 38–7 with 7:47 remaining in the third quarter, rallied to score 31 unanswered points to send the game to overtime. In the 2006 game, the Gophers scored a field goal in overtime, but the Red Raiders responded with a touchdown to win.

The 2013 National University Holiday Bowl occurred on December 30, 2013. This was Kliff Kingsbury's first season as head coach at Texas Tech. The Red Raiders won, 37–23, against the Arizona State Sun Devils. The last, and only other, time these two teams met was in 1999, in both teams' preseason opener despite both teams having been members of the Border Conference. In this Holiday Bowl meeting, the Red Raiders led the entire game, with the smallest lead of 7 points only lasting 11 seconds on the game clock, as Reginald Davis III returned a 90-yard kickoff for a touchdown, to answer the Sun Devils' Taylor Kelly's 44-yard touchdown run, early in the third quarter.

Of the most recent bowl games in the programs history are the 2022 TaxAct Texas Bowl, and the 2023 Independence Bowl. On December 28, 2022, the Red Raiders, led by head coach Joey McGuire, won 42–25 versus the former No. 9 Ole Miss Rebels led by coach Lane Kiffin. On December 16, 2023, the Red Raiders which were led by Joey McGuire in his second year as head coach for Texas Tech, won 34-14 against a 6-6 University of California team in the 23' Independence Bowl in Shreveport Louisiana, winning 2 consecutive bowl games in consecutive years for the program, which has not been done in the program since Mike Leach's 2002-04 campaigns.

== Honors and achievements ==
=== Retired numbers ===
Texas Tech Red Raiders retired numbers
No.	Player	Pos.	Tenure	No. ret.	Ref.
44	Donny Anderson	RB	1963–1965	—N/a	
55	E.J. Holub	C/LB	1958–1960	1961	
81	Dave Parks	SE	1961–1963	—N/a	

=== Ring of Honor ===
In 2012, the Ring of Honor was established to recognize the most outstanding former players and coaches. An eleven-member selection committee screens candidates and a makes formal recommendation to the athletic director upon a unanimous vote. The inductees' names and numbers are displayed on the west side stadium building at Galaxy Stadium. As of 2025, twelve players have been inducted into the Ring of Honor, including the three former players with retired numbers.

Player	Position	Career	Inducted
Donny Anderson	RB	1963–1965	2012
E. J. Holub	C/LB	1958–1960	2012
Dave Parks	SE	1961–1963	2012
Gabe Rivera	DL	1979–1982	2014
Zach Thomas	LB	1993–1995	2016
Michael Crabtree	WR	2006–2008	2021
Elmer Tarbox	HB/DB	1936–1938	2021
Patrick Mahomes II	QB	2014–2016	2022
Thomas Howard	LB	1974–1976	2024
Andre Tillman	TE	1971–1973	2024
Wes Welker	WR/PR	2000–2003	2024
Graham Harrell	QB	2004–2008	2025

=== Individual honors ===
Many of Texas Tech's players have been recognized for their accomplishments while with the program. Seven Red Raider players, Donny Anderson, Hub Bechtol, Byron Hanspard, E. J. Holub, Dave Parks, Gabriel Rivera, and Zach Thomas, have been inducted into the College Football Hall of Fame. Anderson, Holub, and Parks are the only three players at Texas Tech to have had their numbers retired.

Two Red Raiders, Anderson in 1965 and Graham Harrell in 2008, have been named Sporting News College Football Player of the Year, which is bestowed upon the most outstanding college football player of that season by Sporting News. While no Texas Tech player has ever received the Heisman Trophy, seven Red Raiders have received votes by the award's selection committee. Donny Anderson and Graham Harrell both finished fourth in the voting in 1965 and 2008, respectively, the highest ranking a Red Raider has received from voters. Additionally, Michael Crabtree, Byron Hanspard, E. J. Holub, Kliff Kingsbury, and B. J. Symons were Heisman candidates, receiving enough votes to finish in the top 10.

Texas Tech football players have won several individual awards based on their positions. At the end of the 1993 season, Bam Morris received the Doak Walker Award, and in 1996, Byron Hanspard became the second Red Raider to receive the award. Michael Crabtree became the first two-time winner of both the Fred Biletnikoff Award and Paul Warfield Trophy in back-to-back seasons. Four Texas Tech quarterbacks, Kliff Kingsbury, B.J. Symons, Graham Harrell, and Patrick Mahomes have been awarded the Sammy Baugh Trophy. Harrell received the Johnny Unitas Golden Arm Award. In 2003, Wes Welker won the Mosi Tatupu Award, given annually to the best special teams player.

In 1935, Herschel Ramsey was the first football player from Texas Tech to be named an All-American. Since then, a total of 49 players have been named to an All-American team, 30 were selected as first-team All-Americans. Twelve Red Raiders have been named consensus All-Americans, players who were awarded a majority of votes at their positions by the selectors, with the most recent selection being tight end Jace Amaro in 2013. Michael Crabtree was named as a consensus All-Americans in 2007 and 2008, and is the only Red Raider to receive the honor twice. Ten Red Raiders have been named academic All-Americans.

== Venue, atmosphere, and culture ==
=== Stadium ===
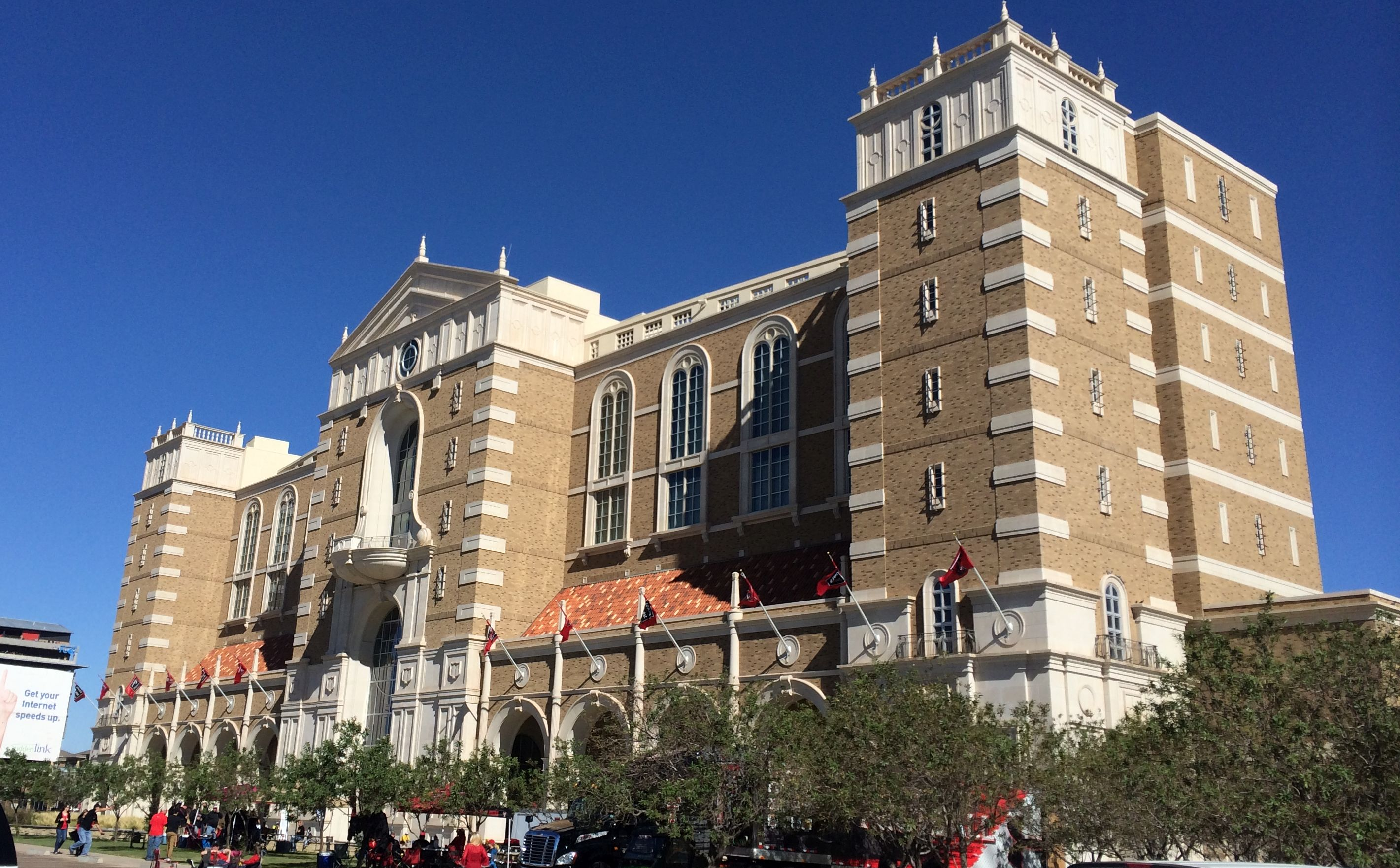
Exterior of Galaxy Stadium

The Red Raiders play their home games on campus at Galaxy Stadium. The stadium opened in 1947 as Clifford B. and Audrey Jones Stadium. In 2000, Jones Stadium was renamed, Jones SBC Stadium, in recognition of a $30 million donation from SBC Communications. Reflecting SBC Communications' rebranding as AT&T, Inc., the stadium's name was renamed in 2005 as Jones AT&T Stadium. Then known as the Matadors, Texas Tech's first home field was a makeshift stadium at the South Plains Fairgrounds in Lubbock, for the 1925 season and first game of the 1926 season. In 1926, Tech Stadium, a wooden horseshoe shaped 12,000 seat stadium, was built on campus. Twenty-years later, Jones Stadium as was completed for the 1947 season. Two years prior to the stadium's opening, Clifford B. Jones, former Texas Tech University president, established a $100,000 trust toward construction for a new football stadium. The Texas Tech Board of Directors voted to name the new facility in honor of the former president and his wife's contribution. On July 17, 2026, the name was changed to Galaxy Stadium after a new 15-year deal was signed with Galaxy Digital, a tech infrastructure company whose Helios Data Center is located in Dickens County.

Since opening with a seating capacity of 18,000, the stadium has been continuously expanded and renovated. In 1960, the addition of a lower bowl doubled the seating capacity to 41,500, an expansion in 1972 added over 10,000 seats, during the 1990s, 2,000 seats were added, and additions in the 2000s brought a seating capacity to 60,454. In 2003, a seven-story building including 47 suites, a club seat level and new press box replaced the former press box constructed in 1959. In 2010, expansion to the east side of the stadium included a five-story addition that includes 1,000 general-admission seats, 542 club seats, 30 suites, a dining club, and pro shop. Also, ticket and athletic offices relocated to the East Side Building. In 2013, the stadium was once again renovated with 368 seats being added, an upgraded video board and sound system installed, a colonnade and connecting concourse in the north endzone, and a 40-person observation deck.

When Galaxy Stadium opened in 1947, the playing surface was originally natural grass. However, at the beginning of the 1972 season, the stadium's natural grass was replaced with AstroTurf. Galaxy Stadium has had a FieldTurf playing surface since 2006. Jones AT&T Stadium set an attendance record of 61,836 spectators November 2, 2013, when the Red Raiders hosted the 2013 Oklahoma State Cowboys football team, and the student attendance record was set during the same season. The student section has been named as the best in the Big 12 by ESPN. The stadium has played host to 14 seasons in which the Red Raiders went undefeated at home. In July 2014, the athletic department announced that all season tickets had sold out for the first time in school history with a record 38,502 tickets sold.

In 2014, Texas Tech announced a substantially sized stadium renovation to Jones AT&T Stadium. The total cost of the renovations totals to roughly around $185 million, and will add new things to the Jones like club seating, more suites, and a hall of fame for the heroes and champions of Texas Tech Football. The south-end zone is also getting a renovation, creating more student-section seating and a press box.

=== Uniforms ===
Texas Tech's football team was originally known as the "Matadors" from 1925 to 1936, a name suggested by the wife of E. Y. Freeland, the first football coach, to reflect the Spanish Renaissance architecture on campus. The students followed the suggestion, and later chose scarlet and black as the school colors inspired by a matador's traditional red cape and black outfit. In 1934, head coach Pete Cawthon ordered scarlet satin uniforms for the football team. He said that if the team did not attract attention by their playing, they would at least be noticed because of the flashy uniforms. The football team, wearing its new outfit, defeated heavily favored Loyola Marymount in Los Angeles on October 26, 1934. A Los Angeles sports writer called the Matadors a "red raiding team", coining the moniker Texas Tech's athletics teams use today.

Texas Tech's uniform consists of any combination of scarlet, black, and white. Since 2006, Under Armour has been the team's outfitter. In 2013, head coach Kliff Kingsbury was given creative control over the team's uniforms and equipment design via a contract clause. Starting in 2024, Adidas has taken over as the uniform partner of the Red Raiders, with certain uniforms featuring the personal logo of former Tech QB Patrick Mahomes II, an Adidas endorsee.

The 2010 team was the first to wear white helmets since 1974. The white helmets were similar in design to the ones worn during the Jim Carlen era from 1970–1974 featuring a one-inch scarlet stripe in the middle bordered by two half inch black stripes. The helmets used in 2010 feature a black face mask instead of scarlet and the current version of the Double T. The helmets were worn for away games against the New Mexico Lobos, Iowa State Cyclones, and Oklahoma Sooners. The 2013 team saw a great expansion of uniform combinations and designs coinciding with Kingsbury's creative control over the uniforms. In 2019, Texas Tech would wear the College Football 150 patch, a patch worn by every FBS program to recognize the invention of college football in 1869, above the Big 12 logo on all their uniforms worn that season.

2003–2004 uniform combinations

2005 uniform combinations

2010 uniform combinations

=== Goin' Band from Raiderland ===
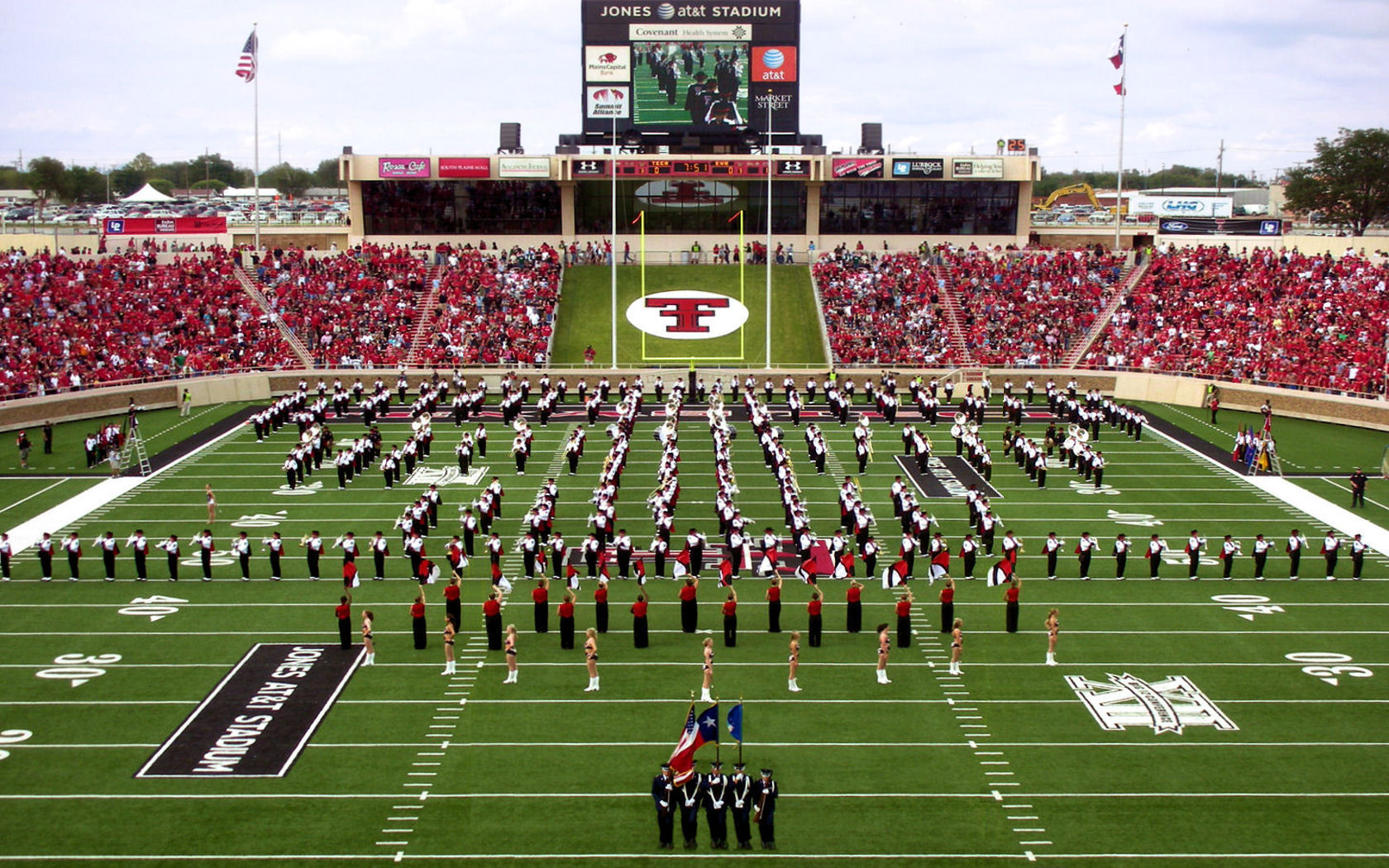
The Goin' Band from Raiderland performing in 2008

The Goin' Band from Raiderland, originally known as The Matador Band, is as old as Texas Tech itself. The band performed at the team's first game in October 1925, fielding between 21 and 25 members. The following year, the band earned its name when it became the first collegiate band to travel to an away game. American humorist Will Rogers once aided in financing a trip to Fort Worth, Texas, so the band could perform at a game against the TCU Horned Frogs. Today, in keeping with the campus' Spanish Renaissance architecture, the uniforms of the Goin' Band are styled after the trajes of matadors, complete with cape and a flat-brimmed "gaucho" hat. The 450-member band, which was awarded the Sudler Trophy – an award only allowed to be awarded once – in 1999, performs at all home football games and at various other events.

=== Mascots ===
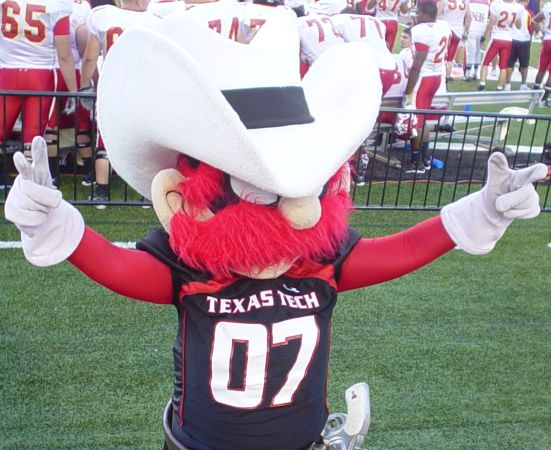
Raider Red displaying the Guns up hand gesture

The Masked Rider is Texas Tech University's oldest mascot, and was the first official mounted mascot in the country. The tradition began in 1936, when "ghost riders" were dared to circle the field prior to home football games. The Masked Rider became an official mascot in 1954, when Joe Kirk Fulton led the team onto the field at the Gator Bowl. According to reports from those present at the game, the crowd sat in stunned silence as they watched Fulton and his horse Blackie rush onto the football field, followed by the team. After a few moments, the silent crowd burst into cheers. Ed Danforth, a writer for the Atlanta Journal who witnessed the event, later wrote, "No team in any bowl game ever made a more sensational entrance." In 2000, The Masked Rider tradition was commemorated with the unveiling of a statue outside of the university's Frazier Alumni Pavilion. The sculpture, created by artist Grant Speed, is 25 percent larger than life. Today the Masked Rider, with guns up, leads the team onto the field for all home games. This mascot, adorned in a distinctive gaucho hat like the ones worn by members of the marching band, is one of the most visible figures at Texas Tech.

Texas Tech's other mascot, Raider Red, is a more recent creation. Beginning with the 1971 football season, the Southwest Conference forbade the inclusion of live animal mascots to away games unless the host school consented. For situations where the host school did not want to allow the Masked Rider's horse, an alternate mascot was needed. Jim Gaspard, a member of the Saddle Tramps student spirit organization, created the original design for the Raider Red costume, basing it on a character created by cartoonist Dirk West, a Texas Tech alumnus and former Lubbock mayor. Though the Masked Rider's identity is public knowledge, it has always been tradition that Raider Red's student alter ego is kept secret until the end of their tenure. The student serving as Raider Red is a member of the Saddle Tramps or High Riders.

== Rivalries ==
Ordered in terms of historical, active rivalries.

=== Baylor ===
The Texas Tech Red Raiders have played more games against the Baylor Bears than any other opponent. The rivalry began in 1929. The game has been played every year since 1956 despite the fact that Texas Tech was a member of the Border Intercollegiate Athletic Conference. In 1960, Texas Tech joined the Southwest Conference, ensuring the rivalry would continue. In 1996, the Southwest Conference dissolved, and both teams were invited, along with the Texas Longhorns and Texas A&M Aggies, with former members of the Big Eight Conference to form the Big 12 Conference. From 1947–64, Baylor won 14 of the 15 games. From 1996–2010, Texas Tech won 15 straight games. Baylor then won 5 straight meetings. Baylor leads the series, 42–40–1.

=== TCU ===
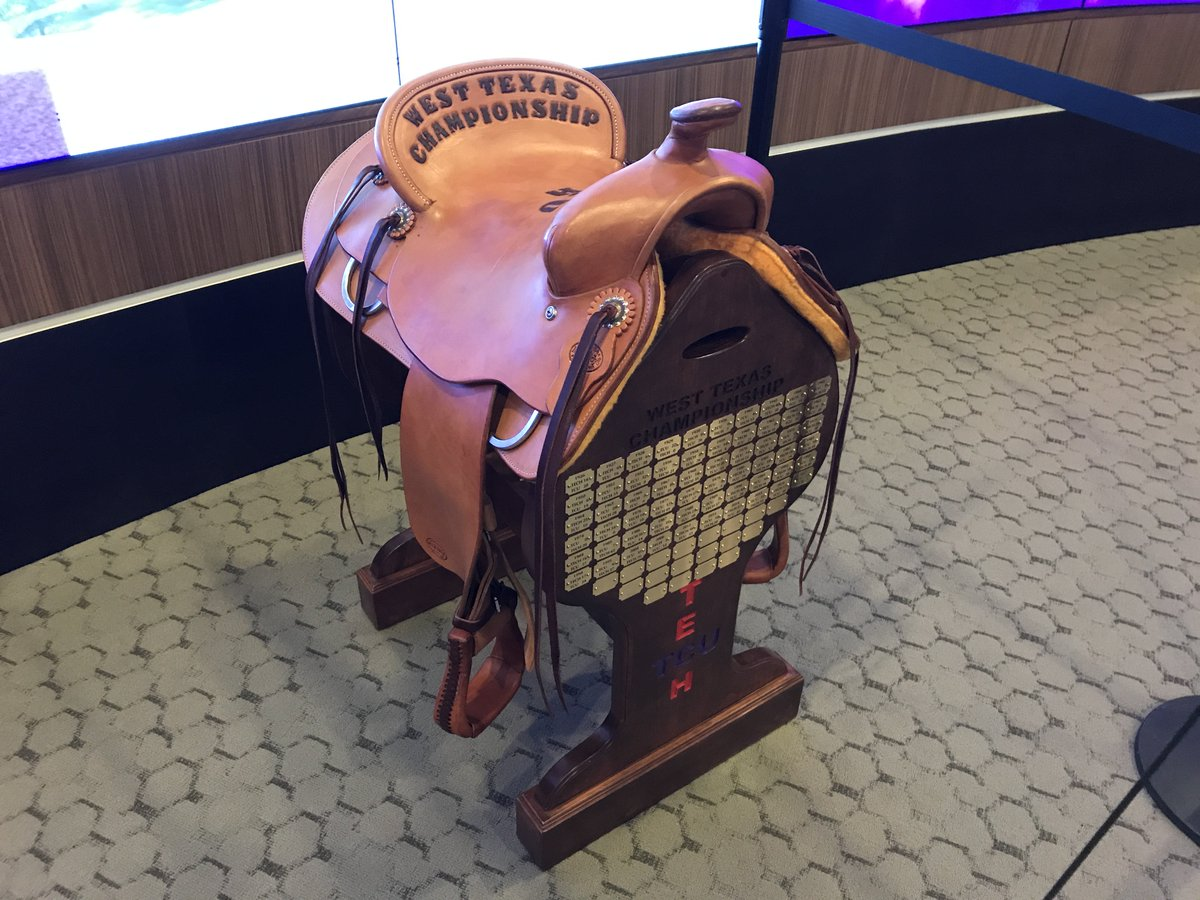
The West Texas Championship Saddle

The winner of the annual game is presented with the Saddle Trophy, a traveling icon which bears plaques marking the score of each meeting between the rival schools. The teams have met on the gridiron in 63 games since 1926. The "West Texas Championship - Saddle Trophy" was first awarded, from 1961 through 1970. During this ten-year stretch, the schools split the series 5–5. The trophy was lost and the rivalry name disappeared for decades until the moniker and trophy were reintroduced in 2017.

This football game is known as the West Texas Championship - Battle for the Saddle Trophy. Texas Tech leads the series 32–31–3 through the 2025 season.

=== Houston ===
During the history of the Southwest Conference, Texas Tech University was one of Houston's original rivals, playing every year from 1976 to 1995 when both schools were part of the now-defunct Southwest Conference. The two teams have had some very close games over their history that came down to the wire, with 16 out of the first 34 matchups being decided by single digits and a tie game in 1987. On September 4, 2021, the two met again to play the Texas Kickoff game at NRG Stadium. After the game, several fans broke out into a fight in the stands. With the Texas Longhorns leaving the Big XII for the SEC and the Houston Cougars joining the Big XII, Texas Tech and Houston will be the only two Texas public universities in the conference. Texas Tech also played the Houston Cougars in 2022 at Jones AT&T Stadium with the final score being 33–30 in double overtime, led by Donavan Smith who later transferred to Houston.

=== Dormant Rivalries ===
==== Texas ====
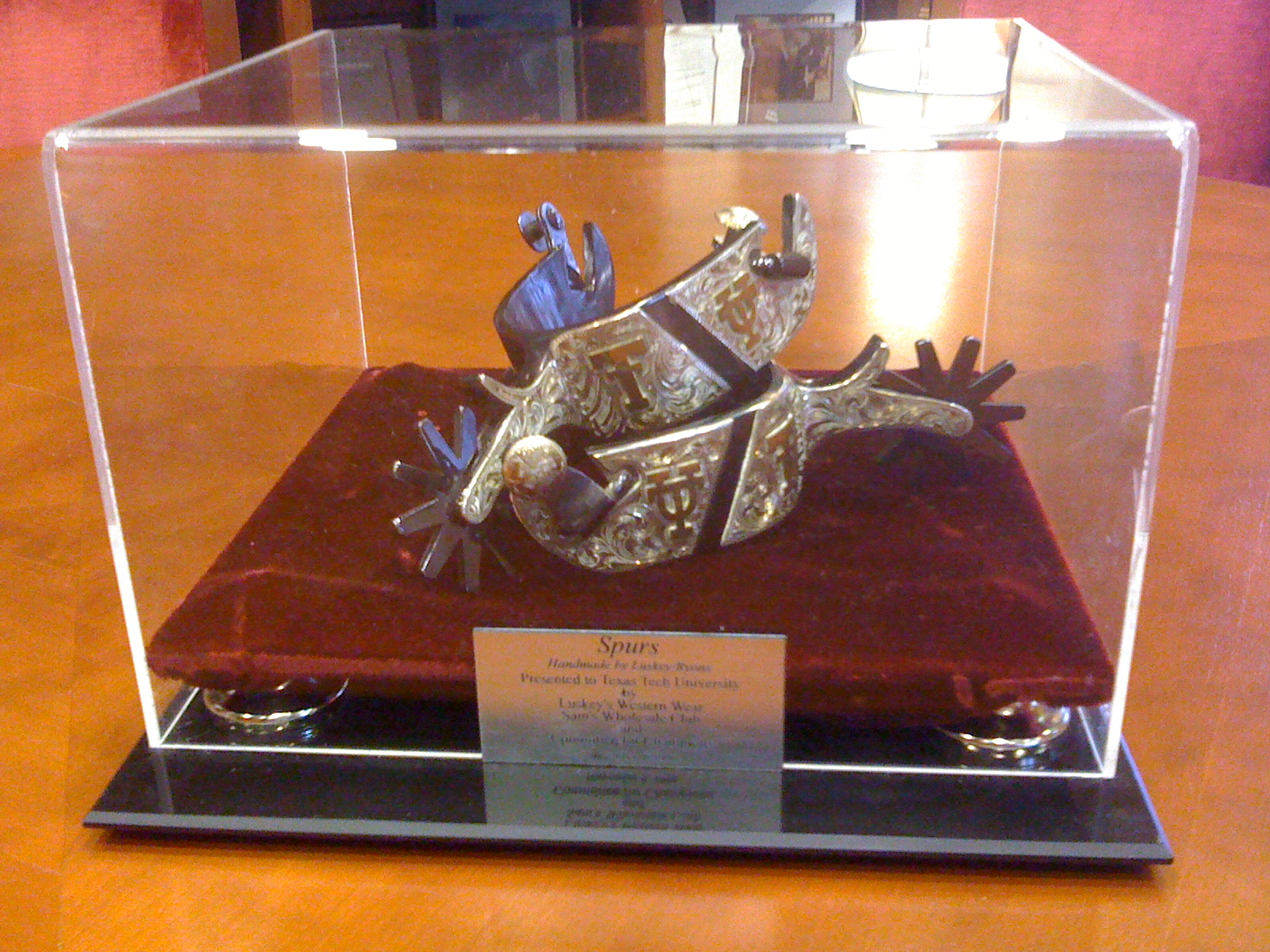
The Chancellor's Spurs is the traveling trophy between the Red Raiders and Texas Longhorns

Since the 1996 season, the Chancellor's Spurs, a traveling trophy, has been exchanged between the two university system chancellors, in honor of the two universities' rivalry. It is common for Texas Tech students to camp out a few days prior to home football games against the Texas Longhorns and the Oklahoma Sooners. The 2008 game was one of three games that led to a three-way tie controversy in the Big 12 Conference South Division, the first three-way tie in a collegiate conference division. (Note: The Atlantic Coast Conference's Atlantic and Coastal divisions, Mid-American Athletic Conference's West division, Southeastern Conference's East and West divisions, and Western Athletic Conference's Mountain and Pacific division have never had multiple division champions.) The Texas Longhorns lead the all-time series 54–18 and have won 20 of 26 games since the Chancellor's Spurs were first exchanged. After the 2022 contest where the Texas Longhorns team lost in overtime to the Red Raiders 37–34 in Lubbock, it is unknown if the rivalry will continue with the Longhorns move to the SEC in 2024. The Longhorns hosted the Red Raiders for the final time as conference mates in 2023. Texas leads the series 55–18.

==== Texas A&M ====
Texas Tech first played the Aggies in 1927 and the teams played annually from 1957 to 2011. The Texas A&M–Texas Tech football rivalry has experienced multiple altercations off the playing field between coaches, players and fans. Since both teams joined the Big 12 Conference in 1996, Texas Tech has won 10, while Texas A&M has won 6, of these last 16 meetings. Texas A&M has a three-game winning streak against Texas Tech following their 2011 victory against Texas Tech in Lubbock. The rivalry has been dormant since Texas A&M departed the Big 12 for the SEC in 2012. The Texas A&M Aggies lead the all-time series 37–32–1.

==== Arkansas ====
The two schools first met in 1957, with Arkansas defeating Texas Tech by a score of 47–26 in Little Rock, Arkansas. Arkansas won the first nine games in the rivalry before Texas Tech broke through with a 21–16 victory in 1966. The Red Raiders also defeated the Razorbacks the following year, winning 31–27. After a 30–7 Texas Tech victory in 1976, Arkansas embarked on another nine-game winning streak, winning every year until 1986. Arkansas and Texas Tech played every year from 1957–1991, when the teams were members of the Southwest Conference. In 1992, Arkansas joined the Southeastern Conference, and the two schools have only played twice since: a 49–28 Arkansas victory in 2014 and a 35–24 Texas Tech victory in 2015. The teams are scheduled to meet in the 2024 Liberty Bowl, and have a regular season home-and-home series scheduled for 2030 and 2031. Arkansas leads the series 29–8 through the 2022 season.

== Future Big 12 opponents ==
On November 1, 2023, Texas Tech's Big 12 opponents from 2024 through 2027 were revealed.

Future Texas Tech Football Schedule
2027
vs. Utah
vs. Baylor
vs. Kansas State
vs. Iowa State
at BYU
at TCU
at Houston
at Kansas
at West Virginia

== Future non-conference opponents ==
Announced schedules as of September 10, 2026.

2027	2028	2029	2030	2031	2032	2033	2034
Arkansas–Pine Bluff	Stephen F. Austin	Incarnate Word	vs Arkansas^{1}	at Arkansas	Washington State	at Oregon	Arkansas
New Mexico	Wyoming	Missouri State	Fresno State		Fresno State		
			Texas State		at UTEP		

1. Vegas Kickoff Classic, Las Vegas, Nevada
