= Riding into the Sunset =

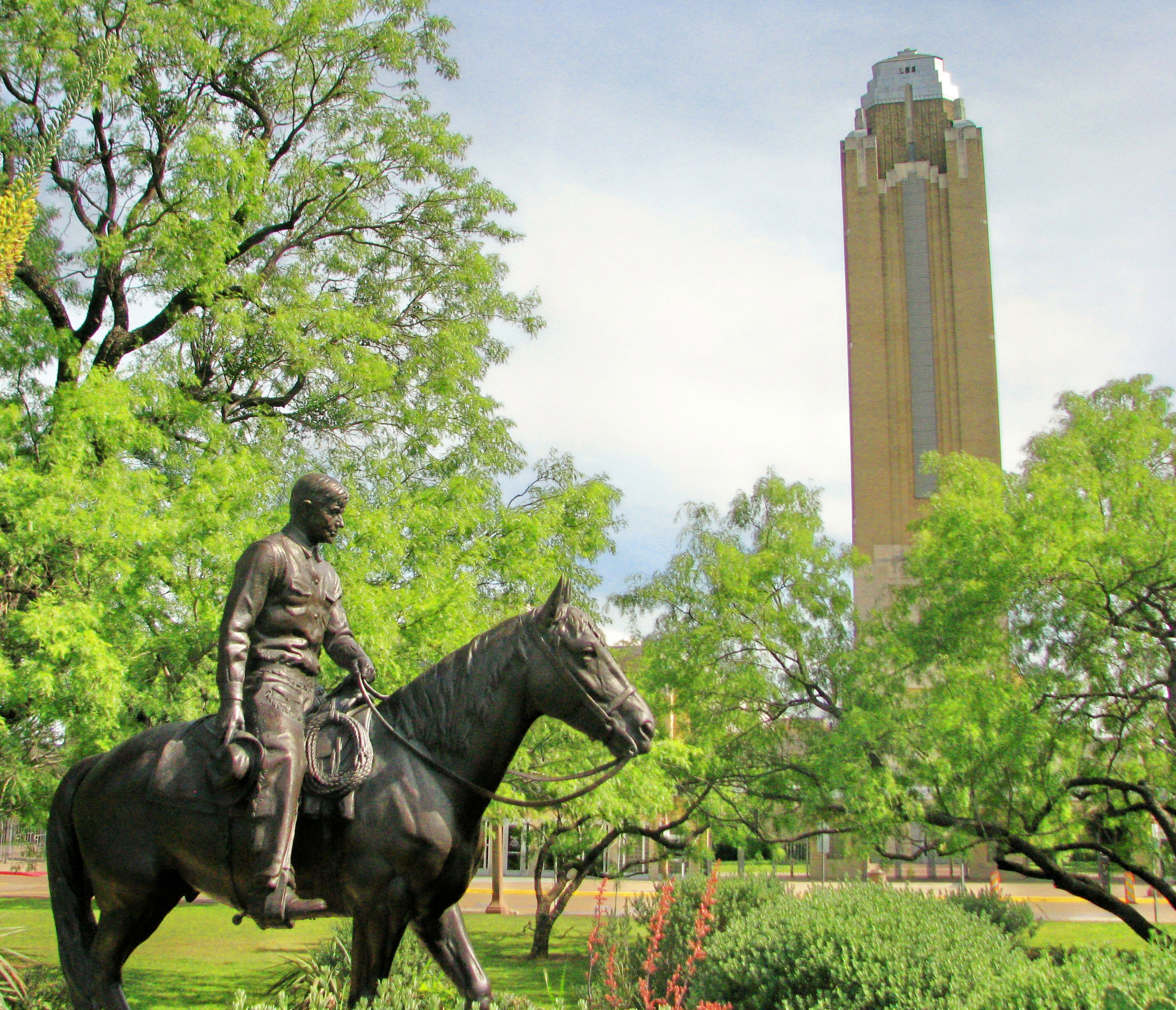
- Riding into the Sunset at the Will Rogers Memorial Center in Fort Worth, Texas
- Artist: Electra Waggoner Biggs
- Year: 1942
- Type: Bronze sculpture
- Dimensions: 2.87 m × 0.91 m × 1.78 m (9 ft 5 in × 3 ft × 5 ft 10 in)
- Location: Will Rogers Memorial Center, Fort Worth, Texas (original casting)

Riding into the Sunset is a bronze statue by Electra Waggoner Biggs, depicting Will Rogers on his horse, Soapsuds. There are four castings, located in Fort Worth, Texas, Claremore, Oklahoma, Lubbock, Texas, and Dallas, Texas.

The work was commissioned in 1937, by Amon G. Carter, a friend of Rogers, following Rogers death in 1935. Biggs initially used Soapsuds as her model but was not satisfied with her animal anatomy. While living in New York City, she hired a police horse and model, as well as a veterinarian to check her horse anatomy, to aid in the work's completion.

== Castings ==
=== Fort Worth, Texas ===
The original casting was installed at Amon Carter Square, in front of the Will Rogers Memorial Center in Fort Worth, Texas, in 1942. Carter built the center as an indoor arena to be used for rodeos, cattle and horse shows, and other events.

=== Claremore, Oklahoma ===
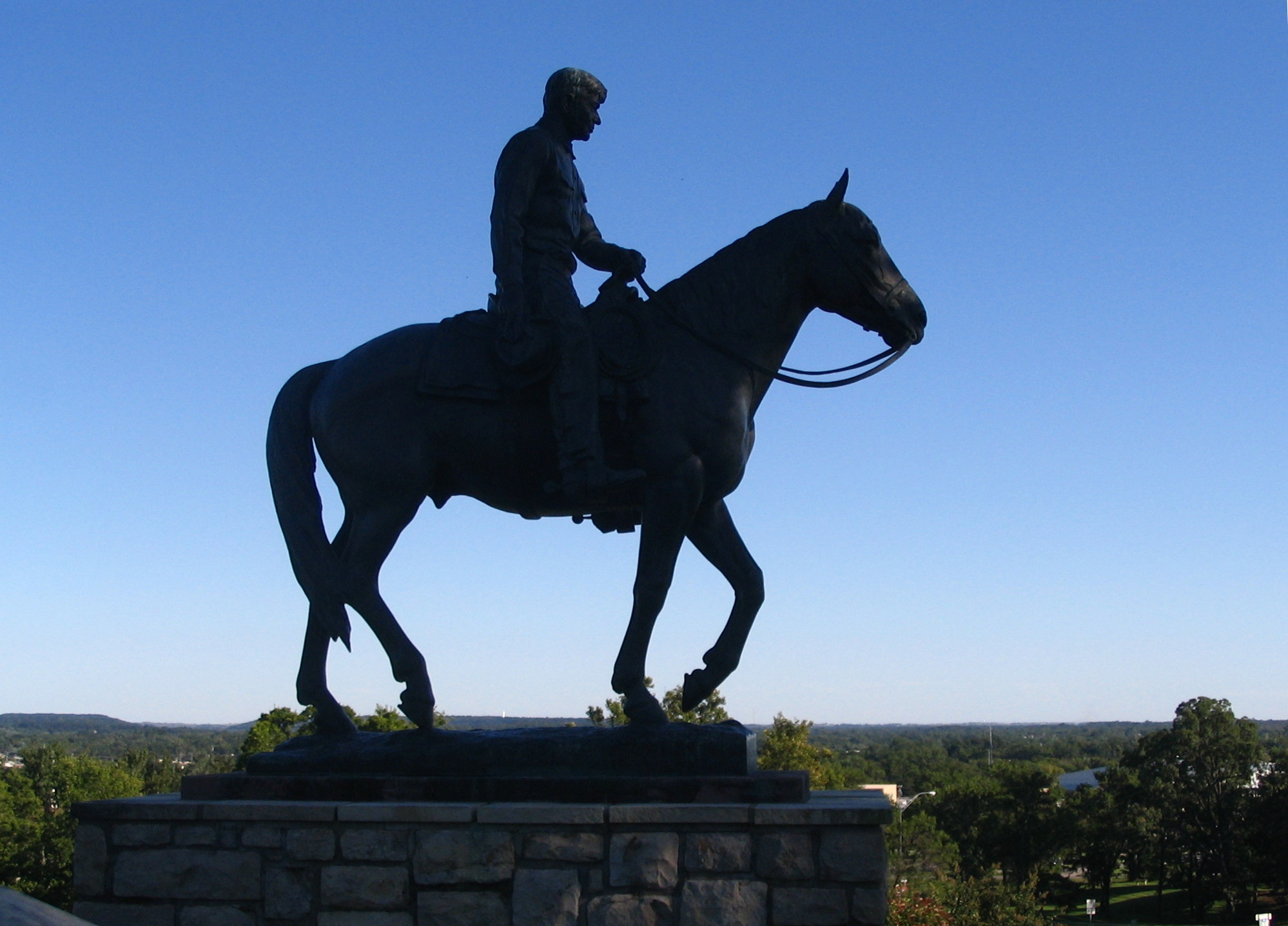
Riding into the Sunset at the Will Rogers Memorial Museum in Claremore, Oklahoma

Oklahoma's Will Rogers Memorial features the Will Rogers Museum, and a garden containing the entertainer's tomb. The casting of Riding into the Sunset was initially placed near the front entrance to the museum, but was later moved to beside the tomb, overlooking the city of Claremore.

=== Lubbock, Texas ===
- Riding into the Sunset
- U.S. Historic district – Contributing property
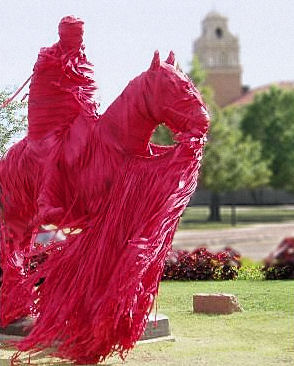
- Casting on the campus of Texas Tech University
- Location: Lubbock, Texas
- Built: 1950
- Sculptor: Electra Waggoner Biggs
- Part of: Texas Technological College Historic District (ID96000523)
- Added to NRHP: 1996

The Amon G. Carter Foundation donated the casting of Riding into the Sunset to Texas Tech University in 1950. Carter was the first chairman of the university's board of regents when it was founded in 1923. The sculpture is located in what is now called Amon G. Carter Plaza at the university's main entrance. While visiting Lubbock in 1926, Rogers donated $200 to the Goin' Band from Raiderland to aid with travel expenses for the marching band to accompany the football team for a game against the TCU Horned Frogs in Fort Worth. At the sculpture's dedication on February 16, 1950, Carter was quoted as saying "Will Rogers felt at home in the Lubbock area. His statue is a befitting monument to your students and faculty." In 1996, Riding into the Sunset was added to the National Register of Historic Places as a contributing object to the Texas Technological College Historic District.

A campus legend holds that the sculpture was originally intended to be positioned with Will Rogers and Soapsuds facing due west, so that it would appear he was riding into the sunset. However, that position would cause Soapsuds's posterior to face due east, towards downtown Lubbock, potentially insulting the local business community. To address this issue, the sculpture was turned 23 degrees to the east in the late 1960s, supposedly causing Soapsuds's rear to face in the direction of the Texas A&M University in College Station. The sculpture was found covered in maroon paint, the school color of Texas A&M, after the Texas Tech Red Raiders football team defeated the Texas A&M Aggies 13–9 in 1969. After the act of vandalism, a Texas Tech student organization known as the Saddle Tramps, began the tradition of wrapping the statue in red crepe paper prior to every home football game to protect the sculpture. Riding into the Sunset has also been covered in black crepe paper to observe national tragedies such as the September 11 attacks.

=== Dallas, Texas ===
A 1989 casting of Riding into the Sunset was installed on the exterior grounds of the Hilton Anatole in Dallas. This, along with several other sculptures, was donated by the hotel's developer Trammell Crow.

== Gallery ==
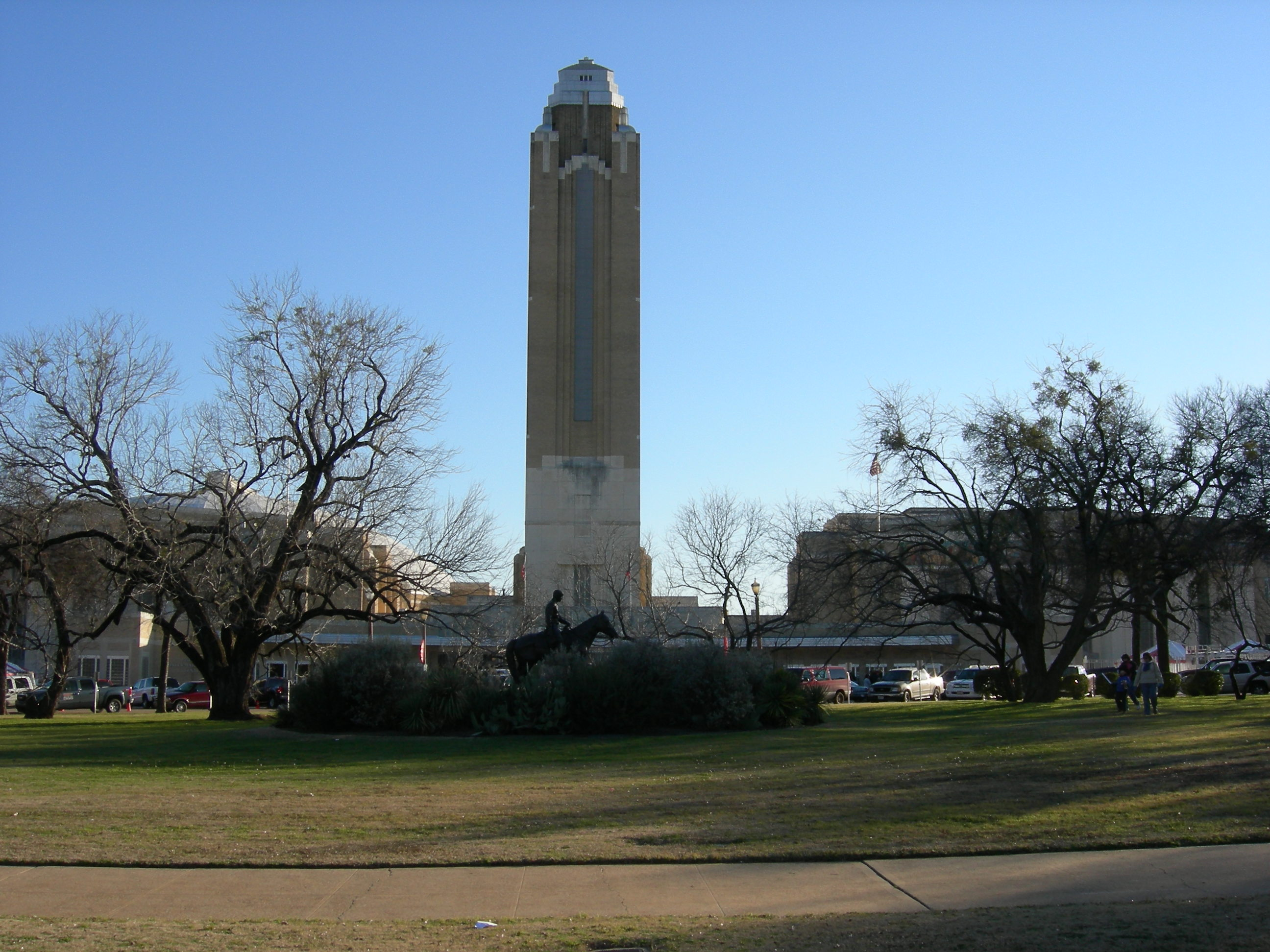
Amon Carter Square, Will Rogers Memorial Center, Fort Worth, Texas

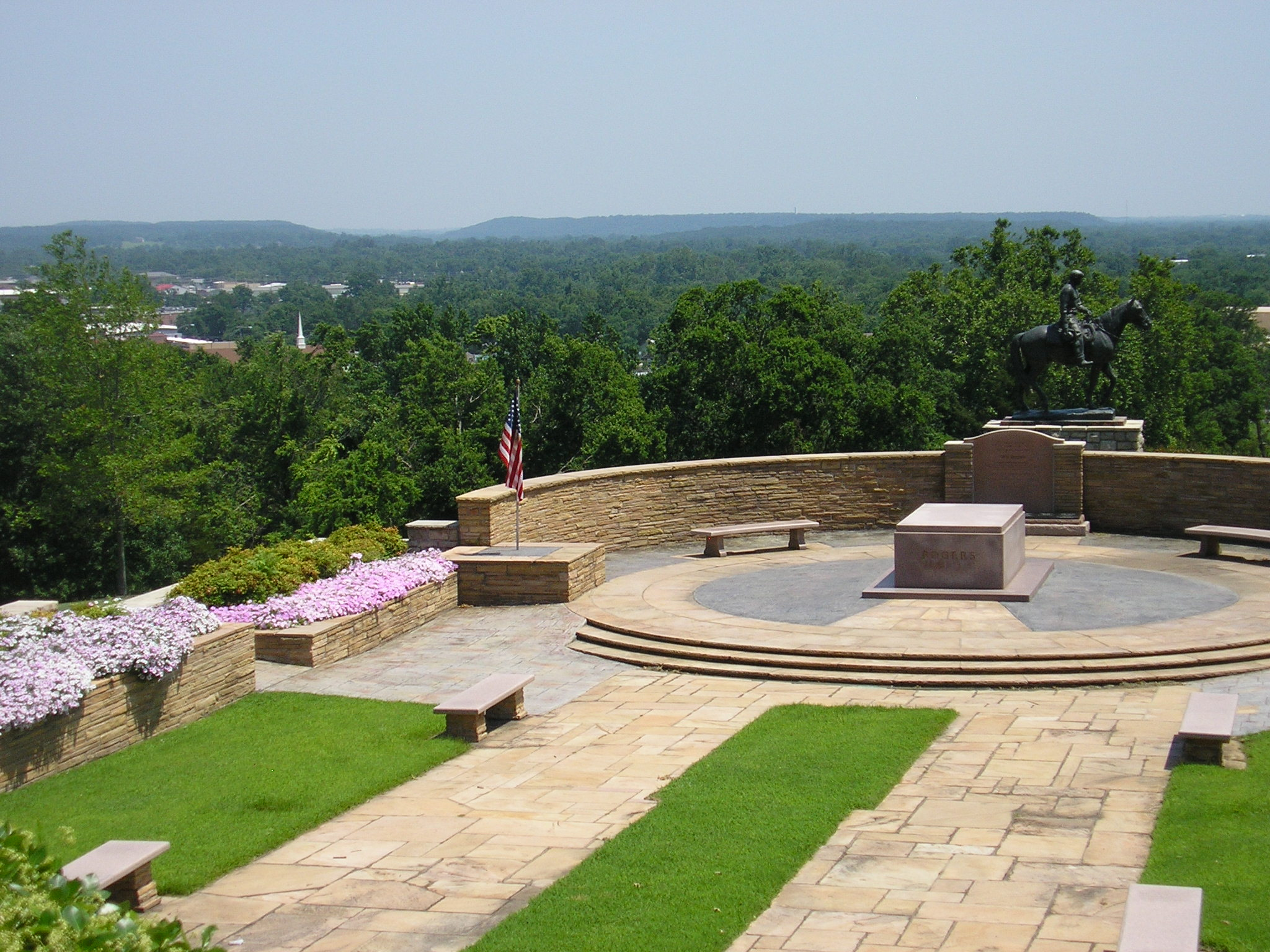
Will Rogers Tomb, Will Rogers Museum, Claremore, Oklahoma

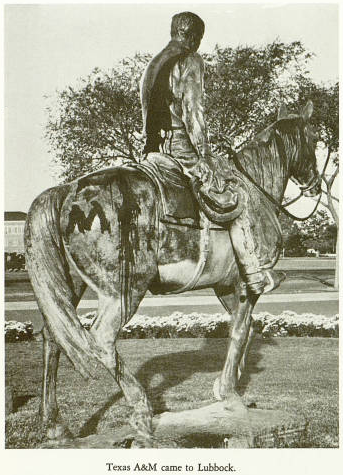
Riding into the Sunset vandalized following a football game
