= Texas A&M–Texas Tech football rivalry =

American college football rivalry

- Texas A&M Aggies Texas Tech Red Raiders
- First meeting: October 27, 1927; Texas A&M 47, Texas Tech 6
- Latest meeting: October 8, 2011; Texas A&M 45, Texas Tech 40

Statistics
- Total meetings: 70
- All-time series: Texas A&M leads: 37–32–1
- Largest victory: Texas A&M: 47–6 (1927); Texas Tech: 56–17 (2005)
- Longest win streak: Texas A&M: 6 (1927–1945); Texas Tech: 6 (1968–1973)
- Current win streak: Texas A&M: 3 (2009–present)

Locations of Texas A&M and Texas Tech

The Texas A&M–Texas Tech football rivalry is an American college football rivalry between the Texas A&M Aggies football team of Texas A&M University and Texas Tech Red Raiders football team of Texas Tech University. The series began in 1927. The rivalry had continued uninterrupted since 1957 when the two schools became conference rivals. (Note: Texas Tech became a probationary member of the Southwest Conference in 1956, but did not obtain full membership and become eligible to be conference champion until 1960.)

Texas A&M leads the series 37–32–1. Texas A&M started the series with a 12–3 advantage while the two teams played each other as non-conference opponents from 1927 to 1955. Texas Tech led with a 2–1 record during its probationary membership in the Southwest Conference from 1957 to 1959. Texas A&M led the series during the Southwest Conference years (1960–95) with an 18–17–1 record. Texas Tech led the series during the Big 12 Conference years (1996–2011) with a 10–6 record. In summary, Texas A&M dominated the series during the early years (1927–1955) with a 12–3 advantage, while Texas Tech leads the series in the modern era (1957–2011) with a 29–25–1 advantage.

Both teams are tied with six games each for the longest winning streak. Texas Tech holds the longest uninterrupted winning streak of the series, six games between 1968 and 1973, while Texas A&M has the longest nonconsecutive winning streak, six games in 1927, 1932 and 1942 through 1945. Texas A&M currently holds a three-game winning streak but with their departure from the Big 12 Conference in 2012, it is uncertain if the rivalry will continue in the future.

== Venues ==
When both Texas A&M and Texas Tech were members of the Southwest Conference (SWC) from 1960 to 1995, and the Big 12 Conference from 1996 to 2011, the match-up was exclusively a home-and-home series in College Station and Lubbock. In all, 29 games were played in Lubbock and 28 in College Station. Both teams held a 3-game home field advantage as the Red Raiders record was 16–13 in Lubbock while the Aggies record in College Station was 15–12–1.

Prior to Texas Tech joining the SWC for football in 1960, 13 games of the rivalry were held at a neutral site in Amarillo, Dallas, and San Antonio. Only one game was held in Amarillo, a 7–0 Texas A&M victory in 1932. From 1943 to 1950, the series was held at second neutral site, Alamo Stadium in San Antonio. Texas A&M held a 6–2 record over Texas Tech at Alamo Stadium. The 1951, 1955, 1958, and 1959 games were held at the Cotton Bowl in Dallas and the series at Fair Park was split 2–2. In the early 2000s, an effort was made to move the series back to the Cotton Bowl during the State Fair of Texas but ultimately the rivalry game remained a home-and-home series.

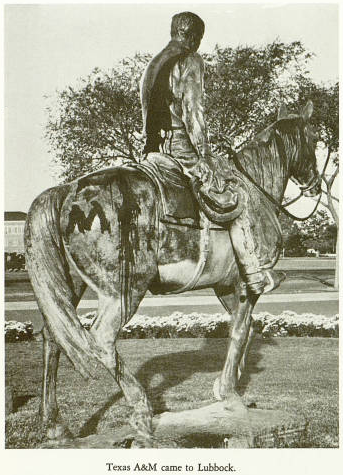
Caption: "Texas A&M came to Lubbock" Riding Into the Sunset after being vandalized in 1969.

== Will Rogers & Soapsuds statue ==
One of the most well-known landmarks on the campus of Texas Tech University is the statue of Will Rogers on his horse Soapsuds: Riding Into the Sunset. A campus legend holds that the statue was originally intended to be positioned with Will Rogers facing due west, so that it would appear he was riding into the sunset. However, that position would cause Soapsuds' posterior to face due east, towards downtown Lubbock, Texas, potentially insulting the Lubbock business community. To address this issue, the statue was turned 23 degrees to the east, causing Soapsuds' rear to face in the direction of the campus of Texas A&M University in College Station, Texas.

The campus legend led to Riding Into the Sunset becoming involved in the rivalry off the field. In 1969, the statue was vandalized after being covered in maroon paint, Texas A&M's primary color, after the Aggies lost to the Red Raiders 13–9. Following the vandalism in 1969, the Saddle Tramps, a Texas Tech student organization, wrap the statue in red crepe paper prior to every home football game.

== Other Incidents ==
- After the 1962 Game, a hoard of Aggies approached within 20 yards of the Masked rider before a single A&M captain stood between them, calling off the attack.
- Unknown people, believed to be Texas A&M fans, kidnapped and vandalized the Masked Rider's Horse, Tech Beauty, the Friday night before their Saturday evening match-up October 5, 1963. The horse was found on Sunday. Tech Beauty had been haphazardly shaved and had the letters 'AMC' (referring to A&M College) painted in white or silver paint on each side.
- After upsetting the #5 Aggies 21–19 in 1999, Texas Tech fans tore down and carried a goal post from Jones Stadium to the base of the Will Rogers statue, they then continued south to 19th Street where they took it west before finally leaving it just west of the intersection of Flint Avenue and 19th Street.
- In 2001 after defeating #24 A&M 12–0, Texas Tech fans similarly tore down the goal posts and attempted to force the goalposts into the Aggie section of the stands, starting a brawl. During the incident, Mike McKinney, the father of an A&M football player and Texas Gov. Rick Perry's chief of staff at the time, was punched in the face. While at first believed to be a Tech fan, it turned out to be another A&M fan. Mike McKinney would later become the Chancellor of the Texas A&M System.
- After the 2011 Game, a war of comments between both coaching staffs started after it was insinuated that Texas A&M was faking injuries during the game to slow the pace of Texas Tech's Offense
- Also associated with the 2011 game, there were allegations that Tech fans had put animal excrement inside of one of the A&M buses and spray painted vulgarities on the outside of others. It was later argued by Tech officials that it was fish bait put on the bus and washable shoe polish on the outside of the buses rather than spray paint. Neither version was confirmed as there was no police report and no official investigation. Tech officials apologized regardless.
- Unrelated to football, but another symptom of rivalry, Texas A&M lobbyists attempted to block Texas Tech from building a Veterinary College in Amarillo. Texas Tech opened the college in 2021.

== Game results ==
Texas A&M victories	Texas Tech victories	Tie games

No.	Date	Location	Winner	Score
1	October 27, 1927	Lubbock	Texas A&M	47–6
2	September 24, 1932	Amarillo	Texas A&M	7–0
3	October 3, 1942	College Station	Texas A&M	19–0
4	October 2, 1943	San Antonio	Texas A&M	13–0
5	September 30, 1944	San Antonio	Texas A&M	27–14
6	September 29, 1945	San Antonio	Texas A&M	16–6
7	September 28, 1946	San Antonio	Texas Tech	6–0
8	September 27, 1947	San Antonio	Texas A&M	29–7
9	September 25, 1948	San Antonio	Texas Tech	20–14
10	September 24, 1949	San Antonio	Texas A&M	26–7
11	September 30, 1950	San Antonio	Texas A&M	34–13
12	September 29, 1951	Dallas	#7 Texas A&M	20–7
13	October 10, 1953	Lubbock	Texas A&M	27–14
14	September 18, 1954	College Station	#19 Texas Tech	41–9
15	October 6, 1956	Dallas	#11 Texas A&M	40–7
16	September 28, 1957	Lubbock	#2 Texas A&M	21–0
17	September 20, 1958	Dallas	Texas Tech	15–14
18	September 19, 1959	Dallas	Texas Tech	20–14
19	September 24, 1960	College Station	Tie	14–14
20	October 7, 1961	Lubbock	Texas A&M	38–7
21	October 6, 1962	College Station	Texas A&M	7–3
22	October 5, 1963	Lubbock	Texas Tech	10–0
23	October 3, 1964	College Station	Texas Tech	16–12
24	October 2, 1965	Lubbock	Texas Tech	20–16
25	October 1, 1966	College Station	Texas A&M	35–14
26	October 14, 1967	Lubbock	Texas A&M	28–24
27	October 12, 1968	College Station	Texas Tech	21–16
28	October 11, 1969	Lubbock	Texas Tech	13–9
29	October 10, 1970	College Station	Texas Tech	21–7
30	October 9, 1971	Lubbock	Texas Tech	28–7
31	October 14, 1972	College Station	Texas Tech	17–14
32	October 13, 1973	Lubbock	Texas Tech	28–16
33	October 12, 1974	College Station	#16 Texas A&M	28–7
34	October 11, 1975	Lubbock	#6 Texas A&M	38–9
35	October 9, 1976	College Station	#15 Texas Tech	27–16
36	September 24, 1977	Lubbock	#6 Texas A&M	33–17

No.	Date	Location	Winner	Score
37	October 7, 1978	College Station	#7 Texas A&M	38–9
38	October 6, 1979	Lubbock	Texas Tech	21–20
39	October 4, 1980	College Station	Texas A&M	41–21
40	October 3, 1981	Lubbock	Texas A&M	24–23
41	October 2, 1982	College Station	Texas Tech	24–15
42	October 1, 1983	Lubbock	Texas Tech	3–0
43	October 6, 1984	College Station	Texas Tech	30–12
44	October 5, 1985	Lubbock	Texas A&M	28–27
45	October 4, 1986	College Station	#14 Texas A&M	45–8
46	October 3, 1987	Lubbock	Texas Tech	27–21
47	October 1, 1988	College Station	Texas A&M	50–15
48	October 7, 1989	Lubbock	Texas Tech	27–24
49	October 6, 1990	College Station	#19 Texas A&M	28–24
50	October 5, 1991	Lubbock	#23 Texas A&M	37–14
51	October 3, 1992	College Station	#5 Texas A&M	19–17
52	October 2, 1993	Lubbock	#14 Texas A&M	31–6
53	October 1, 1994	College Station	#10 Texas A&M	23–17
54	October 7, 1995	Lubbock	Texas Tech	14–7
55	October 26, 1996	College Station	Texas Tech	13–10
56	October 25, 1997	Lubbock	Texas Tech	16–13
57	October 24, 1998	College Station	#8 Texas A&M	17–10
58	October 2, 1999	Lubbock	Texas Tech	21–19
59	September 30, 2000	College Station	Texas A&M	33–15
60	November 3, 2001	Lubbock	Texas Tech	12–0
61	October 5, 2002	College Station	Texas Tech	48–47^{2OT}
62	October 4, 2003	Lubbock	Texas Tech	59–28
63	November 11, 2004	College Station	#22 Texas A&M	32–25^{OT}
64	November 5, 2005	Lubbock	#16 Texas Tech	56–17
65	September 30, 2006	College Station	#24 Texas Tech	31–27
66	October 13, 2007	Lubbock	Texas Tech	35–7
67	October 18, 2008	College Station	#7 Texas Tech	43–25
68	October 24, 2009	Lubbock	Texas A&M	52–30
69	October 30, 2010	College Station	Texas A&M	45–27
70	October 8, 2011	Lubbock	#24 Texas A&M	45–40
Series: Texas A&M leads 37–32–1

== See also ==
- List of NCAA college football rivalry games
