= Will Rogers Memorial Center =

- U.S. National Register of Historic Places
- U.S. Historic district
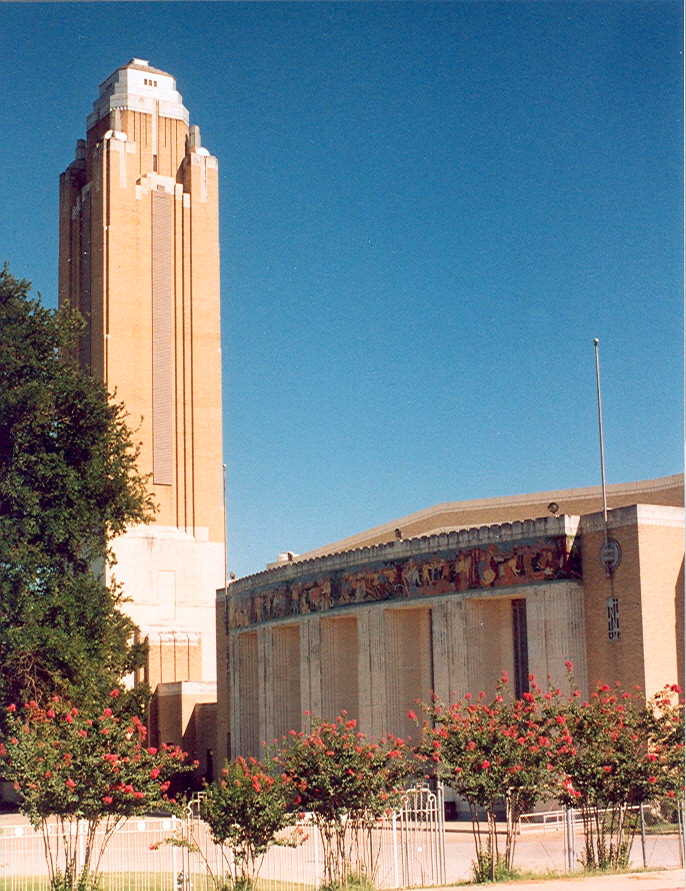
- Pioneer Tower and Will Rogers Auditorium in 1993

- Location within Texas Location within the United States
- Location: 3401 W. Lancaster Ave., Fort Worth, Texas United States
- Coordinates: 32°44′46″N 97°21′59″W
- Area: 120 acres (49 ha)
- Built: 1936
- Architect: Wyatt C. Hedrick,
- Architectural style: Modern Movement, Art Deco
- NRHP reference No.: 16000122
- Added to NRHP: March 22, 2016

The Will Rogers Memorial Center (WRMC) is a 120-acre (0.49 km^{2}) American public entertainment, sports and livestock complex located in Fort Worth, Texas. It is named for American humorist and writer Will Rogers. It is a popular location for the hosting of specialized equestrian and livestock shows, including the annual Fort Worth Stock Show, the annual National Reined Cow Horse Association Snaffle Bit Futurity, the World Championship Paint Horse Show, and three major events of the National Cutting Horse Association each year. It is also the former home of the Fort Worth Texans ice hockey team, and it hosted a PBR Bud Light Cup Series (later Built Ford Tough Series) event annually from 1995 through 2004. Events at the WRMC attract over two million visitors annually. The complex contains the following facilities:

- Will Rogers Coliseum (5,652 seats)
- Will Rogers Auditorium (2,856 seats)
- Will Rogers Equestrian Center
- Amon G. Carter Jr. Exhibits Hall
- James L. & Eunice West Arena
- John Justin Arena
- W. R. Watt Arena

The Memorial Center was built in 1936 and designed by architect Wyatt C. Hedrick, who employed the Moderne (Art Deco) style. Also in 1936, Amon G. Carter commissioned Electra Waggoner Biggs to create the statue Riding into the Sunset, a tribute to Will Rogers and his horse Soapsuds. Over a decade later, in 1947, the work was unveiled at the Center. On March 22, 2016, the complex was placed on the National Register of Historic Places.

Will Rogers Memorial Coliseum was the home of the Fort Worth Stock Show & Rodeo for many years. The rodeo is sanctioned by the Professional Rodeo Cowboys Association (PRCA). Ariat Arena, which opened in November 2019, is located adjacent to the complex. The 14,000-seat venue has hosted the Fort Worth Stock Show & Rodeo since 2020, as well as concerts and early-round games in the 2022 NCAA Division I men's basketball tournament; however, Will Rogers Memorial Center continues to operate as an equestrian arena in Fort Worth.

Beginning in 2026, Will Rogers Memorial Coliseum is the home venue of the National Breakaway Finals (NBF).

== Gallery ==
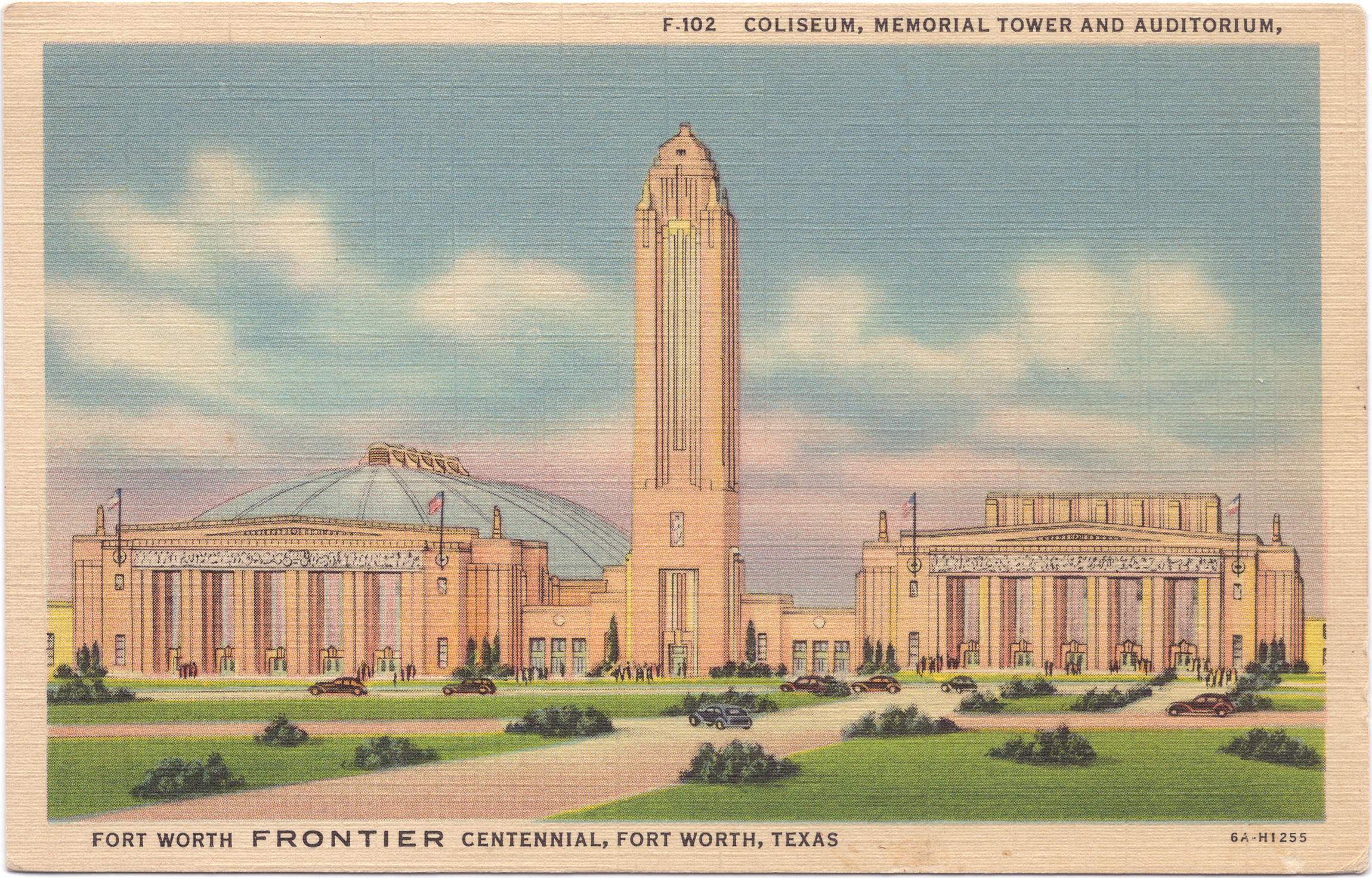
Postcard of Will Rogers Coliseum, Memorial Pioneer Tower and Will Rogers Auditorium, undated

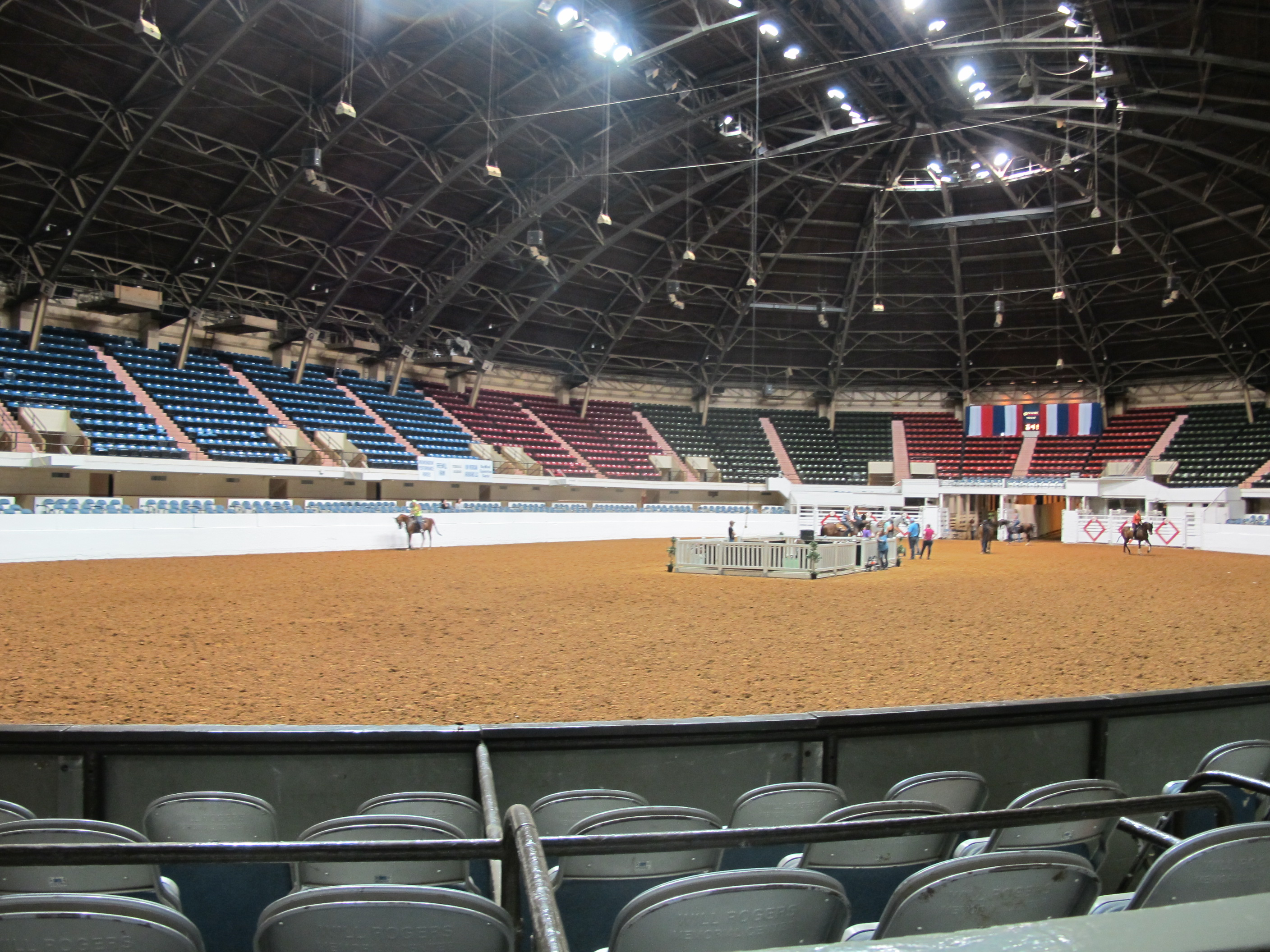
Interior of Will Rogers Coliseum, 2016

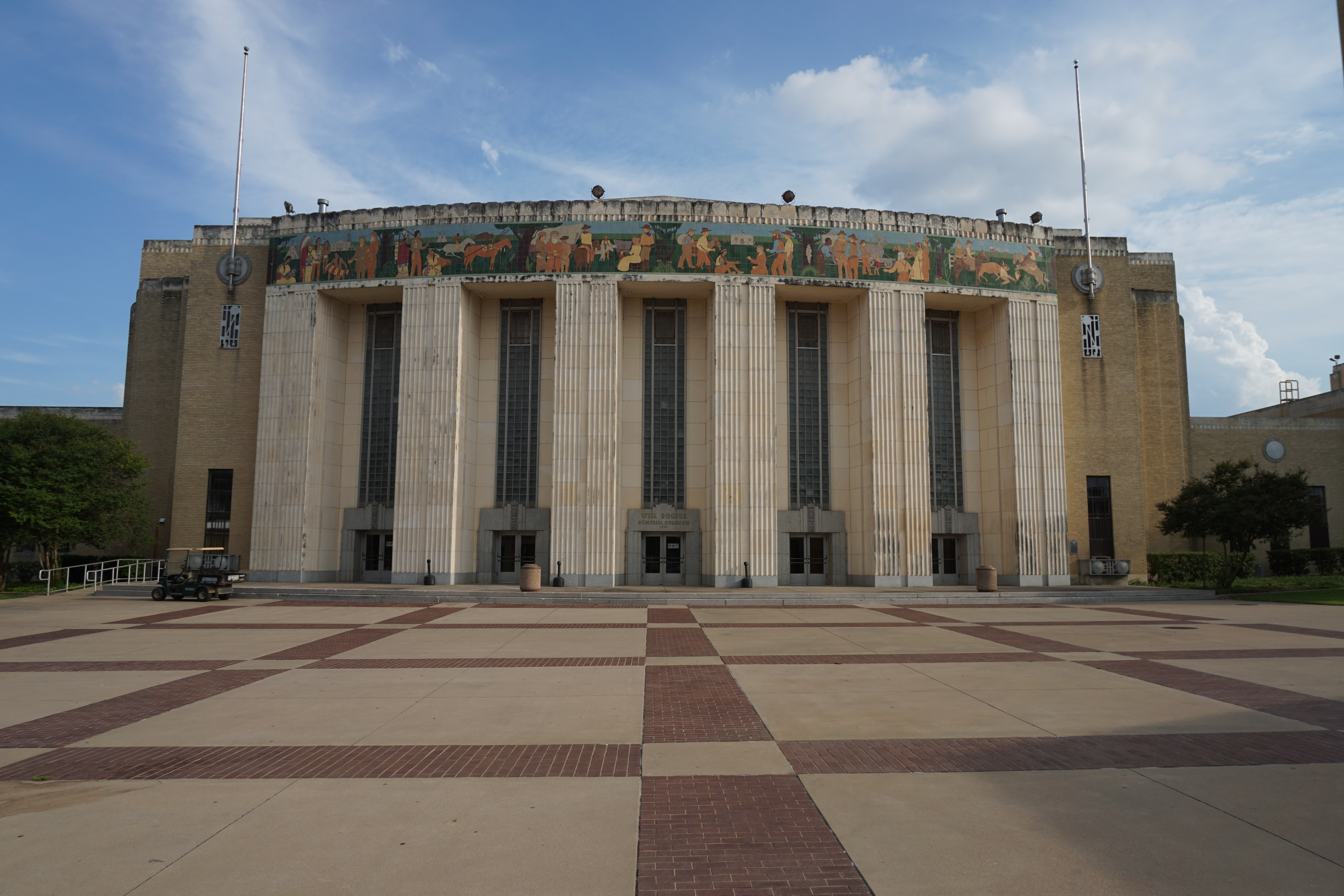
Exterior of Will Rogers Coliseum, 2016

== See also ==
- National Register of Historic Places listings in Tarrant County, Texas
