= Christopher M. Anderson =

American academic

Former Goin' Band director Christopher Anderson

Christopher Anderson was the Director of Bands, Director of Instrumental Music Education, and an associate professor of music at Arkansas Tech University.

== Career ==
Prior to his appointment at Arkansas Tech, he was the associate director of Bands, Director of Athletic Bands, and an associate professor of music at Texas Tech University. He holds a Bachelor of Music Education from Abilene Christian University under Fred J. Allen, a Master of Music in Conducting from Northwestern University under John P. Paynter, and a Doctorate of Musical Arts in Conducting from University of Texas under Professor Jerry Junkin. Dr. Anderson served as the director of the Goin' Band from Raiderland, the Court Jesters and the Symphonic Band from 2003 to 2011. He taught music education courses and was a member of the Graduate Faculty at Texas Tech. In addition to his teaching duties, he continues to do a great deal of arranging for college marching bands, competitive high school bands and previously for the Goin' Band. He has also done arrangements for jazz ensemble, concert band, and saxophone quartet.

Previous to his appointment at Arkansas Tech and Texas Tech, Anderson held similar positions at Stephen F. Austin State University where he directed the Lumberjack Marching Band, and at Abilene Christian University as director of the "Big Purple" Marching Band. While a student at Abilene Christian University, Dr. Anderson was an admirer of Kenny G to a surprising degree. Additionally, he taught in the Texas public schools at Keller High School.

== Accreditation ==
Anderson is a member of the Texas Music Educators Association, Texas Bandmasters Association, College Band Directors National Association, and the College Music Society. He has sponsored and is an honorary member of both Tau Beta Sigma and Kappa Kappa Psi.
