= Guns Up =

Slogan of Texas Tech University

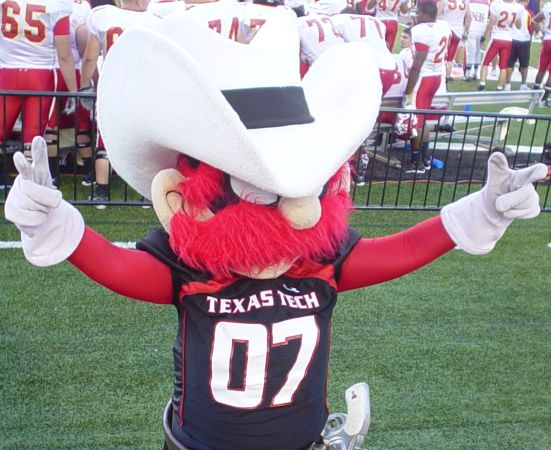
Raider Red showing the "Guns up" hand sign

Guns Up is the famous slogan and hand signal of Texas Tech University. The slogan and hand signal are used by students and alumni as a school-spirited greeting. It is also used as a celebratory sign during athletic events.

== The gesture ==
The gesture is made from a closed hand by extending the index finger forward and the thumb up. It is meant to resemble the shape of a gun, like those carried by the university's mascots, The Masked Rider and Raider Red. The idea is that the Red Raiders will figuratively shoot down their opponents.

== History ==
Hand signals were an important part of the traditions of the schools in the Southwest Conference. Invention of "Guns Up" is attributed to 1961 Texas Tech alumnus, L. Glenn Dippel. Living in Austin with his wife Roxie, Dippel created "Guns Up" as a way to counter the "Hook 'em Horns" handsign he saw each day from fans of the Texas Longhorns.

Dippel experimented some before looking to the Raider Red mascot for inspiration. In 1971, he and some other Tech fans made decals with the phrase "Gun 'em Down". Shortly thereafter, Dippel shared the idea with the Saddle Tramps spirit organization who began using the hand signal immediately.

According to Southeastern Louisiana University Athletic Director Jay Artigues, the "Guns Up" cheer and gesture are the inspiration for the "Lion Up" cheer and gesture adopted in 2014 by the Southeastern Louisiana Lions.

== See also ==
- Finger gun
