= Goin' Band from Raiderland =

Marching band of Texas Tech University

- School: Texas Tech University
- Location: Lubbock, Texas
- Conference: Big 12
- Founded: 1925
- Director: Joel Pagán
- Assistant Director: Eric Allen
- Members: 400+
- Fight song: "Fight, Raiders, Fight"

Uniform
- Matador style

The Goin' Band from Raiderland is the 400+ member marching band of Texas Tech University.

== History ==
The Matador band at the Texas Tech-Loyola Parade in 1934

The Goin' Band from Raiderland, originally known as The Matador Band, is nearly as old as Texas Tech itself. Under the direction of W. Waghorne, it performed at the opening football game in October 1925, fielding between 21 and 25 members.

In 1926, Harry Lemaire (1862–1963) was appointed director of the marching band. Following his service in the British Army, Lemaire had been bandmaster under Theodore Roosevelt during the Spanish–American War and was a friend and colleague of John Philip Sousa. Under his leadership, the band earned its name when it became the first college band to travel to an away game. Also during Lemaire's tenure, the band became the first one to have its halftime show broadcast over the radio.

American humorist Will Rogers once aided in financing a trip to Fort Worth, Texas, so the band could perform at a game against the TCU Horned Frogs, becoming the first band to travel to an away game. Rogers also helped purchase new uniforms.

In 1934, Dewey O. "Prof" Wiley (1898–1980) became director and expanded the band from 60 members to more than 200 over the next few years.

In 1938 Texas Tech became the first university in Texas to house a chapter of Kappa Kappa Psi. Kappa Kappa Psi's "sister" organization, Tau Beta Sigma, originated at Texas Tech in 1937. However, due to legal complications, the sorority could not apply for a national charter. The Alpha chapter of Tau Beta Sigma was given to the band club at Oklahoma A&M University (now Oklahoma State University), with Texas Tech accepting the Beta chapter.

Dean Killion (1926–1997) came to the Goin' Band in 1959. As his predecessor had done, Killion generated another expansion, this time doubling the ranks to over four hundred members.

To ensure that all individual listeners would hear the same quality performance no matter where they sat in the stadium, Killion arranged shows so that equal instrumentation was always on both sides of the 50-yard line, and that the band played more or less equally to both halves of the stadium. This mirrored instrumentation has become known as Band 1 and Band 2, such that Band 1 performs on the right side of the 50 yard line and Band 2 on the left. Members have fierce pride in their band and thus, a rivalry exists between Band 1 and Band 2.

In 1981, Keith Bearden became the first Texas Tech alumnus to become director of the Goin' Band. He continued the style and traditions of previous directors as well as leading the band to the prestigious Sudler Trophy in 1999. Bearden also opened new venues for the Goin' Band, such as when the band traveled to Ireland in 1998 to take part in Saint Patrick's Day parades in both Dublin and Limerick.

The Goin' Band also received another honor when one of its members, Armen Williams, became the first homecoming king representing the Goin' Band and Kappa Kappa Psi in the fall of 2004.

Keith Dye and Duane Hill served as Interim Co-Directors of the Goin' Band from Raiderland while Director Christopher M. Anderson was on temporary leave. He was expected to return for the 2011–12 season but has since resigned his position and has accepted the position of Director of Bands at Arkansas Tech University. Hill subsequently took on the role of Goin' Band director, and remained in that role until his departure in 2018.

On March 19, 2018, Duane Hill resigned as associate Directors of Bands after allegations of sexual harassment and assault and a subsequent investigation. On April 26, 2018, the School of Music announced that Eric Allen, Joel Pagán, and Ryan Smith would be filling the role as interim Goin' Band directors in Fall 2018. Joel Pagán was appointed director of the Goin' Band in Fall, 2019.

The Goin' Band notably played in the 97th annual Macy's Thanksgiving day parade on November 23, 2023.

== The Goin' Band Today ==
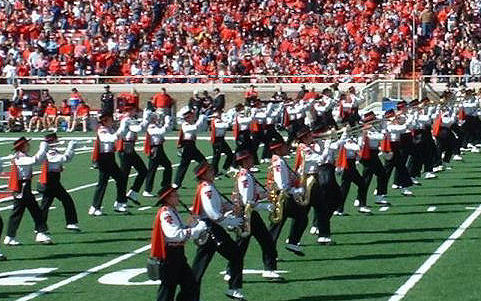
Texas Tech's Goin' Band from Raiderland on the field at a football game vs. Baylor in 2006

In keeping with the campus' Spanish Renaissance architecture, the uniforms of the Goin' Band are styled after the trajes of matadors, complete with cape and a flat-brimmed "gaucho" hat. The traditional style of these uniforms has been in place for nearly twenty years. The Goin' Band, through many generous private gifts, along with the help of the University and the Goin' Band Association, received brand new uniforms in the fall of 2008.

The Goin' Band's repertoire of performance music varies widely, ranging from traditional marches to jazz pieces to the works of Elton John and Carlos Santana.

The Goin' Band makes use of both traditional-style marching (formations moving goal-line to goal-line) and corps-style (formations while playing to the sidelines) in its performances. The Goin' Band also incorporates some of the tactics of scramble bands.

Like most other schools' bands, the Goin' Band is open to all Texas Tech students, regardless of major or course of study. In fact, a significant portion of the band's membership are not music majors. Practically every single department and course of study available at Texas tech University is represented in the Goin' Band's membership. For this reason, the Goin' Band implements a fast but efficient method of learning new performances that often does not require practices outside of normal class time ("Marching Band" is an actual course at Texas Tech). This allows a wide variety of students to participate without putting extra strain on their other obligations. Six, and sometimes seven different shows are performed by the Goin' Band over the course of a season. It is not unusual for the band to learn a new show from scratch in only five days, and have it ready for performance on Saturday, then start again with a new drill the following Monday.

== Traditional music of Texas Tech University ==
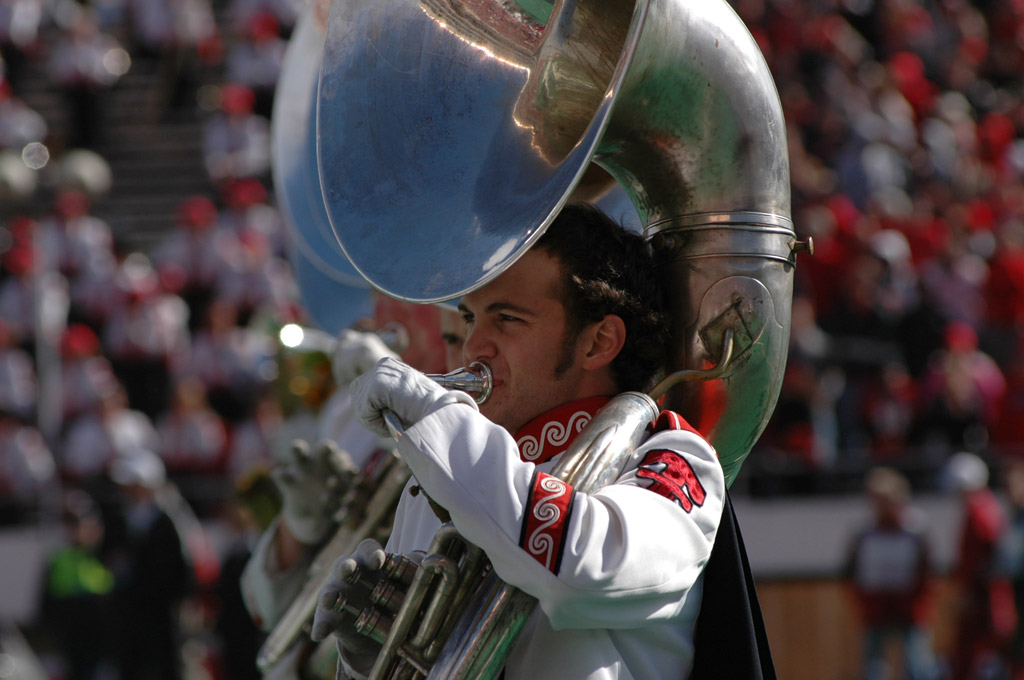
A band member plays a sousaphone.

- "Cotton Fields" Huddie Ledbetter (1940) Arranged by Joel Leach
- "Fight On For Texas Tech" Thornton W. Allen
- "Fight Raiders, Fight" Carroll McMath and James Nevins (1936)
- "Macarena" Bernardino B. Monterde (1944)
- "Malaguena" Ernesto Lecuona y Casado (1927)
- "March Grandioso" Roland F. Seitz (1909)
- "Red Raider Fanfare" Richard E. Tolley
- "Ride, Raider, Ride" Richard E. Tolley (1961)
- "Texas, Our Texas" William J. Marsh and Gladys Yoakum Wright (1924)
- "Texas Tech On Parade" Edward S. Chenette
- "The Battle Hymn of the Republic" William Steffe and Julia Ward Howe (1861)
- "The Matador Song" (Alma Mater of Texas Tech University) R.C. Marshall and Harry Lemaire (1931)
- "The Star-Spangled Banner" Francis Scott Key (1814) adapted by Henry Fillmore (1934)
- “Wreck Em’ Fanfare” Gabriel Musella (2023)

== Directors ==
- 1925–1926: W. Waghorne (Chairman of the Department of Music; the position of Director did not yet exist)
- 1926–1934: Harry Lemaire
- 1934–1959: D. O. "Prof" Wiley
- 1959–1981: Dean Killion
- 1981–2003: Keith Bearden
- 2003–2010: Christopher M. Anderson
- 2010–2011: Keith Dye and Duane Hill
- 2012–2017: Duane Hill
- 2018–Present: Eric Allen
- 2019–Present: Joel Pagán
