= The Masked Rider =

Primary mascot of Texas Tech University

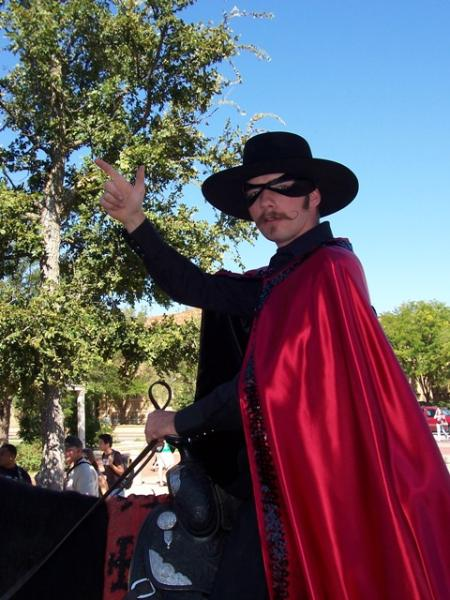
- The Masked Rider gives the Guns Up hand sign.
- University: Texas Tech University
- Conference: Big 12
- Description: Live horse and rider
- Origin of name: Based on the rider's outfit
- First seen: 1936
- Related mascot(s): Raider Red

The Masked Rider is the primary mascot of Texas Tech University. It is the oldest of the university's mascots still in existence today. Originally called "Ghost Rider", it was an unofficial mascot appearing in a few games in 1936 and then became the official mascot with the 1954 Gator Bowl. The Masked Rider has led the team onto the field at nearly every football game since. It is the nation's first school mascot to feature a live horse at a football game, ahead of Florida State's Chief Osceola and Renegade and 25 years before USC's Traveler and all other such mascots in existence today.

After learning of the Masked Rider, other schools emulated the idea of a mounted mascot. Florida State began their tradition in 1978, immediately after seeing Texas Tech's live mascot at the 1977 Tangerine Bowl that pitted the two. The Oklahoma State Cowboys copied the Masked Rider in 1984 when Eddy Finley, a Texas Tech alumnus became an Oklahoma State University agricultural education professor, and started the Spirit Rider Program when both schools were still in separate conferences.

The Masked Rider is adorned from head to toe in black, including a black gaucho hat and a black mask. The only other color present is the scarlet rider's cape. The current horse is also black, a tradition for the last 40 years, although horses prior to the 70s were on occasion other colors.

Students must pass a rigorous interview and testing process in order to be selected for this honor by the Masked Rider Advisory Committee. The Masked Rider is available for public appearances for no fee, though a donation is encouraged.

In 2000, the Masked Rider tradition was commemorated with the unveiling of a sculpture outside Frazier Alumni Pavilion on Texas Tech's campus. The Grant Speed crafted sculpture is 25 percent larger than life. In August 2013, the statue was wrapped in black Crêpe paper to mourn the death of the first Masked Rider, Joe Kirk Fulton.

== History ==
The Masked Rider sculpture

In 1936, the first rider, George Tate (class of 1937), led the football team onto the football field then left the field. Tate, whose identity was kept a secret at the time, was wearing a scarlet satin cape made by the Home Economics Department. He had borrowed a horse from the Tech barn as a prank. Tate was quoted in the November 4, 1984, issue of The Dallas Morning News as saying that Arch Lamb, who was then the head yell leader of the Saddle Tramps, "dreamed up this Red Raider thing." The prank was pulled a few more times that season but didn't surface again until the 1950s, when another Tech student was approached about creating a mascot.

In 1953, Texas Tech football coach DeWitt Weaver approached a student named Joe Kirk Fulton about becoming the Masked Rider. DeWitt's Red Raiders were 10-1-0 in football and headed to Jacksonville, Florida for the Gator Bowl. At the time, Texas Tech was hoping to be invited to join the Southwest Conference. All the other teams had a mascot, and it is thought that DeWitt believed creating a mascot for Texas Tech might aid the school's chances for admission into the conference. Fulton agreed to ride a horse named Blackie in the bowl game.

Texas Tech's Center for Campus Life explains:

According to reports from those present at the 1954 Gator Bowl, the crowd sat in stunned silence as they watched Fulton and Blackie rush onto the football field, followed by the team. After a few moments of stunned disbelief, the silent crowd burst into cheers. Ed Danforth, a writer for the Atlanta Journal and a press box spectator later wrote, "No team in any bowl game ever made a more sensational entrance."

The Masked Rider logo

Beginning in the early 1960s, the Texas Tech marching band has played a composition written expressly for the mascot. "Ride, Raider, Ride" (commonly known as The Horse Music) is performed in quick time as the horse is galloped around the stadium sidelines. The highly spirited tune was composed by faculty member Richard Tolley, Professor of trumpet and Associate Director of Bands, 1959-1991.

=== Riders and Horses ===
There have been 62 different student riders and 15 different horses that have served as the Masked Rider mascot.

YEAR		RIDER	HOMETOWN	HORSE
1953-1954	1	Joe Kirk Fulton	Lubbock, TX	unsure
1954-1955		Joe Kirk Fulton	Lubbock, TX	unsure
1955-1956	2	Jim Cloyd	Stratford, TX	Blackie
1956-1957		Jim Cloyd	Stratford, TX	Tech Beauty
1957-1958	3	Donald "Polly" Hollar	Benham, TX	Tech Beauty
1958-1959		Donald "Polly" Hollar	Benham, TX	Tech Beauty
1959-1960	4	J.H. "Hud" Rhea	Roswell, NM	Beau Black
1960-1961		J.H. "Hud" Rhea	Roswell, NM	Beau Black
1961-1962	5	Kelley Waggoner	Hillsboro, NM	Tech Beauty
1962-1963	6	Bill Durfey	The Woodlands, TX	Tech Beauty
1963-1964	7	Douglas "Nubbin" Hollar	Brenham, TX	Charcoal Cody
1964-1965	8	Douglas "Dink" Wilson	Quanah, TX	Charcoal Cody
1965-1966		Douglas "Dink" Wilson	Quanah, TX	Charcoal Cody
1966-1967		Douglas "Nubbin" Hollar	Brenham, TX	Charcoal Cody
1967-1968		Douglas "Nubbin" Hollar	Brenham, TX	Charcoal Cody
1968-1969	9	Johnny Bob Carruth	De Leon, TX	Charcoal Cody
1969-1970		Johnny Bob Carruth	De Leon, TX	Charcoal Cody
1970-1971	10	Tommy Martin	Graham, TX	Charcoal Cody
1971-1972	11	Randy Jeffers	Amarillo, TX	Charcoal Cody
1972-1973		Randy Jeffers	Amarillo, TX	Showboy Huffman
1973-1974	12	Gerald Nobles	Midland, TX	Happy Five
1974-1975	13	Anne Lynch	Dell City, TX	Happy Five
1975-1976	14	Joe Kim King	Brady, TX	Happy Five
1976-1977	15	Jess Wall	Perryton, TX	Happy Five
1977-1978	16	Larry Cade	Copperas Cove, TX	Happy Five
1978-1979	17	Lee Puckitt	San Angelo, TX	Happy VI
1979-1980	18	Coke Hopping	Memphis, TX	Happy VI
1980-1981	19	Kathleen Campbell	El Paso, TX	Happy VI-II
1981-1982	20	Kurt Harris	Collinsville, TX	Happy VI-II
1982-1983	21	Perry Church	Canyon, TX	Happy VI-II
1983-1984	22	Jennifer Aufill	Buffalo Gap, TX	Happy VI-II
1984-1985	23	Zurick Labrier	Guymon, OK	Happy VI-II
1985-1986	24	Jerrell Key	Lubbock, TX	Happy VI-II
1986-1987	25	Daniel Jenkins	Turkey, TX	Happy VI-II
1987-1988	26	Kim Saunders	Colfax, LA	Midnight Raider
1988-1989	27	Lea Whitehead	Midland, TX	Midnight Raider
1989-1990	28	Tonya Tinnin	Bryson, TX	Midnight Raider
1990-1991	29	Blaine Lemons	Colorado City, TX	Midnight Raider
1991-1992	30	RaLynn Key	Crosbyton, TX	Midnight Raider
1992-1993	31	Jason Spence	Seminole, TX	Midnight Raider
1993-1994	32	Lisa Gilbreath	Lewisville, TX	Double T
1994-1995	33	Amy Smart	Midland, TX	Double T
1995-1996	34	JoLynn Self	Lubbock, TX	High Red
1996-1997	35	Martha Reed	San Angelo, TX	High Red
1997-1998	36	Becky McDougal	Lubbock, TX	High Red
1998-1999	37	Michael "Dusty" Abney	Lubbock, TX	Black Phantom Raider
1999-2000	38	Travis L. Thorne	New Deal, TX	Black Phantom Raider
2000-2001	39	Lesley Gilbreath	Flower Mound, TX	Black Phantom Raider
2001-2002	40	Katie Carruth	De Leon, TX	Black Phantom Raider
2002-2003	41	Jessica Melvin	Pierre, SD	Midnight Matador
2003-2004	42	Ben Holland	Texline, TX	Midnight Matador
2004-2005	43	Stacy Stockard	Sanger, TX	Midnight Matador
2005-2006	44	Justin Burgin	Scurry, TX	Midnight Matador
2006-2007	45	Amy Bell	Kermit, TX	Midnight Matador
2007-2008	46	Kevin Burns	Clovis, NM	Midnight Matador
2008-2009	47	Ashley Hartzog	Farwell, TX	Midnight Matador
2009-2010	48	Brianne Hight	Clovis, NM	Midnight Matador
2010-2011	49	Christi Chadwell	Garland, TX	Midnight Matador
2011-2012	50	Bradley Skinner	Arvada, CO	Midnight Matador
2012-2013	51	Ashley Wenzel	Friendswood, TX	Midnight Matador
2013-2014	52	Corey Waggoner	Lubbock, TX	Fearless Champion
2014-2015	53	Mackenzie White	Marble Falls, TX	Fearless Champion
2015-2016	54	Rachel McLelland	Tijeras, NM	Fearless Champion
2016-2017	55	Charlie Snider	Corinth, TX	Fearless Champion
2017-2018	56	Laurie Tolboom	Dublin, TX	Fearless Champion
2018-2019	57	Lyndi Starr	Mount Vernon, TX	Fearless Champion
2019-2020	58	Emily Brodbeck	Lubbock, TX	Fearless Champion
2020-2021	59	Cameron Hekkert	Highlands Ranch, CO	Fearless Champion
2021-2022	60	Ashley Adams	Lubbock, TX	Fearless Champion
2022-2023	61	Caroline Hobbs	Dallas, TX	Centennial Champion
2023-2024	62	Lauren Bloss	El Paso, TX	Centennial Champion
2024-2025	63	Ellie Brown	Canyon, TX	Centennial Champion
2025-2026	64	Rose Rosas	Brady, TX	Centennial Champion
2026-2027	65	Sofie Jones	Houston, TX	Matador

=== Incidents ===
Sculpture of the Masked Rider wrapped in black in mourning of the death of the first Masked Rider, Joe Kirk Fulton, in 2013

- In 1963, the horse, Tech Beauty, was kidnapped and spray-painted with the letters "AMC" prior to Tech's football game against rival Texas A&M.
- In 1974, the selection of the first female Masked Rider, Ann Lynch, caused widespread controversy.
- In 1975, the horse was kidnapped and received chemical burns after being painted with orange paint prior to Tech's football game against Texas.
- In 1982, the Masked Rider was involved in injuring an opposing school's cheerleader. Ten years later, the Masked Rider was involved in the injuring of a referee.
- On September 3, 1994, an accident involving the Masked Rider resulted in the death of Texas Tech's animal mascot, a black American Quarter Horse named Double T during a Lubbock football game between Texas Tech and the New Mexico Lobos. After a 3rd quarter score by Tech, then Masked Rider, Amy Smart, fell from the horse after the horse's saddle broke during the customary post-score gallop around the stadium field, and the horse eventually ran unaccompanied towards the exit tunnel where it accidentally collided with the stadium wall dying instantly.
- In 2001, the Masked Rider horse trailer was involved in a car accident. The horse, Black Phantom Raider, sustained serious injuries which led to his euthanization.
- In 2006, the Masked Rider appeared as No. 24 on the CollegeFootballNews.com list of "College Football's 25 Greatest Mascots".
- The horse, Midnight Matador, served as the Masked Rider's mount from 2002–2012. Midnight Matador was retired during the 2012 season following a leg injury, having been the longest serving at the position in school history.

== Raider Red ==
Around the 1971 football season, the Southwest Conference created a rule forbidding the bringing of live animal mascots to away games unless the host school allowed it. Since the Masked Rider's horse might be prohibited from traveling to some games under this rule, an alternate mascot named Raider Red was created; Raider Red is a person wearing a normal mascot costume.

== See also ==
- Zorro
