= Raider Red =

Mascot of Texas Tech University

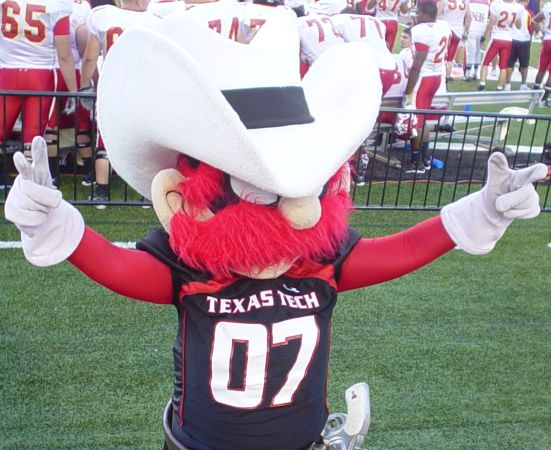
- Raider Red giving the Guns Up gesture
- University: Texas Tech University
- Conference: Big 12
- Description: Costume
- Origin of name: Variation of team name, Red Raiders
- First seen: 1971
- Related mascot(s): The Masked Rider

Raider Red is one of the mascots of Texas Tech University. The university's primary mascot is The Masked Rider who rides a live horse. Raider Red is used at events where The Masked Rider is not allowed or would not be appropriate.

== History ==
Raider Red is a Wild West character with an oversized cowboy hat. He carries two guns which he fires into the air after Texas Tech scores. Jim Gaspard, a member of the Texas Tech Saddle Tramps student spirit organization, created the original design for the Raider Red costume based on a character created by Lubbock, Texas, cartoonist and former mayor Dirk West. Gaspard used papier-mache and chicken wire to mold the first Raider Red head and it took him three to four weeks to complete. Raider Red was first seen publicly on September 10, 1971.

The student serving as Raider Red is a member of the Saddle Tramps or High Riders. Although The Masked Rider's identity is public knowledge, Raider Red's identity is normally kept secret until the end of their tenure as mascot. The first Saddle Tramp to become Red Raider after Jim Gaspard was Stan Alcott from 1971 to 1973. The identity of Red Raider was known and Stan would wear the costume to the game.

Around the 1971 football season, the Southwest Conference created a rule forbidding the bringing of live animal mascots to away games unless the host school permitted it. Since the Masked Rider's horse might have been prohibited from attending some games under this rule, Raider Red was created as an alternate mascot. Texas Tech now plays in the Big 12 Conference, but the tradition of having both mascots continues.

On March 15, 2007, it was revealed that, for the first time, two different people (one man and one woman) served as Raider Red during the same period of time.

In 2012, Raider Red won the Capital One Mascot Challenge, beating the University of South Carolina's Cocky in the final.

In 2021 Raider Red took the National Cheerleading Associations Mascot Championships stage in Daytona, Florida for the first time in his 50 year lifespan. Raider Red won his first NCA Mascot National Championship that year with a score of 94.28. Competing again in 2022, Raider Red went back to back winning his second NCA Mascot National Championship with a score of 93.28.
