= Fight, Raiders, Fight =

Song

Fight, Raiders, Fight is the fight song of the Texas Tech Red Raiders. It was written by Vic Williams and John J. Tatgenhorst in Lubbock.

The song was written for the Matadors, the original name of teams representing the school (known at the time as Texas Technological College). In 1936, Texas Tech band members Carroll McMath and James Nevins updated the song to reflect the teams' new name, Red Raiders.

== Lyrics ==
Fight, Raiders, Fight! Fight, Raiders, Fight!

Fight for the school we love so dearly.

You'll hit 'em high, you'll hit 'em low.

You'll push the ball across the goal,

Tech, Fight! Fight!

We'll praise your name, boost you to fame.

Fight for the Scarlet and Black.

You will hit 'em, you will wreck 'em.

Hit 'em! Wreck 'em, Texas Tech!

And the Victory Bells will ring out!
