= Dirk West =

American journalist (1930–1996)

26th Mayor of Lubbock, Texas
- In office 1978–1980
- Preceded by: Roy Bass
- Succeeded by: Bill McAlister

Personal details
- Born: October 23, 1928 Littlefield, Texas, U.S.
- Died: July 26, 1996 (aged 67) Austin, Texas, U.S.
- Political party: Democratic
- Occupation: Cartoonist, journalist, actor, politician

Gerald Glynn "Dirk" West (October 23, 1928 – July 26, 1996) was an editorial cartoonist, journalist, and mayor from Lubbock, Texas, most famous for his caricatures of collegiate mascots. He was born in Littlefield, Texas, but his family moved to Lubbock soon after. He attended Texas Tech University where he drew cartoons for The University Daily student newspaper. He appeared as "Uncle Dirk" on a local children's program for three years while heading up his advertising agency, West Advertising. Beginning in the 1960s, he cartooned for the Lubbock Avalanche-Journal.

== Life ==
West was born October 23, 1928, in Littlefield, Texas, to James Marion and Ethel Raye Bennett West. He attended Lubbock High School and drew cartoons for the school newspaper. He died of a heart attack on July 26, 1996, in Lubbock, Texas.

== Mascot cartoons ==
West's most famous works featured caricatures of the sports mascots of various universities, mostly those of the Southwest Conference (and later the Big 12 Conference), but other schools appeared as well, usually because they were playing Texas Tech. His cartoons appeared in program books, on posters, and in magazines.

Two of his characters would eventually be officially adopted by their respective universities: Texas Tech's Raider Red and the University of Nebraska–Lincoln's Herbie Husker.

West drew a semi-weekly one-panel comic in the Avalanche-Journal's sports section where he would lampoon college mascots and coaches alike, as well as the stereotypes of various universities. Thus there was the dim-witted Texas A&M Aggie, the devout but overemotional Baylor Bear, the arrogant University of Texas at Austin Longhorn and of course Raider Red, whose bullet-riddled Stetson showed by the number of holes the number of game losses for Texas Tech so far that season.

West would alter the image of his characters over the course of a sports season. A winning team's mascot would gradually get larger and tougher, the fans of losing teams would find their mascots growing thinner as the weeks went by.

== Politics ==
After serving several years on the local Parks and Recreation Board and the city council, West was elected mayor of Lubbock in 1978, but disliked politics so much as a result that he did not run for a second term (his single term ran from 1978 to 1980). He returned to his advertising agency and his cartooning, both of which he kept up until his death from a heart attack in 1996.

An exhibition dedicated to West and his work opened September 25, 2005, at the Museum of Texas Tech University. It ran through January 2006.
