= Texas Tech University traditions =

Aspect of Texas Tech University culture

Texas Tech University traditions are an important part of the culture of Texas Tech University.

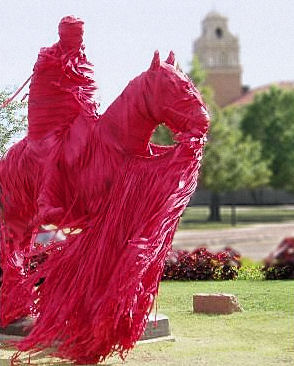
The wrapping of the statue of Will Rogers and Soapsuds, by the Saddle Tramps, is a prominent tradition at Texas Tech.

== Music ==
The Goin' Band from Raiderland is the 450-member marching band of Texas Tech University.

The Goin' Band's repertoire of performance music varies widely, ranging from traditional marches to jazz pieces to the works of Elton John and Carlos Santana.

The Goin' Band makes use of both traditional-style marching (formations moving goal-line to goal-line) and corps-style (formations while playing to the sidelines) in its performances. The Goin' Band also incorporates some of the tactics of scramble bands.

== Mascots ==
=== The Masked Rider ===
The Masked Rider statue

The Masked Rider, Texas Tech's primary mascot, dates back to a 1936 prank. George Tate borrowed a horse from the Texas Technological College Dairy Barn and led the football team onto the field. This was done a few more times during the 1936 season but was not seen again for 17 years. At the Gator Bowl on January 1, 1953, Texas Tech student Joe Kirk Fulton, riding Blackie, rushed onto the field ahead of the football team. The crowd sat in stunned silence before bursting into applause. At that game, The Masked Rider became the official mascot of Texas Tech and the first mascot in major college sports featuring a live horse.

The Masked Rider wears a black gaucho hat, a black mask, and a scarlet rider's cape. From its inception to 1974, the rider was always a male student. Ann Lynch's selection as the first female rider caused controversy at the university. Today, the student serving in the role is selected by the Masked Rider Advisor Committee after a written test, preliminary screening and equestrian skills tryout period. Ashley Adams will serve as the 60th Masked Rider for the 2021-22 academic year.

In 2000, a sculpture by artist Grant Speed was unveiled to commemorate the tradition. That statue is 25 percent larger than real life. It sits outside the university's Frazier Alumni Pavilion.

=== Raider Red ===
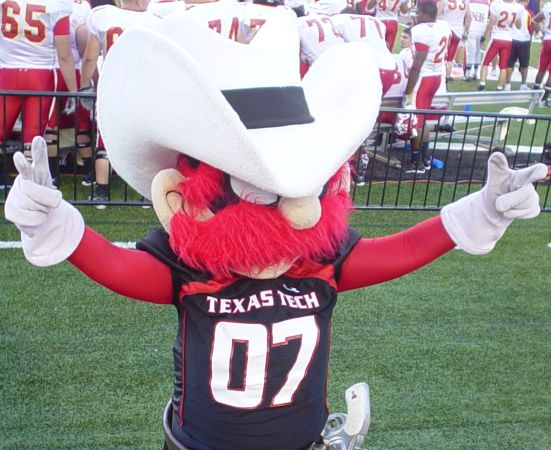
Raider Red.

Texas Tech's other mascot, Raider Red, is a more recent creation. Beginning with the 1971 football season, the Southwest Conference forbade the inclusion of live animal mascots to away games unless the host school consented. For situations where the host school did not want to allow the Masked Rider's horse, an alternate mascot was needed. Jim Gaspard, a member of the Saddle Tramps student spirit organization, created the original design for the Raider Red costume, basing it on a character created by cartoonist Dirk West, a Texas Tech alumnus and former Lubbock mayor. Though the Masked Rider's identity is public knowledge, it has always been tradition that Raider Red's student alter ego is kept secret until the end of their tenure. The student serving as Raider Red is a member of the Saddle Tramps or High Riders.

== Campus ==
=== Will Rogers & Soapsuds ===
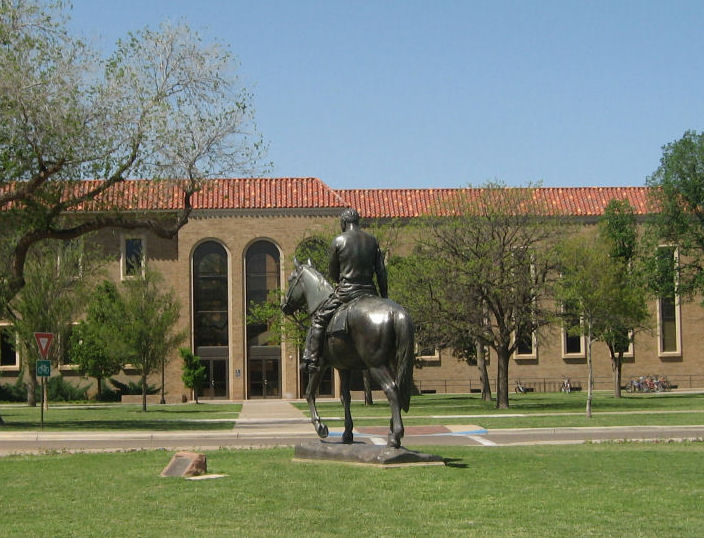
Will Rogers and Soapsuds statue

One of the most well-known landmarks on campus is the statue of Will Rogers on his horse Soapsuds. The statue, created by Electra Waggoner Biggs, has resided at the center of the campus since it was dedicated on February 16, 1950 by Rogers' longtime friend Amon G. Carter. Carter claimed that Texas Tech was the ideal setting for the statue and that it would be an appropriate addition to the traditions and scenery of West Texas. The statue, estimated to cost (in 1950) $25,000, stands 9 feet 11 inches (3.02 m) and weighs 3,200 pounds (1,450 kg). The inscription on the plaque at the base of the statue reads: "Lovable Old Will Rogers on his favorite horse, 'Soapsuds', riding into the Western sunset."

A campus legend holds that the statue was originally intended to be positioned with Will Rogers facing due west, so that it would appear he was riding into the sunset. However, that position would cause Soapsuds' posterior to face due east, towards the main entrance of the school. The horse's rear would also be facing downtown Lubbock, potentially insulting the Lubbock business community. Though proven apocryphal, legend states the statue was turned 23 degrees to the east, causing Soapsuds' rear to face in the direction of College Station, Texas, home of rival Texas A&M University to address the aforementioned issue.

=== Blarney Stone ===
On Saint Patrick's Day in 1939, Texas Tech President Clifford B. Jones and Engineering Society President Dosh McCreary unveiled the Blarney Stone monument which sits in front of the old Electrical Engineering Building. The stone on the monument was said to have been discovered on March 7, 1939, by a group of petroleum engineers on a field trip. It was reported at the time that the stone had been found to be "identical with a piece of the original Blarney Stone which disappeared from Blarney Castle...in 1659". How this was determined is unknown.

=== Double T Bench ===
The seniors of the class of 1931 donated the Double T Bench, a bench in the shape of Texas Tech's Double T logo. The bench is located in the courtyard behind the Administration Building. It is an announced tradition that no freshmen are allowed to sit on it.

== Songs ==
=== The Matador Song ===
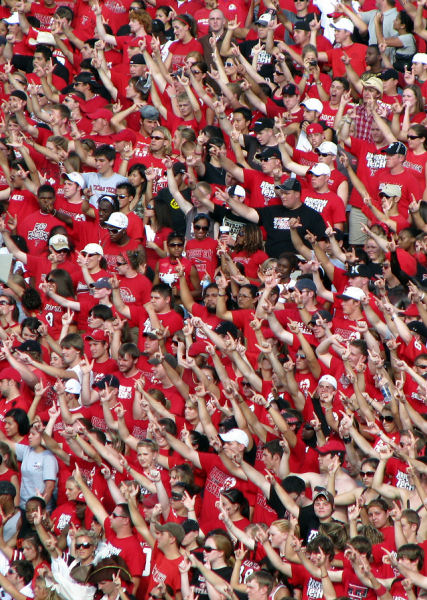
Fans displaying the Guns Up hand sign

The Matador Song was written by Harry Lemaire and R.C. Marshall. Lemaire was band director at Tech from 1925–34. He composed the music. Marshall, editor of the La Ventana, wrote the words in 1930. The words and title represent Texas Tech's original athletic teams' name of Matadors. It is the school's alma mater and is sung at athletic events and occasions such as Commencement.

Fight, Matadors, for Tech!
Songs of love we'll sing to thee,
Bear our banners far and wide.
Ever to be our pride,
Fearless champions ever be. Stand on heights of victory.
Strive for honor evermore.
Long live the Matadors!

=== Fight, Raiders, Fight ===
Fight, Raiders, Fight, Texas Tech's fight song, was written by Carroll McMath, and updates the Matadors, Tech's original name for the athletic teams, to the Red Raiders. The spirited song is sung at many of Tech's sporting events.

== Events ==
=== Arbor Day ===
Each spring, Texas Tech students gather to plant flowers and new trees on campus in an effort to beautify the campus. The tradition began in 1937 when President Knapp dedicated the day. The first Arbor Day was hosted by the Saddle Tramps, students and faculty planted 20,000 trees.

=== Carol of Lights ===
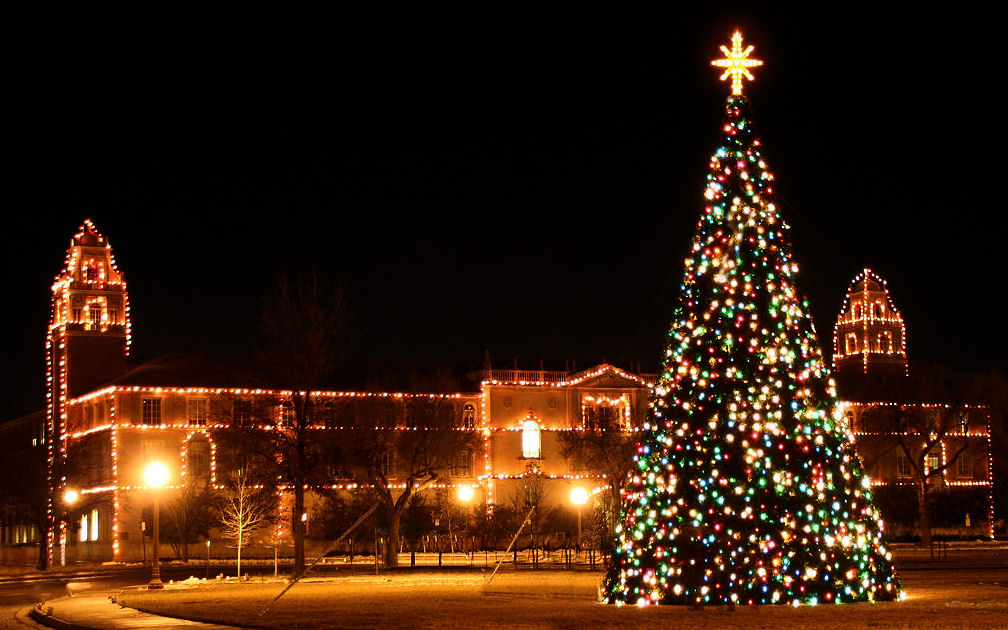
Carol of Lights

The Carol of Lights is held annually to celebrate the holiday season at the university. The event begins with the Texas Tech University Combined Choirs singing classic holiday songs at the Science Quadrangle and the Saddle Tramps carrying torches to light the way. This is followed by the lighting ceremony, where students and others witness the illuminating of the over 25,000 red, white, and orange lights decorating the 13 buildings surrounding Memorial Circle.

The tradition traces its beginnings to 1959 when Harold Hinn designed the plan and provided the funding to cover the Science Quadrangle and Administration building with lights. However, students were away on Christmas break and did not see the display. So, the following year, the Residence Hall Association created the Christmas Sing, which became known as the Carol of Lights. The Carol of Lights is now one of Texas Tech's favorite traditions.

=== Homecoming ===
Texas Tech homecoming is held each fall. It began in 1930 at a game where the football lost, 20–6, to Hardin–Simmons. During the annual celebration, Tech-exes and fans join with students for a bonfire, built by the Saddle Tramps, and pep rally, parade, open houses, awards programs, and float competitions. A highlight of the event is election of a queen, the first being Suzanne Matteson in 1954.

=== RaiderGate ===
RaiderGate is an officially sanctioned student tailgating event that takes place on campus and begins four hours before each home football game. A typical event draws nearly 10,000 students. Live music acts play on stage as students and guests barbecue, socialize, and participate in games hosted by various student organizations. Texas Tech's Student Government Association hosts the event.

=== Raider Walk ===
Since the 2010 season, a tradition called "Raider Walk" gives Red Raider fans the chance to greet the football team as the team arrives at the stadium prior to the game. The Raider Walk starts exactly two hours and 15 minutes prior to kickoff at all home football games at Jones AT&T Stadium. The team busses will drop off the team and coaching staff there at the intersection of Canton Avenue and Drive of Champions (the corner of Dan Law Field at Rip Griffin Park and the City Bank Auditorium) and will proceed down Drive of Champions in front of the Frazier Alumni Pavilion and all the way to the football training facility, just east of the Athletic Training Center (ATC). Raider Walk was predicated by "Red Raid" a similar team walk event that took place during the 2003 season. For the 2013 football season, Head Coach, Kliff Kingsbury discontinued the raider walk.

== Spirit organizations ==
=== Saddle Tramps ===
Saddle Tramps is a spirit/social organization at Texas Tech University. Founded in 1936, it is the oldest student organization on campus. During that year, while Texas Tech was very young and establishing its identity, a group of students Arch Lamb, Paul "Grandma" Bowers and Bud Thompson observed that the school spirit was being channeled in the wrong direction. The student body was overly exuberant and unorganized. Lamb conceived the idea of an organization that would lead this enthusiastic spirit into constructive channels. It was decided that Saddle Tramps should be a non-political organization dedicated to the improvement and advancement of Texas Tech as well as service and leadership to the university and student body. Early Texas ranchers would hire a "saddle tramp" on the basis of his ability and willingness to tackle any task assigned to him. He would move on after some time, having done all he could to contribute to the improvement of the ranch. It was from this idea that Lamb named the group as he did. The first men selected were the top ones in each college of the university. Each of these men chose others who he thought would make the best members.

The projects of Saddle Tramps have included such things as rallying freshmen at athletic events, supervising the planting of 20,000 trees on campus in 1938 and raising money to buy the first forty band uniforms. They played a major role in obtaining the fountain and seal, which is located at the Broadway Street entrance to campus. In the spring of 1990, Saddle Tramps established the Saddle Tramp Student Endowment Scholarship Fund and donated money to the renovation of the Tech Dairy Barn the following year.

Saddle Tramps are known for wrapping the Will Rogers & Soapsuds "Riding into the Sunset" statue in red crepe paper before each home football game. The statue is also wrapped in black crepe paper to mourn national tragedies. The victory bells are rang by the Saddle Tramps for thirty minutes after every home football, men's basketball, and baseball win; whenever a Tech team wins a Big 12 championship; whenever a Tech athlete is selected as an All-American; and after every Tech graduation. Saddle Tramps also construct the Homecoming bonfire and conduct a torchlight parade at the beginning of the bonfire as well as the Carol of Lights.

Saddle Tramp Jim Gaspard created the university's costumed mascot Raider Red, based on a character by Dirk West. During the tenure, the identity of the person playing Raider Red is unknown to everyone but the Saddle Tramps.

Prospective members receive a bid after attending rush week at the beginning of each semester. Membership is limited to 100 actives and pledges.

A Saddle Tramp must have an active and working knowledge of Texas Tech, its history, schools and colleges, location of buildings, and staff in order that he be better prepared to answer questions of visitors and of fellow students and also for his own information. It is also necessary for him to know the history of the Saddle Tramp organization in order to help him better understand the purpose of the organization and his duties as a Saddle Tramp.

=== High Riders ===
High Riders is a spirit organization at Texas Tech University. It is dedicated to promoting unity and support for all women's athletics at the school. The High Riders take part in parades and campus events throughout the year to endorse the Lady Raiders. They also hold the distinction of being the only people, along with the Saddle Tramps, allowed in the bell tower of the Administration Building to ring the Victory bells after each Lady Raider home victory.

The organization dates to 1975 and traces its roots to Nancy Neill. After attending a Saddle Tramps meeting, she discovered there had been several failed attempts to organize a women's organization to support Texas Tech's women athletes. She decided that, with better planning, she could create a lasting group to fill the gap.

On February 2, 1976, the High Riders were accepted as an official campus organization. They began work immediately and, the following fall, 75 undergraduates attended rush parties. Twenty-five were chosen to be members of the first pledge class. They pledged through January 1977 and were initiated on February 4.

When the organization first began, the High Riders had no direct funds from the university. They had to support themselves by way of bake sales, selling dorm room carpet, and selling programs at Lady Raiders sporting events. In time, the High Riders expanded and played an even greater role by helping the Lady Raiders with airport transportation, game management, and giving recruits campus tours.

== Symbols ==
=== Double T ===
Double T spirit logo

The most readily identified symbol of Texas Tech is the Double T logo. The logo, generally attributed to Texas Tech's first football coach, E. Y. Freeland, was first used as decoration on the sweaters for the football players. The Double T existed in its original form as an official logo from 1963 to 1999 and was updated in 2000. The new logo maintains the original promise but incorporates three-dimensional bevelling effects coupled with white trim.

To recognize the importance of the Double T to Texas Tech, the class of 1931 donated the Double T bench. Per tradition, freshmen are not allowed to sit on the bench, which is currently located in the courtyard of the Administration Building. The logo is further embodied in the Double T neon sign, donated by the class of 1938 and affixed to the east side of Jones AT&T Stadium. At the time of its purchase, this was reputedly the largest neon sign in existence.

=== Seal ===
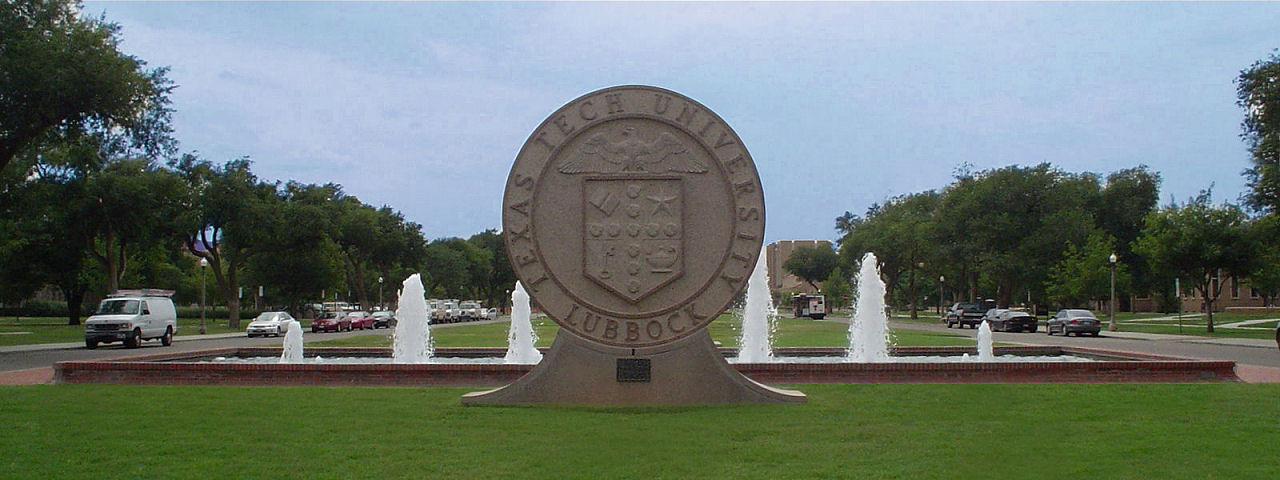
The seal at the campus' entrance

While the seal was originally designed in 1924 by William Ward Watkin, the Texas Tech seal did not even appear on diplomas until 1948, and was officially approved on 1953. The seal includes a lamp representing "school", a key representing "home", a book for "church", a lone star for Texas, and the eagle for the United States. The various cotton bolls stand for the area's strong cotton industry. On April 27, 1972, the 12 foot tall red granite seal was placed at the Broadway and University entrance to campus in what is now known as the Amon G. Carter Plaza.

== Miscellaneous ==
=== Bangin’ Bertha ===
Saddle Tramps carry Bangin Bertha, a bell on a trailer, to all home football games and homecoming events. Bertha was designed in 1959 by Saddle Tramp Joe Winegar, and was donated by the Santa Fe Railroad. Bangin' Bertha is considered a spirit-raiser and a big tradition at Texas Tech. On September 28, 2012, the Big 12 Conference banned artificial noisemakers while the ball is in play and then once the offense reaches the line of scrimmage. Failure to comply will result in a 15-yard penalty.

=== Guns Up ===
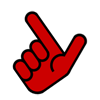
Guns Up!

The hand sign of Texas Tech is the "Guns Up". It is made by extending the index finger outward while extending the thumb upward and tucking in the middle, little and fourth fingers to form a gun to signify that the Red Raiders will shoot down their opponents. It acts as both a greeting and a sign of victory used by fans and players at athletic events. The sign was created in 1971 by Texas Tech alumnus L. Glenn Dippel, who was living in Austin and wanted an answer to the Hook 'em Horns sign used by University of Texas playerfans.

=== Texas Tech class ring ===
Texas Tech alumni ring

While the class ring had occasionally used a universal design, by the late 20th century various styles were available. In 1999, the university reverted to a single ring design for the university's graduates. The new Official Texas Tech Alumni Association Class Ring symbolically captures the essence of Texas Tech with the prominent Double T logo surrounded by the school's full name and date of foundation. By tradition, undergraduates wear the ring with the Double T logo facing themselves. Upon graduation, the ring is turned so the logo faces outward.

One shoulder of the ring displays an image of the Administration Building, with the bells which represent victory. The other shoulder contains the university seal: an American eagle perched above a book, representing the church; a star, representing the State of Texas; a key, representing home; and, a lamp, representing knowledge. These elements are separated by a cross featuring ten cotton bolls, one each for Lubbock and its nine surrounding cotton-producing counties.
