= List of Texas Tech University alumni =

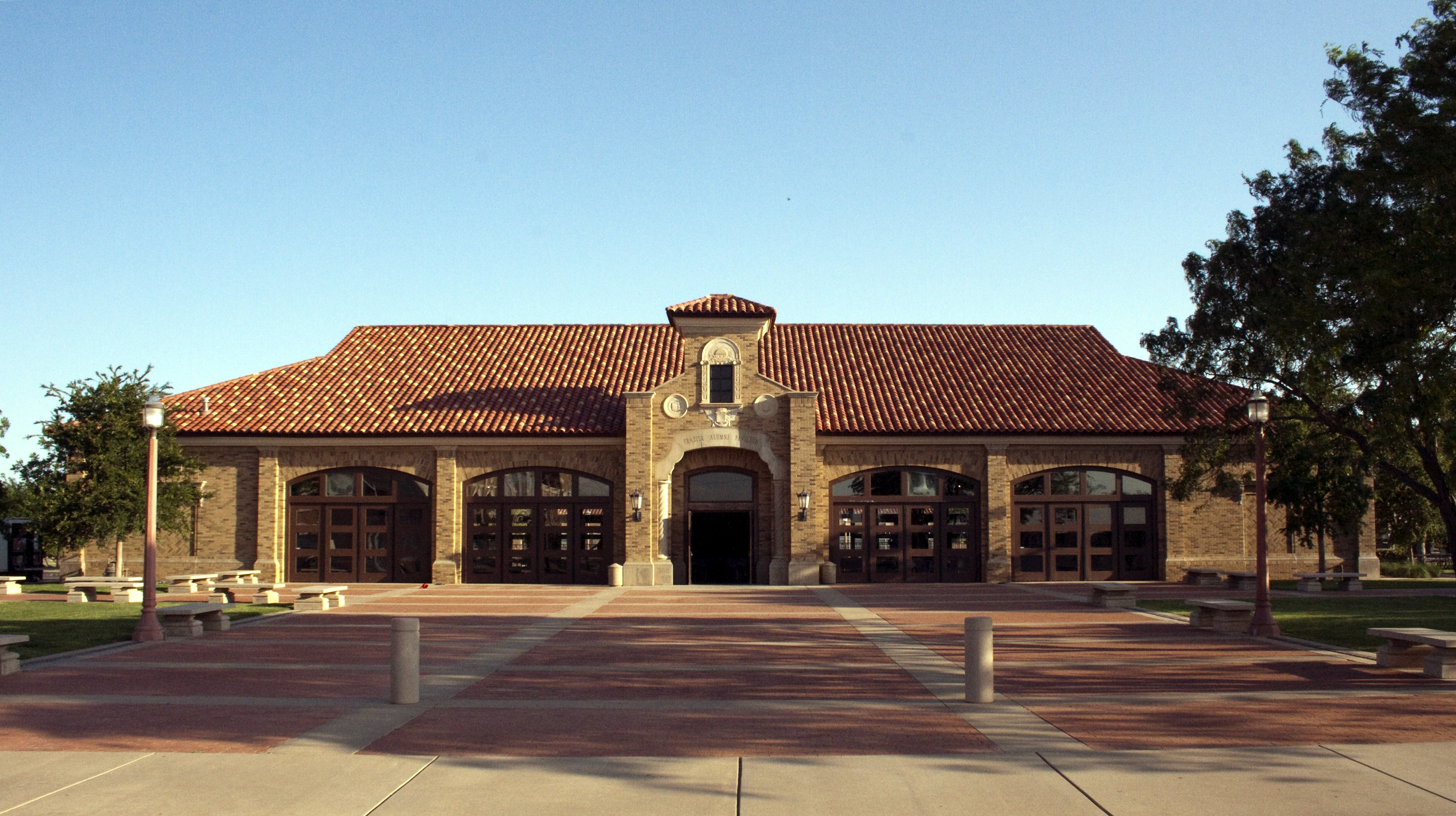
The Frazier Alumni Pavilion and Plaza

Texas Tech University, often referred to as Texas Tech or TTU, is a public, coeducational, research university located in Lubbock, Texas. Established on February 10, 1923, and originally known as Texas Technological College, it is the leading institution of the Texas Tech University System and has the sixth largest student body in the state of Texas. It is the only school in Texas to house an undergraduate institution, law school, and medical school at the same location. Initial enrollment in 1925 was 910 students; as of 2009, the university has 30,049 students from more than 110 countries, all 50 U.S. states and the District of Columbia. Since its first graduating class in 1927 of 26 students, Texas Tech has awarded more than 221,000 degrees, including 45,000 graduate and professional degrees to its alumni. The Texas Tech Alumni Association, with over 27,000 members, operates more than 120 chapters in cities throughout the United States and the world.

Throughout Texas Tech's history, alumni have played prominent roles in many fields. Among the university's distinguished alumni is Demetrio B. Lakas, president of the Republic of Panama from 1969 to 1978. Three United States governors, Daniel I. J. Thornton, governor of Colorado from 1951 to 1955, John Burroughs, governor of New Mexico from 1959 to 1961, and Preston Smith, governor of Texas from 1968 to 1972, are graduates of the university. Five astronauts, including Rick Husband, the final commander of Space Shuttle Columbia and recipient of the Congressional Space Medal of Honor. (Note: Astronaut Fact Book was last published by NASA in 2013. Joseph Acaba is a 2015 graduate of the College of Education.) U.S. Marine Corps Major and Medal of Honor recipient, George H. O'Brien Jr., is a distinguished alumnus. Richard E. Cavazos is a Medal of Honor and Distinguished Service Cross recipient and the first Hispanic and Mexican American to advance to the rank of four-star general in the U.S. Army. The school's influence on the business world is seen in such people as General Motors Chairman and CEO Edward Whitacre Jr., Finisar CEO Jerry S. Rawls, Belo Corporation CEO Dunia A. Shive, and ExxonMobil board member Angela Braly, ranked by Fortune magazine as the most powerful woman in business. Other alumni include folk rocker John Denver, country singer Pat Green, and actor George Eads. John Hinckley Jr., who attempted to assassinate U.S. President Ronald Reagan in 1981, attended the university sporadically from 1973 to 1980.

== Alumni ==
- "—" indicates that class year is unknown.
- To sort these tables by alumni or class year, click on the icon next to the column title.

=== Arts and literature ===
Name	Class year	Notability	References
Susan Budge	1983	Ceramic sculptor	
Rachel Caine	1985	Author	
Ruth Hurmence Green	1935	Author	
Grace Halsell	—	Writer	
Holly Hunt	—	Designer; founder and CEO of Holly Hunt Design	
Stephen Graham Jones	—	Author	
Anne Leaton	—	Author	
Ken Little	1970	Sculptor	
Jim Marrs	—	Author	
Douglas Moss	1990	Architect and founding partner of Holzman Moss Bottino Architecture	
Ruben Quesada	—	Poet	
Jodi Thomas	—	Author	
Robert Whitehill	—	Author	

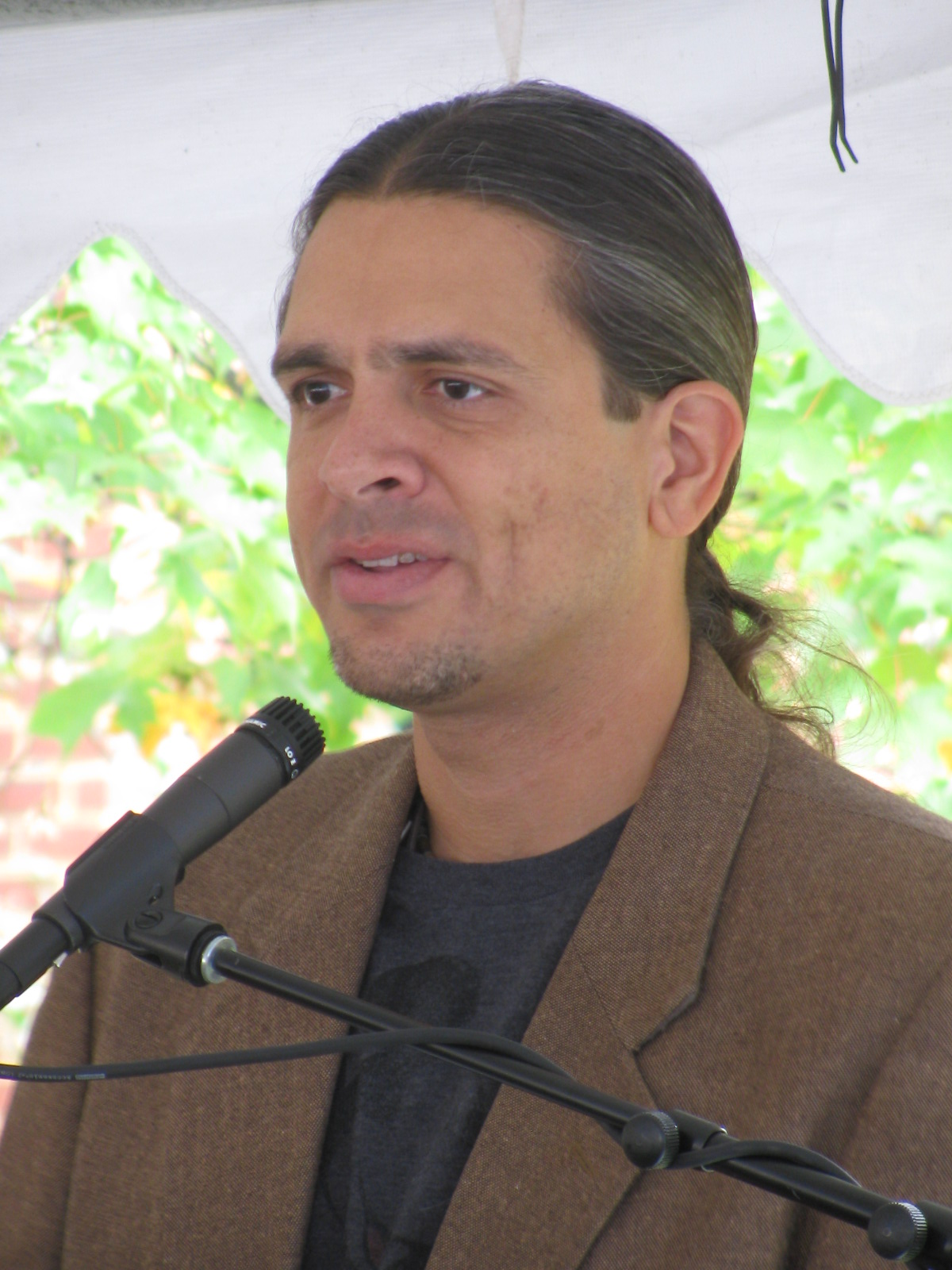
Stephen Graham Jones

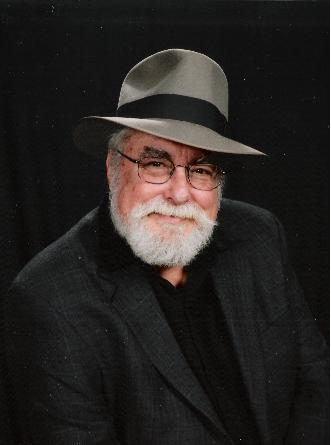
Jim Marrs

=== Business ===
Name	Class year	Notability	References
Hussein Al Uzri	1985	Head of the Trade Bank of Iraq	
Angela Braly (Note: Texas Tech Distinguished Alumni)	1982	Board member of ExxonMobil	
Cody Campbell	2005	Co-CEO of Double Eagle Holdings, an upstream oil and gas company; former Tech and NFL football player; member of the Texas Tech University System Board of Regents (2021–; chair, 2025–); major Tech athletics booster	
Richard L. Clemmer	1973	CEO, NXP Semiconductors; former CEO Agere Systems, the former Lucent semiconductor company	
Ed Cunningham	—		
Cindi Love	1984		
Robert Palmer	—	Former CEO, Digital Equipment Corporation	
Jerry S. Rawls	—	President and CEO, Finisar Corporation	
Charles "Tex" Thornton	1935	Founder and CEO, Litton Industries	
Sandra Campos	—	Former President and CEO, PetMeds	

=== Education ===
Name	Class year	Notability	References
G. Kemble Bennett	1970 (Ph.D.)	Two-term dean of the Look College of Engineering at Texas A&M University	
Robin E. Bowen	1988 (Ed.D.)	12th and current president of Arkansas Tech University	
David Christiansen	1984	8th chancellor of Penn State York	
Gerardine DeSanctis	1982	Thomas F. Keller Professor of Business Administration at Duke University	
Margaret Formby	1950	Founder of the National Cowgirl Museum and Hall of Fame	
Socorro Hernandez-Bernasconi	1970	Teacher and activist	
Michael Hinojosa	1979	Superintendent of Dallas Independent School District (2005–2011, 2015–present), Cobb County School District (2011–2014)	
Walter B. Huffman	1967 (B.A.), 1968 (M.Ed.), 1977 (J.D.)	Texas Tech University School of Law dean; former United States Army Judge Advocate General	
R. Duane Ireland	1969 (B.B.A.), 1971 (M.B.A.), 1977 (Ph.D.)	Former interim dean of Mays Business School at Texas A&M University	
Jeffry H. Larson	1980		
David J. Schmidly	1966 (B.A), 1968 (M.S.)	20th president of the University of New Mexico; former Texas Tech University president; former Oklahoma State University president	
Barry B. Thompson	—	10th chancellor of the Texas A&M University System	
Keith E. Whitfield	1987 (M.A.), 1989 (Ph.D.)	11th president of the University of Nevada, Las Vegas	

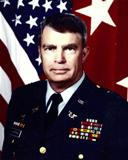
Walter B. Huffman

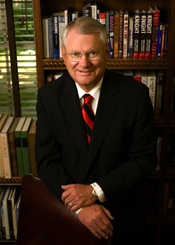
David J. Schmidly

=== Entertainment ===
Name	Class year	Notability	References
G. W. Bailey	1966	Actor	
Will Bigham	1998	Winner of the 2007 reality series On the Lot	
Todd Brunson	(did not graduate)	Professional poker player	
Jerry "Bo" Coleman	—	Radio broadcaster in Lubbock; currently at KDAV AM	
Barry Corbin	1964	Actor	
Dayna Devon	(did not graduate)	Journalist	
Colby Donaldson	1996	Actor, reality TV personality, runner-up on Survivor: The Australian Outback	
George Eads	1989	Actor	
Andy Fickman	—	Film director	
Johnny Hardwick	—	Comedian; voice actor	
Anne Hudson	1999	Radio and TV personality	
Brad Leland	1980	Actor	
Michael Morrison	—	Actor	
Keith Samples	1977	Writer, producer	
William Shockley	—	Actor	
Jordan Smith	2008 (M.A.)	Conductor	
Jack Tippit	1947	Cartoonist	
Alexis Tipton	2008	Voice actress	

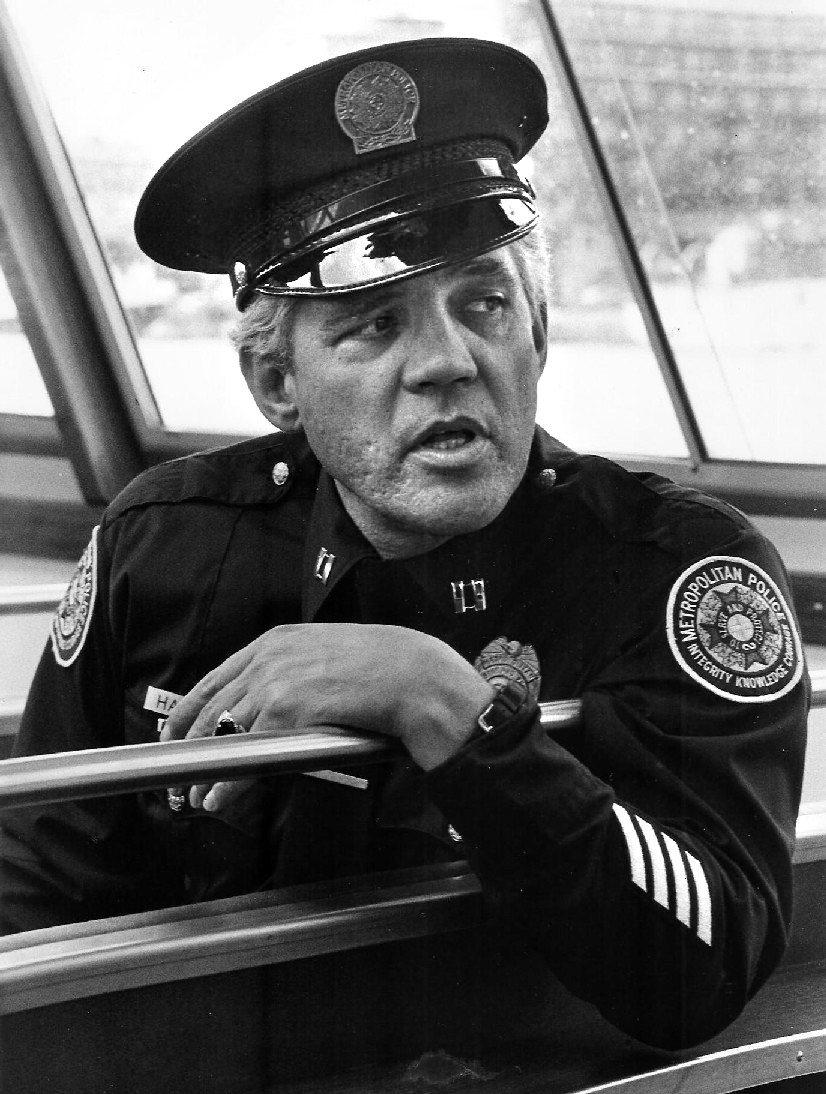
G.W. Bailey

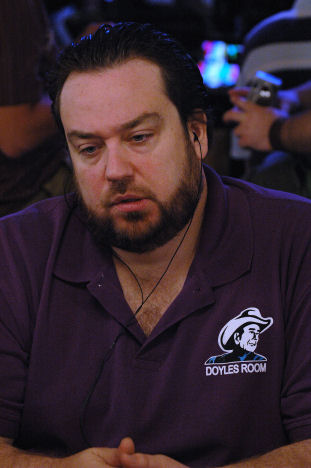
Todd Brunson

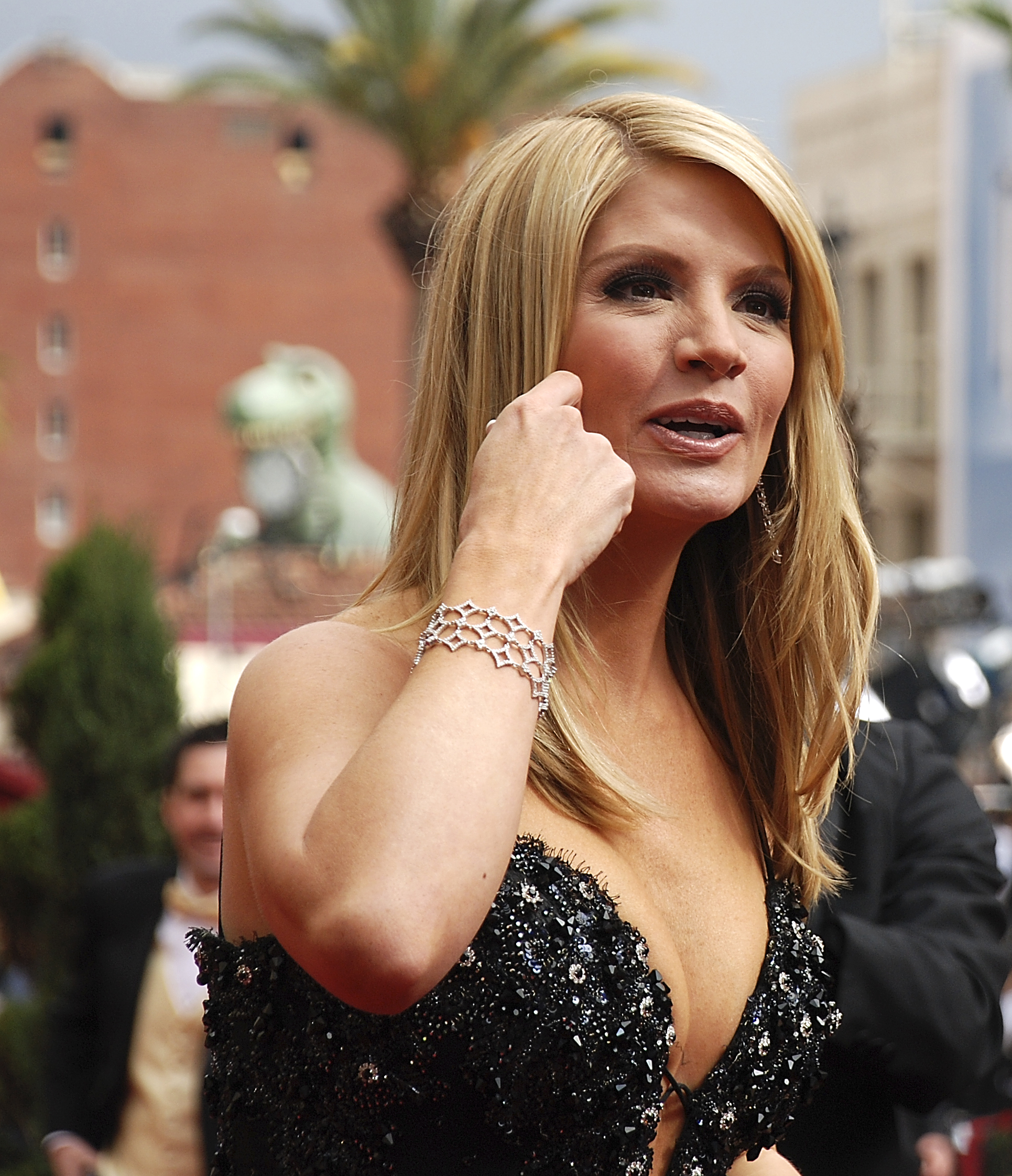
Dayna Devon

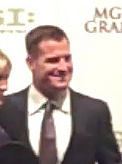
George Eads

=== Government, law, and public policy ===
Name	Class year	Notability	References
Jodey Arrington	1994 (B.S.), 1997 (M.P.A.)	Former chief of staff, Federal Deposit Insurance Corporation; current chief of staff, Texas Tech University System; distinguished alumnus, MPA program	
Bob Bullock	1955	Former lieutenant governor of Texas; former Texas comptroller	
John Burroughs	1929	Former governor of New Mexico	
Dustin Burrows	2004	Texas state representative, District 83 (2014– ), and speaker of the Texas House of Representatives (2025– )	
Waggoner Carr	1940	Former Texas attorney general	
Joel Carson III	1994	U.S. Circuit Court judge, United States Court of Appeals for the 10th Circuit	
John Carter	1964	United States representative, Texas District 31	
Lauro Cavazos	1949 (B.S.), 1951 (M.S.)	Former Texas Tech University president; former U.S. Secretary of Education	
Tim Cole	(did not graduate)	First person in Texas to be posthumously acquitted of a crime based on DNA evidence; namesake of the Tim Cole Compensation Act of Texas	
Louis Conradt	—	Attorney	
Kilmer B. Corbin	—	Former Texas state senator, District 28	
Tom Craddick	1965	Texas state representative, District 82	
Samuel Ray Cummings	1967	United States district court judge, Northern District of Texas	
James G. Denton	1938	Associate justice, Texas Supreme Court	
Robert L. Duncan	1976	Texas state senator, District 28	
William Royal Furgeson Jr.	1964	United States district court judge, Western District of Texas	
Ruben Garcia Jr.	1973	Former executive assistant director, Federal Bureau of Investigation	
Millard Hall	—	Journalist and political consultant; served as press secretary to Texas Governor Preston Smith; instrumental in the creation of the Texas Film Commission	
Kent Hance	1965	Former United States representative, Texas District 19; Texas Tech University System chancellor	
Harvey Hilderbran	1983	Texas state representative, District 53 from Kerrville	
John Hinckley Jr.	(did not graduate)	Attempted assassin of United States President Ronald Reagan	
John Hodgson	1984	Kentucky state representative	
Phil Johnson	1975	Texas Supreme Court justice, Place 8	
Delwin Jones	1949	Texas state representative, District 83	
Robert A. Junell	1969	Senior status United States district court judge, Western District of Texas	
Jim Keffer	1975	Texas state representative from District 60	
Demetrio B. Lakas	1963	Former president of the Republic of Panama	
Pete Laney	1965	Former Texas state representative	
W. Mark Lanier	1984	Attorney	
Tom Martin	1970	Former mayor of Lubbock, Texas	
Jim McReynolds	1987 (J.D.)	Texas state representative, District 12	
Tibor P. Nagy	1972	Former United States ambassador to Ethiopia, Guinea	
Randy Neugebauer	1972	United States representative, Texas District 19	
Charles Perry	1984	Texas state senator, District 28	
Edward Rappaport	1988	Deputy director, National Hurricane Center	
Ron Reynolds		Member of the Texas House of Representatives from Missouri City since 2011	
Lionel Rivera	1979	Mayor of Colorado Springs, Colorado	
Bill Sarpalius	1972	Former Texas state senator, District 31; former United states representative, Texas District 13	
Clay Sell	1989	Former deputy secretary, United States Department of Energy	
Preston Smith	1934	Former governor of Texas	
John T. Smithee	1976 (J.D.)	Texas state representative, District 86 from Amarillo	
Burt Solomons	1977	Texas state representative, District 65	
Paul Stanley	1985	Former Tennessee state senator, District 31	
Charles Stenholm	1961 (B.S.), 1962 (M.S.)	Former United States representative, Texas District 17	
Karen Tandy	1974, 1977	Former administrator, Drug Enforcement Administration	
Elmer Tarbox	1939	Texas state representative, District 76	Carl Tepper
Carl Tepper		Texas state representative, 84th district	
Mac Thornberry	1980	United States representative, Texas District 13	
Dan Thornton	1932	Former governor of Colorado	
T. John Ward	1964	United States district court judge, Eastern District of Texas	
Elizabeth Watson	1971	Former chief of police, Houston Police Department	
Joseph M. Watt	1971	Oklahoma Supreme Court justice, 9th District	
Jeff Wentworth	1972 (J.D.)	Texas state senator, District 25	
John C. White	1946	Former chairman of the Democratic National Committee	

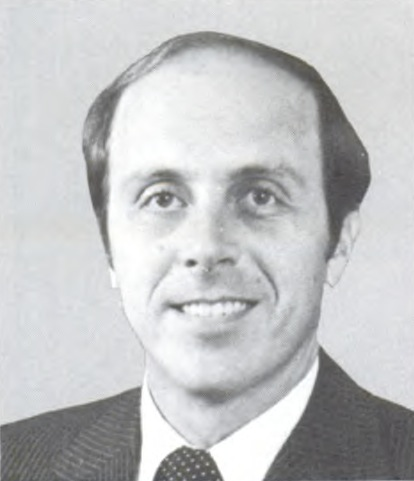
Kent Hance

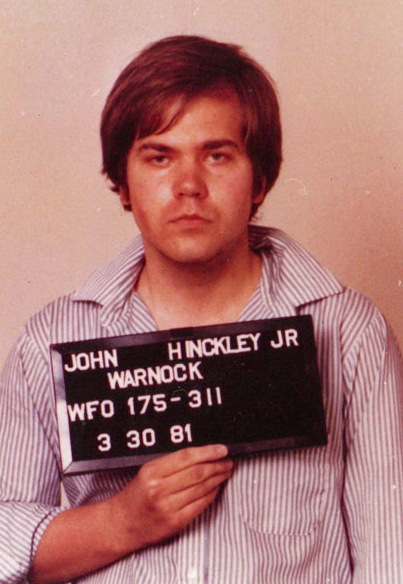
John Hinckly Jr.

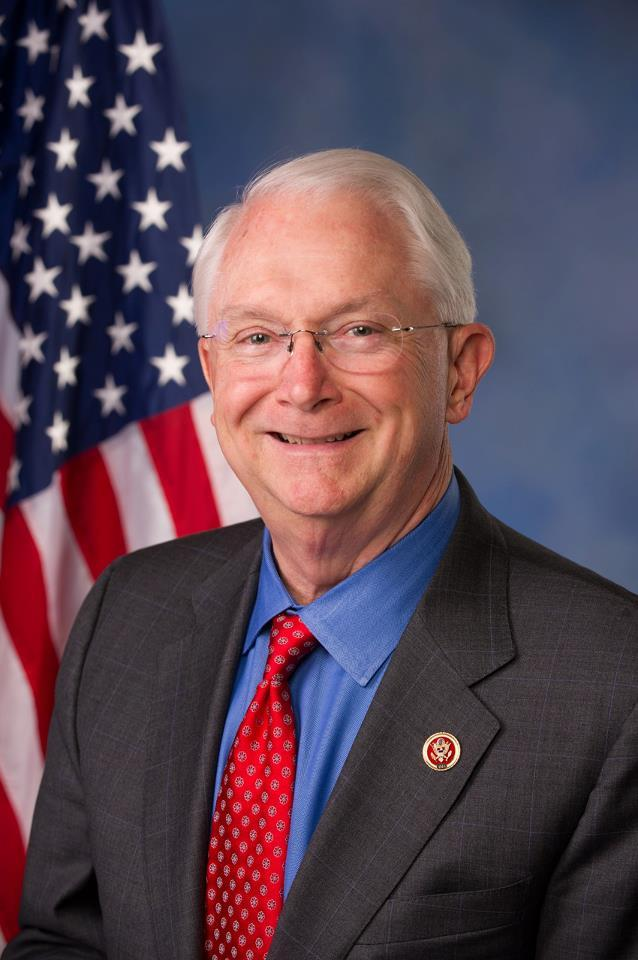
Randy Neugebauer

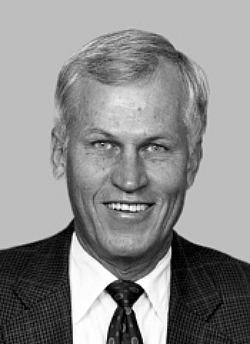
Charles Stenholm

=== Journalism and media ===
Name	Class year	Notability	References
Jim Angle	1969	Fox News chief Washington correspondent	
Emily Jones	1998	Fox Sports Net anchor and reporter	
Wyman Meinzer	1974	State photographer of Texas	
Robert Montemayor	1975	1978 George Polk Award, Local Reporting, Dallas Times Herald; 1984 Pulitzer Prize, Public Service Award, Los Angeles Times	
Scott Pelley	1978	Journalist, former anchor and managing editor for CBS Evening News; 60 Minutes correspondent	
Herbert Southworth	—	Journalist	
Dirk West	1954	Cartoonist, journalist	

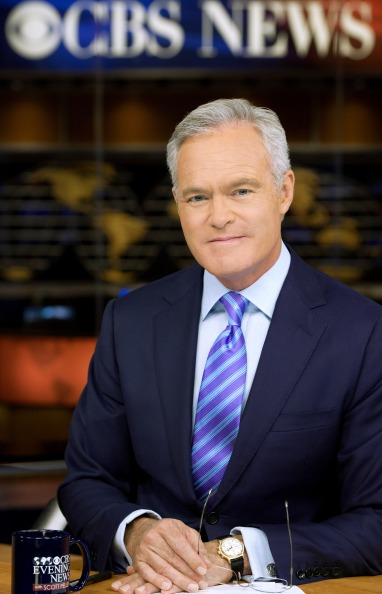
Scott Pelley

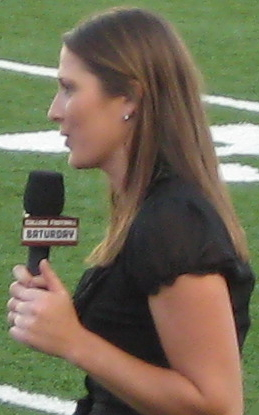
Emily Jones

=== Military ===
Name	Class year	Notability	References
John D. Alexander	1982	Assistant commander of Navy Personnel Command for Career Management (PERS-4)	
Charles Q. Brown	1985	21st chairman of the Joint Chiefs of Staff; former 22nd chief of staff of the United States Air Force, first African-American to become a service chief	
Richard E. Cavazos	1951	First Hispanic 4-star general in the U.S. Army; commander United States Army Forces Command (FORSCOM)	
Robert T. Clark	1970	Lieutenant general; commander, 5th Army	
Fred E. Ellis	1967	Major general, Texas Air National Guard	
Wendy M. Masiello	1980	One of the highest-ranking women in the United States Department of Defense	
George H. O'Brien Jr.	1950	Major, USMCR, Medal of Honor recipient	
Herman C. Wallace	—	Private first class, United States Army, Medal of Honor recipient	
Leonard Wong	—	Professor of Military Strategy in the Strategic Studies Institute at the U.S. Army War College; author on military leadership	

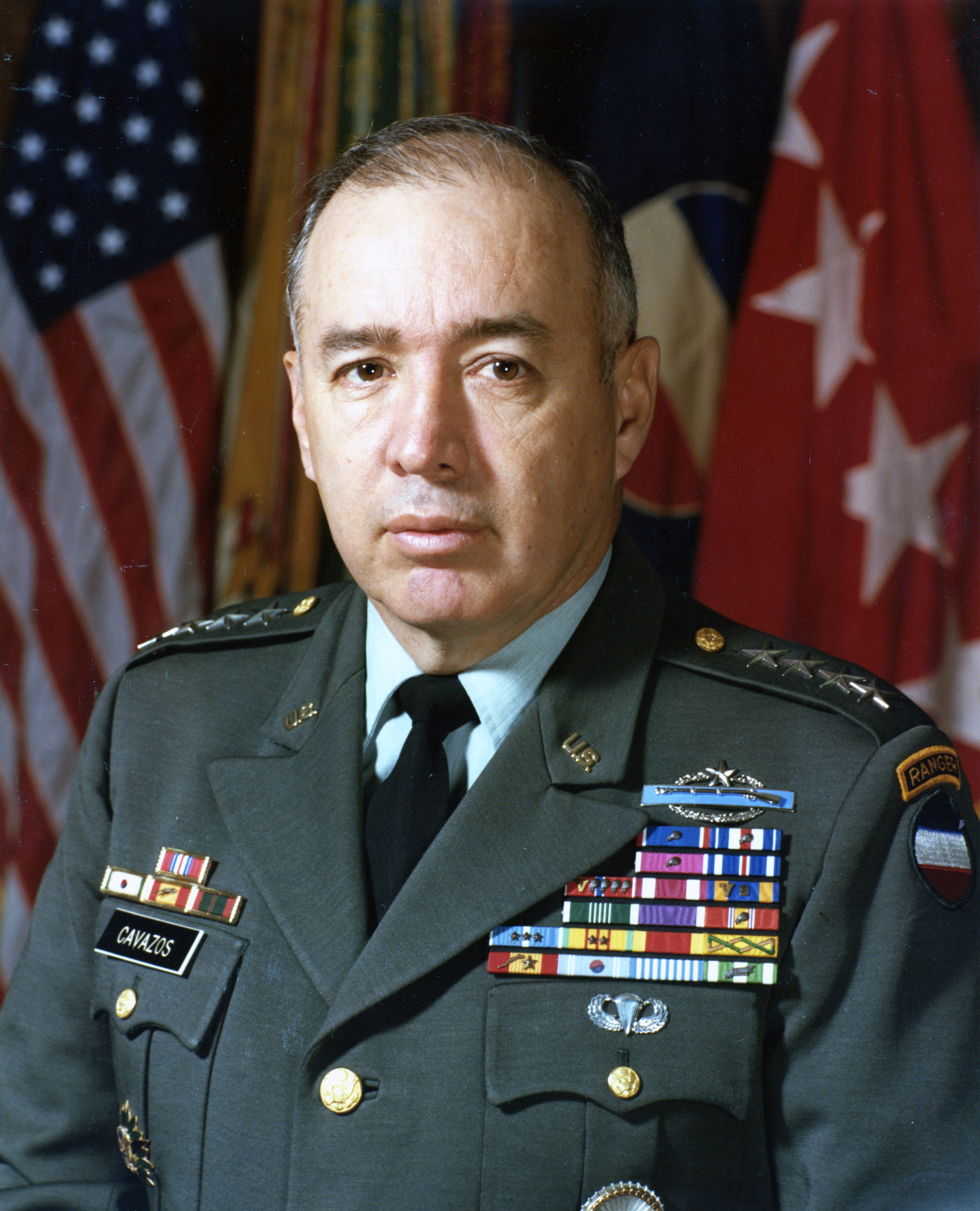
Richard E. Cavazos

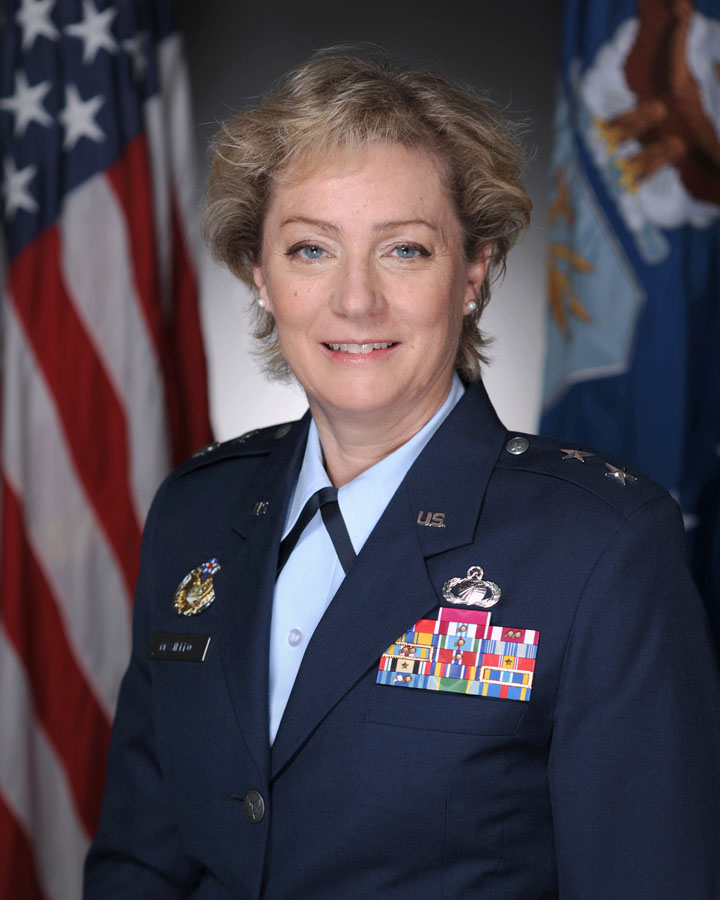
Wendy M. Masiello

=== Music ===
Name	Class year	Notability	References
Josh Abbott	—	Singer, songwriter	
Jerry Allison	—	Drummer (Buddy Holly and The Crickets, Jerry Allison and The Crickets)	
Ponty Bone	—		
Wade Bowen	—	Singer, songwriter	
Cleto Cordero	—	Singer, songwriter	
John Denver	1961	Singer, actor	
Ralna English	—	Singer	
Jimmy Dale Gilmore	—	Singer	
Susan Graham	1983	Mezzo-soprano	
Pat Green	1997	Singer	
William Clark Green		Singer, songwriter	
Virgil Johnson	—	Musician	
Bob Livingston	—	Singer, songwriter	
Lloyd Maines	—	Music producer, musician and songwriter	
Natalie Maines	(did not graduate)	Singer, songwriter	
Cory Morrow	1992	Singer, songwriter	
Timothy Rhea	—	Director of bands at Texas A&M University	
Doug Smith	—		
Jordan Randall Smith	—	Conductor	
Lane Turner	—	Singer, songwriter	

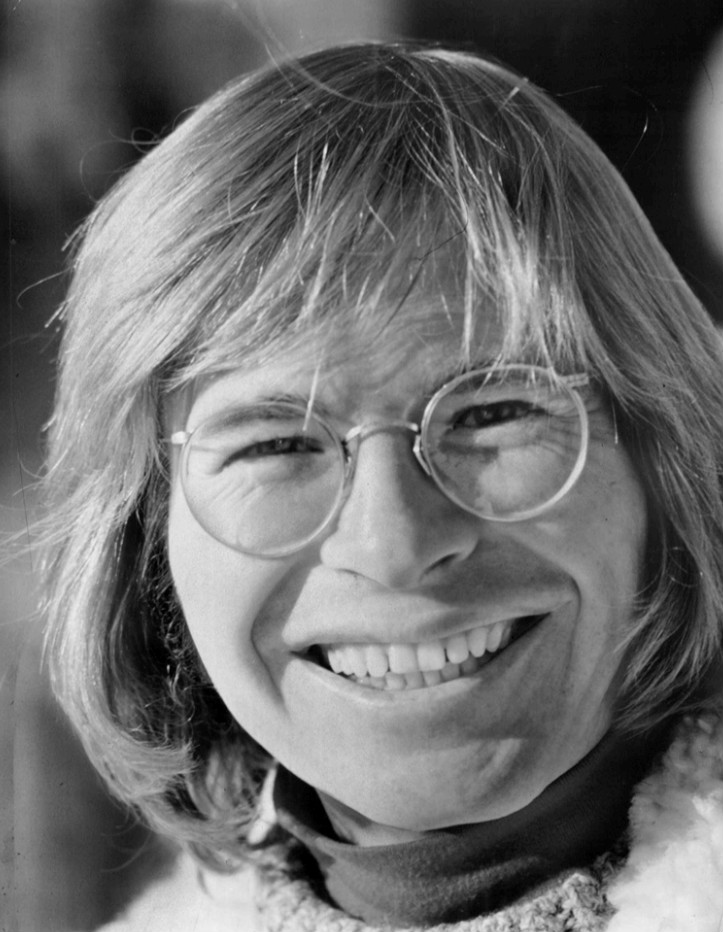
John Denver

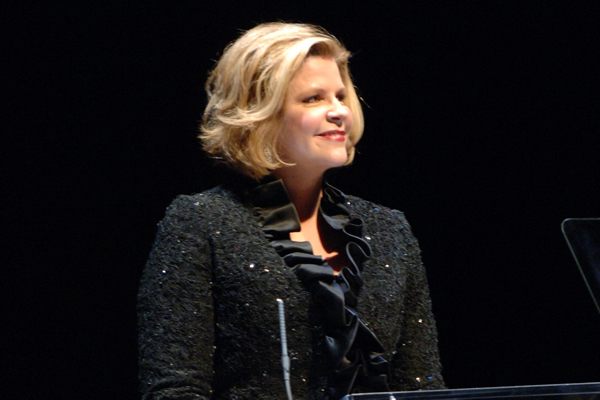
Susan Graham

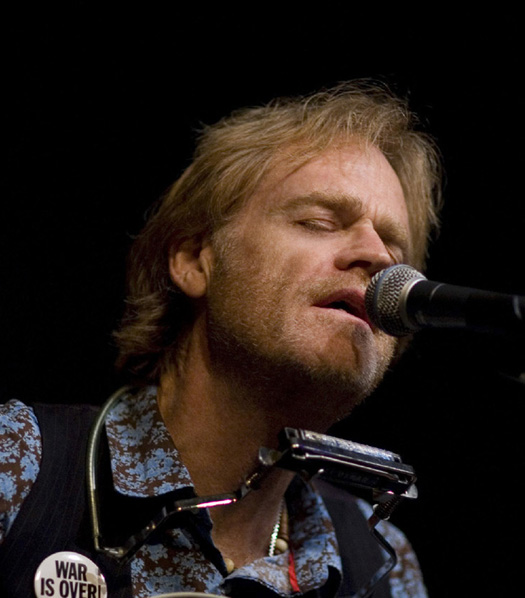
Bob Livingston

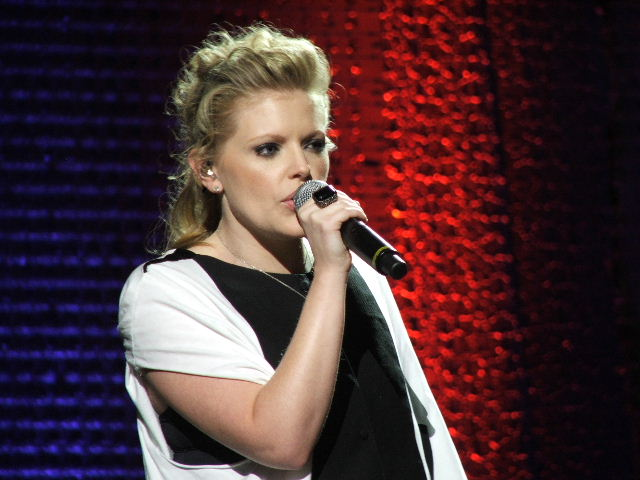
Natalie Maines

=== Science, technology and medicine ===
Name	Class year	Notability	References
Joseph M. Acaba	2015	Astronaut	
Charles Bassett	1960	Astronaut	
Mica Endsley	1982	First female and former chief scientist of the United States Air Force	
Grandmaster Ratte'	—	Hacker; co-founder of Cult of the Dead Cow	
Ashawna Hailey	—	Computer scientist; creator of HSPICE	
Rick Husband	1980	Former astronaut	
Ginger Kerrick	1993	First non-astronaut capsule communicator (Capcom), first Russian-training-integration instructor, and first Hispanic female NASA flight director at NASA	
Paul Lockhart	1978	Astronaut	
Benjamin F. Logan	—		
Timothy P. Marshall	1980, 1983 (M.S.)	Civil engineer and meteorologist; damage analysis expert	
Francis Muguet	1992 (Ph.D.)	Chemist, information freedom advocate	
Arati Prabhakar	1979 (B.S)	Director of DARPA; first female director of the National Institute of Standards and Technology	
Erik N. Rasmussen	1982 (M.S.)	Atmospheric scientist, tornadogenesis expert	
Nick Tredennick	1968 (B.S.), 1970 (M.S.)	Electrical engineer	
Steven L. West	2000	Disability researcher	
Joe Ben Wheat	(did not graduate)	Archaeologist	
Bradford P. Wilcox	1980 (B.S.), 1983 (M.S.)	Ecohydrologist and professor	
Terry Yates	1978	Biologist	

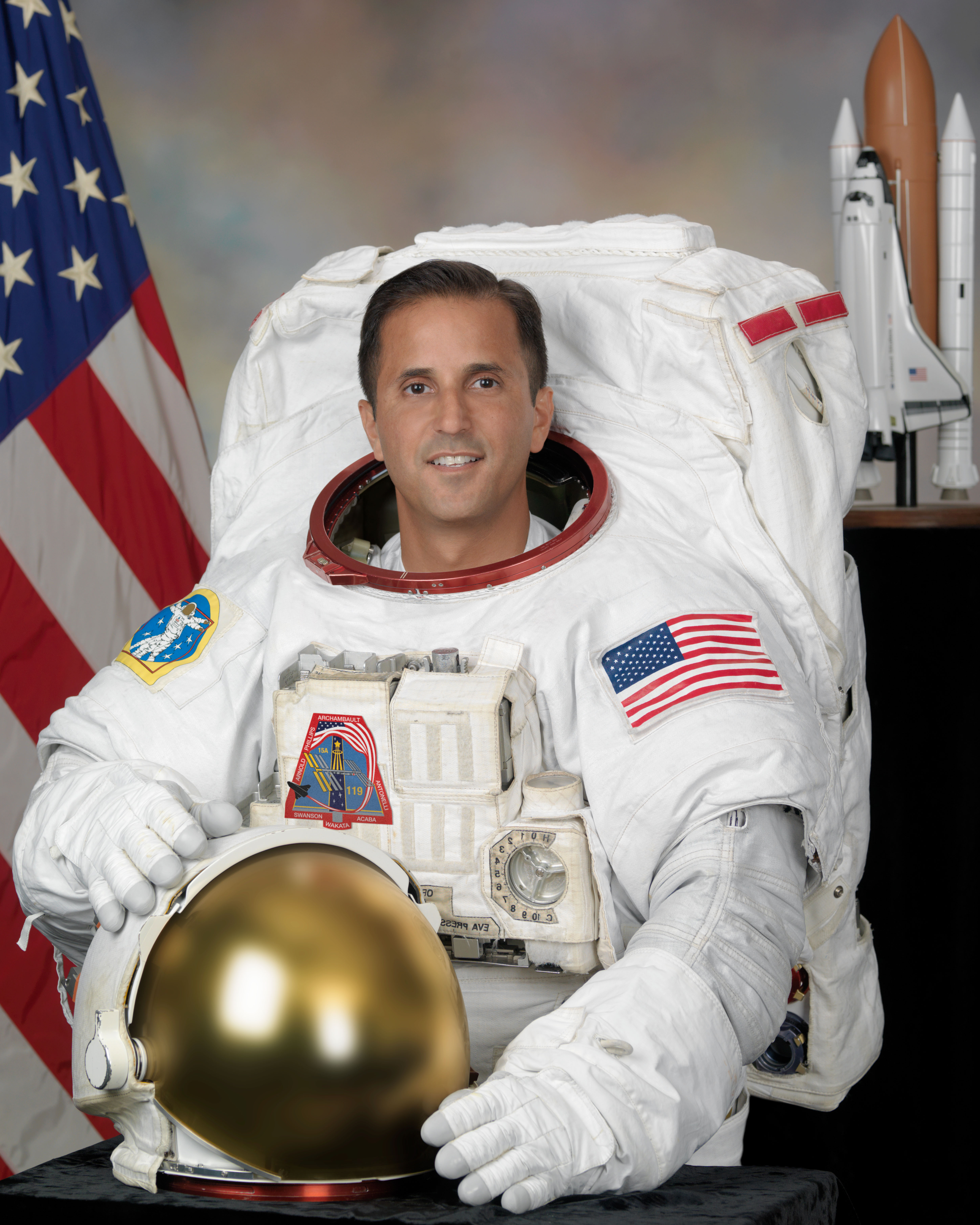
Joseph Acaba

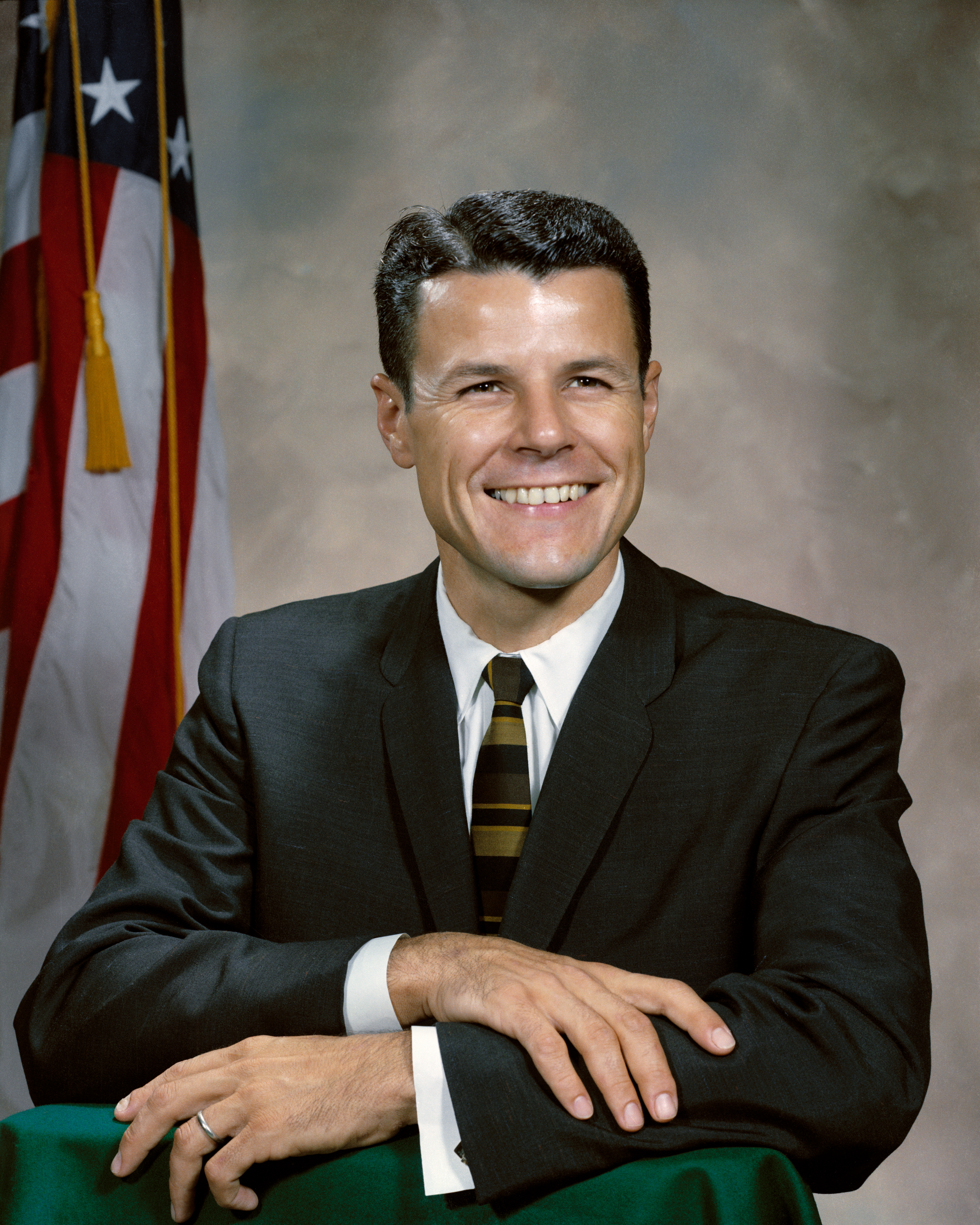
Charles Bassett

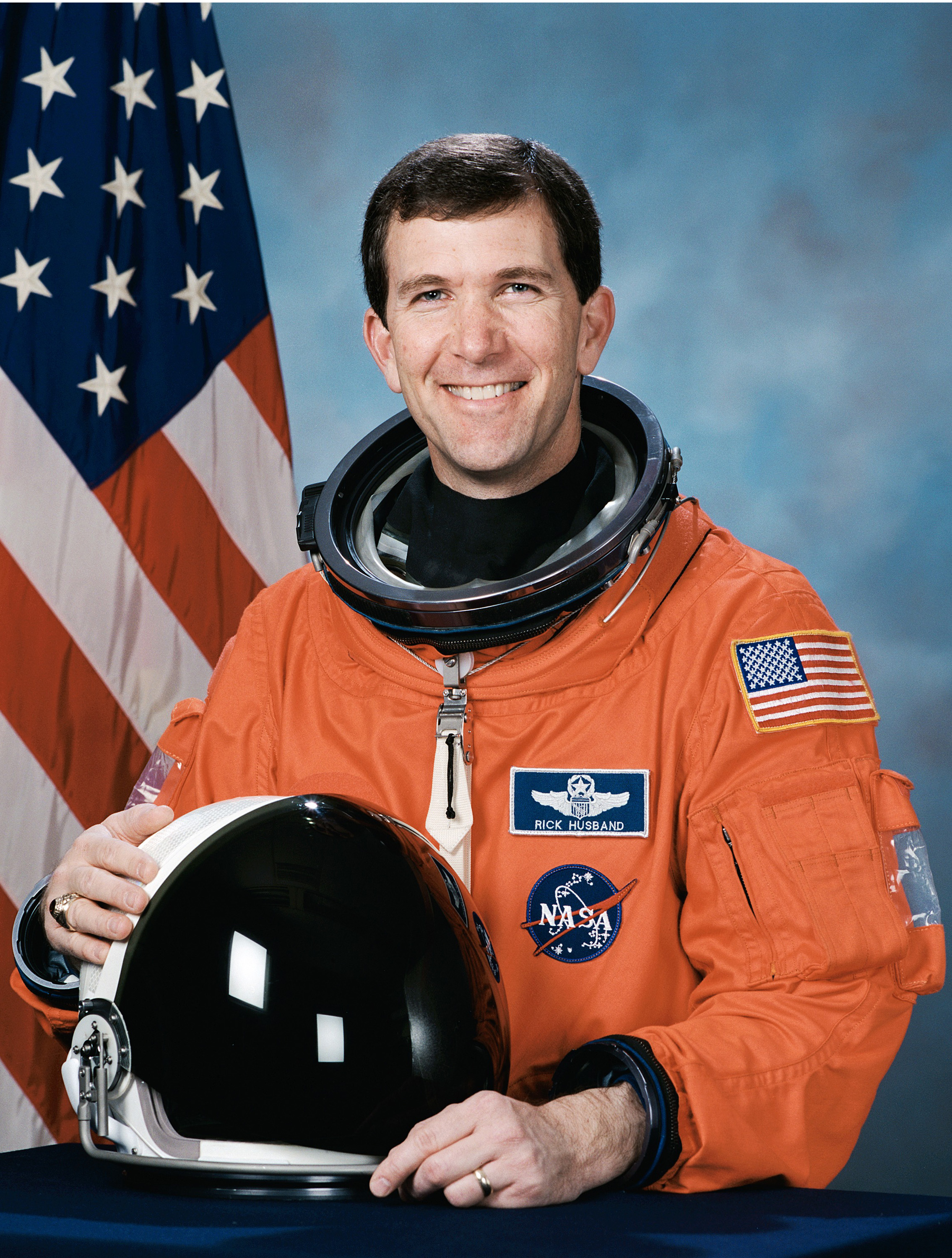
Rick Husband

=== Honorary ===
Name	Class year	Notability	References
John W. Carpenter	1940	Former Texas Tech Board of Regents member	
Amon G. Carter	1930	Former Texas Tech Board of Regents member	
Tom C. Clark	1947	United States Supreme Court justice and United States attorney general	
Glenna Goodacre	—	Sculptor	
Fred Gurley	1953	President of Atchison, Topeka and Santa Fe Railway	
Kent Hance	2005	Former United States representative, Texas District 19; Texas Tech University System chancellor	
Susan Polgar	2007	Former world chess champion	
Daniel I.J. Thornton	1953	Former Colorado governor	
Andre Waismann	2000	Medical practitioner, notable for development of the ANR treatment of opiate addiction	

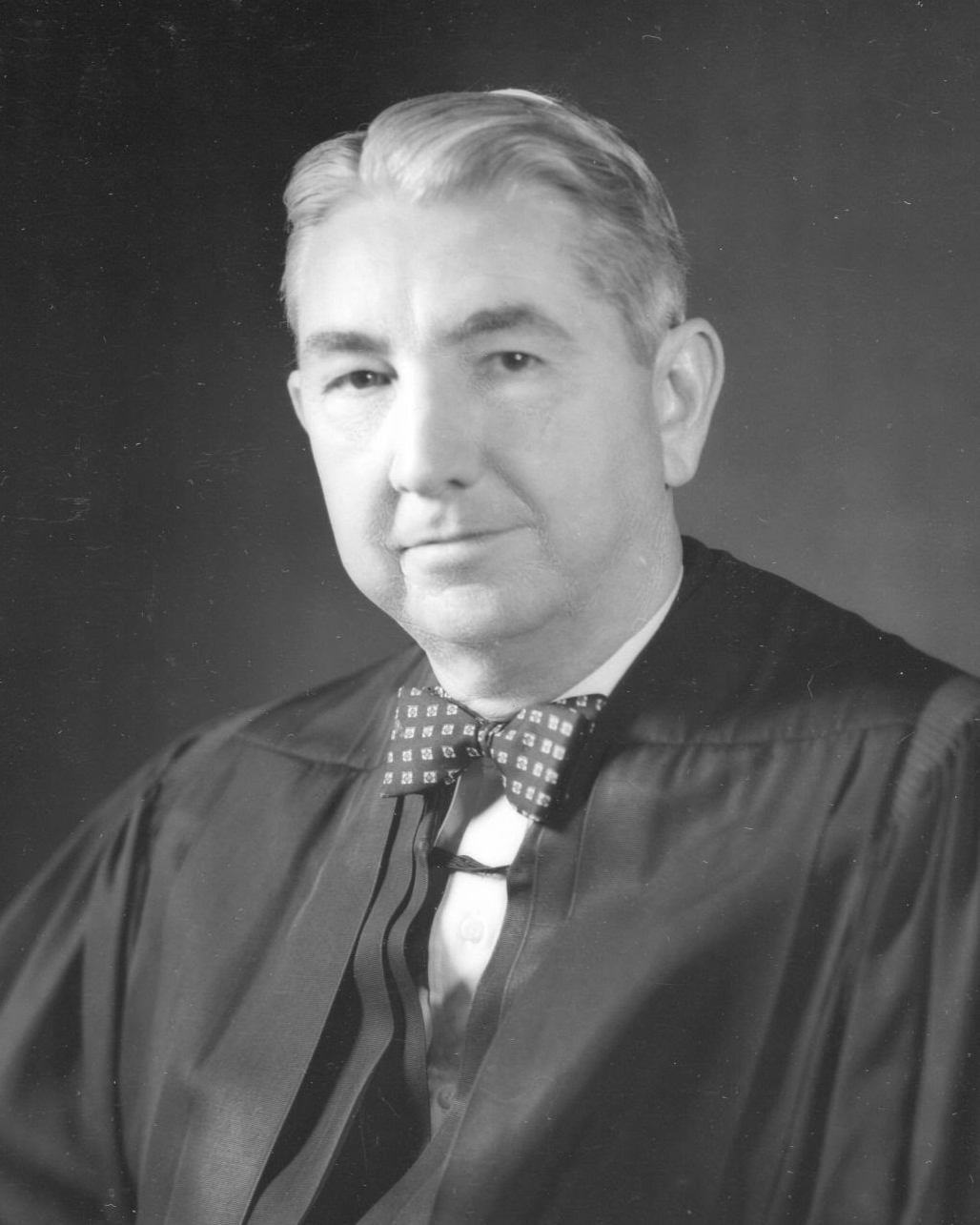
Tom C. Clark

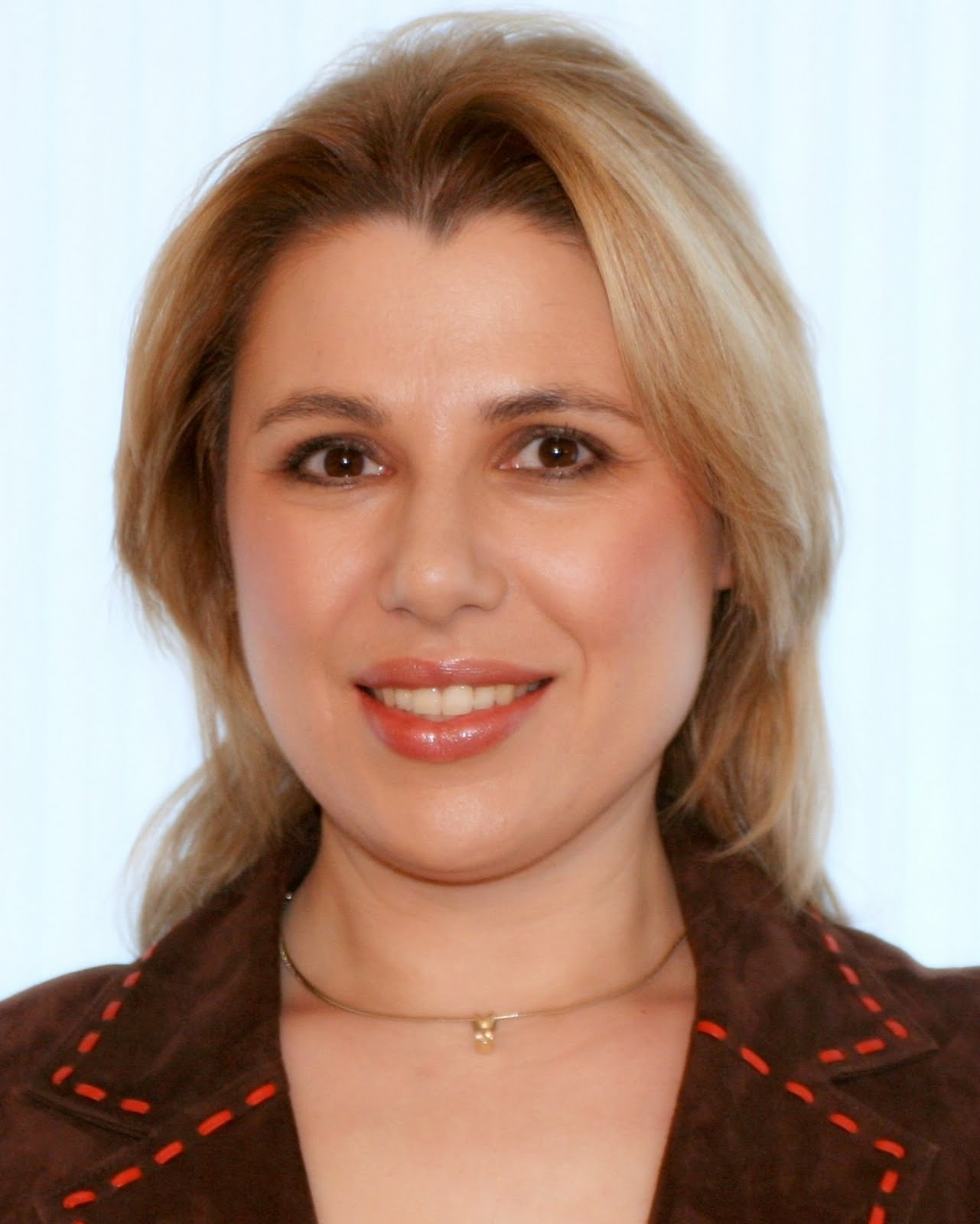
Susan Polgar

=== Sports ===
Texas Tech University alumni have also made contributions to various sports. Former Red Raiders have gone on to compete in the Canadian Football League (CFL), Major League Baseball (MLB), National Basketball League (NBA), National Football League (NFL), PGA Tour, and Women's National Basketball Association (WNBA). Approximately 94 alumni have been selected to the MLB draft, 19 alumni have been selected in the NBA draft, 149 have been selected in the NFL draft, and nine have been selected in the WNBA draft. Texas Tech alumni have also gone on to coach collegiate and professional teams.

== See also ==
- List of sportspeople educated at Texas Tech University
