= Sandra Campos =

American fashion business executive (born 1973)

- Born: Sandra Y. Campos; 1973 (age 52–53); California, U.S.
- Citizenship: American
- Education: Texas Tech University
- Occupations: Business executive, entrepreneur
- Notable work: President & CEO of PetMed Express (2024–2025); CEO of Diane von Furstenberg (2018–2020); Group President of Global Brands Group(2015-2018)
- Board member of: Big Lots, PDS Limited, Fabric Commerce, Daniel's Jewelers, PureRED, PetMed Express and Narvar

Sandra Y. Campos, commonly referred to as Sandra Campos (born 1973), is an American business executive, and entrepreneur. She is best known for her roles as the former President & CEO and Board Member of the fashion brand Diane von Furstenberg and the former President & CEO and Board Member of PetMed Express. She initially rose to prominence in the fashion and retail industries through her executive positions at Polo Ralph Lauren and Nautica, and later as the Co-President of Global Brands Group. Along with business partner, Anthony Thomas Melillo (ATM, Tony Melillo) she co-founded the first celebrity brand management firm for teens, Cynosure Holdings, and partnered with Selena Gomez to launch her first global lifestyle brand "Dream Out Loud".

She was a regular contributor on CNBC, providing commentary on retail trends, consumer behavior, and e-commerce between 2020-2024. In 2019, she was included in Latino Leaders Magazine's "Top 100 Latina Leaders"; and in 2019 was named among the "Top Leaders in Business" by Hispanic Executive. In 2020, she was recognized on the "Most Powerful Latinas" list by ALPFA. In 2020, she was named a "Top Woman in Retail" by the Women in Retail Leadership Circle, and in 2023 received the Frontline Excellence Award from YOOBIC. In 2025, she received the Maestro Award for entrepreneurship in NYC, the YMCA NYC Vida Award for Leadership and was recognized as a Forbes 50 over 50 recipient in 2025.

== Background ==
Campos was born in California to Mexican immigrant parents, and was raised in a suburb of Dallas, Texas, as the second of six children. Her mother is from Mexico City and her father is from Zacatecas.

Her family established a tortilla manufacturing business in Texas, where Campos was exposed to commercial operations from an early age. Her mother utilized a specific grade-based financial reward system to motivate her children which influenced Campos's life on the importance of education and financial independence.

As a first-generation Mexican American, Campos navigated distinct cultural and linguistic pressures while growing up in the United States. In an interview with GirlTalkHQ, Campos said how she was inspired by pride of her eldest daughter, Grace, for their indigenous and Mexican ancestry and in turn learned to embrace her cultural heritage.

Campos attended Texas Tech University, where she graduated with a Bachelor of Science. Initially aspiring to be a fashion designer, she frequently made clothes for her friends and sisters. While in college, Campos made and sold clothes she designed. Following graduation, she relocated to New York City to pursue her career.

== Career ==
After moving to New York, Campos began her career in retail at J. McLaughlin and J.G. Hook and had to work three jobs in her first years in order to afford life in New York. Subsequently, she joined Donna Karan, where she played a key role in the launch and market expansion of the contemporary DKNY collection. Over the following decade, Campos held senior management positions for apparel companies including Polo Ralph Lauren, Nautica, and licensed operations for Oscar de la Renta. She also co-founded a consumer products brand, Mobi, that developed stylish storage bags for families with young kids. The brand was sold in retailers across 16 countries and was featured across national media such as Oprah and InStyle.

In 2009, she had three young children and transitioned into entrepreneurship by co-founding Cynosure Holdings, the first celebrity brand management company. Through this venture, she partnered with Anthony Thomas Melillo (Tony Melillo) and actress and singer Selena Gomez to launch "Dream Out Loud," the actress’s first lifestyle brand that achieved over $100 million in annual retail sales and included global licenses across fourteen categories including apparel, footwear, sleepwear, accessories among others.

In 2015, Campos was named Co-President of Women's Apparel at Global Brands Group. In this capacity, she managed a portfolio of six brands which included licensed contemporary labels such as Juicy Couture, Bebe, BCBG, Herve Leger, Buffalo, and Tretorn. She notably engineered the brand revitalization of Juicy Couture alongside celebrity stylist, Jamie Mizrahi.

While serving at Bebe, Campos developed a close professional collaboration and personal friendship with fashion designer Nathan Jenden, who had spent a decade as a central figure at Diane von Furstenberg's brand. When von Furstenberg approached Jenden to return and help revitalize her brand, Jenden invited Campos. The meeting resulted in the dual appointment of Campos as CEO of Diane von Furstenberg's brand and Jenden's return as Chief Design Officer and Vice President of Creative in April 2018.

In 2019, she was named among the Top Leaders in Business by Hispanic Executive magazine. She was also included in Latino Leaders magazine's Top 100 Latina Leaders from 2019 through 2025.

In 2019, she opened Sugar Bear Farm, a horse sanctuary in New York’s Hudson Valley. Sugar Bear Farm homes rescued horses, dogs, and cats.

After her tenure at DVF ended in late 2020, Campos focused on retail technology and board service. She became a board member and interim CEO of Project Verte, a retail technology and cloud-based supply chain solutions provider.

During 2020, she was recognized as a Top Woman in Retail by the Women in Retail Leadership Circle. In 2020, she was also named among the Most Powerful Latinas by the Association of Latino Professionals For America.

In April 2024, Campos was named President and CEO of PetMed Express (PetMeds), a publicly traded online pet pharmacy and healthcare provider. Before her appointment as CEO, she had served on the company's board of directors since May 2023. In 2023, she was recognized at the Frontline Excellence Awards by YOOBIC.
