= List of presidents of Texas Tech University =

This is a complete list of Texas Tech University presidents of Texas Tech University in Lubbock, Texas.

== Presidents ==
Legend
Int.	Interim
^{†}	Texas Tech University alumni

#	Name	Term	Notability
1	Paul W. Horn	1923–1932	Former National Education Association (NEA) Vice-president. Died in office.
2	Bradford Knapp	1932–1938	Former president of Oklahoma Agricultural and Mechanical College (now Oklahoma State University) and Alabama Polytechnic Institute (now Auburn University). Second Texas Tech president to die in office.
Int.	Mrs. John A. Haley^{†}	1938	Board of Director member who served as interim following Knapp's passing.
3	Clifford B. Jones	1938–1944	The football stadium at the university (now Galaxy Stadium) was named in part for him.
4	William Whyburn	1944–1948	
5	Dossie M. Wiggins	1948–1952	Also president of Texas Western (now the University of Texas at El Paso) prior to his arrival.
6	Edward N. Jones	1952–1959	Also president of Texas A&I (now Texas A&M University-Kingsville) prior to his arrival.
7	Robert C. Goodwin	1959–1966	
8	Grover E. Murray	1966–1976	
9	M. Cecil Mackey	1976–1979	
Int.	Lawrence Graves	1979	Interim
10	Lauro Cavazos^{†}	1980–1988	
11	Robert W. Lawless	1989–1996	
12	Donald R. Haragan	1996—2000	
13	David J. Schmidly^{†}	2000–2003	
Int.	Donald R. Haragan	2003	Second tenure. Interim.
14	Jon Whitmore	2003–2008	
15	Guy Bailey	2008–2012	
Int.	Lawrence Schovanec	2012–2013	Interim
16	M. Duane Nellis	2013–2016	Former University of Idaho president
Int.	John Opperman^{†}	2016	Interim
17	Lawrence Schovanec	2016–present	
