= Vetster =

Canadian veterinary telemedicine company

Vetster Inc.
- Industry: Veterinary services
- Founded: 2020; 6 years ago
- Founder: Mark Bordo, Regan Johnson
- Headquarters: Toronto, Canada
- Area served: USA, Canada, UK, Worldwide
- Website: vetster.com

Vetster Inc. is a Canadian veterinary telemedicine company headquartered in Toronto, Canada.

== History ==
Vetster was founded in 2020 by Mark Bordo and Regan Johnson. Bordo assumed the role of CEO and Johnson was appointed CTO. Cerys Goodall was named Chief Operating Officer in January 2022.

On August 24, 2021, Vetster announced its online pet pharmacy service, VetsterRX, to the US market. As of October 2021, Vetster had 35 employees.

Together with OnePoll, Vetster published a survey on pet guilt.

The Vetster platform allows users to schedule online consultations with veterinarians and veterinary technicians. Users can schedule consultations at any time of the day and any day of the week. The platform lets users choose which professionals to consult with, rather than assigning them to a veterinarian or technician. Users can receive a prescription through VetsterRx or their local human pharmacy where legally available.

Vetster offers video, text, and voice chat appointments. The Vetster platform can be accessed through the Vetster website or the Vetster mobile app.

== Partnerships, expansion, and recognition ==
In April 2022, the company signed a partnership with PetMed Express. As part of the agreement, PetMeds will be the exclusive eCommerce provider of Vetster medications, and Vetster will be the exclusive provider of telehealth services to PetMed's customers.

In August 2022, the company expanded into the UK following a £25m raise.

On January 31, 2024, the company launched its employer benefit Vetster for Business.

Vetster was named Pet Healthcare Company of the year in 2021, and recognized with the Pet App of the Year award in 2024 and 2025, by the Pet Innovation Awards.
