= List of Texas Tech Red Raiders in the NFL draft =

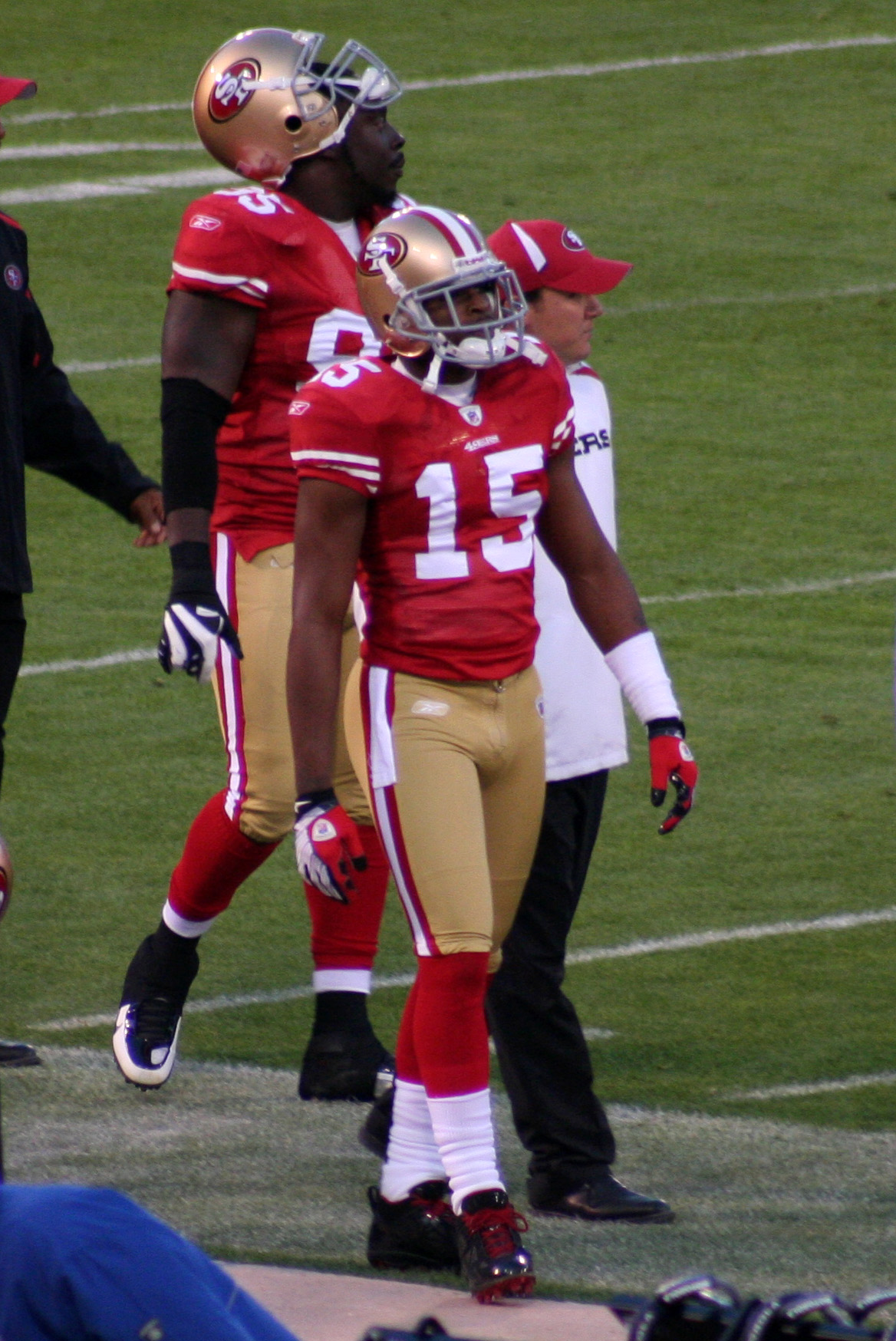
Michael Crabtree was drafted 10th overall by the San Francisco 49ers in the 2009 NFL draft.

The Texas Tech Red Raiders football team, representing Texas Tech University, has had 179 players drafted into the National Football League (NFL) since the league began holding drafts in 1936. (Note: Because of the NFL–AFL merger agreement, the history of the AFL is officially recognized by the NFL and therefore this list includes the AFL draft (1960–1966) and the common draft (1967–1969).) This includes ten players taken in the first round and one overall number one pick, Dave Parks in the 1964 NFL draft. The Green Bay Packers and Philadelphia Eagles have drafted the most Red Raiders, at eleven each. Every current franchise has drafted a player from Texas Tech. Three former Red Raiders have been selected to a Pro Bowl, seven former Red Raiders have won a league championship with their respective teams, and three former Red Raiders have been selected to both a Pro Bowl and won a league championship. Only one former Red Raider, Patrick Mahomes, has gone on to win the league Most Valuable Player award.

Each NFL franchise seeks to add new players through the annual NFL draft. The draft rules were last updated in 2009. The team with the worst record the previous year picks first, the next-worst team second, and so on. Teams that did not make the playoffs are ordered by their regular-season record with any remaining ties broken by strength of schedule. Playoff participants are sequenced after non-playoff teams, based on their round of elimination (wild card, division, conference, and Super Bowl).

Before the merger agreements in 1966, the American Football League (AFL) operated in direct competition with the NFL and held a separate draft. This led to a massive bidding war over top prospects between the two leagues. As part of the merger agreement on June 8, 1966, the two leagues would hold a multiple round "common draft". When the AFL officially merged with the NFL in 1970, the common draft simply became the NFL draft.

This list does not include undrafted Texas Tech players that have played for the NFL, for example, Wes Welker.

== Key ==
| B | Back (Note: In American and Canadian football, a back is a player who is lined up behind the linemen, the players who line up closest to the line of scrimmage.) | K | Kicker | NT | Nose tackle |
| C | Center | LB | Linebacker | FB | Fullback |
| DB | Defensive back | P | Punter | HB | Halfback |
| DE | Defensive end | QB | Quarterback | WR | Wide receiver |
| DT | Defensive tackle | RB | Running back | G | Guard |
| E | End | T | Offensive tackle | TE | Tight end |

| ^{†} | Selected to an all-star game |
| ^{‡} | Won a league championship |
| ^{♦} | Selected to an all-star game and won a league championship |

== Selections ==
=== American Football League ===
| Year | Round | Pick | Overall | Player | Team (Note: This is the team that drafted the player, not their most recent team.) | Position | Notes |
|---|---|---|---|---|---|---|---|
| 1961 | 1 | 6 | 6 | E. J. Holub^{♦} (Note: E. J. Holub was drafted in the 1961 NFL Draft by the Dallas Cowboys (16th overall) and in the 1961 AFL draft by the Dallas Texans (6th overall).) | Dallas Texans | LB | AFL All-Star (1961, 1962, 1964, 1965, 1966); AFL champion (1962, 1966); Super Bowl champion (IV) |
| 1963 | 12 | 2 | 170 | Roger Gill (Note: Roger Gill was drafted in the 1963 NFL Draft by the Philadelphia Eagles (158th overall) and in the 1963 AFL Draft by the San Diego Chargers (170th overall).) | San Diego Chargers | RB | — |
| 1964 | 4 | 8 | 32 | Dave Parks^{†} (Note: Dave Parks was drafted in the 1964 NFL Draft by the San Francisco 49ers (1st overall) and in the 1964 AFL Draft by the San Diego Chargers (32nd overall).) | San Diego Chargers | E | Pro Bowl (1964, 1965, 1966) |

=== National Football League ===
| Year | Round | Pick | Overall | Player | Team | Position | Notes |
|---|---|---|---|---|---|---|---|
| 1938 | 6 | 2 | 42 | Herschel Ramsey | Philadelphia Eagles | E | — |
| 1939 | 3 | 3 | 18 | Elmer Tarbox | Cleveland Rams | B | — |
| 1940 | 7 | 10 | 60 | Rex Williams | New York Giants | C | — |
| 1940 | 11 | 1 | 91 | Bill Davis | Chicago Cardinals | C | — |
| 1941 | 18 | 9 | 169 | Lonnie McCurry | Brooklyn Dodgers | G | — |
| 1942 | 19 | 3 | 173 | Charley Dvoracek | Philadelphia Eagles | B | — |
| 1943 | 9 | 6 | 76 | Doyle Caraway | New York Giants | G | — |
| 1944 | 7 | 1 | 55 | Rodger Smith | Chicago Cardinals | B | — |
| 1944 | 23 | 2 | 232 | Bucky Gillenwater | Brooklyn Dodgers | T | — |
| 1945 | 1 | 11 | 11 | Walt Schlinkman | Green Bay Packers | FB | — |
| 1945 | 27 | 10 | 284 | Jack Dillon | New York Giants | E | — |
| 1946 | 12 | 7 | 107 | Pat Farris | Detroit Lions | T | — |
| 1946 | 18 | 9 | 169 | Ed Robnett | Washington Redskins | FB | — |
| 1946 | 28 | 1 | 261 | Newman Ledbetter | Chicago Cardinals | T | — |
| 1947 | 18 | 2 | 157 | Tuffy Nabors | Boston Yanks | C | — |
| 1947 | 26 | 8 | 243 | Gene Standefer | Los Angeles Rams | B | — |
| 1947 | 28 | 5 | 260 | Joe Smith | Chicago Cardinals | E | — |
| 1947 | 30 | 6 | 281 | Bernie Winkler | Philadelphia Eagles | T | — |
| 1948 | 24 | 3 | 218 | Floyd Lawhorn | Washington Redskins | G | — |
| 1948 | 32 | 3 | 296 | Ralph Earhart | Green Bay Packers | E | — |
| 1949 | 5 | 2 | 43 | Glenn Lewis | Green Bay Packers | B | — |
| 1949 | 6 | 6 | 57 | Charles Reynolds | Los Angeles Rams | B | — |
| 1949 | 14 | 3 | 154 | Bobby Williams | Green Bay Packers | C | — |
| 1949 | 23 | 2 | 223 | Bill Kelley | Green Bay Packers | E | — |
| 1950 | 27 | 4 | 343 | Elbert Johnson | Detroit Lions | E | — |
| 1951 | 20 | 8 | 239 | Jerrell Price (Note: Jerrell Price was drafted in 1951 by the New York Yanks (239th overall) and in 1952 by the Los Angeles Rams (73rd overall).) | New York Yanks | T | — |
| 1951 | 27 | 8 | 323 | Ed Price | New York Yanks | B | — |
| 1951 | 29 | 9 | 349 | Earl Jackson | Los Angeles Rams | B | — |
| 1952 | 6 | 12 | 73 | Jerrell Price | Los Angeles Rams | T | — |
| 1952 | 13 | 11 | 157 | Aubrey Phillips | Los Angeles Rams | C | — |
| 1953 | 18 | 3 | 208 | Jim Turner | Washington Redskins | B | — |
| 1954 | 3 | 1 | 26 | Bobby Cavazos | Chicago Cardinals | B | — |
| 1954 | 8 | 2 | 87 | Jimmie Williams | Green Bay Packers | T | — |
| 1954 | 17 | 10 | 203 | Carl Kautz | San Francisco 49ers | T | — |
| 1955 | 9 | 2 | 99 | Walter Bryan | Baltimore Colts | B | — |
| 1955 | 10 | 6 | 115 | Claude Harland | Los Angeles Rams | E | — |
| 1955 | 21 | 12 | 253 | Rick Spinks | Cleveland Browns | FB | — |
| 1955 | 22 | 6 | 259 | Ken Elmore | Los Angeles Rams | T | — |
| 1956 | 3 | 1 | 26 | Bill Herchman | San Francisco 49ers | T | — |
| 1956 | 6 | 6 | 67 | Don Schmidt | Baltimore Colts | B | — |
| 1956 | 12 | 5 | 138 | Jerry Walker | Chicago Cardinals | T | — |
| 1956 | 13 | 5 | 150 | James Sides | Philadelphia Eagles | FB | — |
| 1956 | 19 | 7 | 224 | Ken Vakey | Green Bay Packers | E | — |
| 1956 | 21 | 4 | 245 | Ronnie Herr | Chicago Cardinals | B | — |
| 1957 | 8 | 11 | 96 | Bob Kilcullen^{‡} | Chicago Bears | T | NFL champion (1963) |
| 1957 | 13 | 11 | 156 | Don Williams | Chicago Bears | QB | — |
| 1958 | 7 | 4 | 77 | Gene Bentley | Chicago Bears | B | — |
| 1958 | 24 | 9 | 286 | Max Brod | New York Giants | B | — |
| 1958 | 27 | 6 | 319 | Floyd Dellinger | Pittsburgh Steelers | QB | — |
| 1958 | 27 | 10 | 323 | Bob Witucki | San Francisco 49ers | QB | — |
| 1961 | 2 | 3 | 16 | E. J. Holub^{♦} | Dallas Cowboys | LB | AFL All-Star (1961, 1962, 1964, 1965, 1966); AFL champion (1962, 1966); Super Bowl champion (IV) |
| 1962 | 3 | 12 | 40 | Pat Holmes^{†} | Philadelphia Eagles | T | AFL All-Star (1967, 1968) |
| 1962 | 12 | 9 | 163 | Bake Turner^{♦} | Baltimore Colts | RB | AFL All-Star (1963); AFL champion (1968); Super Bowl champion (III) |
| 1963 | 12 | 4 | 158 | Roger Gill | Philadelphia Eagles | RB | — |
| 1963 | 16 | 14 | 224 | Coolidge Hunt | Green Bay Packers | FB | — |
| 1964 | 1 | 1 | 1 | Dave Parks^{†} | San Francisco 49ers | E | Pro Bowl (1964, 1965, 1966) |
| 1965 | 1 | 7 | 7 | Donny Anderson^{♦} | Green Bay Packers | B | Pro Bowl (1968); NFL champion (1966, 1967); Super Bowl champion (I, II) |
| 1965 | 9 | 5 | 117 | Jim Zanios | Dallas Cowboys | RB | — |
| 1965 | 15 | 3 | 199 | John Carrell | Pittsburgh Steelers | T | — |
| 1965 | 18 | 8 | 246 | Leo Lowery | Los Angeles Rams | RB | — |
| 1965 | 18 | 10 | 248 | Jeff White | Green Bay Packers | E | — |
| 1966 | 14 | 5 | 205 | Jerry Lovelace | Washington Redskins | RB | — |
| 1967 | 12 | 1 | 289 | Ronnie Pack | New Orleans Saints | B | — |
| 1968 | 4 | 10 | 93 | Ed Mooney | Detroit Lions | LB | — |
| 1968 | 15 | 25 | 406 | Mike Leinert | Oakland Raiders | RB | — |
| 1969 | 4 | 9 | 87 | Jacky Stewart | Baltimore Colts | RB | — |
| 1969 | 6 | 12 | 142 | Ken Vinyard | Green Bay Packers | K | — |
| 1969 | 13 | 1 | 312 | Leon Lovelace | Buffalo Bills | T | — |
| 1969 | 13 | 16 | 329 | Jim Moylan | Minnesota Vikings | T | — |
| 1969 | 15 | 16 | 380 | Gary Golden | Minnesota Vikings | DB | — |
| 1970 | 3 | 23 | 75 | Denton Fox | Dallas Cowboys | DB | — |
| 1970 | 9 | 26 | 234 | Charley Evans | Kansas City Chiefs | T | — |
| 1970 | 12 | 21 | 307 | Jerry Sanders | Cleveland Browns | K | — |
| 1972 | 10 | 2 | 236 | John Odom | New York Giants | DB | — |
| 1973 | 9 | 12 | 220 | Russell Ingram | Atlanta Falcons | C | — |
| 1973 | 15 | 6 | 370 | Don Rives | Chicago Bears | LB | — |
| 1974 | 2 | 12 | 38 | Andre Tillman | Miami Dolphins | TE | — |
| 1974 | 13 | 4 | 316 | Joe Barnes | Chicago Bears | QB | — |
| 1975 | 7 | 16 | 172 | Lawrence Williams | New England Patriots | WR | — |
| 1975 | 16 | 14 | 404 | Calvin Jones | Philadelphia Eagles | WR | — |
| 1976 | 6 | 2 | 158 | Curtis Jordan^{‡} | Tampa Bay Buccaneers | DB | Super Bowl champion (XVII) |
| 1976 | 17 | 9 | 468 | Tony Green | Atlanta Falcons | DB | — |
| 1977 | 3 | 11 | 67 | Thomas Howard Sr. | Kansas City Chiefs | LB | — |
| 1977 | 6 | 21 | 196 | Tommy Duniven | Cincinnati Bengals | QB | — |
| 1978 | 4 | 6 | 90 | Billy Taylor | New York Giants | RB | — |
| 1978 | 5 | 5 | 115 | Eric Felton | New Orleans Saints | DB | — |
| 1978 | 5 | 22 | 132 | Jim Krahl | New York Giants | DT | — |
| 1978 | 8 | 9 | 203 | Mike Mock | New York Jets | P | — |
| 1978 | 12 | 8 | 314 | Dan Irons | San Francisco 49ers | T | — |
| 1979 | 11 | 16 | 291 | Brian Nelson | Minnesota Vikings | WR | — |
| 1980 | 3 | 10 | 66 | James Hadnot | Kansas City Chiefs | RB | — |
| 1980 | 4 | 19 | 102 | Larry Flowers | Tampa Bay Buccaneers | DB | — |
| 1980 | 8 | 2 | 195 | Ken Walter | Baltimore Colts | T | — |
| 1980 | 8 | 16 | 209 | Jeff Copeland | Cleveland Browns | LB | — |
| 1980 | 10 | 20 | 269 | Willie Stephens | Chicago Bears | DB | — |
| 1981 | 1 | 21 | 21 | Ted Watts^{‡} | Oakland Raiders | DB | Super Bowl champion (XVIII) |
| 1982 | 8 | 20 | 215 | Maury Buford^{‡} | San Diego Chargers | P | Super Bowl champion (XX) |
| 1982 | 8 | 25 | 220 | Tate Randle | Miami Dolphins | DB | — |
| 1982 | 10 | 10 | 261 | Ron Reeves | Houston Oilers | QB | — |
| 1983 | 1 | 21 | 21 | Gabriel Rivera | Pittsburgh Steelers | DT | — |
| 1983 | 9 | 14 | 238 | Hasson Arbubakrr | Tampa Bay Buccaneers | DT | — |
| 1983 | 10 | 5 | 256 | Anthony Hutchison | Chicago Bears | RB | — |
| 1984 | 7 | 14 | 182 | Stan David | Buffalo Bills | DB | — |
| 1985 | 5 | 9 | 121 | Dwayne Jiles | Philadelphia Eagles | LB | — |
| 1985 | 7 | 13 | 181 | Joe Walter | Cincinnati Bengals | T | — |
| 1985 | 11 | 12 | 292 | Brad White | New York Jets | DE | — |
| 1986 | 3 | 24 | 79 | Tim Crawford | New York Jets | LB | — |
| 1986 | 4 | 7 | 89 | Carl Carter | St. Louis Cardinals | DB | — |
| 1986 | 12 | 14 | 319 | King Simmons | Cleveland Browns | DB | — |
| 1987 | 2 | 5 | 33 | Roland Mitchell | Buffalo Bills | DB | — |
| 1987 | 5 | 5 | 117 | Timmy Smith^{‡} | Washington Redskins | RB | Super Bowl champion (XXII) |
| 1987 | 9 | 16 | 239 | Leonard Jones | Minnesota Vikings | DB | — |
| 1988 | 5 | 13 | 133 | Eric Everett | Philadelphia Eagles | DB | — |
| 1988 | 6 | 23 | 161 | Lemuel Stinson | Chicago Bears | DB | — |
| 1988 | 10 | 17 | 266 | Artis Jackson | Miami Dolphins | DT | — |
| 1989 | 2 | 23 | 51 | Billy Joe Tolliver | San Diego Chargers | QB | — |
| 1990 | 5 | 11 | 121 | James Gray | New England Patriots | RB | — |
| 1991 | 4 | 5 | 88 | Sammy Walker | Pittsburgh Steelers | DB | — |
| 1992 | 8 | 4 | 200 | Anthony McDowell | Tampa Bay Buccaneers | RB | — |
| 1992 | 12 | 9 | 317 | Don Harris | Dallas Cowboys | DB | — |
| 1994 | 3 | 26 | 91 | Bam Morris | Pittsburgh Steelers | RB | — |
| 1994 | 6 | 9 | 170 | Lloyd Hill | Chicago Bears | WR | — |
| 1994 | 6 | 15 | 176 | Derrell Mitchell | New Orleans Saints | WR | — |
| 1996 | 5 | 1 | 133 | Marcus Coleman | New York Jets | DB | — |
| 1996 | 5 | 22 | 154 | Zach Thomas^{†} | Miami Dolphins | LB | Pro Bowl (1999, 2000, 2001, 2002, 2003, 2005, 2006) |
| 1997 | 2 | 11 | 41 | Byron Hanspard | Atlanta Falcons | RB | — |
| 1998 | 7 | 36 | 225 | Tony Darden | Minnesota Vikings | DB | — |
| 1999 | 2 | 27 | 58 | Montae Reagor^{‡} | Denver Broncos | DT | Super Bowl champion (XLI) |
| 1999 | 5 | 34 | 167 | Darwin Brown | Denver Broncos | DB | — |
| 2000 | 5 | 1 | 130 | Anthony Malbrough | Cleveland Browns | DB | — |
| 2000 | 5 | 27 | 156 | Sammy Morris | Buffalo Bills | FB | – |
| 2001 | 7 | 37 | 237 | Kris Kocurek | Seattle Seahawks | DT | — |
| 2002 | 4 | 29 | 127 | Kevin Curtis | San Francisco 49ers | DB | — |
| 2003 | 6 | 21 | 194 | Aaron Hunt | Denver Broncos | DT | — |
| 2003 | 6 | 28 | 201 | Kliff Kingsbury^{‡} | New England Patriots | QB | Super Bowl champion (XXXVIII) |
| 2004 | 4 | 3 | 99 | Carlos Francis | Oakland Raiders | WR | — |
| 2004 | 7 | 47 | 248 | B. J. Symons | Houston Texans | QB | — |
| 2005 | 4 | 28 | 129 | Dylan Gandy^{‡} | Indianapolis Colts | G | Super Bowl champion (XLI) |
| 2005 | 5 | 14 | 150 | Daniel Loper | Tennessee Titans | T | — |
| 2005 | 7 | 20 | 234 | Mike Smith | Baltimore Ravens | LB | — |
| 2006 | 7 | 16 | 224 | E. J. Whitley | Dallas Cowboys | C | — |
| 2007 | 4 | 18 | 117 | Manny Ramirez | Detroit Lions | G | — |
| 2007 | 6 | 14 | 188 | Joel Filani | Tennessee Titans | WR | — |
| 2007 | 7 | 32 | 242 | Keyunta Dawson | Indianapolis Colts | LB | — |
| 2009 | 1 | 10 | 10 | Michael Crabtree | San Francisco 49ers | WR | — |
| 2009 | 2 | 16 | 48 | Darcel McBath | Denver Broncos | DB | — |
| 2009 | 3 | 14 | 78 | Louis Vasquez | San Diego Chargers | G | — |
| 2009 | 4 | 20 | 120 | Brandon Williams | Dallas Cowboys | DE | — |
| 2010 | 6 | 27 | 196 | Jamar Wall | Dallas Cowboys | DB | — |
| 2011 | 7 | 29 | 232 | Baron Batch | Pittsburgh Steelers | RB | — |
| 2014 | 2 | 17 | 49 | Jace Amaro | New York Jets | TE | — |
| 2014 | 7 | 14 | 238 | Will Smith | Dallas Cowboys | LB | — |
| 2016 | 3 | 19 | 82 | Le'Raven Clark | Indianapolis Colts | T | — |
| 2016 | 5 | 4 | 143 | DeAndré Washington | Oakland Raiders | RB | — |
| 2016 | 6 | 11 | 186 | Jakeem Grant | Miami Dolphins | WR | — |
| 2017 | 1 | 10 | 10 | Patrick Mahomes | Kansas City Chiefs | QB | 2x NFL Most Valuable Player (2018, 2022); 2x Super Bowl champion (LIV, LVII); 2x Super Bowl Most Valuable Player (LIV, LVII) |
| 2018 | 4 | 3 | 103 | Keke Coutee | Houston Texans | WR | — |
| 2018 | 6 | 18 | 191 | Dylan Cantrell | Los Angeles Chargers | WR | — |
| 2019 | 7 | 39 | 253 | Dakota Allen | Los Angeles Rams | LB | — |
| 2020 | 1 | 27 | 27 | Jordyn Brooks | Seattle Seahawks | LB | — |
| 2020 | 5 | 24 | 170 | Broderick Washington Jr. | Baltimore Ravens | DT | — |
| 2021 | 4 | 18 | 123 | Zech McPhearson | Philadelphia Eagles | DB | — |
| 2021 | 7 | 8 | 236 | Jack Anderson | Buffalo Bills | G | — |
| 2022 | 4 | 20 | 125 | Erik Ezukanma | Miami Dolphins | WR | — |
| 2022 | 7 | 25 | 246 | Dawson Deaton | Cleveland Browns | C | — |
| 2023 | 1 | 7 | 7 | Tyree Wilson | Las Vegas Raiders | DE | — |
| 2024 | 4 | 4 | 104 | Dadrion Taylor-Demerson | Arizona Cardinals | DB | — |
| 2024 | 7 | 16 | 236 | Myles Cole | Jacksonville Jaguars | DB | — |
| 2025 | 3 | 34 | 98 | Caleb Rogers | Las Vegas Raiders | OT | — |
| 2025 | 6 | 17 | 193 | Tahj Brooks | Cincinnati Bengals | RB | — |
| 2026 | 1 | 2 | 2 | David Bailey | New York Jets | LB | — |
| 2026 | 2 | 11 | 43 | Jacob Rodriguez | Miami Dolphins | LB | — |
| 2026 | 2 | 17 | 49 | Lee Hunter | Carolina Panthers | DT | — |
| 2026 | 3 | 6 | 70 | Romello Height | San Francisco 49ers | OLB | — |
| 2026 | 3 | 11 | 75 | Caleb Douglas | Miami Dolphins | WR | — |
| 2026 | 5 | 3 | 143 | Reggie Virgil | Arizona Cardinals | WR | — |
| 2026 | 6 | 24 | 205 | Skyler Gill-Howard | Detroit Lions | DT | — |
| 2026 | 7 | 18 | 234 | Behren Morton | New England Patriots | QB | — |
| 2026 | 7 | 28 | 244 | Cole Wisniewski | Philadelphia Eagles | S | — |
