= Elmer Tarbox =

American politician

Member of the House of Representatives of Texas
- In office 1973–1977
- Preceded by: Tom Christian
- Succeeded by: Joe Robbins; Froy Salinas

Member of the House of Representatives of Texas
- In office 1967–1973
- Preceded by: Ace Pickens
- Succeeded by: Pete Laney

Personal details
- Born: March 7, 1916 Bishop, Oklahoma
- Died: November 2, 1987 (aged 71) Lubbock, Texas
- Party: Democratic
- Spouse: Maxine Barnett
- Education: Texas Technological College
- Occupation: Businessman
- Awards: Air Medal; Purple Heart; Silver Star

Military service
- Branch/service: United States Army Air Corps
- Battles/wars: World War II

Elmer Lois Tarbox (March 7, 1916 – November 2, 1987) was an American military aviator, businessman, and politician. Tarbox served as a member of the Texas House of Representatives from 1967 to 1977.

== Early years ==
Elmer Tarbox was born in Bishop, Oklahoma on March 7, 1916, to Jake Tarbox and May Tarbox (née Riley). Tarbox was raised in the Texas Panhandle city of Higgins, Texas.

=== Education ===
Tarbox attended Texas Technological College (now Texas Tech University) and lettered in Red Raiders basketball, Red Raiders football, and Red Raiders track teams. Along with Jerry Dowd from the Saint Mary's Gaels, Tarbox was named Co-Outstanding Player in the 1939 Cotton Bowl Classic. He graduated with a Bachelor of Business Administration degree from Texas Tech in 1939. The same year, Tarbox was selected 18th overall in the 1939 NFL draft by the Cleveland Rams but chose not play professional football.

=== World War II ===
At the beginning of World War II, Tarbox enlisted in the United States Army Air Corps. Under the command of Claire Lee Chennault, he piloted B-25 bombers in the China Burma India Theater as a member of the 1st American Volunteer Group, nicknamed the "Flying Tigers." Tarbox was awarded an Air Medal, a Silver Star, and a Purple Heart. Upon discharge, Tarbox returned to Lubbock, Texas.

== Political career ==
In 1966, Tarbox ran successfully for the 76th District in the Texas House of Representatives. Tarbox was reelected twice to the same district and twice more in the 75th District. While a member of the legislature, he served on the appropriations committee that established the Texas Tech University School of Law and what is now the Texas Tech University Health Sciences Center (TTUHSC).

== Personal life ==
From 1946 to 1947, Tarbox served as president of the Texas Technological College Alumni and Ex-Students Association (now known as the Texas Tech Alumni Association). He married Maxine Barnett on March 29, 1944, and they had four children before she died in 1978. Tarbox founded the Tarbox Parkinson's Disease Institute in 1972 at the TTUHSC, to help develop a treatment and cure for Parkinson's disease, from which he suffered. On November 2, 1987, Tarbox died of complications of Parkinsonism and was buried at Resthaven Cemetery in Lubbock.

== See also ==
- List of NCAA major college football yearly receiving leaders
