= Millard Hall =

American journalist (1926–2005)

- Jerry Hall
- Born: August 12, 1926; Stanton, Texas
- Died: March 6, 2005 (aged 78)
- Other name: Jerry Hall
- Occupations: Journalist, political consultant
- Known for: Press secretary to Texas Governor Preston Smith
- Spouse: Mary Frances Hall née Vestal
- Children: Martha Hall, Richard Hall, Julie Hall

Millard Young "Jerry" Hall (August 12, 1926 – March 6, 2005) was an American journalist and political consultant. He served as press secretary to Texas governor Preston Smith.

== Early life ==
Hall was born in Stanton, Texas to John Morgan Hall and Beulah Mae Hall née Houston. After high school, he enrolled in John Tarleton College (now Tarleton State University) but dropped out to enlist in the U.S. Army Air Force where he served until the end of World War II. He then enrolled in Texas Technological College (now Texas Tech University) in Lubbock, Texas, where he served as editor of The Toreador and also worked as a photographer for the Lubbock Avalanche-Journal. He married Mary Frances Vestal on August 31, 1950, and received his journalism degree in 1954.

== Career ==
After graduating from college, Hall worked for a year as a copy editor for the Fort Worth Star-Telegram before joining the Washington staff of Congressman George H. Mahon.

By 1958, Hall had returned to the Lubbock Avalanche-Journal; and, by 1965, he had moved to Austin to work for the capitol bureau of Fentress Newspapers. He covered Charles Whitman's sniper attack on the University of Texas campus in 1966. He also covered the 1968 Democratic National Convention and 1968 Republican National Convention.

After Preston Smith was elected governor of Texas, he appointed Hall to serve as his press secretary, a role he held from 1969 to 1971. Hall, along with State Representative Bill Parsley and Warren Skaaren, a staff member in Governor Smith's office at the time, were instrumental in persuading Smith to create the Texas Film Commission.

Following his departure from the job of press secretary, Hall became the director of public information for the Constitutional Revision Commission and Constitutional Convention and worked on more than 60 political campaigns. In 1989, Hall returned to the Capitol in Austin to be Chief of Staff to Senator John Montford.
