= Anne Leaton =

American novelist

Anne Leaton (July 13, 1932 - January 25, 2016) was an American novelist, short story writer, and poet whose works have been published in England and America and whose radio plays have been broadcast on the BBC.

== Life ==
Born in Cleburne, Texas, she studied English and creative writing at Indiana University and Texas Tech University and was a Fulbright scholar to Germany, after which she spent twenty years traveling and working in Europe, the Middle East, South Africa, and Canada.

She received numerous awards for her fiction and poetry, including twice being the recipient of an O. Henry Award for her short stories. Leaton's work has been compared to other writers whose focus has been primarily upon social mores and human foibles—specifically such novelists and short story writers as Jane Austen, Henry James, and John Cheever.

She lived in Fort Worth, Texas.

== Works ==
=== Novels ===
- Good Friends, Just. Chatto & Windus. 1983. ISBN 978-0-7011-2711-4.
- Pearl. Knopf. 1985. ISBN 978-0-394-53923-2.
- Blackbird, Bye, Bye. Virago. 1989. ISBN 978-1-85381-012-1.

=== Short stories ===
- Mayakovsky, My Love. Chatto & Windus. 1984. ISBN 978-0-7011-2814-2.
- Leaton, Anne (1983). "Idyll". In Mars-Jones, Adam (ed.). Mae West Is Dead: Recent Lesbian and Gay Fiction. London: Faber and Faber Limited. pp. 103–120. ISBN 0-571-13188-3.

=== Radio play ===
- Anne Leaton; Colin Fish (1976). Circus Baby: a play for radio. Prix Italia.

=== Anthologies ===
- Joanna Goldsworthy, ed. (1995). Mothers: by Daughters. Virago. ISBN 978-1-85381-793-9.
