= Bradford P. Wilcox =

- Education: New Mexico State University, Texas Tech University
- Known for: Ecohydrology research, watershed management
- Awards: Dean's Outstanding Achievement Award for Research (2015), Outstanding Achievement Award (2018), Vice Chancellor's Award in Excellence (2021)
- Scientific career
- Fields: Ecohydrology, Rangeland Hydrology, Watershed Management
- Workplaces: Texas A&M University

Bradford P. Wilcox is an American ecohydrologist and academic. He is a professor in the Department of Ecology and Conservation Biology at Texas A&M University. His research focuses on the intersection of ecology and hydrology, specifically how climate, land degradation, and invasive species affect the water cycle in arid and semi-arid landscapes. He holds the Sid Kyle Endowed Professorship in Arid and Semi-Arid Land Ecohydrology.

== Education ==
Wilcox earned his B.S. and M.S. degrees in Range Ecology from Texas Tech University. He completed his Ph.D. in Ecohydrology at New Mexico State University as part of a joint program between the Department of Animal and Range Science and the Department of Plant Ecology.

== Career and research ==
Wilcox is a professor in the Department of Ecology and Conservation Biology at Texas A&M University. He also serves as an Associate Editor for the journal Ecohydrology. His work has a strong emphasis on rangeland hydrology, with a focus on understanding the interactions between vegetation and the water cycle. He and his students conduct research on issues such as the impact of woody plants on stream flow and groundwater recharge, as well as how invasive shrubs affect riparian areas and coastal wetlands. A notable project, funded by a U.S. Department of Agriculture grant, focuses on studying the impact of "thicketization" (the encroachment of woody plants) on groundwater recharge in the Carrizo-Wilcox Aquifer. Wilcox is also a lead grant author and key team member on "The Prairie Project," a collaboration with researchers from Texas A&M University, Oklahoma State University, and the University of Nebraska that aims to make rangeland production systems more profitable and sustainable.

Wilcox's research has been cited over 12,000 times.

== Awards and honors ==
- Elected as a Fellow of the American Association for the Advancement of Science (2025)
- Named Regents Professor at Texas A&M University (2022)
- Vice Chancellor's Award in Excellence from Texas A&M AgriLife (2021)
- Sid Kyle Endowed Professor in Arid and Semi-Arid Land Ecohydrology (2017)
- Outstanding Achievement Award for Research/Academia from the Society for Range Management (2018), recognizing his contributions to understanding how humans alter the water cycle.
- Dean's Outstanding Achievement Award for Research from the Texas A&M University College of Agriculture and Life Sciences (2015).

== Selected presentations ==
- EDTalks 2025: Ecohydrology of Woody Plant Encroachment (July 1, 2025) - A video presentation for the Edwards Aquifer Authority discussing the impact of woody plant encroachment on the Edwards Plateau. The talk covers the historical changes in the region, research on how vegetation alters the water cycle, and methods to maximize spring flow.
- The Ecohydrology of Woody Plant Encroachment: How the Conversion of Grasslands to Woodlands is Altering the Water Cycle (October 7, 2020) - A video presentation for The Global Institute for Water Security discussing how woody plant encroachment impacts the water cycle.
