= Association of Latino Professionals in Finance and Accounting =

Association of Latino Professionals For America
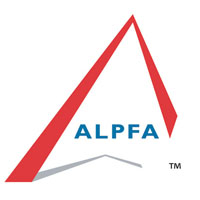
- Abbreviation: ALPFA
- Formation: March 1972
- Type: Non-profit organization
- Purpose: Connecting Latino Leaders for Impact
- Headquarters: Austin, Texas
- Members: 92,000+
- National/CEO: Damian Rivera
- Website: Official website

ALPFA (Association of Latino Professionals for America) is a national nonprofit organization created in 1972. This organization provides professional development workshops and career resources to its members. They provide members scholarships, career fairs, networking events and mentorship opportunities. ALPFA currently has over 92,000 professional and student members across the country. Currently, there are 160 active student chapters and 45 professional chapters.

== History ==
ALPFA was the first national Latino professional association in the United States, founded in 1972 in Los Angeles, California. Gilberto Vasquez founded ALPFA, a certified public accountant recognized as a community leader and an entrepreneur. The organization was created to address the lack of opportunities and visibility for Latinos and Hispanics in their industry. When founded, the organization's original name was AHCPA (Association of Hispanic Certified Public Accountants) . In 2001, the name was changed to ALPFA (Association of Latino Professionals in Finance and Accounting) to be more inclusive of the professionals that were joining the organization. In November 2009, ALPFA merged with the National Hispanic Business Association (NHBA) to further grow the organization. In 2010, their name was officially changed to the Association of Latino Professionals For America to welcome professionals from all industries. In 2011, ALPFA launched ALPFA Solutions to provide advisory services. In 2016, ALPFA unveiled a new purpose: Connecting Latino Leaders for Impact. In 2017, ALPFA partnered with Fortune Magazine and Columbia University and hosted the first ever 50 Most Powerful Latina in Corporate America Event. In 2018, ALPFA Inc. appointed Damian Rivera as their CEO.

== Events ==
ALPFA hosts various yearly events throughout the year such as Regional Student Symposiums, ALPFA Convention, and the Annual HBS Latino Banquet. Members gather at these events to participate in different workshops and for the opportunity to network with other ALPFA members and professionals.

=== Regional Student Symposiums ===
ALPFA hosts a total of four symposiums throughout the year, (Central, West, Southeast, Northeast). These symposiums offer students across the nation opportunities to network with recruiters and learn about different internships and full-time positions available. While attending any of the four symposiums the students can also attend workshops on communication skills, interviewing skills and overall professional development. Lastly, the symposium ends with a career fair with over 20 corporate sponsors.

=== ALPFA Convention ===
ALPFA Convention is a national event hosted for students and professionals to attend. This event brings thousands of members together for a week full of learning, networking and professional growth. Throughout the week in opening and closing sessions ALPFA has respected keynote speakers, gives out scholarships to students and awards the title of National Chapter of the Year and Regional Chapter of the Year to the winning university chapters. In addition, there are also social events for members to participate in such as White Night and the Masquerade Ball. The event closes with a career fair with over 50 companies in attendance and opportunities for on-sight interviews.

In 2018, ALPFA's Convention took place in Las Vegas, Nevada. They had over 2,601 attendees, 75 workshops, 50 recruiting companies, and 43 scholarships were awarded. The National Chapter of the Year was awarded to the ALPFA Florida International University Chapter. The Regional Chapter of the Year awards were awarded to the following university chapters in the corresponding regions. Midwest Region: University of Illinois at Chicago, Northwest Region: University of Idaho, Northeast Region: Queens College - Cuny, Southeast Region: Florida International University, Central Region: University of Texas at Austin, West Region: San Francisco State University.

=== Annual HBS Latino Banquet ===
For the last 15 years ALPFA has been hosting the HBS Latino Banquet for business professionals in a multitude of different industries and experiences. Those in attendance were from undergraduate students, grad students, mid-career professionals and senior executives.

== Programs ==
=== Students Programs ===
45 universities in the United States have an ALPFA student chapter that hosts educational and training events for members, and provides job opportunities through corporate partners. Regional Student Symposiums are also hosted multiple times a year, where students attend career fairs and have the opportunity to interview with employers.

ALPFA also partners with corporations to offer scholarships for college students. Approximately $100,000 in scholarships are awarded annually.

=== Professional Programs ===
There are over 160 professional ALPFA chapters across major cities in the United States. The professional chapters provide members with training opportunities and networking events throughout the year. ALPFA also hosts a national convention annually to provide workshops and job recruiting opportunities.

== The Most Powerful Latinas List ==
In 2017, Fortune Magazine published a list of the 50 Most Powerful Latinas. The list was compiled by ALPFA and features Latina executives running Fortune 500 companies, large private firms, and entrepreneurs leading global companies. ALPFA has continued to compile the list annually.
