= List of Texas Tech Red Raiders in the NBA draft =

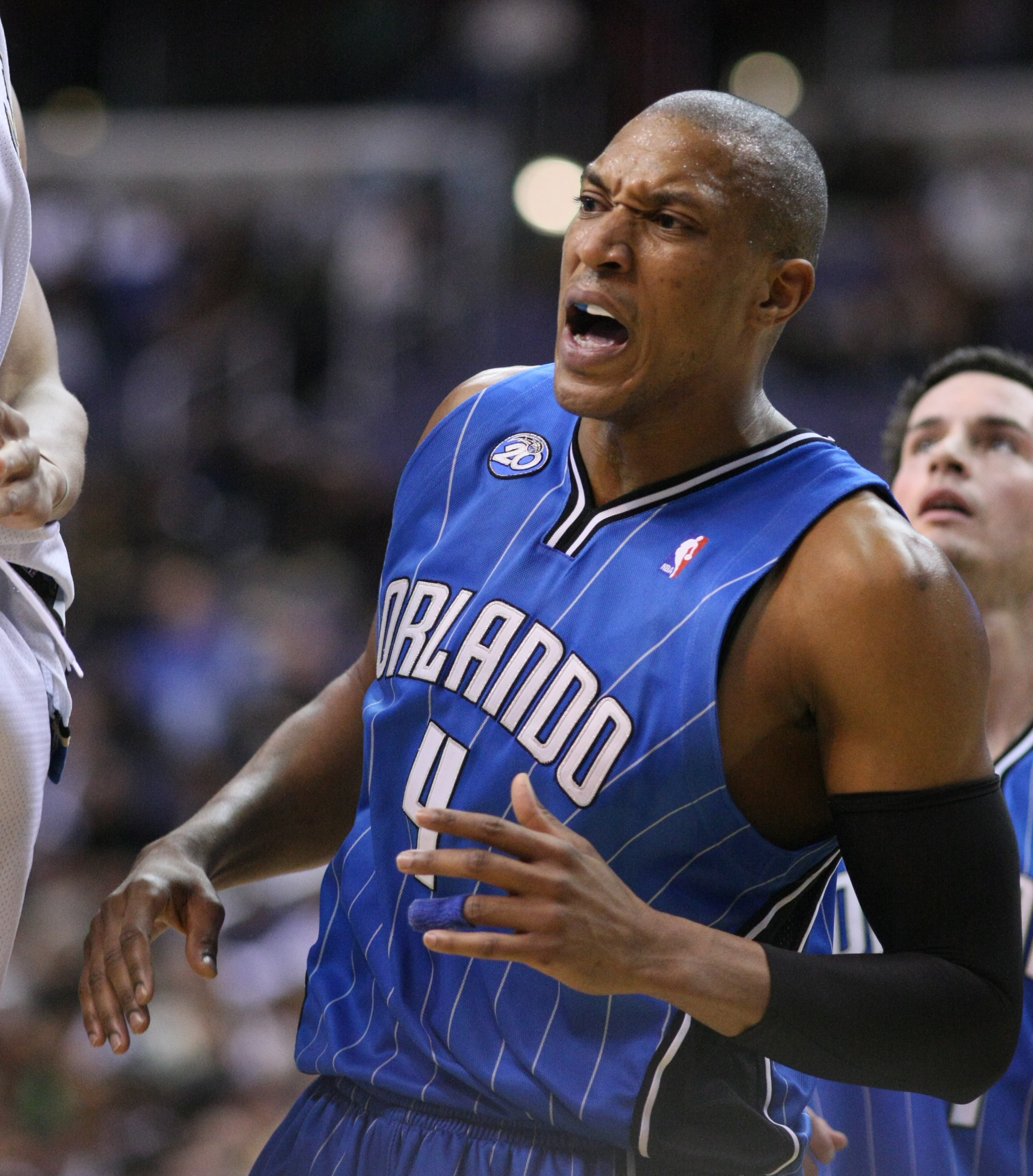
Tony Battie, drafted in 1997.

The Texas Tech Red Raiders basketball team, representing Texas Tech University, has had 23 players drafted into the National Basketball Association (NBA) since the league began holding drafts in 1947. Tony Battie, taken fifth overall in the 1997 draft, was Texas Tech's only player drafted in the first round until Zhaire Smith was selected 16th overall in the 2018 draft. The Seattle SuperSonics (now the Oklahoma City Thunder) have drafted 3 Red Raiders, more than any other NBA franchise.

Each NBA franchise seeks to add new players through an annual draft. The NBA uses a draft lottery to determine the first three picks of the NBA draft; the 14 teams that did not make the playoffs the previous year are eligible to participate. After the first three picks are decided, the rest of the teams pick in reverse order of their win–loss record. To be eligible for the NBA draft, a player in the United States must be at least 19 years old during the calendar year of the draft and must be at least one year removed from the graduation of his high school class. From 1967 until the ABA–NBA merger in 1976, the American Basketball Association (ABA) held its own draft.

== Drafts ==
=== American Basketball Association ===
Year	Round	Pick	Overall	Player	Position	ABA team (Note: This is the team that drafted the player, not their most recent team.)	Notes
1971	—	—	—	Gene Knolle (Note: Gene Knolle was drafted in the 1971 NBA draft by the Portland Trail Blazers and in the 1971 AFA draft by the Dallas Chaparrals.)		Dallas Chaparrals	—

=== National Basketball Association ===
Year	Round	Pick	Overall	Player	Position	NBA team	Notes
1947	—	—	—	Garland Head		New York Knicks	—
1953	—	—	—	Paul Nolen		Baltimore Bullets	—
1956	—	—	—	Gene Carpenter		Rochester Royals	—
1956	—	—	—	Jim Reed		St. Louis Hawks	—
1959	8	4	57	Leon Hill		Minneapolis Lakers	—
1962	3	4	20	Harold Hudgens		Detroit Pistons	—
1971	7	3	105	Gene Knolle		Portland Trail Blazers	—
1972	15	5	192	Greg Lowery		Chicago Bulls	—
1975	6	11	101	William Johnson		Houston Rockets	—
1976	4	6	57	Rick Bullock		New York Knicks	—
1978	3	8	52	Mike Russell		Kansas City Kings	—
1979	3	6	50	Geoff Huston		New York Knicks	—
1980	10	13	212	Kent Williams		Seattle SuperSonics	—
1982	2	19	42	Jeff Taylor		Houston Rockets	—
1982	5	18	110	Clarence Swannegan		Seattle SuperSonics	—
1985	4	16	86	Bubba Jennings		Dallas Mavericks	—
1985	6	21	137	Quentin Anderson		Milwaukee Bucks	—
1986	4	23	93	Tony Benford		Boston Celtics	—
1995	2	19	48	Mark Davis		Minnesota Timberwolves	—
1996	2	12	41	Jason Sasser		Sacramento Kings	—
1997	1	5	5	Tony Battie		Denver Nuggets	—
1998	2	20	49	Cory Carr		Atlanta Hawks	—
2004	2	6	35	Andre Emmett		Seattle SuperSonics	—
2018	1	16	16	Zhaire Smith		Phoenix Suns	—
2019	1	6	6	Jarrett Culver		Phoenix Suns	—
2020	2	12	42	Jahmi'us Ramsey		Sacramento Kings	—
