= Texas Tech Alumni Association =

- Formation: 1927
- Type: Alumni Association
- Headquarters: Lubbock, Texas
- President & CEO: Curt Langford
- Website: www.texastechalumni.org

The Texas Tech Alumni Association is the alumni association for former students of Texas Tech University. The organization was founded in 1927 and sponsors multiple programs for Texas Tech University and its alumni.

== History ==
The Alumni Association of Texas Technological College, more commonly known as the Texas Tech Alumni Association, was founded on May 30, 1927, after the first commencement exercises were held by Texas Technological College. All 26 graduates joined the organization, marking the first and last time that all graduates of the school belonged to the organization. In April 1935, the organization changed its name to "Alumni and Ex-Students Association" to include both graduates, and non-graduates. By 1939, chapters of the organization were located in Amarillo, Austin, Dallas, El Paso, Fort Worth, Houston, San Antonio, Slaton and Waco, and in 1940 reached a benchmark of 800 members.

In September 1949, a second name change occurred, this time to simply "Ex-Students Association." By the 1960s, Texas Technological College had expanded its offerings to more than just technical subjects and the Faculty Advisory Committee proposed changing the institution's name to "Texas State University." While most students and faculty supported the change, the Board of Directors was pressured by the Ex-Students Association and alumni, wanting to preserve the Double T, opposed the change. The Board of Directors appeased the Ex-Students Association members by choosing "Texas Tech University" instead, preserving the Double T, and submitted the name change to the state legislature in 1964 and finally received the legislature's approval in 1969. The same year, the Texas Tech Ex-Students Association office relocated from the Administration Building where it had been housed since 1937 to the former President's House. The two-story building provided enough room for the organization to host receptions and meetings in addition to space for a larger staff. In 1980, the association had 6,278 members. The growth in membership resulted in 11 new chapters bringing the total to 70 in 1982.

In February 2002, the organization changed its name to the current incarnation, Texas Tech Alumni Association, the colloquial name for the organization under its original name.

== Facilities ==
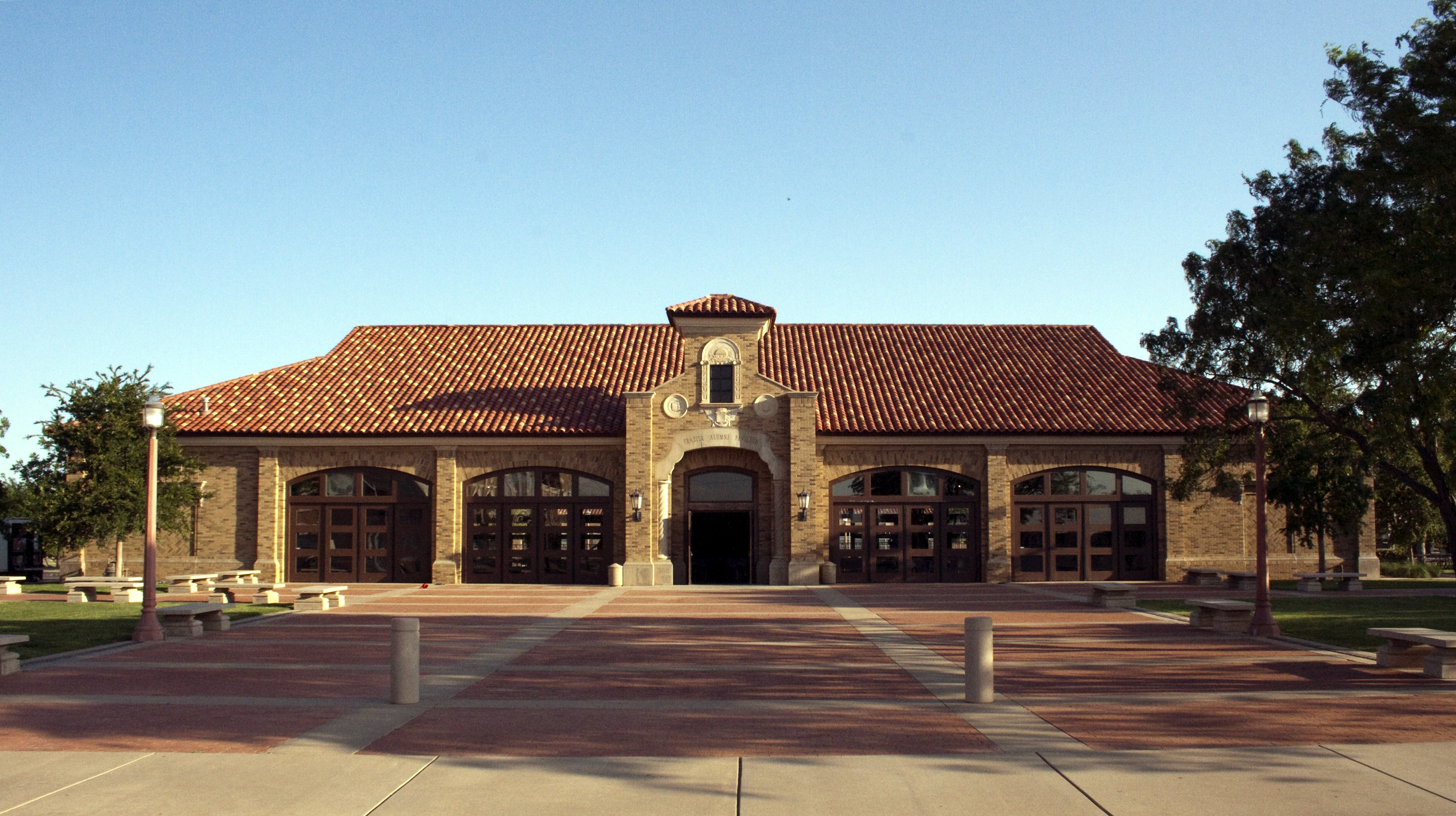
The Frazier Alumni Pavilion and Plaza

The Texas Tech Alumni Association has been headquartered in McKenzie-Merket Alumni Center since 1969. The building was The President's Residence from 1925 until 1959. It was one of the original structures built on campus in 1924. The facility underwent a $4 million expansion in 2010 that added the Bill and Peggy Dean Grand Reception Hall, the McKenzie Ballroom, the Shinn-Wylie Bridal Suite, expanded catering capabilities and an outdoor courtyard with gazebo. McKenzie-Merket Alumni Center is regularly booked for university and community meetings and special events, and is in such demand on weekends that brides wanting to book the facility for weddings and receptions are told to "plan on a long engagement."

In 1998, the Texas Tech Alumni Association built the Frazier Alumni Pavilion, a meeting space near Jones AT&T Stadium. The pavilion is a popular gathering spot on home football game days and also hosts meetings and special events.

== Traditions ==
=== Class ring ===
While the class ring had occasionally used a universal design, by the late 20th century various styles were available. In 1999, the university reverted to a single ring design for the university's graduates. The new Official Texas Tech Alumni Association Class Ring symbolically captures the essence of Texas Tech with the prominent Double T surrounded by the school's full name and date of foundation. By tradition, undergraduates wear the ring with the Double T facing themselves. Upon graduation, the ring is turned so the logo faces outward.

One shoulder of the ring displays an image of the Administration Building, with the bells which represent victory. The other shoulder contains the university seal: an American eagle perched above a book, representing the church; a star, representing the State of Texas; a key, representing home; and, a lamp, representing knowledge. These elements are separated by a cross featuring ten cotton bolls, one each for Lubbock and its nine surrounding cotton-producing counties.

In 2010, the ring was cast in a six-foot-tall bronze sculpture and set in place on a Leaders Plaza on the grounds of McKenzie-Merket Alumni Center. Billed as "Two Tons of Tradition," the ring sculpture has become one of the most popular photo spots on campus, especially on graduation days.

== Services ==
The organization published its first alumni publication, Texas Tech Magazine, in October 1937. The periodical contained articles about stories and events about Texas Tech, the alumni association, and general interest articles. Due to World War II, the publication was suspended in the spring of 1943. The alumni association's second periodical, Texas Techsan, was first published in February 1950. The periodical was released eight times annually, and like its predecessor Texas Tech Magazine, game Texas Tech alumni updates of campus events and the activities of some of its former students.

== See also ==
- List of Texas Tech University alumni
- List of Texas Tech University alumni (sports)
