= Lawrence Schovanec =

American mathematician

17th President of Texas Tech University
- Incumbent
- Assumed office August 1, 2016
- Preceded by: Duane Nellis

Personal details
- Born: November 14, 1952 (age 73)
- Education: Phillips University (BA); Texas A&M University (MA); Indiana University, Bloomington (PhD)
- Scientific career
- Fields: Mathematics
- Institutions: Texas Tech University
- Thesis: Crack problems in nonhomogeneous bodies and related existence results (1982)
- Doctoral advisor: Morton Lowengrub

Lawrence E. Schovanec (born November 14, 1952) is an American mathematician and academic administrator. He is the current President of Texas Tech University. His career at Texas Tech spans more than four decades, during which he has held faculty and senior administrative roles, including department chair, dean, provost, and president.

== Early life and education ==
Schovanec was raised in Oklahoma. He earned a Bachelor of Science degree from Phillips University, a Master of Science degree in mathematics from Texas A&M University, and a Doctor of Philosophy in mathematics from Indiana University. His doctoral dissertation was titled Crack problems in nonhomogeneous bodies and related existence results, and his advisor was Morton Lowengrub.

== Academic and administrative career ==
Schovanec joined the faculty of Texas Tech University in 1982 as an assistant professor of mathematics. He held multiple leadership roles at the university, including chair of the Department of Mathematics & Statistics, interim dean and dean of the College of Arts & Sciences, provost and senior vice president, and interim president in 2012 before his formal appointment as president in 2016.

== Presidency of Texas Tech University ==
Since becoming president, Schovanec has overseen a period of institutional growth at Texas Tech. Under his leadership, enrollment increased by nearly 6,000 students, surpassing 42,000 in 2025. The university received more than $1 billion in philanthropic gifts and directed over $900 million toward campus infrastructure and facilities. In 2019, the Texas Legislature approved the Texas Tech University School of Veterinary Medicine — the first new veterinary school in Texas in more than a century. Texas Tech has also maintained its Carnegie Classification as a “Very High Research Activity” (R1) institution.

== Research and scholarship ==
Schovanec’s scholarly work focuses on applied mathematics, particularly in biomechanical and physiological control systems and solid mechanics. He has published research in these areas and received external funding, primarily from the National Science Foundation, supporting both his research and STEM education outreach efforts.

== Boards and leadership roles ==
Schovanec serves on the executive board of the Inter‑American Organization for Higher Education and is a member of the NAFSA Board of Directors. He previously chaired the Texas Council of Public University Presidents and Chancellors and the Texas International Education Consortium. From 2021 to 2023, he served as chair of the Big 12 Conference Board of Directors. In 2025, he was appointed to the College Football Playoff Board of Managers as the representative of the Big 12 Conference.

== Personal life ==
Schovanec is married to Patty Schovanec, a mathematics faculty member at Texas Tech University. He has two sons. He was raised on a farm in Oklahoma.
