= Andre Waismann =

Israeli physician

- אנדרה וייסמן
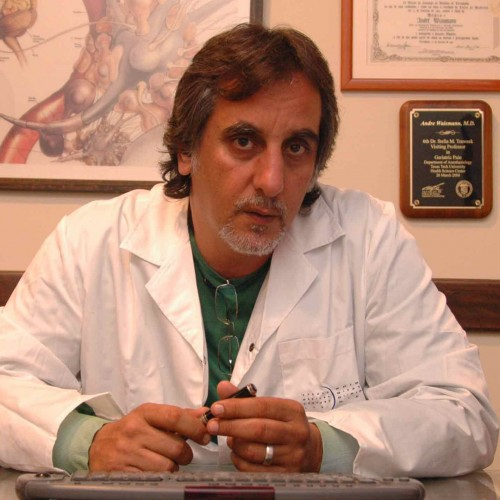
- Born: André Waisman; 7 September 1958 (age 67); Rio de Janeiro, Rio de Janeiro (state), Brazil
- Education: Medicine School, Rio de Janeiro State University, Teresópolis, Brazil
- Occupations: Doctor, medical practitioner in the field of drug addiction treatment
- Years active: 1982–present
- Medical career
- Institutions: Barzilai Medical Center; Assuta Medical Center, Tel Aviv, Israel; FMI Hospital, Switzerland; Herzliya Medical Center, Herzliya, Israel
- Awards: Honorary Professor from the Texas Tech University. 2000
- Website: Andre Waismann's official website

Andre Waismann (Hebrew: אנדרה וייסמן, Portuguese: André Waisman) is an Israeli doctor and medical practitioner, notable for development of accelerated neuro-regulation (ANR) treatment of opioid addiction. Waismann currently serves as the head of the ANR unit at the Barzilai Medical Center and director at the ANR Clinic in Florida, US.

Anesthesia-assisted detox like ANR has been described in peer-reviewed medical literature as owing to providing "inconsistent rates of opioid abstinence while being costlier and riskier compared to available alternatives." Comparison with standard detox methods suggests serious risks without an advantage in terms of efficacy.

== Biography ==
Waismann was born in Brazil in 1958. He studied medicine at Brazil's Serra dos Órgãos University Center in Teresópolis, where he received his doctor degree in 1981. He immigrated the same year to Israel and was drafted to a military service in the Givati Brigade, where he served as a doctor. After completing his service with the Israel Defense Forces, Waismann worked as a doctor in the intensive care unit in the Barzilai Medical Center in Ashkelon. In 1989, Waismann was drafted to the Israeli Police, as a Superintendent, serving as the Jerusalem county doctor.

In 1994, Waismann established intensive care unit for treating addiction to opioids. In 2002 he helped to establish a treatment center in Jalandhar, India using the ANR method. In 2012, Waismann established an ANR unit for treatment of addiction in the Barzilai Medical Center. In 2013, Waismann opened a clinic to treat addicts in the FMI hospital in Switzerland. Waismann also served as a consultant for the ASA Bangasa foundation in Indonesia.

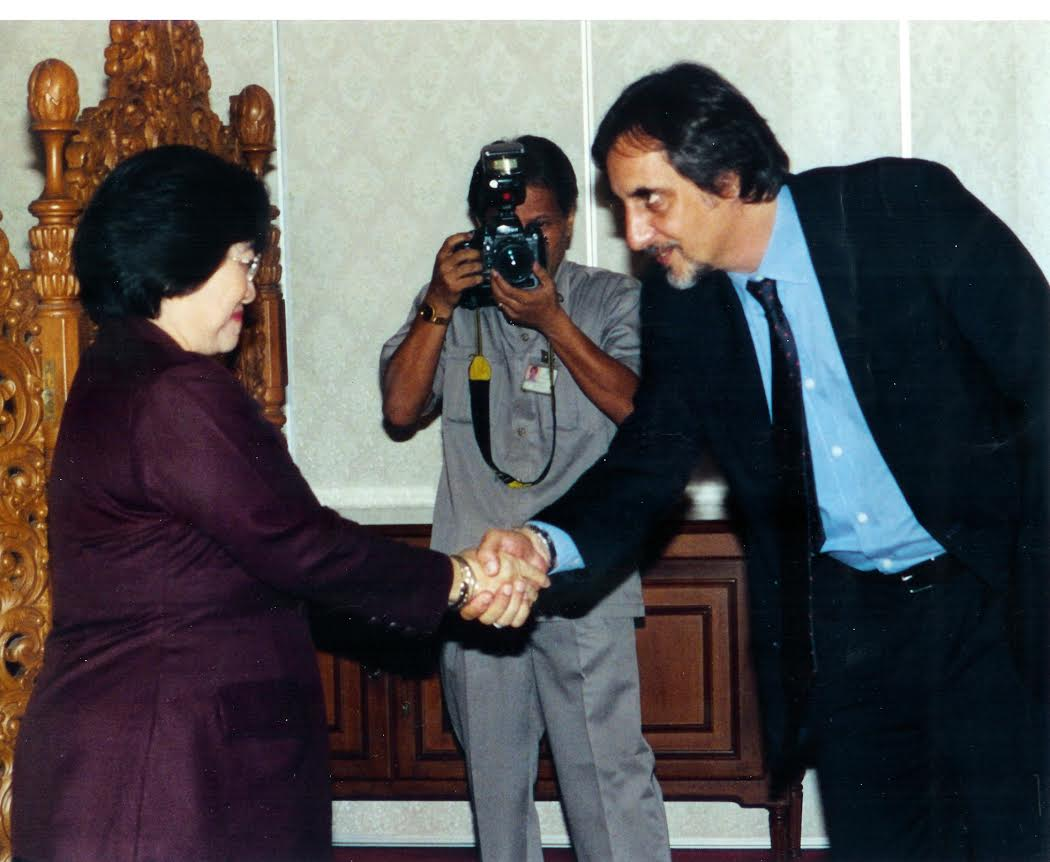
Waismann with President of Indonesia, Megawati Sukarnoputri

Waismann also served as the medical director for addiction treatment in the LOGO center and San Raffaele Hospital in Italy. In October 2018 Waismann was invited to speak at the United Nations human rights convention about methods to cope with the international opioid crisis

== ANR method for treating opioid addiction ==
From 1993, Waismann started to treat opioid addiction using a relatively new technique named Ultra Rapid Opiate Detoxification (UROD). This method was used until 1997, when Waismann redefined this treatment method and renamed it ANR – Accelerated Neuro-Regulation. The principle on which the ANR therapy is based is the acceleration of the withdrawal symptoms while the patient is under sedation to prevent pain and suffering as a result from these withdrawal symptoms. When the patient is under deep sedation in an intensive care unit, specific drugs are used to block the additional opioid receptors caused by frequent opioid use that generate the craving for the drug in the brain. The ANR treatment method is currently conducted in a number of medical centers in India, Switzerland, Israel, and from 2019 in Florida.

== Selective works and publications ==
- M. Y. Mudaliar, A Waismann, J Currie, L Cruz, Opioid neuroreceptor blockade with naltrexone under sedative anaesthesia in a 6-year-old child with iatrogenic morphine addiction following resection of a desmoplastic infantile ganglioglimoa at age 9 months, Anaesthesia and Intensive Care subscriber, Volume 27, Issue 1
- Andre Waismann, Alternative approaches to battling opioid dependency, Florida Weekly, 15 August 2019
- Andre Waismann, To end the opioid crisis, we need to change the way we think about the addiction, Washington Examiner, 23 July 2019

== Personal life ==
Waismann lives in moshav Ge'a. He is married to Efrat Waismann. They have six children. Since the end of 2018, Waismann lives in the United States, where he works as a private consultant for American medical centers.

== See also ==
- Substance use disorder
