= Ruben Garcia Jr. (FBI agent) =

FBI agent

Ruben Garcia Jr. (born August 15, 1951) is a former executive assistant director of the Federal Bureau of Investigation (FBI).

Garcia was born to Mexican-American parents, Cecilia and Ruben Garcia, in Brownfield, the seat of Terry County in West Texas near Lubbock. After graduating from Brownfield High School, Garcia earned a Bachelor of Arts degree from Texas Tech University in Lubbock, where he excelled in baseball as an All-American pitcher for the Red Raiders.

After a short-lived career with the Kansas City Royals baseball organization, Garcia joined the FBI as a Special Agent in October 1978. Excelling through the ranks of the FBI, Garcia was named Assistant Special Agent in Charge of the San Antonio Division in June 1994 and assumed responsibility for oversight of investigations involving white-collar crimes, national security, domestic terrorism, civil rights, and applicants. In September 1996, Garcia assumed administrative oversight for the San Antonio Division to include the Austin and Waco Resident Agencies. In 2001, Garcia was appointed by Director Robert Mueller as an executive assistant director for the FBI, achieving the second highest position in the Bureau and becoming the highest ranked Hispanic law enforcement officer in the United States at the time of his appointment. Garcia resigned from the position after approximately two months.
