= PetMed Express =

American online pet pharmacy

PetMed Express, Inc.
- Type: Public
- Traded as: Nasdaq: PETS
- Industry: Online pharmacy
- Founded: 1996; 30 years ago
- Founder: Marc Puleo
- Headquarters: Delray Beach, Florida, U.S.
- Key people: Leslie Campbell (Interim CEO)
- Products: Animal drugs
- Revenue: ▲US$281.1 million (2024) ▼US$256.6 million (2023) ▼US$273.4 million (2022) ▲US$309.2 million (2021) ▲US$284.1 million (2020); US$283.4 million (2019)

PetMed Express, Inc., also known as PetMeds, is an online pet pharmacy based in the United States. It is publicly traded and sells prescription and non-prescription pet medication.

== Business model ==
PetMed Express is an online pharmacy that sells prescription and non-prescription pet medication and nutritional supplements. It can only fill prescriptions written by veterinarians, and competes with veterinarians who derive some of their income from selling pet medication.

== History ==
Petmed Express was founded in Florida in 1996 by Marc Puleo. Puleo was an anesthesiologist who wanted to open a mail-order business for human prescriptions that also sold pet accessories. He shifted his focus to pet medicines due to Merck already heavily controlling the human prescription market. The company initially grew through word of mouth, television commercials, and its catalogs.

Its stock was traded on the OTC Bulletin Board under the symbol PETS from September 1997 until March 2000; in March 2000 the company began the process of becoming listed on the National Quotation Bureau Electronic Quotation Service and became responsible for reporting to the SEC.

Until 2002 PetMed Express and a company called Savemax Inc. operated in the same premises, shared staff, and operated under the same pharmacy licenses. According to the lawyer for both companies, Savemax was formed because of "a concern over PetMed's liability, and whether it [would] continue." From 1999 to 2002, PetMed Express and SaveMax were charged with violating the pharmaceutical law in several states. In one instance it was fined by the Environmental Protection Agency for selling drugs in metric doses, and has also received a warning letter from the FDA for selling misbranded drugs. In 1999, PetMed Express settled charges with the Florida Pharmacy Board for selling drugs that did not have prescriptions, false advertising, poor record keeping, and not labelling drugs correctly.

In addition to pet medications, PetMed Express also sold pet accessories such as leashes. In 2000, Tricon Holdings invested $2 million into the company. The company also hired Menderes Akdag as CEO in 2001. It discontinued 5,000 products and began focusing strictly on medicine-related items.

In 2002, PetMed Express and Savemax were fined by the EPA for selling prescription drugs illegally. The drugs were made by Novartis for sale in Europe and Australia and the doses and labelling were not FDA-approved. Also in 2002, PetMed Express, this time with Savemax, the company reached a settlement with the Florida Pharmacy Board for contracting with veterinarians to write prescriptions for animals they had never examined. The Florida board provided information to national boards and encouraged other state boards to take actions against veterinarians who had worked with PetMed Express to provide prescriptions for animals they had not examined. In the same year, the company settled similar charges in Ohio. In November 2002, the pharmacy board in Texas filed a lawsuit charging PetMed Express with dispensing veterinary drugs without prescriptions. The case was settled in 2006 with a $50,000 fine and three years' probation.

In 2004 a securities class action lawsuit was filed against the company, claiming that the company was not candid about the difficulty in getting prescriptions authorized by veterinarians. In 2005, the lawsuits were voluntarily dismissed by the plaintiffs. Puleo stepped down from executive leadership with the company the same year. Another shareholder lawsuit was filed against the company in 2018, claiming that it marketed dangerous animal drugs to humans. The lawsuit was later dismissed by plaintiffs after investigation of the claims.

As announced by PetMed Express Inc. in a regulatory filing published on Friday, June 4, 2021, Menderes Akdag, chief executive officer, leaves the online pet pharmacy after around 20 years in the role. PetMed said: “On May 28, 2021, the Board of Directors of PetMed Express, Inc. (the “Company”) notified Menderes Akdag, President and Chief Executive Officer, that the Company will not extend Mr. Akdag’s employment agreement with the Company and that the employment agreement would therefore end on July 30, 2021 in accordance with the scheduled end date of the agreement. The Company has presented a proposal to Mr. Akdag regarding the continuation of his role as President and Chief Executive Officer for a transition period following July 30, 2021 until a new CEO is appointed.” Matthew N. Hulett, the former president of language learning giant Rosetta Stone, was named CEO and president effective August 30, 2021. Hulett entered into a three-year employment agreement with PetMed Express at a $500,000 base salary per year. He also received 90,000 shares of restricted stock and 510,000 shares of performance restricted stock.

In April 2022, the company signed a partnership with Vetster, a telehealth veterinary company. As part of the agreement, PetMeds will be the exclusive eCommerce provider of Vetster medications, and Vetster will be the exclusive provider of telehealth services to PetMeds customers.

In 2023, PetMed partnered with Pumpkin Pet Insurance a pet insurance provider. In 2025, PetMed launched PetHealthMD a pet care insurance provider.

== Recognition ==
The company was picked 4th among Forbes magazine's 200 Best Small Business Companies in 2006 and number 6 in 2007. BusinessWeek named PetMed Express number 27 of its top 100 "Hot Growth Companies" in 2006.
