= Education in Texas =

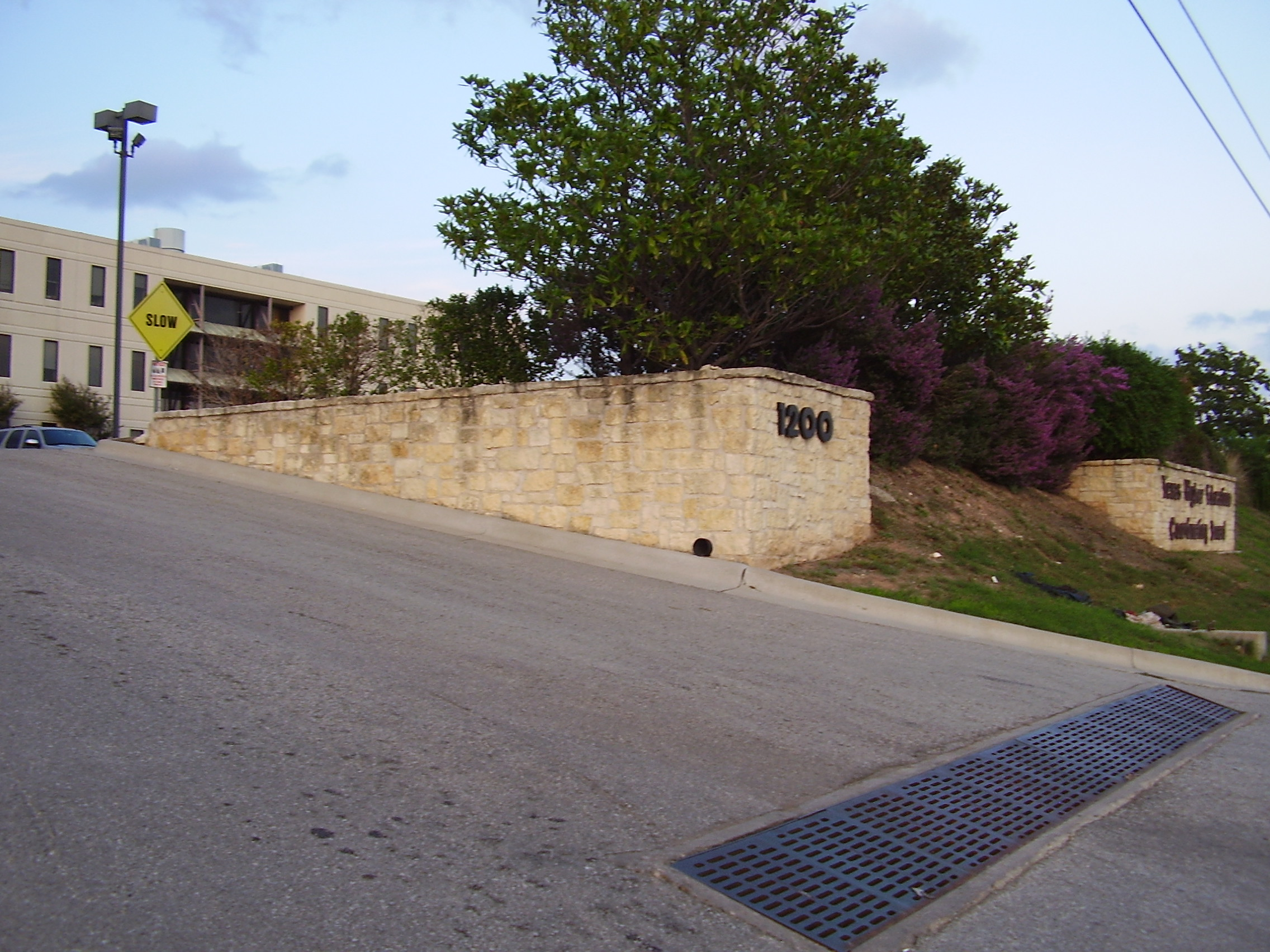
Texas Higher Education Coordinating Board headquarters

Education in Texas consists of a large and structurally distinct public school system, a network of public and private universities, and a range of alternative pathways including charter, private, and home schooling.

Texas has over 1,000 public school districts, nearly all of which are independent from municipal and county government—governed by locally elected boards with the power to levy taxes and exercise eminent domain. The Texas Education Agency (TEA) provides oversight and supplemental funding, though its jurisdiction is largely limited to intervening in low-performing districts. State curriculum is governed by the Texas Essential Knowledge and Skills (TEKS), maintained by the State Board of Education. Public school students are assessed through the State of Texas Assessments of Academic Readiness (STAAR).

At the postsecondary level, Texas has 35 public universities, organized into six state systems, as well as a large number of private institutions. Sixteen Texas universities hold Carnegie Tier One research classification. The state's higher education landscape grew substantially in the mid-twentieth century, shaped by wartime investment, the 1949 Gilmer-Aikin reforms that restructured K-12 funding and governance, and federal research dollars flowing to Texas institutions during the Kennedy and Johnson administrations.

== History ==
Education in Texas began in the late 1830s. In breaking away from Mexico in 1836 the grievances in the Declaration of Independence complained of the failure of the Mexican government "to establish any public system of education, although possessed of almost boundless resources."

=== Gilmer-Aikin Laws of 1949 ===
After Beauford H. Jester, a Democrat, was re-elected to a second term as governor in 1948, he worked with A. M. Aikin Jr. to secure the most extensive education reforms in the state. The 1949 Gilmer-Aikin Act was the first comprehensive system for Texas school funding. It was a series of three bills that reformed the state's public school system. These laws significantly impacted Texas education by raising teacher salaries, consolidating school districts, and providing state funding for equalization. The reform also established the Texas Education Agency and guaranteed all Texas children the opportunity to attend public school for twelve years with a minimum of 175 actual teaching days per year. The laws consolidated 4,500 rural school districts into 2,900 more efficient administrative units. The pay scale for teachers was raised. Local taxes were supplemented with state money to equalize spending across the new school districts. Districts could obtain more money by decreasing non-attendance. The laws did not affect private schools or parochial schools operated by the Catholic Church. The laws did not change the legal requirement for segregation of Black schools. Hispanic students mostly attended all-Hispanic schools, although their segregation was not required by law.

=== Higher education ===
During World War II the main universities like University of Texas and Texas A&M University gained a new national role. The wartime financing of university research, curricular change, campus trainee programs, and postwar veteran enrollments changed the tenor and allowed Texas schools to gain national stature.

From 1950 through the 1960s, Texas modernized and dramatically expanded its system of higher education. Under the leadership of Governor Connally, the state produced a long-range plan for higher education, a more rational distribution of resources, and a central state apparatus that managed state institutions with greater efficiency. Because of these changes, Texas universities received federal funds for research and development during the John F. Kennedy and Lyndon B. Johnson administrations.

== Primary and secondary education ==
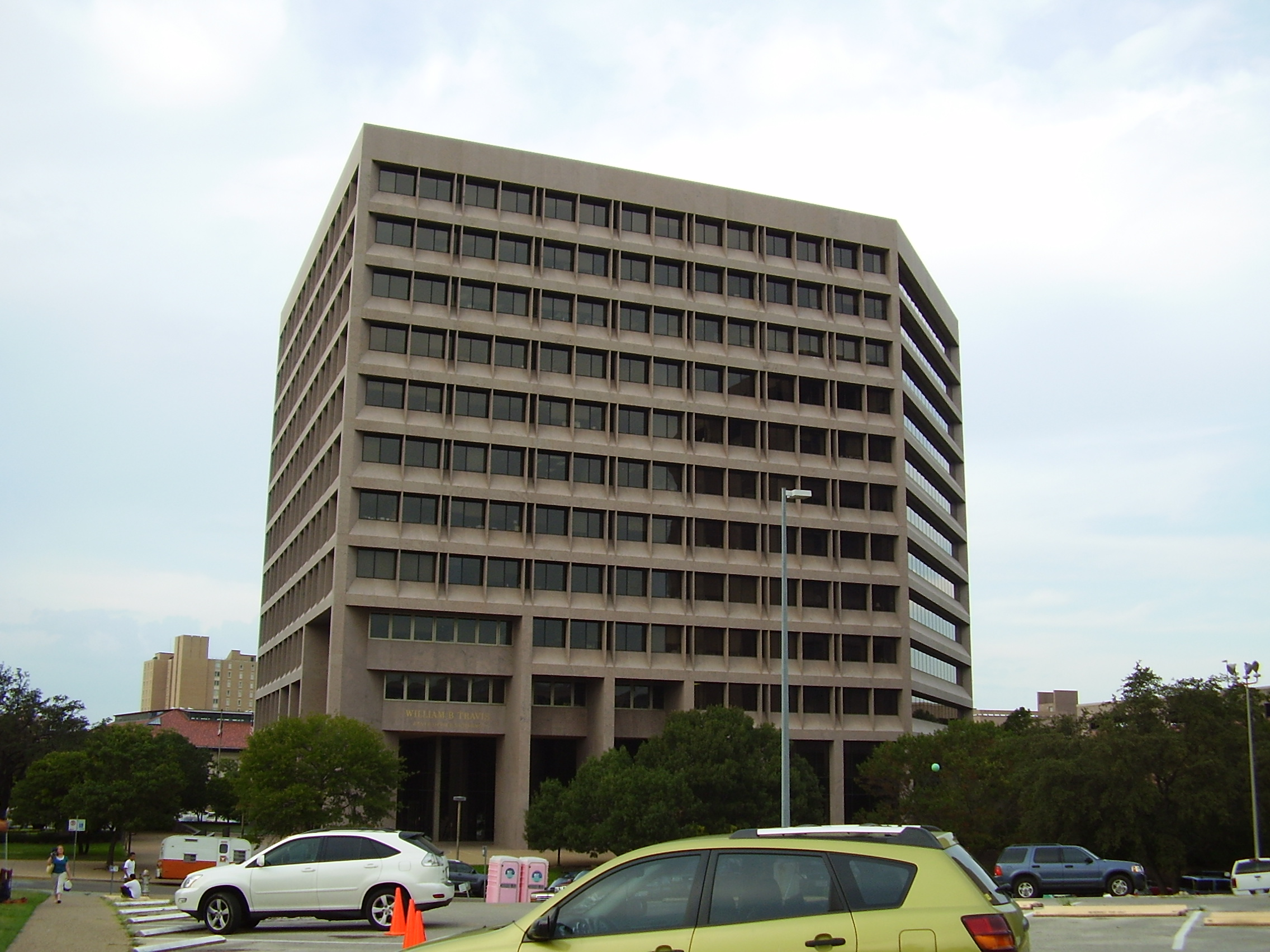
The main offices of the Texas Education Agency are located in the William B. Travis State Office Building in Austin

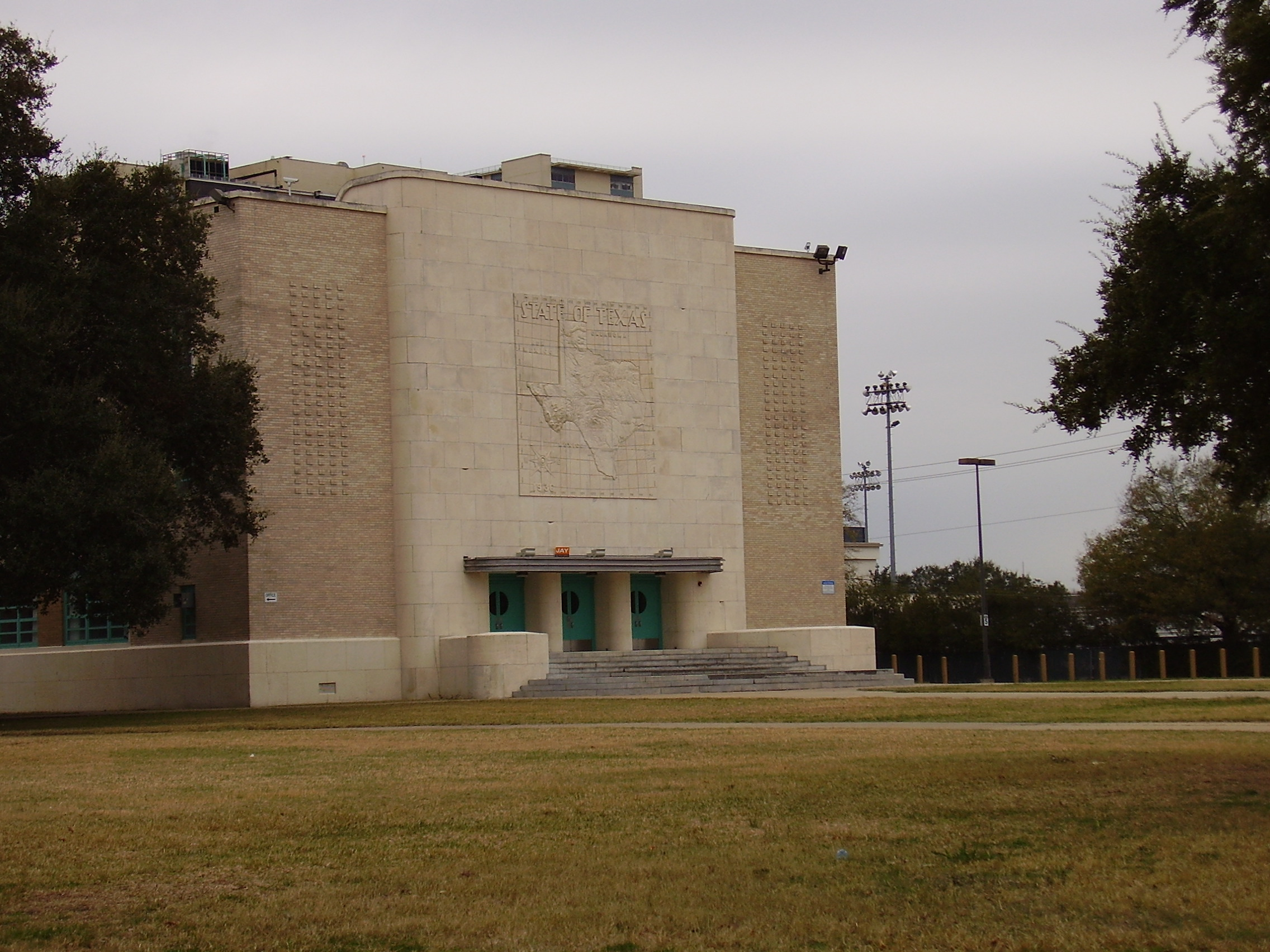
The entrance to the Lamar High School auditorium in Houston is decorated with a map of the state of Texas.

Texas has over 1,000 school districts—ranging in size from the gigantic Houston Independent School District to the Divide Independent School District in rural south Texas, which has had as few as eight students at one time in the district. All but one of the school districts in Texas are separate from any form of municipal government, hence they are called "independent school districts", or "ISD" for short. School districts may (and often do) cross city and county boundaries. School districts have the power to tax their residents and to use eminent domain. The sole exception to this rule is Stafford Municipal School District, which serves all of the city of Stafford.

The Texas Education Agency (TEA) has oversight of the public school systems as well as the charter schools. Because of the independent nature of the school districts the TEA's actual jurisdiction is limited. The TEA is divided into twenty Educational Service Center "regions" that serve the local school districts. The Robin Hood plan is a controversial tax redistribution system that provides court-mandated equitable school financing for all school districts in the state. Property tax revenue from property-wealthy school districts is distributed to those in property-poor districts, in an effort to equalize the financing of all districts throughout Texas.

Especially in the metropolitan areas, Texas also has numerous private schools of all types (non-sectarian, Catholic, and Protestant). The TEA has no authority over private school operations; private schools may or may not be accredited, and achievement tests are not required for private school graduating seniors. Many private schools will obtain accreditation and perform achievement tests as a means of encouraging future parents that the school is genuinely interested in educational performance.

It is generally considered to be among the least restrictive states in which to home school. Neither the TEA nor the local school district has authority to regulate home school activities; state law only requires that the curriculum 1) must teach "reading, spelling, grammar, mathematics and a study of good citizenship" (the latter interpreted to mean a course in civics) and 2) must be taught in a bona fide manner. There are no minimum number of days in a year, or hours in a day, that must be met, and achievement tests are not required for home school graduating seniors. The validity of home schooling was challenged in Texas, but a landmark case, Leeper v. Arlington ISD, ruled that home schooling was legal and that the state had little or no authority to regulate the practice.

As of 2010 49% of children enrolled in public Pre-K through 12 primary and secondary schools in Texas are classified as Hispanic. In the decade from the 1999–2000 school year to the 2009–2010 school year, Hispanics made up 91% of the growth in the state's public K-12 schools. The overall student body increased by 856,061 students, with 775,075 of those students being Hispanic.

Although unusual in the West, school corporal punishment is not uncommon in more conservative areas of the state, with 28,569 public school students paddled in Texas at least one time during the 2011–2012 school year, according to government data. The rate of school corporal punishment in Texas is surpassed only by Mississippi, Alabama, and Arkansas.

=== Textbooks and curriculum ===
The state curriculum in Texas is specified in the Texas Essential Knowledge and Skills (TEKS), which are updated and maintained Texas State Board of Education (SBOE). The state has never adopted the Common Core State Standards Initiative. The State Board of Education also selects the textbooks that are used in public schools; many other states also use textbooks developed in Texas.

==== Bias and accuracy ====
Social studies textbooks and curricula in Texas have often been criticized for having a conservative Christian bias and lack of factual accuracy with regards to history and religions, and for portraying Islam and conflicts in the Middle East in a negative manner. Notably, the curriculum for American history teaches that Moses was an important influence on the Founding Fathers. A 2014 report by the Texas Freedom Network also found, among other issues, that the then-proposed American history textbooks downplayed the role of conquest and slavery; gave an inadequate and unbalanced overview of LGBT people and Native Americans; and gave undue praise of laissez-faire capitalism. SBOE panels who select textbooks are rarely teachers or academics, and are chosen in elections with minimal turnout.

In 2021, the state legislature passed Texas House Bill 3979, which bans the teaching of critical race theory. The American Historical Association, among others, expressed concern that the bill's broad scope could lead to omission or whitewashing of controversial race or gender topics in social studies. The Carroll Independent School District school board came under fire for claiming that books about the Holocaust would have to be balanced with ones "that [have] other perspectives" under the new law, though education experts and the district's superintendent disagree that the law will affect the factual accuracy of educational material.

The science curriculum adopted in 2009 was the first to include a full overview of the theory of evolution, but faced backlash after the final version included a loophole that allowed schools to dismiss evolution in favor of creationism. The current 2017 science curriculum in Texas does not mandate the teaching of evolution over creationism, but removed language that was perceived to have discouraged the teaching of evolution. A curriculum approved in 2024 called Bluebonnet Learning includes religious subject matter, like literary analysis of the Sermon on the Mount from the Christian New Testament, which critics charge gives improper preference to religion generally and to one specific religion out of many practiced in the state, in violation of the Establishment Clause of the U.S. Constitution. The state of Texas will grant an additional $60 per student to districts that choose to use the Bluebonnet Learning curriculum.

=== Standardized tests ===
The State of Texas Assessments of Academic Readiness (STAAR) are a series of standardized tests used in Texas primary and secondary schools to assess students' attainment of reading, writing, math, science, and social studies skills required under Texas education standards. It is developed and scored by Pearson Educational Measurement with close supervision by the Texas Education Agency. Though created before the No Child Left Behind Act was passed, it complies with the law. It replaced the previous test, called the Texas Assessment of Knowledge and Skills, or TAKS test, in 2017. The TAKS test replaced the Texas Assessment of Academic Skills, or TAAS test, in 2003.

== Public colleges and universities ==
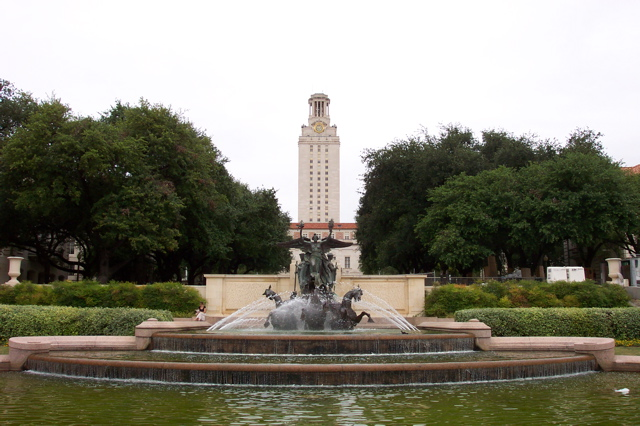
The University of Texas at Austin

Texas' controversial alternative affirmative action plan, Texas House Bill 588, guarantees Texas students who graduated in the top 10 percent of their high school class automatic admission to state-funded universities. The bill encourages demographic diversity while avoiding problems stemming from the Hopwood v. Texas (1996) case.

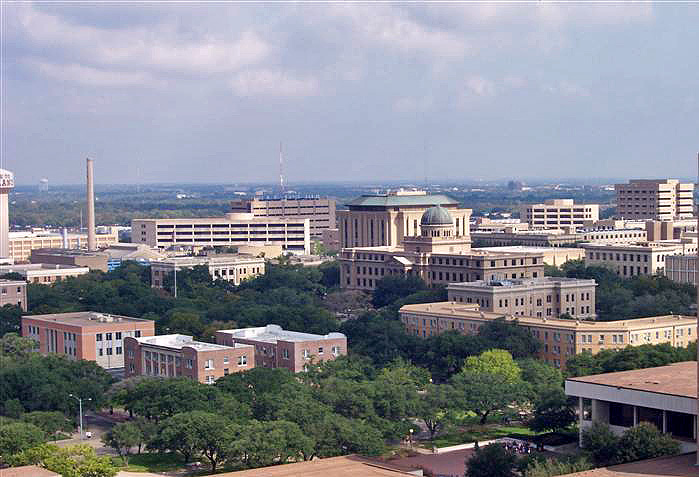
Texas A&M University

Thirty-five (35) separate and distinct public universities exist in Texas, of which 33 belong to one of the six state university systems. Discovery of minerals on Permanent University Fund land, particularly oil, has helped fund the rapid growth of the state's two largest university systems: The University of Texas System and the Texas A&M System. The five other university systems: the University of Houston System, the University of North Texas System, the Texas State System, the Texas Tech System, and the Texas Woman's University System are not funded by the Permanent University Fund.

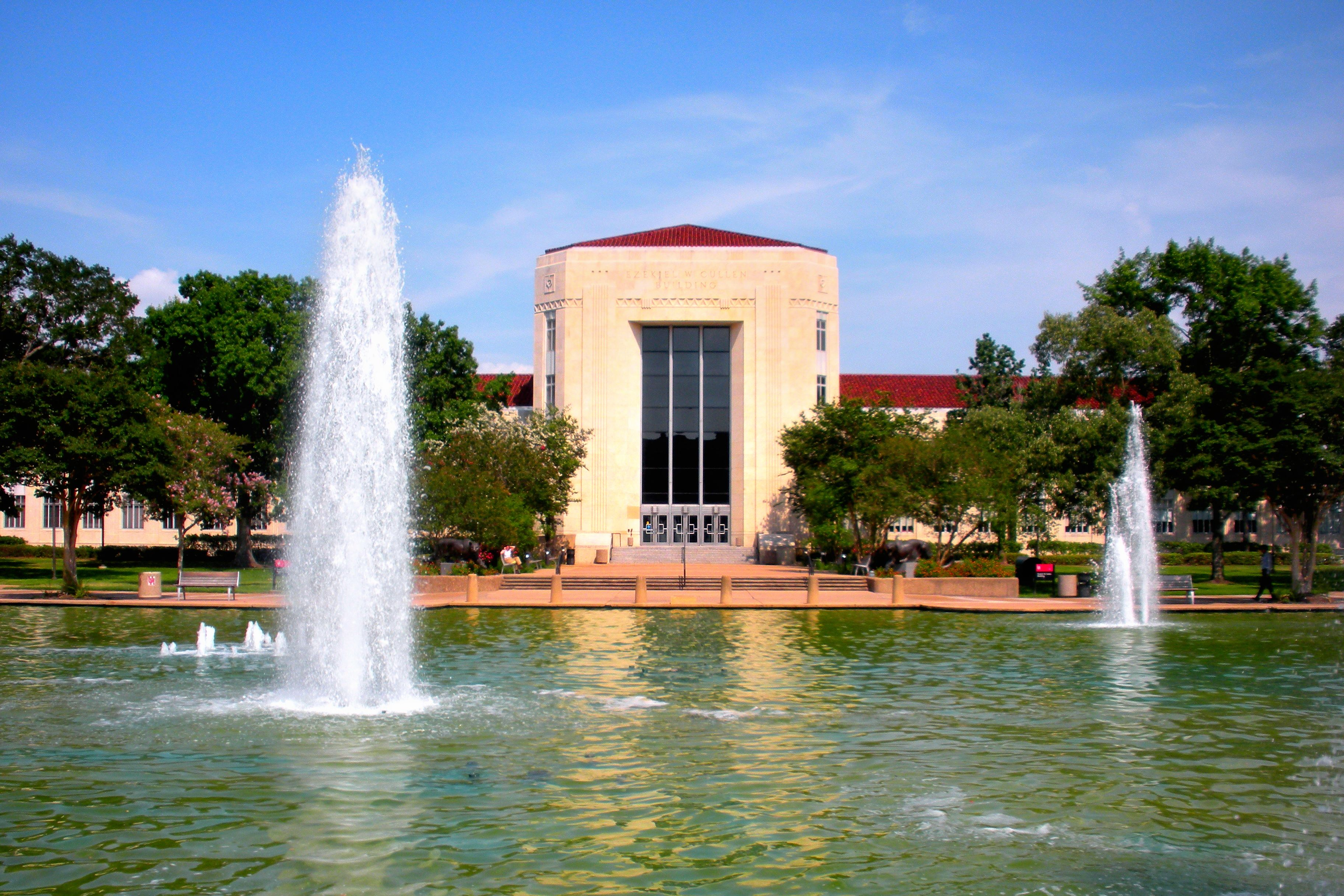
University of Houston

Both the University of Texas and Texas A&M University were established by the Texas Constitution and hold stakes in the Permanent University Fund. The state has been putting effort to expand the number of flagship universities by elevating some of its seven institutions designated as emerging research universities. The two that are expected to emerge first are the University of Houston and Texas Tech University, likely in that order according to discussions on the House floor of the 82nd Texas Legislature.

=== University of Houston System ===
The University of Houston System has four separate and distinct institutions; each institution is a stand-alone university and confers its own degrees. Its flagship institution is the University of Houston, a research university. The three other institutions in the System are stand-alone universities; they are not branch campuses of the University of Houston.

The flagship institution of the System, the University of Houston, ranks No. 189 in the National University Rankings of U.S. News & World Report, and No. 106 among top public universities.

The University of Houston System's annual impact on the Texas economy equates to that of a major corporation: $1.1 billion in new funds attracted annually to Texas, $3.13 billion in total economic benefit, and 24,000 local jobs generated. This is in addition to the 12,500 new graduates the UH System produces every year who enter the workforce throughout Texas.

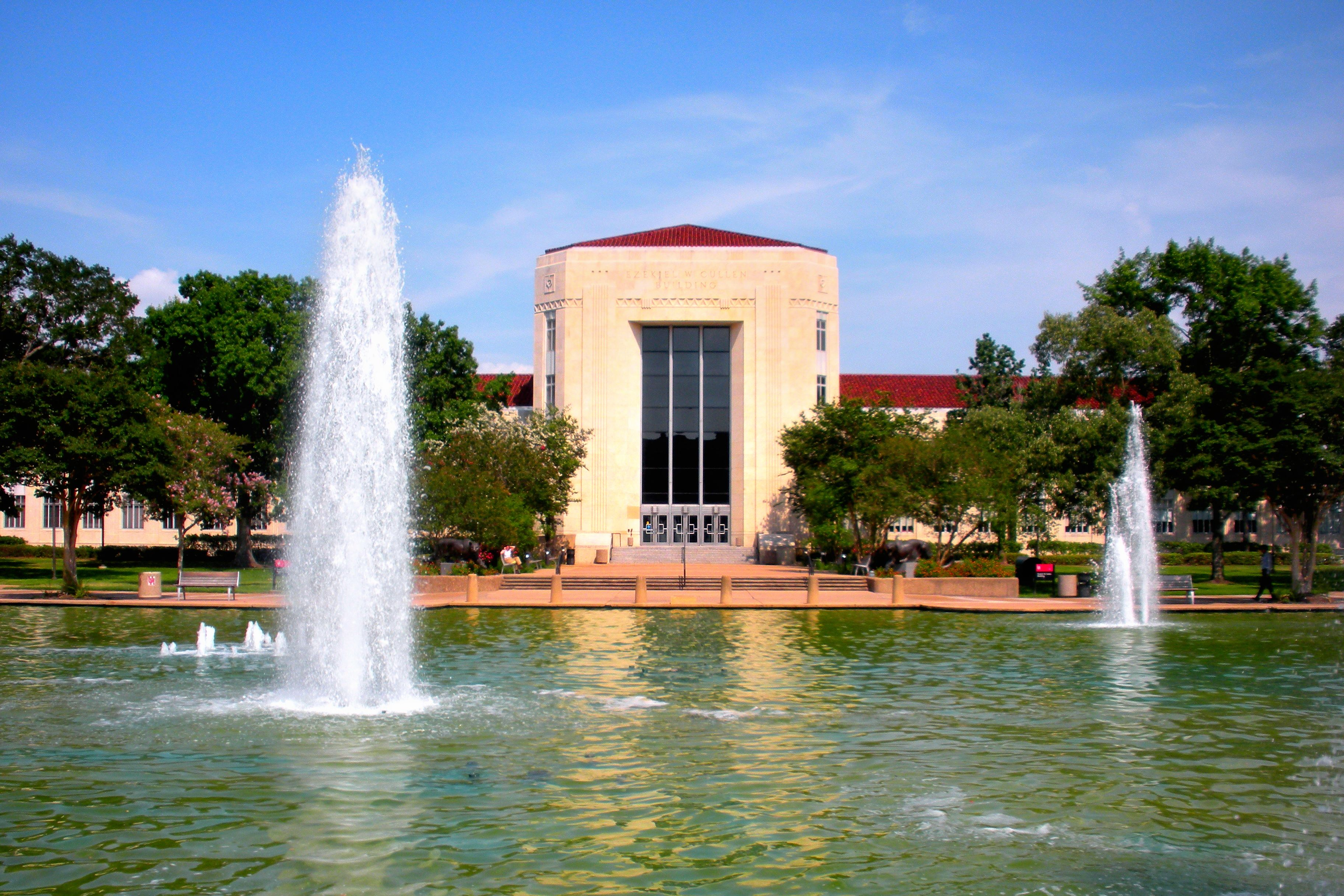
University of Houston

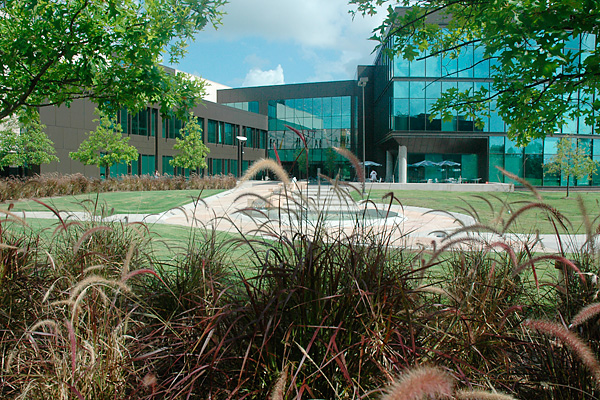
UH–Clear Lake

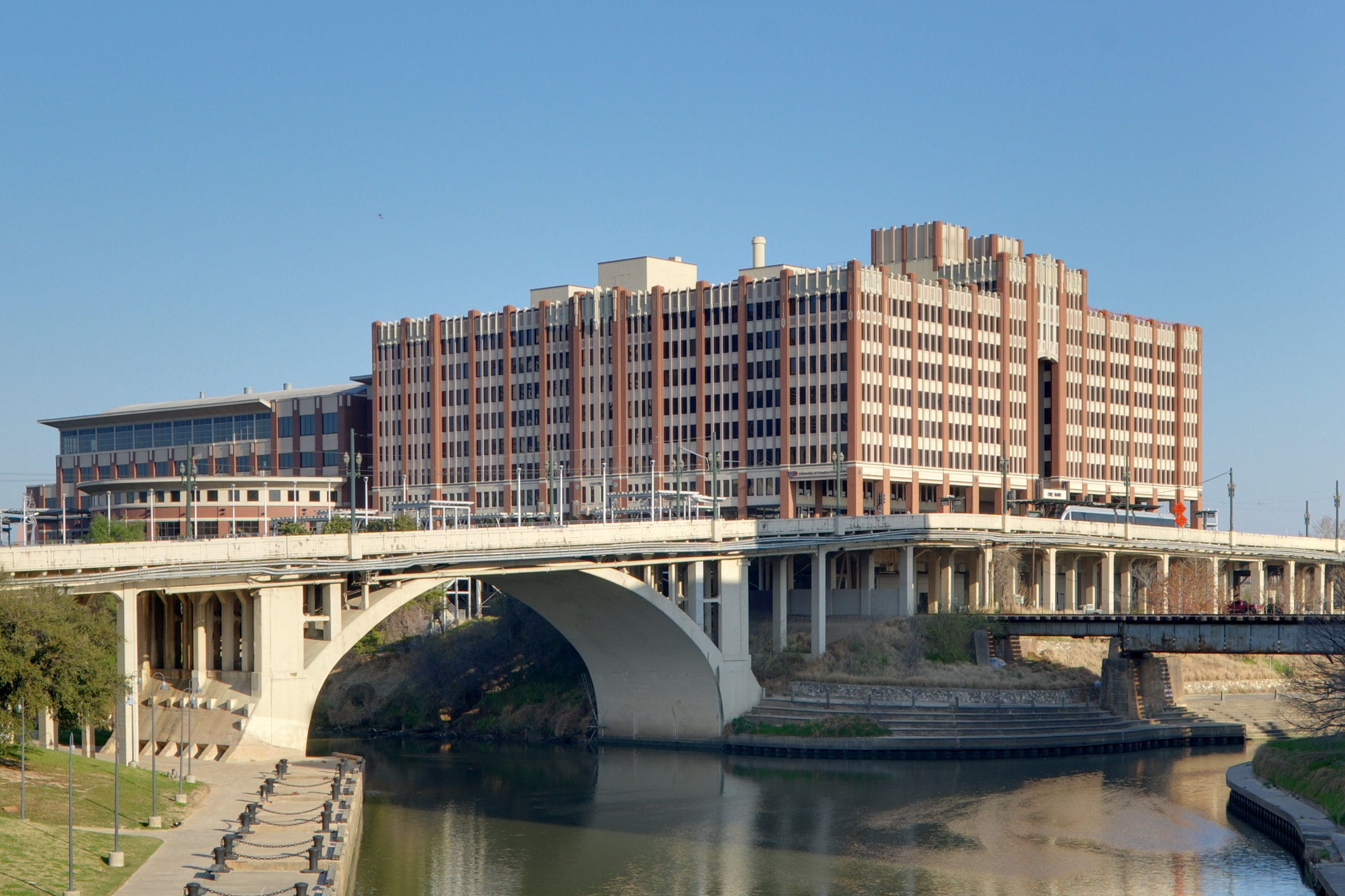
UH–Downtown

UH–Victoria

=== University of North Texas System ===
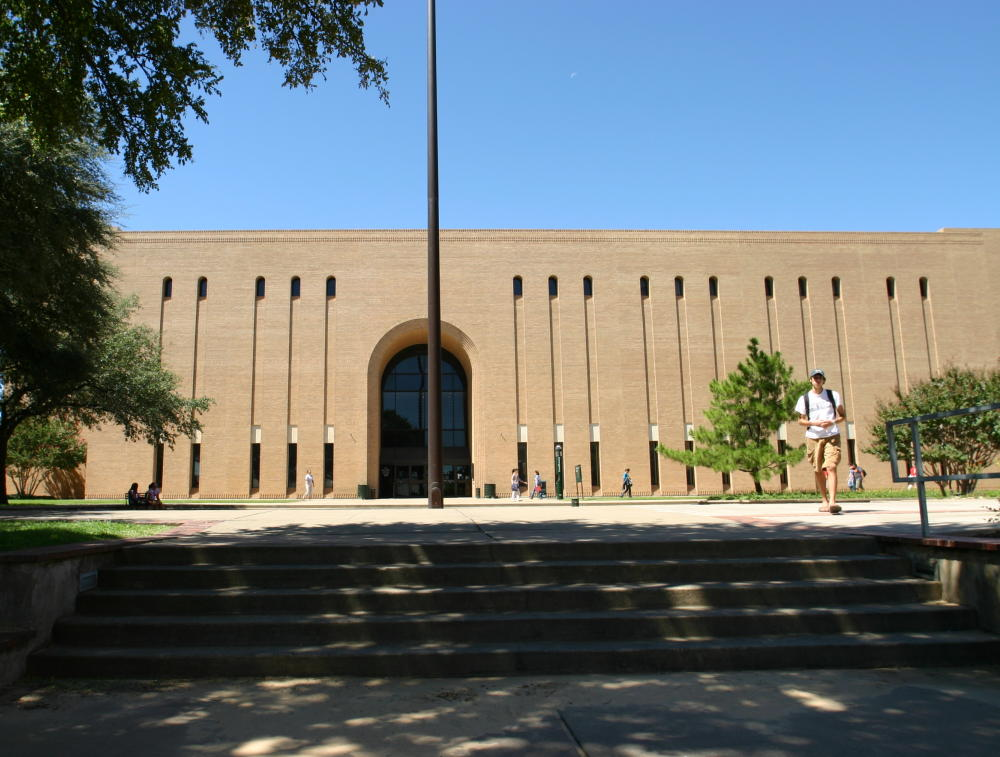
University of North Texas

The University of North Texas System (UNT System) has three schools in the North Texas region, all of which are in the Dallas/Fort Worth Metroplex.

The flagship institution is the University of North Texas (UNT) located in Denton, Texas. UNT is the largest university in the Metroplex and third largest in the state. The fields taught at UNT focus on such areas as business management, education, engineering, hospitality, music, and science.

The UNT System also oversees the University of North Texas at Dallas, the only public university located in the city limits of Dallas, and the University of North Texas Health Science Center at Fort Worth, the only college in Texas that specializes in osteopathic medicine.

=== University of Texas System ===
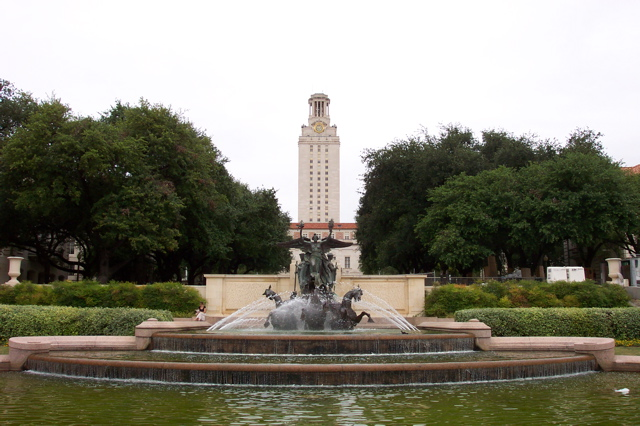
University of Texas at Austin

The University of Texas System, established by the Texas Constitution in 1883, consists of eight academic universities and six health institutions, with a seventh health institution to be established and a ninth academic institution to be added in the near future. UT System institutions enrolled a total of 182,752 students in fall 2004 making it one of the largest systems of higher education in the nation. In 2018, the system's flagship and largest institution, University of Texas at Austin, maintained an enrollment of 51,832 students. The University of Texas at Austin was once the largest institution in the United States, but it is now one of the top 10 largest by population. It is ranked as the 34th best global university by U.S. News & World Report. Seven doctoral programs at UT Austin rank in the top 10 in the nation and 22 degree programs rank in the top 25, according to a comprehensive study of the quality of graduate schools conducted by the United States National Research Council. Six of the 12 medical schools of Texas are within the University of Texas System. In 2004, the University of Texas Southwestern Medical Center at Dallas was ranked the 12th highest ranking medical school in the United States, with four of Texas's 11 Nobel laureates.

Stephen F. Austin State University in Nacogdoches, which operates one of two schools of forestry and the only one in the state's main timber-producing region of East Texas, joined the University of Texas System in 2023.

=== Texas A&M University System ===
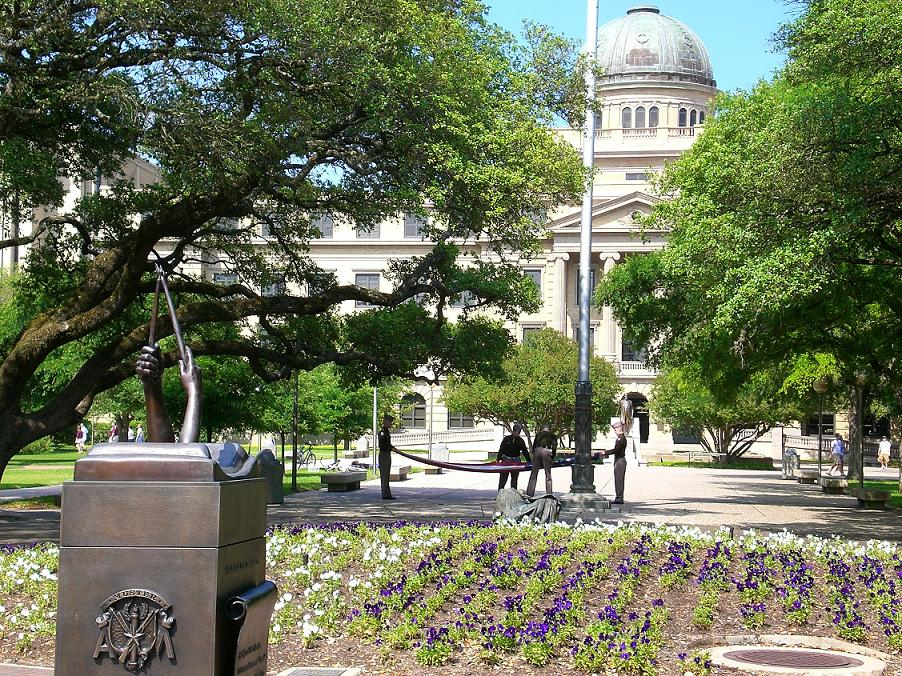
Texas A&M University

The Texas A&M University System, established by the 1871 Texas legislature, is the largest state university system of higher learning in Texas. Its flagship institution, Texas A&M University located in College Station, opened in 1876, is the state's oldest public institution of higher education, and, at over 62,000 students, has the largest student enrollment in the state of Texas. As opposed to the University of Texas System, which is primarily focused in urban centers, the Texas A&M System generally serves rural areas of the state.

Prairie View A&M University is a historically black university located in Prairie View, Texas (northwest of Houston) and is a member of the Texas A&M University System. PVAMU offers baccalaureate degrees in 50 academic majors, 37 master's degrees and four doctoral degree programs through nine colleges and schools. Founded in 1876, Prairie View A&M University is the second oldest state-sponsored institution of higher education in Texas.

=== Texas State University System ===
The Texas State University System, created in 1911 to oversee the state's normal schools (teachers' colleges), is the oldest multi-system University System in Texas. The system is the only one of the six Texas state university systems to be a horizontal system: it does not have a flagship institution and considers every campus to be unique in its own way. Over the years, several member schools have been moved to other university systems. Today, the system encompasses seven institutions; Texas State University, located halfway between Austin and San Antonio in San Marcos, is the largest university in the system with an enrollment of 38,694 students. Lamar University located in Beaumont and previously in its own system, joined the TSUS in 1995. It boast an enrollment of 14,384 students as of spring 2010 and is most notable for its highly respected engineering program. Sam Houston State University located in Huntsville is the 2nd largest university in the TSUS with 18,478 students and is home to one of the world's largest and best Criminal Justice Programs.

=== Texas Tech University System ===
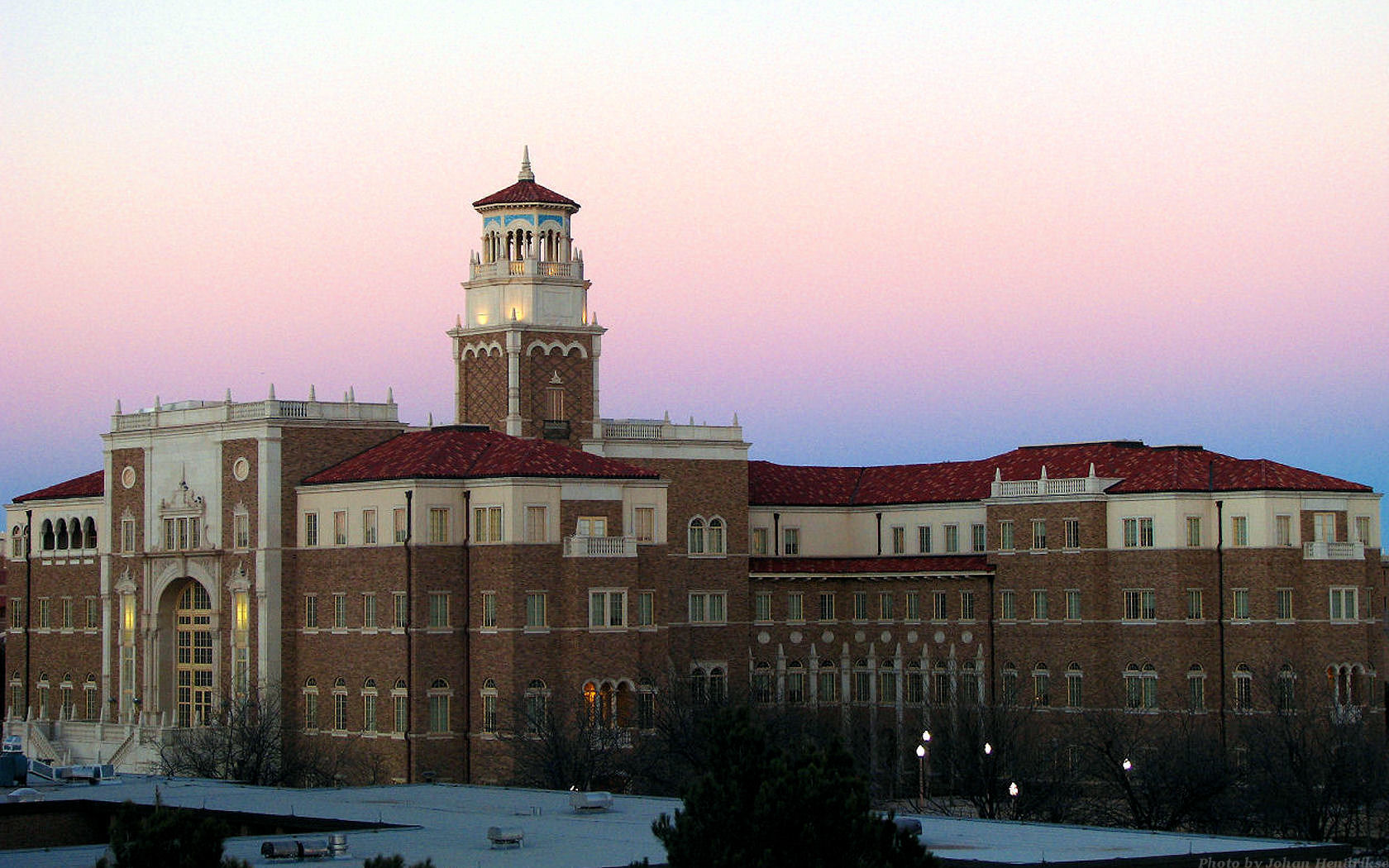
Texas Tech University

The Texas Tech University System was established in 1996, though the system's oldest institution, was founded in 1923. The system comprises four separate universities, of which two are academic institutions: Angelo State University and Texas Tech University, and two are health institutions: Texas Tech University Health Sciences Center, and Texas Tech University Health Sciences Center at El Paso.

Texas Tech University, founded as Texas Technological College in 1923, is the system's flagship institution located in Lubbock. The institution originally comprised only four schools: Agriculture, Engineering, Home Economics, and Liberal Arts. Today, the university includes eleven academic colleges, a graduate school and a school of law. The campus in Lubbock is shared with the Texas Tech University Health Sciences Center.

In 1969, a separate university named the Texas Tech University School of Medicine (now Texas Tech University Health Sciences Center (TTUHSC)), was founded as a multi-campus institution with Lubbock as the administrative center and with regional campuses at Amarillo, El Paso, and Odessa. The university was expanded to include nursing, pharmacy, and allied health sciences programs in 1979. The university has expanded to include campuses in Abilene, and Dallas.

In 2007, Angelo State University joined the Texas Tech University System leaving the Texas State University System, which it had been a member of since 1975.

On May 18, 2013, the former branch campus of TTUHSC in El Paso was established as the Texas Tech University Health Sciences Center at El Paso (TTUHSC El Paso) a separate university from TTUHSC with schools of medicine and nursing.

On August 6, 2020, the Texas Tech University System and Midwestern State University agreed to a memorandum of understanding to begin the process of MSU Texas becoming the fifth university to join the system. The process was completed on June 8, 2021, when Governor Greg Abbott signed HB 1522 into law.

=== Texas Woman's University System ===
On May 26, 2021, Texas Woman's University was established as the Texas Woman's University system according to a bill signed into law by Governor Greg Abbott. This law headquarters the system in Denton and allows the former Dallas and Houston Centers to become autonomous campuses.

=== Independent public universities ===
- Texas Southern University in Houston is unaffiliated with any of the seven systems. Texas Southern is the only historically black university in Texas to house a law and pharmacy school and one of only two public historically black universities in the state. Texas Southern was also the first state-supported institution in the city of Houston.

=== Texas State Technical College System ===
The state also operates the Texas State Technical College System, a group of two-year technical colleges located throughout the state. System headquarters are co-located with the flagship campus in Waco.

=== Community colleges ===
Several community colleges operate throughout the state of Texas. Although the state has established territorial jurisdictions for each college, the colleges themselves are governed by local boards of trustees, and are financed mainly through local property taxes.

The taxing area and the jurisdiction are not necessarily the same in all cases. As an example, the jurisdiction of North Central Texas College includes the counties of Cooke, Denton, and Montague, but only Cooke County property is subject to the property tax assessment. On the other hand, the jurisdiction and tax base for Tarrant County College are the same: Tarrant County.

== Private colleges and universities ==
=== Austin area ===
Institutions of higher education include Austin Presbyterian Theological Seminary, Concordia University Texas, Huston–Tillotson University, St. Edward's University, the Seminary of the Southwest, the Acton School of Business, Austin Graduate School of Theology, Austin Presbyterian Theological Seminary, Virginia College's Austin Campus, The Art Institute of Austin, and a branch of Park University.

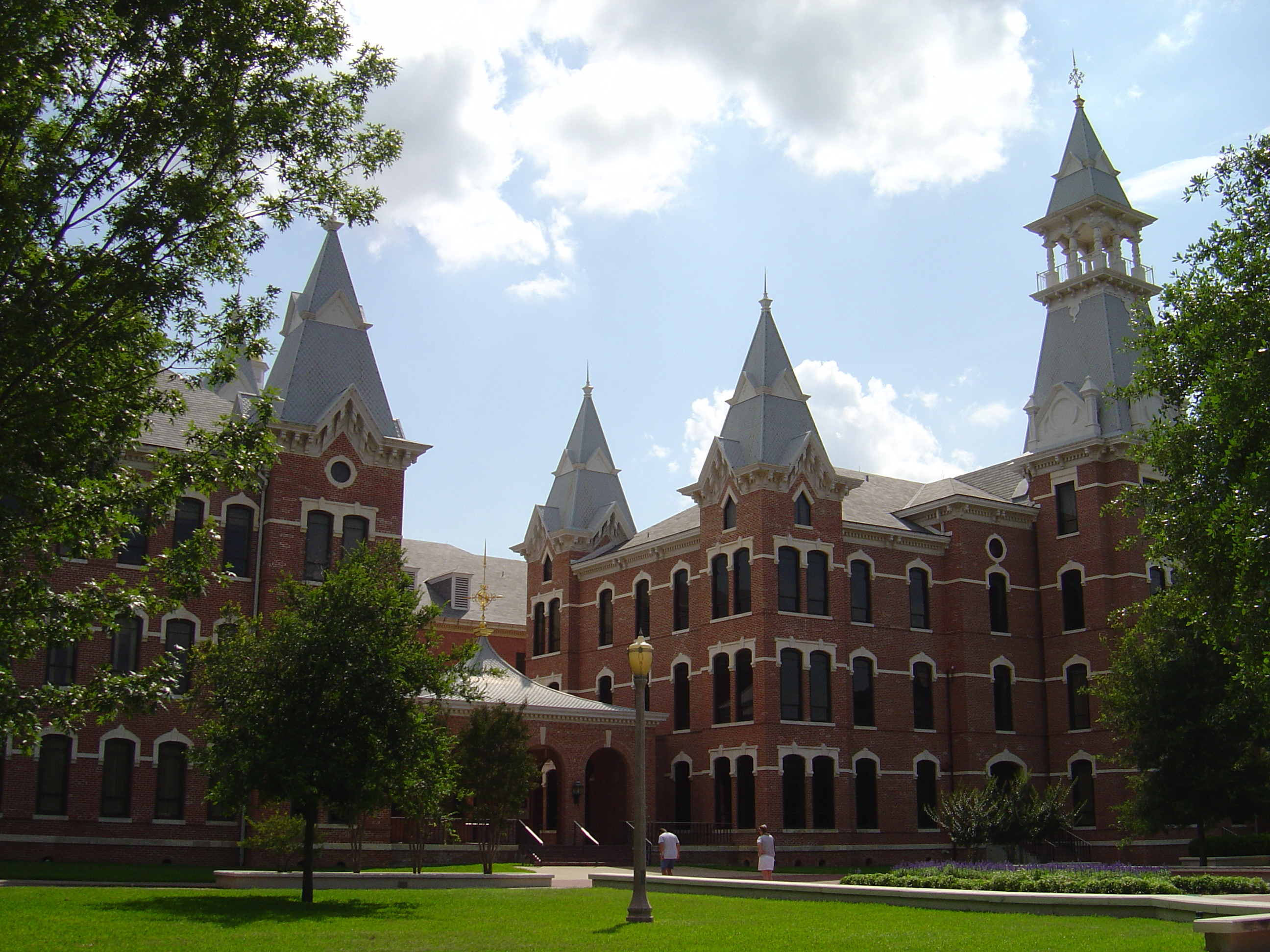
In Waco is Baylor University, chartered in 1845. It is the largest Baptist university in the world, with over 14,000 students.

=== Central Texas outside Austin ===
Howard Payne University is a Baptist university in Brownwood, Texas. In 1953 it absorbed Daniel Baker College, a Presbyterian college in Brownwood

In Abilene are Hardin–Simmons University (Baptist), McMurry University (Methodist), and Abilene Christian University (Churches of Christ). Belton has The University of Mary Hardin–Baylor (Baptist).

Southwestern University is a private university in Georgetown. It originated in four different Methodist schools from 1840 to 1865. They merged in 1873.

=== Dallas–Fort Worth area ===
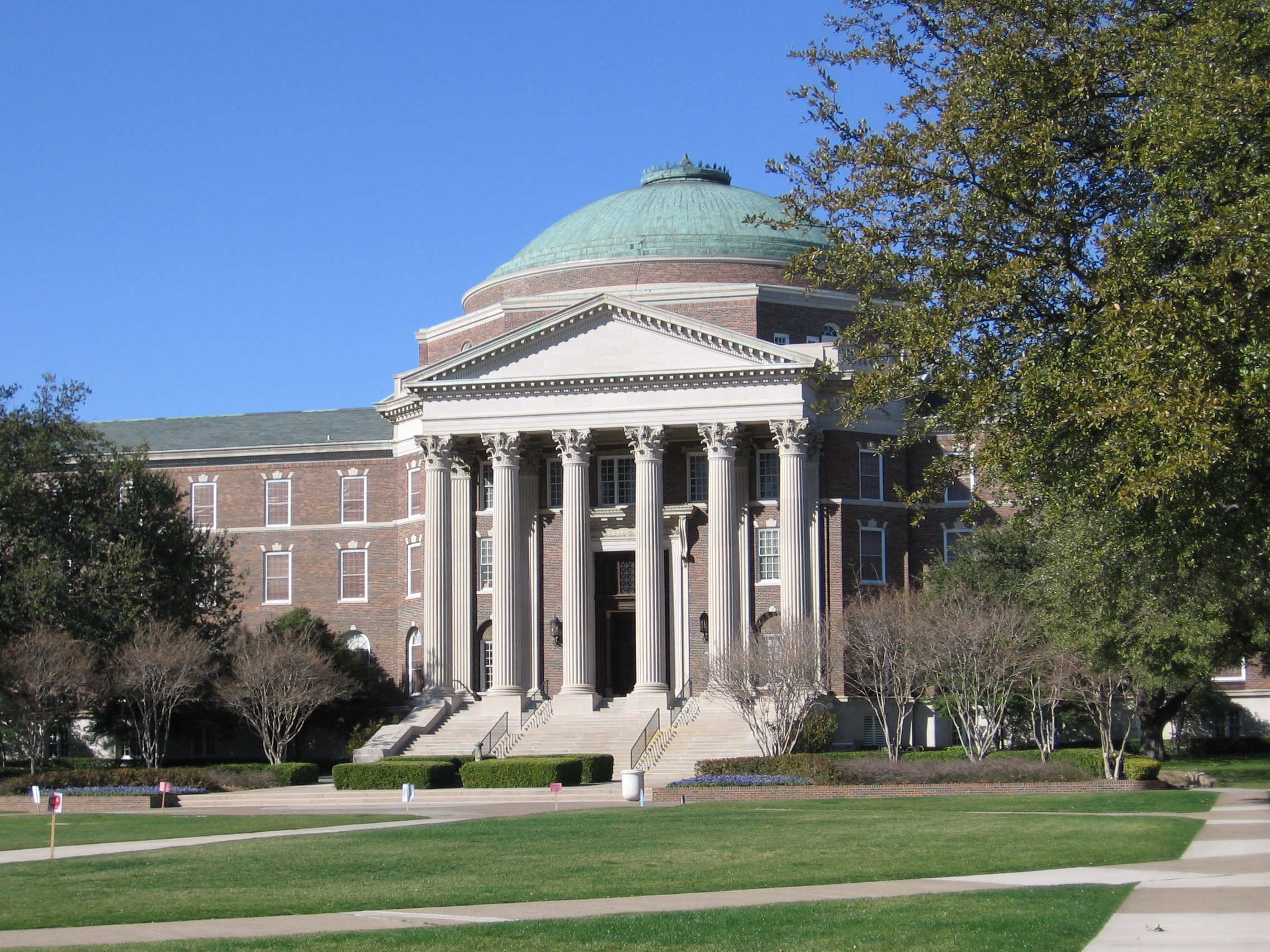
Southern Methodist University in Dallas

The Dallas–Fort Worth metroplex is home to University of Dallas (Catholic); Texas Wesleyan University (Methodist); Texas Christian University (Disciples of Christ); Dallas Baptist University; Southern Methodist University; and Paul Quinn College (Methodist).

Austin College (Presbyterian) chartered in 1849, is in Sherman, 60 miles north of Dallas.

=== Houston area ===
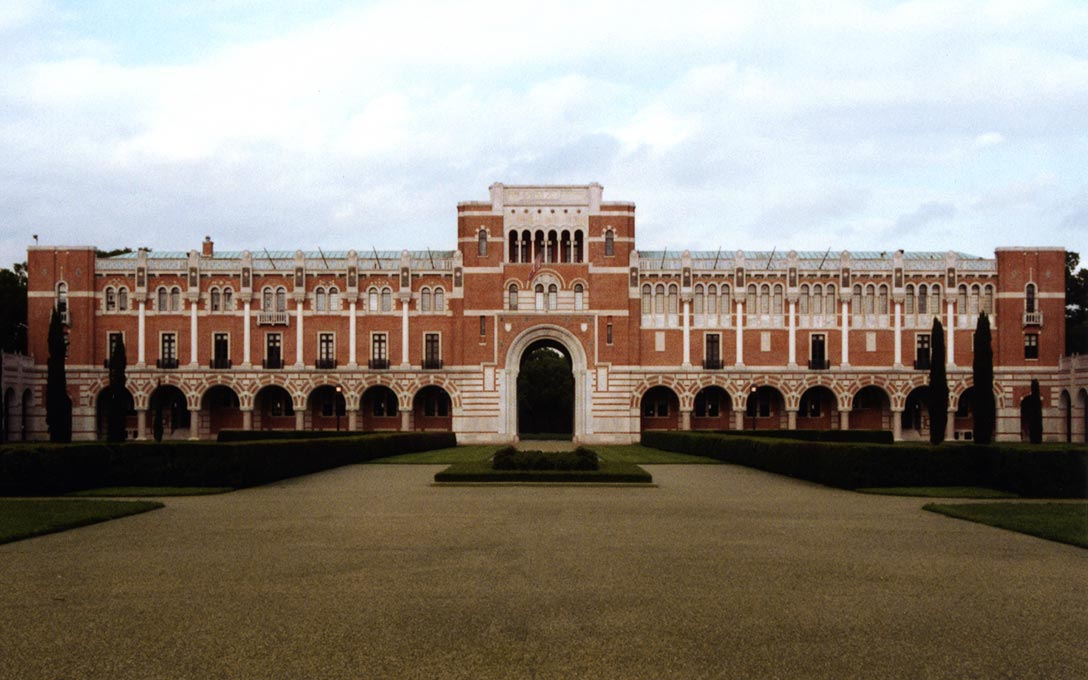
Rice University

Rice University was founded in 1912 as a non-sectarian institution.

The University of St. Thomas (Catholic) was founded in 1947. Houston Christian University (Baptist) was founded in 1960.

=== Panhandle area ===
Lubbock Christian University is a Churches of Christ university in Lubbock.

Wayland Baptist University is located in Plainview. It operates campuses in Amarillo, Lubbock, San Antonio, and Wichita Falls, It also maintains campuses out of Texas in Albuquerque, NM; Altus, OK; Anchorage, AK; Clovis, NM; Fairbanks, AK; Mililani, HI; Phoenix, AZ; and Sierra Vista, AZ. Several of the campuses have satellite locations in other cities in their area and on many of the military bases nearby. The university also offers courses in American Samoa, Kenya, and on-line.

=== San Antonio area ===
Private universities in the area are Texas Lutheran University; Trinity University (Presbyterian); and the Catholics schools St. Mary's University, University of the Incarnate Word, and Our Lady of the Lake University.

=== HBCU (Historically Black Colleges and Universities) ===
Huston–Tillotson University; Jarvis Christian University; Paul Quinn College; Prairie View A&M University; Southwestern Christian College; St. Philip's College; Texas College; Texas Southern University; and Wiley University. Defunct HBCU include Bishop College; Guadalupe College.

== Presidential libraries ==
Texas has three presidential libraries: the Lyndon Baines Johnson Library and Museum at The University of Texas at Austin, the George Bush Presidential Library at Texas A&M University, and the George W. Bush Presidential Center at Southern Methodist University.

== Medical research ==
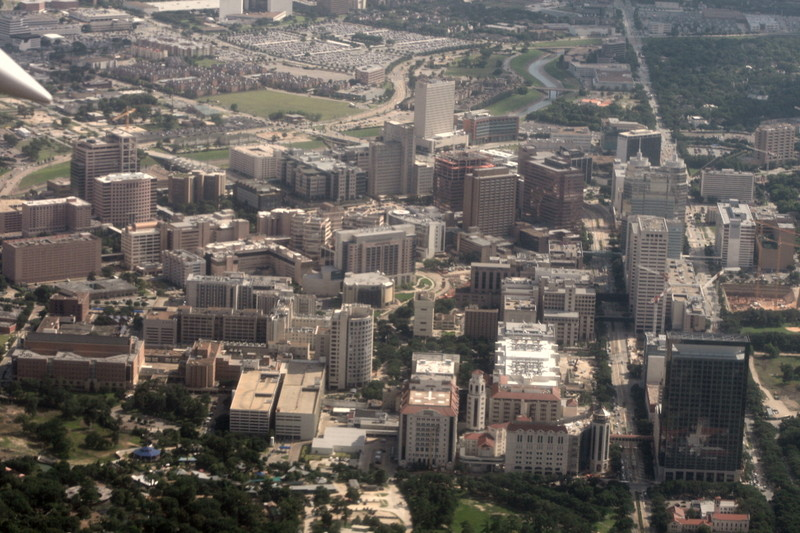
Aerial of Texas Medical Center in Houston

Texas is home to several research medical centers. The state has 12 allopathic medical schools, three osteopathic medical schools, four dental schools, and two optometry schools. Texas has two Biosafety Level 4 (BSL-4) laboratories: one at The University of Texas Medical Branch (UTMB) in Galveston, and the other at the Southwest Foundation for Biomedical Research in San Antonio—the first privately owned BSL-4 lab in the United States.

The Texas Medical Center, in Houston, is the world's largest concentration of research and healthcare institutions, with 45 member institutions in the Texas Medical Center, including McGovern Medical School. More heart transplants are performed at Texas Medical Center than anywhere else in the world. San Antonio's South Texas Medical Center facilities rank sixth in clinical medicine research impact in the United States. The University of Texas M. D. Anderson Cancer Center is one of the world's highly regarded academic institutions devoted to cancer patient care, research, education and prevention.

== Texas Digital Library ==
The Texas Digital Library is a consortium of institutions of higher education in the state of Texas. The consortium provides an infrastructure for scholarly activity of its members. Support currently includes an Electronic Theses and Dissertations system and Institutional Repository support.

== See also ==
- History of African Americans in Texas
- List of colleges and universities in Texas
- Texas Education Agency, the state agency in charge
