= David Vanderpool =

American medical doctor (born 1960)

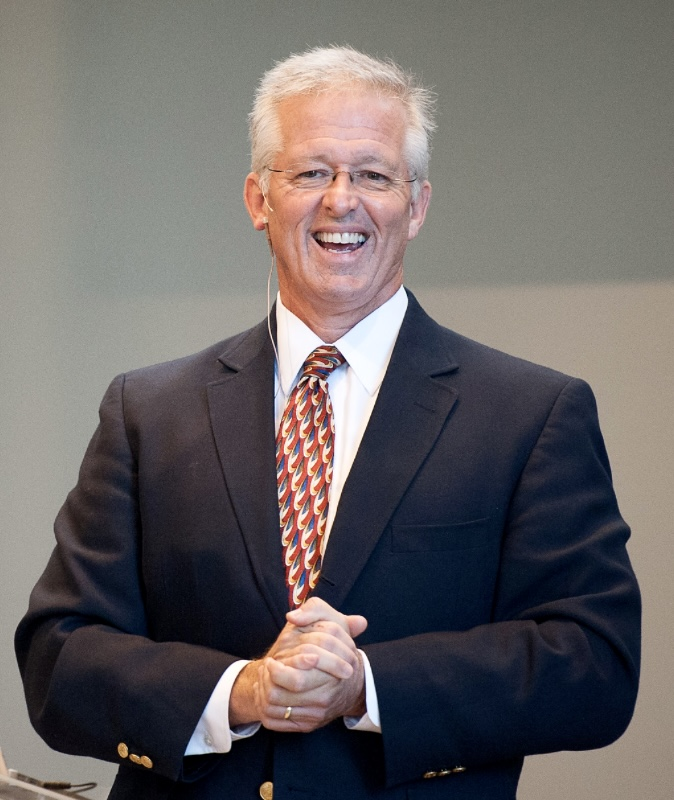
- David Vanderpool
- Born: February 18, 1960 (age 66); Dallas, Texas, U.S.
- Education: Abilene Christian University, Texas Tech University Health Sciences Center, Baylor University Medical Center
- Occupations: Trauma and general surgeon, CEO of Live Beyond

David Vanderpool (born February 18, 1960) is an American medical doctor and the CEO and founder of LiveBeyond, an international humanitarian development organization which has provided medical, spiritual and logistical support to disaster-ridden countries.

Vanderpool has worked in numerous countries around the world providing medical care and clean water.

== Early life and education ==
Vanderpool was born in Dallas, Texas, graduated from St. Mark's School of Texas, and received his undergraduate degree from Abilene Christian University in 1982. He then attended the School of Medicine at Texas Tech University Health Sciences Center. After medical school, Vanderpool completed a surgical residency at Baylor University Medical Center where he trained as a general surgeon.

== Family ==
Vanderpool wife, Laurie, is a speaker for women's retreats and Bible Studies, and speaks frequently for Down syndrome organizations.

== Early career ==
Vanderpool remained in Texas after residency and practiced as a general surgeon before moving to Brentwood, Tennessee in 2001 and opening his private practice Lave MD in 2003.

Dr. Vanderpool created Lave MD which served as a varicose vein treatment center. After the establishment of his international organization in 2005, Dr. Vanderpool used much of Lave MD's proceeds to fund the organization's efforts abroad.

== Medical work and disaster relief ==
In 2005, after Hurricane Katrina hit the southeastern part of the United States, Dr. Vanderpool delivered healthcare across the Mississippi Coast out of a trailer. His goal was to provide as much free healthcare as possible while the medical infrastructure recovered. Months later, Dr. Vanderpool established his organization, Mobile Medical Disaster Relief, as a 501(c)(3) non-profit organization with goals to provide disaster relief through medical clinics, clean water projects, and micro-finance projects to areas hit by disasters.

Vanderpool and the Mobile Medical Disaster Relief team began working in Mozambique in 2006. His goal was to provide healthcare to the indigenous people of the country in addition to enhancing the economy by implementing micro-finance projects among widows living in the communities. By 2008, Dr. Vanderpool teamed up with the Belmont School of Nursing to construct a nursing curriculum that could teach the Mozambique women to be self-sufficient in caring for themselves and their children.

Vanderpool and Mobile Medical Disaster Relief partnered with PACODEP (Partners in Community Development) in Ghana in order to provide medical care, educate local people on water purification, and distribute water purifiers. PACODEP works to free enslaved children who are trafficked through Ghana for purposes of fishing work. Dr. Vanderpool has also partnered with local hospitals in Ghana in order to provide free surgeries to these rescued children.

Dr. Vanderpool partnered with Mission Lazarus in 2009 to build and supply a sustainable medical clinic in Cedeño, Honduras.

=== LiveBeyond in Haiti ===
Dr. Vanderpool shifted his focus in the aftermath of the earthquake that devastated the entire country of Haiti in 2010. In 2010, Vanderpool officially changed the name of his organization from Mobile Medical Disaster Relief to LiveBeyond with a stated mission to be "an organization that chooses to LiveBeyond...ourselves, our culture, our borders and this life so that others can LiveBeyond…disease, hunger, poverty and despair."

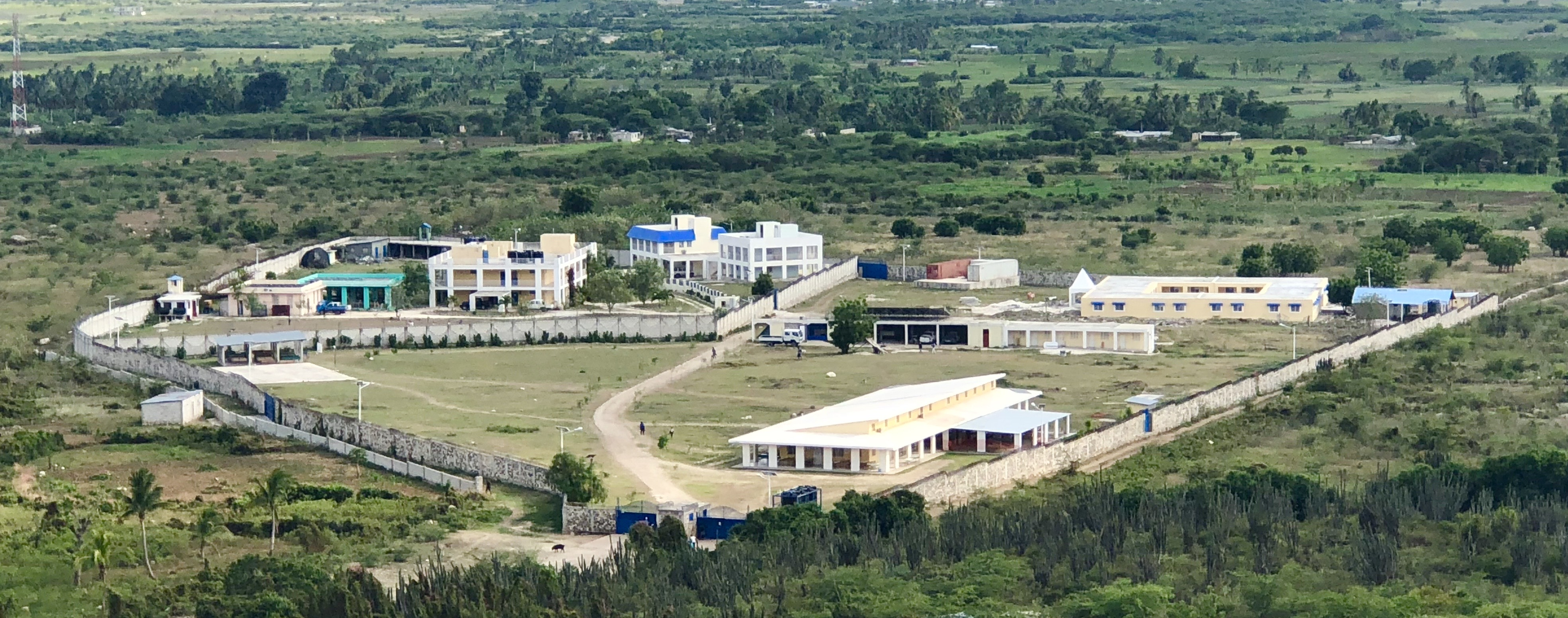
aerial view of LiveBeyond base in Thomazeau, Haiti

The initial aid Vanderpool and his team brought to Haiti was primarily mobile medical care to relieve the thousands devastated and injured by the earthquake. Since then however, Vanderpool has grounded his work in Thomazeau, Haiti where his organization began building a base. Vanderpool continued to provide free medical care, establishing a surgical hospital and clinic. In addition, clean water projects, agricultural projects, a nutrition program, and other widow and orphan advocacy projects were begun.

The LiveBeyond base has a medical clinic, a school, a maternal health program, a child nutrition program, and a demonstration farm. The Maternal Health program serves pregnant and nursing mothers and their babies from conception until the child is 2 years old - the first 1,000 days of life. The Child Nutrition program serves 7,700 children daily. LiveBeyond also has a program called Johnny's Kids for mentally and physically disabled people in honor of Laurie's late brother, John Mark "Johnny" Stallings.

=== LiveBeyond in Jerusalem ===
In 2021, LiveBeyond created Johnny's Kids Jerusalem to serve 40 disabled people in the Jerusalem area.

== LiveBeyond: A Radical Call to Surrender and Serve and other publications ==
In January 2020, Dr. Vanderpool published his first book, a memoir of his life leading to the founding of LiveBeyond. Dr. Vanderpool has since published two ebooks: "Results-Oriented Nonprofits: Using Data to Improve Your Programs and Healthy Moms" and "Healthy Babies, Healthy Communities: The First One Thousand Days of a Baby's Life".
