= Texas Tech University Health Sciences Center School of Medicine =

Medical school in Lubbock, Texas, US

Coordinates: 33°35′24″N 101°53′25″W

- Motto: From here, it's possible.
- Type: State university
- Established: May 1969
- Affiliations: Texas Tech University System
- Chancellor: Tedd Mitchell, MD
- President: Lori Rice-Spearman, PhD
- Dean: John DeToledo, MD (Medicine)
- Students: 550
- Location: Lubbock, Texas, U.S.
- Campus: Urban
- Website: http://www.ttuhsc.edu/medicine/

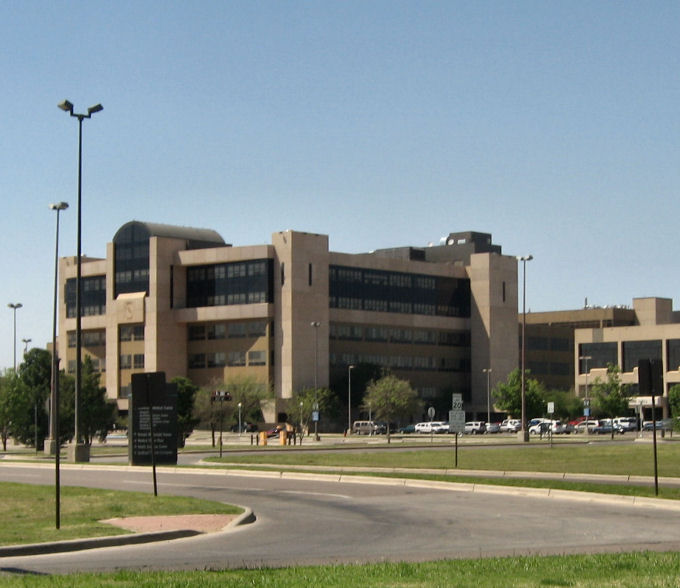
University Medical Center, the teaching hospital of Texas Tech University Health Sciences Center in Lubbock

The Texas Tech University Health Sciences Center School of Medicine (TTUHSC SOM) is the medical school of Texas Tech University Health Sciences Center (TTUHSC) in Lubbock, Texas, United States. TTUHSC SOM was originally chartered in 1969 to train more physicians for the underserved populations of the West Texas region. As of 2011, the School of Medicine has awarded over 4,000 Doctor of Medicine degrees. The school offers the traditional four-year curriculum, as well as an accelerated three-year track, and joint degree programs with Texas Tech University.

== History ==
The School of Medicine (SOM) located in Lubbock, Texas was established as the Texas Tech University School of Medicine in 1969 by the 61st Texas Legislature, and the SOM first graduated Doctors of Medicine in 1974. The SOM has grown into the Texas Tech University Health Sciences Center (TTUHSC), and the SOM is now just one school within TTUHSC. The SOM was commissioned to educate physicians to serve West Texas. Currently, 20% of physicians in West Texas were trained at TTUHSC. Often, graduating physicians have gone on to train at Texas residency training programs or other top hospitals throughout the country including those associated with Cleveland Clinic, Duke, Johns Hopkins, Mayo Clinic, Massachusetts General Hospital, Mt. Sinai Hospital, University of Pittsburgh, University of Washington, Stanford, Vanderbilt, and Washington University in St. Louis.

In 2019, Texas Tech University Health Sciences Center announced it would no longer consider race in admissions.

In its 2023-2024 Rankings, U.S. News & World Report ranked the medical school #19 for primary care, and #96 for research. Additionally, TTUHSC SOM was ranked #33 amongst medical schools for producing the most graduates practicing in rural areas.

== Teaching and training facilities ==
Didactic training during the first two years of medical school takes place in the Academic Classroom Building (ACB) at the Texas Tech University Health Sciences Center (HSC) in Lubbock, Texas. The ACB was built in 2003 and is over 62,000 square feet. It contains two large lecture halls, three medium-sized lecture halls, eleven conference rooms, open study spaces, and a large laboratory space for neuroanatomy studies. The anatomy laboratory is located in an adjoining HSC building. Simulated clinical experiences also take place in an adjoining HSC building in the school's SimLife Center. The center's more than 24,000 square feet of space were completed in 2010. The HSC is physically connected to the county hospital, University Medical Center (UMC).

Students are assigned to a clinical training location during their last two years of schooling. Clinical training can take place in Lubbock, Amarillo, or Midland-Odessa. Clinical training in Lubbock takes place primarily at UMC and the outpatient clinic buildings surrounding the hospital.

== Curriculum ==
The SOM has a traditional four-year curriculum and an accelerated 3-year curriculum. In addition to graduating with a Doctor of Medicine degree, some students are able to enroll in joint-degree granting programs. At some point during the education of each student, each student participates in two years of preliminary didactic coursework and then participates in six 8-week blocks of clinical clerkship training in the following areas of medicine: Family Medicine, Internal Medicine, Obstetrics & Gynecology, Pediatrics, Psychiatry, and Surgery. Students (except Baylor College of Dentistry students) also participate in a 4-week rotation in a Critical Care environment (Medical Intensive Care Unit, Pediatric Intensive Care Unit, Surgery Intensive Care Unit, or Emergency Medicine), a Subinternship hospital experience in a specialty of medicine (Family Medicine, Internal Medicine, Pediatrics, or Surgery), and a 2-week rotation in Geriatrics & Palliative Care Medicine.

=== Four-year curriculum ===
Medical students enrolled in the traditional four-year curriculum participate in didactic coursework and elementary clinical work at the Lubbock campus for the first two years. Students need to pass the USMLE Step 1 exam before continuing with the third year curriculum. Clinical clerkships comprise the third and fourth years of medical school and are carried out at one of TTUHSC's campuses in Lubbock, Amarillo, or the Permian Basin. Each student is assigned to a single campus for the third and fourth year.

Texas Tech also operates a four-year school of medicine in El Paso, the Paul L. Foster School of Medicine.

=== Three-year curriculum ===
Concerning three year curriculum, the SOM made news in 2010 when it announced an accelerated path to obtain a Doctor of Medicine (M.D.). The SOM is the first United States school to offer a three-year track to obtain a M.D. Other schools are considering creating similar tracks. The curriculum is termed the Family Medicine Accelerated Track (F-MAT). The curriculum is similar to the traditional four-year curriculum, but the students in the F-MAT are required to participate in added clinical coursework beginning the summer following the first year of classes. The required curriculum is condensed into three years of education, and time is not available for elective rotations that traditionally occur during the fourth year of education.

A student wishing to participate in the F-MAT must first be accepted into the SOM. Application for the F-MAT takes place during the student's first year of medical school. Twelve members from each first-year class will be accepted into the program. By participating in F-MAT, the student agrees to rank the Family Medicine residency where they had performed their clinical clerkship training during the third and final year of medical school as their top choice in the National Resident Matching Program.

=== M.D./J.D. dual degrees ===
Medicine / Doctor of Jurisprudence (J.D.) dual degree program is awarded by the TTUHSC SOM and the Texas Tech University School of Law. In this six-year program, the first two years are spent studying law, and the remaining four years are spent studying medicine.

=== M.D./PhD dual degrees ===
Medicine / Doctor of Philosophy (PhD) dual degree is awarded by the TTUHSC SOM and the TTUHSC Graduate School of Biomedical Sciences. The students in this program complete their first two years of medical school and take the USMLE Step 1 exam before beginning full-time study in the PhD program. The students work with researchers during the summers after their first and second years of medical school in order to identify a PhD mentor. The school suggests that the PhD work is typically completed in three years, although the school has not published any statistics that substantiate this claim. After completing the PhD dissertation, the students then finish the final third and fourth years of medical school.

=== M.D./MBA dual degrees ===
Medicine / Master of Business Administration (MBA) in Health Organization Management dual degree is awarded by the TTUHSC SOM and the Texas Tech University Rawls College of Business. Students complete both degree programs in four years by taking MBA classes during the first and second year of medical school, as well as during the summer between the first and second year of medical school.

== Admissions ==
Approximately 3,000 applicants apply to TTUHSC SOM annually, and about one-quarter of these applicants are interviewed by the school. Approximately 180 students matriculate each year. The average matriculant has an MCAT score greater than 31 and a GPA of 3.65. Applicants apply to the school via the Texas Medical & Dental Schools Application Service (TMDSAS). Several less frequently used means of application and acceptance include application through the Joint Admission Medical Program, application through the Association of American Medical Colleges Early Decision Program, early acceptance through the Texas Tech University Honors College, or early acceptance directly out of high school via the Undergraduate to Medical School Initiative.

== Tuition ==
Annual tuition and fees for the 2010–2011 academic year for Texas residents was $14,471 and for out-of-state residents was $27,571. TTUHSC SOM estimates that the debt acquired by a student pursuing the F-MAT will be about half that of a typical student because the student will graduate a year early, and the student will be granted one year's worth of tuition.
