= Ted Reid =

American biochemist and academic

Ted Warren Reid (born September 26, 1939) is an American biochemist and ophthalmic researcher. He is professor of Ophthalmology & Visual Sciences at Texas Tech University Health Sciences Center (TTUHSC) and Director of the Ocular Cell Biology program. In 2023, he was elected Senior Member of the National Academy of Inventors.

== Education and career ==
He earned his Bachelor of Arts degree from Occidental College in 1961 and went on to receive his Master of Science from the University of Arizona in 1963. He earned his Ph.D. in biochemistry at UCLA in 1967.

In 1984, Reid joined University of California, Davis as Professor of Ophthalmology and Biological Sciences serving until 1990. He was appointed professor at Texas Tech University Health Sciences Center, where he remains active. At Texas Tech University Health Sciences Center, he held Vice Chair of the Department

== Research ==
Reid's early research focused on the mechanisms of enzymes such as pepsin and alkaline phosphatase. His work elucidated the roles of active site carboxyl groups, isotope effects, and enzyme conformers in hydrolysis reactions.

He developed a contact lens with a thin selenium coating designed to prevent bacterial growth, explaining that selenium catalyzes the formation of superoxide which reacts to destroy bacterial and viral cells on contact.
