= Steven Berk =

Steven Berk may refer to:

- Steven L. Berk (1949–2023), American physician and writer
- Steven N. Berk (born 1959), American lawyer
