= Texas Higher Education Coordinating Board =

Government agency in Austin, Texas, U.S.

Agency overview
- Formed: 1965
- Headquarters: Austin, Texas, U.S.
- Employees: 359
- Agency executive: Wynn Rosser, Commissioner
- Website: www.highered.texas.gov

The Texas Higher Education Coordinating Board (THECB) is an agency of the U.S. state of Texas's government that oversees all public post-secondary education in the state. It is headquartered at 1801 North Congress Avenue in Austin.

THECB determines which Texas public four-year universities are permitted to start or continue degree programs. THECB also evaluates degrees from other states and other nations for use in Texas. However, operations of the various universities or systems are the responsibility of each university or system board of regents.

== History ==
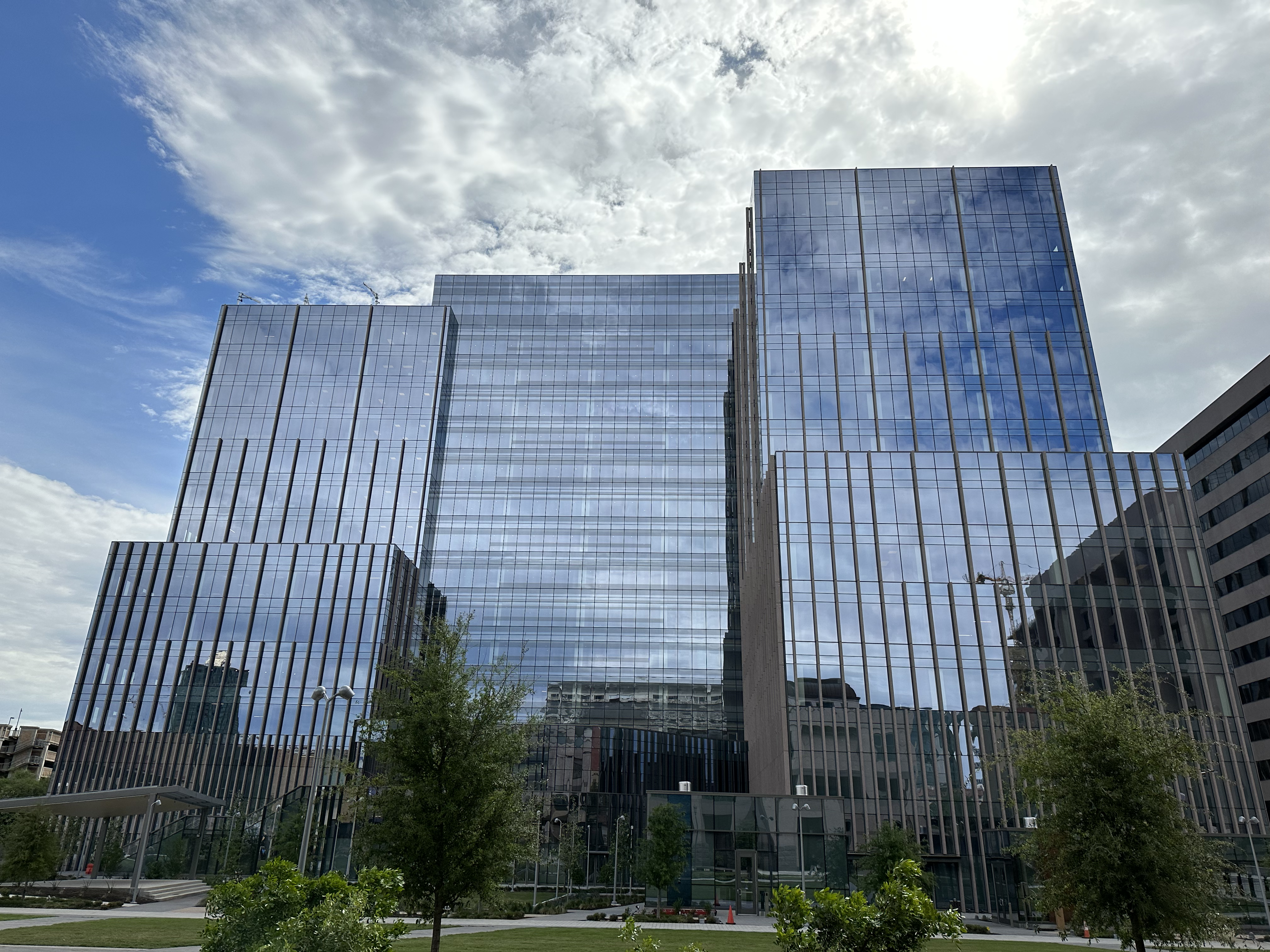
The Texas Higher Education Coordinating Board is located in the George HW Bush State Office Building

The THECB was established in 1965 by the 59th Texas Legislature through House Bill 1. It was created in response to the rapid expansion of higher education in the state and growing concerns about duplication of programs, rising costs, and inconsistent academic quality. The agency was tasked with coordinating the development of public higher education across Texas, ensuring efficient use of state resources, and supporting long-term educational planning.

== Strategic planning ==
From 1998 to 2003, it developed a higher-education plan for the state, called "Closing the Gaps by 2015". The plan's primary purpose was to close education gaps within Texas, as well as between Texas and other U.S. states. The four main goals of the plan were closing gaps in student participation, student success, excellence and research. In June 2016, the THECB released its final progress report on the state's success in meeting most of the targeted goals. The goal for enrollment of 630,000 students from fall 2000 to 2015, fell short by 25,000.

In 2015, the THECB officially adopted a new 15-year strategic plan called "60x30TX" and then implemented statewide. With the 60x30TX plan, Texas aims to award a total of 6.4 million certificates or degrees by 2030. The plan also sets targets for Hispanic, African American, male, and economically disadvantaged completers.

THECB updated its state’s goals for higher education and adopted a new strategic plan in 2022 called “Building a Talent Strong Texas” with new targets beyond those in the 60x30TX plan.

== Board members ==
The board is composed of nine voting members, one non-voting student representative, and a commissioner of higher education. The members and student representative are appointed by the governor of Texas on a staggered basis. Voting members serve six-year terms ending on August 31 of odd-numbered years, while the student representative serves a one-year term.

The board appoints the commissioner of higher education, who serves as the chief executive officer of the THECB. The current commissioner is Wynn Rosser, who assumed the post on November 15, 2024. He succeeded Harrison Keller, who had been the commissioner since 2019.

== List of commissioners ==
#	Commissioner	Term
1	Jack Williams	1966–1968
2	Bevington Reed	1968–1976
3	Kenneth H. Ashworth	1976–1997
4	Don W. Brown	1997–2004
5	Raymund A. Paredes	2004–2019
6	Harrison Keller	2019–2024
7	Wynn Rosser	2024–present

== See also ==
- Carnegie Classification of Institutions of Higher Education
- Center for Measuring University Performance
- List of research universities in the United States
- Research I university
- Education in Texas
- List of colleges and universities in Texas
- List of public universities in Texas by enrollment
