= Tom Shires =

American surgeon (1925–2007)

G. Tom Shires
- Born: November 22, 1925; Waco, Texas, US
- Died: October 18, 2007 (aged 81); Henderson, Nevada, US
- Education: University of Texas, Dallas, US
- Known for: Shock
- Scientific career
- Fields: Surgery
- Workplaces: University of Texas, Dallas; University of Washington, Seattle; Cornell University, New York; Texas Tech University Health Sciences Center, Lubbock; University of Nevada, Las Vegas, US

George Thomas Shires (November 22, 1925 – October 18, 2007) was an American trauma surgeon. He is known for his research on shock, which initiated the current practice of giving saline to trauma and surgical patients. He operated on John Connally and Lee Harvey Oswald after the assassination of John F. Kennedy.

== Biography ==
Born in Waco, Texas Shires was brought up in Dallas. He graduated from Woodrow Wilson High School (Dallas, Texas) in 1942 and thereafter gained a B.S. degree from the University of Texas (1944), and an M.D. degree from the Southwestern Medical School, a school that opened five years earlier and is now called the University of Texas Southwestern Medical School (1948).

During his time as an undergraduate at Texas, Shires was initiated into the Pi Kappa Alpha fraternity.

He was married to Robbie Jo Shires (Martin); the couple had a son and two daughters. Shires died of gastrointestinal cancer at Henderson, Nevada in 2007.

== Career ==
Shires served his residency at the Parkland Memorial Hospital in Dallas. He worked at the U.S. Naval Medical Research Institute in Bethesda (1949–1950) and as a surgeon in the U.S. Navy on the hospital ship USS Haven (1953–55). In 1957, he joined the faculty of the University of Texas Southwestern Medical School in Dallas, becoming chair of surgery in 1961. During his time in Dallas, he worked with the Dallas Fire Department to initiate one of the country's earliest paramedic systems.

In 1974, he briefly served as chair of surgery at the University of Washington in Seattle. Shires then became chair of surgery at Cornell University Medical College in New York in 1975, where he also served as dean and provost of medicine (1987–91). At Cornell, he was instrumental in establishing a trauma centre and, in 1976, a burns centre. Now part of the NewYork-Presbyterian Hospital/Weill Cornell Medical Center, the burns centre has become an internationally recognised facility which is among the busiest in the USA, treating a thousand patients annually. He was also involved in reorganising New York's emergency services.

From 1991 to 1995, Shires chaired the surgery department at Texas Tech University Health Sciences Center in Lubbock. He then served as director of the Trauma Institute at the University of Nevada at Las Vegas, a post he held until his death.

=== Assassination of John F. Kennedy ===
After President John F. Kennedy was shot in 1963, Shires was brought to Parkland Memorial Hospital from Galveston where he was speaking, by a NASA jet. Shires was then chief of surgery, and it was he who issued the statement that the president had been dead on arrival at the hospital. Shires successfully operated on John Connally, the Governor of Texas, who was also wounded in the assassination. These events coincidentally occurred on Shires’ birthday. He later also operated unsuccessfully on gunman Lee Harvey Oswald after he was shot by Jack Ruby. Shires later coincidentally died on Oswald’s birthday.

== Research and writing ==
Shires' research in the 1960s on the physiology of shock showed that, contrary to the practice of the time, surgical patients and patients with trauma require intravenous saline solution. According to Philip Barie (critical care and trauma chief at Cornell), this discovery "changed the practice of medicine" and was responsible for current medical practice.

His other research areas included the treatment of burns; management of the severe exfoliating disorders, toxic epidermal necrolysis and Stevens–Johnson syndrome; physiology of haemorrhage; responses to endotoxin; and the epidemiology of suicide.

He co-authored several books on surgery and trauma, including the well-known textbook Principles of Surgery, which was first published in 1969 and is currently in its seventh edition.

== Awards and honors ==
In 1985, Shires was ranked the top academic surgeon in the USA by Claude Organ, then president of the American College of Surgeons. He was among the first to receive a MERIT (Method to Extend Research in Time) grant from the NIH/National Institute of General Medical Sciences in 1986, for his work on saline solutions in shock.

His awards include the Surgeon's Award for Service to Safety (1984), Curtis P. Artz Memorial Award of the American Trauma Society (1984), Dr Rodman E. Sheen and Thomas G. Sheen Award (1985), Harvey Stuart Allen Distinguished Service Award of the American Burn Association (1988) and the Robert Danis Prize of the International Surgical Society (1993).

He served as president of the American Surgical Association (1979–80), American College of Surgeons (1981–82), the US chapter of the International Surgical Society (1984–85) and the James IV Association of Surgeons (1987–91). Shires was the editor-in-chief of the Journal of the American College of Surgeons (1982–92) and editor of Surgery, Gynecology and Obstetrics (1982–94). He also served on the editorial boards of many medical and surgical journals, including Annals of Surgery, Annual Review of Medicine, Archives of Surgery, American Journal of Surgery, Journal of Clinical Surgery and Journal of Trauma.

Shires was inducted into the Woodrow Wilson High School Hall of Fame in 1989 when it was created as part of the celebration of the school's 60th Anniversary.

== Selected publications ==
=== Books ===
- Shires GT, Carrico CJ, Canizaro PC. Shock (Major Problems in Clinical Surgery, Vol. 13) (Saunders, 1973) (ISBN 0721682502)
- Shires GT, ed. Shock and Related Problems (Churchill Livingstone; 1984) (ISBN 0443029016)
- Shires GT. Principles of Trauma Care, 3rd edn (McGraw-Hill; 1984) (ISBN 0070569177)
- Davis JM, Shires GT, eds. Host Defenses in Trauma and Surgery (Raven Press; 1986) (ISBN 0881672343)
- Shires GT, ed. Fluids, Electrolytes, and Acid Bases (Churchill Livingstone; 1988) (ISBN 0443085854)
- Davis JM, Shires GT, eds. Principles and Management of Surgical Infections (Lippincott; 1991) (ISBN 0397507356)
- Barie PS, Shires GT, eds. Surgical Intensive Care (Little, Brown; 1993) (ISBN 0316080837)
- Schwartz SI, Spencer FC, Galloway AC, Shires TG, Daly JM, Fischer JE. Principles of Surgery, 7th edn (McGraw-Hill; 1999) (ISBN 0070542562)

=== Research articles ===
- Shires, T; Jackson, DE (June 1962). "Postoperative salt tolerance". Arch Surg. 84: 703–6. PMID 13912108.
- Shires, GT; Cunningham, JN; Backer, CR; et al. (September 1972). "Alterations in cellular membrane function during hemorrhagic shock in primates". Ann. Surg. 176: 288–95. PMC 1355392. PMID 4627396.
- Hefton, JM; Madden, MR; Finkelstein, JL; Shires, GT (August 1983). "Grafting of burn patients with allografts of cultured epidermal cells". Lancet. 2: 428–30. PMID 6135914.
- Halebian, PH; Corder, VJ; Madden, MR; Finklestein, JL; Shires, GT (November 1986). "Improved burn center survival of patients with toxic epidermal necrolysis managed without corticosteroids". Ann. Surg. 204: 503–12. PMC 1251332. PMID 3767483.
- Fong, YM; Marano, MA; Barber, A; et al. (October 1989). "Total parenteral nutrition and bowel rest modify the metabolic response to endotoxin in humans". Ann. Surg. 210: 449–56, discussion 456–7. PMC 1357921. PMID 2508583.
- Fong, YM; Marano, MA; Moldawer, LL; et al. (June 1990). "The acute splanchnic and peripheral tissue metabolic response to endotoxin in humans". J. Clin. Invest. 85: 1896–904. doi:10.1172/JCI114651. PMC 296656. PMID 2347917.
