= List of public universities in Texas by enrollment =

The following is a list of public universities in Texas by enrollment.

List of Public Universities in Texas by Fall Enrollment
University	2025	2024	2023	2022	2021	2020	2019	2018	2017	2016	2015	2014	2013
Texas A&M University	77,491		74,829	66,057	65,272	63,859	63,694	62,915	60,435	58,515	60,507	58,219	56,378
University of Texas at Austin	53,082		52,384	51,786	50,282	50,894	51,684	51,427	51,281	50,950	51,312	52,059	52,213
University of North Texas	43,568		46,940	44,532	42,168	40,653	39,192	38,087	38,094	37,979	37,175	36,164	36,168
University of Houston	48,972		46,676	46,148	46,971	47,060	46,148	46,324	42,704	43,774	42,704	40,914	39,540
University of Texas at Arlington	41,376		40,999	41,515	42,733	42,863	42,496	41,712	39,706	37,008	34,868	33,329	33,267
Texas Tech University	40,127		40,528	39,451	39,574	38,250	37,845	37,010	36,225	35,546	34,843	32,797	32,611
Texas State University	44,630	40,678	38,722	38,171	37,864	37,812	38,644	38,644	38,666	38,849	37,979	36,739	35,546
University of Texas at San Antonio	38,223		34,344	34,177	34,402	32,389	32,101	30,680	28,959	28,787	28,628	28,623	30,607
University of Texas Rio Grande Valley	35,812		31,559	31,718	32,220	28,909	28,489	27,504	27,722	28,584			
University of Texas at Dallas	30,846		31,570	29,696	28,669	29,543	28,755	27,642	26,793	24,554	23,095	21,193	19,727
University of Texas at El Paso	24,351		23,880	24,003	24,867	25,144	25,063	25,020	23,888	23,308	23,043	22,926	22,728
Sam Houston State University			20,916	21,219	21,650	21,363	21,025	20,938	20,477	20,031	19,573	19,210	18,461
Lamar University	16,919		16,218	15,687	15,799	14,811	14,176	13,929	14,391	14,494	14,452	13,762	14,288
Texas Woman's University			15,443	15,828	16,032	15,710	15,364	15,321	15,511	15,146	14,889	14,899	14,898
University of Houston–Downtown			14,208	15,077	15,239	14,640	14,261	13,913	14,245	14,255	14,436	13,754	13,915
Tarleton State University			14,093	13,995	14,022	13,177	13,118	13,019	13,052	12,333	11,681	10,937	10,279
Stephen F. Austin State University			12,488	11,888	12,488	12,862	13,058	12,578	12,653	12,484	12,644	12,584	12,808
Texas A&M University–Commerce			10,754	10,966	11,624	11,725	12,072	12,490	12,385	12,302	11,490	11,068	11,187
Texas A&M University–Corpus Christi			10,778	10,762	10,820	11,452	11,929	12,236	12,202	11,661	11,234	10,913	10,508
Angelo State University				10,485	10,489	10,289	10,242	10,189	9,475	8,343	6,389	6,430	6,826
West Texas A&M University				9,545	10,051	9,970	10,030	10,060	9,901	9,482	8,970	8,381	7,909
University of Texas at Tyler				9,218	9,408	9,130	9,716	9,934	9,416	8,500	8,036	7,476	6,858
Prairie View A&M University				9,353	9,248	8,940	9,516	9,125	8,762	8,268	8,343	8,250	8,336
University of Houston–Clear Lake				9,279	9,053	9,082	8,961	8,542	8,669	8,906	8,665	8,164	8,153
Texas A&M International University				8,145	8,270	8,305	7,884	7,640	7,390	7,192	7,554	7,431	7,173
Texas Southern University				7,524	7,015	9,034	9,732	10,237	8,862	8,965	9,233	8,703	9,646
Texas A&M University–Kingsville				6,375	6,915	7,479	8,541	8,674	9,278	9,207	8,728	7,730	7,234
Texas A&M University–San Antonio				6,858	6,741	6,714	6,616	6,460	5,474	4,564	4,521	4,512	4,116
University of Texas Permian Basin				5,043	5,530	5,283	5,834	7,022	6,524	5,937	5,560	5,131	4,021
Midwestern State University				5,387	5,387	5,500	5,712	5,661	5,682	5,734	5,589	5,548	5,596
University of Houston–Victoria				4,198	4,931	4,499	4,381	4,351	4,144	4,152	4,407	4,491	4,335
University of North Texas at Dallas				4,186	4,164	4,040	3,757	3,509	3,030	2,488	2,575	2,140	2,100
Texas A&M University–Central Texas				2,218	2,339	2,440	2,464	2,575	2,619	2,466	2,316	2,404	2,253
Texas A&M University–Texarkana				2,078	2,161	2,053	2,067	2,038	1,993	1,839	1,812	1,805	1,903
Texas A&M University at Galveston				2,168	1,653	1,644	1,806	1,998	2,178	2,324	2,305	2,174	2,014
Sul Ross State University				1,485	1,557	1,644	1,885	1,996	2,071	1,973	1,897	1,889	1,780

== See also ==
- Education in Texas
- List of largest United States university campuses by enrollment
