= Texas Tech University Health Sciences Center El Paso =

Public university in El Paso, Texas, U.S.

Coordinates: 31.772°N 106.433°W

- Motto: From here, it's possible.
- Type: Public health sciences university
- Established: May 20, 2013; 13 years ago
- Parent institution: Texas Tech University System
- Accreditation: SACS
- Endowment: $167 million (FY2025) (TTUHSC EL Paso only) $3.35 billion (FY2025) (system-wide)
- Budget: $512 million (FY2026)
- Chancellor: Brandon Creighton
- President: Richard Lange
- Faculty: 312 (fall 2024)
- Administrative staff: 1,244 (fall 2024)
- Total staff: 1,556 (fall 2024)
- Students: 997 (fall 2024)
- Undergraduates: 242 (fall 2024)
- Postgraduates: 755 (fall 2024)
- Location: El Paso, Texas, United States
- Campus: Large city
- Website: ttuhscep.edu

Texas Tech University Health Sciences Center El Paso is a public university focused on the health sciences and located in El Paso, Texas, United States. It was founded in 1969 as a branch campus of the Texas Tech University Health Sciences Center and became a separate institution in 2013.

== History ==
TTUHSC El Paso opened in 1969 as the Regional Academic Health Center and became affiliated with R.E. Thomason Hospital in 1973 as part of TTUHSC in Lubbock, Texas.

The university now has approximately 1,675 faculty and staff members. For its first 35 years, only third- and fourth-year medical students, along with residents, could train in the campus' eight accredited programs. However, in February 2008, the school received full accreditation, allowing it to accept first- and second-year medical students into its postgraduate medical training. It was renamed the Paul L. Foster School of Medicine in 2009. Upon approval by the Texas Higher Education Coordinating Board and the Texas Board of Nursing, the Gayle Greve Hunt School of Nursing officially opened as a free-standing school of nursing in September 2011.

A feasibility study conducted in 2012 by the Texas Higher Education Coordinating Board determined that a proposed dental school, that would have been a college within TTUHSC El Paso, was too costly and at that time not necessary but may be necessitated in the future.

On May 20, 2013, Gov. Rick Perry signed a bill establishing the Texas Tech University Health Sciences Center El Paso as its own independent school within the Texas Tech University System. The signing of Senate Bill 120 gave the El Paso campus its own administration and took effect in 2015.

== Academics ==
Undergraduate demographics as of Fall 2023
Race and ethnicity	Total
Hispanic	88%
Black	4%
Unknown	3%
White	3%
American Indian/Alaska Native	1%
Two or more races	1%
Economic diversity
Low-income (Note: The percentage of students who received an income-based federal Pell grant intended for low-income students.)	51%
Affluent (Note: The percentage of students who are a part of the American middle class at the bare minimum.)	49%

=== Biomedical sciences ===
In 2012, the Lubbock campus expanded its Biomedical Sciences program to El Paso. The inaugural class in El Paso was admitted in the Spring of 2013. TTUHSC El Paso operates eleven community clinics throughout the city and County of El Paso. In addition to its partnership with Thomason Hospital, it has partnerships with William Beaumont Army Medical Center located on Fort Bliss and Providence Hospital.

=== Dental ===
The Woody L. Hunt School of Dental Medicine accepted its first class of students in June of 2021. It is headed by dean Richard Black since 2018.

=== Medicine ===
In 1998, TTUHSC El Paso celebrated 25 years serving the El Paso community. The following year, then-Texas Tech System Chancellor John T. Montford shared with the Board of Regents a vision for a full-fledged four-year medical school in El Paso to help alleviate a severe shortage of physicians in the area. Currently, there are less than 110 physicians for every 100,000 people in El Paso. The national average is 198 physicians per 100,000 patients. The Texas average is only 150 per 100,000. Studies have shown that most medical students remain in the region in which they received their education to establish their practices. The addition of the first two years of the medical school would allow students from El Paso and nearby regions to complete their education near home, in hopes of retaining doctors in the area.

In 2001, longtime community philanthropists J.O. and Marlene Stewart donated 10.2 acres of land near the HSC for the new medical campus. The Paso del Norte Foundation approved a $1.25 million scholarship grant program for local students contingent on the approval of the four-year medical school. During the 2001 Texas Legislative Session (77th), the El Paso legislative delegation secured $40 million in tuition revenue bonds for the research facility, one of three buildings on the new campus, just a short walk from the Texas Tech University Health Sciences Center—as well as an $11 million clinic expansion project that took about two years, and added a third floor on the present TTUHSC El Paso Medical Center building.

In 2002, the Paso del Norte Health Foundation announced a $1.25 million scholarship/grant loan program for TTUHSC El Paso students choosing to practice in El Paso.

In 2003, Texas Governor Rick Perry visited the El Paso campus for a ceremonial signing of House Bill 28, article 10, which authorized Texas Tech to issue $45 million in tuition revenue bonds for the construction of a classroom/office building for a four-year medical school at the El Paso campus. The governor also announced an additional $2 million in funding to finance start-up costs and faculty salaries. On December 9, 2003, the groundbreaking for El Paso Medical Science Building I took place, and two years later in January 2006, a ribbon-cutting followed. The 93,000 square-foot facility houses research on diabetes, cancer, environmental health and infectious diseases, as well as a repository dedicated to data on Hispanic health and a genomic facility to link hereditary diseases in families.

TTUHSC El Paso Regional Dean Jose Manuel de la Rosa was also appointed by President George W. Bush to the United States-Mexico Border Health Commission. The commission developed and coordinated actions to improve the health and quality of life along the United States-Mexico border and studied ways to solve the border's health problems.

=== Nursing ===
The Gayle Greve Hunt School of Nursing (GGHSON) was officially opened as a free-standing school of nursing on September 1, 2011. The School was launched through the generous donation of $10 million by the Hunt Family Foundation, and in April 2011, received initial approval from the Texas Higher Education Coordinating Board and the Texas Board of Nursing. The Commission on Collegiate Nursing Education's Board of Commissioners acted at its meeting in April, 2013 to grant accreditation to the baccalaureate degree program in nursing for five years, extending to June, 2018. The accreditation action was effective as of September 12, 2012. The program met all four accreditation standards and determined that there were no compliance concerns with respect to the key elements. The GGHSON is on the U.S./Mexico border. The current enrollment is 85% Hispanic, with a total of 103 students.

== Campus ==
The university is currently building three new buildings and has completed another building for the projected 2009 opening of the full 4-year medical school. This will be the first four-year medical school on the U.S./Mexico border and is expected to improve the local economy by US $1.31-billion by the year 2013. TTUHSC El Paso will also fill a niche in border and Hispanic health by leading research that will have a huge impact on the nation by contributing to literature dealing with Hispanics and diseases that affect the El Paso area—diabetes, obesity, and depression.

In 2005 TTUHSC El Paso launched the Infinity Campaign, seeking to raise $25-million of private funds towards the building of the four-year medical school in El Paso. On August 4, 2007, Paul Foster, President and CEO of Western Refining, made a $50-million donation to the school. This is the largest donation in the history of the Texas Tech University System. The Infinity Campaign concluded on May 27, 2008. Including the Foster contribution, it netted $83-million, $58-million above its goal. When the medical school opened at the Health Sciences Center in 2009, it was the first health school to open in the U.S. in 30 years.

== Presidents ==
- Tedd Mitchell, M.D. (Interim): May 20, 2013 – June 30, 2014
- Richard A. Lange, M.D., M.B.A.: July 1, 2014 – present
