= Laura W. Bush Institute for Women's Health =

- Established: August 2007
- Research type: Women's health
- Director: Connie Tyne
- Location: Abilene; Amarillo; Dallas; Lubbock; Permian Basin; San Angelo
- Operating agency: Texas Tech University Health Sciences Center
- Website: http://www.laurabushinstitute.org

The Laura W. Bush Institute for Women's Health within the Texas Tech University Health Sciences Center was established in 2007 to promote research specific to women's health, to provide advanced sex and gender specific education to health care professionals, and to enrich the lives of women and girls through community programs and cancer prevention.

In ten years, more than 60,000 women and girls have been served through inspiring programs, resources, vaccines, and cancer screenings.

== Research ==
Over a period of 8 years, the Laura W. Bush Institute provided scientists over $2.5 million for groundbreaking research unique to women’s health. They award grants to faculty and students within Texas Tech University Health Sciences Center schools of Health Professions, Medicine, Nursing, Pharmacy, and Biomedical Sciences; as well as Angelo State University College of Health and Human Services. Understanding that scientific research on women lags far behind men, they expect this new data to lead to more accurate diagnosis and treatments for women.

== Education ==
As new information regarding women’s health is published, online curriculum translate science into practice by updating students and practitioners with new data regarding sex and gender differences that are not common knowledge. At their website sexandgenderhealth.org the Laura W. Bush Institute’s slide library, teaching modules, and video library are tailored to health care professors to assist in teaching sex and gender differences across many diseases.

== Community impact ==
The Laura W. Bush Institute for Women’s Health hosts one signature fundraising event in these Texas cities each year: Abilene, Amarillo, Dallas, Lubbock, Permian Basin, and San Angelo. By 2018, over $4 million had fueled programs for each city. For middle school girls there are messages of personal safety, anti-bullying, good nutrition, friendship and self-care through events called GiRL Power. For college women, there are messages of self-defense, healthy relationships, self-determination, and mental and physical health at Girls Night Out and Women’s Night at the Rec. The Institute hosts coffees and luncheons for women that provide updates on cancer, heart disease, stem cells, mental health and many other topics.

Multi-year Cancer Prevention and Research Institute of Texas (CPRIT) grants have provided over $7.5 million and directly affected more than 25,000 women with education and screenings. By 2018, the Institute facilitated 8,000 mammograms and diagnostic services, which diagnosed 132 cancers and provided approximately 6,500 HPV vaccinations.

The Laura W. Bush Institute for Women’s Health has become an integral part of the cities served, all of which have Texas Tech University Health Sciences Center medical, nursing, pharmacy, or biomedical science schools. It serves the uninsured and the underinsured in many rural communities that have limited resources.

The Texas Tech University Health Sciences Center supports approximately eighty percent of expenses to allow the majority of funds raised to be directed to the Institute's mission.

== Leadership ==
- Executive Director — Connie Tyne
- Chief Scientific Officer — Marjorie Jenkins, MD
- Co-Director of Curriculum — Cynthia Jumper, MD
- Co-Director of Curriculum — Simon Williams, PhD
