= University Medical Center (Lubbock, Texas) =

Coordinates: 33°35′17.95″N 101°53′28.91″W

- UMC Health System

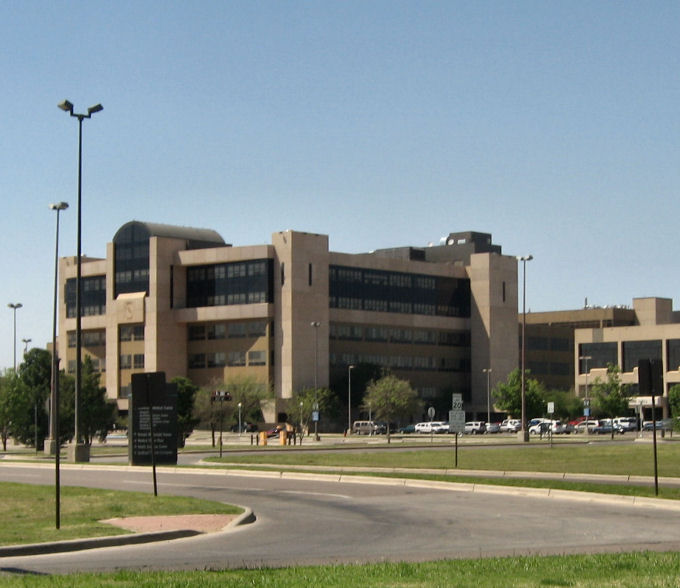

Geography
- Location: 602 Indiana Ave. Lubbock, Texas, United States

Organization
- Care system: Public
- Type: General and teaching
- Affiliated university: Texas Tech University Health Sciences Center (TTUHSC)

Services
- Emergency department: Level I trauma center
- Beds: 500

Helipads
- Helipad: FAA LID: TA79

History
- Founded: 1978

Links
- Website: www.umchealthsystem.com
- Lists: Hospitals in Texas

University Medical Center (UMC) is a public, nonprofit, 500-bed academic medical center located in Lubbock, Texas. As the primary hospital of UMC Health System, UMC is owned by the taxpayers of Lubbock County and governed locally. The hospital provides healthcare services to patients throughout West Texas and Eastern New Mexico, serving a region that spans approximately 260,000 square miles.

UMC serves as the primary teaching hospital for Texas Tech University Health Sciences Center (TTUHSC), supporting medical education, clinical training and the development of the region's healthcare workforce.

In December 2023, UMC expanded its services with the opening of UMC Health & Wellness Hospital in southwest Lubbock. The second hospital campus provides emergency care, outpatient surgery, advanced imaging, rehabilitation, infusion services and physician clinics, expanding access to healthcare in a growing area of Lubbock County.

UMC is home to the John A. Griswold Trauma Center, the first and only Level I Trauma Center in West Texas, and the Timothy J. Harnar Burn Center, the region's only verified burn center. UMC was also the first hospital in West Texas to achieve Magnet recognition for nursing excellence.

As part of its commitment to expanding access to healthcare, UMC provides emergency, specialty and pediatric services to communities throughout the region. UMC Children's Hospital is affiliated with Children's Miracle Network Hospitals and provides specialized pediatric care, including pediatric and neonatal intensive care services.

Through its partnership with UMC Physicians (UMCP), the health system provides primary care, pediatric care, urgent care and specialty services at more than 30 clinic locations throughout Lubbock and surrounding communities, including Wolfforth, Slaton, Idalou and Post.

Lubbock's 911 Emergency Medical Services (EMS) are provided by University Medical Center (UMC), which fully funds and operates the service. UMC EMS responds to more than 31,000 emergency calls annually through a priority dispatch system, providing emergency medical response to the Lubbock community.
