= Texas Tech University Health Sciences Center at Dallas =

Coordinates: 32.8207°N 96.8414°W

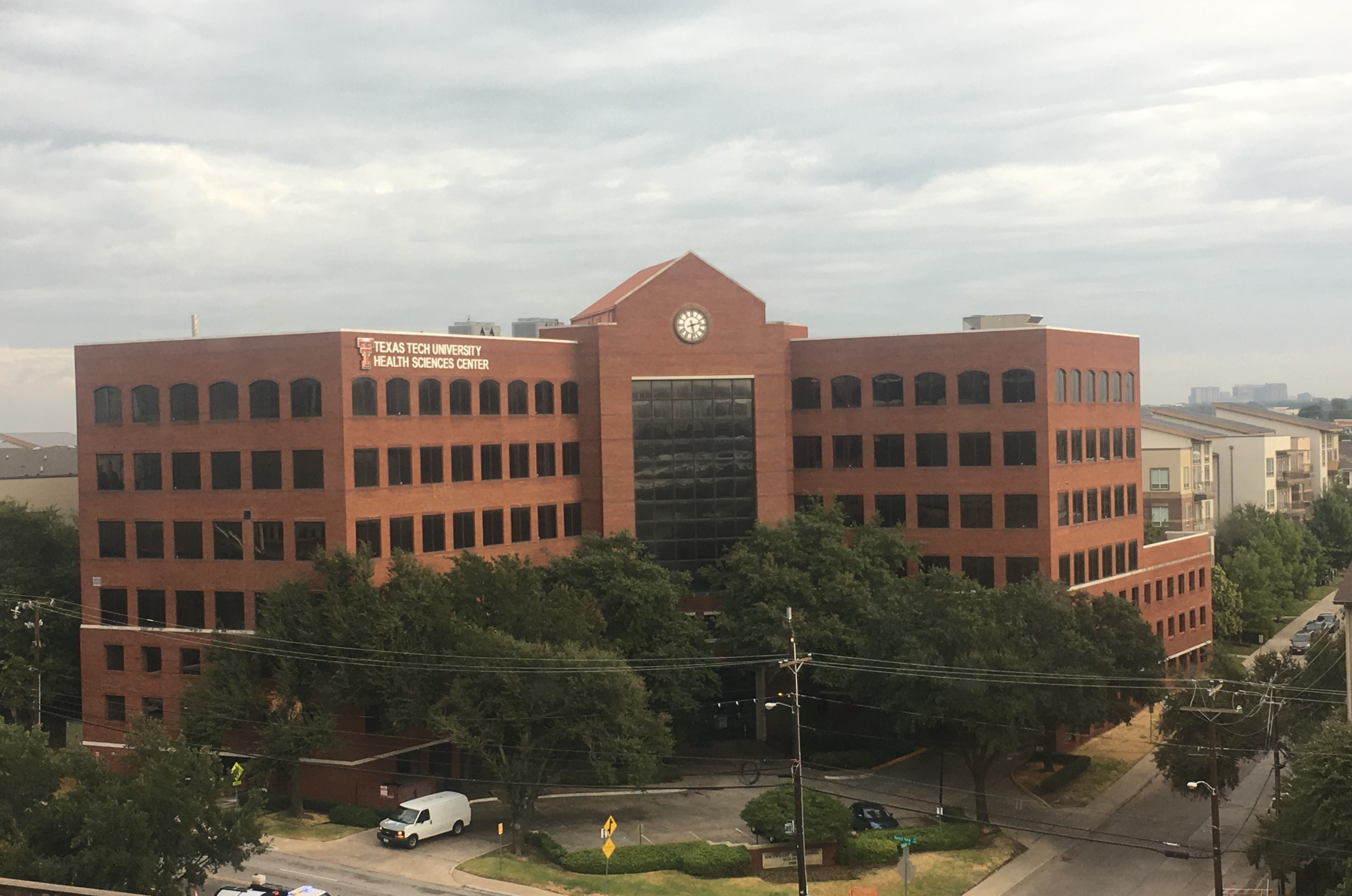

Texas Tech University Health Sciences Center at Dallas (TTUHSC Dallas) is a branch campus of Texas Tech University Health Sciences Center (TTUHSC) located in Dallas, Texas.

The TTUHSC School of Pharmacy and the School of Nursing are the only academic units to offer classes at the campus. TTUHSC Dallas is located adjacent to the Southwestern Medical District in Dallas, that includes institutions such as Children's Medical Center Dallas, Parkland Memorial Hospital, and the University of Texas Southwestern Medical Center.
