= Steven L. Berk =

American physician and writer

- Born: Steven Lee Berk; March 12, 1949; New York, U.S.
- Died: May 26, 2023 (aged 74)
- Education: Brandeis University; Boston University School of Medicine
- Occupations: Physician, writer
- Spouse: Shirley Anne Holtsclaw (m. 1981)

Steven Lee Berk (March 12, 1949 – May 26, 2023) was an American physician and writer.

== Life and career ==
Berk was born in New York, the son of Sidney Berk and Freida Blank. He attended Brandeis University, graduating in 1971. He also attended Boston University School of Medicine, graduating in 1975. After graduating, he completed his medical and infectious disease training at Boston City Hospital. In 1979, he helped establish the James H. Quillen College of Medicine at East Tennessee State University.

Berk served as a professor in the department of medicine at Texas Tech University Health Sciences Center from 1999 to 2023. During his years as a professor, in 2001, he was named the Mirick-Myers Endowed Chair Professor in Geriatric Medicine, in 2011, he wrote the book Anatomy of a Kidnapping: A Doctor's Story, writing about his experiences as a victim of kidnapping, and in 2020, he was named the Grover E. Murray Professor by the Texas Tech University System Board of Regents.

== Personal life and death ==
In 1981, Berk married Shirley Anne Holtsclaw. Their marriage lasted until Berk's death in 2026.

Berk died on May 26, 2023, at the age of 74.
