= Texas Tech University Health Sciences Center at Abilene =

- Motto: Your Life, Our Purpose
- Type: State university Branch campus
- Established: 2007
- Parent institution: Texas Tech University Health Sciences Center
- Location: Abilene, Texas, United States; 32.4688°N 99.7322°W
- Website: www.ttuhsc.edu/campus/abilene/

Texas Tech University Health Sciences Center at Abilene (TTUHSC Abilene) is a branch campus of Texas Tech University Health Sciences Center (TTUHSC) located in Abilene, Texas. The campus has a school of pharmacy and a school of nursing.

The School of Pharmacy opened on August 12, 2007. Classes are held in a Spanish-themed 36,000-square-foot (3,300 m^{2}) building, constructed at a cost of US$15.5 million. The initial enrollment of 40 grew to 160 by fall of 2011. As of 2012, the school had 19 faculty members. The Julia Jones Matthews Department of Public Health is based out of the TTUHSC Abilene campus.
