= Texas Tech University Health Sciences Center at Amarillo =

Healthcare organization in Amarillo, United States

Coordinates: 35°12′2″N 101°55′28″W

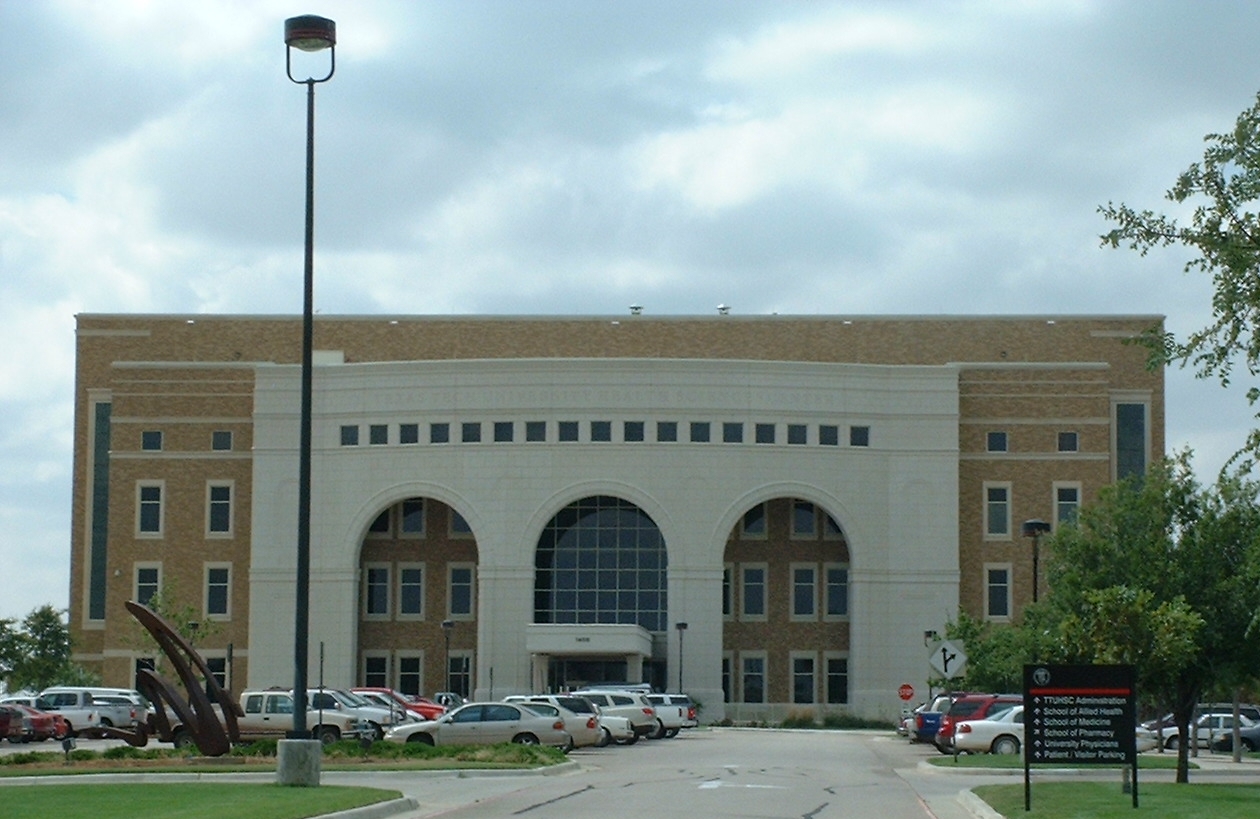
- Motto: From here, it's possible.
- Type: State university
- Established: 1972
- Chancellor: Dr. Tedd Mitchell
- Location: Amarillo, Texas, U.S.
- Campus: Urban
- Website: http://www.ttuhsc.edu/amarillo/

Texas Tech University Health Sciences Center at Amarillo (TTUHSC Amarillo) is a branch campus of Texas Tech University Health Sciences Center (TTUHSC) located in Amarillo, Texas.

The university exists in two locations in Amarillo: one housing the Laura W. Bush Institute for Women's Health and the Harrington Library of the Health Sciences, and the other housing the schools, clinics, and research facilities. The campus has been at its current location since 2002.

The TTUHSC Amarillo serves as a regional campus to the School of Allied Health Sciences and the School of Medicine.

Unlike the other TTUHSC schools, the Amarillo campus, rather than the Lubbock campus, serves as the main campus for the School of Pharmacy.
