= Texas Tech University Health Sciences Center =

Public health sciences university in Lubbock, Texas, US

- Motto: Your Life, Our Purpose.
- Type: Public health sciences university
- Established: May 27, 1969; 57 years ago
- Parent institution: Texas Tech University System
- Accreditation: SACS
- Endowment: $335 million (FY2025) (TTUHSC only) $3.35 billion (FY2025) (system-wide)
- Budget: $1.08 billion (FY2026)
- Chancellor: Brandon Creighton
- President: Lori Rice-Spearman
- Academic staff: 765 (fall 2024)
- Total staff: 4,783 (fall 2024)
- Students: 5,114 (fall 2024)
- Location: Lubbock, Texas, United States; 33.590°N 101.892°W
- Campus: Urban
- Colors: Scarlet and black
- Website: www.ttuhsc.edu

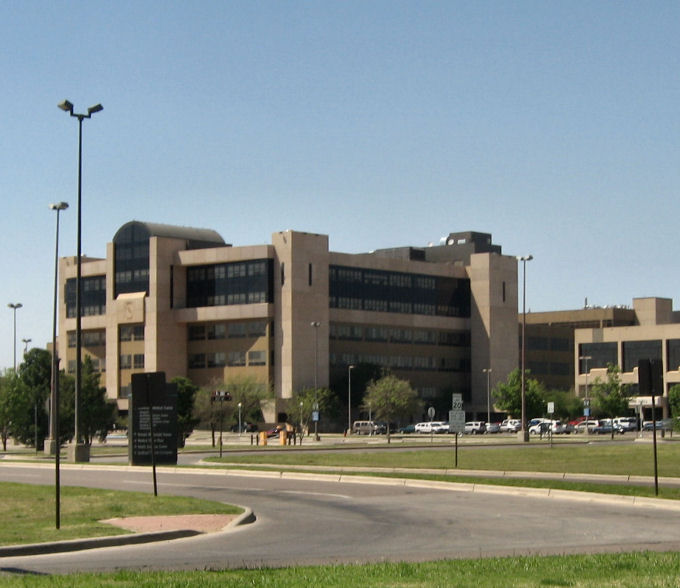
University Medical Center, the teaching hospital of Texas Tech University Health Sciences Center in Lubbock

The Texas Tech University Health Sciences Center (TTUHSC) is a public medical school based in Lubbock, Texas, United States, with additional campuses in Abilene, Amarillo, Dallas, and the Permian Basin. TTUHSC serves more than 100 counties in the western portion of Texas. The university is a separate institution from Texas Tech University; both universities are among five universities that are part of the Texas Tech University System. Texas Tech University Health Sciences Center El Paso, founded in 1969 as a branch campus of TTUHSC, became a separate institution in 2013.

== Schools ==
Undergraduate demographics as of Fall 2023
Race and ethnicity	Total
White	50%
Hispanic	33%
Black	9%
Asian	6%
American Indian/Alaska Native	1%
Unknown	1%
Economic diversity
Low-income (Note: The percentage of students who received an income-based federal Pell grant intended for low-income students.)	19%
Affluent (Note: The percentage of students who are a part of the American middle class at the bare minimum.)	81%

=== Graduate School of Biomedical Sciences ===
The Graduate School of Biomedical Sciences (GSBS) has campuses in Lubbock, Abilene, and Amarillo. The school offers doctoral and master's degrees in biomedical sciences, as well as professional certificates and dual degrees in collaboration with the School of Medicine.

=== School of Health Professions ===
The school began in 1983 as the School of Allied Health Sciences and currently has campuses in Amarillo, Lubbock, and the Permian Basin. More than 1,800 students are currently enrolled in 20 different degree programs at the doctoral, master's and baccalaureate degree levels. These programs include areas of study, such as athletic training, audiology, clinical management, medical laboratory science, molecular pathology, physical and occupational therapy, physician assistant, rehabilitation, and speech-language pathology.

=== School of Medicine ===
The Texas Tech University Health Sciences Center School of Medicine in Lubbock has awarded more than 3,000 Doctor of Medicine degrees since its first graduating class in 1974. The school was commissioned to train physicians to help meet the health care needs of residents of West Texas, a population that now includes more than 2.5 million people. When the school opened, West Texas had one physician for every 1,300 residents. Currently, the ratio is about one physician for every 750 residents. Students spend their first two years of study in Lubbock and their last two years studying in Amarillo, Odessa or Lubbock. A self-proclaimed major initiative for the school is to "recruit creative, innovative research faculty and to develop graduate students and postdoctoral fellows for lifelong careers in medical research."

=== School of Nursing ===
The school has campuses in Abilene, Amarillo, Lubbock, Dallas, and Odessa, with additional learning sites in Mansfield, San Antonio, and Austin; and it educates more than 1,000 students each year. Bachelor's, master's, and doctoral degrees in nursing are issued by the school. The School of Nursing offers the only Doctor of Nursing Practice program in West Texas. The school is known for its alternatives to traditional educational opportunities including online coursework for a registered nurse to obtain a Bachelor of Science in Nursing, a second-degree Bachelor of Science in Nursing program for students with a bachelor's degree in another subject, and a Veteran to Bachelor of Science in Nursing degree for veterans with military medical experience who wish to earn a nursing degree but already have considerable knowledge that distinguishes them from a traditional nursing student.

=== School of Pharmacy ===
The School of Pharmacy's administrative hub is located in Amarillo and the school has regional campus sites in Lubbock, Dallas and Abilene. The school has two Dallas-area regional sites: one located on the grounds of the North Texas Veterans Administration Medical Center and the second located within the central Dallas medical district.

Lubbock faculty and residents also operate the TTUHSC Pharmacy, which provides medications and biologicals to the Texas Department of Criminal Justice Montford Unit Regional Medical Facility; the TTUHSC International Pain Institute; the Garrison Geriatric Education and Care Center; and TTUHSC clinics in Lubbock, Odessa and El Paso. The TTUHSC Pharmacy also provides telepharmacy services to the rural communities of Turkey and Earth, Texas. The first telepharmacy prescription dispensed in Texas occurred September 18, 2002, between the TTUHSC Pharmacy and the Turkey Medical Clinic.

- Department of Pharmacy Practice
- Department of Pharmaceutical Sciences
- Department of Immunotherapeutics and Biotechnology

=== Julia Jones Matthews School of Population and Public Health ===
The Julia Jones Matthews School of Population and Public Health is located on the Abilene and Lubbock campuses.

== Campuses ==
Campus	Established	Enrollment by School (fall 2024)						
Campus	Established	Biomedical Sciences	Health Professions	Medicine	Nursing	Pharmacy	Public Health	Total
Abilene	2007	18	—	—	227	79	—	324
Amarillo	1972	22	48	105	59	79	—	313
Dallas	1999	—	—	—	—	232	—	232
Distance Education	1999	—	1,001	—	1,183	9	108	2,301
Lubbock; Flagship Campus	1969	107	636	572	318	13	3	1,649
Permian Basin (Midland, Odessa)	1979	—	186	58	51	—	—	295
Total Students		147	1,871	735	1,838	412	111	5,114

== Institutes and centers ==
- F. Marie Hall Institute for Rural and Community Health
- Garrison Institute on Aging (GIA)
- The Institute of Environmental and Human Health (TIEHH)
- Laura W. Bush Institute for Women's Health (LWBIWH)
- Center of Excellence for Geriatric Scholarship, Training, and Faculty Development
- Center of Excellence in Evidence-Based Practice (CEEBP)
- Center for Innovation in Nursing Education (CINE)
- Center for International and Multicultural Affairs (CIMA)
- Center for Membrane Protein Research
- Center for Rehabilitation Research
- Pediatric Pharmacology Research and Development Center
- School of Medicine Cancer Center
- School of Pharmacy Cancer Biology Center (CBC)
- South Plains Alcohol and Addiction Research Center (SPAARC)
- University Medical Center Southwest Cancer Treatment Center
- Vascular Drug Research Center
- West Texas Influenza Center

== Objectives ==
The presence of TTUHSC has impacted the access to health care in West Texas. Over 20% of the physicians currently practicing in West Texas are TTUHSC medical school or residency graduates. The schools of Nursing and Health Professions impact West Texas, with most of their graduates remaining in West Texas to pursue their chosen profession. Over 80% of School of Pharmacy graduates have chosen to practice in Texas.

== Traditions ==
=== White Coat ceremony ===
Usually held in August, a new group of first-year medical students participate in the White Coat Ceremony each year. This event is a rite of passage for first-year medical students as they don their coats and take a Hippocratic oath affirming their commitment to the highest standards of ethics and patient care. At the TTUHSC School of Medicine in Lubbock, the ceremony is held at the Lubbock Memorial Civic Center.

== People ==
=== Alumni ===
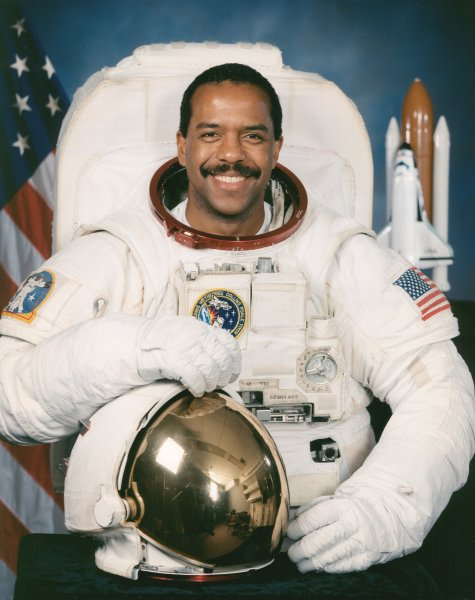
NASA astronaut Bernard A. Harris Jr.

- Donna Campbell, member of the Texas Senate, is an emergency room physician from New Braunfels. She graduated from Texas Tech with her M.D. in 1989.
- Bernard A. Harris Jr. graduated from the SOM in 1982 before becoming an astronaut with NASA and has spent more than 400 hours in space.

=== Faculty ===
- Steven L. Berk
- Bernard T. Mittemeyer
- Tom Shires
- Amy Doneen, DNP
- Ted W. Reid, professor of Ophthalmology & Visual Sciences.

=== Presidents ===
- David R. Smith (1996 – Sept 2001)
- M. Roy Wilson (Jun 2003 – Jun 2006
- Bernhard T. Mittemeyer [(interim) Jul 2006–]
- John C. Baldwin (Jul 2007 – Sept 2009)
- Tedd L. Mitchell (May 2010–2019)
- Lori Rice-Spearman (2020–present)
