= Paul Campbell (American football) =

American football player (1926–2005)

Profile
- Position: QB
- Class: 1950

Personal information
- Born: March 11, 1926; Olney, Texas, U.S.
- Died: February 10, 2005 (aged 78); Midland, Texas, U.S.
- Listed height: 6 ft 0 in (1.83 m)
- Listed weight: 175 lb (79 kg)

Career information
- High school: Breckenridge High School
- College: Texas

Awards and highlights
- 1948 Sugar Bowl Champion; 1949 Orange Bowl Champion

Paul Edward Campbell (March 11, 1926 – February 10, 2005) was a college athlete who was the starting quarterback for the Texas Longhorns football team in 1948 and 1949. He was the 22nd pick overall in the 1948 NFL draft, selected by the Philadelphia Eagles.

== Early life ==
Campbell was born in Olney, Texas, but shortly thereafter moved to Breckenridge, Texas, where he was an all-district fullback and kicker on the high school football team as well as playing tennis and basketball. He was originally playing in the school band, but after showing talent in a physical education class, his coach Eck Curtis asked him to switch to football. He alternated between halfback and fullback, though occasionally threw the ball, including a game-tying touchdown pass in his last game against Waco in the 1943 Texas 2A state playoffs (they lost the game on the penetrations tiebreaker). The previous year, Campbell and Breckenridge made it all the way to the state semi-finals before losing to eventual state champion Austin.

== College football ==
Campbell first enrolled at Texas A&M in February 1944, where he played tennis and basketball, but left after one semester to serve in the U.S. Army Air Corps during World War II.

That summer, stationed at South Plains Army Air Field he was selected to play for the Service All-Stars football team. Campbell was again coached by Curtis, who now utilized the newly popular T formation. The All-Stars played an exhibition game against the NFL's Brooklyn Tigers, at their training camp in Abilene. Though the All-Stars lost, Campbell played quarterback for the first time, and his two touchdown passes drew the attention of NFL scouts. He continued to play quarterback and tailback for the base's football team, the Winged Commandos, which played games against other service teams and college teams such as Texas Tech, North Texas Agricultural College and TCU.

When Campbell was discharged from the service in 1946, he decided not to return to A&M and instead attended Rice, but while in Houston he took a weekend trip to Austin, where he ran into Curtis, who had just been hired as an assistant coach at Texas. Campbell immediately enrolled at Texas, where his experience running the t-formation made him a valuable player. Because he had played tennis and basketball at Texas A&M, and because A&M refused to waive their claims to him, Campbell was ineligible to play those sports at Texas.

In his first season at Texas in 1946, Campbell played in only a few games. He intercepted a pass against Missouri and went 4–5 against Colorado for 145 yards.

In 1947, Campbell competed with future Hall of Fame coach Tom Landry to be the back-up quarterback to another future NFL Hall of Famer, Bobby Layne. Landry broke his thumb three weeks into the season, making it impossible for him to take snaps and as a result was moved to fullback. The team went 10–1, missing out on a perfect record due to a one-point loss to #8 SMU, and won the 1948 Sugar Bowl.

In December 1947, Campbell was drafted 22nd overall by the Philadelphia Eagles in the third round of the 1948 NFL draft (22nd overall) based largely on his service play. Layne was drafted by the Chicago Bears that same year.

Campbell chose not to play professional football and instead competed for the starting role in 1948, and that year, with Layne graduated and Landry at fullback, Campbell became the team's starter. Texas, under second year coach Blair Cherry, was projected to win the Southwest Conference in 1949 and started the season ranked #16. It took Campbell several games to develop as a consistent passer and the team suffered early losses to #2 North Carolina, Oklahoma and then to eventual conference champion SMU. Campbell played better as he gained more experience, including a game-winning pass against Baylor, but the team finished a disappointing 6–3–1, including a tie to Texas A&M whom they were expected to beat. The Longhorns earned a surprise invitation to the 1949 Orange Bowl against one-loss and #8 ranked Georgia, where they pulled off an upset 41–28 win behind Landry's 107 yards rushing and Campbell's 66 yards passing and a touchdown.

In 1949, Campbell was again the starting quarterback for Texas. Though Texas posted a disappointing 6–4 record, finishing unranked and without a bowl game invitation, Campbell had a stellar season. He set the school record for most yards passing in a single game in a 27–14 defeat of Arkansas that took Texas to the #10 ranking; and set the record for most passing yards in a single season. He led Texas to a 20–0 upset of #6 Baylor. But the Longhorns lost all the close ones, dropping games to #9 Rice by two points, #11 SMU and unranked TCU by one point and #3 Oklahoma by six. Campbell earned 2nd Team All-Southwest Conference recognition and was invited to the 1950 Senior Bowl.

Campbell finished his career at Texas with a 13–7–1 record and with the second most career passing yards in school history, behind only Layne, a position he would hold until the early 1980s. He led the team in offense in both 1948 and 1949.

To cap off his college career, Campbell was the quarterback for the North team in the inaugural Senior Bowl. Campbell completed the most passes in the game, even more than MVP Travis Tidwell, going 18 of 37 for 147 yards, but it was not enough as the Yanks lost, 22–13. After the game, it was announced that three Southwest Conference schools, including Texas, would immediately cut off financial support to participants in the game because they accepted the $343 cash reward for playing. Though all of the players, including Doak Walker, had completed their eligibility, they were continuing to receive scholarships through the spring 1950 semester.

=== Records ===
- UT – Most Passing Yards, game (257), surpassed by Rick McIvor in 1979
- UT – Most Passing Yards, season (1372), surpassed by Robert Brewer in 1982

== Professional football ==
In May 1950, Campbell was signed by the Eagles and went to training camp, and that summer he participated in the Chicago College All-Star Game, which the defending NFL Champion Eagles surprisingly lost. By the start of the 1950 season he'd been cut, and was hired by the Paterson Panthers of the American Association. He played well, but the team went 4–4 and was forced to disband due to a financial dispute with one game remaining on the schedule. The league disbanded at the end of the year.

== Later life ==
In January 1947, Campbell married his high school sweetheart, Doris Gracey and together they had four sons. In 1955, they moved to Odessa, Texas, where he worked as a salesman in the oil business. Campbell became a competitive golfer, becoming champion of the Odessa Country Club three times and entering several other local tournaments. He was divorced in 1995 in Odessa, died Thursday, February 10, 2005, at Midland Memorial Hospital in Midland, Texas and was buried in Odessa.
