= Abilene Christian Wildcats =

Sports teams of Abilene Christian University in Texas, US

- University: Abilene Christian University
- Nickname: Wildcats
- NCAA: Division I (FCS)
- Conference: UAC (primary)
- Athletic director: Zack Lassiter
- Location: Abilene, Texas
- Varsity teams: 16
- Football stadium: Anthony Field at Wildcat Stadium
- Arena: Moody Coliseum
- Baseball stadium: Crutcher Scott Field
- Softball stadium: Poly Wells Field
- Soccer stadium: Elmer Gray Stadium
- Colors: Purple and white
- Mascot: Willie, the Wildcat
- Fight song: ACU Fight Song
- Website: acusports.com
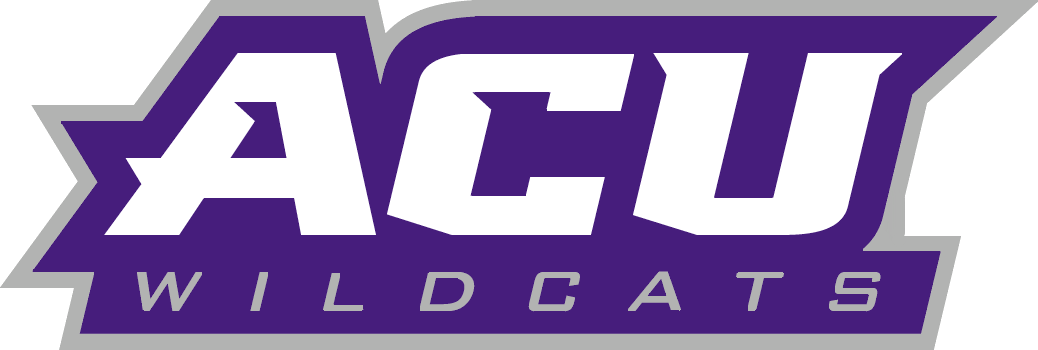

Abilene Christian Wildcats (variously ACU or ACU Wildcats) refers to the sports teams of Abilene Christian University located in Abilene, Texas. The Wildcats have been members of the United Athletic Conference (UAC) since 2021, when that conference was known as the Western Athletic Conference (WAC). Before joining the WAC/UAC, the Wildcats had spent the previous eight years in the Southland Conference. The nickname "Wildcat" is derived from the mascot of the team.

== History ==
A member of the United Athletic Conference, Abilene Christian sponsors teams in seven men's and eight women's NCAA sanctioned sports.

On December 6, 1923, Abilene Christian applied for admission to Texas Intercollegiate Athletic Association during the conference annual meeting in Dallas. The Wildcats had been considering joining the conference for several years but funding for the athletic department preventing them to join the conference sooner.

On July 1, 2013, Abilene Christian returned to the Southland Conference as one of four new members. The university, a charter member of the Southland Conference, left the Southland in 1973 to join the Lone Star Conference (LSC) of NCAA Division II. The Wildcats remained members of the Lone Star Conference from 1973 until returning to the Southland Conference in 2013.

Overall, the Wildcats have won a combined 62 team national championships, including 57 as a member of the NCAA trailing behind UCLA, Stanford, USC and Kenyon College for the most NCAA team championships.

In 2007, the LSC included 33 ACU current and former student athletes in its 75-member all-sports team commemorating the conference's 75th anniversary.

On August 23, 2017, the NCAA Board of Directors voted to pass ACU through to full Division I status, thus making them eligible for postseason play.

On January 14, 2021, ACU was one of five institutions announced as future members of the Western Athletic Conference (WAC), alongside three other Southland members from Texas (Lamar, Sam Houston, Stephen F. Austin) plus Big Sky Conference member Southern Utah. Initially, all five schools were to join in July 2022, but the entry of ACU and the other Texas schools was moved to 2021 after the Southland expelled its departing members.

ACU football competed in a football-only partnership between the WAC and the Atlantic Sun Conference in the 2021 and 2022 seasons. After the 2022 season, the conferences fully merged their football leagues, creating what eventually became the football-only version of the United Athletic Conference. After the 2025–26 school year, the football-only UAC was merged into the WAC, which adopted the United Athletic Conference name with ACU as a continuing member.

=== Conference affiliation history ===
- 1924–25 to 1932–33 – Texas Intercollegiate Athletic Association
- 1933–34 to 1952–53 – Texas Conference
- 1953–54 – Independent
- 1954–55 to 1956–57 – Gulf Coast Conference
- 1957–58 to 1962–63 – Independent
- 1963–64 to 1972–73 – Southland Conference
- 1973–74 to 2012–13 – Lone Star Conference
- 2013–14 to 2020–21 – Southland Conference
- 2021 to Present – United Athletic Conference (Western Athletic Conference before 2026)

== Sports sponsored ==
Men's sports	Women's sports
Baseball	Basketball
Basketball	Beach volleyball
Cross country	Cross country
Football	Soccer
Golf	Softball
Tennis	Tennis
Track and field^{†}	Track and field^{†}
	Volleyball
† – Track and field includes both indoor and outdoor

The Wildcats sponsor 15 varsity sports - 7 men's and 8 women's. The men's teams include Baseball, Basketball, Cross Country, Football, Golf, Tennis, and Track & Field. The women's teams include Basketball, Cross Country, Golf, Soccer, Softball, Tennis, Track & Field, and Volleyball.

== Athletics facilities ==
Venue	Sport	Opened
Wildcat Stadium	Football	2017
Moody Coliseum	Basketball; Volleyball	1968
Poly Wells Field	Softball	1997
Crutcher Scott Field	Baseball	1991
Elmer Gray Stadium	Soccer	2015

=== Gallery ===
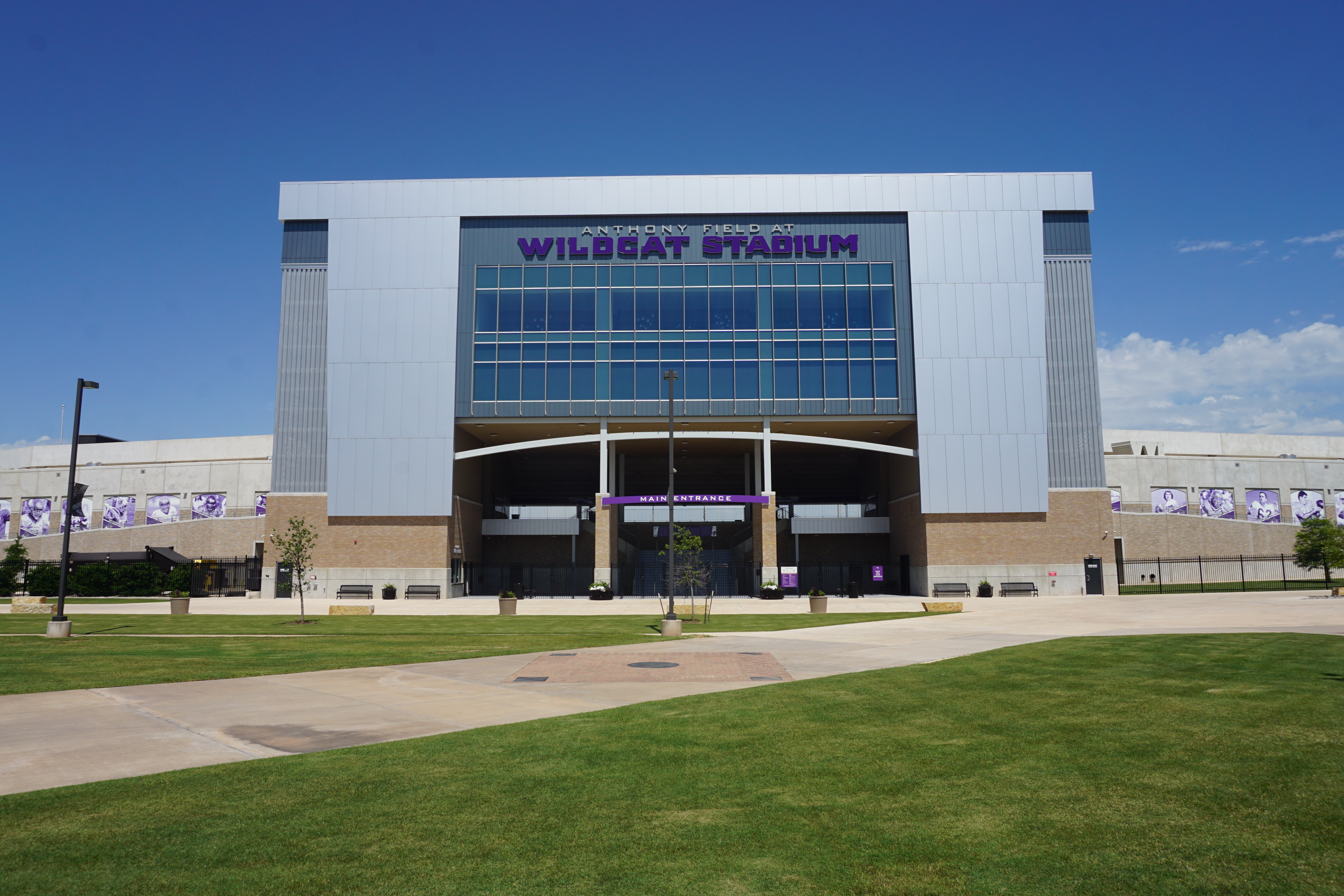
Wildcat Stadium

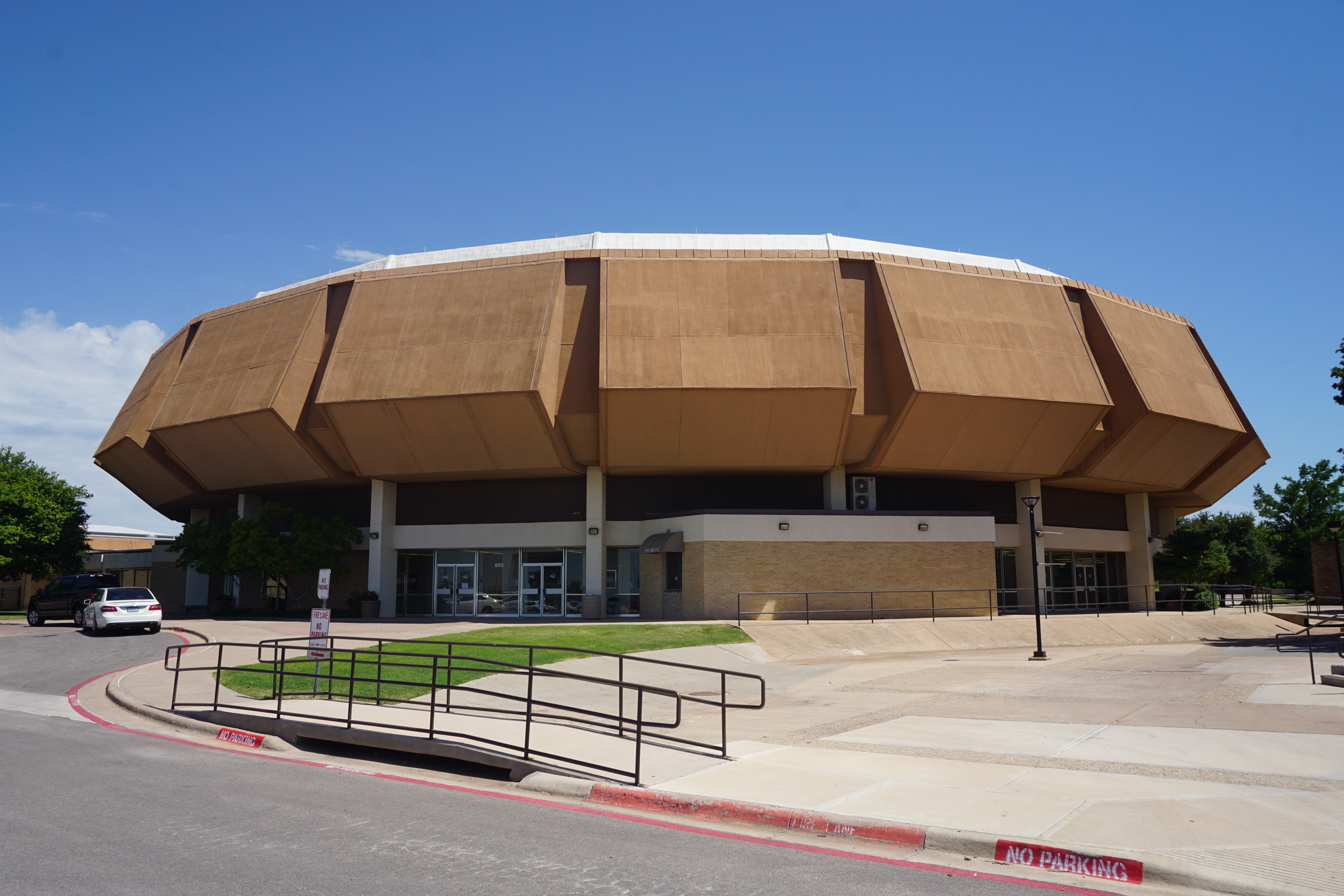
Moody Coliseum

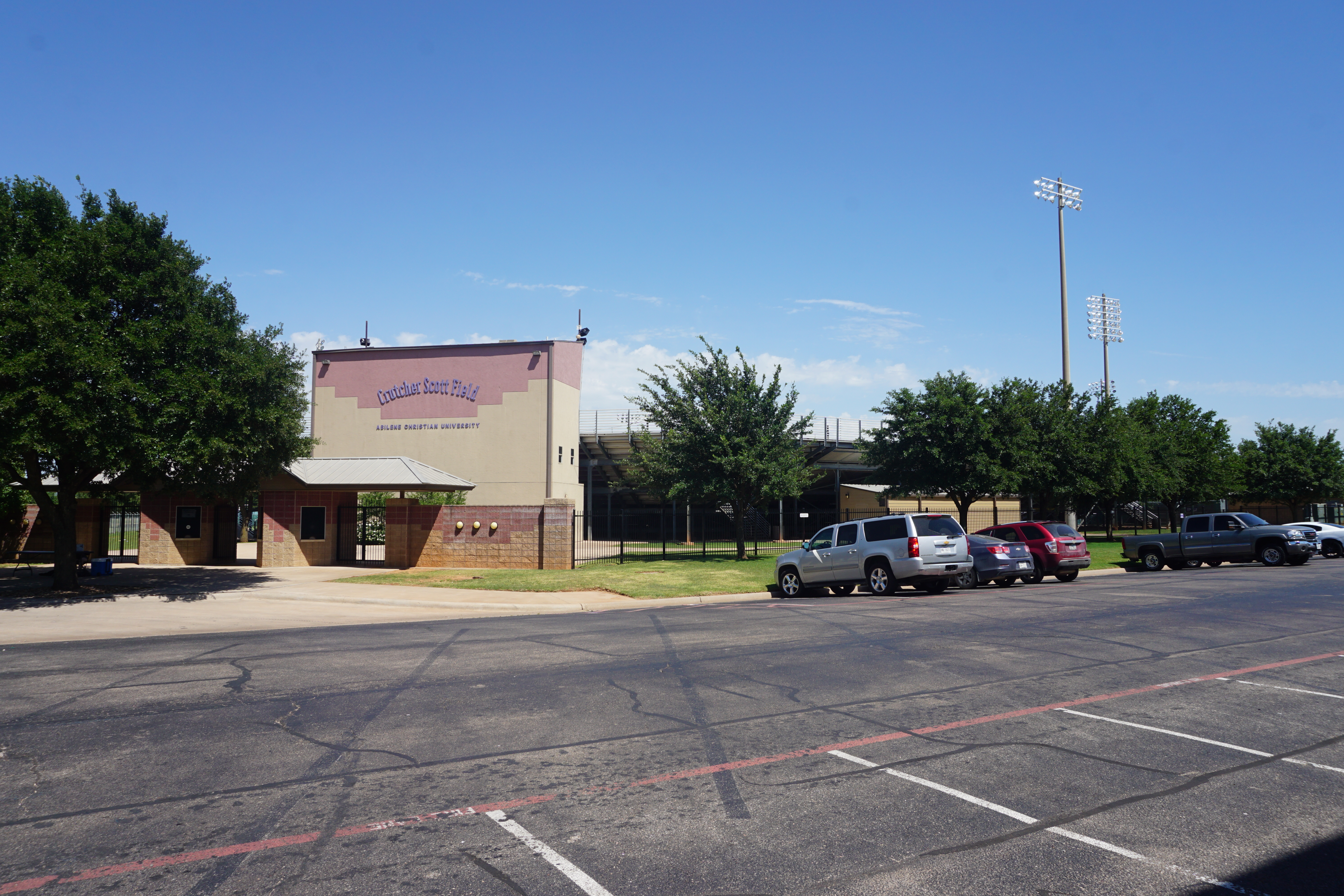
Crutcher Scott Field

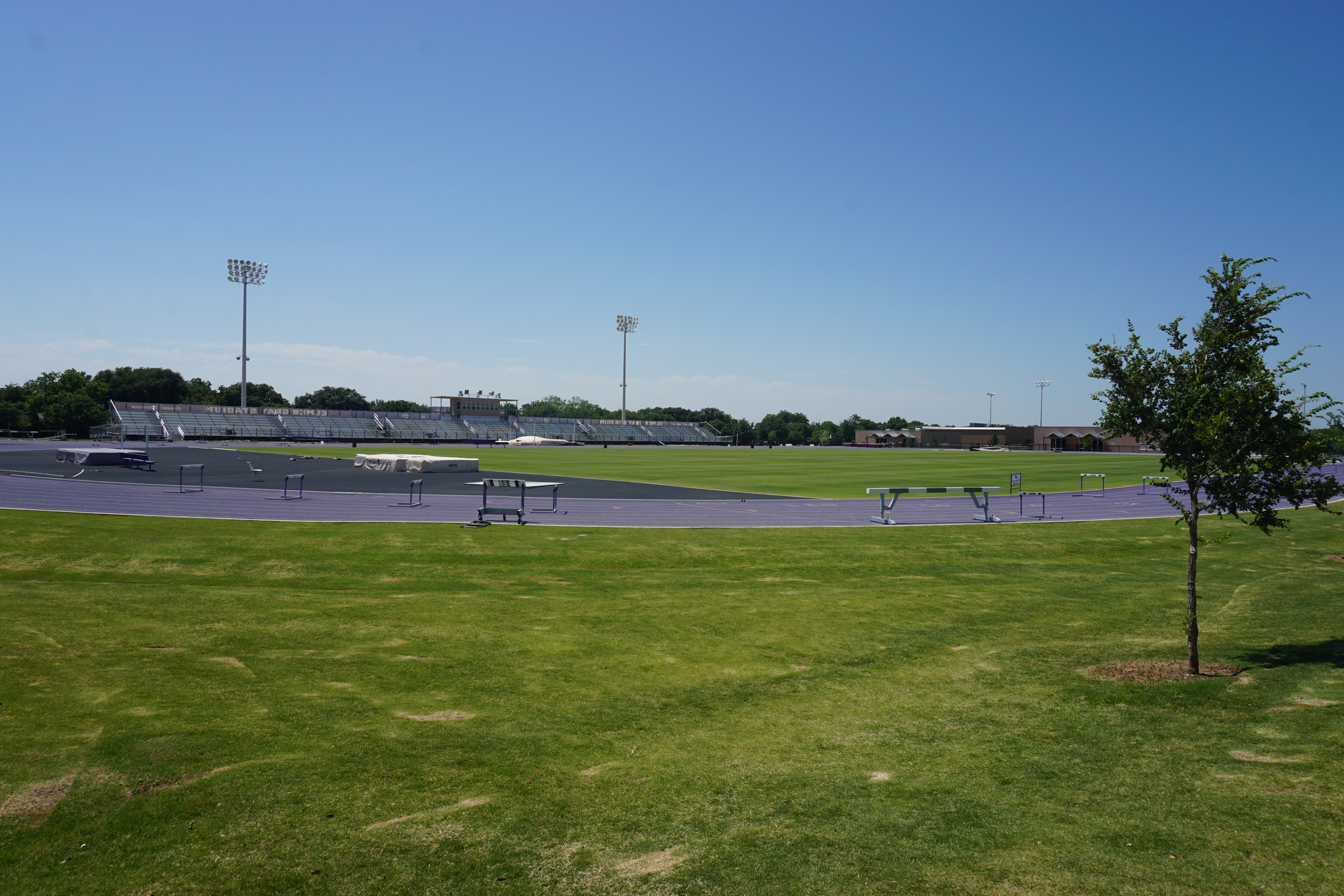
Elmer Gray Stadium

== Championships ==
=== National championships ===
Sport	Division II	NAIA Division I
Cross Country (Men's), NCAA Division II	2006, 2007	
Football, NAIA Division I		1973, 1977
Track and Field (Men's Indoor), NCAA Division II, NAIA Division I	1988, 1993, 1994, 1996, 1997, 1998, 1999, 2000, 2002, 2003, 2004, 2005, 2011	1978
Golf (Men's), NCAA Division II	1993	
Track and Field (Women's Indoor), NCAA Division II	1988, 1989, 1990, 1991, 1993, 1994, 1995, 1996, 1997, 1998, 1999, 2000	
Track and Field (Men's Outdoor), NCAA Division II, NAIA Division I	1982, 1983, 1984, 1985, 1986, 1987, 1988, 1996, 1997, 1999, 2000, 2002, 2003, 2004, 2005, 2006, 2007, 2008, 2011	1952, 1954, 1955, 1978, 1982
Track and Field (Women's Outdoor), NCAA Division II	1985, 1986, 1987, 1988, 1994, 1995, 1996, 1998, 1999, 2008	

=== Lone Star Conference ===
Sport	Season
Baseball	1993, 1996, 2000, 2001, 2002, 2009, 2010
Men's Basketball	1984–85, 1985–86, 1986–87
Women's Basketball	1982–83, 1983–84, 1984–85, 1985–86, 1991–92, 1995–96, 1997–98, 1998–99
Men's Cross Country	1980, 1982, 1983, 1985, 1987, 1988, 1991, 1992, 1993, 1994, 1995, 1996, 1997, 1998, 1999, 2000, 2001, 2002, 2003, 2004, 2005, 2006, 2007, 2008, 2009, 2010
Women's Cross Country	1983, 1984, 1991, 1993, 1994, 1995, 1996, 1997, 2001, 2002, 2003, 2004, 2005, 2006, 2007
Football	1973, 1977, 2008, 2010
Golf (Men's)	1985, 1986, 1987, 1988, 1989, 1991, 1993, 1995, 2010
Soccer (Women's)	2010
Tennis (Men's)	1988, 1990, 1995, 1998, 2002, 2003, 2004, 2005, 2007, 2009, 2010
Tennis (Women's)	1985, 1986, 1987, 1988, 1989, 1990, 1991, 1992, 1993, 1994, 1995, 1996, 1997, 1999, 2000, 2002, 2004, 2005, 2006, 2008, 2009, 2010
Track and Field (Men's)	1978, 1979, 1980, 1981, 1984, 1985, 1986, 1987, 1988, 1993, 1994, 1996, 1997, 1998, 1999, 2000, 2001, 2002, 2003, 2004, 2005, 2006, 2007, 2008, 2009, 2010, 2011, 2012
Track and Field (Women's)	1983, 1984, 1985, 1986, 1987, 1988, 1989, 1990, 1991, 1992, 1993, 1994, 1996, 1997, 1998, 1999, 2000, 2001, 2002, 2003, 2006, 2007, 2008
Volleyball	2004, 2005

== Notable non-varsity sports ==
ACU currently has club sports in Men's Lacrosse, Men's Rugby, Men's Soccer, and Co-Ed Golf. ACU Athletics took over all club sports on the ACU campus in January 2017 and named Todd Rogers as the Director of Club Sports, who oversees all 4 sports. Todd is an Abilene native and a December 2016 graduate of Texas Tech University. As the Director of Club Sports, Rogers will oversee the university's nationally competitive program with the hopes of driving enrollment and adding more club sports in the future.

== ACU athletes in halls of fame ==
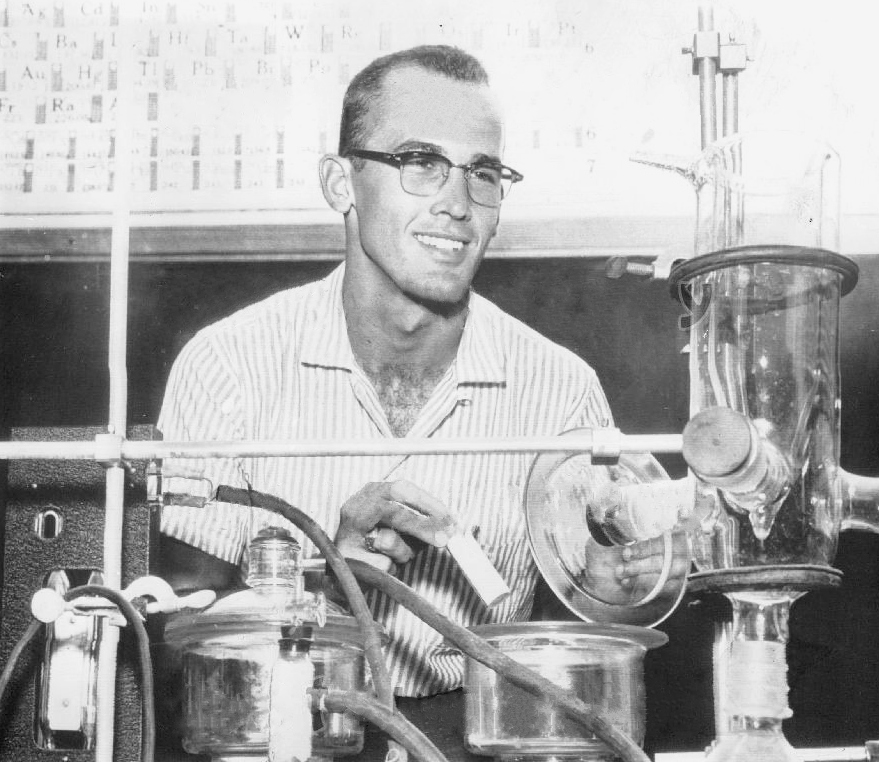
Bobby Morrow

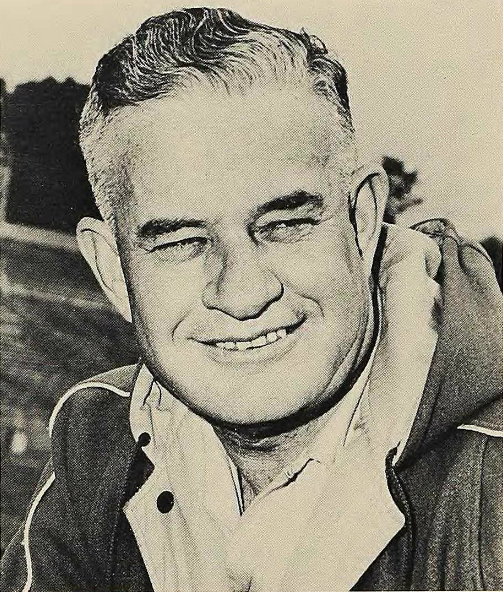
Tonto Coleman

Athlete	Sport HOF	Year
Bobby Morrow	Drake Relays	1959
Bobby Morrow	Texas Sports	1960
Bobby Morrow	U.S. Track and Field	1975
Bobby Morrow	Track and field U.S. Olympic	1989
Tonto Coleman	Texas Sports	1983
Eck Curtis	Texas Sports	1985
Wilbert Montgomery	College football	1996
Billy Olson	Track and field	1997
Wally Bullington	Football	1999
Wes Kittley	Track and field	2006
John Layfield	WWE	2020 (Note: Layfield played football at ACU)

== Media ==
All Abilene Christian athletics are broadcast on ESPN+ and KHXS.
