= Cleburne Independent School District =

School district in Texas, United States

Location
- Cleburne, Texas United States of America

District information
- Type: Public, Independent school district
- Motto: Every student, every day
- Grades: PK-12
- Established: 1887
- Superintendent: Dr.Coby Kirkpatrick
- Governing agency: Texas Education Agency
- Budget: roughly $80–90 million per year.

Students and staff
- Students: 6,566
- Teachers: 448.2
- Staff: 910.1

Other information
- Website: www.c-isd.com

Cleburne Independent School District is a public school district based in Cleburne, Texas.

In 2009, the school district was rated "academically acceptable" by the Texas Education Agency.

== History ==
On July 1, 1988, Liberty Chapel Independent School District merged into Cleburne ISD.

== Schools ==
High school (Grades 9-12)

- Cleburne High School

- Cleburne has won three state championships. The most recent was in 1995 in 4A girls basketball, and twice before in football, both times being recognized as co-champions when the championship game ended in a tie. The first title was in 1920 (with Houston Heights High School), which was also the first championship recognized by Dave Campbell's Texas Football. The second was in 1959 at Class AAA, a co-championship with Breckenridge.

- DeWayne Burns, a 1990 Cleburne High School graduate and former member of the school district board, was elected to the Texas House of Representatives in 2014.

Middle schools (Grades 6-8)

- Lowell Smith Jr. Middle School
- A.D. Wheat Middle School

Elementary schools
Grades K-5
- Adams Elementary School
- Cooke Elementary School
- Gerard Elementary School
- Marti Elementary School
Grades PK-5
- Coleman Elementary School
- Irving Elementary School
- Santa Fe Elementary School
Alternative High School Education

- TEAM School
