= Dave Parks =

American football player (1941–2019)

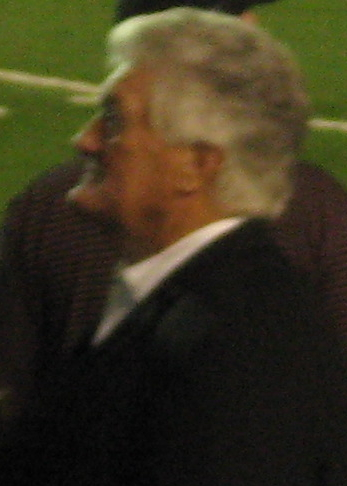
- Parks in 2008

No. 81, 83
- Positions: Wide receiver, tight end

Personal information
- Born: December 25, 1941; Muenster, Texas, U.S.
- Died: August 8, 2019 (aged 77); Austin, Texas, U.S.
- Listed height: 6 ft 2 in (1.88 m)
- Listed weight: 220 lb (100 kg)

Career information
- High school: Abilene (Abilene, Texas)
- College: Texas Tech
- NFL draft: 1964: 1st round, 1st overall pick
- AFL draft: 1964: 4th round, 32nd overall pick

Career history
- San Francisco 49ers (1964–1967); New Orleans Saints (1968–1972); Houston Oilers (1973); Southern California Sun (1974)

Awards and highlights
- 2× First-team All-Pro (1965, 1966); 3× Pro Bowl (1965–1967); NFL receptions leader (1965); NFL receiving yards leader (1965); NFL receiving touchdowns co-leader (1965); First-team All-American (1963); 2× First-team All-SWC (1962–1963); Texas Tech Red Raiders No. 81 retired

Career NFL statistics
- Receptions: 360
- Receiving yards: 5,619
- Receiving touchdowns: 44
- Stats at Pro Football Reference
- College Football Hall of Fame

David Wayne Parks (December 25, 1941 – August 8, 2019) was an American professional football wide receiver and tight end in the National Football League (NFL). He was the first overall selection in the 1964 NFL draft out of Texas Technological College (now Texas Tech University). Parks was selected to three Pro Bowls, and was an All-Pro selection two times. In 1965 he captured the "triple crown" of receiving, leading the NFL in receptions, receiving yards, and receiving touchdowns. In 2008 Parks was selected to be enshrined in the College Football Hall of Fame.

== Career ==
=== High school ===
Parks attended Abilene High School (Abilene, Texas) and played football for head coach Chuck Moser.

=== College ===
Parks played at the college level for the Texas Tech Red Raiders in 1961–1963. While at Texas Tech, Parks set several school records and earned many accolades. During his junior season in 1962, Parks was named an All-Southwest Conference selection.

Following his final season in 1963, Parks became the first player in Texas Tech history to be named an Associated Press All-American, and also earned selections from Sporting News, Time, Boston Recorder-American, Sports Extra, the American Football Coaches Association, and Football Weekly. Additionally, Parks received invitations to the East West Shrine Game, the Senior Bowl, and the Coaches All-America Game.

Upon his graduation, Parks held the school records for career receptions (80), single-season receptions (32), single game receptions (8 vs. Kansas State in 1963), and single game receiving yards (132 vs Kansas State in 1963). His record for longest interception return of 98 yards that occurred during a 1962 game versus Colorado still remains a school record.

Parks was one of only five Texas Tech players to have their jerseys retired and along with E.J. Holub, Donny Anderson, Gabe Rivera, and Zach Thomas. He was named to the inaugural class of the Texas Tech Ring of Honor, which honors the players by engraving their names into a ring around Jones AT&T Stadium, and has been the only Red Raider selected as the 1st overall pick of the NFL Draft.

Parks was voted into the College Football Hall of Fame in 2008, joining fellow Red Raiders Donny Anderson, Hub Bechtol, E. J. Holub, and Gabriel Rivera. Parks was also inducted into the Texas Sports Hall of Fame in 2012.

=== NFL ===
Parks was the first overall selection of the 1964 NFL draft by the San Francisco 49ers. He was one of only three people to be drafted No. 1 as a wide receiver, alongside Irving Fryar in 1984 and Keyshawn Johnson in 1996. Six games into his rookie season, Parks set a franchise record for longest reception with an 83-yard catch, followed by the team's second longest reception, an 80-yarder, a week later. Both records stood for 13 years. In 1965, he achieved the receiving triple crown, leading the National Football League in receptions with 80, receiving yards with 1,344, and receiving touchdowns with 12. For his performance, he was selected to the 1965 Pro Bowl and was named to the 1965 All-Pro Team. He was named to the 1966 All-Pro Team and went on to attend the 1966 Pro Bowl and the 1967 Pro Bowl.

After playing his option year with the 49ers in 1967, Parks signed as a free agent with the New Orleans Saints in 1968. In the second of only four times the NFL exercised the Rozelle rule, the 49ers received Kevin Hardy and a 1969 first-round selection (7th overall–Ted Kwalick) as compensation. He spent five seasons with the Saints.

In 1973, he played for the Houston Oilers, and retired after the season. He ended his career with 360 receptions, 5,619 receiving yards, a 15.6 average, and 44 touchdowns.

== NFL career statistics ==
Legend
	Led the league
**Bold**	Career high

=== Regular season ===
Year	Team	Games		Receiving				
Year	Team	GP	GS	Rec	Yds	Avg	Lng	TD
1964	SF	**14**	**14**	36	703	**19.5**	**83**	8
1965	SF	**14**	**14**	**80**	**1,344**	16.8	53	**12**
1966	SF	13	13	66	974	14.8	65	5
1967	SF	9	9	26	313	12.0	43	2
1968	NO	10	10	25	258	10.3	41	0
1969	NO	**14**	**14**	31	439	14.2	40	3
1970	NO	13	11	26	447	17.2	38	2
1971	NO	**14**	13	35	568	16.2	42	5
1972	NO	12	9	32	542	16.9	66	6
1973	HOU	5	0	3	31	10.3	12	1
Career		118	107	360	5,619	15.6	83	44

== Personal life ==
He lived in Austin, Texas, and served as the associate director of the Texas Ranger Law Enforcement Organization. Parks would go on to invent the 'Speedy Weedy', a lawn and garden tool. Parks died on August 7, 2019, aged 77.
