= Shane Stockton =

American singer-songwriter

- Born: Kelly Shane Brooks; March 18, 1974 (age 52)
- Origin: Breckenridge, Texas, United States
- Genres: Country
- Occupation: Singer-songwriter
- Instruments: Vocals, guitar
- Years active: 1998
- Label: Decca

Kelly Shane Brooks (born March 18, 1974), using the stage name of Shane Stockton, is a former American country music singer. He released one album, Stories I Could Tell, through Decca Records Nashville in 1998.

== Biography ==
Kelly Brooks was born in Breckenridge, Texas, United States. Recording as Shane Stockton, Kelly released a single "What If I'm Right." In June 1998, Decca released his only album, Stories I Could Tell. Kelly wrote every song on the album, with one being co-written. Kelly sang with Buck Owens in Bakersfield, California, at Buck Owens' birthday party. "What If I'm Right" peaked at number 54 on the country music charts, and the album's second single, "Gonna Have to Fall", reached number 51. One of his songs, "My Baby No Está Aquí No More", appeared on Garth Brooks's 2005 album The Lost Sessions. Kelly Brooks lost his recording contract in 1999 and has not recorded since. In 2001, this time going as Shane Brooks, Kelly became the pastor at Elgin Avenue Baptist Church in Lubbock, Texas, which later changed its name to Freedom Fellowship. Kelly remained there until 2010 when the church disbanded.

== Discography ==
=== Albums ===
Title	Album details
Stories I Could Tell	Release date: June 2, 1998; Label: Decca Records; Format: CD, cassette

=== Singles ===
Year	Single	Peak chart positions	
Year	Single	US Country	CAN Country
1998	"What If I'm Right"	54	86
1998	"Gonna Have to Fall"	51	92
"—" denotes releases that did not chart

=== Music videos ===
Year	Title	Director
1998	"What If I'm Right"	Gerry Wenner
1998	"Gonna Have to Fall"	Jeffrey Phillips
