= Solya =

American musician (born 2006)

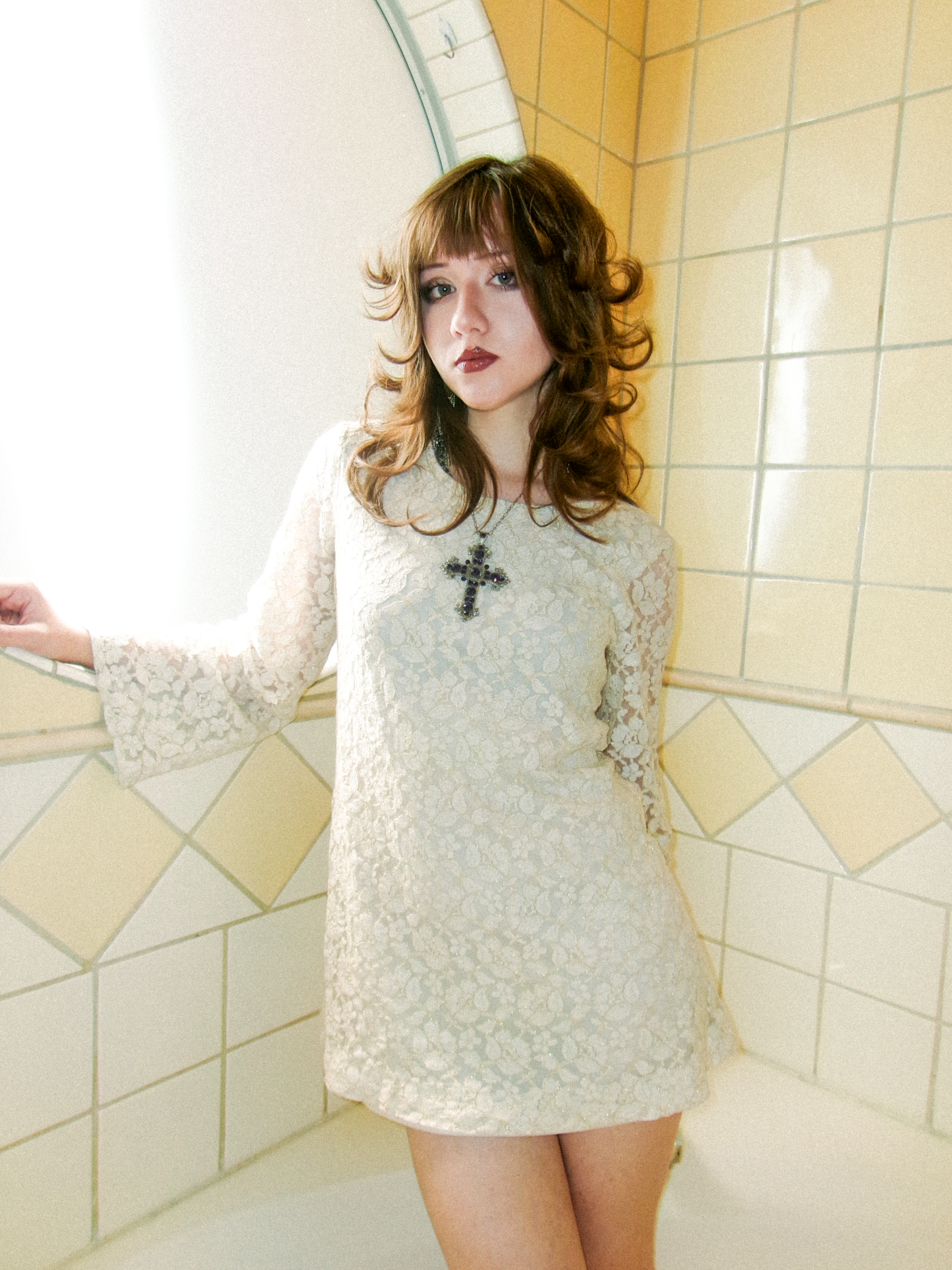
- Solya, 2026

Background information
- Born: Solya Ava Lowe; April 6, 2006 (age 20); Lubbock, Texas, U.S.
- Origin: Abilene, Texas, U.S.
- Genres: Alternative rock; dream pop; indie rock; Americana
- Occupations: Singer; songwriter; multi-instrumentalist; record producer
- Instruments: Vocals; guitar; synthesizers; piano
- Years active: 2023–present
- Label: Version III
- Website: solyamusic.com

Solya performing at the Pacific Electric, in September, 2026.

Solya Ava Lowe (born April 6, 2006), known professionally as Solya, is an American singer, songwriter, multi-instrumentalist, and record producer from Abilene, Texas. She began releasing music independently in 2023 before signing with the independent record label VERSION III the following year. After issuing a series of singles, Solya released her debut studio album, Queen of Texas, in 2026.

== Early life ==
Solya Ava Lowe was born on April 6, 2006, in Lubbock, Texas. She spent part of her childhood in Pittsburgh, until the age of seven when her family relocated to Abilene, Texas. She began playing the piano at the age of six and later learned guitar and synthesizer as a teenager.

Solya attended Abilene High School, graduating early before signing a recording contract with the independent record label VERSION III in 2024.

== Career ==
=== 2023–2024: Early releases ===
Solya began releasing music independently in 2023. In February, she self-released, Fever Dream, a three-track project that she produced herself. Later that year, she released the standalone single "Tear Me Apart".

=== 2025–present: Queen of Texas ===
In July 2025, Solya began work on her debut studio album, Queen of Texas

On January 7, 2026, she announced the album alongside its lead single, "Tell Me It's Over". Two days later, the song was included in Rolling Stone's weekly "Songs You Need to Know" feature. Uproxx featured Solya as "An Artist You Gotta Hear" ahead of the release of Queen of Texas.

Queen of Texas was released in March 2026, through VERSION III. The album was recorded in Lockhart, Texas, with production by Danny Reisch Jason Chronis contributed bass guitar and lead guitar. Solya wrote all of the tracks on the album and performed rhythm guitar, synthesizers, and piano. Following its release, she debuted at No. 17 on the Billboard Emerging Artists chart during the week of March 14, 2026.

== Artistry ==
Solya has cited Cocteau Twins, Patsy Cline, the Flaming Lips and David Bowie as influences on her music. In reviewing the single "Every Road I Know", Noisescape Magazine wrote that Solya's "blend of bluesy indie rock with heavenly synth" was a style in which she "clearly thrives". The Dallas Morning News described her sound as "surreal, retro-leaning ballads at the intersection of Lana Del Rey and Julee Cruise".

== Discography ==
=== Albums ===
Title	Details
Queen of Texas	Released: March 6, 2026; Label: Version III; Formats: LP, CD, digital download, streaming

=== EPs ===
Title	Details
Fever Dream	Released: February 10, 2023; Label: Self-released
Jewel Box	Released: October 11, 2024; Label: Version III

=== Singles ===
Title	Year	Album
"Roadkill"	2023	Non-album singles
"Heaven"	2023	Non-album singles
"Tear Me Apart"	2023	Non-album singles
"Antlers"	2024	Non-album singles
"Monster (Unplugged)"	2024	Non-album singles
"Put Your Head On My Shoulder"	2025	Non-album singles
"Not Sorry"	2025	Non-album singles
"19"	2026	Queen of Texas
"Movie Star"	2026	Queen of Texas
"Silver Swan"	2026	Queen of Texas
"Born Wicked"	2026	Queen of Texas
"Tell Me It’s Over"	2026	Queen of Texas
