= Maury Bray =

American football player (1909–1966)

No. 3, 11
- Position: Tackle

Personal information
- Born: August 27, 1909; Paducah, Texas, U.S.
- Died: December 8, 1966 (aged 57); Tahoka, Texas, U.S.
- Listed height: 6 ft 2 in (1.88 m)
- Listed weight: 220 lb (100 kg)

Career information
- High school: Abilene (Abilene, Texas)
- College: SMU (1929–1932)

Career history
- Dallas Rams (1934); Pittsburgh Pirates (1935–1936)

Career NFL statistics
- Games played: 24
- Games started: 5
- Stats at Pro Football Reference

Andrew Maurice Bray (August 27, 1909 – December 8, 1966) was an American professional football tackle who played two seasons with the Pittsburgh Pirates of the National Football League (NFL). He played college football at Southern Methodist University.

== Early life and college ==
Andrew Maurice Bray was born on August 27, 1909, in Paducah, Texas. He attended Abilene High School in Abilene, Texas.

Bray was a member of the SMU Mustangs of Southern Methodist University from 1929 to 1932 and a two-year letterman from 1931 to 1932.

== Professional career ==
Bray played in four games, starting two, for the Dallas Rams of the American Football League in 1934. He was listed as a tackle and end while with the Rams and wore jersey number 17.

He appeared in all 12 games, starting one, for the Pittsburgh Pirates of the National Football League during the 1935 season. Bray played in 12 games, starting four, in 1936.

== Personal life ==
Bray died on December 8, 1966, in Tahoka, Texas.
