= Gabriel Rivera =

American football player (1961–2018)

No. 69
- Position: Nose tackle

Personal information
- Born: April 7, 1961; Crystal City, Texas, U.S.
- Died: July 16, 2018 (aged 57); San Antonio, Texas, U.S.
- Listed height: 6 ft 2 in (1.88 m)
- Listed weight: 293 lb (133 kg)

Career information
- High school: Jefferson (San Antonio)
- College: Texas Tech
- NFL draft: 1983: 1st round, 21st overall pick

Career history
- Pittsburgh Steelers (1983)

Awards and highlights
- Consensus All-American (1982); SWC Defensive Player of the Year (1982); First-team All-SWC (1982); SWC All-Decade Team

Career NFL statistics
- Games played: 6
- Sacks: 2
- Stats at Pro Football Reference
- College Football Hall of Fame

Gabriel Rivera (April 7, 1961 – July 16, 2018), nicknamed "Señor Sack", was an American professional football player who was a nose tackle in the National Football League (NFL). Rivera played college football for Texas Tech Red Raiders, earning consensus All-American honors in 1982. Rivera was a first-round pick in the 1983 NFL draft by the Pittsburgh Steelers.

== College career ==
Rivera attended Texas Tech University, and played for the Texas Tech Red Raiders football team from 1979 to 1982. At 6'3" and 230 pounds, he was recruited as a tight end and linebacker before growing to between 270 and 300 pounds. Despite his weight, Rivera was able to complete a 40-yard dash in 4.8 seconds as a noseguard. While at Texas Tech, he earned the nickname "Señor Sack".

Rivera finished his four-year career at Texas Tech with 321 tackles, 34 tackles for loss, 14 sacks, 11 pass deflections, and 6 fumble recoveries. His 1982 total of 105 tackles still holds the school record for most tackles by a defensive tackle. Rivera garnered significant national attention following a 10–3 loss against the #1 ranked 1982 Washington Huskies football team, in which he logged 10 tackles, 4 pass deflections, 4 quarterback pressures, and a sack.

In 1980, Rivera earned honorable-mention All-American honors as a sophomore. In 1982, he was recognized as a consensus first-team All-American as a senior defensive tackle. Additionally, Rivera was named the Southwest Conference Defensive Player of the Year, and would later be named to the Southwest Conference All-Decade team. He appeared in the 1982 Bob Hope Christmas Show and was introduced as an All American Defensive Lineman.

He was named to the National Football Foundation & College Hall of Fame in May 2012. He was named as the fourth member of Texas Tech's Ring of Honor on July 2, 2014, and had his name inscribed on Jones AT&T Stadium along with fellow College Football Hall of Fame members Donny Anderson, Dave Parks and E. J. Holub.

== Professional career ==
The Pittsburgh Steelers selected Rivera in the first round (21st pick overall) of the 1983 NFL Draft. Rivera's selection was notable because the Steelers decided to pass on hometown hero and University of Pittsburgh quarterback Dan Marino as heir apparent to Terry Bradshaw. Instead, head coach Chuck Noll chose to rebuild from the defensive side as the team had done a decade earlier with "Mean" Joe Greene. Rivera was considered to be one of the fastest defensive linemen coming out of college.

As the 1983 season progressed, Rivera slowly began to come on, getting two sacks in his first six games played. But on October 20, 1983, Rivera was paralyzed in a car wreck. Driving while drunk, he crossed into another lane and collided with another vehicle. The then 22-year-old was treated for head, neck, chest and abdominal injuries, as well as significant memory loss. The crash occurred at 9:00 p.m. in Ross Township, a northern suburb of Pittsburgh.

== Personal life ==
Rivera had three wives, Kimberly, whom he met at Texas Tech, they had a son Timothy; Carmen, whom he met during physical therapy; and Nancy, whom he met at the zoo, Gabriel adopted both of her daughters, Raenelda and Myste. Gabriel and Nancy were married from 1999 until his death in 2018. Gabriel also had 4 grandchildren, Hailey, Allen, Esben and Nathaniel. For the last 19 years of his life Gabriel was a volunteer at Inner City Development Center in San Antonio, Texas. While there he tutored and mentored at risk youth in the 78207 community which is also known as the Barrio.

He died on July 16, 2018, from complications related to a perforated bowel.
