= Breckenridge High School =

Coordinates: 32.7589°N 98.9079°W

Location
- 500 W Lindsay St; Breckenridge, Texas 76424-3496; United States

Information
- School type: Public high school
- School district: Breckenridge Independent School District
- Principal: Bryan Dieterich
- Teaching staff: 33.53 (FTE)
- Grades: 9–12
- Enrollment: 379 (2024-2025)
- Student to teacher ratio: 11.30
- Colors: Green & White
- Athletics conference: UIL Class 3A
- Mascot: Buckaroos/Lady Bucks
- Website: Breckenridge High School website

Breckenridge High School is a public high school located in the city of Breckenridge, Texas, and classified as a 3A school by the UIL. It is a part of the Breckenridge Independent School District located in Stephens County. In 2013, the school was rated "Met Standard" by the Texas Education Agency.

Breckenridge High School's mascot is a Buckaroo (a cowboy riding a bucking horse).

In 2014 the University Interscholastic League (UIL) released district realignments for many high schools in Texas. As a result of this realignment, Breckenridge High School went from being a 2A school to 3A.

== Athletics ==
The Breckenridge Buckaroos and Lady Bucks compete in the following sports

Cross Country, Football, Volleyball, Basketball, Golf, Tennis, Track, Softball, Baseball

=== Football ===
No team and community manifested the state's football culture more spectacularly than Breckenridge [...]. Until Gordon Wood's Brownwood Lions eclipsed them in 1960, the Buckaroos were the scourge of West Texas.

— Ty Cashion

Breckenridge's football success goes back to oil boom era in the late 1920s. P. E. Shotwell, who coached the Buckaroos from 1927–34, guided the team to the state finals in 1929, where they tied Port Arthur Jefferson 0–0 in the snowy weather of Waco. Under coach Eck Curtis (1935–44) they made the semifinals in 1942. Despite Breckenridge's declining population as the oil boom faded, the Buckaroos still played some of the largest schools in West Central Texas. With an enrollment of less than 400 students during the 1950s, Breckenridge's football varsity barely comprised 30 players. Yet, during the 1950s the Buckaroos formed a true dynasty under head coaches Cooper Robbins (1945–51), Joe Kerbel (1952–54) and Emory Bellard (1955–59). Breckenridge appeared in five Class 3A State Championship games, winning four times in 1951, 1952, 1954, and 1958 and tying Cleburne for the title in 1959. While at Breckenridge, Emory Bellard developed the wishbone formation.

=== State Titles ===
- Football
  - 1929*, 1951(3A), 1952(3A), 1954(3A), 1958(3A), 1959(3A)*
  - Co-champions*
- Girls Golf
  - 2000(3A), 2002(3A)
- Tennis -
  - 1998(3A)
- Ready Writing -
  - 2002(3A)

== Notable alumni ==
- Spot Collins, football player
- Jerry Tubbs, football player
- Don Robbins, college football player and head coach; member of the Junction Boys at Texas A&M
