= Abilene Christian Wildcats softball =

Abilene Christian Wildcats
- 2025 Abilene Christian Wildcats softball team
- University: Abilene Christian University
- Head coach: Jo Koons (2nd season)
- Conference: WAC
- Location: Abilene, Texas, US
- Home stadium: Poly Wells Field (capacity: 1,000)
- Nickname: Wildcats
- Colors: Purple and white

NCAA Tournament appearances
- 2005*, 2006*, 2008*, 2009*, 2012*; NCAA DII

The Abilene Christian Wildcats softball team represents Abilene Christian University, located in Abilene, Texas. The Wildcats are a member of the Western Athletic Conference and participate in Division I college softball. The team is currently led by head coach Jo Koons and plays home games at Poly Wells Field. In its inaugural 1997 season, the Wildcats finished with a remarkable #4 South Central Regional ranking and a #12 NCAA II ranking in March 1998.

== Year-by-year results ==
Season	Conference	Coach	Overall				Conference				Notes
Season	Conference	Coach	Games	Win	Loss	Tie	Games	Win	Loss	Tie	Notes
NCAA Year-by-Year Results
1997	Lone Star	Carol Tabor	56	38	18	0	16	12	4	0	2nd (1st South Division - T)
1998	Lone Star	Carol Tabor	63	31	22	0	16	8	8	0	5th (2nd South Division - T)
1999	Lone Star	Carol Tabor	36	16	20	0	16	3	13	0	9th (5th South Division)
2000	Lone Star	Carol Tabor	58	27	31	0	16	9	7	0	4th (Most Wins, South Division)
2001	Lone Star	Carol Tabor	44	22	22	0	16	8	8	0	6th (3rd South Division)
2002	Lone Star	Carol Tabor	35	14	21	0	14	6	8	0	8th (5th South Division)
2003	Lone Star	Carol Tabor	55	24	31	0	20	7	13	0	7th T (4th South Division - T)
		Carol Tabor	347	172	165	0	114	53	61	0	
2004	Lone Star	Chantiel Wilson	50	20	30	0	20	7	13	0	10th (5th South Division)
2005	Lone Star	Chantiel Wilson	53	31	22	0	20	13	7	0	3rd (2nd South Division)
2006	Lone Star	Chantiel Wilson	63	42	19	0	22	18	4	0	1st (1st South Division)
2007	Lone Star	Chantiel Wilson	49	25	24	0	24	10	14	0	10th (6th South Division)
2008	Lone Star	Chantiel Wilson	61	34	27	0	18	12	6	0	5th (3rd South Division)
2009	Lone Star	Chantiel Wilson	58	43	15	0	18	15	3	0	2nd (1st South Division)
2010	Lone Star	Chantiel Wilson	52	21	31	0	17	5	12	0	12th (6th South Division)
		Chantiel Wilson	386	216	168	0	139	80	59	0	
2011	Lone Star	Bobby Reeves	55	28	27	0	21	11	10	0	7th T (4th South Division - T)
2012	Lone Star	Bobby Reeves	48	30	18	0	26	15	11	0	5th
2013	Lone Star	Bobby Reeves	54	28	26	0	27	12	15	0	7th
2014	Southland	Bobby Reeves	49	21	28	0	20	10	10	0	7th
2015	Southland	Bobby Reeves	51	14	33	0	27	8	19	0	10th
2016	Southland	Bobby Reeves	47	26	21	0	24	16	8	0	3rd
2017	Southland	Bobby Reeves	55	33	22	0	27	20	7	0	2nd
2018	Southland	Bobby Reeves	49	23	26	0	27	15	12	0	6th
2019	Southland	Bobby Reeves	44	13	31	0	27	6	21	0	10th
		Bobby Reeves	452	216	232	0	226	113	113	0	
2020	Southland	Abigail Farler	24	7	17	0	3	0	3	0	Season cut short by COVID-19 pandemic
2021	Southland	Abigail Farler	47	14	33	0	27	10	17	0	8th
2022	WAC	Abigail Farler	51	25	26	0	24	15	9	0	3rd T (2nd Southwest Division)
2023	WAC	Abigail Farler	52	16	36	0	24	10	14	0	8th T
2024	WAC	Abigail Farler	48	16	32	0	26	8	18	0	10th
		Abigail Farler	222	78	148	0	104	43	61	0	
2025	WAC	Jo Koons	53	15	38	0	24	11	13	0	T–4th
2026	WAC	Jo Koons	48	7	41	0	18	4	14	0	7th
		Jo Koons	101	22	79	0	42	15	27	0	
Team; Overall			1,509	704	799	0	625	304	321	0	
