= Cleburne High School =

School in Texas, United States

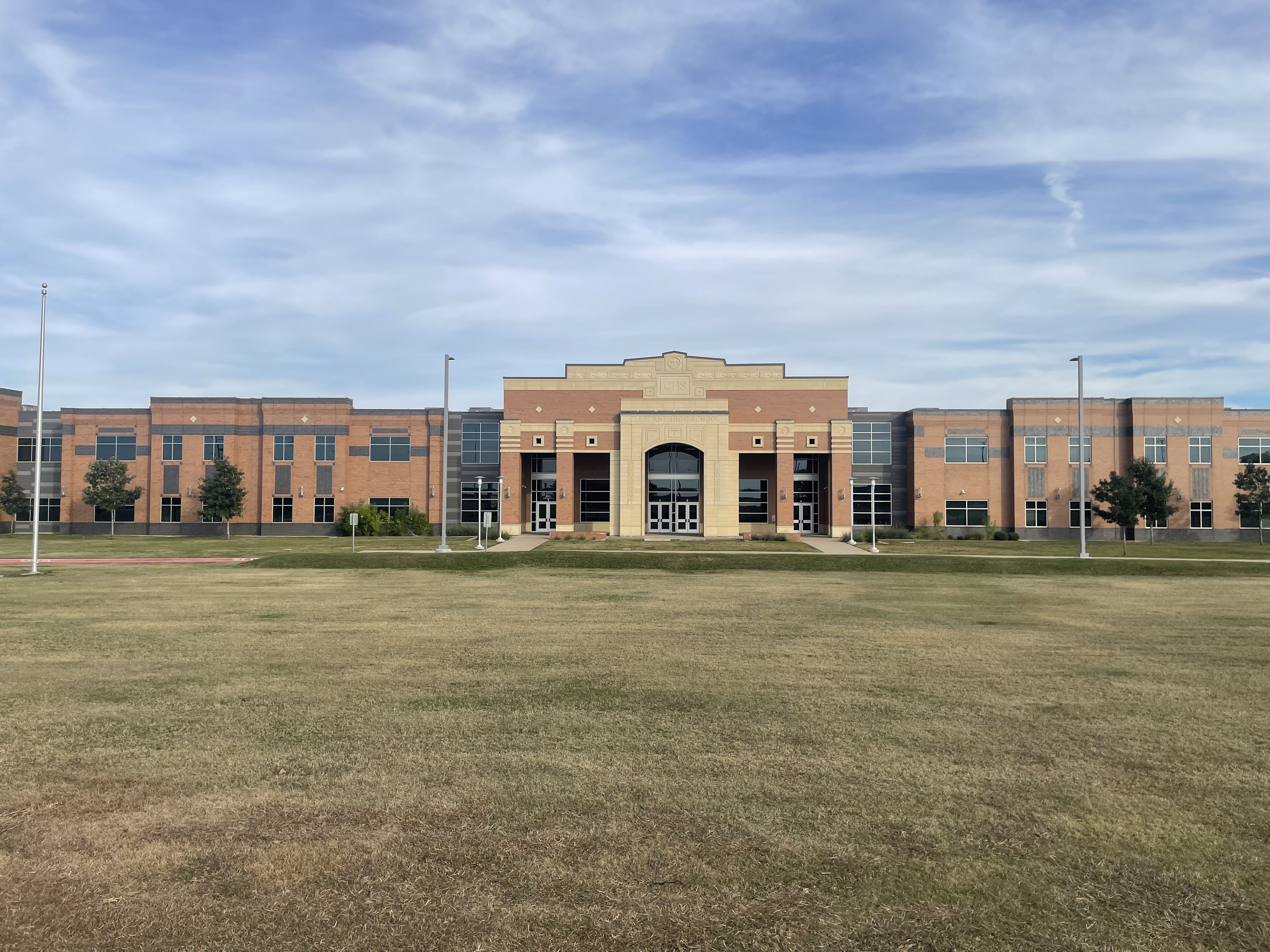

Location
- 850 Nolan River Road, Cleburne, Texas, United States; 32.3472°N 97.4269°W

Information
- Type: Public high school
- Motto: Excellence Happens Here
- Established: 1884
- School district: Cleburne Independent School District
- Superintendent: Dr. Coby Kirkpatrick
- CEEB code: 441335
- NCES School ID: 481431000917
- Principal: Dr. Karen Holweg
- Staff: 143.97 (on an FTE basis)
- Grades: 9-12
- Gender: Coeducational
- Enrollment: 1,849 (2024–2025)
- Student to teacher ratio: 12.84
- Colors: Black and gold
- Athletics conference: University Interscholastic League
- Mascot: The Yellow Jacket
- Rival: Burleson High School
- Newspaper: The Buzz News
- Yearbook: Santa Fe Trail
- Feeder schools: A.D. Wheat Middle School
- Website: chs.c-isd.com

Cleburne High School is a public high school located in the city of Cleburne, Texas. The school is in the Cleburne Independent School District.

== History ==
A high school was occupied in Cleburne in the 1910s, replacing an older schoolhouse.

The school was completely renovated in 2020.

== Sports ==
The Cleburne Yellow Jackets play football games at the Yellow Jacket Stadium. The stadium was built in time for the 1941 football season, on a plot of land that was in possession of the then-Superintendent Emmett Brown. At this point, the team was coached by Ernest Guinn, future principal and later superintendent.

Cleburne has won three state championships. The most recent was in 1995 in 4A girls basketball, and twice before in football, both times being recognized as co-champions when the championship game ended in a tie. The first title was in 1920 (with Houston Heights High School), which was also the first championship recognized by Dave Campbell's Texas Football. The second was in 1959 at Class AAA, a co-championship with Breckenridge.

== Notable alumni ==
- Pat Culpepper - College football player and coach
- David McWilliams - College football player and coach
