= Abilene High School (Texas) =

Coordinates: 32°27′22″N 99°45′21″W

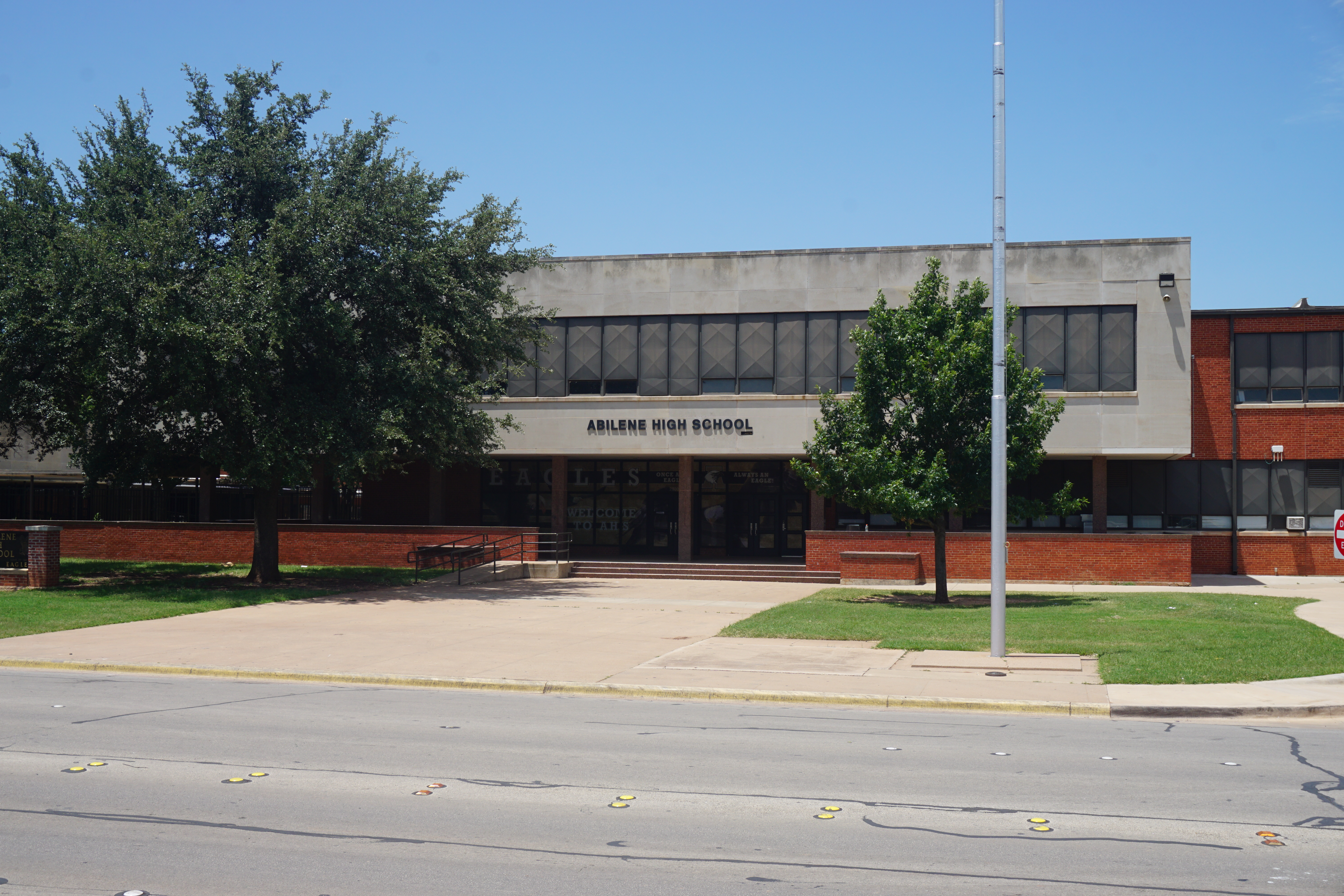

Location
- 2800 N 6th St; Abilene, Texas 79603-7190; United States

Information
- School type: Public high school
- Motto: "Enter to learn, go forth to serve."
- Established: 1888
- School district: Abilene Independent School District
- Principal: Emme Siburt
- Staff: 110.00 (FTE)
- Grades: 9-12
- Student to teacher ratio: 17.30
- Colors: Black & Gold
- Athletics conference: UIL Class 5A/D1
- Mascot: Eagle
- Nickname: Warbirds
- Website: Abilene High School

Abilene High School is a public high school located in Abilene, Texas. AHS is classified as a Division 5A school and is part of the Abilene Independent School District. Abilene High School is the name given to three different schools in the past 150 years. The first Abilene High was an old warehouse. Not long after that, the school was moved to what was the former Lincoln Middle School. In 1955, Abilene High was moved to its current location at N 6th and Mockingbird. Its main rival in sports is Cooper High School. The Abilene High Marching Band is accepted to be the oldest marching band in Texas, and in 2026 celebrated its 100th year. In 2011, the school was rated "Academically Acceptable" by the Texas Education Agency.

In addition to parts of Abilene, its attendance boundary includes Impact.

== Athletics ==
Coached by P. E. Shotwell, for whom Shotwell Stadium is named, Abilene High won its first state championship in 1923. Coach Dewey Mayhew guided the Eagles to their second state title in 1928, and a third one in 1931. Under Chuck Moser, Abilene won three consecutive state titles (1954–56). In 2009, the Eagles had an undefeated season and won the Division II State Finals, giving the Abilene Eagles their seventh state championship and first in 53 years.

=== State titles ===
- Baseball –
  - 1956(All), 1957(4A)
- Football –
  - 1923(All), 1928(1A), 1931(1A), 1954(4A), 1955(4A), 1956(4A), 2009(5A/D2)
- Team Tennis –
  - 1991(5A), 1999(5A)
- Boys Track –
  - 1925(All) 1954(2A), 1959(4A), 1960(4A), 1961(4A), 1976(4A), 2001(5A)
- One Act Play –
  - 1930(All), 1943(All), 1946(All), 1949(2A), 1950(2A), 1964(4A), 1972(2A)

==== State finalists ====
- Baseball –
  - 1950(All), 1955(All)
- Boys Basketball -
  - 1938(All), 1941(All)
- Football –
  - 1922(All), 1927(1A)

== Fine arts ==
=== Pure Gold ===
Pure Gold is a by audition only, select choir made up of mostly juniors and seniors (but occasionally some sophomores).

== Notable people ==
- Maury Bray, NFL player for the Pittsburgh Pirates
- Randall "Tex" Cobb, actor
- Solya, singer-songwriter
- Wayne Coffey, American football player
- Jack Favor (Class of 1929), rodeo star falsely imprisoned for two murders in Louisiana
- A. C. Greene, historian, author, and newspaperman, known as the Dean of Texas Writers. 1923–2002
- Glynn Gregory, football player
- Chuck Harrison, MLB first baseman from 1965 to 1971
- Chuck Hughes, NFL wide receiver
- Bernard Kamungo, soccer player
- John Lackey, retired MLB pitcher for the Los Angeles Angels, Boston Red Sox, St. Louis Cardinals and Chicago Cubs; three-time World Series champion (2002, 2013 & 2016)
- Dave Parks, NFL wide receiver and end
- Harold Stephens, football player
- Jim Welch, running back, Southern Methodist University at Dallas, Baltimore Colts, Detroit Lions

== See also ==
- Wylie High School (Abilene, Texas)
- Cooper High School (Abilene, Texas)
