= Chuck Moser =

American football player and coach (1918–1995)

Biographical details
- Born: September 29, 1918; Chillicothe, Missouri, U.S.
- Died: May 7, 1995 (aged 76); Waco, Texas, U.S.

Playing career
- 1937–1939: Missouri
- Position: Center

Coaching career (HC unless noted)
- 1940–1941: Lexington HS (MO)
- 1946–1952: McAllen HS (TX)
- 1953–1959: Abilene HS (TX)
- 1974–1978: Texas A&M (offensive backfield)

Head coaching record
- Overall: 141–28–2

Accomplishments and honors

Awards
- Texas Sports Hall of Fame (1986)

Charles Hinton Moser (September 29, 1918 – May 7, 1995) was an American football coach. He was known for guiding Abilene High School to a 49-game winning streak from 1954 to 1957, which is still a Texas state record for 4A and 5A schools, though tied by Carroll Senior High School in 2007.

Moser played college football at the University of Missouri, where he was an all-conference center on Don Faurot's 1939 Missouri Tigers football team, which went to the 1940 Orange Bowl. He began his coaching career in Lexington, Missouri, but joined the United States Army Air Corps one year later. He became a navigator at Kelly Air Force Base in San Antonio. After World War II, Moser coached at McAllen High School before succeeding P. E. Shotwell at Abilene in 1953. Moser retired from coaching in early 1960 at age 41, to serve as athletic director of Abilene schools. He briefly returned to coaching as offensive backfield coach under Emory Bellard at Texas A&M University.
