= Stories I Could Tell =

Studio album by Shane Stockton
- Released: June 2, 1998
- Genre: Country
- Length: 35:05
- Label: Decca
- Producer: Mark Wright

Stories I Could Tell is the only album by American country music singer Shane Stockton (Kelly Brooks). It was released in June 1998 by Decca Records. The album includes the singles "What If I'm Right" and "Gonna Have to Fall".

== Critical reception ==
Professional ratings
Review scores
Source	Rating
Allmusic	3/5 stars
Country Standard Time	(mixed)

Jon Weisberger of Country Standard Time said the songs had "too many solid melodies and arrangements betrayed by awkward, uninspired lyrics." Jana Pendragon of Allmusic rated the album two stars out of five, writing “As for depth beyond the heartbreaking kind, Stockton's songwriting shows an interesting bent on "Geronimo." As for foundation, it sounds as if Stockton knows where country music comes from, as he exhibits on "My Life's an Open Book," a pleasant waltz; "Billy Saw the Light" is just as good. Sadly, there are just too many other guys out there doing the very same thing.”

== Track listing ==
All songs written by Shane Stockton; "I Didn't Know" co-written by Dave Stephenson and Mark Wright.

1. "Somewhere in the Ashes" - 3:52
2. "What If I'm Right" - 3:04
3. "I Didn't Know" - 3:26
4. "Don't Let the Fool Fool You" - 2:57
5. "Gonna Have to Fall" - 3:10
6. "Train, Train" - 4:21
7. "Geronimo" - 3:52
8. "Stories I Could Tell" - 3:49
9. "My Life's an Open Book" - 3:25
10. "Billy Saw the Light" - 3:09

== Personnel ==
- Chad Cromwell - drums
- Linda Davis - background vocals
- Pat Flynn - acoustic guitar
- Larry Franklin - fiddle, mandolin
- David Hungate - bass guitar, upright bass
- Carl Jackson - background vocals
- B. James Lowry - 8-string guitar, acoustic guitar, electric guitar
- Liana Manis - background vocals
- Brent Mason - acoustic guitar, electric guitar
- Nashville String Machine - strings
- Michael Omartian - string arrangements
- Al Perkins - Dobro, steel guitar
- Matt Rollings - Hammond organ, piano
- John Wesley Ryles - background vocals
- Gary Smith - Hammond organ
- Harry Stinson - background vocals
- Shane Stockton - acoustic guitar, lead vocals, background vocals
- Danea Mitchell Wallace - background vocals

== Singles ==
Year	Single	Peak chart positions	
Year	Single	US Country	CAN Country
1998	"What If I'm Right"	54	86
1998	"Gonna Have to Fall"	51	92
1998	"Somewhere in the Ashes"	—	—
"—" denotes releases that did not chart
