= Emil Hurja =

American politician

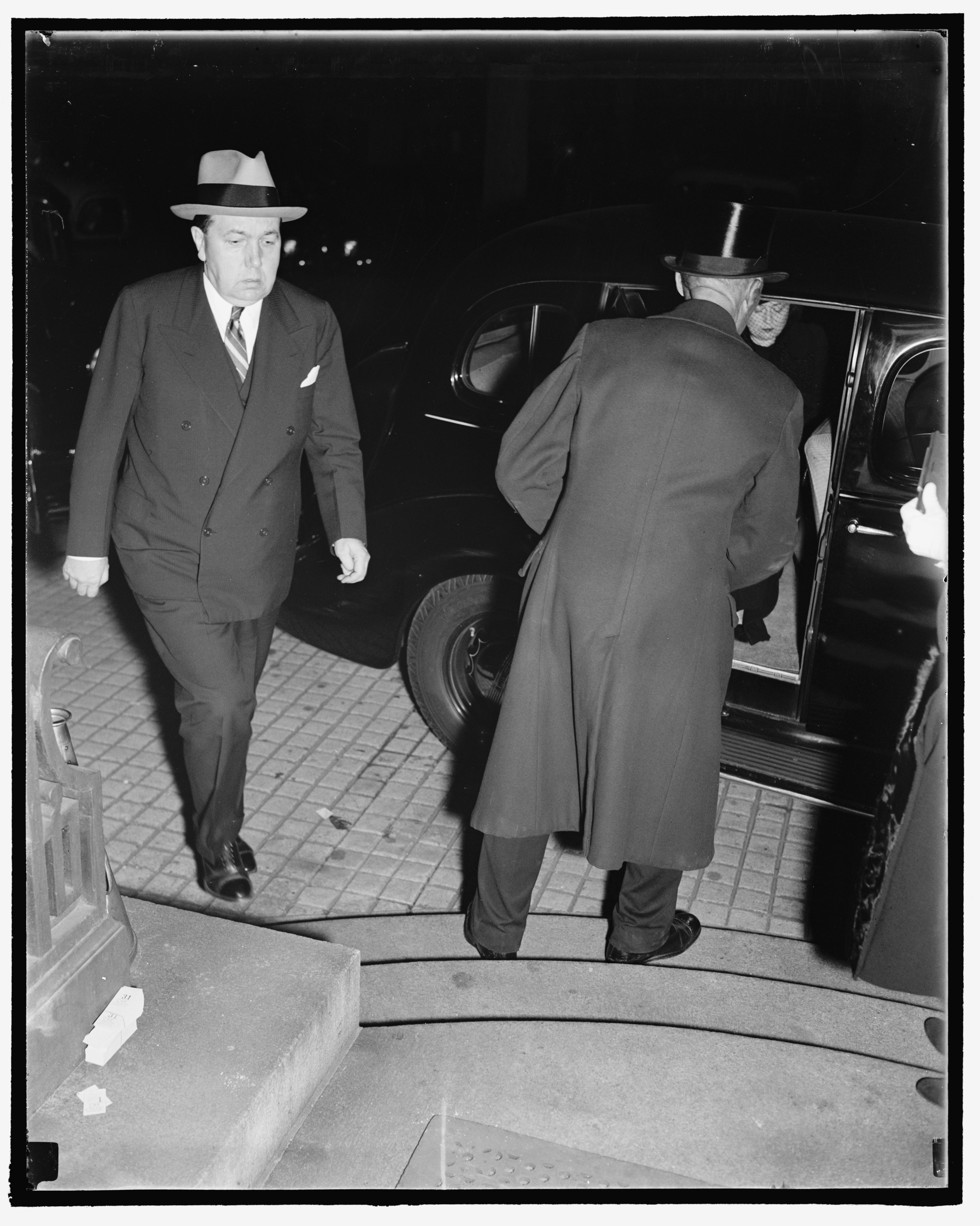
- Hurja in 1938
- Born: Emil Edward Hurja; 22 January 1892; Crystal Falls, Michigan, U.S.
- Died: 30 May 1953 (aged 61); Washington, D.C., U.S.
- Other names: Wizard of Washington
- Occupations: Newspaper editor, political consultant

Emil Edward Hurja (January 22, 1892 – May 30, 1953) was an American newspaper editor and political consultant. Hurja was a pioneer of political opinion polling and played an advisory role during the presidency of Franklin D. Roosevelt. He was known as the Wizard of Washington.

== Biography ==
Hurja was born in Crystal Falls, Michigan. He was one of twelve children born to Matt Hurja (originally Pitkäkangas), a shopkeeper, (1863–1931) and Anna Liisa (née Keisari) Hurja (1870–1940), both of whom were immigrants from Finland to the Upper Peninsula of Michigan. In 1917, he received his A.B. at the University of Washington, where he covered the Ford Peace Expedition of 1915 as a college journalist. He served as a captain in the United States Army during World War I. He worked as the newspaper editor for the Breckenridge Daily American (1921–1926) in Breckenridge, Texas. He was editor of the Pathfinder magazine (1939–1945).

Hurja was chief pollster of the Democratic National Committee (1932–1937) under the direction of Democratic National Committee Chairman James Farley, where he helped poll Roosevelt's campaign and the popularity of the New Deal. He also provided poll analysis for the Democratic Party during elections held during 1932, 1934 and 1936. Notably, he predicted that FDR would gain seats in the 1934 United States Senate elections due to the popularity of the New Deal, bucking the conventional wisdom that the President's party tends to lose seats in the midterm.

He was a delegate to the Democratic National Convention from Michigan and appeared on the cover of Time in March 1936. He was a candidate in the Republican primary for the House of Representative from the 12th District of the State of Michigan (1946–1948).

In 1919, he married Gudrun Andersen. He died in Washington, D.C. and was buried in Arlington National Cemetery.

== Honors ==
He was awarded both the Order of the White Rose of Finland and the Royal Norwegian Order of Saint Olav.

== Impact and legacy ==
G. Elliott Morris has called Hurja the first modern pollster.

== Related reading ==
- Sabato, Larry J. (1981) The Rise of Political Consultants (New York: Basic Books) ISBN 978-0465070398
- Johnston, Alva, "'Prof.'" Hurja, The New Deal's Political Doctor", The Saturday Evening Post (June 13, 1936)
