= Breckenridge, Texas =

- City
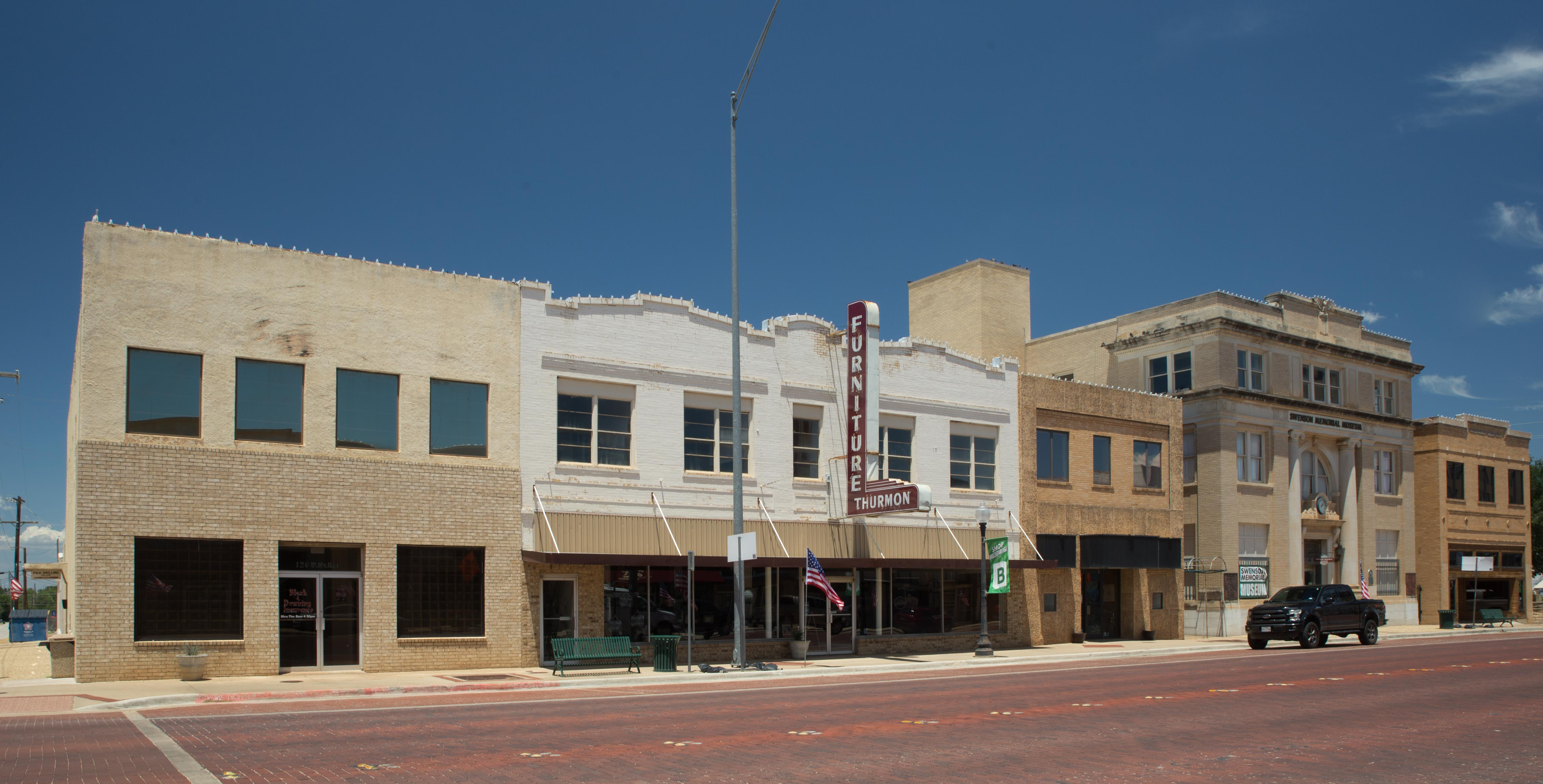
- Interactive map of Breckenridge, Texas
- Coordinates: 32°45′24″N 98°54′20″W
- Country: United States
- State: Texas
- County: Stephens

Area
  - Total: 4.20 sq mi (10.88 km^{2})
  - Land: 4.20 sq mi (10.87 km^{2})
  - Water: 0.0039 sq mi (0.01 km^{2})
- Elevation: 1,204 ft (367 m)

Population (2020)
  - Total: 5,187
  - Density: 1,236/sq mi (477.2/km^{2})
- Time zone: UTC-6 (Central (CST))
  - Summer (DST): UTC-5 (CDT)
- ZIP code: 76424
- Area code: 254
- FIPS code: 48-10132
- GNIS feature ID: 1372709
- Website: breckenridgetx.gov

Breckenridge is a city and county seat of Stephens County, Texas, Texas, United States. The estimated population was 5,349 as of February 2021.

Breckenridge was a stop on the since defunct Wichita Falls and Southern Railroad, one of the properties of Frank Kell and Joseph A. Kemp of Wichita Falls, Texas. The line was thereafter operated until 1969 by the Chicago, Rock Island and Pacific Railroad.

== History ==
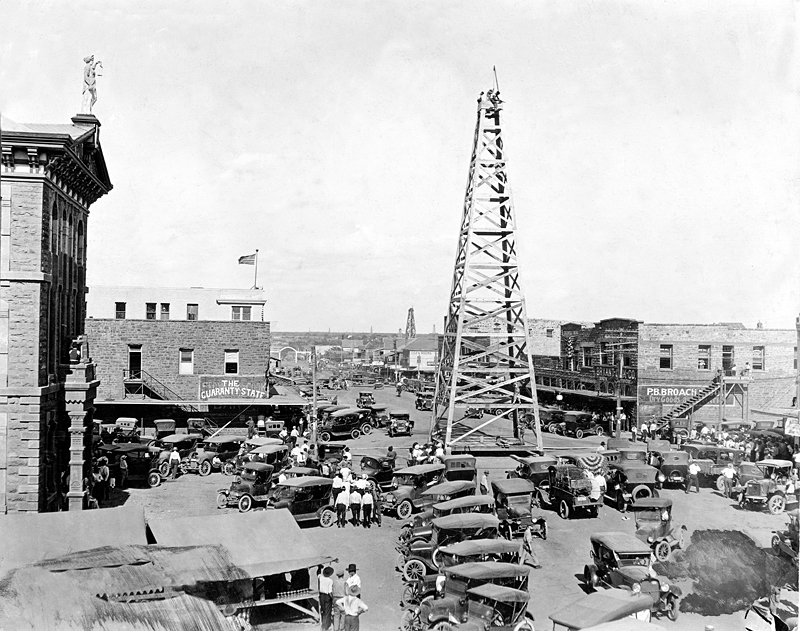
Oil rig, Main Street, Breckenridge, Texas, 1920

The town of Breckenridge originated in 1854 as Picketville, either named after the structure of its early homes or after rancher Bill Pickett, who lived in the area at the time. In 1876, Stephens County was established, and its territory included Picketville. The town was renamed "Breckenridge" after former U.S. Vice President and Confederate Army General John C. Breckinridge, though with an altered spelling.

Breckenridge was a major oil producer in the early 1920s. The population jumped from around 1000 to 5000 in under five years. Briefly, it was the home of legendary figure of the Old West, John "Doc" Holliday. Breckenridge's boomtown era was well documented by the hundreds of photographs of pioneer photographer Basil Clemons.

== Geography ==
According to the United States Census Bureau, the city has a total area of 4.2 sq mi (10.8 km^{2}), of which 0.24% is covered by water.

=== Climate ===
The climate in this area is characterized by hot, humid summers and generally mild to cool winters. According to the Köppen climate classification, Breckenridge has a humid subtropical climate, Cfa on climate maps.

Around 5:20 pm local time on April 9, 2008, three tornadoes, including two "sisters", were confirmed to have hit at least a portion of the town. Within the city limits, 15 citizens were reported as injured. Five buildings were destroyed, including the airport, which was a former Air Force training facility.

Climate data for Breckenridge, Texas, 1991–2020 normals, extremes 1898–present
Month	Jan	Feb	Mar	Apr	May	Jun	Jul	Aug	Sep	Oct	Nov	Dec	Year
Record high °F (°C)	90 (32)	97 (36)	98 (37)	101 (38)	109 (43)	111 (44)	112 (44)	114 (46)	111 (44)	105 (41)	93 (34)	90 (32)	114 (46)
Mean maximum °F (°C)	80.0 (26.7)	84.2 (29.0)	89.0 (31.7)	93.8 (34.3)	97.8 (36.6)	100.3 (37.9)	103.8 (39.9)	103.5 (39.7)	99.8 (37.7)	93.3 (34.1)	85.4 (29.7)	79.6 (26.4)	105.8 (41.0)
Mean daily maximum °F (°C)	57.4 (14.1)	61.4 (16.3)	69.6 (20.9)	78.0 (25.6)	84.7 (29.3)	91.7 (33.2)	96.0 (35.6)	95.9 (35.5)	88.5 (31.4)	79.0 (26.1)	67.4 (19.7)	58.8 (14.9)	77.4 (25.2)
Daily mean °F (°C)	42.8 (6.0)	47.0 (8.3)	55.1 (12.8)	63.4 (17.4)	72.0 (22.2)	79.8 (26.6)	83.6 (28.7)	83.1 (28.4)	75.5 (24.2)	64.9 (18.3)	52.9 (11.6)	44.6 (7.0)	63.7 (17.6)
Mean daily minimum °F (°C)	28.2 (−2.1)	32.5 (0.3)	40.6 (4.8)	48.9 (9.4)	59.3 (15.2)	67.9 (19.9)	71.2 (21.8)	70.2 (21.2)	62.4 (16.9)	50.8 (10.4)	38.4 (3.6)	30.4 (−0.9)	50.1 (10.0)
Mean minimum °F (°C)	14.7 (−9.6)	17.9 (−7.8)	23.2 (−4.9)	32.3 (0.2)	42.9 (6.1)	57.7 (14.3)	64.0 (17.8)	61.7 (16.5)	47.9 (8.8)	34.0 (1.1)	23.0 (−5.0)	15.9 (−8.9)	11.4 (−11.4)
Record low °F (°C)	−6 (−21)	−8 (−22)	7 (−14)	24 (−4)	33 (1)	46 (8)	51 (11)	51 (11)	38 (3)	20 (−7)	14 (−10)	−7 (−22)	−8 (−22)
Average precipitation inches (mm)	1.57 (40)	1.89 (48)	2.35 (60)	2.33 (59)	3.92 (100)	3.68 (93)	2.25 (57)	2.53 (64)	2.64 (67)	2.88 (73)	1.88 (48)	1.78 (45)	29.70 (754)
Average snowfall inches (cm)	0.2 (0.51)	0.1 (0.25)	0.3 (0.76)	0.5 (1.3)	0.0 (0.0)	0.0 (0.0)	0.0 (0.0)	0.0 (0.0)	0.0 (0.0)	0.0 (0.0)	0.1 (0.25)	0.4 (1.0)	1.6 (4.07)
Average precipitation days (≥ 0.01 in)	4.7	5.6	7.0	5.1	8.0	7.2	4.6	5.9	5.8	6.6	5.3	5.4	71.2
Average snowy days (≥ 0.1 in)	0.1	0.2	0.1	0.1	0.0	0.0	0.0	0.0	0.0	0.0	0.1	0.2	0.8
Source 1: NOAA
Source 2: National Weather Service

== Demographics ==
Historical population
Census	Pop.	Note	%±
1880	497		—
1890	462		−7.0%
1920	1,846		—
1930	7,569		310.0%
1940	5,826		−23.0%
1950	6,610		13.5%
1960	6,273		−5.1%
1970	5,944		−5.2%
1980	6,921		16.4%
1990	5,665		−18.1%
2000	5,868		3.6%
2010	5,780		−1.5%
2020	5,187		−10.3%
U.S. Decennial Census

=== 2020 census ===
Breckenridge racial composition (NH = Non-Hispanic) (Note: Note: the US Census treats Hispanic/Latino as an ethnic category. This table excludes Latinos from the racial categories and assigns them to a separate category. Hispanics/Latinos can be of any race.)
Race	Number	Percentage
White (NH)	3,123	60.21%
Black or African American (NH)	89	1.72%
Native American or Alaska Native (NH)	19	0.37%
Asian (NH)	49	0.94%
Pacific Islander (NH)	1	0.02%
Some Other Race (NH)	21	0.4%
Mixed/Multi-Racial (NH)	160	3.08%
Hispanic or Latino	1,725	33.26%
Total	5,187	

As of the 2020 census, Breckenridge had a population of 5,187, with 2,045 households and 1,267 families; the median age was 36.4 years, 27.5% of residents were under the age of 18, and 16.6% of residents were 65 years of age or older. For every 100 females there were 94.9 males, and for every 100 females age 18 and over there were 90.3 males age 18 and over.

99.7% of residents lived in urban areas, while 0.3% lived in rural areas.

Of the 2,045 households in Breckenridge, 35.6% had children under the age of 18 living in them. Of all households, 42.4% were married-couple households, 17.8% were households with a male householder and no spouse or partner present, and 32.2% were households with a female householder and no spouse or partner present. About 29.4% of all households were made up of individuals and 14.8% had someone living alone who was 65 years of age or older.

There were 2,517 housing units, of which 18.8% were vacant. Among occupied housing units, 63.4% were owner-occupied and 36.6% were renter-occupied. The homeowner vacancy rate was 4.1% and the rental vacancy rate was 17.6%.

Racial composition as of the 2020 census
Race	Percent
White	72.4%
Black or African American	1.8%
American Indian and Alaska Native	0.8%
Asian	0.9%
Native Hawaiian and Other Pacific Islander	<0.1%
Some other race	12.6%
Two or more races	11.4%
Hispanic or Latino (of any race)	33.3%

=== 2000 census ===
As of the census of 2000, 5,868 people, 2,274 households, and 1,546 families were residing in the city. The population density was 1,412.8 people/sq mi (545.9/km^{2}). The 2,776 housing units had an average density of 668.4 per square mile (258.1/km^{2}). The racial makeup of the city was 83.88% White, 0.34% Native American, 0.46% Asian, 11.35% from other races, and 1.76% from two or more races. Hispanics or Latinos of any race were 20.64% of the population.

Of the 2,274 households, 36.5% had children under 18 living with them, 51.1% were married couples living together, 12.6% had a female householder with no husband present, and 32.0% were not families. About 29.2% of all households were made up of individuals, and 14.8% had someone living alone who was 65 or over. The average household size was 2.55, and the average family size was 3.16.

In the city, the age distribution was 30.2% under 18, 8.5% from 18 to 24, 26.0% from 25 to 44, 20.0% from 45 to 64, and 15.3% who were 65 or older. The median age was 34 years. For every 100 females, there were 89.7 males. For every 100 females age 18 and over, there were 84.3 males.

The median income for a household in the city was $28,697, and for a family was $35,164. Males had a median income of $25,923 versus $20,467 for females. The per capita income for the city was $14,014. About 16.9% of families and 19.3% of the population were below the poverty line, including 26.9% of those under age 18 and 14.4% of those age 65 or over.

== Education ==
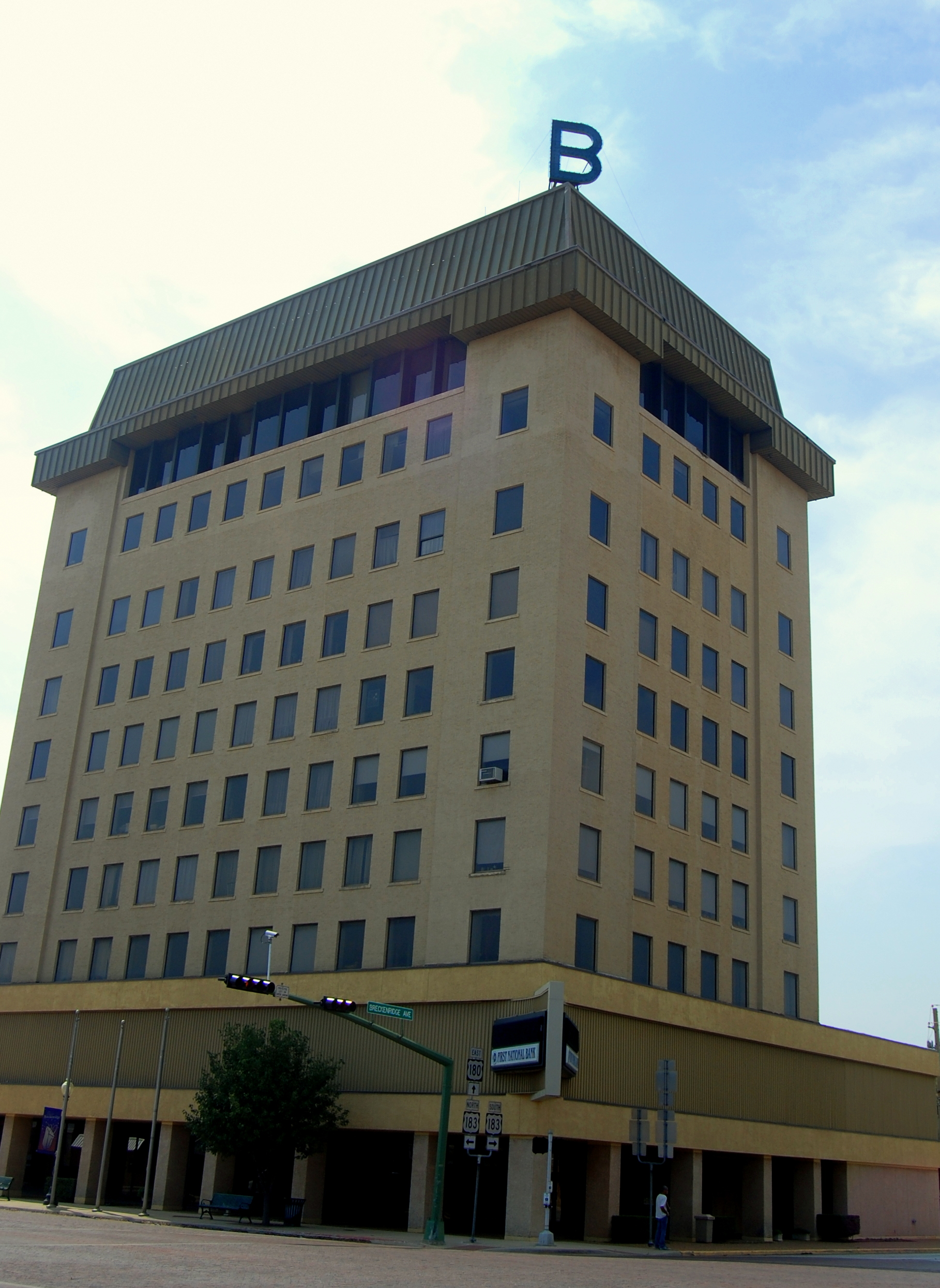
Burch Hotel in downtown Breckenridge

The City of Breckenridge is served by the Breckenridge Independent School District.

Breckenridge High School's mascot is a Buckaroo (a cowboy riding a bucking horse). The junior high school's mascot is a Bronco. The school colors are green and white. The Breckenridge High School football team of 1958, coached by Emory Bellard, was voted the Ft. Worth Star Telegram team of the century. The Buckaroos are undefeated in six Class 3A State Football Championships, winning four times in 1951, 1952, 1954, and 1958 with ties in 1929 and 1959. Breckenridge High School has also produced girls tennis state champions, girls golf state champions, FFA and 4-H state and national champions, and academic state champions over the past few decades.

In 2011, the U.S. Department of Education recognized Breckenridge Junior High School as a National Blue Ribbon School.

Breckenridge is also the home of a West Texas campus of the Texas State Technical College System. Environmental science technology, construction management technology, computer-aided drafting and design, digital imaging and design, software and business accounting, associate degree nursing, chemical-dependency counseling, and health-information technology are some of the courses offered at the Breckenridge TSTC campus. TSTC partners with BHS and other Texas high schools to offer dual-credit courses.

== Notable people ==
- Paul Campbell, NFL football player for the Philadelphia Eagles
- Spot Collins, NFL football player for the Boston Yanks
- Jack Cox, politician
- Joe Crousen, college football player and coach
- John Hill, politician
- Emil Hurja, newspaper editor and political consultant
- Michael Jenkins, sportscaster
- Byron Katie, speaker and author
- Paul Lea, physician and NFL football player
- Stephen McNallen, new religious movement proponent and white nationalist activist
- Jim Montgomery, NFL player for the Detroit Lions
- Gene Offield, football player and coach
- Derrell Palmer, NFL player for the Cleveland Browns
- Don Robbins, football coach
- Kathleen Sloan, violinist
- Dean Smith, Olympic track and field athlete and stuntman
- Shane Stockton, county musician
- Gerald M. "Jerry" Tubbs, NFL player for the Dallas Cowboys
- Pamela Willeford, diplomat

== Gallery ==
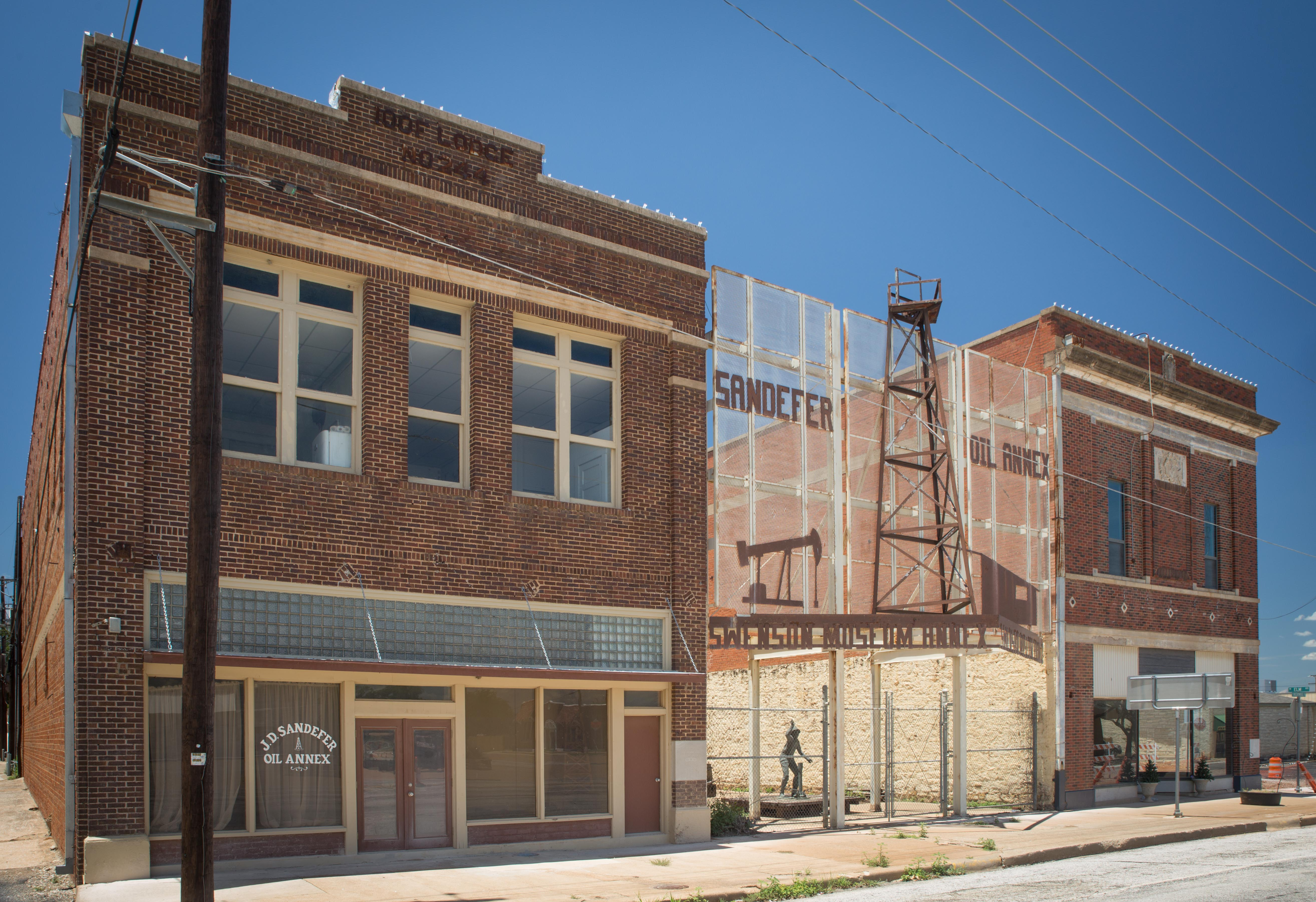
IOOF Lodge and AF and AM Building

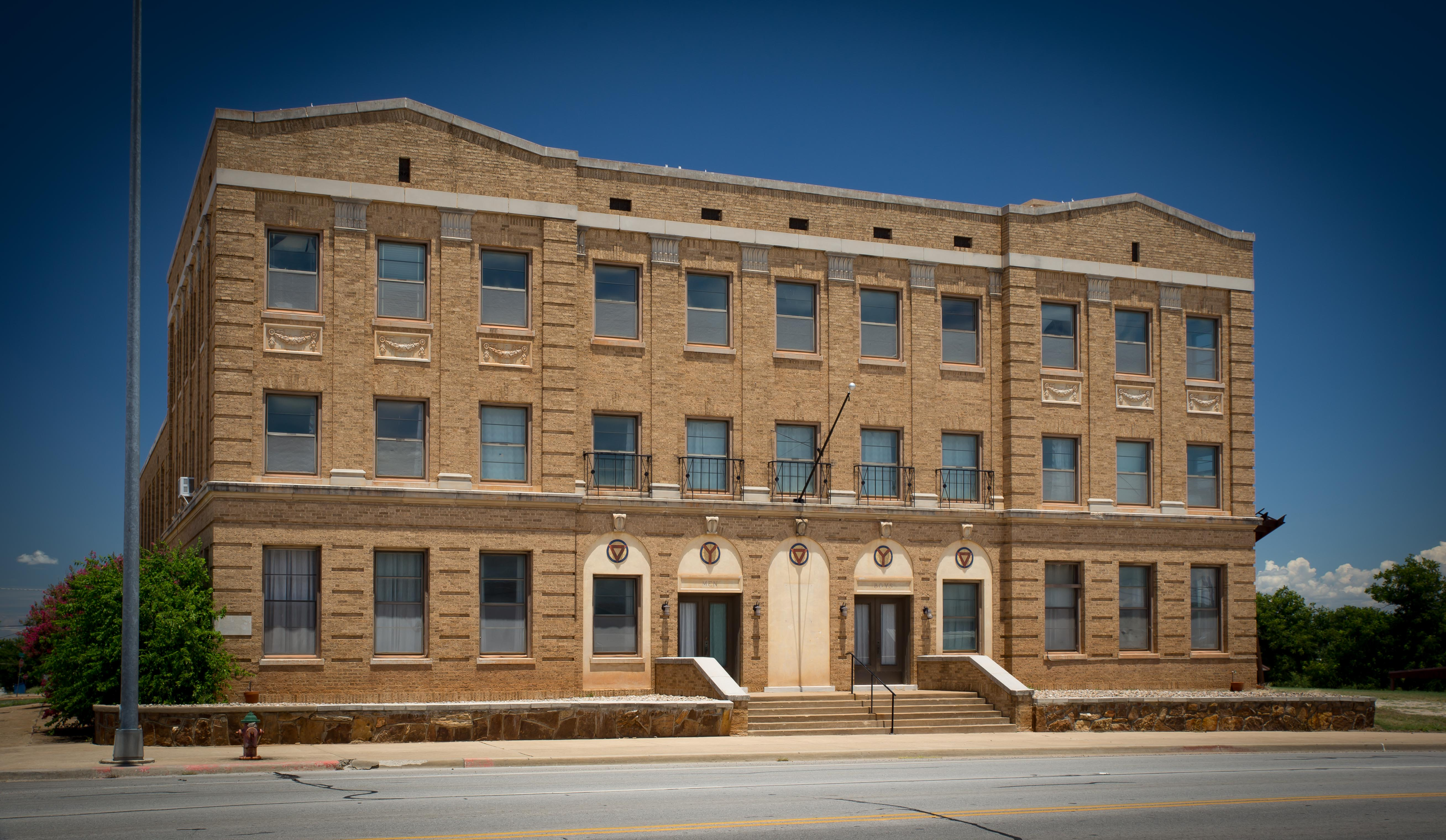
YWCA Building

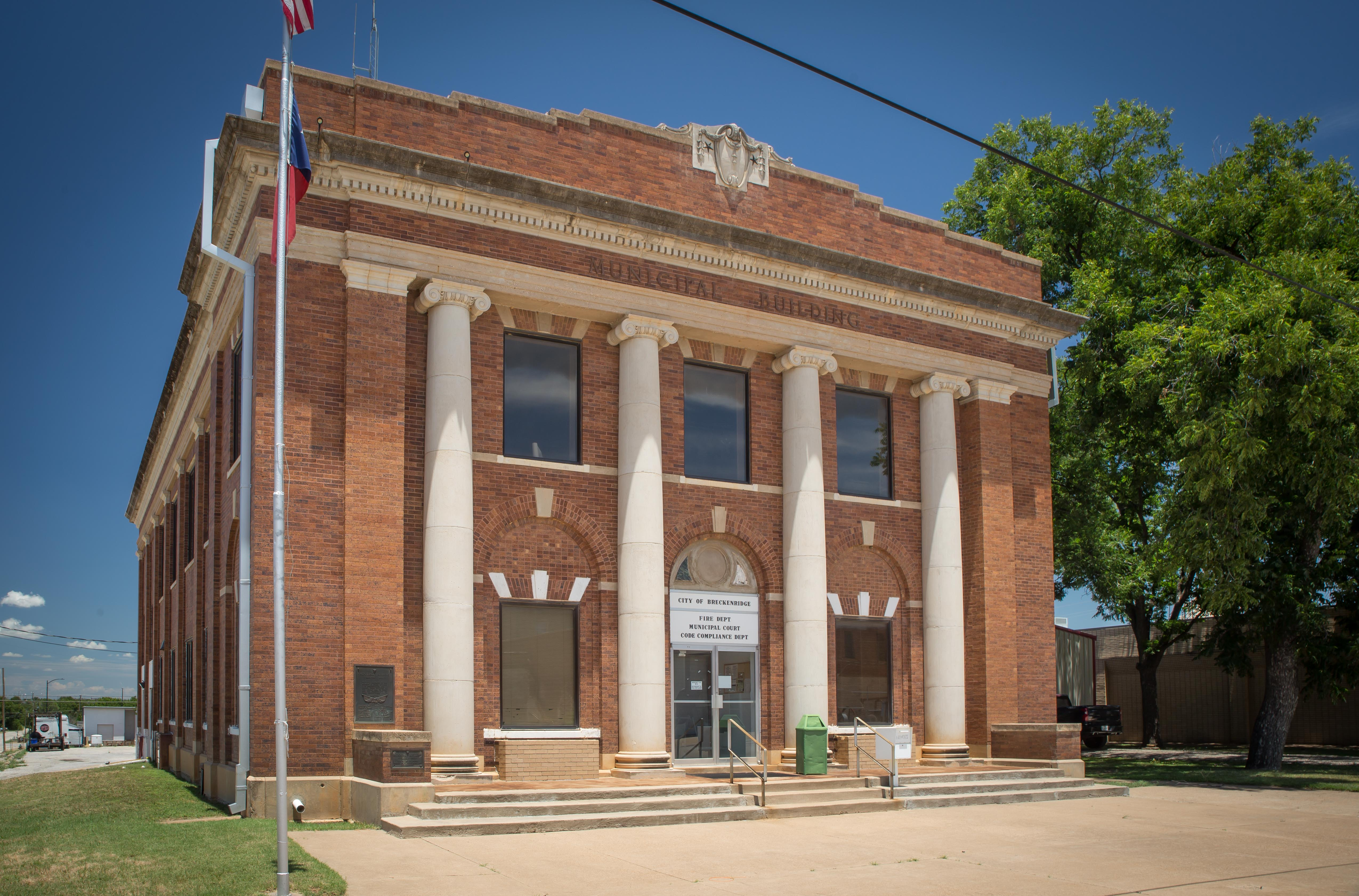
Municipal Building

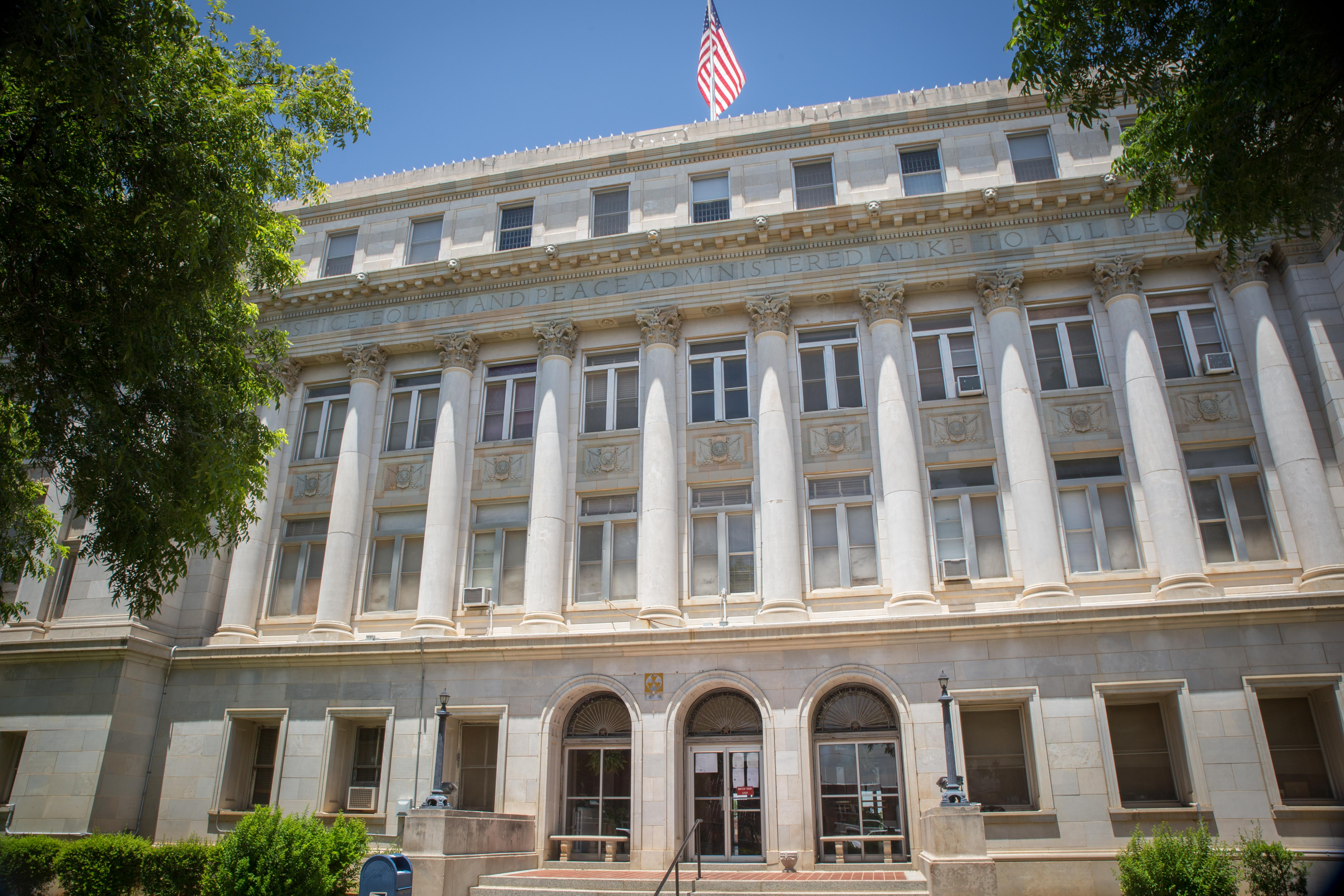
Stephens County Courthouse

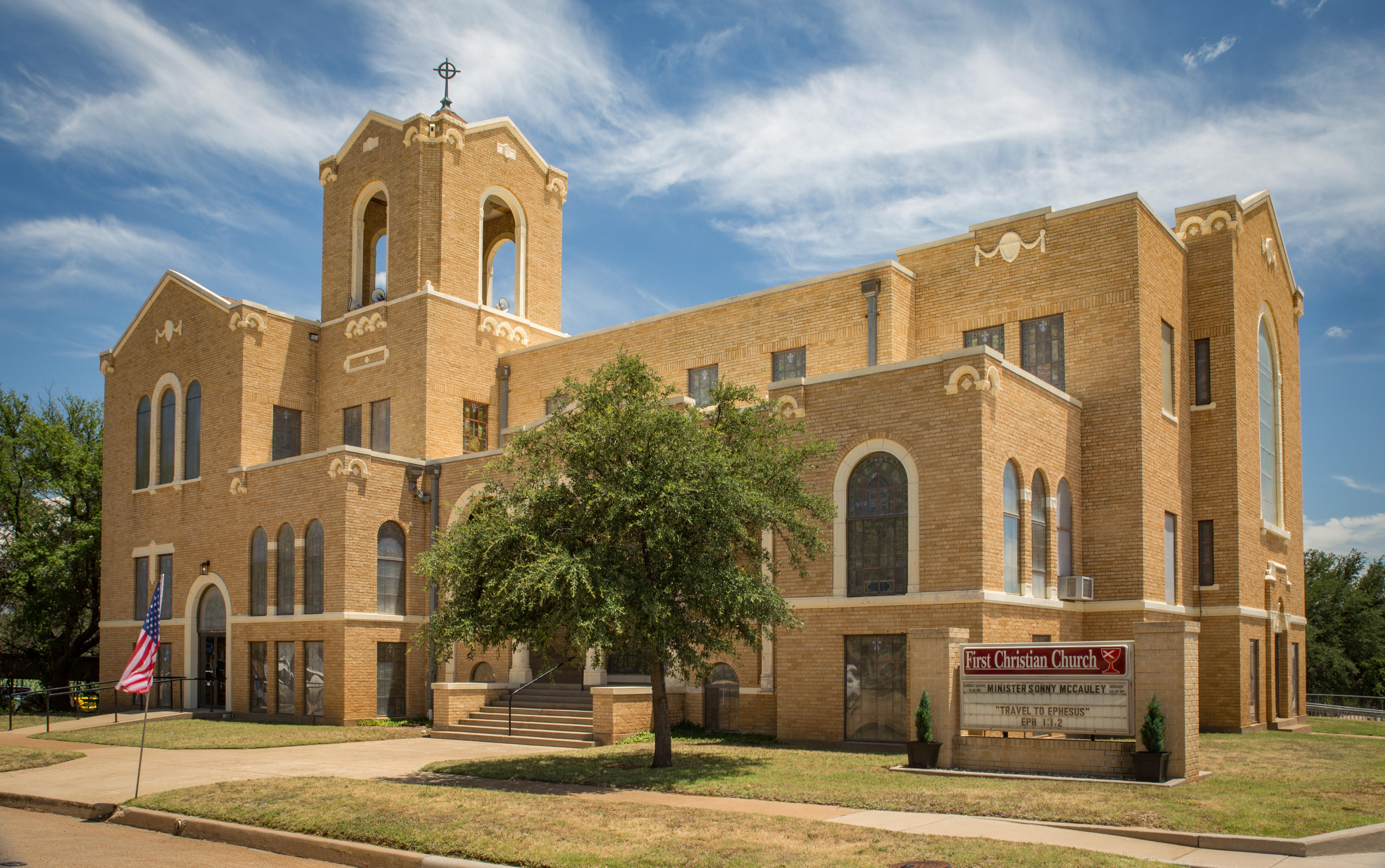
First Christian Church

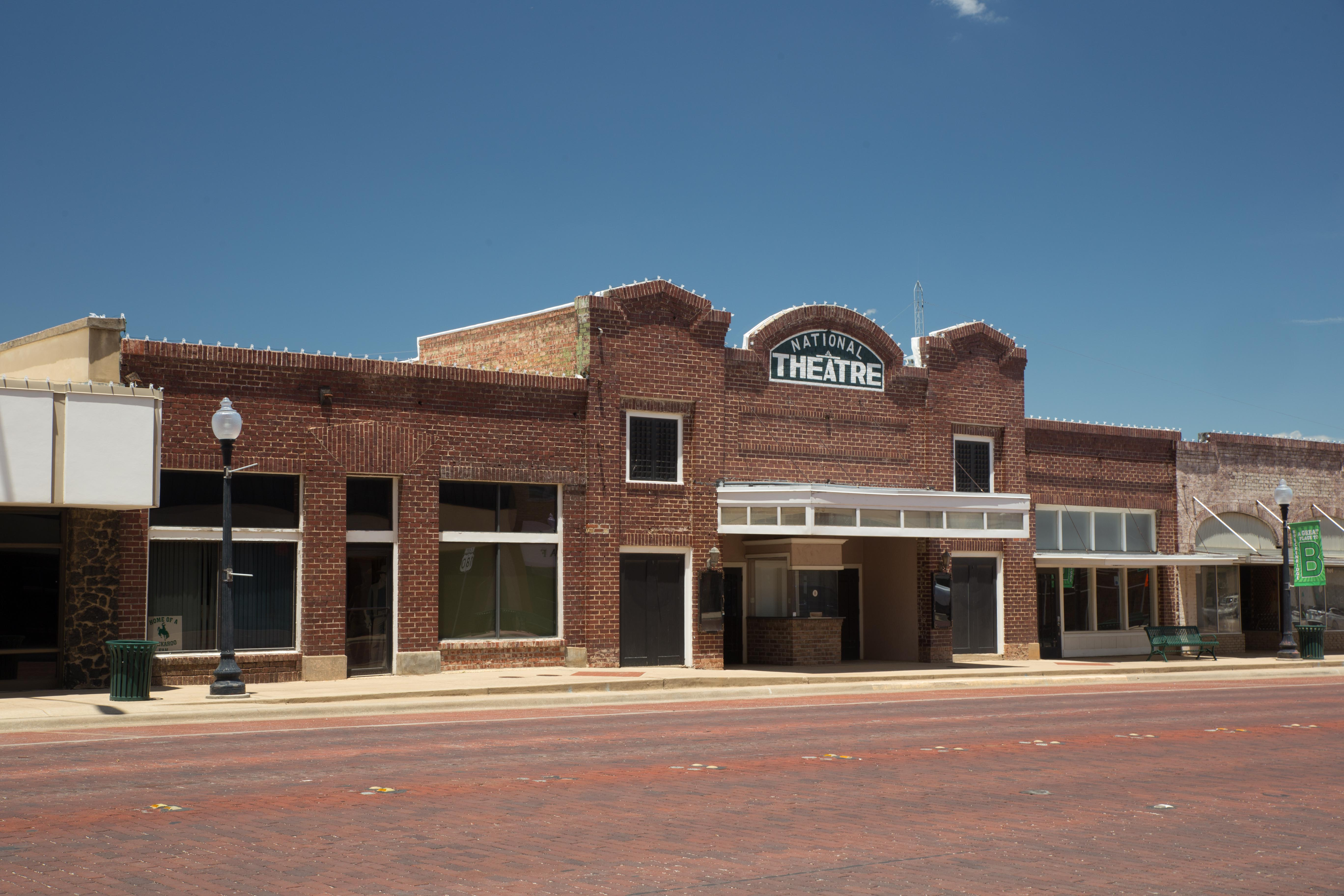
National Theater

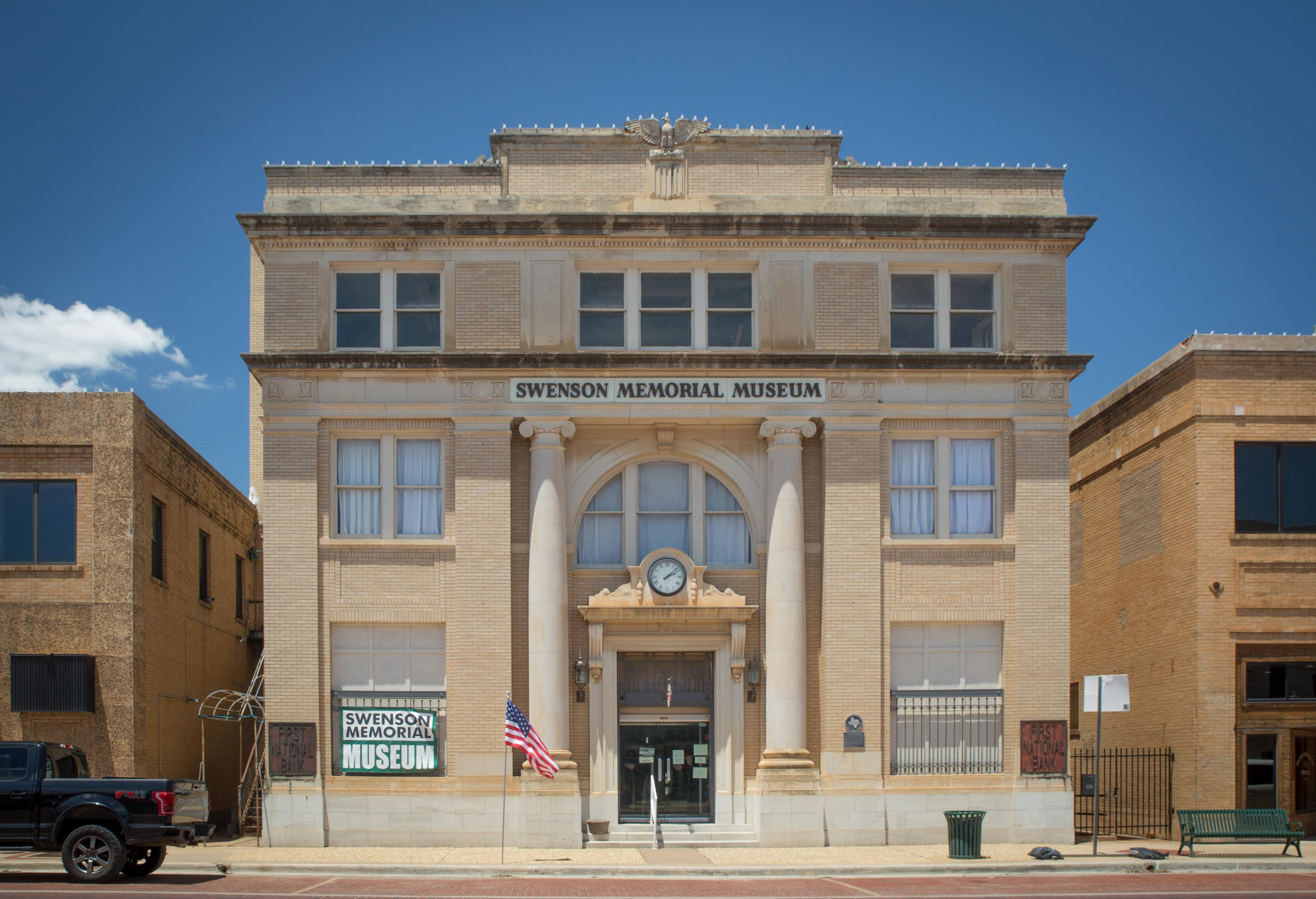
Swenson Museum
