= Poly Wells Field =

Stadium in Abilene, Texas

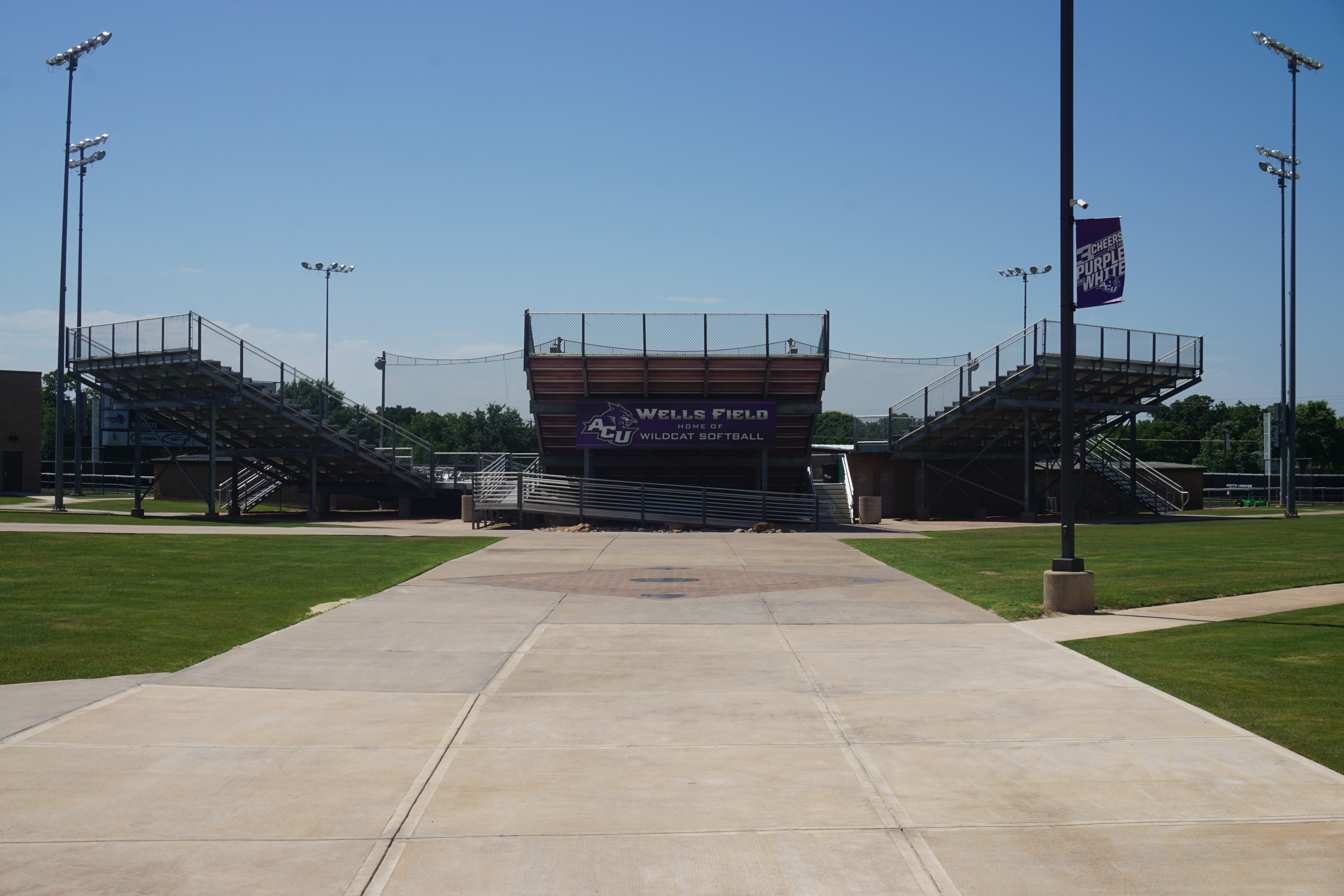
- Interactive map of Poly Wells Field
- Full name: A.E. (Poly) and Zieta Wells Field
- Location: East Ambler Avenue and Campus Court, Abilene, Texas
- Coordinates: 32°28′25.7″N 99°42′37.9″W
- Owner: Abilene Christian University
- Operator: Abilene Christian University
- Seating type: Bleacher seats
- Capacity: 1,000
- Surface: AstroTurf
- Scoreboard: Electronic
- Field size: Left Field: 186 ft Left Center: 208 ft Center Field: 215 ft Right Center: 210 ft Right Field: 190 ft (Estimated)

Construction
- Opened: February 22, 1997

Tenant
- Abilene Christian Wildcats softball (NCAA) (1996-Present)

Poly Wells Field is the home stadium for the Division I (NCAA) Abilene Christian Wildcats softball team. The stadium is located on the campus of Abilene Christian University in Abilene, Texas. Amenities include bleacher seating for 1,000 fans; field lighting; an electronic scoreboard; dugouts; batting cages outside of the right field line; restrooms; and locker rooms. The entire playing surface was changed from natural grass to AstroTurf in 2015–16. Brown turf was installed in the infield, and green turf was installed in the outfield. The dugout surfaces were raised to field level prior to the AstroTurf installation.

The full name of the stadium is A.E. (Poly) and Zieta Wells Field in honor of an estate donation made by Zieta Wells. Official stadium dedication was held on March 29, 1997. The initial home game was played on February 22, 1997 against Texas Wesleyan.

The stadium was the home of the 2009 Lone Star Conference softball tournament.

== Yearly Attendance ==
Below is the Wildcats' home attendance at Poly-Wells Field since the 2010 season.

Season	Average	High
Yearly Home Attendance
2015	272	411
2014	383	551
2013	229	413
2012	111	158
2011	164	321
2010	142	300

As of the 2014–15 season.
