= Eck Curtis =

American football player and coach (1902–1978)

Biographical details
- Born: August 8, 1902; Texas
- Died: June 28, 1978 (aged 75); Abilene, Texas

Playing career
- 1923: Abilene Christian
- Position: Quarterback

Coaching career (HC unless noted)
- 1925–1927: Anson HS
- 1928–1933: Ranger HS
- 1934: Electra HS
- 1935–1944: Breckenridge HS
- 1945: Highland Park HS
- 1946–1954: Texas (Asst.)

Head coaching record
- Overall: 168–47–14

Accomplishments and honors

Championships
- 1945 Texas state championship

Eck Curtis (August 8, 1902 – June 28, 1978) was an American football coach. After a 20-year coaching career he became an assistant at the University of Texas at Austin, and is credited for introducing the T formation to Longhorns football.

Curtis prepped at Vernon High School and went on to attend Abilene Christian University, where he played quarterback for coach Victor Payne. In 1925 he got his first head coaching job at Anson High School, where he remained for three seasons. He then spent six seasons at Ranger High School and single season at Electra High School, before he became head coach at Breckenridge High School, which had been a powerhouse in West Texas under P. E. Shotwell. Curtis' 1942 Breckenridge squad made the state semifinals. His overall record with the Buckaroos was 83–22–6.

In 1945, Curtis succeeded Rusty Russell as head coach at Highland Park High School in Dallas, Texas. He guided the Scots to a 12–0–2 record and the state co-championship with Waco. The 7–7 tie in the finals attracted a then record high school crowd of 45,790 into the Cotton Bowl. After the season, Curtis was hired by Texas assistant Blair Cherry to coach the freshmen varsity. There he introduced the T formation to Texas Longhorn football, which was later adopted when Cherry took over as Longhorns head coach. Cherry assigned Curtis to be his offensive backfield coach, a position in which Curtis remained until 1954.

In 1985, Curtis was inducted to the Texas Sports Hall of Fame.
