= Breckenridge Independent School District =

School district in Texas

Location
- 208 N. Miller; Breckenridge, Texas ESC Region 14 USA
- Coordinates: 32°45′25″N 98°54′26″W

District information
- Type: Independent school district
- Grades: Pre-K through 12
- Superintendent: Bryan Allen
- Schools: 6 (2009-10)
- NCES District ID: 4811220

Students and staff
- Students: 1,561 (2010-11)
- Teachers: 136.87 (2009-10) (on full-time equivalent (FTE) basis)
- Student–teacher ratio: 11.55 (2009-10)
- Athletic conference: UIL Class 3A Football Division I
- District mascot: Buckaroos
- Colors: Green, White

Other information
- TEA District Accountability Rating for 2011-12: Recognized
- Website: Breckenridge ISD

Breckenridge Independent School District is a public school district based in Breckenridge, Texas (USA).

== Finances ==
As of the 2010–2011 school year, the appraised valuation of property in the district was $850,849,000. The maintenance tax rate was $0.104 and the bond tax rate was $0.008 per $100 of appraised valuation.

== Academic achievement ==
In 2011, the school district was rated "recognized" by the Texas Education Agency. Thirty-five percent of districts in Texas in 2011 received the same rating. No state accountability ratings will be given to districts in 2012. A school district in Texas can receive one of four possible rankings from the Texas Education Agency: Exemplary (the highest possible ranking), Recognized, Academically Acceptable, and Academically Unacceptable (the lowest possible ranking).

Historical district TEA accountability ratings

- 2011: Recognized
- 2010: Academically Acceptable
- 2009: Academically Acceptable
- 2008: Academically Acceptable
- 2007: Academically Acceptable
- 2006: Academically Acceptable
- 2005: Academically Acceptable
- 2004: Academically Acceptable

== Schools ==
In the 2011–2012 school year, the district operated five schools.

- Breckenridge High School (Grades 9-12)
- Breckenridge Junior High School (Grades 6-8)
- South Elementary School (Grades 3-5)
- East Elementary School (Grades PK-2)

== Special programs ==
=== Athletics ===
Breckenridge High School participates in the boys sports of baseball, basketball, football, and wrestling. The school participates in the girls sports of basketball, softball, and volleyball. For the 2012 through 2014 school years, Breckenridge High School will play football in UIL Class 2A Division I.

== See also ==
- List of school districts in Texas
- List of high schools in Texas
