= P. E. Shotwell =

American football coach

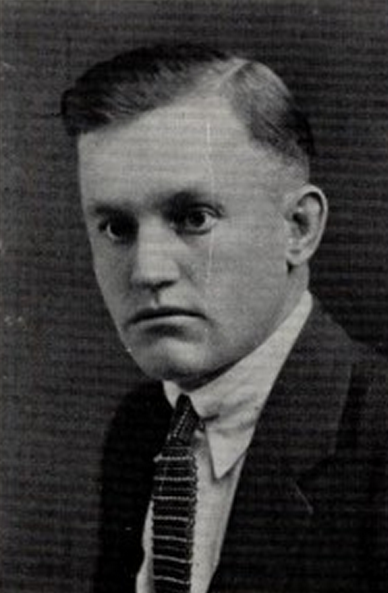
- Shotwell pictured in The Bronco 1925, Hardin-Simmons yearbook

Biographical details
- Born: August 17, 1893; Canyon, Texas, U.S.
- Died: February 8, 1978 (aged 84); Abilene, Texas, U.S.

Coaching career (HC unless noted)

Football
- 1916–1917: Cisco HS (TX)
- 1918–1923: Abilene HS (TX)
- 1924–1925: Simmons (TX)
- 1926: Sul Ross
- 1927–1934: Breckenridge HS (TX)
- 1935–1945: Longview HS (TX)
- 1946–1952: Abilene HS (TX)

Baseball
- 1925–1926: Simmons (TX)

Administrative career (AD unless noted)
- 1956–1969: McMurry

Head coaching record
- Overall: 14–10–1 (college football); 255–92–18 (high school football)

Accomplishments and honors

Awards
- National High School Hall of Fame (1971); Texas Sports Hall of Fame (1971)

Prince Elmer "Pete" Shotwell (August 17, 1893 – February 8, 1978) was an American football coach.

Shotwell was a 1916 graduate of Texas State University. He began coaching at Cisco High School in 1916 and later moved to Abilene High School. His 1923 Abilene Eagles team won all of its 12 games as well as the state championship in one of the strongest defense performances ever, allowing only one touchdown by an opponent during the whole season. After a short stint in the collegiate ranks at Hardin–Simmons University, Shotwell coached at Breckenridge High School, where he won a state championship in 1929. After winning another one at Longview High School in 1937 (one of only two in school history to date), he returned to Abilene, where he retired in 1952. His overall high school record stands 255–92–18. Shotwell also served as athletic director at McMurry College—now known as McMurry University–from 1956 to 1969.

Shotwell has been honored by the Texas Sports Writers Association, the Texas High School Coaches Association, the National Association of Intercollegiate Athletics and the Texas Sports Hall of Fame in 1971. The originally named "Public Schools Stadium", the 15,000+ seat venue built in 1959 that serves as home stadium for Abilene HS and Abilene Cooper HS, was renamed “Shotwell Stadium” in his honor.

== Head coaching record ==
=== College football ===
Year	Team	Overall	Conference	Standing	Bowl/playoffs
Simmons Cowboys (Texas Intercollegiate Athletic Association) (1924–1925)
1924	Simmons	2–6	2–4	T–8th	
1925	Simmons	7–2	6–1	2nd	
Simmons:		9–8	8–5		
Sul Ross Lobos (Independent) (1926)
1926	Sul Ross	5–2–1			
Sul Ross:		5–2–1			
Total:		14–10–1			
