= Jessie Armstead =

American football player (born 1970)

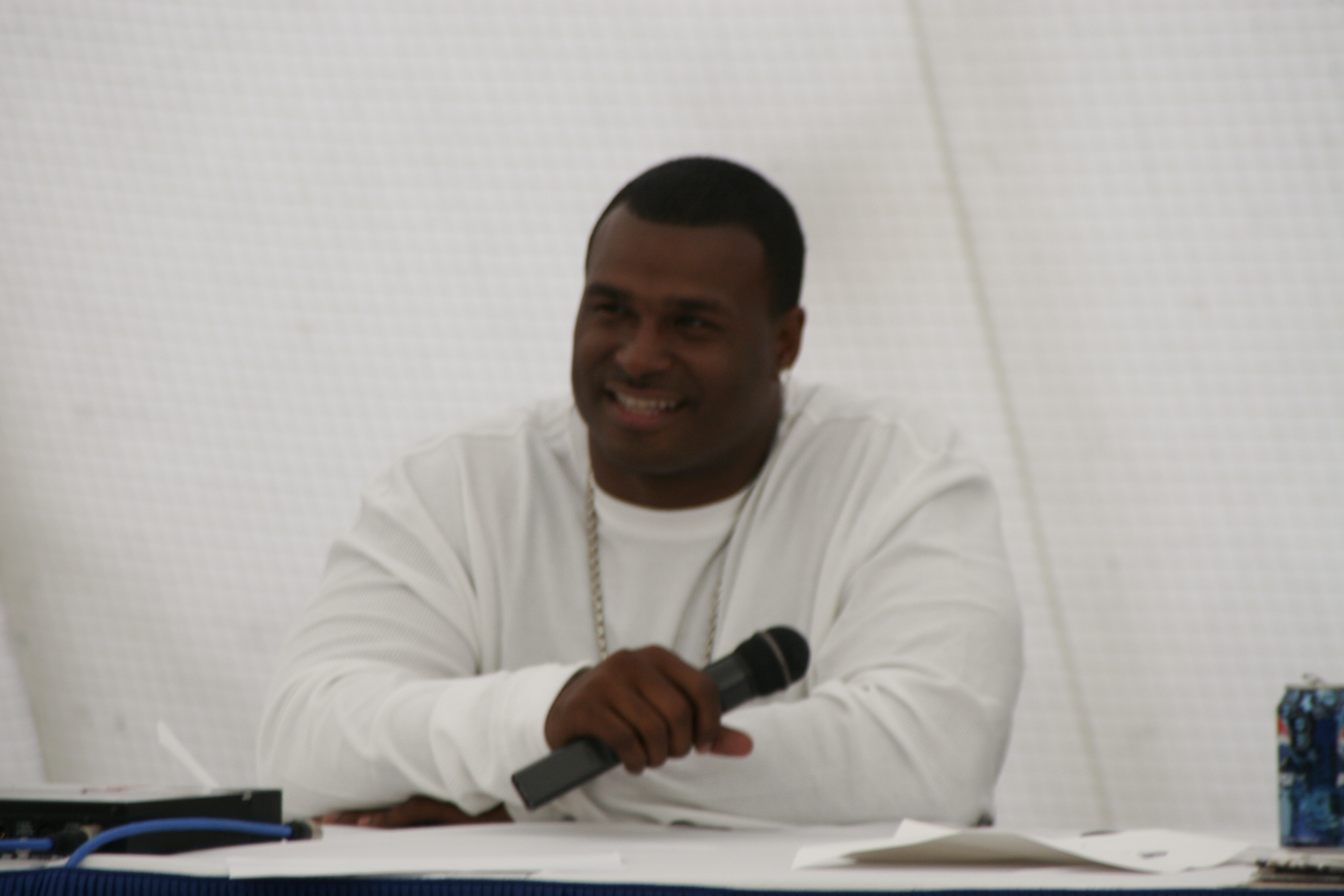
- Armstead in 2008

No. 98
- Position: Linebacker

Personal information
- Born: October 26, 1970 (age 56); Dallas, Texas, U.S.
- Listed height: 6 ft 1 in (1.85 m)
- Listed weight: 237 lb (108 kg)

Career information
- High school: Carter (Dallas)
- College: Miami (FL)
- NFL draft: 1993: 8th round, 207th overall pick

Career history
- New York Giants (1993–2001); Washington Redskins (2002–2003); Carolina Panthers (2004)*
- * Offseason or practice squad member only

Awards and highlights
- First-team All-Pro (1997); 2× Second-team All-Pro (1999, 2000); 5× Pro Bowl (1997–2001); PFWA All-Rookie Team (1993); New York Giants Ring of Honor; 34th greatest New York Giant of all-time; 2× National champion (1989, 1991)

Career NFL statistics
- Tackles: 971
- Sacks: 40
- Forced fumbles: 13
- Fumble recoveries: 9
- Interceptions: 12
- Defensive touchdowns: 2
- Stats at Pro Football Reference

Jessie Willard Armstead (born October 26, 1970) is an American former professional football player who was a linebacker for 11 seasons in the National Football League (NFL) with the New York Giants and the Washington Redskins between 1993 and 2003. He was a three-time All-Pro and five-time Pro Bowl selection. He played college football at the University of Miami.

== Early life ==
Armstead attended David W. Carter High School in Dallas, Texas, where he was coached by Freddie James. Armstead was part of a highly talented team that featured four other future NFL players—Clifton Abraham, Joe Burch, Le'Shai Maston, Darius Smith—and won the 1988 5A state championship (which was later stripped by UIL in 1991 due to eligibility infringements), defeating Permian High School in the state semi-final game, which was portrayed as the state championship game in the 2004 film Friday Night Lights and the 2017 ESPN 30 for 30 documentary "What Carter Lost" as well as the 2015 film Carter High.

Armstead was considered the top high school football talent in Texas as well as nationwide by recruiting analysts. He had been an All-American since his sophomore year, and at that time was the only player to be selected as an All-American three years in high school.

Fellow D-I recruits Derric Evans and Gary Edwards asked Armstead to join them and others in a series of robberies of video stores and fast-food restaurants, but he refused. In September 1989, Evans and Edwards were sentenced to 20 years and 16 years, respectively, in prison.

== College career ==
Recruited by Jimmy Johnson, Armstead chose to attend the University of Miami. However, weeks later, Johnson left Miami to take over as the head coach of the Dallas Cowboys. After initial reports that Armstead might seek to be released from his commitment to Miami, since the coach who recruited him to play there had departed, Armstead chose to honor his commitment after Dennis Erickson was named head coach.

A college standout on 2 of Miami's 5 national championship teams (1989, 1991), Armstead's pro prospects were diminished after he tore his anterior cruciate ligament his sophomore season. As a result, he was not drafted until the eighth round of the 1993 NFL draft, when he was selected by the New York Giants.

Armstead was interviewed about his time at the University of Miami for the documentary The U, which premiered December 12, 2009 on ESPN.

== Professional career ==
Pre-draft measurables
Height	Weight	Arm length	Hand span	40-yard dash	10-yard split	20-yard split	20-yard shuttle	Vertical jump	Broad jump	Bench press
6 ft 1 1/2 in (1.87 m)	228 lb (103 kg)	32 3/8 in (0.82 m)	9 1/2 in (0.24 m)	4.64 s	1.64 s	2.73 s	4.01 s	37.0 in (0.94 m)	10 ft 2 in (3.10 m)	25 reps
All values from NFL Combine

Armstead was selected by the Giants in the eighth round of the 1993 NFL draft. Armstead was a five-time Pro Bowler, elected between 1997 and 2001. Armstead had 752 career tackles with forty sacks and 12 interceptions for 175 yards.

Following a nine-year career with the Giants, he was signed to a three-year, $10.5 million deal by the Washington Redskins, where he played for two additional seasons.

He signed with the Carolina Panthers for the 2004 season, but he retired that year following a pre-season injury.

On June 13, 2007, Armstead signed a one-day contract with the New York Giants to officially retire a New York Giant.

== Coaching career ==
On September 8, 2008, Armstead was hired by the Giants as a "special assistant / consultant." His responsibilities include special projects, defensive assignments, player development and free agent recruiting. In 2010, he was inducted into the New York Giants Ring of Honor. He also has a Super Bowl ring from their Super Bowl XLII win.

== Film and TV career ==
In February 2008, Armstead was featured as one of the pros on Pros vs Joes on Spike TV.
