= John Wilkins (disambiguation) =

John Wilkins (1614–1672) was an English clergyman, natural philosopher, author, founder of the Royal Society, and Bishop of Chester.

John Wilkins may also refer to:

- John Wilkins (basketball) (born 1989), Moroccan basketball player
- John Wilkins (Indian artist) (1927–1991)
- John Wilkins (American football), American football coach
- John Wilkins Jr. (1761–1816), quartermaster general of the United States Army
- John Wilkins (Salem witch trials) (1642–1723), accuser in the Salem witch trials
- John T. Wilkins III (1880–1929), American politician in the Virginia House of Delegates
- J. Ernest Wilkins Sr. (1894–1959), African-American lawyer, labor leader and undersecretary
- Reverend John Wilkins, son of Robert Wilkins
- John Wilkins (officer), commandant of the Illinois Country
- Jonathan Wilkins, English ballroom dancer and teacher

== See also ==
- Jack Wilkins (1944–2023), American jazz guitarist
- John Wilkins Whitfield (1818–1879), territorial delegate to the United States Congress representing the Kansas Territory
- John Wilkin (disambiguation)
