= Tricia Woodgett =

American film director

- Born: March 24, 1975 (age 50); Ft. McClellan, Anniston, Alabama, U.S
- Occupation(s): FilmCloud Founder, film producer, director, screenwriter, film distributor
- Years active: 2007–present
- Notable work: Circles

Tricia Woodgett (born March 24, 1975) is an American producer, director, film distributor and screenwriter. Her first feature film, Circles, was accepted to the Pan African Film Festival in 2013.

== Early life ==
Woodgett was born in Ft. McClellan, Anniston, Alabama, United States, to mother Debra Taylor and father Lee Taylor. She lived in Wichita, Kansas, and Oklahoma City, Oklahoma, before moving to Texas in 1985. She graduated from L.V. Berkner High School in Richardson, Texas in 1993 and obtained her MBA in Finance from Dallas Baptist University in 2010.

She has one brother and three sisters.

== Career ==
Woodgett became interested in filmmaking while running a book publishing company, where she felt inspired to adapt one of the books into a feature film.

=== Publisher ===
Woodgett operated her publishing company, Svelte Books, from 2007 to 2012, ultimately publishing nine titles. One of the books, Circles, would later be adapted into a feature film. Circles is about a group of HIV positive men and women whose lives intersect by their fatal choice to knowingly spread the virus as a means of revenge against those they believed had wronged them in some way.

=== Filmmaking ===
Intent on turning Circles into a feature film, Woodgett first produced short films before producing full-length films. Her first short film, Til Death Do Us Part, was completed for the 24-Hour Video Race in Dallas, TX, followed by a second short film, The Other Sister. Her first full-length film was Circles. She worked as executive producer, producer, and assistant director as well as other additional roles. The film went on to be accepted into the Pan African Film Festival in Los Angeles, California.

Woodgett began production on her next feature film, Lady Luck, in 2014. The film stars Irma P. Hall from Soul Food and Matrix co-star Don Battee. It tells the story of three strangers who are drawn together under one roof, each running from their own personal trials.

After Lady Luck, Woodgett was hired on as an associate producer on Carter High. The film was released nationally in October 2015, streaming on Netflix on November 14, 2016.

In 2014, Woodgett also produced the award-winning short films Things You Shouldn't Know About Me and Nothing at All.

== Film distribution ==
In 2016, Woodgett launched the multi-cultural film distribution platform FilmCloud. Woodgett also owns her own film production company, TigerEye Films LLC.

== Personal life ==
Woodgett resides in Dallas, Texas. She has one son and one daughter.

== Filmography ==
Year	Film	Role
2016	The Storyteller	Executive producer, line producer, producer
2016	Jerico	Producer
2016	Lady Luck	Producer, line producer
2015	Carter High	Associate producer
2014	Just Us	Producer
2014	Nothing at All	Executive Producer, producer
2014	Things You Shouldn't Know About Me	Producer
2013	Circles	Executive producer, producer
2011	The Other Sister	Co-producer

== Awards ==
In 2014, Woodgett's short film Nothing at All was one of the top 20 selections of the Louisiana Film Prize Film Festival.

Year	Award	Category	Work	Result
2014	People's Film Festival	Best Narrative Short	Things You Shouldn't Know About Me	Won
