= Robert Clark (photographer) =

American photographer

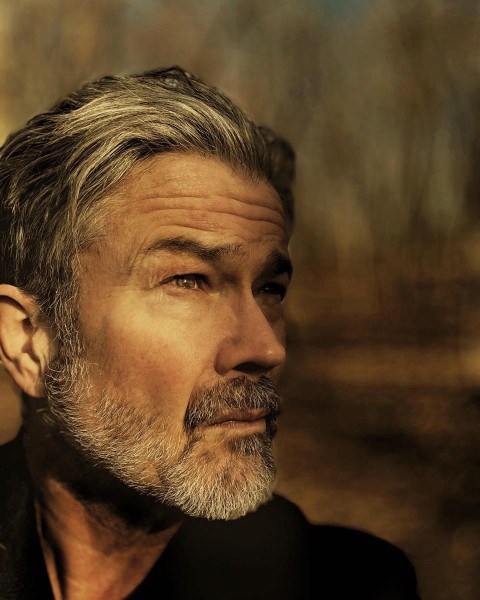
- Clark in 2025
- Born: 1961 (age 64–65); Hays, Kansas, U.S.
- Education: Kansas State University (photojournalism)
- Occupation: Photographer
- Years active: 1980s–present
- Known for: Friday Night Lights photographs, National Geographic contributor, September 11 attacks photography
- Website: robertclark.com

Robert Clark (born c. 1961) is an American photographer based in Brooklyn, New York. He is a longtime contributor to National Geographic, for which he has photographed stories on science and natural history subjects including evolution, feathered dinosaur fossils, and biomimetics. Earlier in his career, he photographed the Permian High School football team for Buzz Bissinger's book Friday Night Lights (1990). His photographs of the September 11 attacks, taken from his Brooklyn rooftop, received a World Press Photo award in 2002.

== Early life and education ==
Clark grew up in Hays, Kansas, where he received his first camera as a birthday gift from his older brother, who worked as the sports editor at The Hays Daily. His brother assigned him to photograph a high school basketball game, and Clark produced the lead photo for the sports page. Clark has spoken about struggling with dyslexia during his school years and finding his direction through photography. He graduated from Hays High School in 1979 and went on to study photojournalism at Kansas State University, where he was a classmate of Pete Souza, who later served as Chief Official White House Photographer for Presidents Reagan and Obama. He has cited fellow Kansan Rich Clarkson of The Topeka Capital-Journal and Sports Illustrated as an early inspiration.

== Career ==
After college, Clark worked as a newspaper photographer for seven years at The Ogden Standard-Examiner, The Cincinnati Post, and The Philadelphia Inquirer, where he worked under photo editor Gary Haynes alongside photographers including Larry Price and Sarah Leen. In 1988, he left newspaper work to join journalist H. G. "Buzz" Bissinger in Odessa, Texas, where he spent a season photographing the Permian High School football team for Bissinger's Friday Night Lights: A Town, a Team, and a Dream (1990). The book was later adapted as a 2004 film and an NBC television series (2006–2011). In 2021, Clark published Friday Night Lives (University of Texas Press), which paired previously unpublished photographs from the 1988 project with portraits of the same players decades later. The book was designed by D. J. Stout, formerly of Texas Monthly.

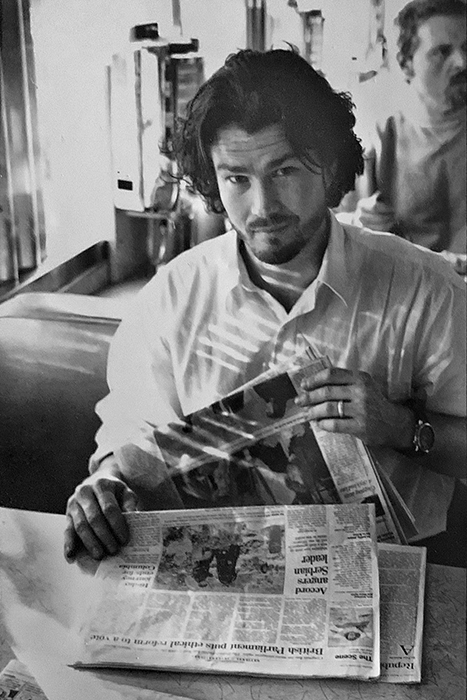
Clark in 1992

Clark moved to New York City in 1992 and began freelancing for publications including Time, Vanity Fair, Sports Illustrated, GEO, Stern, Der Spiegel, and Texas Monthly. His first assignment for National Geographic came in 1995, photographing the discovery of explorer Robert de La Salle's sunken ship in Texas and France. The assignment came through Tom Kennedy, then the magazine's director of photography, who had known Clark's work from his time at the Philadelphia Inquirer. Much of Clark's subsequent work for the magazine has focused on science and natural history, including stories on Charles Darwin and evolution ("Was Darwin Wrong?," November 2004), Alfred Russel Wallace, bog bodies, biomimetics, feathered dinosaur fossils in China, Ötzi the Iceman, the Phoenicians, taxidermy, and the domestication of dogs. He shot the magazine's first digital photographic cover in 2003. The "Was Darwin Wrong?" story shared the 2005 National Magazine Award for Best Essay and received a Picture of the Year award from the National Press Photographers Association. In 2017, Clark photographed a 110-million-year-old nodosaur fossil at the Royal Tyrrell Museum of Palaeontology in Alberta, Canada, for the magazine's June 2017 issue.

In 2003, Anne Wilkes Tucker of the Museum of Fine Arts, Houston commissioned Clark to document the inaugural season of the Houston Texans NFL franchise. The project was exhibited at the museum and published as First Down Houston: Birth of an NFL Franchise (2003); the museum holds photographs from the project in its permanent collection. Clark also served as principal photographer for First Lady Hillary Clinton's book An Invitation to the White House (2000), and in 2005 produced Image America, a book of photographs shot on a camera phone during a 45-day cross-country trip commissioned by Sony Ericsson. In 2016, Clark directed and photographed short films and commercials for sportswear brand Russell Athletic's "Settle Your Score" campaign, created with the Kansas City advertising agency Barkley, which documented six high school football teams that had narrowly lost state championship games and drew on his Friday Night Lights work. The campaign received a Gold award at the 2017 Clio Sports Awards.

On September 11, 2001, after seeing television coverage of the first plane striking the World Trade Center, Clark went to the roof of his apartment in the Williamsburg neighborhood of Brooklyn and photographed United Airlines Flight 175 approaching and crashing into the South Tower using a motor-driven camera. Time published the images as a double-page spread in its special edition on the attacks, and the Associated Press distributed them internationally. The four-image sequence received first prize in the Spot News category at the 2002 World Press Photo awards.

== Books ==
- Friday Night Lights: A Town, a Team, and a Dream (photographer; text by H. G. Bissinger, 1990)
- An Invitation to the White House (principal photographer; text by Hillary Clinton, 2000)
- First Down Houston: Birth of an NFL Franchise (photographer, 2003)
- Image America (photographer, 2005)
- The Camera Phone Book (photographer; text by Aimee Baldridge, National Geographic, 2007)
- Lost Gold of the Dark Ages: War, Treasure, and the Mystery of the Saxons (photographer; text by Caroline Alexander, National Geographic, 2011)
- Feathers: Displays of Brilliant Plumage (photographer, Chronicle Books, 2016)
- Evolution: A Visual Record (photographer; foreword by David Quammen, text by Joseph Wallace, Phaidon Press, 2016)
- Friday Night Lives (photographer, University of Texas Press, 2021)
