= Dallas Baptist University =

Private university in Dallas, Texas, US

Coordinates: 32.710°N 96.948°W

- Former names: Decatur Baptist College (1898–1965); Dallas Baptist College (1965–1985)
- Motto: Soli Deo gloria Glory to God alone
- Type: Private university
- Established: 1898
- Religious affiliation: Baptist General Convention of Texas
- Endowment: $41.7 million
- Chancellor: Gary Cook
- President: Adam Wright
- Provost: Norma Hedin
- Faculty: 124 (full-time)
- Students: 4,247
- Undergraduates: 2,874
- Postgraduates: 1,373
- Location: Dallas, Texas, United States
- Campus: 368 acres (1.49 km^{2}) main campus
- Colors: Red, white, blue
- Nickname: Patriots
- Sporting affiliations: Pac-12 Conference (NCAA Division I, baseball only); Lone Star Conference (NCAA Division II, all other sports)
- Website: dbu.edu
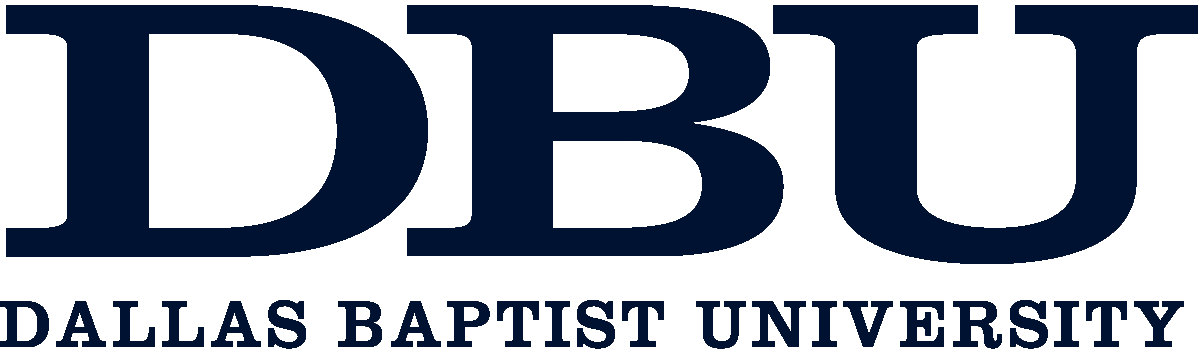

Dallas Baptist University (DBU) is a private Baptist university in Dallas, Texas, United States. Founded in 1898 as Decatur Baptist College, Dallas Baptist University currently operates campuses in Dallas, Plano, and Hurst. It is affiliated with the Baptist General Convention of Texas.

== History ==
DBU opened in Decatur, Texas in 1898 as Decatur Baptist College. The Baptist General Convention of Texas purchased the land in 1897 from Northwest Texas Baptist College. The school moved to Dallas in 1965 at the invitation of the Dallas Baptist Association (the local association of Southern Baptist churches), changing its name to Dallas Baptist College upon relocation.

The school's historic Administration Building in Decatur, built in 1893, is listed on the National Register of Historic Places. It was destroyed in a fire on March 18, 2023, after years of service as the Wise County Heritage Museum.

In October 1965, Dallas Baptist College began offering classes to its first class of over 900 students. The initial piece of land for the campus, overlooking Mountain Creek Lake in the hill country of southwest Dallas, was donated by John Stemmons, Roland Pelt, and associates. An interested group of businessmen donated additional acreage, and in 1994 a donation by the Louis Hexter family brought the current size of the DBU campus, known as University Hill, to 292 acres (1.18 km^{2}). In 2018, an additional land acquisition increased the total campus size to 368 acres (1.49 km^{2}).

In 1968, the college moved from junior college to senior college status, subsequently offering its first four-year bachelor's degrees in May 1970. In 1985, the college officially changed its name to Dallas Baptist University. The new structure consisted of the College of Arts and Sciences, the Mary C. Crowley College of Christian Faith, the Dorothy M. Bush College of Education, and the College of Business.

=== Growth and expansion ===
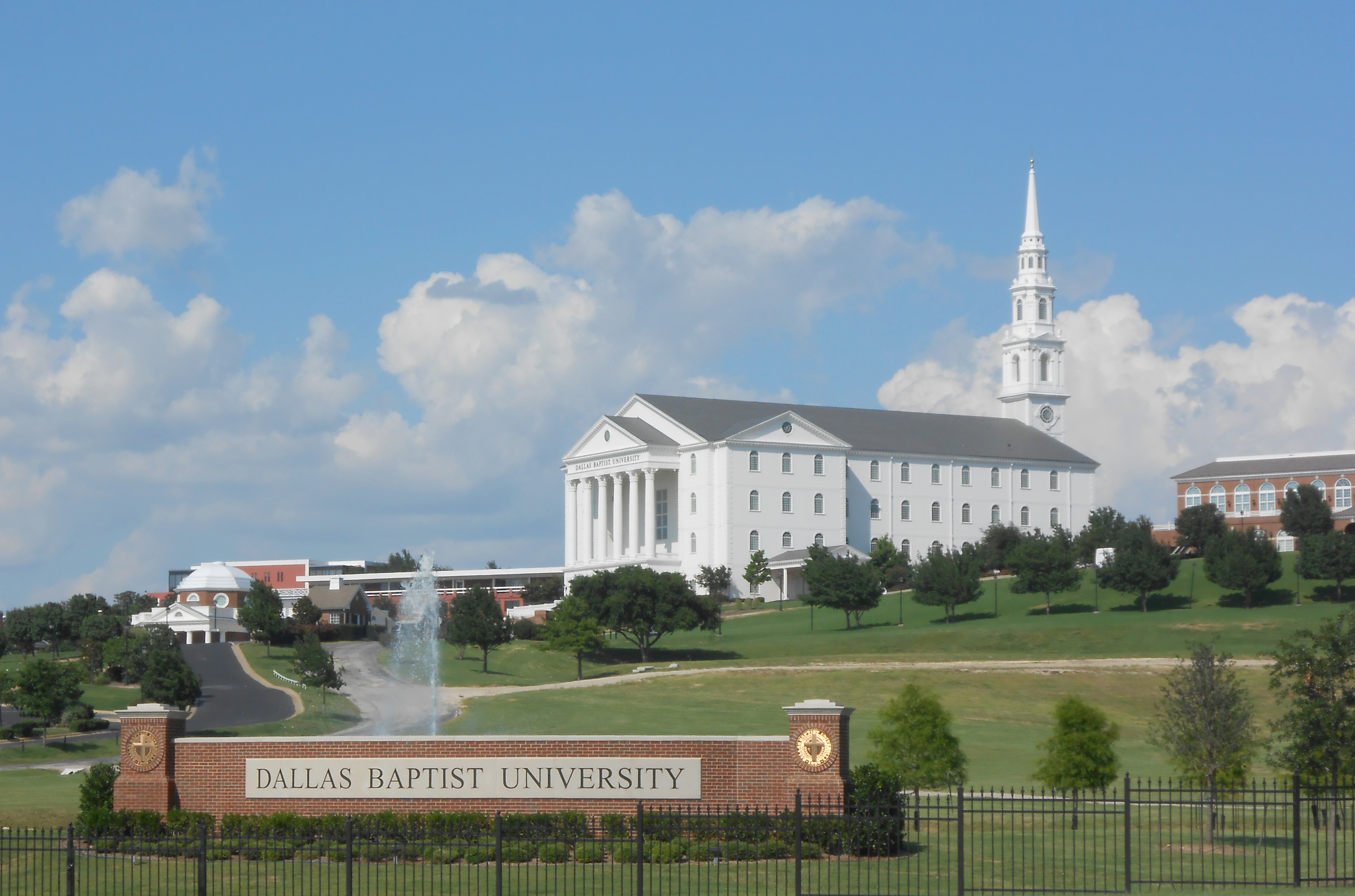
A view of the university

In 2019, the university enrolled 4,487 students. The university offers 84 undergraduate majors, 24 master's degree programs, over 45 dual master's programs, and 2 doctoral programs. While in its early years, the school had the reputation of being a commuter college, today's DBU has well over 2,000 students living on campus.

In 1992, the John G. Mahler Student Center, the first new building on the DBU campus in more than 20 years was dedicated. The building is a close replica of Independence Hall in Philadelphia, Pennsylvania, and it was the first of many new buildings in the Colonial architectural style on the campus; subsequent DBU buildings have adopted a similar theme of resembling famous buildings in American colonial history.

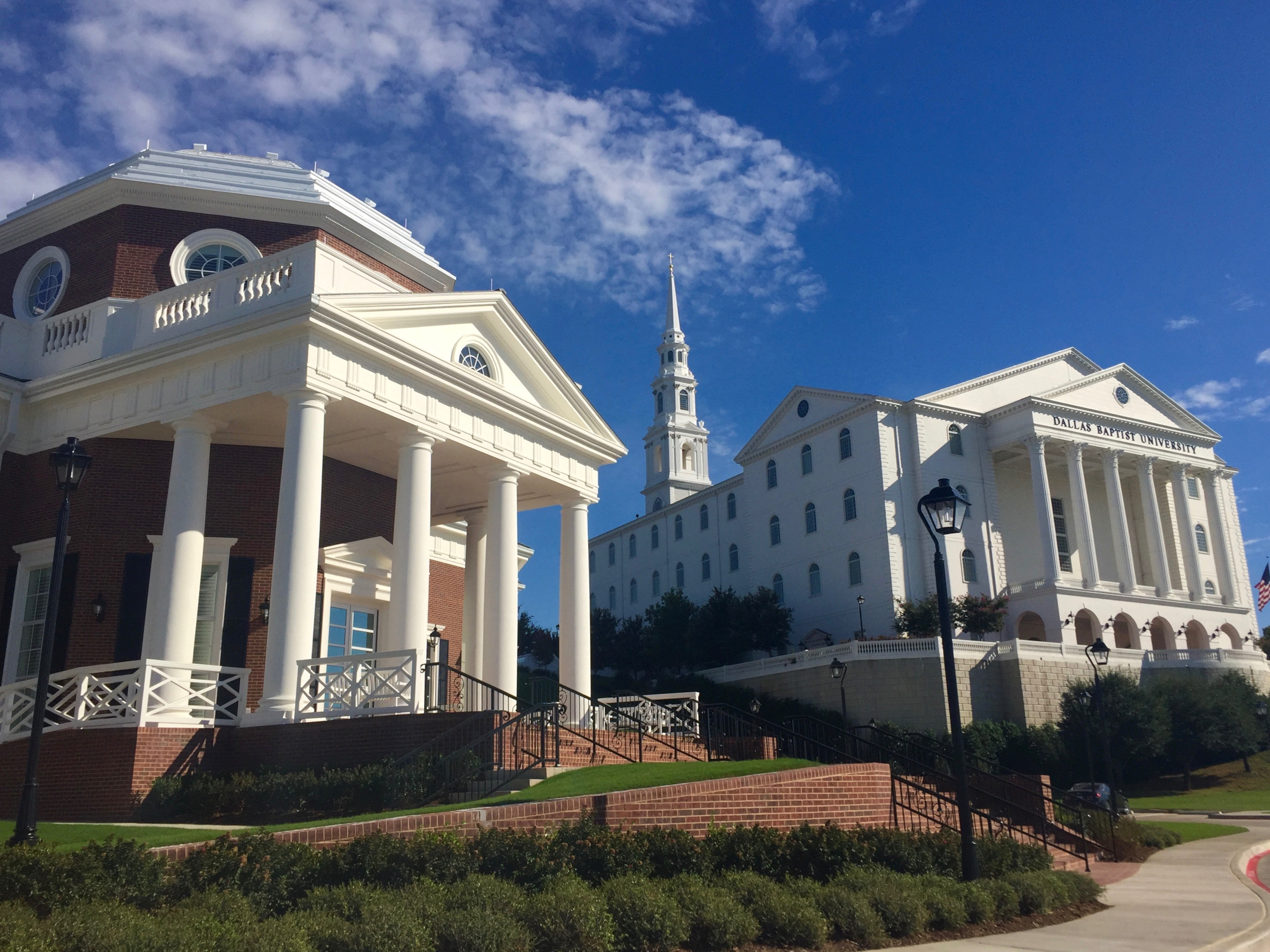
Nation Hall (foreground) and Pilgrim Chapel

In 2009, the Patty and Bo Pilgrim Chapel was dedicated. The structure is used for various events such as chapel services and concerts, and houses office space for the Graduate School of Ministry along with classrooms and a large multipurpose room. The inspiration for the exterior of the building came from the First Baptist Church in America, located in Providence, Rhode Island.

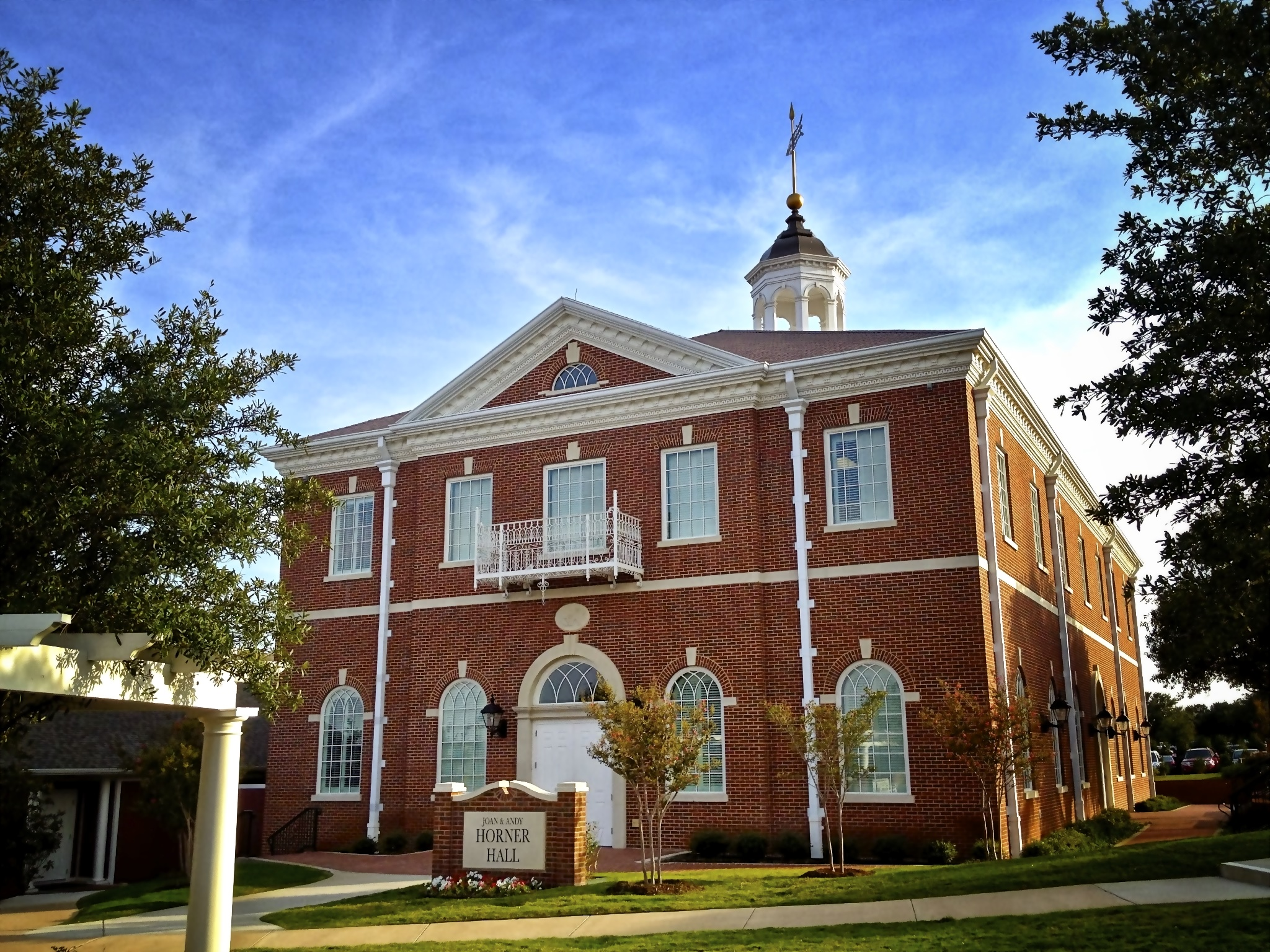
Joan and Andy Horner Hall

In the fall of 2011, the university opened the Joan and Andy Horner Hall. Named after the founders of Premier Designs, Horner Hall houses the DBU communication department, the offices for the College of Fine Arts, a multipurpose classroom and video recording studio, a design lab, and a music business recording studio, designed by the Russ Berger Design Group. The exterior of the structure is modeled after Congress Hall located in Philadelphia, Pennsylvania.

In 2001, DBU-North opened in Carrollton, Texas as DBU's first regional academic center, serving North Dallas and Collin County. For several years, DBU-North was located in Frisco, Texas, and in 2011, moved to Plano, Texas. DBU also opened DBU-Colleyville in the summer of 2005. In January 2009, the building was moved to Hurst and renamed the Herman and Patsy Smith Center, known as DBU-Hurst-Colleyville.

In 2015, Jim and Sally Nation Hall opened its doors. A near replica of Monticello, the building is the home of the Gary Cook School of Leadership, as well as other administrative offices. The building also houses several classrooms as well as a special event space situated in the dome of the building.

Further locations for special programs and opportunities include the Department of Military Science at University of Texas at Arlington (Army ROTC), Aerospace Studies at Texas Christian University (Air Force ROTC), and the Graduate Institute of Applied Linguistics in Dallas, Texas.

== Academics ==
=== Academic divisions ===
The university is divided into seven colleges: the Mary C. Crowley College of Christian Faith, the Dorothy M. Bush College of Education, the College of Business, the College of Fine Arts, the College of Humanities and Social Sciences, the College of Natural Sciences and Mathematics, and the College of Professional Studies. The university also houses two schools: the Graduate School of Ministry, as well as the Gary Cook School of Leadership. The university offers a Doctorate in Education (Ed.D.) in educational leadership through the Bush School of Education and a Doctorate of Philosophy (Ph.D.) in leadership studies through the Cook School of Leadership.

=== Accreditations and approvals ===
Dallas Baptist University is accredited by the Commission on Colleges of the Southern Association of Colleges and Schools and the National Association of Schools of Music (NASM). The College of Business is accredited by the Accreditation Council for Business Schools and Programs (ACBSP) to offer the Bachelor of Business Administration (B.B.A.) and the Master of Business Administration (M.B.A.) business degrees. In 2026, Dallas Baptist University also became a candidate for accreditation by the Association for Biblical Higher Education.

The teacher, principal, and superintendent education programs of the university are approved by the State Board for Educator Certification (SBEC).

DBU is also affiliated with the Baptist General Convention of Texas.

=== Institute for Global Engagement ===
The Institute for Global Engagement was founded at DBU in 2015 to be "a Christian, non-partisan think tank dedicated to addressing issues in the public square with biblical distinctiveness" and to be "a moral and spiritual catalyst for renewal in our culture." The goal of the institute is to be interdisciplinary in bringing together experts and practitioners from a variety of fields to address issues from a distinctively Christian worldview. Since its founding, the IGE has held several seminars and lectures featuring a variety of individuals, including author Eric Metaxas, former presidential speech writer Michael Gerson, political commentator Matthew Dowd, former UN Ambassador Samuel Brownback, and former Secretary of Defense Gen. Jim Mattis. The organization also produces The Daily Briefing, an email that goes out three times a week covering the news of the day with a Christian perspective.

=== Rankings and recognition ===
U.S. News & World Report ranked Dallas Baptist University #392-434 among "National Universities" in its 2024 college and university rankings.

== Traditions ==
In its early years, Dallas Baptist University's mascot was the Indians, but in the late 1980s, it was changed to the Patriot, and the school colors were changed from blue and gold to the more patriotic theme colors of red, white, and blue.

=== Cross Ring ===
The Official DBU Cross Ring serves as a symbol of the Christ-centered education students experience at DBU. The ring features many university symbols, including the Mahler Student Center, the Fishers of Men statue, as well as the university seal.

=== Mr. Patriot ===
One of DBU's longest-running traditions, stemming from when DBU's mascot was the Indians, is the Mr. Patriot pageant. This anticipated event, formerly named Mr. Big Chief from 1981 to 2018, allows male students to display their skills, humor, and creativity. The show, a mock beauty pageant, begins with an opening number performed by all the contestants and is followed by three categories: the stamp act (formalwear), the tea act (beachwear), and the intolerable act (talent). The categories were formerly known as just talent, beachwear, and formalwear. Magic tricks, lip-syncing, and musical interpretations are just some of the ways contestants have attempted to gain points in the past. The contestant with the most points at the end wins the coveted title and has the right to wear the coat and hat that have replaced the headdress on display in the Dean Learning Center as the prize.

=== Family events ===
Family Weekend and Grandparents Day allow students to invite their families into their lives on campus. Notable events include the Family Softball Game, Movie on the Quad, and Art Show as well as a family service project. Families are invited to fellowship with their students as well as the university faculty and staff through community activities and other fun events.

=== Unity Walk ===
Beginning in 2017, DBU has held an annual Unity Walk on Martin Luther King Jr. Day (MLK Day), with the DBU community coming together to remember the world of Martin Luther King Jr., and pray for the dream of a unified country to become a reality. In addition to the walk, a special speaker each year recites King's famous "I Have a Dream" speech. Also during the day, students, faculty, and staff participate in the service projects in Dallas as a part of the national MLK Day of Service.

== Athletics ==
Dallas Baptist University's Patriot Athletic Department sponsors 15 intercollegiate athletics teams that compete in the National Collegiate Athletic Association (NCAA) and the National Christian College Athletic Association (NCCAA). DBU also sponsors cheerleading and beginning in the fall of 2010, ice hockey at the club levels. All teams compete at the NCAA Division II level and compete in the Lone Star Conference, with the exception of the baseball team, which is a affiliate member of the Division I PAC-12 Conference. Although the baseball team played as an independent for several years, they accepted an invitation to join the Western Athletic Conference for the 2013 season, then joined Conference USA in the 2014 season. DBU also sponsors six intercollegiate club sports. The Diamond Belles are also an active part of the Patriot Athletic Department, serving as an auxiliary group.

In 2021, the women's golf team won the NCAA Division II National Championship.

The DBU baseball team continues to be a premier sport for the school, with the team returning to an NCAA Super Regionals for the second time in school history in 2021, falling to Virginia in Game 3.

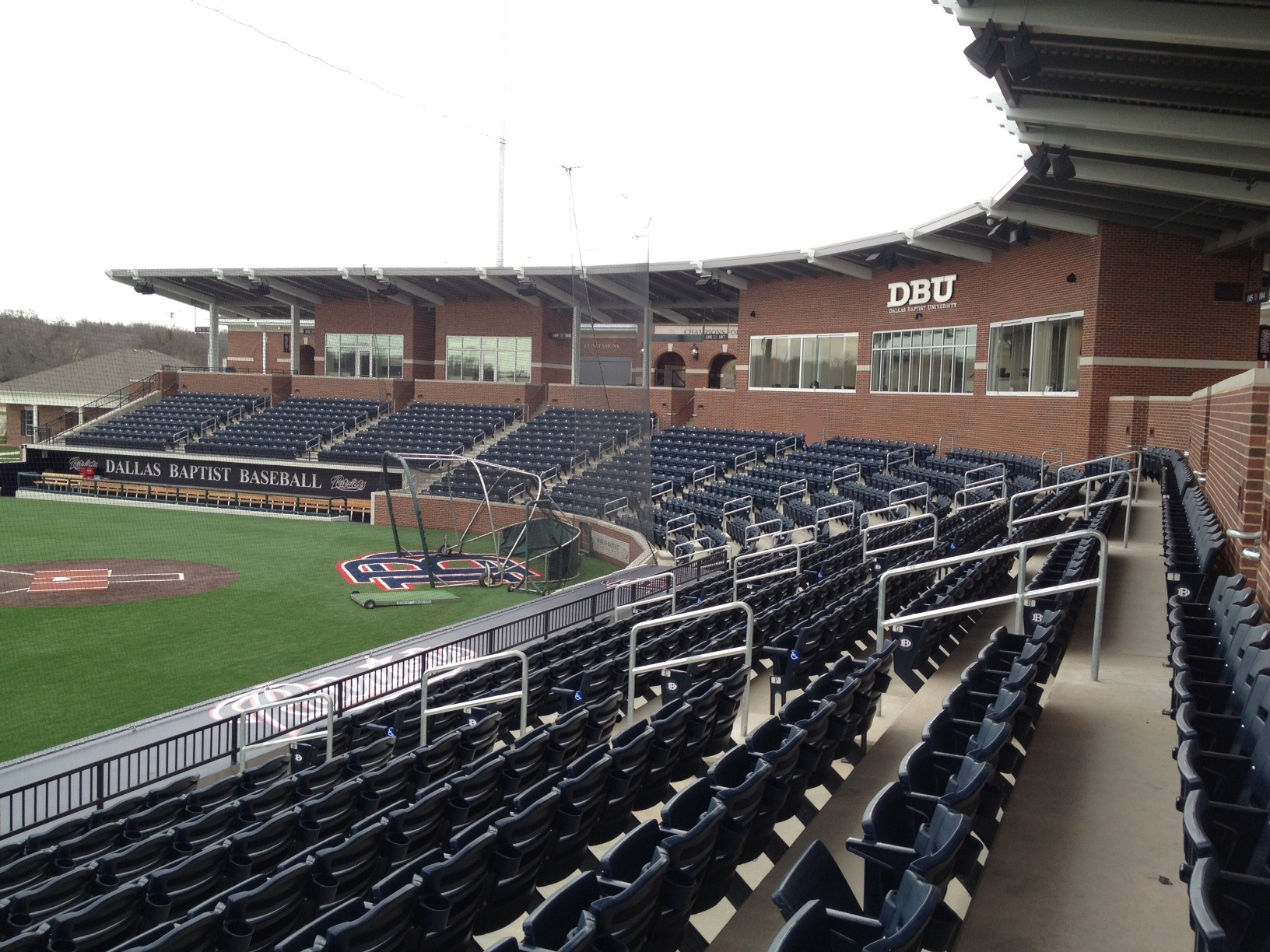
Horner Ballpark

The Athletic Department also features a Christ-centered Patriot Discipleship program, entitled "Champions for Christ," as well as the Athletic Department's Global Missions Initiative with athletic mission trips to Guatemala, Northern England, Peru, and South Korea.

=== Teams ===
A member of the Lone Star Conference, Dallas Baptist University sponsors eight men's and seven women's teams in NCAA-sanctioned sports: DBU is also home to a debate team that competes within the International Public Debate Association (IPDA). The team began competing in the fall of 2021.

Men's intercollegiate sports	Women's intercollegiate sports	Club sports
Baseball	Cross country	Ice hockey
Basketball	Golf	Cheerleading
Cross country	Soccer	Drill/dance (Patriettes)
Golf	Tennis	Bass fishing
Track and field	Track and field	Men's lacrosse
Tennis	Volleyball	Bowling
Soccer	Stunt	Esports

- Note = The Division I baseball team competes as an affiliate member of the Pac-12 Conference.

== Notable alumni ==
- Vic Black, professional baseball player
- David O'Neal Brown, former chief of the Dallas Police Department
- Chris Clayton, Christian music producer & songwriter
- Lew Ford, professional baseball player
- Ryan Goins, professional baseball player
- Kari Jobe, Christian music artist
- Phil King, member of the Texas House of Representatives
- Les Lancaster, professional baseball player
- Jason LaRue, professional baseball player
- Clifton McNeely, professional basketball player
- Scott Mullen, professional baseball player
- Colin Poche, professional baseball player
- Freddy Sanchez, professional baseball player
- Gwyn Shea, former Texas secretary of state (2002–2003) and a member of the Texas House of Representatives (1983–1993)
- Ron Simmons, former member of the Texas House of Representatives for District 65 in Denton County
- Tricia Woodgett, film producer, director, distributor, and screenwriter
- Ben Zobrist, professional baseball player
