= Tam Hollingshead =

American football coach

Tam Hollingshead (born c. 1955) is an American football coach. Since early 2015, he has been Director of External Operations for the Mustangs of Southern Methodist University in Dallas, Texas, after serving there as Director of High School Relations for June Jones. Hollingshead previously spent two seasons at Temple High School, and three seasons as the inaugural head coach at newly established Rockwall Heath High School.

From 1994 to 2002, Hollingshead was an assistant to R. C. Slocum at Texas A&M University, coaching tight ends and special teams. Prior to that, he served as head coach at famed Permian High School of Odessa, Texas, guiding the Panthers to a Class 5A State championship in 1991 and amassing a 43–4–2 record in four seasons. He had previously been an assistant coach at Permian, including the 1988 season covered in the book Friday Night Lights: A Town, a Team, and a Dream by H. G. Bissinger.

Hollingshead is a 1975 letterman at SMU and played football at Brownwood High School under legendary coach Gordon Wood.
