= Carter High =

2015 American sports film

- Directed by: Arthur Muhammad
- Written by: Arthur Muhammad
- Produced by: Kelly Gray; Greg Ellis
- Starring: Charles S. Dutton; Pooch Hall; David Banner; Vivica A. Fox; Reginald C. Hayes; Aundre Dean; Lynn Andrews; Mack White; Orlando Valentino; Brandon Christle; Robert Hayes
- Cinematography: Ron Gonzalez
- Edited by: Arthur Muhammad
- Music by: Giona Ostinelli
- Distributed by: Novus
- Release date: October 30, 2015
- Running time: 120 minutes
- Country: United States
- Language: English
- Box office: $240,214

Carter High is a 2015 American sports film directed and written by Arthur Muhammad. The film is centered on the 1988 Cowboys of David W. Carter High School in Dallas, a team that fought through racial prejudice and a grades controversy to claim the 5A state title, only to be rocked when six of their players were involved in an armed robbery and the grades issue stripped them of their title. The film is produced by former Dallas Cowboys Defensive End Greg Ellis.

== Plot ==
The film starts with a court sentencing procedure due to crimes committed by various Carter High football team members. We subsequently learn about each of the player's background. One student transferred classes due to an incomplete grade, that could have caused his ineligibility to stay on the football team. In 1988, the Carter High Cowboys football team was involved in a public scandal while in the midst of a run in the Texas 5A state playoffs, which included a semifinal victory over Odessa's Permian High that would become a central event in the book (and subsequent movie and television treatments) Friday Night Lights: A Town, a Team, and a Dream.

== Cast ==
- Charles S. Dutton as Coach Freddie James
- Pooch Hall as Coach Vonner
- David Banner as Royce West
- John West Jr. as Bryce
- Reginald C. Hayes as Mr. Russeau
- Vivica A. Fox as Mrs. James

== See also ==
- List of American football films
- Friday Night Lights
