= Bront Bird =

American football player (born 1989)

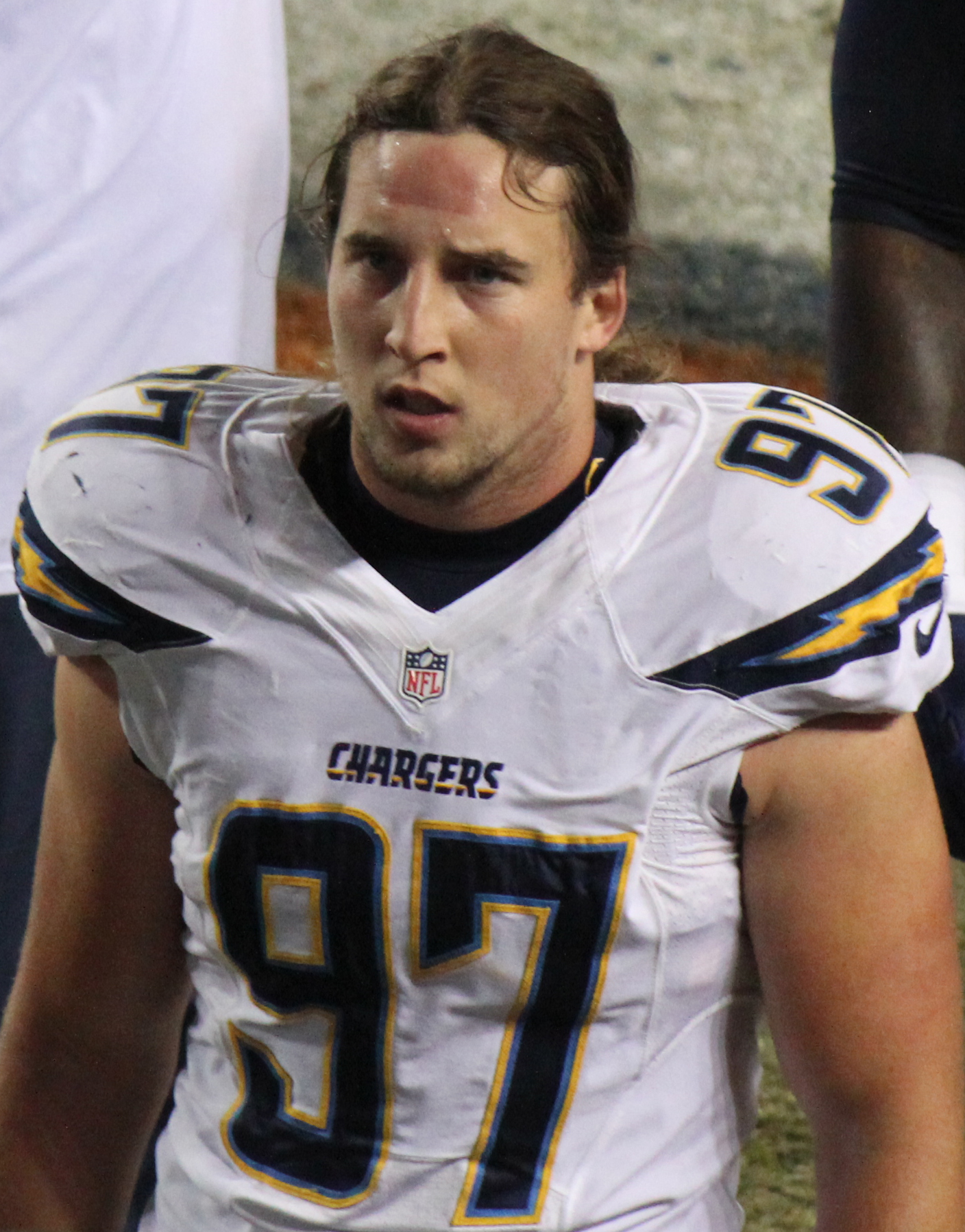
- Bird with the San Diego Chargers

No. 97
- Position: Linebacker

Personal information
- Born: March 17, 1989 (age 37); Odessa, Texas, U.S.
- Listed height: 6 ft 4 in (1.93 m)
- Listed weight: 250 lb (113 kg)

Career information
- High school: Permain (Odessa)
- College: Texas Tech
- NFL draft: 2011: undrafted

Career history
- San Diego Chargers (2011–2013)

Career NFL statistics
- Total tackles: 61
- Pass deflections: 4
- Interceptions: 1
- Stats at Pro Football Reference

Bront Bird (born March 17, 1989) is an American former professional football player who was a linebacker for the San Diego Chargers of the National Football League (NFL). He played college football for the Texas Tech Red Raiders and was signed by the Chargers as an undrafted free agent in 2011.

== Early life ==
Bird played high school football at Permian High School in Odessa, Texas, where he was a standout at wide receiver and linebacker.

== Professional career ==
After going undrafted in the 2011 NFL draft, Bront "the Big" Bird was signed by the San Diego Chargers on July 26, 2011. In 2011, Bird recorded 14 total tackles, 11 of them being solo.
