= Charles S. Dutton =

American actor, director and producer (born 1951)

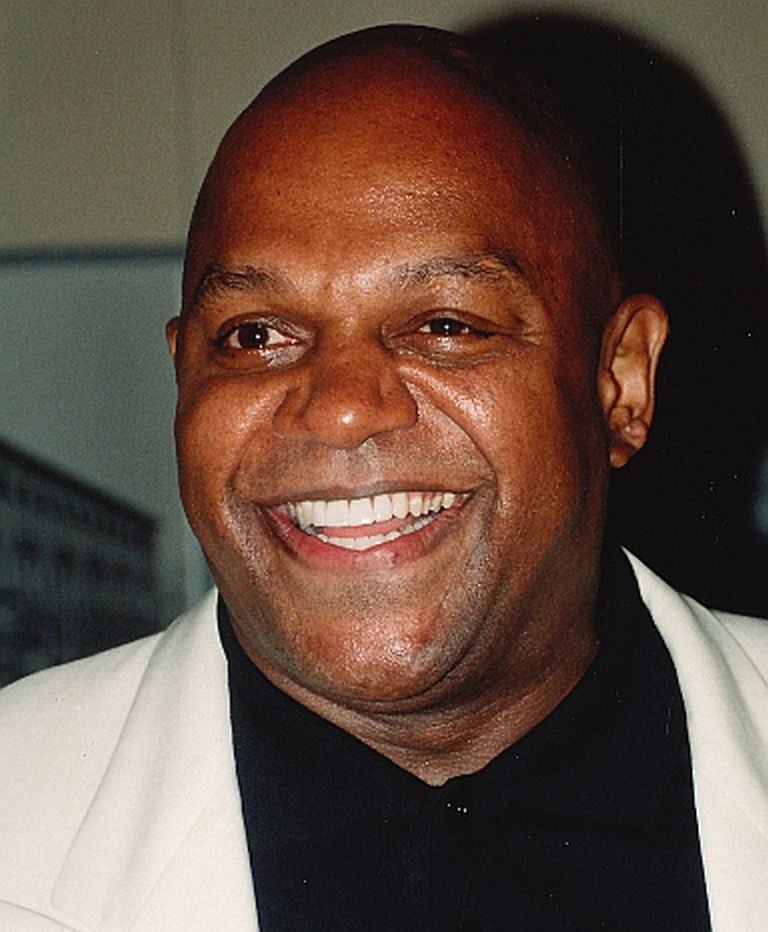
- Dutton in 2000
- Born: Charles Stanley Dutton; January 30, 1951 (age 75); Baltimore, Maryland, U.S.
- Education: Hagerstown Community College (AA); Towson University (BA); Yale University (MFA)
- Occupations: Actor; director; producer
- Years active: 1984–2016
- Spouse: Debbi Morgan (m. 1989; div. 1994)

Charles Stanley Dutton (born January 30, 1951) is an American actor and director. He is best known for his roles in the television series Roc (1991–1994) and the television film The Piano Lesson (1995), the latter of which earned him a Golden Globe Award nomination. His other accolades include three Primetime Emmy Awards and three NAACP Image Awards.

Dutton has appeared in many feature films such as Alien 3 (1992), Menace II Society (1993), A Time to Kill (1996), Black Dog (1998), Cookie's Fortune (1999), and Gothika (2003). On television, he also appeared in Homicide: Life on the Street, Oz, The Sopranos, House M.D., as well as his Emmy Award-winning guest star turns on The Practice and Without a Trace. He directed the HBO miniseries The Corner, which earned him an Emmy Award for directing.

== Early life ==
Charles Stanley Dutton was born on January 30, 1951, on the east side of Baltimore, Maryland. His father was a truck driver and his parents divorced when he was four. He grew up in Baltimore's Latrobe Homes public housing project. In his youth, Dutton dropped out of school before finishing middle school. He had a short-lived stint as an amateur boxer with the nickname "Roc", a nickname derived from "Rockhead", due to rock throwing battles which took place during Dutton's childhood.

In 1967, when he was 16, Dutton got into a fight that resulted in the death of a man Dutton claimed had attacked him with a knife.

== Prison convictions, discovering acting, and education ==
After the knife fight, Dutton pleaded guilty in 1967 to manslaughter and was sentenced to five years in prison, which he began serving at the Maryland House of Correction in Jessup, Maryland. Out on parole after 18 or 20 months, (Note: Some sources say 18 months, others like the 2000 Farhi article state 20 months.) he was arrested on robbery and handgun charges. He was sentenced on the handgun violation and sent to the Maryland Penitentiary, near his boyhood home, for three more years. A fight with a guard added on another eight years. In reference to this, Dutton later said, "I got three years for killing a black man and eight for punching a white man."

During his prison term, Dutton was stabbed by another prisoner and nearly died. He became interested in radical movements and the Black Panther Party.

Several months into his second prison term, Dutton was sentenced to six days of solitary confinement for refusing to clean toilets. Prisoners were allowed to take one book and, unintentionally, he grabbed an anthology of black playwrights. He enjoyed the book so much that upon release from solitary, he petitioned the warden to start a drama group for the winter talent show. The warden agreed on the condition that Dutton go back to school and get his GED. Dutton accomplished that and eventually completed a two-year college program at Hagerstown Junior College (now Hagerstown Community College) in Hagerstown, Maryland, graduating with an Associate of Arts degree in 1976.

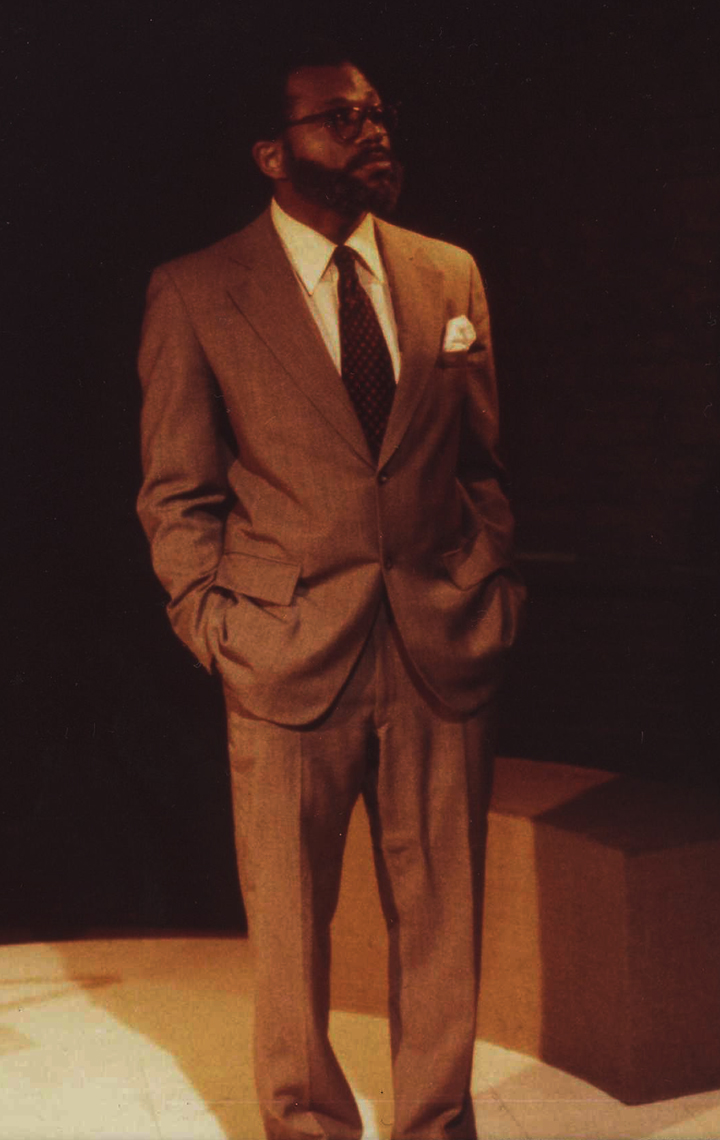
Dutton acting in a 1979 production of Equus

Dutton was paroled on August 20, 1976. After his release from prison, he enrolled as a drama major at Towson State University (now Towson University) in the Baltimore suburb of Towson, Maryland, where he graduated with a Bachelor of Arts degree in 1978. After his time at Towson, Dutton earned a master's degree in acting from the Yale School of Drama in 1983.

== Acting career ==
In 1984, Dutton made his Broadway debut in August Wilson's Ma Rainey's Black Bottom, winning a Theatre World Award and a Tony Award nomination for Best Actor. In 1988, Dutton played Leroy Brown in Crocodile Dundee II and a killer in the television miniseries The Murder of Mary Phagan opposite Jack Lemmon and Kevin Spacey. In 1990, Dutton earned a second Best Actor Tony nomination for his role in another Wilson play, The Piano Lesson. Dutton co-starred in Alien 3, the debut film of director David Fincher, then co-starred in 1993's Rudy. Other films he has appeared in include Get on the Bus, A Time to Kill, Cookie's Fortune, Cry, the Beloved Country, Surviving the Game, Menace II Society, Secret Window, and A Low Down Dirty Shame.

Dutton won Outstanding Guest Actor Emmy Awards in 2002 and 2003 for his roles in The Practice and Without a Trace. He was previously nominated in 1999 for his guest-starring role as Alvah Case in the HBO prison drama Oz in its second-season premiere episode. For this role, he was also nominated for an NAACP Image Award. Also in 1999, he starred in an ensemble cast in Aftershock: Earthquake in New York in which he played the Mayor of New York City. Dutton gained acclaim for his comedy show Roc shown on FOX television (but produced by HBO) from 1991 to 1994. His work in this role won him an NAACP Image Award. He co-starred in the popular but short-lived 2005 CBS science fiction series, Threshold.

In 2000, Dutton directed the HBO miniseries The Corner. The miniseries was close to his heart, for Dutton grew up on the streets of East Baltimore. It was adapted from The Corner: A Year in the Life of an Inner-City Neighborhood (Broadway Books, 1997) by David Simon (a reporter for the Baltimore Sun) and Ed Burns (a retired Baltimore homicide detective). The Corner won several Emmys in 2000, including Best Miniseries. Dutton won for his direction of the miniseries. He worked with Simon previously in a 1996 episode of Homicide: Life on the Street.

He starred as Montgomery County, Maryland Police Chief Charles Moose in the 2003 made-for-TV movie D.C. Sniper: 23 Days of Fear, and appeared in Season 2 of The L Word. Dutton also appeared in "Another Toothpick", an episode of The Sopranos. He guest starred on House M.D. as the father of Dr. Eric Foreman (Omar Epps). Dutton also had small roles in First Time Felon alongside Omar Epps and on Sleeper Cell: American Terror as the father of undercover FBI agent Darwyn Al-Sayeed. He also directed two episodes of Sleeper Cell.

On October 9, 2007, HBO announced that it had arranged a deal with Dutton where he would develop, direct, and star in series and movies for the network. He also appeared in the 2007 film Honeydripper. On February 14, 2013, Dutton returned to TV in Zero Hour, playing the role of a priest. In 2013, Dutton played Detective Margolis in the horror film The Monkey's Paw.

== Filmography ==
=== Film ===
Charles S. Dutton film credits
Year	Title	Role	Notes
1985	Cat's Eye	Dom	
1986	The Best of Times	Doctor Death	Uncredited
1988	No Mercy	Sergeant Sandy	
1988	Crocodile Dundee II	Leroy Brown	
1989	Jacknife	Jake	
1990	Q&A	Detective Sam Chapman	
1991	Mississippi Masala	Tyrone Williams	
1992	Jack Reed: One of Our Own	Lt. Charles Silvera	
1992	Alien 3	Leonard Dillon	Nominated—Saturn Award for Best Supporting Actor
1992	The Distinguished Gentleman	Elijah Hawkins	
1993	Menace II Society	Mr. Butler	
1993	Rudy	Fortune	
1994	Surviving the Game	Walter Cole	
1994	Foreign Student	Howlin' Wolf	
1994	A Low Down Dirty Shame	Sonny Rothmiller	
1995	Cry, the Beloved Country	John Kumalo	
1995	Seven	Cop	Uncredited
1995	Nick of Time	Huey	
1996	A Time to Kill	Sheriff Ozzie Walls	
1996	Get on the Bus	George	
1997	Mimic	Officer Leonard Norton	
1998	Black Dog	Agent Allen Ford	
1999	Cookie's Fortune	Willis Richland	Nominated—Independent Spirit Award for Best Supporting Male
1999	Random Hearts	Alcee	
2002	Eye See You	FBI Agent Hendricks	
2003	Gothika	Dr. Douglas Grey	
2004	Against the Ropes	Felix Reynolds	Also director
2004	Secret Window	Ken Karsch	
2005	The L.A. Riot Spectacular	The Mayor	
2007	Honeydripper	Maceo	
2008	The Third Nail	Sydney Washington	
2008	American Violet	Reverend Sanders	
2008	The Express: The Ernie Davis Story	Willie Davis	
2009	Fame	Mr. James Dowd	
2010	Legion	Percy Walker	
2012	Bad Ass	Panther	
2012	Least Among Saints	George	
2012	The Obama Effect	John Thomas	
2012	LUV	Cofield	
2013	The Monkey's Paw	Detective Margolis	
2014	Android Cop	Mayor Jacobs	
2014	Scooby-Doo! WrestleMania Mystery	Cookie (voice)	
2014	Comeback Dad	Othell	
2015	The Perfect Guy	Roger Vaughn	
2015	Carter High	Freddie James	
2016	Veneration	Lt. A.J. Robertson	Short

=== Television ===
Charles S. Dutton television credits
Year	Title	Role	Notes
1985, 1986	Miami Vice	Lieutenant Pearson/Ed McCain	2 episodes
1985	The Equalizer	Abmennet	Episode: "Bump and Run"
1986	Cagney & Lacey	Mr. Johnson	Episode: "The Marathon"
1986	Apology	Asst. District Attorney	Television film
1988	The Murder of Mary Phagan	Jim Conley	Television film
1991–1994	Roc	Roc Emerson	72 episodes
1994	Are You Afraid of the Dark?	Captain Jonas Cutter	2 episodes
1995	The Piano Lesson	Boy Willie	Television film Nominated—Golden Globe Award for Best Actor – Miniseries or Television Film; Nominated—Primetime Emmy Award for Outstanding Lead Actor in a Miniseries or a Movie
1995	Zooman	Emmett	Television film
1996	Homicide: Life on the Street	Elijah Sanborn	Episode: "Prison Riot"
1997	First Time Felon	N/A	Television film Director
1998	Oz	Professor Alvah Case	Episode: "The Tip"; Nominated—Primetime Emmy Award for Outstanding Guest Actor in a Drama Series
1998	Blind Faith	Charles Williams	Nominated—Independent Spirit Award for Best Supporting Male; Nominated—Screen Actors Guild Award for Outstanding Performance by a Male Actor in a Miniseries or Television Movie
1999	Aftershock: Earthquake in New York	Mayor Bruce Lincoln	Television film
1999	The 60's	Reverend Willie Taylor	Television film
2000	Deadlocked	Jacob Doyle	Television film
2000	For Love or Country	Dizzy Gillespie	Television film
2000	The Corner	N/A	Miniseries; 6 episodes Director; Primetime Emmy Award for Outstanding Directing for a Limited Series, Movie, or Dramatic Special
2001	Ed	Reverend Carver	Episode: "Valentine's Day"
2001	The Sopranos	Officer Wilmore	Episode: "Another Toothpick"
2001	The Practice	Leonard Marshall	Episode: "Killing Time"; Primetime Emmy Award for Outstanding Guest Actor in a Drama Series
2002	10,000 Black Men Named George	Milton Webster	Television film
2002–2003	Without a Trace	Chet Collins	2 episodes Primetime Emmy Award for Outstanding Guest Actor in a Drama Series
2003	D.C. Sniper: 23 Days of Fear	Chief Charles Moose	Television film
2004	Something the Lord Made	William Thomas	Television film
2005	Mayday	Admiral Randolf Hennings	Television film
2005	The L Word	Dr. Benjamin Bradshaw	4 episodes
2005–2006	Threshold	J.T. Baylock	13 episodes
2006–2007	House	Rodney Foreman	2 episodes
2007	My Name Is Earl	Reggie	Episode: "Get a Real Job"
2008	Racing for Time	Lt. Stack	Television film Also director
2009	CSI: NY	Talmadge Neville	Episode: "Greater Good"
2010	Dark Blue	Walter Shell	Episode: "Shell Game"
2011	Law & Order: LA	Reverend Davidson	Episode: "Carthay Circle"
2011	Criminal Minds	Tony Cole	Episode: "The Bittersweet Science"
2011	American Horror Story: Murder House	Detective Granger	2 episodes
2012	The Good Wife	Pastor Damon	Episode: "Blue Ribbon Panel"
2012–2014	Longmire	Detective Fales	6 episodes
2013	Zero Hour	Father Mickle	6 episodes
2014	The Following	FBI Director Tom Franklin	Episode: "The Messenger"
2015	Bessie	William 'Pa' Rainey	Television film

== Stage ==
Year	Title	Role	Notes
1984	Ma Rainey's Black Bottom	Levee	Broadway; Theatre World Award; Nominated—Tony Award for Best Featured Actor in a Play - 1985
1988	Splendid Mummer	Ira Frederick Aldridge	Off-Broadway; American Place Theatre; Arena Stage
1990	The Piano Lesson	Boy Willie	Broadway; Nominated—Tony Award for Best Actor in a Play
2003	Ma Rainey's Black Bottom (revival)	Levee	Broadway
2009	Death of a Salesman	Willy Loman	Yale Repertory Theater
