= John Wilkins (American football) =

American football coach

John Wilkins is a former American football coach. He was highly successful in his 13 years as head coach of Permian High School in Odessa, Texas, amassing a 148–16–7 record and two Class 5A state titles. John was inducted into the Texas High School Coaches Association Hall of Honor July 30, 2003.

Wilkins became head coach at Odessa Permian in 1973 after serving as an assistant to Gil Bartosh. In 1975, Permian made the state final for the first time during Wilkins' tenure, but lost 20–10 to Port Neches-Groves. Five years later, Odessa Permian faced Port Arthur Jefferson, guided by Ronnie Thompson and led by quarterback Todd Dodge. Permian won the game 28–19. Wilkins' 1984 squad tied Beaumont French for the title. The next year, Permian lost to Houston Yates in a 37–0 blowout at the Texas Stadium.

In 1985 Wilkins left his coach's office in order to become athletic director of the Ector County Independent School District. Wilkins took the athletic director job at private Trinity School of Midland, Texas in 1998, and found himself back on the sideline as head coach until Spring 2002. He currently resides in East Odessa Texas.
