= John Wilkin (disambiguation) =

John Wilkin is an American librarian.

John, Johnny, Jon or Jonathan Wilkin may also refer to:

- John Wilkin (cricketer) (1914–2017), Australian cricketer
- John Buck Wilkin (1946–2024), American singer-songwriter
- Jon Wilkin (born 1983), English rugby league footballer

== See also ==
- John Wilkins (disambiguation)
