= David W. Carter High School =

Location
- 1819 West Wheatland Road; Dallas, Texas 75232; United States; 32.6483°N 96.8482°W

Information
- Type: public, secondary
- Opened: 1966
- School district: Dallas Independent School District
- Principal: Michael Jones
- Faculty: 185
- Teaching staff: 73.22 (FTE)
- Grades: 9-12
- Enrollment: 1,097 (2025-2026)
- Student to teacher ratio: 14.39
- Color: Columbia Blue White Red
- Mascot: Cowboys
- Trustee dist.: 6, Joyce Foreman
- Learning Community: Central Network, Deardra Hayes-Whigham
- Website: dallasisd.org/carter

David Wendel Carter High School (commonly referred to as Dallas Carter) is a public high school located in the Oak Cliff area of Dallas, Texas, United States. The school is a part of the Dallas Independent School District and is classified as a 4A school by the UIL. In 2015, the school was rated "Met Standard" by the Texas Education Agency.

== History ==
The school was built in 1965 and is named after David Wendel Carter, a doctor and member of the DISD school board. He served on the school board for 25 years, from 1925 to 1950, longer than any other member. Carter also served as the school board's president for 16 years. The school graduated its first class of seniors in 1968.

The school initially drew students from Justin F. Kimball High School; the two schools maintain a highly competitive rivalry to this day. The two schools face each other annually in football as "The Oak Cliff Super Bowl."

In 2005, after the closure of the Wilmer-Hutchins Independent School District, Carter absorbed some WHISD high school students.

In 2011 the district re-opened Wilmer Hutchins High School. Some former WHISD zones covered by Carter were rezoned to Wilmer-Hutchins.

== Demographics ==
As of 2026, David Wendel Carter High School has a student population of 1,097 that is 0.2% Native American, 0.2% Asian, 1.2% multiracial, 1.5% white, 39.9% Hispanic, and 57% black. The school's graduation rate is 74%.

== Athletics ==
The David W. Carter Cowboys compete in the following sports:

- Baseball
- Basketball
- Cross Country
- Football
- Golf
- Soccer
- Softball
- Swimming and Diving
- Tennis
- Track and Field
- Volleyball
- Wrestling

=== State titles ===
- Boys Basketball
  - 2026(4A/D2)

=== Football ===
The 1988 football team won the 5A state title and was the subject of two films. They are mentioned at the end of the novel Friday Night Lights: A Town, a Team, and a Dream, which was a chronicle of Permian High School that lost to Carter in the semifinals that year.

The Cowboys won 31-14 in the championship game over the Judson Rockets of Converse, before academic violations stripped the title from Carter, years later, and gave it to Judson.

In addition to finishing as state semifinalist in 1971, 1974, 1982, and 1990, the team reached the playoffs in every year from 1990 to 2010.

== Feeder schools ==
The following schools are feeder schools for David W. Carter High School as of the 2026-2027 school year.

=== Elementary schools ===
- Umphrey Lee Elementary School
- T. G. Terry Elementary School
- Adelle Turner Elementary School
- Martin Weiss Elementary School
- Birdie Alexander Elementary School
- Ronald E. McNair Elementary School

=== Middle school ===
- Judge Louis A. Bedford Jr. Law Academy Middle School

== Notable alumni ==
- Clifton Abraham (class of 1990): American and Canadian football player
- Karan Ashley: Actress known as Aisha Campbell, the second yellow ranger in Mighty Morphin Power Rangers
- Jessie Armstead (class of 1989): American football linebacker from 1993 to 2003 (New York Giants, Washington Redskins)
- Chet Brooks (class of 1984): American football defensive back; two-time Super Bowl champion with the San Francisco 49ers
- Joe Burch (class of 1989): American football offensive and defensive lineman
- Jerametrius Butler: American football cornerback at Kansas State and later the St. Louis Rams, Washington Redskins, Buffalo Bills, and New Orleans Saints.
- Jeremy Combs (born 1995), basketball player for Israeli team Hapoel Ramat Gan Givatayim
- Michael Crabtree (class of 2006): wide receiver for the Baltimore Ravens; first-team All-American for Texas Tech
- Adrian Hamilton (class of 2006): NFL linebacker with the Baltimore Ravens from 2012 to 2015
- Ennis Haywood (class of 1998): American football running back for the Dallas Cowboys
- Greg Hill (class of 1990): professional American football running back from 1994 to 1999
- Rod Harris (class of 1984): professional American football wide receiver in the NFL and CFL
- Darren "Tank" Lewis (class of 1987): American former professional football player in the early 1990s
- DeMarcus Love (class of 2006): American football offensive tackle for the Minnesota Vikings
- Le'Shai Maston (class of 1989): American football running back from 1993 to 1998
- Liz Mikel (class of 1981): actress in stage, television, and film and jazz singer; noted roles in the movie Welcome Home Roscoe Jenkins and TV series Friday Night Lights
- Sha'Carri Richardson (class of 2018): Olympic champion in track and field
- Mark Sanford (transferred to Lincoln High School of San Diego): basketball player in the NBA from 1997 to 2002
- DeWayne Scales (class of 1977): basketball player in the NBA and CBA from 1980 to 1986
- Jonathan Scott (class of 2001): American football offensive tackle
- Vernon Smith (class of 1977): professional basketball player
- Craig Watkins (class of 1986): Dallas County District Attorney since 2007; first African American to hold such office both county and statewide
- Deandre Elliot (class of 2011): American football cornerback

== Notable faculty ==
- Freddie James, former head football coach from 1982 to 1995
- Gerald Lewis, former basketball coach

== See also ==
- Carter High, a movie based on Carter's 1988 football team.
