= Schuyler's Monster =

2008 non-fiction book by Robert Rummel-Hudson

Schuyler's Monster: A Father's Journey with His Wordless Daughter
- Author: Robert Rummel-Hudson
- Language: English
- Subject: Parenting of author's special needs child
- Publisher: St. Martin's Press
- Publication date: February 2008
- Media type: Print (Hardcover)
- Pages: 288
- ISBN: 978-0-312-37242-2
- OCLC: 156832409
- Dewey Decimal: 618.92 22
- LC Class: RJ506.D47 H83 2008

Schuyler's Monster: A Father's Journey with His Wordless Daughter is a book by Robert Rummel-Hudson. Rummel-Hudson began writing online in 1995 and also writes a parenting blog called Fighting Monsters with Rubber Swords; both book and blog concern the author's and his wife's parenting of their daughter who was born with polymicrogyria, a brain disorder that made her unable to speak.

Commentary on Rummel-Hudson's writings have been featured on NPR's "Weekend America" and in the Austin Chronicle, the Irish Times, the New Haven Register, the Dallas Morning News, Wondertime Magazine, and Good Housekeeping.
