= Friday Night Lights (film) =

2004 film by Peter Berg

- Theatrical release poster
- Directed by: Peter Berg
- Screenplay by: David Aaron Cohen; Peter Berg
- Based on: Friday Night Lights by H. G. Bissinger
- Produced by: Brian Grazer
- Starring: Billy Bob Thornton; Derek Luke; Jay Hernandez; Lucas Black; Garrett Hedlund; Tim McGraw
- Cinematography: Tobias Schliessler
- Edited by: Colby Parker Jr.; David Rosenbloom; Gabrielle Fasulo
- Music by: Brian Reitzell; Explosions in the Sky; Justin Stanley; David Torn
- Production company: Imagine Entertainment
- Distributed by: Universal Pictures
- Release date: October 8, 2004 (United States)
- Running time: 118 minutes
- Country: United States
- Language: English
- Budget: $30 million
- Box office: $62 million

Friday Night Lights is a 2004 American sports drama film directed by Peter Berg, who co-wrote the screenplay with David Aaron Cohen. It is based on the 1990 book by H. G. Bissinger. The film follows the coach and players of a high school football team in Odessa, Texas. The film followed the story of the 1988 Permian High School Panthers football team as they made a run towards the state championship.

Friday Night Lights was released by Universal Pictures on October 8, 2004. The film received positive reviews from critics and grossed $62 million against a $30 million budget. A television series of the same name premiered on October 3, 2006, on NBC. The film won the Best Sports Movie ESPY Award and was ranked number 37 on Entertainment Weekly's list of the Best High School Movies.

== Plot ==
As preseason practice begins for the Permian High School football team in August 1988, the football-crazed town of Odessa, Texas, has high expectations for the players and their coach Gary Gaines to win a state championship with their blue chip running back James "Boobie" Miles. The quarterback, Mike Winchell, runs under the expectation of handing off the ball to Miles on most plays. Fullback Don Billingsley struggles with his ball handling and is abused by his alcoholic father, Charles, who won a state championship with Permian in his youth. The players frequently party as a way of coping with the pressures of Odessa's high expectations.

In the season opener against the Marshall Bulldogs, the Permian Panthers make the game a blowout and Miles displays his best abilities in front of several scouts from prestigious universities. Gaines intends to bench Miles in the waning minutes but keeps him in after third-stringer Chris Comer accidentally misplaces his helmet, making him unprepared to go in. Miles is sent in but severely tears his ACL after being tackled at the knee on the ensuing play. After the incident, Gaines endures intense public backlash from the town for keeping Miles in. In the next game, at the start of district play, Permian gets blown out as Winchell struggles with consistency in his increased role. However, after the Panthers fall behind by 14 in the next game, Comer comes into the game after the second-string running back gets injured and helps Winchell and Billingsley get Permian's offense rolling again, leading them to a comeback win. Despite their small size, Permian's defense proves to be stout under the leadership of safety Brian Chavez and linebacker Ivory Christian, and the Panthers embark on a five-game winning streak.

Miles holds out hope that he can return to playing soon. Unfortunately, his MRI scan shows that he needs immediate knee surgery and cannot play for the rest of the season. Miles boldly denies the severity of his knee injury and lies to Gaines so he can suit up again, with his uncle and legal guardian L.V. providing backup. Permian plays its final district game against Midland Lee with first place and a playoff berth on the line. The Panthers fall behind, and Gaines puts Miles in out of desperation, but Miles is soon injured again. Winchell leads a comeback drive, but Permian ultimately loses as his final pass flies over the receiver's hands. After the game, Billingsley fights with his drunk father, who throws his state championship ring onto the side of the freeway. The following day, Don reveals to his father that he recovered the championship ring and gives it back to him. Charles partially apologizes and makes the point that his state championship was the best thing that happened to him, and he now has nothing happy except those memories. The loss puts Permian in a three-way tie for first place with Lee and Abilene Cooper, and a coin toss is held to determine which two teams make the playoffs. Permian and Lee win the toss, and Miles clears his locker as the Panthers prepare for the playoffs. While in his uncle's car, he cries about his future being bleak now that his promising football career has ended.

Permian is successful in the playoffs, but all eyes are on the state powerhouse Dallas Carter High School. Permian and Carter make it to the state championship game, which is held at the Astrodome as a neutral site. Miles rejoins the team and watches from the sidelines as the Panthers head into the game. They are initially overwhelmed by Carter's superior size and fall behind, although an interception by Christian helps get them on the board before halftime. In the second half, Carter gains a 20-point lead after a pass on fourth down, which hit the turf, is erroneously ruled complete. However, Permian's defense improves its tackling, and the offense pushes through despite injuries as the Panthers score 14 unanswered points to cut the deficit to six. They stop Carter on fourth and inches, leaving the offense to go 75 yards in less than two minutes for the win. Winchell, Billingsley, and Comer are all injured, but the former two reenter the game. Billingsley takes the ball to the 1-yard line on fourth down, but the play is called back due to a holding penalty. With two seconds left, Winchell desperately runs the ball toward the goal line but is stopped just short, and Carter wins the championship. As the Permian players soak in their defeat, Billingsley reconciles with Charles.

Afterward, Gaines removes the outgoing seniors from his depth chart, and it is revealed that Winchell, Christian, Billingsley, Miles, and Chavez went on to have successful lives after their football careers ended, with only Christian earning a Division I scholarship. The film ends with the statement that Gaines and Comer led Permian to an undefeated state championship season the following year.

== Cast ==
- Billy Bob Thornton as Coach Gary Gaines
- Derek Luke as James "Boobie" Miles
- Jay Hernandez as Brian Chávez
- Lucas Black as Michael "Mike" Winchell
- Garrett Hedlund as Donald "Donny" Billingsley
- Tim McGraw as Charles Billingsley
- Connie Britton as Sharon Gaines
- Lee Thompson Young as Christopher "Chris" Comer
- Lee Jackson as Ivory Christian
- Julius Tennon as Coach Freddie James
- Connie Cooper as Ms. Winchell
- Amber Heard as Maria
- Stephen Bishop as Loie Harris
- Christian Kane as Brian
- Brad Leland as John Aubrey
- Bryan Gutierrez as Midland Lee Trainer

=== Cameos ===
- Former NFL wide receiver Roy Williams (a Permian alumnus) had a cameo in the film as an assistant coach for Midland Lee, Permian's arch-rival. Williams' brother Lloyd Hill, was a wide receiver and safety on the Permian Panthers in 1987, 1988, and 1989.
- Some sequences during the state playoffs showed highlights from high school football games in Texas. In one of those highlights, NFL Pro Bowl cornerback Aqib Talib can be seen.
- Ty Law played a wide receiver for Dallas Carter, the team Permian played in the film's state championship game. He wore jersey #2, his last name was Graf, and he caught a one-handed touchdown pass.
- The real James "Boobie" Miles cameos as a Permian assistant coach in the film. Although he has no lines, he was seen several times in pivotal moments of the film including Miles’ career ending injury. In the locker room scene at halftime of the state championship game, Miles was seen standing next to his fictional counterpart as Coach Gaines gives his motivational speech.
- Bryan Gutierrez was a Team Manager with the 95 State Finalist Team.

== Differences between the film and real life events ==
=== Players ===
- In the film, Boobie Miles was depicted as one of the team's three captains, but that honor was held by Ivory Christian, Mike Winchell, and Brian Chavez in real life.
- In the film, some of the players' numbers and positions were changed: Boobie Miles was #45 and played tailback in the film but in the book he was playing fullback (while Don Billingsley was the tailback) and #35. In the film, Brian Chavez was the #4 strong safety, while he was the #85 tight end/defensive end in the book, and Ivory Christian was a defensive end and wore #90, while he was the #62 middle ("Mike") linebacker in the book. At the beginning of the film, as the camera panned over Coach Gaines' depth chart, 'Miles' name was listed under the FB tag. Chris Comer was also the backup fullback in the book, not a third-string tailback. One of the athletic directors in the stadium booth said, "I think he's a sophomore", when Comer was a junior at the time. Comer also wore #45 in the real season, but in the film, he wore #42. Alan Wyles was depicted as a wide receiver when he was the placekicker.
- Don Billingsley's father Charlie was depicted in the film as having won a state championship. In reality, as a junior, the 1968 Permian team lost the state championship finals to Austin's Northeast High School.

=== The regular season ===
In the film, the team was depicted as practicing in full pads and with full contact on the first day of practice. Under rules of the University Interscholastic League (UIL), the governing body for Texas public school sports, teams cannot use pads or hit until the fourth day of practice (however, in the deleted scenes included in the DVD, a non-pad practice was shown).

- A Permian booster was heard toasting Coach Gaines' second season as Permian's head coach. It was actually his third season as head coach.
- Boobie Miles, in the book, injured his knee by getting his foot caught on the AstroTurf during a pre-season scrimmage against Amarillo Palo Duro High School at Jones Stadium in Lubbock. In the film, he was tackled by two players at the knee and suffered his career ending injury in the final minutes of a blowout season opening game at Ratliff Stadium against Marshall High School.
- In the film, the top-ranked Permian Panthers defeated the hapless Marshall Bulldogs in a non-district game. In real life, the third-ranked Marshall Mavericks (whose colors are red and white, not purple and gold) defeated fourth-ranked Permian 13–12. In the film, the game was the season opener and played on a Friday night in Odessa. In real life, it was Permian's second game of the season and played at Maverick Stadium in Marshall on a Saturday afternoon. Permian's football team chartered a jet for the 500+ mile trip from Odessa to Marshall, spawning controversy on the cost of the trip. Played before a crowd of more than 12,000 fans at Maverick Stadium, the game was on a searing September afternoon when the temperature topped 100 degrees Fahrenheit (38 °C). The footage shown in the film was from a game against the Midland High Bulldogs, who weren't mentioned in the film. Permian defeated the Dawgs 42–0 in district play, but the two teams ended up in a three-way tie along with Midland Lee for the district title.
- In the film, district play began in week 2. In the real regular season, district play began in week 4.
- In the film, Permian defeated "North Shore Galena" in a mid-season (presumably district) game. In reality, North Shore High School was within the Galena Park Independent School District located in the Houston suburbs over 500 miles (800 km) southeast of Odessa. Although North Shore and Permian have both been 5A football powerhouses, they have never played. Furthermore, North Shore did not start seeing football success until the mid-1990s.
- In reality, the three teams tied for best district record were Permian, Midland Lee, and Midland High, all with 5-1 district records. In the film, Permian and Lee were joined not by Midland but by Abilene Cooper, and each team had two district losses. The tie-breaking coin flip was held at a truck stop outside of Midland, and Midland High lost (Cooper in the film), so Permian and Lee went on. Midland High's missing the playoffs was poignant as it had not been to the playoffs since 1951 and did not get back to post-season play until 2002.
- A Permian player (Mike Winchell) was shown with coach Gaines at the coin toss. In reality, no players from any of the three schools were allowed at the coin toss. All of Permian's players were on the team bus returning from the game that evening at San Angelo Central. Permian assistant coach Mike Belew drove with Gaines from San Angelo to the site of the coin toss.
- In a few scenes, players were shown wearing Under Armour apparel and facemask shields, although in 1988, Under Armour and visors hadn't been invented yet. (Under Armour founder Kevin Plank was in high school in 1988.) The book says they wore green visors, which are now outlawed for high school and college teams.
- In the film, the quarterback for Midland Lee was shown wearing a Riddell Revolution-style football helmet. The brand, Riddell, had been around since 1929, but the design didn't appear until 2002.
- In the film, the annual duel against Permian's archrival Midland Lee was portrayed as Lee having a handy lead throughout the game, with Permian never having a shot at victory. In real life, Lee had to come from behind with a late-game touchdown to win the game 22–21.

=== The playoffs ===
- Permian's first opponent in the playoffs was Amarillo Tascosa and not Dallas Jesuit as in the film. In 1988, Texas Public Schools (such as Permian, Carter, and Tascosa) and private schools (such as Jesuit) competed in separate leagues with separate playoffs. Jesuit was not allowed to join the previously all-public school UIL until 2003, starting football competition in 2004. Dallas Jesuit and Strake Jesuit of Houston were the only private schools who currently play in the UIL, the rest competing in leagues such as TAPPS and the SPC. Also, with the district set up at that time, it would have been impossible for Permian to play a team from the Dallas/Fort Worth Metroplex until the third round of the playoffs. Nowadays, Permian could play Fort Worth-area teams in the first round of the playoffs, but still could not play Jesuit until round 3. Permian played Dallas Jesuit in Odessa during the regular season in 1988, winning 48–2. Jesuit's only points came on a missed-PAT return, which was a rule instituted that year (the defensive conversion was not allowed in high school football under National Federation of State High School Associations rules, but Texas plays by NCAA rules). Jesuit's helmet was shown as white and orange with a sort of wildcat's head logo on it, but in real life, they are solid gold without a logo.
- In the film, it was said that Carter was the state's top-ranked team when Carter was never ranked higher than No. 3 in the Associated Press poll.
- Carter played "Hays" High School in the playoffs, which was depicted as wearing green and white and nicknamed the Rams. The real Jack C. Hays High School, located 15 minutes south of Austin in Buda, used red, white, and blue as its colors, and their nickname was the Rebels. Hays was a Class 4A school in 1988 and did not become 5A until 2000. Hays was in the film because the makers filmed crowd shots at Hays High during a Rebels home game against the Austin Westlake Chaparrals, another team depicted as a Permian playoff victim.
- Permian was depicted as playing "San Angelo" in the quarterfinal round. There were two high schools in the San Angelo Independent School District; until 1998, San Angelo Central High School, the district's only 5A school had been in the same district as Permian (having since been transferred, for football only, to the district with Lubbock and Amarillo schools), and could only have played Permian in the quarterfinal round (owing to the structure of UIL playoffs) if they had qualified. However, Central finished 5th in the district that year, and as only two teams from each district qualified in 1988, Permian and Central did not play in the 1988 playoffs. Instead, Permian played Arlington Lamar in the quarterfinals.
- On the playoff brackets it shows just the word "Baytown". There were two high schools in Baytown in 1988 (there are now three), the team in the playoffs was Baytown Lee.

=== Permian vs. Carter ===
- Since 1982, the UIL Class 5A (now 6A) football playoffs have had six rounds (though a second, parallel playoff bracket of five rounds was added in 1990, later also expanded to six rounds in 2006), so while Permian played Dallas Carter in the fifth round, it was a semi-final and not a final. In the Texas playoffs, a team from North or Western Texas always plays a team from the Houston area or Southern Texas in the final, so the Carter vs Permian final was not possible. The real-life final featured Carter versus Converse Judson (which defeated Permian in the 1995 state championship). The Carter-Permian game was played in front of 10,000 people in a heavy downpour at The University of Texas at Austin's Memorial Stadium, not in front of 55,000 in the Astrodome in Houston. While the game in the film was a high-scoring affair (34–28), the real score was 14–9 in favor of Carter. In real life, Permian held a 9–7 lead for most of the game and Carter made the dramatic fourth-quarter comeback to win. On the last play of the game, Winchell threw the ball incomplete, rather than running it himself close to the goal line.
- The meeting between officials from Permian and Carter at the Midland airport occurred the Sunday prior to the game. Not shown in the film was the Carter officials changing their minds about a home site from Texas Stadium in Irving to the Cotton Bowl within the Dallas city limits. Under UIL rules, if the schools cannot agree to a neutral site, each side picks a "home" site and a "neutral" site, and two coin tosses are conducted. The first was to determine whether a "home" or "neutral" site would be used, and the second was to determine which team's site will be used. After a tense battle between the sides, they agreed to play the game at Austin.
- In the film, Gaines at first suggests San Antonio as a potential neutral site, which would have meant playing the game at Alamo Stadium, since the Alamodome did not open until 1993. The other neutral site suggestion in the film was College Station, presumably meaning Kyle Field at Texas A&M.
- The revocation of Carter's state championship following their use of an academically ineligible player was never mentioned or portrayed, nor was the prolonged legal battle that Carter went through to enable them to play in the playoffs. Officially, the 1988 state champions were Converse Judson, which lost 31–14 in the state championship final to Carter but were eventually declared champions after Carter's championship was revoked.

=== The school and the city ===
- Permian was portrayed in the film as a single large high school in a small, obscure one-horse football obsessed town in West Texas. In reality, Odessa was a respectably large city of nearly 100,000 people at the time of the events portrayed in the film, and part of a sizeable metropolitan area of nearly 250,000 combining the populations of Midland and Ector counties. (The quaint downtown shown in the trailer for the film was actually Manhattan, Kansas which was meticulously decorated by the arts department to look like a small football obsessed Texas town) Also, Permian was (and still is) only one of two large Class 6A high schools in Odessa. The other and first high school in the city, Odessa High School (mascot: the Bronchos), was never mentioned or portrayed in the film, despite the fact that they have played Permian every year, as the two schools have been in the same UIL district since Permian opened in 1959 and shared Ratliff Stadium with Permian and have shared a fierce intercity rivalry for over six decades. An entire chapter in the book was devoted to the "Civil War" between the schools which is one of the most popular games during the football season.
- In the film, Odessa was portrayed as being a mostly Anglo town with a sizable African-American population and virtually no Hispanics. In 1988, out of the almost 100,000 people that lived in Odessa, one-third were Hispanic while African-Americans made up only 5% of the population.
- Ratliff Stadium was depicted as the location for Permian football practices. In reality, the team practiced mostly on campus, and the stadium, used by both Permian and Odessa, was on the outskirts of town in a fairly unpopulated area about three miles (five km) away from the Permian High campus. It was also unlikely that children would be playing touch football near the stadium, as depicted in the film, as few houses were nearby at that time. The area around the stadium has grown dramatically since then (which caused an unintentional anachronism in the film as the houses seen near the stadium did not yet exist in 1988).
- While Ratliff Stadium has had artificial turf since its opening, in 1988 it had the original AstroTurf, not the modern FieldTurf surface seen on the stadium in the film.

== Soundtrack ==
The soundtrack for the film predominantly featured post-rock band Explosions in the Sky. Music by Daniel Lanois and rock band Bad Company were also included. Other songs in the film were "Just Got Paid" by ZZ Top during the montage of the Panthers' road to the finals; the pump-up song featured as the team ran through the tunnel in the game against Dallas Carter was "New Noise" by the seminal Swedish punk band Refused. During the start of the third quarter during the Championship game, the song "I Wanna Be Your Dog" by The Stooges was used. Three songs from Public Enemy's album It Takes a Nation of Millions to Hold Us Back were also used prominently.

== Reception ==
=== Critical reception ===
On Rotten Tomatoes, Friday Night Lights has an approval rating of 82% based on 173 reviews, with an average rating of 7.10/10. The consensus reads: "An acute survey of the football-obsessed heartland that succeeds as both a stirring drama and a rousing sports movie." The film also has a score of 70/100 on Metacritic, based on 35 reviews. Audiences polled by CinemaScore gave the film an average grade of "B+" on an A+ to F scale.

Film critic Roger Ebert awarded the film three and a half out of four stars, writing, "The movie demonstrates the power of sports to involve us; we don't live in Odessa and are watching a game played 16 years ago, and we get all wound up."

Other reviews opined the film seemed to glorify what it was criticizing. Charles Taylor of Salon wrote, “...in the second half, the movie turns into a rah-rah celebration of exactly the mindset it's spent the first half criticizing. All of the bad things that have resulted from the characters' mindless devotion to gridiron glory--the abusive father who stays drunk to forget that the peak of his life came at 17; the barely educated Boobie's having nothing left in his life when a knee injury ends his dream of playing pro -- are converted into obstacles that test the mettle of the young warriors”. Taylor did praise the acting, particularly the performances of Black, Luke, and Thornton.

Earl Ofari Hutchinson of the Los Angeles Times criticized the film for skirting the issue of race relations in Odessa, which Bissinger had gone in depth about in his book. Peter Travers of Rolling Stone awarded the film 3 stars but said it did not sufficiently get into the heads of the players like the book did.

While the residents of Odessa held a negative reception of the book due to its account of race relations in the Texas city, they eagerly anticipated the release of the film.

=== Accolades ===
The film was recognized by American Film Institute in these lists:

- 2004: AFI's Top 10 Film of the Year
- 2008: AFI's 10 Top 10:
  - Nominated Sports Film

== See also ==
- List of American football films
- Carter High
