= Dallas International University =

Christian university in Dallas, Texas, USA

- Type: Undergraduate and Graduate School
- Established: 1998 as Graduate Institute of Applied Linguistics
- President: Scott Berthiaume
- Academic staff: 23 plus adjuncts
- Location: Dallas, Texas, United States; 32.665200°N 96.953289°W
- Website: www.diu.edu

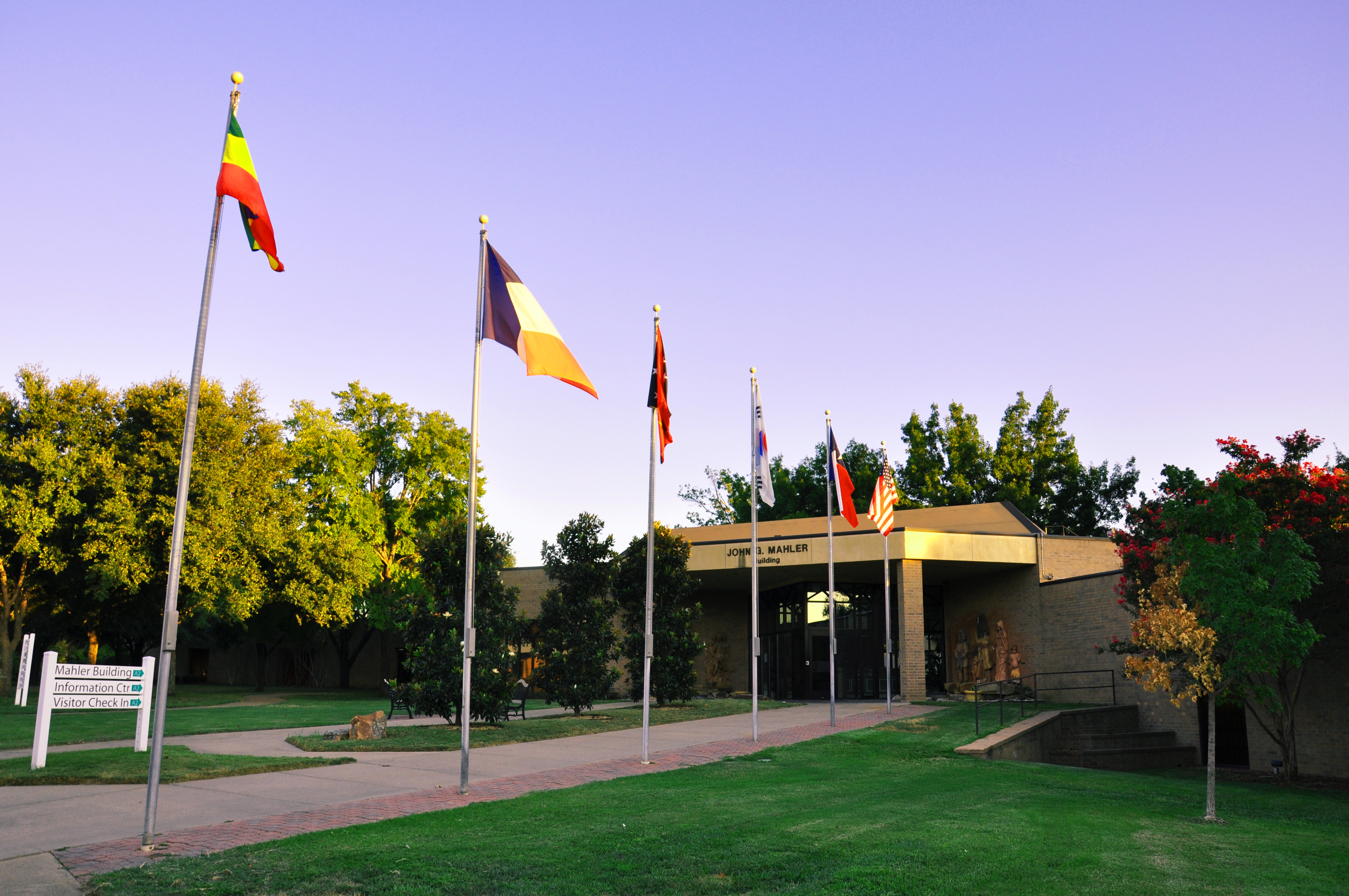
Mahler Building at Dallas International University with flags displayed.

Dallas International University (DIU) is a private non-profit Christian undergraduate school and graduate school located in the southwest corner of Dallas, Texas, formerly called the Graduate Institute of Applied Linguistics. From its beginning in 1998, DIU provided education for applied linguistics and language development work in marginalized language communities around the world.

Dallas International University offers undergraduate and graduate degrees. It also offers certificate programs, such as certificates in sign language linguistics, human migration, Abrahamic studies, and world arts.

== History ==
It was founded in 1998. By 2014, it offered master's and other advanced degrees in linguistics and multilingual and multicultural education.

The name was changed from the founding name of Graduate Institute of Applied Linguistics to Dallas International University in 2018. Since then, in addition to an MA degree program in World Arts (ethnomusicology and other arts) started in 2008, a PhD program achieved accreditation in 2019.

Dallas International University is accredited as a "Level V" university by the Southern Association of Colleges and Schools Commission on Colleges to award BA, MA, and PhD degrees.

== Academic programs ==
Dallas International also offers undergraduate courses leading toward a bachelor’s degree, which may also be taken as post-baccaleareate prerequisites for its graduate programs.

Courses are offered in such areas as language documentation, grammatical analysis, phonology, macro-sociolinguistics, multilingual education, language survey, translation, descriptive linguistics, sign language analysis, and human migration.

== Student body ==
The student body averages around 200 students. Alumni of Dallas International University have gone on to work in over 80 countries.
