= Gil Bartosh =

American football player and coach (1930–2016)

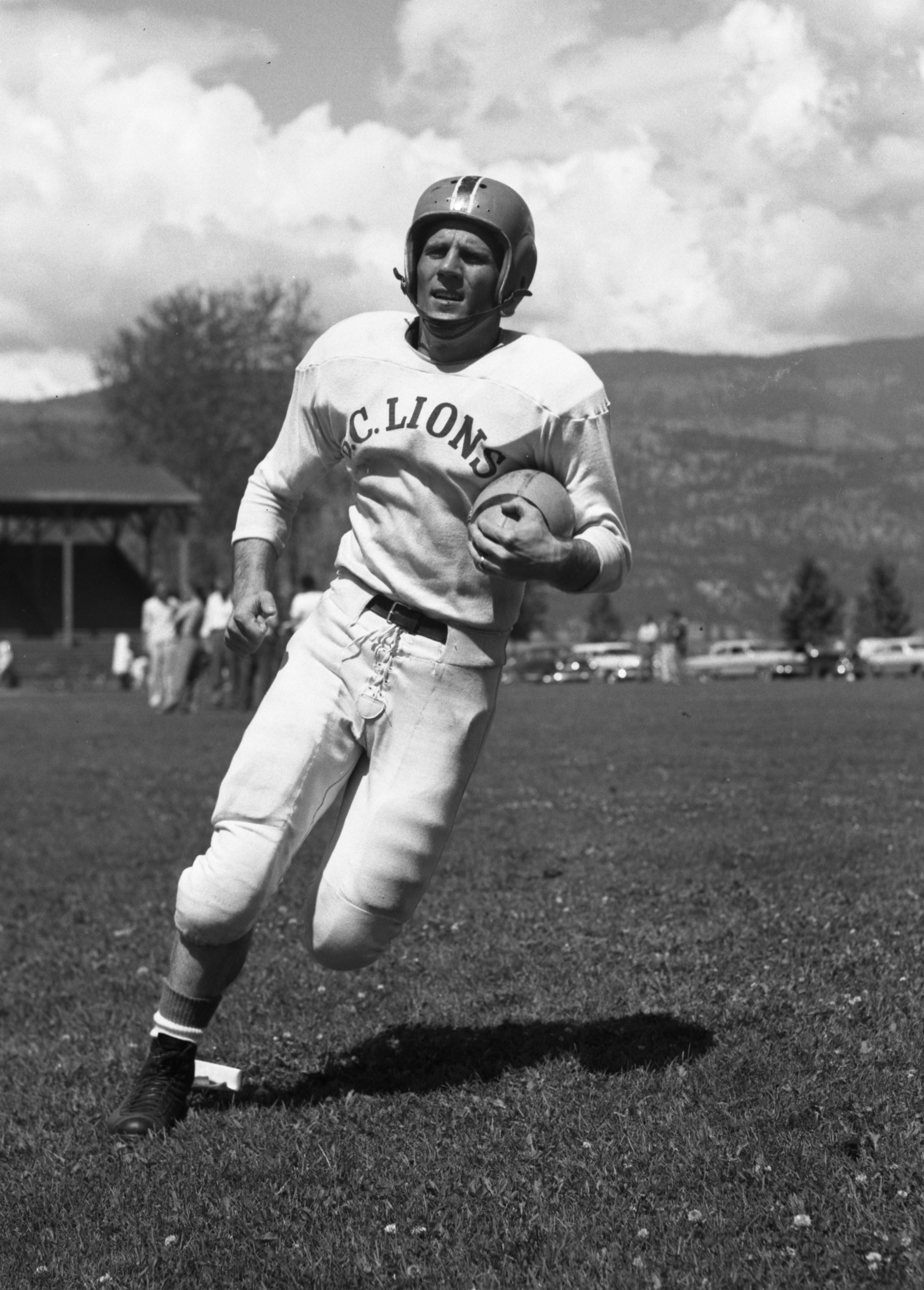
- Bartosh in 1958

Biographical details
- Born: May 21, 1930; Granger, Texas, U.S.
- Died: June 4, 2016 (aged 86); Liberty Hill, Texas, U.S.

Playing career
- 1950–1952: TCU
- 1955: BC Lions
- Position: Quarterback

Coaching career (HC unless noted)
- 1957–1958: Stephen F. Austin HS (TX) (assistant)
- 1959–1961: Milby HS (TX)
- 1962–1966: Lee HS (TX)
- 1967–1970: Rice (assistant)
- 1971–1972: Odessa Permian HS (TX)
- 1973: Texas A&M (RB)
- 1974–1976: UTEP
- 1977: New Mexico (DC)
- 1978–1979: Midland Lee HS (TX)

Head coaching record
- Overall: 6–28 (college); 91–35–3

Accomplishments and honors

Awards
- WAC Coach of the Year (1974); Second-team All-SWC (1950)

Gilbert C. Bartosh Sr. (May 21, 1930 – June 4, 2016) was an American gridiron football player and coach. He played college football for Texas Christian University (TCU) and later played one season professionally in the Canadian Football League (CFL). He then had a lengthy coaching career, during which he served as the head football coach at the University of Texas at El Paso (UTEP) from 1974 to 1976, compiling a record of 6–28.

== Biography ==
Considered the greatest player ever to come out of Granger High School, Bartosh was dubbed the "Granger Ghost." He starred at Granger from 1945 to 1948, then played three varsity seasons with the TCU Horned Frogs football program. At TCU, he played quarterback under coach Dutch Meyer and led the Southwest Conference in total offense during 1951, his junior season. In 1952, however, he had to take a backseat behind Ray McKown. Bartosh was selected by the Baltimore Colts as the 314th pick (round 27) of the 1952 NFL draft, but never played in the NFL. He did play in the Canadian Football League (CFL) for the British Columbia Lions in 1955, leading the team in touchdowns.

After suffering a shoulder injury during one of his practices, Bartosh quit professional football and started his coaching career. Bartosh was the head football coach at Milby High School in Houston, Texas, from 1959 to 1961, winning two District Championships. In 1962, he became head coach at the newly opened Lee High School, Houston, serving there through the 1966 season. His 1964 and 1965 teams were zone champions. After a three-year stint as assistant at Rice University, he became head coach at Permian High School in Odessa, Texas, in 1971. Bartosh guided Permian to an undefeated 14–0 season in 1972, winning the Texas 5A state championship as well as the mythical high school football national championship along the way. He then left Permian for an assistant coaching job under Emory Bellard at Texas A&M University. In 1974, he succeeded Tommy Hudspeth as head coach at the University of Texas at El Paso (UTEP).

Bartosh was inducted into the Texas High School Football Hall of Fame in 1989. He died on June 4, 2016, in Liberty Hill, Texas, where he lived.

== Head coaching record ==
=== College ===
Year	Team	Overall	Conference	Standing	Bowl/playoffs
UTEP Miners (Western Athletic Conference) (1974–1976)
1974	UTEP	4–7	3–4	T–4th	
1975	UTEP	1–10	0–6	8th	
1976	UTEP	1–11	0–7	8th	
UTEP:		6–28	3–17		
Total:		6–28			

=== High school ===
Year	Team	Overall	Conference	Standing	Bowl/playoffs
Milby Buffs () (1959–1961)
1959	Milby	6–4			
1960	Milby	7–3–1		1st	
1961	Milby	11–1		1st	
Milby:		24–8–1			
Lee Generals () (1962–1966)
1962	Lee	3–7			
1963	Lee	7–3			
1964	Lee	7–4			
1965	Lee	6–4–1			
1966	Lee	6–3–1			
Lee:		29–21–2			
Permian Panthers () (1971–1972)
1971	Permian	9–1			
1972	Permian	14–0		1st	
Permian:		23–1			
Midland Lee Rebels () (1978–1979)
1978	Midland Lee	8–2			
1979	Midland Lee	7–3			
Midland Lee:		15–5			
Total:		91–35–3			
National championship Conference title Conference division title or championship game berth
