= Friday Night Lights: A Town, a Team, and a Dream =

1990 nonfiction book by Buzz Bissinger

- Author: H. G. Bissinger
- Language: English
- Publisher: Addison-Wesley
- Publication date: 1990
- Publication place: United States
- Pages: 419 pages
- ISBN: 0-201-19677-8
- OCLC: 21408817
- Dewey Decimal: 796.332/63/09764862 20
- LC Class: GV958.P47 B57 1990
- Followed by: A Prayer for the City (1998)

Friday Night Lights: A Town, a Team, and a Dream is a 1990 non-fiction book of immersive journalism written by H. G. Bissinger, following the story of the 1988 Permian High School Panthers football team from Odessa, Texas, as they made a run towards the Texas state championship. While originally intended to be a Hoosiers-type chronicle of high school sports holding together a small town, it ends up as a critical commentary of town life in Odessa. It was later adapted into a short-lived 1993 television series, a 2004 feature film, and a second 2006–11 television series.

== Inspiration ==
Bissinger was a journalist for The Philadelphia Inquirer when he was selected as a Harvard Nieman Fellow. It was while he was at Harvard that the idea to write a book focused upon the role high school football plays within American society, in particular rural society, took hold. Bissinger returned to The Inquirer briefly, received a Pulitzer Prize, and then took off in search of a community for which high school football was paramount. He settled on Odessa, Texas. Permian High School and its football team, the Permian Panthers, had a substantial, rich history of winning in Texas' 4A and 5A divisions, (Note: The divisions denote the size of student enrollment in the high schools of Texas, with 1A signifying the smallest schools and 6A, added during a 2013 reclassification by the Texas University Interscholastic League (UIL), denoting the largest schools. The concept is that larger enrollments means a larger pool of quality athletes to choose from, likely (but not exclusively) resulting in the progressively higher-numbered divisions having the progressively stronger teams in the state. Schools, such as Permian, can be moved to a different division based on changes in enrollment over time or changes to the overall UIL system over time.) having won championships in 1965, 1972, 1980, and 1984. Bissinger moved his family to Odessa and spent the entire 1988 football season with the Permian Panther players, their families, their coaches, and even many of the townspeople in an effort to understand the town and its football-mad culture.

== Characters ==
- James "Boobie" Miles – Star fullback for Odessa Permian High heading into the 1988 season. The previous season he had rushed for 1,385 yards and showed flashes of brilliance. This season would be the season for him to shine and lead the team to a Texas state championship. Boobie was being heavily recruited by major college football programs such as Nebraska, Oklahoma, Arkansas, Texas A&M and USC and had professional football aspirations before suffering a knee injury in the preseason. He would never recover 100% and eventually quit the team in a rage.
- Mike Winchell – Starting quarterback for the Panthers. He is portrayed by Bissinger as a boy who is mostly level-headed, but prone to nerves. His play is unspectacular but effective. He feels a lot of pressure from the town and peers alike.
- Brian Chavez – A very intelligent player. He is valedictorian of his class and attends Harvard University after graduating from Permian. He is a tight end and defensive lineman. He is mostly seen as an example of the good in Odessa, a diamond among rocks.
- Ivory Christian – A linebacker for the Panthers. A punishing hitter with excellent reflexes and athleticism, Christian is a religious person. He struggles to enjoy playing football, realizing that there should be more to life and spends much of his time in thought. He is the only senior player from the 1988 Panther football team to receive a Division I football scholarship, attending Texas Christian University.
- Don Billingsley – A Permian halfback who frequently finds himself in trouble with the coaches. His father is a local legend for being a star player for Permian in the late 1960s, though Don is known more for his off the field activities, which at the time included drinking, fighting, and womanizing.
- Jerrod McDougal – A Permian offensive tackle, who has sacrificed a lot to become varsity for Permian and, at 5'9", knows he is too small to play at the college level, so practices several times a day to bring himself to an advantage.
- Gary Gaines – Head coach for Permian. A bright football mind who constantly deals with the pressures from the fans, the booster club, and the lofty expectations of being head coach for Permian.

== Summary ==
In the 1988 5A playoff semifinals, Permian meets Dallas Carter Cowboys, a predominantly black team. In a hard fought game in the rain at Memorial Stadium in Austin, the Panthers are defeated 14–9. Dallas Carter, led by future Miami Hurricanes and New York Giants linebacker Jessie Armstead, goes on to win the state championship, 31-14 over the Judson Rockets from Converse; Dallas Carter soon faced severe penalties for their grade tampering, giving the 1988 state championship to Judson.

== Chapters ==
Prologue

Bissinger discusses the Midland Lee game, as Permian's arch rival. The game is played on October 28, 1988. He introduces the characters of Gary Gaines, Mike Winchell, Don Billingsley, Boobie Miles, Ivory Christian, Brian Chavez and Jerrod McDougal and gives insight into their personalities, thoughts and their pregame rituals. Former star, Boobie knows his performance against Midland Lee will be important for his future. He hasn't played well since August when he injured his knee in a preseason scrimmage, but the coaches never put Boobie in the game. Permian puts up a valiant fight but lose 22–21. After the game, a furious Boobie storms out of the locker room and quits the team two days later.

Chapter 1: Odessa

Bissinger begins the book at the start of the 1988 football season in August and how Gaines is preparing for it. Bissinger then chronicles the history of Odessa. It was founded in the 1880s by land speculators from Zanesville, Ohio. They advertised the land as being as fertile farmland like in Kansas and Iowa. However, the settlers quickly discovered that it was dry and arid. The town saw little growth until 1926 when oil was discovered in the Permian Basin (hence the high school's name). Almost overnight, the town boomed and it saw more growth in a month than it had seen in ten years. The population increased dramatically and money was everywhere. In town, the roads were so muddy that the oil workers, (nicknamed boomers), often had to bring in cattle to pull the equipment to the oil fields. According to the book, "diarrhea, lawlessness, overcrowding, bad water, prostitution, and a rat problem" plagued the town. Out in the oil fields, the boomers worked round the clock to make their money. Meanwhile, Odessa High School's football team garnered success by winning the state championship in 1946 and making it back to the championship in 1953, thus laying the foundation for football fanaticism. Another boom in the 1950s led to the opening of Permian High School in 1959. Permian proved quickly that it was not going to play second to Odessa High. They became known as the embodiment of Odessa: small, white and overachieving. Meanwhile, due to demographic shifts and oddly drawn boundaries, Odessa High became populated with mainly poor whites and poor Hispanics—while a substantial majority of the city's relatively small black population ended up in the Permian attendance zone. This is not to say, however, that Permian didn't have its share of poor people from all major ethnic groups.

Chapter 2: The Watermelon Feed

Bissinger talks about the Watermelon Feed held at Permian in August as a preseason celebration. He then chronicles the history of Permian football. Since its founding in 1959, it had won the state championship in 1965, 1972, 1980 and 1984. Despite the fact that it only won one state championship in the 1970s, Permian had statistically been the winningest team in the state of Texas. Bissinger then discusses the pressure that Gaines is constantly under because of how intensely devoted the Permian fans are. High school football is used as a distraction for the once thriving community of Odessa which had gone into a slump when the second boom ended.

Chapter 3: Boobie

This chapter focuses upon the black star fullback, James "Boobie" Miles, who is Permian's ticket to the state championship. Bissinger uses Boobie as an example of the negative effect high school football can have its players. Boobie is not a good student and doesn't have to worry about grades because he will most likely get a football scholarship to a major college. The dream seems all too real until, in August, during a scrimmage in Lubbock, Boobie injured his knee. With the season opener only a week away, no one knows what to do. Now the pressure is on quarterback Mike Winchell. Meanwhile, junior running back Chris Comer is called up to replace Boobie.

Chapter 4: Dreaming of Heroes

This chapter focuses upon the life of Mike Winchell, Permian's starting quarterback. Mike lived with his mother. His father, Billy, died when Mike was just thirteen. Billy had always been keen on Mike's playing football when he was a little kid. Mike's older brother, Joe Bill, took over that role but, in 1988, Joe Bill had moved out. Mike was very intelligent and received an offer of admission from Brown University but had prospects of playing football only at a smaller college. Don Billingsley is Permian's starting Tailback and son of the legendary Charlie Billingsley who played football in the 1960s. Don, whose mother had been a Permian cheerleader while Charlie played football, moved from Blanchard, Oklahoma to Odessa in 1986 before his sophomore year. Don and Charlie had always had a rocky relationship but it was all made better by football. Don was always inspired by his father's stories and always tried to live up to him. Yet, sometimes he faltered because he sometimes fumbled the ball on key plays.

Chapter 5: Black and White

Bissinger discusses the issue of race relations in Odessa which he describes as the ugliest racism he had ever witnessed. The town didn't desegregate until the 1980s and even then the schools were racially divided. Many viewed football as exploiting the talented black athletes by using them and then spitting them out afterwards.

Chapter 6: The Ambivalence of Ivory

Bissinger begins by discussing the life of Permian linebacker Ivory Christian. He originally thought he would go to Ector High School, where many poor blacks went, until Permian was desegregated in the early 1980s. Ivory had ambitions of becoming a minister at a Baptist church. Ivory gains these ambitions when he has a life changing dream that involves a dark tunnel and light. Because of this dream, Ivory decides that he will change his partying ways and turn his life over to God. Because of this decision, he becomes ambivalent towards football, what it represents, and for its beginning the inner battle between Homeric and Christian values.

Chapter 7: School Days

Bissinger spends the chapter discussing the situation at Permian High School. He highlights the misplaced priorities as well as bad spending. More money is spent on sports medical supplies than the entire English department. The teachers make less money than the coaches who are financially at the mercy of the boosters who seldom care about education. Permian's SAT scores have plummeted dramatically since the 1970s and no one seems to care as long as Permian wins football games. As a result, everyone including the football players suffers. As the season progresses, Permian begins winning games.

Chapter 8: East versus West

Bissinger discusses the Permian–Odessa High game. The cross town rivalry is fueled by the cultural difference between the schools. For one thing, Permian also got the majority of the Ector County education budget while Odessa High typically got what was left (which wasn't that much). Odessa High had once been the beacon of hope in the city. It won the 1946 state championship and did well overall. Then, Permian opened in 1959. The middle class whites went to Permian and the Mexicans went to Odessa High. Also, Permian hasn't lost to Odessa in over twenty years. Permian wins the game 35–7.

Chapter 9: Friday Night Politics

Bissinger discusses the political views in Odessa which has long been a Republican voting city. The 1988 election is coming up and it is clear that majority of its residents are going to vote for Republican candidate and then Vice President George H. W. Bush, who lived in the area in the 1940s and 1950s. They had loved Ronald Reagan so the choice was clear. Many view Democratic candidate Michael Dukakis as far too liberal and think he is out to destroy their way of life from his comfortable home in Massachusetts. Meanwhile, Permian rolls over Midland High School winning 35–0. Bissinger also discusses the life of Brian Chavez, the Permian tight end. Chavez is extremely smart and has ambitions of going to Harvard. His father Tony is a successful lawyer originally from El Paso, Texas. Tony had enlisted in the United States Army after high school. After he was discharged, he took his GI Bill money and decided to take law classes at Texas Tech in Lubbock eventually graduating with a law degree in 1978. He supported the family by working as a police officer in El Paso. On his trips between the two cities, he drove through Odessa and thought it was dirty, seedy and trashy, and so decided to work in Midland. However, once he graduated, he got a job offer in Odessa and moved his family there. In 1982, the family moved to the Country Club estates, the nicest part of town. Tony was, in many ways, the embodiment of the American dream.

Chapter 10: Boobie Who?

Bissinger discusses Boobie's football career after his injury. He thought the injury wasn't that serious and constantly tried to convince the coaches he could play. He played as a backup in several games but never got any serious playing time. But as Boobie's career is falling Mike Winchell's is soaring.

Chapter 11: Sisters

Bissinger discusses the Permian-Midland Lee rivalry. Even though the two towns were similar, the hatred ran deep. Odessans viewed Midland as a town full of rich snobs and Midlanders view Odessa as a city full of rednecks, money burners and drunks. In 1983 an article in Forbes magazine named Midland one of the nicest places to live in America. At the same time, Newsweek named Odessa "Murder Capital U.S.A." with a record 29.8 murders per 100,000 residents. Bissinger traces the roots of the hatred to the second oil boom of the late 1970s and early 1980s. The boom had been brought by the oil embargo by OPEC as well as the Iranian Revolution, the 1973 Oil Crisis, the 1979 Energy Crisis and the Carter Energy Policy. Oil prices skyrocketed and for the second time in forty years the boom was on. People were making money left and right in both Midland and Odessa. There were stories of welders who could barely read making as much as $90,000 a year. Stories abounded of businessmen buying Lear jets and building huge homes for no other reason than the fact that they could. The oil executives thought they were in control of everything and didn't realize it was all circumstantial. Once the embargo ended, the boom was over. The final nail in the coffin was the closing of the First National Bank of Midland in October 1983 as a result of the 1980s oil glut and the Permian Basin never fully recovered. Bissinger also discusses the effects that the Reagan 1980s had on the Odessa-Midland Area.

Chapter 12: Civil War

After Permian loses to Midland Lee the fate of the season is unclear. Gaines is now under tremendous pressure and wonders if he will still have a job in a year's time. In two seasons Gaines had only gotten as far as the third round of playoffs. Boobie Miles quietly quits the team. Meanwhile, Jerrod McDougal, the Permian defensive tackle who knew he wouldn't play football in college, was devastated at the prospect of the season ending so early. Permian, Midland High and Midland Lee are all tied with one district loss each and only two can go to represent the district in the 1988 playoffs. It will be decided in a coin toss.

Chapter 13: Heads or Tails

Permian ends the regular season beating the San Angelo Central Bobcats 41–7. But now it all comes down to a coin toss. Coach Gaines and Mike Belew drive to meet the head coaches of Midland High and Midland Lee. The event is held at a truck stop on the south side of Midland at 2:00 am local time. The location is undisclosed and it is broadcast live on TV. When the coin toss finally happens there it is originally thought to be a tie. Then it turns out that Permian and Midland Lee landed heads and Midland High landed tails. The two teams will continue their seasons while Midland High's season is over.

Chapter 14: Friday Night Addiction

The playoffs have finally arrived. Permian first defeats Tascosa High School in Amarillo 21–7. They then play Andress High School in El Paso in the Sun Bowl, winning 41–13. The Saturday after Thanksgiving, Permian beats the Irving Nimitz Vikings, a team ranked sixth in the state, 41–7. Bissinger also explores the fates of many famous Permian players and how many of them ended right back in Odessa. He cites these stories as key examples of the false world Permian football can have on its players. Permian then beats Arlington Lamar 21–7. But now it was on to play the team many called the best high school football team in the state if not the country—the David W. Carter High School Cowboys from Dallas.

Chapter 15: The Algebraic Equation

Bissinger spends the chapter discussing the football players at Dallas Carter High School, which is an all-black upper-middle-class high school. The football obsession at Carter dwarfs the one at Permian. Players skipped classes, left school to get lunch, and had their grades fixed by teachers so that they could play. This led to a court case when a teacher, Will Bates, refused to lie about the algebra grade of a key player, Gary Edwards. The case was won and Dallas Carter got to continue their season. During the week of the game the coaches from Permian and Dallas Carter meet to decide where the game will be played. They eventually agree on Texas Memorial Stadium at the University of Texas at Austin. They also agree on a racially mixed officiating crew to minimize any possible bias from that source.

Chapter 16: Field of Dreams

Permian plays Dallas Carter on December 17, 1988. The game is extremely close with Permian initially ahead. Don Billingsley makes some great tackles. Ivory Christian makes an interception. Jerrod McDougal blocks exceptionally well, and Chris Comer moves the ball exceptionally well. But then a bad call in which the football bounced off the artificial turf of the field into a Carter receiver's hand. Carter then scores. Permian is now down 14–9. As the game draws to an end in the fourth quarter Permian gains the ball and starts gaining yards fast until finally the final seconds of the game are at hand with Permian on the Carter 24-yard line. Winchell gets ready to pass to Robert Brown. The ball is snapped, Winchell looks to Brown and throws the ball. It is incomplete. Permian loses 14–9. For the players, high school football is over and a big part of their lives has just ended. Right after the game the team heads home. McDougal, who loved football to death, lingered in the team locker room for a little longer than everyone else but eventually left to the locker room. Then Gaines and the coaches took down the magnetic names on the board. Bissinger ends the chapter saying, "The season had ended, but another one had begun. People everywhere, young and old were already dreaming of heroes."

Epilogue

A week later, Dallas Carter won the 1988 Texas state championship. For the players, the sense of entitlement and the feeling that they could do whatever they wanted to reach an all-time high. Gary Edwards got a full scholarship to the University of Houston. However, in May 1989, Edwards and several other players committed an armed robbery in Dallas. They were arrested and they were tried in September. It was then discovered they had committed as many as ten robberies prior. Edwards, who initially thought he would just get probation, was sentenced to 16 years in prison. After some review it was decided that because of grade changing on the player's action, Dallas Carter was stripped of its state championship.

Bissinger then discusses the fates of the 1988 Permian Panthers. Brian Chavez went to Harvard but quit the football team after only one day because there was no bond. He instead decided to play rugby. Boobie Miles played football at Ranger College, a junior college. Jerrod McDougal attended Odessa College and then Midland College. Although he missed football he could find happiness in the knowledge that Permian football would go on forever. Don Billingsley went back to Oklahoma and at first played football for East Central University but then he severely injured his knee and needed surgery. Ivory Christian went to play for Texas Christian University but quit playing football after his freshman year. Mike Winchell played football for Baylor University but said it wasn't as great as Permian and lost a lot of his abilities.

1989 saw the price of oil rise as high as $20 a barrel. Yet that same year saw 46% of the nation's oil imported, the highest in twelve years. As a result, West Texas continued to suffer economically. That year Odessa was named the second-worst place to live in America by the Places Rated Almanac. Meanwhile, Permian was dominating on the football field. They redeemed themselves, beating Midland Lee 17–13. Permian continued to win in the playoffs and eventually got to the state championship. Among the players was quarterback Stoney Case who would eventually go on to play in the NFL for the Arizona Cardinals and Baltimore Ravens. Before the game Gary Gaines told the players, "Everybody in this room has paid a dear, dear price. That ought to make your effort that much more intense, that much more fanatical, because of all the hard work and sacrifice that's gone into getting you here. It ought to make you play that much harder. You represent a lot of people. We're gonna represent them well and we're gonna win this sucker!" The players then took the field. Odessa had gone through a ridiculous amount of change in the 1980s going from a place where anything was possible to a place where nothing was certain and everything was finite. Yet football had always been there. Bissinger ends the book by saying, "It would always go on just as Jerrod McDougal had realized, because it was a way of life. The Permian Panthers ended the decade the same way they had begun it. Two days before Christmas, they became the state football champions of Texas."

== Investigation ==
While Bissinger, who had taken a leave of absence from reporting for The Philadelphia Inquirer to follow the team and write Friday Night Lights, was writing the book, the University Interscholastic League (UIL) investigated the Permian Panthers football program, alleging that Bissinger took players out to eat and paid for the meals while interviewing them for the book, a violation of amateur rules. It was reported that he also paid for Boobie Miles's car in exchange for an interview.

== Reception ==
The book's release during the 1990 season coincided with the investigation of the team for holding illegal off-season practices, which resulted in the team being declared ineligible for the playoffs and thus not participating in the post season for only the second time since 1980. Permian's absence from the playoffs allowed San Angelo Central into the playoffs for only the 3rd time since 1966. The negative reaction to the playoff situation was exacerbated by the book, and many residents of Odessa received the book with responses ranging from mild indignation to threats of physical violence aimed at the book's author.

In response to the negative reaction in Odessa, a local bookstore cancelled a book signing by the author, and T-shirts possessed by locals bore the words, "Buzz off, Bissinger".

However, over time, the accuracy of the story has held up. The book has been reprinted frequently, including a 2000 reprint with a new afterword by the author detailing the team's accomplishments in the early part of the 1990s followed by the demise of the program in the latter part of the decade.

In 2002, Sports Illustrated named Friday Night Lights the fourth-greatest book ever written about sports, and its fourth place position made it the highest rated book focusing on football. In 2015, the book was reissued as a 25th anniversary edition and included a new afterword by Bissinger in which he provided an update on players from Odessa's 1988 team.

In 2012, Buzz Bissinger published a 34-page afterword called "After Friday Night Lights", which has Bissinger visiting with Miles and discussing their 25-year friendship.

=== Censorship ===
Friday Night Lights has been a frequent target of censors; the book appears on the American Library Association list of the 100 Most Frequently Challenged Books of 2000–2009 at number 89.

== Legacy ==
The book inspired the short-lived television series Against the Grain (1993) starring a young Ben Affleck.

A movie version of Friday Night Lights was made and then released in the United States on October 8, 2004. It starred Billy Bob Thornton as Permian Coach Gary Gaines. The film was a box office and critical success and, in turn, spawned the NBC television series of the same name, which ran for five seasons from 2006 to 2011.

In 2021, the book's original photographer, Robert Clark, published Friday Night Lives, a visual follow-up featuring previously unpublished photographs from the 1988 season alongside new portraits of the players decades later.
