= John T. Wilkins III =

American politician

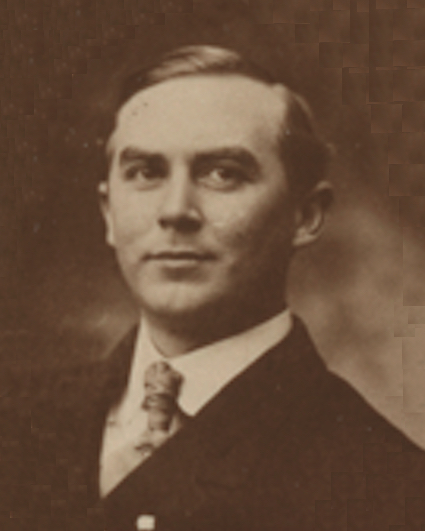

Member of the Virginia House of Delegates for Northampton and Accomac
- In office January 10, 1906 – January 12, 1910
- Preceded by: Charles Smith
- Succeeded by: W. Bullitt Fitzhugh

Personal details
- Born: John Trower Wilkins III; October 15, 1880
- Died: October 9, 1929 (aged 48)
- Party: Democratic
- Spouse: Margaret Costin Spady

John Trower Wilkins III (October 15, 1880 – October 9, 1929) was an American politician who served in the Virginia House of Delegates.
