= Freddie James =

American football coach (1937–2026)

Biographical details
- Born: 1937
- Died: October 29, 2026 (aged 89)

Playing career
- late 1950s: Prairie View A&M

Coaching career (HC unless noted)
- 1982–1995: David W. Carter HS (TX)

Head coaching record
- Overall: 147–28–4

Freddie James (1937 – October 29, 2026) was an American football coach. He played college football under Billy Nicks at Prairie View A&M University in the late 1950s, before working in a steel plant for a couple of years, then as a physical therapist in Houston. His former coach Nicks later recommended him for high school football coaching. In 1982, James became head coach at David W. Carter High School in Dallas. In his first year, Carter reached the 5A state semifinals. In 1988, Carter won the title after one of the most dominant seasons in Texas high school football, but the title was later forfeited because of eligibility infringements. After a ban from the state playoffs in 1989, because James had played an ineligible player, Carter reached the state semis again in 1990. He retired after the 1995 season, having guided the Carter Cowboys to a 123–22–3 record in his 14 seasons, and having turned the program into a nationally recognized power. His overall coaching record stands at 147–28–4.

James was inducted to the Texas Black Sports Hall of Fame with the inaugural class, in 1996. He was portrayed in the 2004 movie Friday Night Lights by actor Julius Tennon. He was also portrayed in the 2015 film Carter High by Charles S. Dutton, which portrayed Carter's 1988 season.

James died on October 29, 2026, at the age of 89.
