= Permian High School =

Coordinates: 31°53′12″N 102°21′30″W

- 1800 E. 42nd Street; Odessa, Texas 79762-5800; United States

Information
- Type: Public, Non-sectarian and coeducational secondary education institution
- Established: 1959; 67 years ago
- School district: Ector County Independent School District
- Principal: Megan Watts
- Staff: 208.58 (FTE)
- Grades: 9-12
- Enrollment: 4,138 (2024–2025)
- Student to teacher ratio: 19.84
- Campus type: Public School
- Colors: Black and White
- Athletics conference: UIL Class 6A
- Mascot: Panther
- Nickname: MOJO
- Website: Permian High School

Permian High School is a public high school located in Odessa, Texas and is one of two high schools in the Ector County Independent School District. It was the subject of the book Friday Night Lights, which in turn inspired a movie and TV series of the same name.

== History ==
Opened in 1959, Permian High is named for the Permian Basin, the geological formation that underlies Midland and Odessa. The name stems from the age of the rocks in the basin where the school is located, which are from the geological period that preceded the largest mass extinction in the history of life. The Permian Basin is the source of the large oil and natural gas deposits that drive the region's economy. Permian High began adding freshmen to the campus during the 2015-2016 school year. This began creating more additions to the campus as well as a bigger influx of students.

== Athletics ==
=== Football ===
High school football has long been extremely popular in Texas. The story of Permian High School's 1988 Permian Panthers team and its run towards the state championship was the subject of the best-selling book Friday Night Lights, written by H. G. Bissinger and photographed by Robert Clark, published in 1990. A movie based on the book was made in 2004 and the NBC television network aired a TV series loosely based on the school and book. Roy Williams, formerly of the Detroit Lions, Dallas Cowboys, and Chicago Bears, went to school at Permian and portrayed an assistant coach for Midland Lee in the movie.

The team, whose rallying cry is "Mojo", won the Texas state championship in the 4A classification (the state's largest until 1980) in 1965 and 1972 and the 5A classification in 1980, 1984 (a co-championship with French High School, located in Beaumont, Texas the last time that a football co-championship was awarded by the UIL; it would later adopt NCAA overtime rules), 1989 and 1991. Permian was selected by National Sports News Service as the High School Football National co-champions in 1972 and 1989.

- State Champions: 1965 (4A), 1972 (4A), 1980 (5A), 1984 co-champs (5A), 1989 (5A), 1991 (5A II)

"Mojo" supposedly originated in 1967 when a group of Permian alumni met the team in Abilene Cooper for the game between the Panthers and Cougars. Legend has it that Permian's fans began chanting "Go Joe" for one of the Permian players. Other fans misheard this as "Mojo".

Permian plays its home football games at Ratliff Stadium.

==== Coaching history ====
Coaches have included:

- Gene Mayfield (1965–1970)
- Gil Bartosh (1971–1972)
- John Wilkins (1973–1985)
- Gary Gaines (1986–1989 and 2009–2012)
- Tam Hollingshead (1990–1993)

== Activities ==
=== Satin Strings ===
Founded by Charles Nail and currently directed by Todd Berridge, a former pupil under Nail, Satin Strings is a strolling strings ensemble of the Permian High School Orchestra. The members of the group "stroll" (carry their instruments while performing), including the cellists but not the bass players.

Satin Strings is regularly asked to play at major state and national functions. In 1994, Satin Strings played at the D-Day celebrations in Normandy, France and this performance led to an invitation to play at the 1997 inauguration of US President Bill Clinton. The ensemble played for the inauguration of the governor of Chihuahua, Mexico in 1998. The group also performed at the 2001 and 2005 inaugurations of President George W. Bush. Satin Strings and director Berridge are featured on the May 4, 2013 episode of the syndicated television series Texas Country Reporter, starring Bob Phillips.

=== Orchestra ===
The Permian Orchestra was founded in 1959 with the opening of Permian High School. Under the baton of J.R. McEntyre, the program quickly gained a reputation for excellence that has endured for half a century. The Symphony Orchestra has received consecutive sweepstakes at UIL Concert and Sightreading Contest for 41 years. The Chamber String Orchestra (Satin Strings) has received sweepstakes at UIL Concert and Sightreading contest for 25 years, every year since the founding of it. The Symphony, Philharmonic and Chamber String Orchestras have each achieved individual success at festivals across the nation. The groups have been named "Best in Class" and "Outstanding Orchestra" at competitions in Arizona, California, Colorado, Florida, Georgia, Missouri, New Mexico, Oklahoma and Texas. The Permian Symphony Orchestra has been selected as the TMEA State Honor Orchestra twice, once in 1980 and again in 1984. The orchestra program has only had five directors in its history: J.R. McEntrye (1959–72), Charles Nail (1972–88), Kathy Fishburn (1988–99), David Golden (1999–2008), and Todd Berridge (2008–present).

== Notable alumni ==
- Raymond Benson – Thriller novelist and author of the official James Bond novels from 1997 to 2003
- Jim J. Bullock – Stage, television and film actor
- Bront Bird – NFL linebacker for the San Diego Chargers
- Stoney Case – Former NFL and Arena Football League quarterback
- Mike Conaway – United States House of Representatives member from Texas's 11th congressional district
- Mike Flynt – Former NCAA Football linebacker for Sul Ross State University
- Britt Hager – Former NFL linebacker
- Daniel Ray Herrera – MLB pitcher, most recently played for the New York Mets.
- Lloyd Hill – Former NFL and Arena Football League wide receiver.
- Daryl Hunt – Played football for the Houston Oilers and was an All-American at the University of Oklahoma.
- Brooks Landgraf – politician
- Boobie Miles – Featured in Friday Night Lights
- Jesus Olivares – World champion powerlifter
- Robert Rummel-Hudson – Author of Schuyler's Monster
- Kimberly Kay Smith – Actress and model
- Toby Stevenson – Pole vaulter, 2004 Summer Olympics silver medalist
- Roy Williams – Former NFL wide receiver for the Detroit Lions, Dallas Cowboys, and Chicago Bears
- Kelly Wilson – Women's Professional Soccer forward currently playing for Philadelphia Independence and member of the United States women's national soccer team

== Bibliography ==
- Bissinger, H.G. (1991). Friday Night Lights: A Town, a Team, and a Dream. New York: HarperPerennial. ISBN 0-06-097406-0.
- McCally, Regina W. (1986). The Secret of Mojo: The Story of the Odessa, Texas, Permian High School Football Team. Fort Worth: McCally.
