= Early Independent School District =

School district based in Early, Texas (USA)

Early Independent School District is a public school district based in Early, Texas (USA).

The district includes Early, and a section of Brownwood which contains Brownwood Regional Airport.

In 2009, the school district was rated "recognized" by the Texas Education Agency.

== Schools ==
The District includes:

- Early Primary School
- Early Elementary School
- Early Middle School
- Early High School
