= Kenny Vaccaro =

American football player (born 1991)

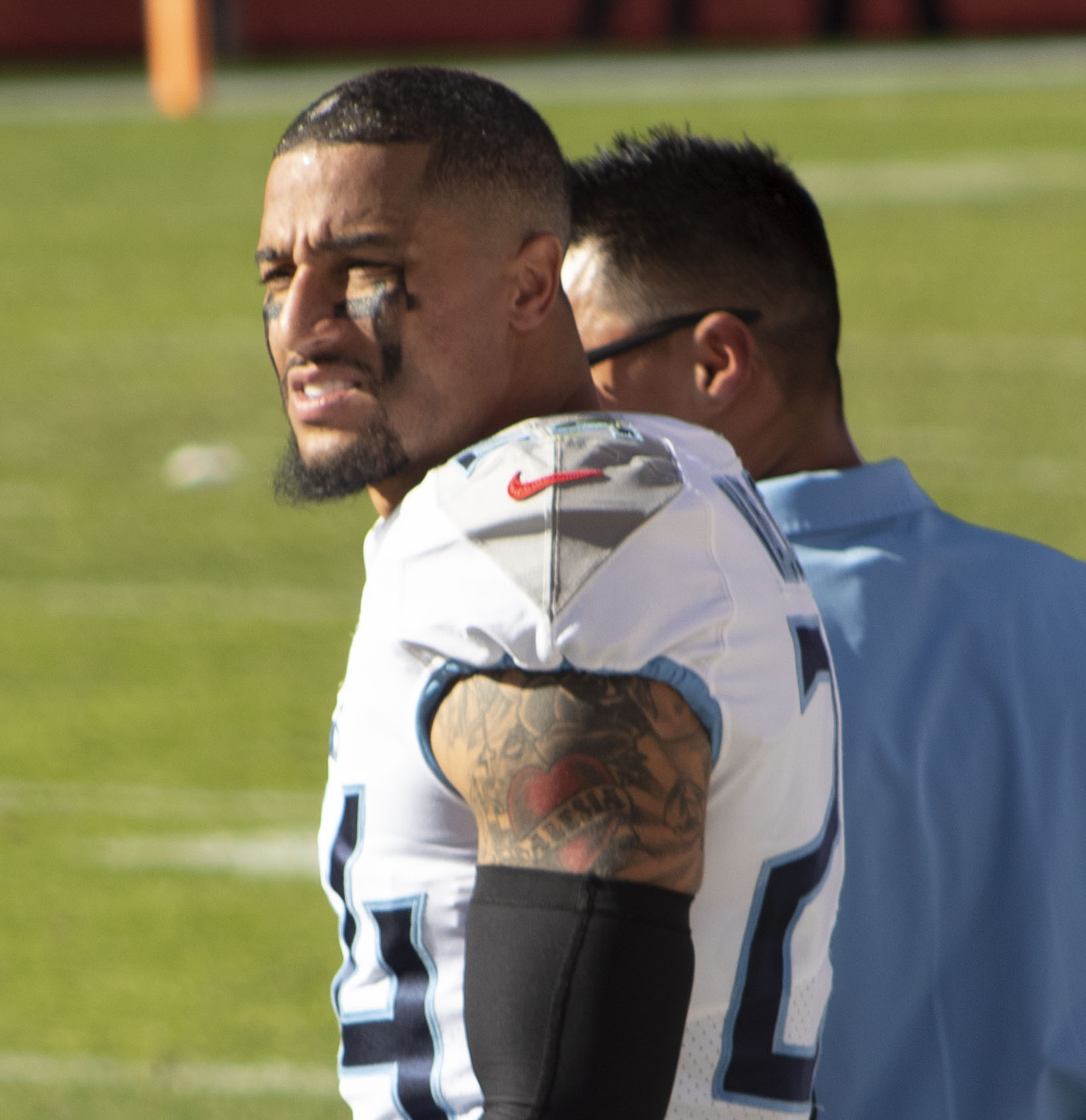
- Vaccaro with the Tennessee Titans in 2019

No. 32, 24
- Position: Safety

Personal information
- Born: February 15, 1991 (age 35); Brownwood, Texas, U.S.
- Listed height: 6 ft 0 in (1.83 m)
- Listed weight: 214 lb (97 kg)

Career information
- High school: Early (Early, Texas)
- College: Texas (2009–2012)
- NFL draft: 2013: 1st round, 15th overall pick

Career history
- New Orleans Saints (2013–2017); Tennessee Titans (2018–2020)

Awards and highlights
- PFWA All-Rookie Team (2013); First-team All-American (2012); 2× First-team All-Big 12 (2011, 2012)

Career NFL statistics
- Total tackles: 610
- Sacks: 11.5
- Forced fumbles: 4
- Fumble recoveries: 4
- Interceptions: 10
- Defensive touchdowns: 1
- Stats at Pro Football Reference

Savage

Personal information
- Name: Kenny Vaccaro

Current team
- Team: Gamers First
- Game: Halo

Career information
- Playing career: 2021–present

Team history
- 2021–: Gamers First

Kenneth Dwayne Vaccaro (born February 15, 1991) is an American former professional football player who was a safety for eight seasons in the National Football League (NFL) and founder and CEO of the Gamers First organization. They have teams in Halo and other major Esport titles. He was selected by the New Orleans Saints in the first round of the 2013 NFL draft and also played for the Tennessee Titans. He played college football for the Texas Longhorns. On December 1, 2021, he retired to pursue a career in Esports.

== Early life ==
The eldest of four children, Vaccaro was born and raised in Brownwood, Texas by a widowed mother. He attended Brownwood High School before transferring to Early High School in nearby Early, Texas for his senior year and played football at both schools, earning all-district and all-state honors. While in high school he was moved around the field and played in six different positions. He also competed in athletics in both running and field events and had career-bests of 13.26 meters in triple jump and 6.48 meters in long jump.

== College career ==
Vaccaro enrolled in the University of Texas at Austin, where he played for coach Mack Brown's Texas Longhorns football team from 2009 to 2012.

=== Freshman year ===
During his freshman year, Vaccaro appeared in all 13 games, both as a safety and on special teams. He made 1 tackle, blocked 1 punt and also forced a fumble in a game vs. Texas A&M. Texas ended the season with a 21–37 loss to Alabama. Vaccaro sacked quarterback Sam Bradford in the 2009 Red River Rivalry.

=== Sophomore year ===
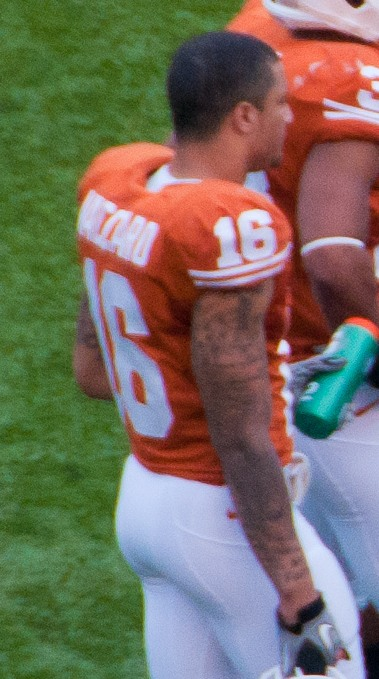
Vaccaro in 2010

In his sophomore year, Vaccaro saw more playing time in all 12 games with six starts: two games started as a safety and the other four as a nickelback. His best game of the year was against Oklahoma State where he caught his first college career interception. He had nine tackles (eight solo), one tackle for loss, and two pass breakups before the game was over. Vaccaro finished the season with 54 total tackles (42 solo), one interception, four tackles for loss, one forced fumble, and eight passes defended. The Longhorns had their first losing season (5–7) in 13 years.

=== Junior year ===
Vaccaro started all 13 games as a safety during his junior year and finished the season as a solid starter for the Texas Longhorns. He had 82 total tackles with 8 for a loss, 2.0 sacks, 8 pass breakups and 2 interceptions. In the Holiday Bowl, Vaccaro and his defense held the California Golden Bears to seven rushing yards and 195 yards of total offense. He had five tackles, two tackles-for-loss and a sack in the 21–10 victory.

=== Senior year ===
As a senior in 2012, Vaccaro was named a first-team All-American by Pro Football Weekly. He and linebacker Alex Okafor were voted as defensive captains for the season.

== Professional career ==
=== Pre-draft ===
Vaccaro attended the NFL Scouting Combine and completed all of the combine and positional drills. On March 26, 2013, Vaccaro participated at Texas' pro day, but did not perform any drills due to a hip injury. He attended private workouts and visits with a few teams, including the Dallas Cowboys, Tennessee Titans, New York Jets, Buffalo Bills, and New Orleans Saints. At the conclusion of the pre-draft process, Vaccaro was projected to be a first round pick by NFL draft experts and scouts. He was ranked as the top safety prospect in the draft by DraftScout.com, Sports Illustrated, and NFL analyst Mike Mayock.

External videos
- Kenny Vaccaro's NFL Combine Workout
- Kenny Vaccaro's 40-yard dash
- NFL Draft Profile: Kenny Vaccaro

Pre-draft measurables
Height	Weight	Arm length	Hand span	40-yard dash	10-yard split	20-yard split	20-yard shuttle	Three-cone drill	Vertical jump	Broad jump	Bench press
6 ft 0 in (1.83 m)	214 lb (97 kg)	32 3/4 in (0.83 m)	10 in (0.25 m)	4.63 s	1.60 s	2.59 s	4.06 s	6.78 s	38 in (0.97 m)	10 ft 1 in (3.07 m)	15 reps
All values from NFL Combine

=== New Orleans Saints ===
==== 2013 season ====
The New Orleans Saints selected Vaccaro in the first round (15th overall) of the 2013 NFL draft. Vaccaro was the first safety drafted in 2013 and was the highest safety drafted from the University of Texas since Earl Thomas (14th overall) in 2010.

External videos
- Saints draft Kenny Vaccaro 15th overall
- Vaccaro on being drafted by the Saints

On May 9, 2013, Vaccaro signed a fully guaranteed four-year, $9.42 million contract with a signing bonus of $5.23 million.

Throughout training camp, Vaccaro competed against Roman Harper to be the starting strong safety. Head coach Sean Payton named Vaccaro the backup strong safety behind Harper to start the regular season.

Vaccaro made his professional regular season debut and first NFL start in the Saints' season-opener against the Atlanta Falcons and made five solo tackles and deflected a pass intended for tight end Tony Gonzalez, which was caught by teammate Roman Harper on fourth down to seal a 23–17 victory. Vaccaro became the starting strong safety in Week 3 after Roman Harper sustained a knee injury. On September 22, 2013, Vaccaro recorded seven combined tackles, broke up a pass, and made his first career interception during a 31–7 win against the Arizona Cardinals in Week 3. In Week 5, he collected five solo tackles, deflected a pass, and made his first career sack on Jay Cutler in the Saints' 26–18 win against the Chicago Bears. In Week 10, Vaccaro made three solo tackles and a pass deflection before exiting in the third quarter after sustaining a concussion due to a knee colliding with his helmet while making a tackle during a 49–17 victory against the Dallas Cowboys. He remained in concussion protocol and was inactive for the Saints' Week 11 loss to the San Francisco 49ers. On December 22, 2013, Vaccaro was carted off the field during the first quarter of the Saints' 17–13 loss against the Carolina Panthers after breaking his ankle while making a tackle. On December 25, 2013, the Saints placed Vaccaro on injured reserve as he underwent ankle surgery.

Vaccaro finished his rookie season with 79 combined tackles (62 solo), eight pass deflections, a sack, a forced fumble, and an interception in 14 games and 14 starts. He was named to the PFWA All-Rookie Team.

==== 2014 season ====
Vaccaro entered training camp slated as the starting strong safety after Roman Harper departed for the Carolina Panthers during free agency. Defensive coordinator Rob Ryan named Vaccaro the starting strong safety to begin the regular season, along with free safety Jairus Byrd.

On October 19, 2014, Vaccaro made two combined tackles, a pass deflection, and an interception during a 24–23 loss against the Detroit Lions. The following week, he collected a season-high ten combined tackles (eight solo) during a 44–23 victory against the Green Bay Packers. Vaccaro was inactive for the Saints' Week 17 victory at the Tampa Bay Buccaneers due to a quadriceps injury. Vacarro finished his second season with 71 combined tackles (54 solo), five pass deflections, two interceptions, and a sack in 15 games and 14 starts. He received an overall grade of 42.8 from Pro Football Focus, which ranked as the 83rd highest grade among all qualifying safeties in 2014.

==== 2015 season ====
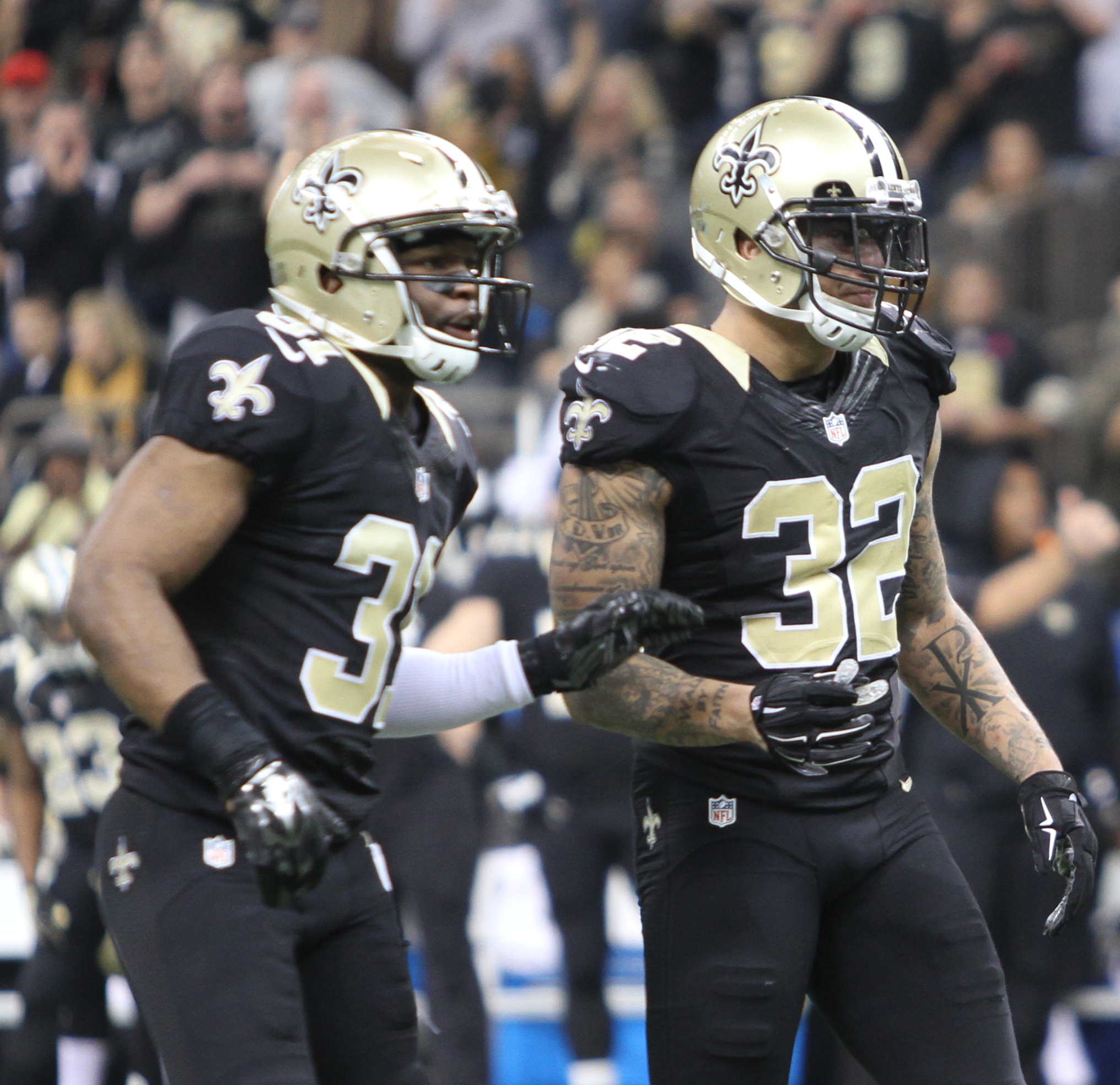
Vaccaro (right) in 2015

Head coach Sean Payton retained Vaccaro and Jairus Byrd as the starting safeties in 2015. On November 16, 2015, the Saints decided to fire defensive coordinator Rob Ryan after a 48–14 loss against the Washington Redskins in Week 10. In Week 11, Vacarro collected a season-high 13 combined tackles (eight solo) and forced a fumble during a 24–6 loss against the Houston Texans. On December 27, 2015, Vaccaro recorded three solo tackles and made two sacks on Jaguars' quarterback Blake Bortles in the Saints' 38–27 win against the Jacksonville Jaguars in Week 16. Vaccaro started in all 16 games in 2015 and recorded a career-high 104 combined tackles (71 solo), five pass deflections, three sacks, and a forced fumble. Pro Football Focus gave Vaccaro an overall grade of 80.0, which ranked 21st among all qualifying safeties in 2015.

==== 2016 season ====
On April 12, 2016, the Saints exercised the fifth-year option on Vaccaro's rookie contract and agreed to pay him $5.76 million for the 2017 season. Defensive coordinator Dennis Allen retained Vaccaro and Jairus Byrd as the starting safeties.

Vaccaro was inactive for the Saints' Week 3 loss to the Atlanta Falcons due to an ankle injury. On November 6, 2016, Vaccaro collected a season-high nine solo tackles during a 41–23 win at the San Francisco 49ers in Week 9. On November 10, 2016, it was reported that Vaccaro was facing a four-game suspension for violating the league's policy on performance-enhancing drugs for using Adderall and planned to appeal. In Week 10, Vaccaro made nine combined tackles, two pass deflections, an interception, and a sack during a 25–23 loss to the Denver Broncos. On December 9, 2016, Vaccaro dropped his plan to appeal and accepted the four-game suspension. He served his suspension and was inactive for the last four games of the 2016 season. He finished the season with 68 combined tackles (51 solo), five pass deflections, two forced fumbles, an interception, and a sack in 11 games and 11 starts. Pro Football Focus gave Vaccaro an overall grade of 79.9. His grade was the 38th highest among all qualifying safeties in 2016.

==== 2017 season ====
Vaccaro entered training camp facing competition from Vonn Bell and rookie second-rounder Marcus Williams. Head coach Sean Payton named Vaccaro the starting strong safety to begin the regular season, alongside free safety Vonn Bell.

On October 15, 2017, Vaccaro recorded four combined tackles, a season-high three pass deflections, an interception, and scored a touchdown during a 52–38 victory against the Detroit Lions. During the first quarter, Vaccaro recovered a fumble in the end zone after Alex Okafor stripped it from quarterback Matthew Stafford. He missed two games (Weeks 10–11) after injuring his groin. In Week 15, he collected a season-high ten combined tackles (eight solo) during the Saints' 31–19 victory against the New York Jets. On December 21, 2017, the Saints officially placed Vaccaro on injured reserve due to a wrist and groin injury. Vaccaro had been playing with an injured adductor muscle that had torn off the bone and also required surgery to repair his wrist. Vaccaro finished the season with 60 combined tackles (48 solo), seven pass deflections, 3.5 sacks, a fumble recovery, and a touchdown in 14 games and 14 starts. Pro Football Focus gave Vaccaro an overall grade of 50.3, which ranked 114th among all the qualifying cornerbacks in 2017.

=== Tennessee Titans ===
On August 4, 2018, Vaccaro signed a one-year, $1.5 million contract with the Tennessee Titans after starting strong safety Johnathan Cyprien suffered a season-ending torn ACL.

==== 2018 season ====
During the season-opener against the Miami Dolphins, Vaccaro recorded his first interception as a Titan by picking off Ryan Tannehill in the 27–20 loss. Two weeks later, he recorded his first sack of the season by sacking quarterback Blake Bortles in a 9–6 victory over the Jacksonville Jaguars. However, in the next game against the Philadelphia Eagles, Vaccaro suffered an elbow injury during the second quarter. He did not return and the Titans won by a score of 26–23 in overtime. On October 1, it was reported that Vaccaro had a dislocated elbow, which required him to miss two to four weeks.

Vaccaro finished the 2018 season with 58 tackles, two sacks, four pass deflections, and one interception.

==== 2019 season ====
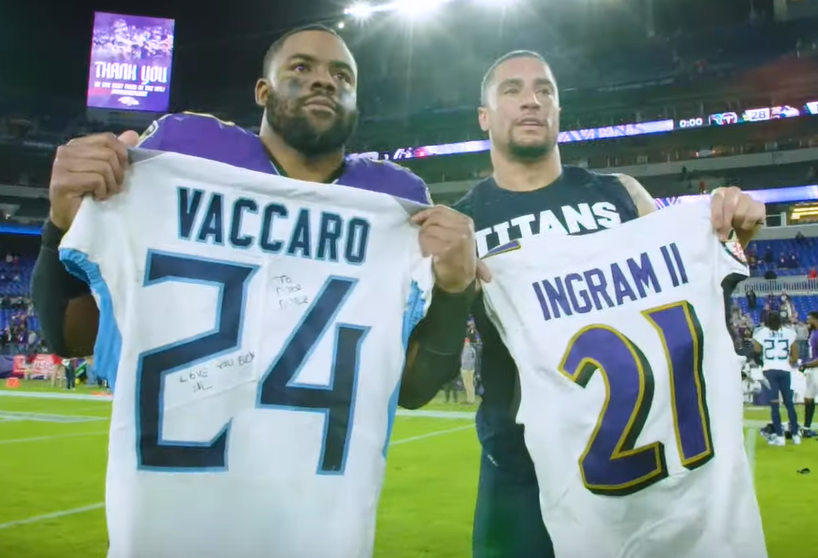
Vaccaro alongside Mark Ingram II in the AFC Divisional Round of the playoffs

On March 11, 2019, Vaccaro signed a four-year, $26 million contract extension with the Titans with $11.5 million guaranteed.

During Week 11 against the Jacksonville Jaguars, Vaccaro recorded his first sack of the season by sacking Nick Foles in the fourth quarter. During Week 15 against the Houston Texans, Vaccaro recorded his first interception of the season off a pass thrown by Deshaun Watson in the 24–21 loss.

In the Divisional Round of the playoffs against the Baltimore Ravens, Vaccaro intercepted a pass thrown by Lamar Jackson during the 28–12 road victory.

==== 2020 season ====
In Week 2 against the Jacksonville Jaguars, Vaccaro led the team with 11 tackles and made his first sack of the season on Gardner Minshew during the 33–30 win.

On March 10, 2021, Vaccaro was released by the Titans.

=== Retirement ===
On December 1, 2021, Vaccaro announced his retirement from the NFL along with the official launch of his esports organization, “Gamers First” (G1).

== NFL career statistics ==
=== Regular season ===
Year	Team	Games		Tackles				Interceptions						Fumbles			
Year	Team	GP	GS	Cmb	Solo	Ast	Sck	PD	Int	Yds	Avg	Lng	TD	FF	FR	Yds	TD
2013	NO	14	14	79	62	17	1.0	8	1	29	29.0	29	0	1	0	0	0
2014	NO	15	14	74	51	23	1.0	5	2	45	22.5	45	0	0	0	0	0
2015	NO	16	16	104	71	33	3.0	5	0	2	2.0	2	0	1	1	8	0
2016	NO	11	11	68	51	17	1.0	5	2	30	15.0	30	0	2	1	0	0
2017	NO	12	12	60	48	12	1.5	7	3	41	13.7	30	0	0	1	0	1
2018	TEN	13	13	58	41	17	2.0	4	1	0	0.0	0	0	0	0	0	0
2019	TEN	16	16	84	51	33	1.0	5	1	2	2.0	2	0	0	0	0	0
2020	TEN	13	13	83	62	21	1.0	5	0	0	0.0	0	0	0	1	53	0
Career		110	109	610	437	173	11.5	44	10	147	14.7	45	0	4	4	61	1

=== Postseason ===
Year	Team	Games		Tackles				Interceptions						Fumbles			
Year	Team	GP	GS	Cmb	Solo	Ast	Sck	PD	Int	Yds	Avg	Lng	TD	FF	FR	Yds	TD
2019	TEN	2	2	9	8	1	0.0	2	1	3	3.0	3	0	0	0	0	0
Career		2	2	9	8	1	0.0	2	1	3	3.0	3	0	0	0	0	0

== Personal life ==
Vaccaro's younger brother, Kevin, played for the Texas Longhorns football team from 2012 to 2016. Their uncle is retired cornerback and Super Bowl XXVI winner A. J. Johnson. Vaccaro traveled to Kenya during the 2016 offseason with former Texas and Saints teammate Alex Okafor and is involved in community and fundraising efforts to construct a school in the region. Vaccaro also founded the Kenny Vaccaro Foundation to provide economically-challenged students with literacy and education resources so that they can achieve academic excellence, develop confident personal skills, and make positive decisions to avoid high-risk behavior.

Vaccaro is the brother-in-law to wide receiver, Tyreek Hill, who married Vaccaro's sister Keeta.

On April 19, 2024 YouTuber and Twitch streamer GernaderJake announced on X that he is suing G1 over an unpaid $100,000 loan that he claims "Kenny is personally liable for." On February 14, 2025 GernaderJake announced on X that the lawsuit had concluded in his favor and Vaccaro was ordered to pay out "roughly $245,000 plus interest."

== See also ==
- List of Texas Longhorns football All-Americans
