= National Register of Historic Places listings in Brown County, Texas =

Location of Brown County in Texas

This is a list of the National Register of Historic Places listings in Brown County, Texas.

This is intended to be a complete list of properties listed on the National Register of Historic Places in Brown County, Texas. There are six properties listed on the National Register in the county. Two properties are listed as Recorded Texas Historic Landmarks (RTHLs) while another property includes two RTHLs.

This National Park Service list is complete through NPS recent listings posted March 21, 2025.

== Current listings ==
The locations of National Register properties may be seen in a mapping service provided.

	Name on the Register	Image	Date listed	Location	City or town	Description
1	Brown County Jail	Brown County Jail	September 22, 1983 (#83003129)	401 W. Broadway; 31°43′25″N 98°58′52″W	Brownwood	
2	Greenleaf Fisk House	Greenleaf Fisk House	February 25, 2004 (#04000103)	418 Milton Ave. 31°43′15″N 98°58′39″W	Brownwood	
3	R. F. Hardin High School	R. F. Hardin High School	June 25, 1999 (#99000722)	1009 Hall St. 31°43′30″N 98°59′26″W	Brownwood	
4	Santa Fe Railroad Station	Santa Fe Railroad Station	January 2, 1976 (#76002012)	Washington Ave. between E. Depot and E. Adams Sts. 31°42′57″N 98°58′47″W	Brownwood	Includes Recorded Texas Historic Landmarks
5	St. John's Church	St. John's Church	September 4, 1979 (#79002923)	700 Main Ave; 31°43′10″N 98°59′08″W	Brownwood	Recorded Texas Historic Landmark
6	J. A. Walker House and R. B. Rogers House	J. A. Walker House and R. B. Rogers House	July 19, 1982 (#82004494)	701 and 707 Center Ave. 31°43′06″N 98°59′05″W	Brownwood	Recorded Texas Historic Landmarks
7	Weakley-Watson Building	Weakley-Watson Building	February 28, 2020 (#100005003)	100-102 Fisk Ave. 31°43′14″N 98°58′47″W	Brownwood	

== See also ==
- National Register of Historic Places listings in Texas
- Recorded Texas Historic Landmarks in Brown County
