= Brownwood Independent School District =

School district in Texas

The Brownwood Independent School District is a public school district in Brownwood, Texas (USA). It was established in 1883.

It includes almost all of the Brownwood city limits, except for sections around Brownwood Regional Airport, along with unincorporated areas.

It is best known as the longtime home of high school football coach Gordon Wood, who during his career won nine state championships, seven of them at Brownwood.

In 2009, the school district was rated "recognized" by the Texas Education Agency.

== Schools ==
Secondary

- Brownwood High School (9-12)
- Brownwood Accelerated High School (alternative, 11-12)
- Brownwood Middle School (7-8)

Elementary

- Coggin Elementary School
  - Formerly Coggin Fourth Grade School
- East Elementary
- Northwest Elementary
- Woodland Heights Elementary
  - 2005 National Blue Ribbon School

Former schools

- R. F. Hardin High School (school for black children)
- Brownwood Intermediate School
