= R. F. Hardin High School =

Former segregated school in Brownwood, Texas

- U.S. National Register of Historic Places
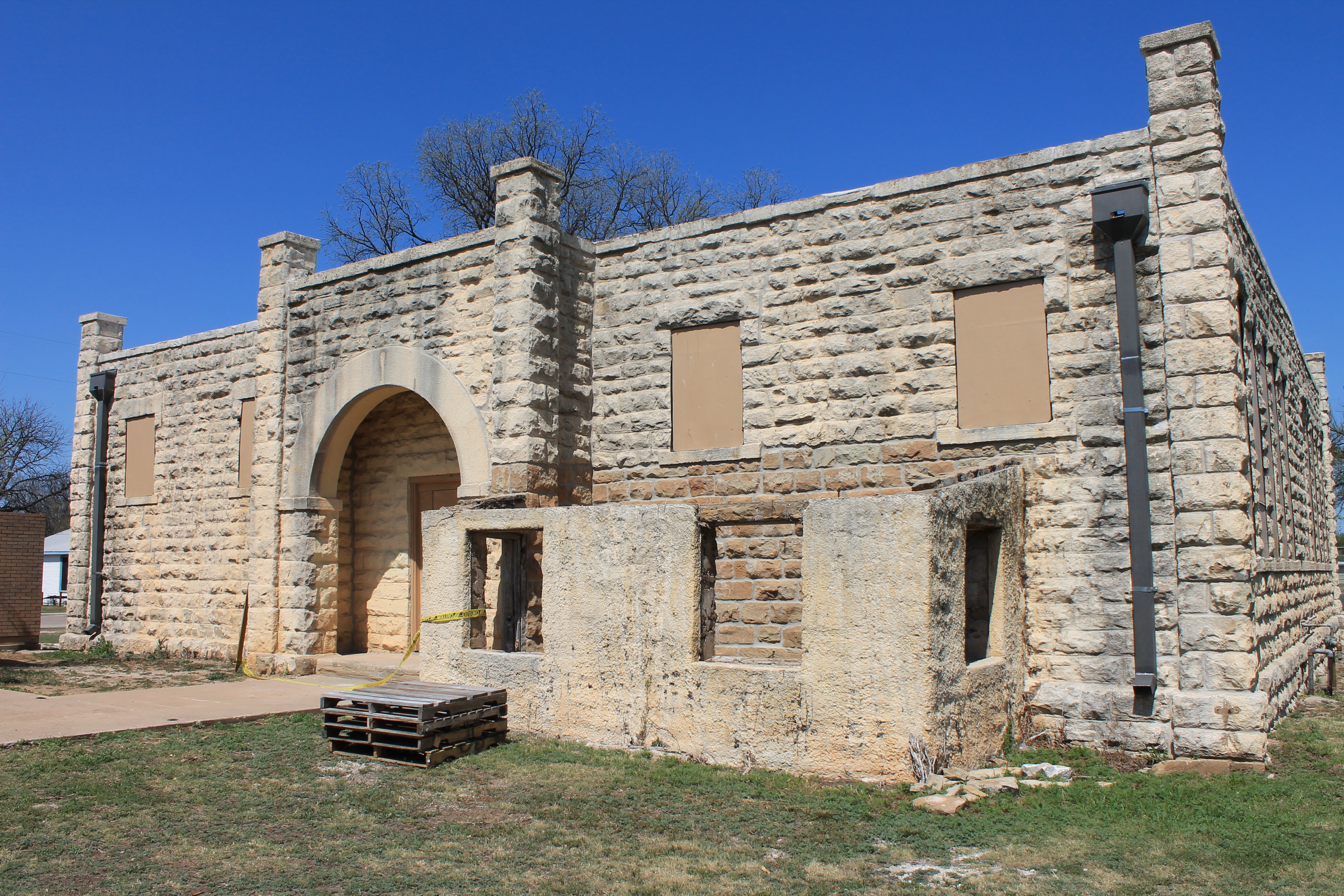
- The building in 2013

- Location within Texas Location within the United States
- Location: 1009 Hall Street; Brownwood, Texas
- Coordinates: 31°43′30″N 98°59′26″W
- Built: 1917
- NRHP reference No.: 99000722
- Added to NRHP: June 25, 1999

R. F. Hardin High School, previously Brownwood Colored High School, was a K-12 school for black children in Brownwood, Texas, operated by the Brownwood Independent School District.

== History ==
In 1885, George E. Smith, a former slave and Buffalo Soldier established a school for black children that would later become R. F. Hardin High. Initially Smith served as principal and teacher, and the school met in Black churches. In 1896, the school recruited Rufus F. Hardin to come teach. Hardin had been born a slave in 1859, and graduated from Prairie View Normal Institute as well as Paul Quinn College in Waco, Tillotson College in Austin, and Fisk University in Tennessee. Hardin taught in Lee Chapel Church at the corner of Cordell and Hendrick, and in a two-story building at Beaver and Cordell from 1896 until a stroke forced him to retire in 1934. The school was known as the Cordell School, and had only Hardin and one other teacher.

In 1910 the school district voted to purchase property for a public school for "colored people". In 1916, Coggin School, a school for White children burned. In May 1917, the BISD used the stone from the Coggin School to build a four-room school on the property.

The school opened in 1917, and served ten grades. The school had two stories and was built of stone.

It was, for a period, the only school in that city to have black students, during a period of de jure educational segregation in the United States. The school was renamed after Rufus F. Hardin, a former principal, in 1934. In 1947, the school became a "fully affiliated and accredited high school". In 1955, the district moved high school students to Brownwood High School, making it a school for all races, in response to Brown v. Board of Education. From 1955 to 1966, Hardin served for a time as an elementary school. Because the elementary school was not integrated and therefore violated the Civil Rights Act of 1965 the district closed the school in 1966. From 1966 to 1970 the building housed a Head Start.

Friends of Rufus F. Hardin Museum, Inc. lobbied for historic status. The building was put on the National Register for Historic Places in 1999.

In 2023 there were plans to establish a museum in the Hardin building.

== See also ==
- National Register of Historic Places listings in Brown County, Texas
