= Red Rountree =

Red Rountree may refer to:

- J. L. Hunter "Red" Rountree
- Walter B. "Red" Rountree
