= St. John's Church (Brownwood, Texas) =

Historic church in Texas, United States

- U.S. National Register of Historic Places
- Recorded Texas Historic Landmark
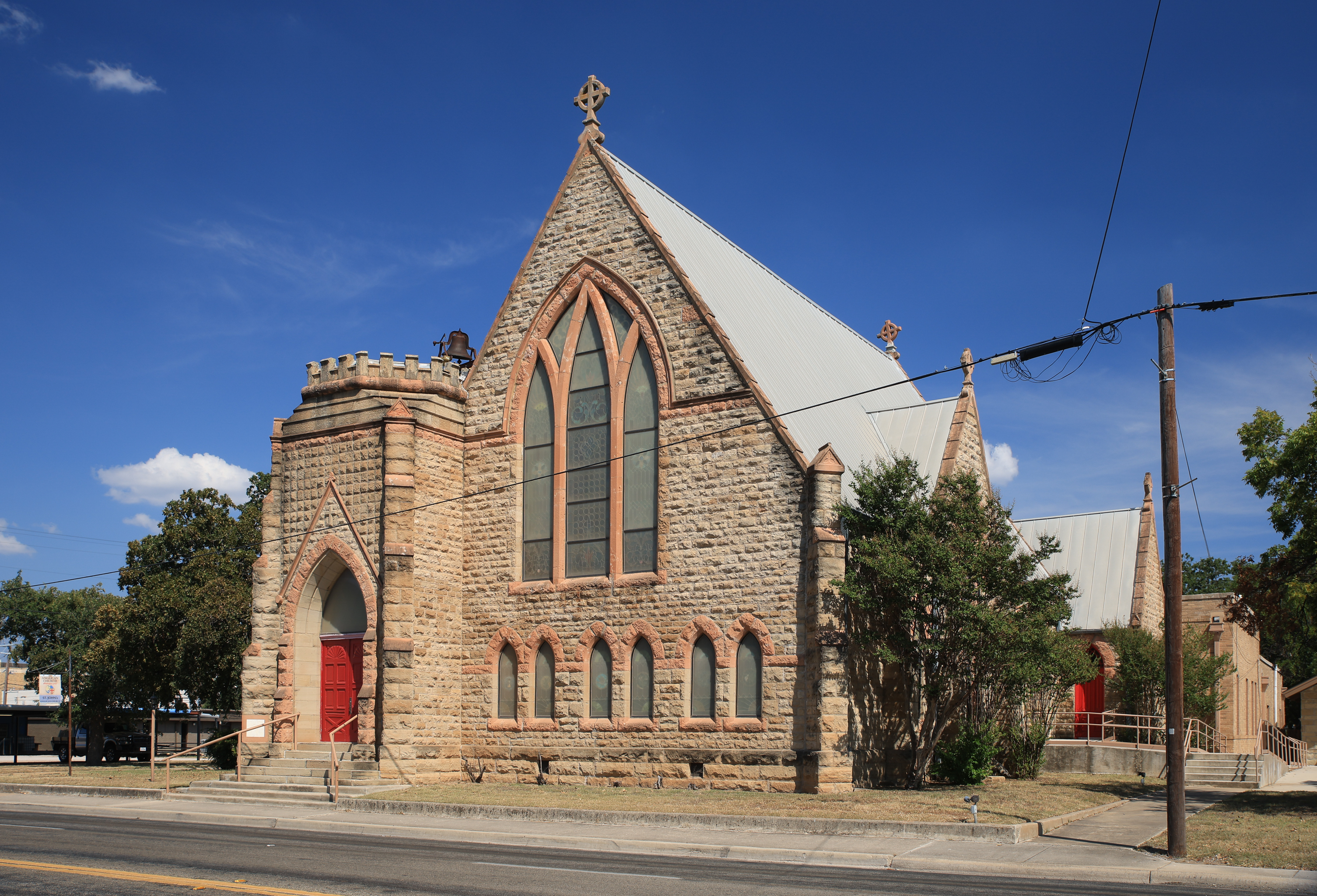
- St. John's Episcopal Church in 2009

- Location within Texas Location within the United States
- Location: 700 Main Ave, Brownwood, Texas
- Coordinates: 31°43′16″N 98°59′8″W
- Area: less than one acre
- Built: 1892
- Architect: Lovell & Hood
- Architectural style: Late Gothic Revival, Late Victorian
- NRHP reference No.: 79002923
- RTHL No.: 5042

Significant dates
- Added to NRHP: September 4, 1979
- Designated RTHL: 1962

St. John's Church is a historic church at 700 Main Street in Brownwood, Texas. It is a congregation of the Episcopal Diocese of Fort Worth.

The cornerstone was laid in 1892, and the building contractors were Tom Lovell and William Hood. The church was constructed from locally quarried sandstone, and its interior was completed in stages as funds became available. It was added to the National Register of Historic Places in 1979 under the name St. John's Episcopal Church.

== See also ==
- National Register of Historic Places listings in Brown County, Texas
- Recorded Texas Historic Landmarks in Brown County
