= Brownwood High School =

Location
- 2100 Slayden Street; Brownwood, Texas 76801; United States; 31.6913°N 98.9787°W

Information
- School type: Public high school
- School district: Brownwood Independent School District
- Principal: Lindsay Smith
- Teaching staff: 70.89 (FTE)
- Grades: 9-12
- Enrollment: 943 (2023-2024)
- Student to teacher ratio: 13.30
- Colors: Maroon and white
- Athletics conference: UIL Class 4A
- Nickname: Lion/Lady Lion
- Website: www.brownwoodisd.org/bhs

Brownwood High School is a public high school located in Brownwood, Texas, United States. It is part of the Brownwood Independent School District located in central Brown County, and is classified as a 4A school by the UIL. For the 2024-2025 school year, the school was given a "C" by the Texas Education Agency.

== History ==
In 1955 the school racially integrated, taking black students formerly at R. F. Hardin High School.

== Athletics ==
The Brownwood Lions compete in the following sports:

- Baseball
- Basketball
- Cross country
- Football
- Golf
- Powerlifting
- Soccer
- Softball
- Tennis
- Track and field
- Volleyball

During the 1960s and 1970s, Brownwood had one of the most dominant football programs in Texas. Under the guidance of coach Gordon Wood, the Lions made the state finals eight times, winning titles on a state-record seven occasions.

=== State titles ===
- Football
  - 1960 (3A), 1965 (3A), 1967 (3A), 1969 (3A), 1970 (3A), 1978 (3A), 1981 (4A)
- Boys' golf
  - 1955 (2A), 1985 (4A), 1986 (4A) 2017 (4A)
- Boys' track
  - 1962 (3A)
- Girls Track
  - 2025 (4A)
- UIL Academics - Accounting
  - 2003 Individual and Team (4A), 2004 Individual (4A), 2005 Individual and Team (4A), 2006 Individual and Team (4A), 2007 Team (4A), 2008 Individual and Team (4A)

==== State finalists ====
- Boys' basketball
  - 1949 (2A)
- Football
  - 1977 (3A)
- Volleyball
  - 2008 (3A)

=== Classification ===
Brownwood competes in class 4A in a district with Big Spring, Andrews, Lubbock Estacado, and San Angelo Lakeview.

== Theatre ==
The Theatre Department at Brownwood High School is headed by Shannon "Momma" Lee. She began her career as the Theatre Director at Brownwood during the 2014-2015 school year. She was a student at Brownwood High School when Larry Mathis was the director. He retired at the end of the 2013-2014 school year. The 2014 fall production was Beauty and the Beast.

The Theatre Department won 1st division titles at both the District and Area contests in 2014 for their production of The Mill on the Floss, produced by Larry Mathis for the third time. They also won many awards, including Best Actor, several All Star Cast, Honorable Mention All Star Cast, and the Tech Award. They went on to compete at Regionals.

=== State titles ===
- One Act Play
  - 1967 (3A)

== Notable alumni ==
- Bob Denver, lead actor in Gilligan's Island
- Larry Elkins, two-time All-American flanker at Baylor, and later for the AFL's Houston Oilers
- Jimmy Harris, former NFL defensive back
- Shawn Hollingsworth, football player
- Robert E. Howard, fantasy and sci-fi writer, creator of Conan the Barbarian
- Bart Johnson, wide receiver for TCU Horned Frogs football team and Cincinnati Bengals
- Matt McCrane, kicker for Kansas State and several NFL teams
- Shelby Miller, Major League Baseball Pitcher
- Jim Morris, former MLB pitcher for Tampa Bay Rays
- Casey Pachall, quarterback for the TCU Horned Frogs football team, Toronto Argonauts
- Dave Ribble, former NFL guard
- Roy Spence, founder of GSD&M Idea City
- Larry D. Thomas, 2008 Texas Poet Laureate
- Jim Thomason, former Detroit Lions halfback
- Kenny Vaccaro, former safety for Texas Longhorns and New Orleans Saints and the Tennessee Titans
- Roy White, former NFL fullback
- Bob Young, former NFL lineman
