= Josh Rosenthal =

American singer-songwriter (born 1983)

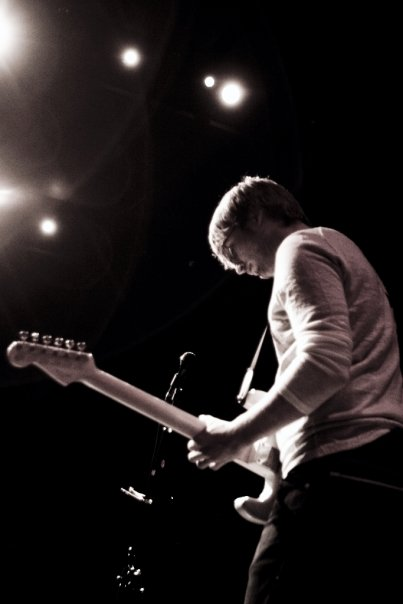
- Rosenthal live at the Rose Wagner Theater in Salt Lake City (by Michael Friberg)

Background information
- Born: January 13, 1983 (age 42)
- Origin: Brownwood, Texas, United States
- Genres: Folk, Americana
- Occupation: Singer-songwriter
- Years active: 2008–present
- Labels: Black Manor
- Website: www.joshrosenthal.net

Josh Rosenthal (born January 13, 1983, Brownwood, Texas) is an American singer-songwriter based in Salt Lake City, Utah. He sings about reconciliation after his parents' divorce, general relationship hardships and his affection for Salt Lake City. His song "Gotta Get Out" is about Lubbock, Texas. He has played at protestant churches, Young Life camps and banquets as well as theaters and auditoriums across the United States. He got a college degree from the University of Utah in Humanities – Strategic Communication in 2009.

== Biography ==
=== Early years ===
Born in Brownwood, Texas, Rosenthal is the youngest of three brothers. Six years after he was born, Rosenthal moved to Benbrook, Texas, where he attended Benbrook Elementary from kindergarten through fifth grade. After that he attended Monnig Middle School for a year. It was at that time his father, David Rosenthal, got a job in Lubbock, Texas, to work at a maximum facility prison as an associate clinical psychologist.

Rosenthal's first band – the Eddie Munsters – came about through AOL. Zak White and Michael Scott posted a need for a guitar player in a music chat room. Rosenthal, eager to start playing, contacted them and set up a time to meet. From there the Eddie Munsters broke up and Mikey Likes It was formed. The summer after his ninth grade year, Rosenthal became a Christian. Out of that experience he began playing in a band named Crash Test Pete with Zak White and Jordan Polk.

Rosenthal moved to Salt Lake City to work with Lee Mashburn at Hidden Valley Presbyterian.

== Prominence in Salt Lake City ==
Rosenthal's albums: Cordillera, Renaissance, and Narratives, have sold thousands of copies in Utah. He has headlined such venues as Sandy Amphitheater and the Rose Wagner Theater. Utah's Deseret News reviewed Rosenthal's Christmas album:

Utah-based singer-songwriter Josh Rosenthal's five-song holiday CD is not your typical Christmas release. This is evident once the dynamic acoustic-laden, roadtrip jam of "O Come, O Come Emmanuel" begins. Rosenthal's production can be heard throughout on original works "This Changes Everything" and "Before I Go", and Steve Weisberg's "Christmas for Cowboys" and Lyle Lovett's "Christmas Morning." "Narratives" is a fresh collection of holiday music available on iTunes.

== Albums ==
=== Punk rock ===
Rosenthal was in a band in high school called Crash Test Pete. They toured nationally to promote their only release. Members included: Jordan Polk and Zak White.

- CTP – The Hand You're Dealt (2000)

=== Solo ===
- Inspired by Tuesday (2004)
- Independent Hour Compilation (2005)
- Cordillera (2006)
- The Anatomy of Healing (2007)
- Renaissance (2008)
- Narratives (2008)
- Overture (2009)
- Even the Strongest Hero (2009)
- Lonely Together (2009)
- For a Day (2009)

== National tours ==
- Invisible Children Tour (2007) with Josh Wilson (Sparrow Records)
- Three Legged Tour (2007) with Josh Wilson (Sparrow Records)
- Need to Know Tour (2008) with Josh Wilson (Sparrow Records)
