= Shawn Hollingsworth =

American football player (born 1961)

No. 73
- Position: Offensive tackle

Personal information
- Born: December 4, 1961 (age 64); Brownwood, Texas, U.S.
- Listed height: 6 ft 2 in (1.88 m)
- Listed weight: 260 lb (118 kg)

Career information
- High school: Brownwood
- College: New Mexico (1979); Angelo State (1980–1982)
- NFL draft: 1983: undrafted

Career history
- Denver Broncos (1983)

Career NFL statistics
- Games played: 5
- Stats at Pro Football Reference

Shawn Lenor Hollingsworth (born December 4, 1961) is an American former professional football player who was an offensive tackle for one season with the Denver Broncos of the National Football League (NFL). He played college football for the New Mexico Lobos and Angelo State Rams

== Early life and college ==
Shawn Lenor Hollingsworth was born on December 4, 1961, in Brownwood, Texas. He attended Brownwood High School in Brownwood.

Hollingsworth was a letterman for the Lobos of the University of New Mexico in 1979. He was then a three-year starter at offensive tackle and a three-year letterman for the Rams of Angelo State University from 1980 to 1982.

== Professional career ==
After going undrafted in the 1983 NFL draft, Hollingsworth signed with the Denver Broncos on April 28. He played in five games for the Broncos as an offensive tackle before being placed on injured reserve on October 21, 1983, with a knee injury. He wore jersey number 73 while with the Broncos and was listed at 6'2", 260 pounds. Hollingsworth was released on August 27, 1984.
