= Early High School =

American public high school

Location
- 115 Sudderth Drive; Early, Texas 76803-3315; United States; 31.7459°N 98.9321°W

Information
- School type: Public high school
- School district: Early Independent School District
- Principal: Benjamin Chaplin
- Staff: 32.47 (FTE)
- Grades: 9-12
- Enrollment: 365 (2023-2024)
- Student to teacher ratio: 11.24
- Colors: Purple & Gold
- Athletics conference: UIL Class 3A
- Mascot: Longhorn
- Website: Early High School website

Early High School is a 3A public high school located in Early, Texas, United States. It is part of the Early Independent School District located in central Brown County. For the 2024-2025 school year, the school was given a "B" by the Texas Education Agency.

== Athletics ==
The Early Longhorns compete in the following sports:

- Baseball
- Basketball
- Cross Country
- Football
- Golf
- Powerlifting
- Softball
- Tennis
- Track and Field
- Volleyball
