= Shelby Miller =

American baseball player (born 1990)

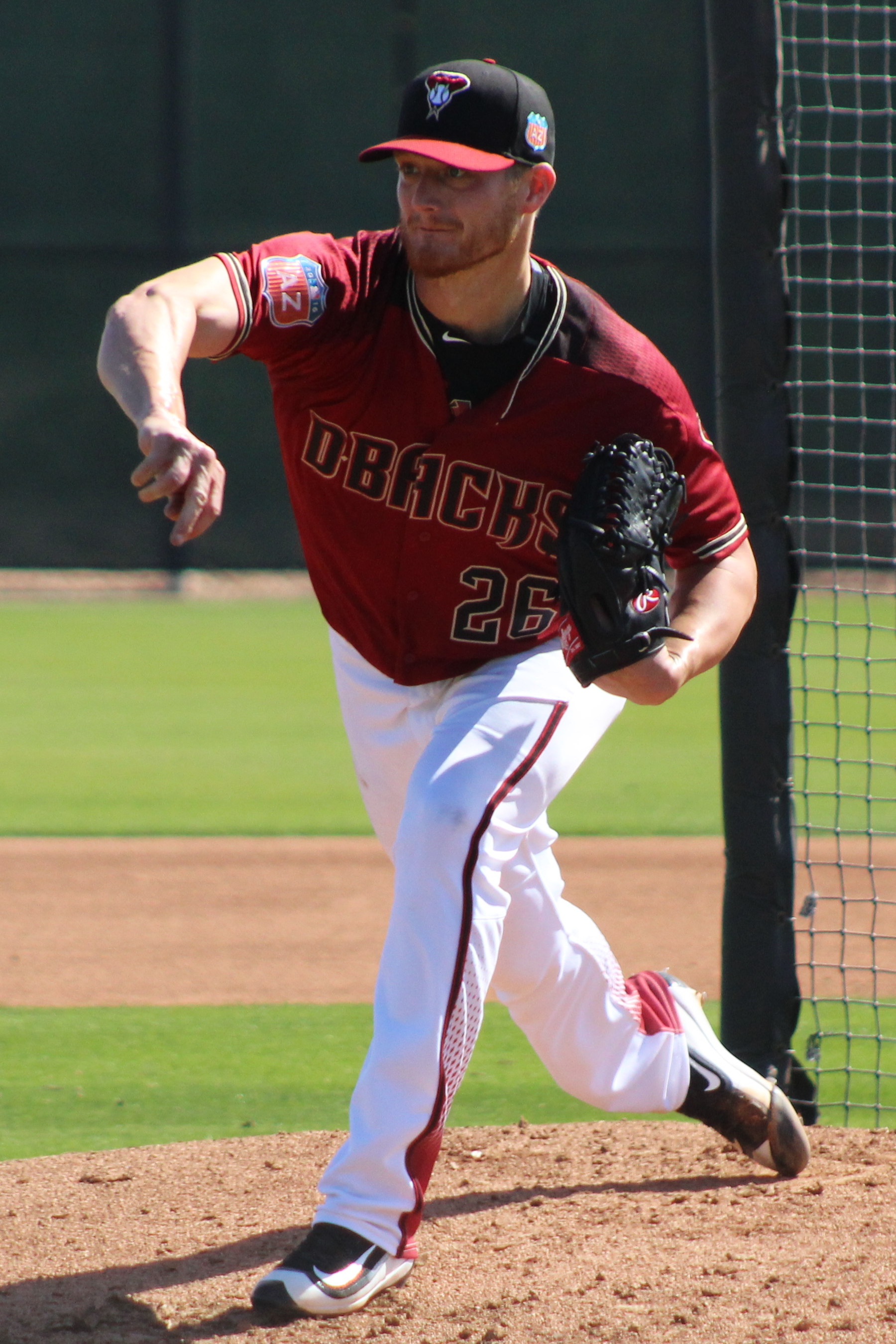
- Miller with the Arizona Diamondbacks

Chicago Cubs – No. 77
- Pitcher
- Born: October 10, 1990 (age 36); Round Rock, Texas, U.S.
- Bats: Right Throws: Right

MLB debut
- September 5, 2012, for the St. Louis Cardinals

MLB statistics (through 2025 season)
- Win–loss record: 51–69
- Earned run average: 4.04
- Strikeouts: 789
- Stats at Baseball Reference

Teams
- St. Louis Cardinals (2012–2014); Atlanta Braves (2015); Arizona Diamondbacks (2016–2018); Texas Rangers (2019); Chicago Cubs (2021); Pittsburgh Pirates (2021); San Francisco Giants (2022); Los Angeles Dodgers (2023); Detroit Tigers (2024); Arizona Diamondbacks (2025); Milwaukee Brewers (2025)

Career highlights and awards
- All-Star (2015)

Shelby Charles Miller (born October 10, 1990) is an American professional baseball pitcher for the Chicago Cubs of Major League Baseball (MLB). He has previously played in MLB for the St. Louis Cardinals, Atlanta Braves, Arizona Diamondbacks, Texas Rangers, Pittsburgh Pirates, San Francisco Giants, Los Angeles Dodgers, Detroit Tigers, and Milwaukee Brewers.

Drafted by the Cardinals out of Brownwood High School in the first round of the 2009 MLB draft, Miller was one of the sport's highest-rated prospects. He is a recipient of numerous awards, including the Cardinals' minor league pitcher of the year in 2010, Baseball America's number one Cardinals prospect from 2009 to 2011, and selection to the All-Star Futures Game in 2010 and 2011. A fourth award, MLB.com's Pitching Performance of the Month, was the result of his first MLB complete game shutout in May 2013, a one-hitter against the Colorado Rockies.

After the 2014 season, the Cardinals traded Miller to the Braves. In 2015, Miller was named to the MLB All-Star Game. That offseason, the Braves traded Miller to the Diamondbacks.

== Early life ==
Miller was born in Round Rock, Texas, and attended Brownwood High School in Brownwood, Texas. He played for the school's baseball team as a pitcher. In his sophomore year, he threw a no-hitter and helped lead his team to the regional semifinals. As a junior in 2008, Miller threw three no-hitters in consecutive games, including one perfect game.

In Miller's senior year, he pitched to a 10–2 win–loss record with a 1.90 earned run average (ERA), and recorded 153 strikeouts in 77 2/3 innings pitched, with his fastball recorded as fast as 97 miles per hour (156 km/h). He drew comparisons to fellow Texas power pitchers Nolan Ryan and Josh Beckett. In addition to baseball, he played tight end and defensive end for the school's football team. He played quarterback until the seventh grade, when he suffered a staph infection, allowing Casey Pachall to win the role. Miller committed to attend Texas A&M University on a scholarship to play college baseball for the Texas A&M Aggies baseball team.

== Professional career ==
=== Draft and minor leagues ===
The St. Louis Cardinals selected Miller in the first round of the 2009 Major League Baseball draft. Rather than attend Texas A&M, Miller signed with the Cardinals, receiving a $2.875 million signing bonus on the August 17 deadline. The Cardinals assigned him to the Quad Cities River Bandits of the Single–A Midwest League, where he made two appearances. He returned to Quad Cities for the 2010 season, where he compiled a 7–5 win–loss record, a 3.62 ERA, 140 strikeouts and 33 walks in 104 1/3 innings pitched. During the season, he appeared in the All-Star Futures Game. He was named the Cardinals' minor league pitcher of the year after the season.

Miller began the 2011 season with the Palm Beach Cardinals of the High–A Florida State League (FSL). He was named the Cardinal Nation pitcher of the month for May 2011 after posting a 2.32 ERA for the month, and was promoted to the Springfield Cardinals of the Double–A Texas League at the beginning of June. At the time of his promotion, he led the FSL with 81 strikeouts, and was considered the best pitching prospect in baseball by Keith Law of ESPN.com. Along with Carlos Martínez, Miller represented the Cardinals at the 2011 All-Star Futures Game. He made Baseball America's top prospect list in the 2011 midseason. The Cardinals named Miller their minor league pitcher of the month for June 2011. He pitched to a 9–3 win–loss record with a 2.70 ERA with 89 strikeouts in 86 2/3 innings pitched with Springfield. Miller totaled 25 starts with Palm Beach and Springfield, completing 139 1/2 innings and allowing a 2.70 ERA, 112 hits, 53 walks, and striking out 170 batters for an average of 11.0 strikeouts per nine innings pitched (K/9). After the season, Baseball America rated his fastball as the best in the Cardinals system, and named him a starting pitcher on their 2011 Minor League All-Star team. He was again named the Cardinals' Minor League Pitcher of the Year.

Miller entered the 2012 season ranked as the fifth best prospect in baseball by MLB.com. After competing for a spot on the Cardinals roster, he began the 2012 season with the Memphis Redbirds of the Triple–A Pacific Coast League (PCL). Though he struggled in the beginning of the 2012 season, pitching to an ERA above 6.00 through the beginning of July, Miller pitched to an ERA below 3.00 for the remainder of the minor league season, and recorded 160 strikeouts for the Redbirds in 137 innings pitched.

=== St. Louis Cardinals ===
==== 2012 season ====
Miller made his MLB debut on September 5, 2012, against the New York Mets, as a relief pitcher. He threw two shutout innings, giving up one hit, walking none, and striking out four. Amidst the Cardinals' competition for a playoff spot, Miller recorded his first major league win as a reliever in an extra inning game against the Los Angeles Dodgers on September 16.

Miller started his first major league game on October 3, against the Cincinnati Reds. Miller pitched six shutout innings, allowing only one hit, and striking out seven. He appeared twice in relief for the Cardinals during the 2012 National League Championship Series (NLCS) against the San Francisco Giants, allowing four hits and two runs in 3 1/3 innings. For the season, Miller completed 153 2/3 innings combined in the major league regular season, postseason and minor leagues.

==== 2013 regular season ====
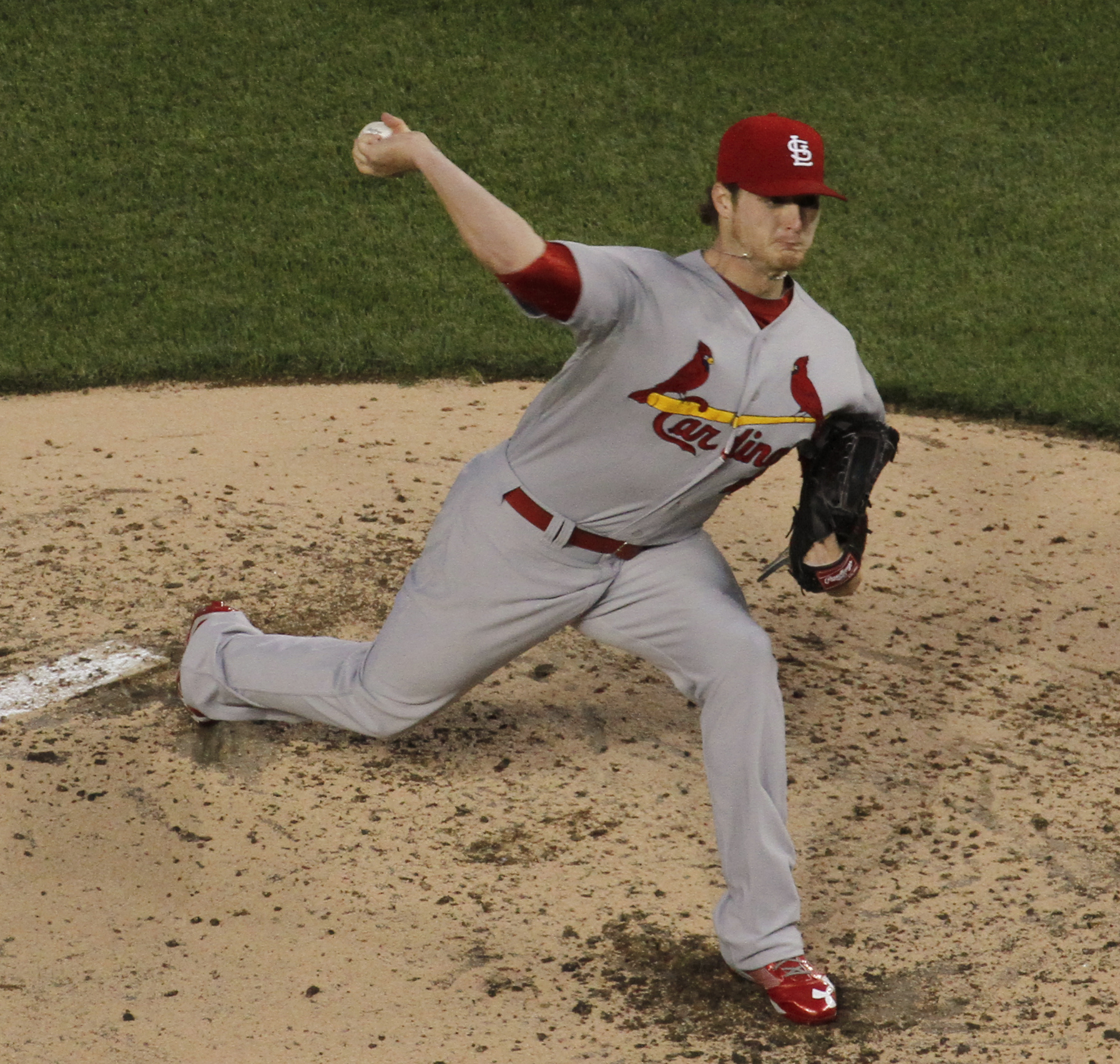
Miller pitching for the St. Louis Cardinals in 2013

Miller made the Cardinals' Opening Day starting rotation for the 2013 season, following a spring training competition with Joe Kelly for the final spot in the rotation. He threw his first career shutout in a 3–0 win against the Colorado Rockies on May 10, 2013. After allowing a bloop single to Eric Young, Jr. to begin the game, Miller pitched the equivalent of a perfect game by retiring the next 27 batters in a row. He threw 113 pitches, 84 for strikes. He walked none, striking out a career-high 13, which tied the Cardinals' rookie record, also held by Dick Hughes and Scipio Spinks. It was the closest a Cardinals' rookie came to throwing a no-hitter since Bud Smith performed the feat in 2001. His Game Score of 98 was the highest ever for a nine inning game thrown by a Cardinals pitcher. Miller's season performance vaunted him as an early Rookie of the Year award favorite. He won the Pitching Performance of the Month award for May because of his one-hit game on May 10. He had a 2–1 win–loss record, walking only six and striking out 32 for the month, while leading the NL with a 1.82 ERA.

The shortest start of Miller's career occurred in an August 7 start against the Los Angeles Dodgers. On the second pitch of the game, a line drive off Carl Crawford's bat glanced struck Miller's right elbow. He was removed from the game at that point. Follow-up x-rays were negative and the injury was characterized as an elbow contusion. His ERA to that point in the season was 2.89 and he averaged 9.8 K/9. On September 11, Miller continued his dominance over the Milwaukee Brewers, allowing five hits and striking out four in 6 2/3 innings. Despite Miller picking up his 14th win on September 15, his ERA from August 1 until that point was 3.60, raising it 3.19 for the season. In Miller's final start of the season, he won his 15th game, defeating the Washington Nationals. In turn, Jordan Zimmermann was denied his 20th victory. As teammate Adam Wainwright defeated the Chicago Cubs in his final start of the season on September 28, 2013, he tied Zimmermann for the league lead in wins. Miller's 15 wins tied for sixth and his 3.06 ERA was tenth in the NL.

==== 2013 postseason ====
Although Miller was on the roster for all three series in the Cardinals' 2013 postseason run, manager Mike Matheny did not place him in the starting rotation. Instead, he totaled a single inning in one relief appearance against the Pittsburgh Pirates in the 2013 National League Division Series (NLDS), in which he gave up one home run. Matheny rebuffed the suggestion that Miller was a "misspent asset" on the 25-man roster. He specified that, "He's going to be a guy we're going to use if we get into a situation where we’ve got a bunch of innings to eat up, whether it's at the front end or back. He's going to be our guy (if) we have to put things together."

After losing the World Series in six games to the Boston Red Sox, Matheny and general manager John Mozeliak explained that Miller's role was as "insurance." In just one game until Michael Wacha's final start – which was the final game of the year – did a starter go less than five innings. Miller also became less effective as the season progressed late, with his strikeout rate decreasing and walk rate increasing. Said Matheny, "It would have to be a situation where we were pushing into a tight spot, and that's just not fair to him without having much action to this point. He's been exactly what we’ve needed up to this point. Fortunately we haven't needed that long outing." Mozeliak added that "second-guessing the roster doesn't have traction. His role was always that insurance. There were a lot of question marks as we were going into this on exactly how our rotation was going to unfold. The fact that everybody has stepped up changed the dynamic."

After the season, Baseball America named Miller to their All-Rookie team as a starting pitcher. He finished third in the NL Rookie of the Year balloting.

==== 2014 season ====
Having struggled with walks, command, and mechanical inconsistencies the first two months of the 2014 season, Miller added a sinker to his repertoire with the help of Justin Masterson and defeated the Toronto Blue Jays 5–0 in a complete-game shutout, his first of the season and second of his career. He took a no-hitter into the sixth inning, faced 30 total batters while striking out five and enjoyed much more consistent command. He finished the season with a 3.74 ERA in 31 games started. Miller pitched Game 4 of the 2014 NLDS, which the Cardinals won, and Game 4 of the 2014 NLCS, where he struggled, failing to complete the fourth inning.

=== Atlanta Braves ===
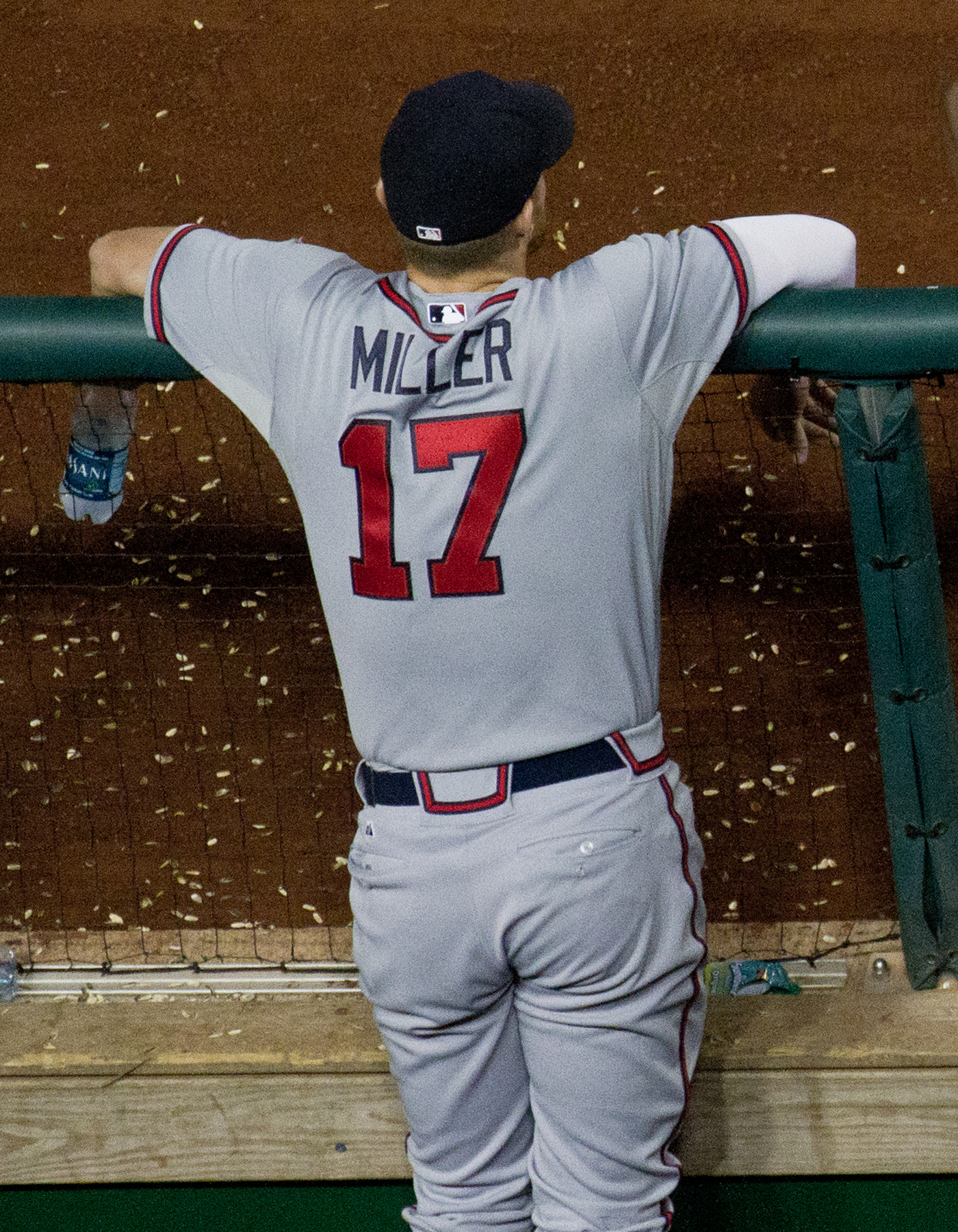
Miller with the Atlanta Braves in 2015

On November 17, 2014, the Cardinals traded Miller and prospect Tyrell Jenkins to the Atlanta Braves for outfielder Jason Heyward and relief pitcher Jordan Walden. On May 5, 2015, Miller threw a complete game shutout in just 99 pitches against the Philadelphia Phillies. Twelve days later, Miller was one out away from throwing a no-hitter against the Miami Marlins at Marlins Park when pinch hitter Justin Bour singled to break up the bid. Miller settled for a two-hit shutout, beating the Marlins 6–0. At that point in the season his record stood at 5–1 record, and his ERA at 1.33.

Miller was selected to his first All-Star Game via the player balloting. His ERA up to that point was 2.07, which was the third lowest in all of baseball. He did not appear in the All-Star Game. The two-hitter against the Marlins would serve as Miller's last win until his final start of the season, on October 4, when he pitched eight innings in a shutout effort against the St. Louis Cardinals. Miller set a new franchise record winless streak of 24, despite quality starts in fourteen of those games. His ERA during the streak was 3.83, and was marred by a rocky September, in which he recorded a 7.11 ERA. Until the October 4, 6–0 win against his former team, Miller's run support was at 2.3 runs per nine innings, ranking him third on a list of worst run support compiled since 1975. He finished the season with 2.6 runs of support per nine innings, a 6–17 record, 3.02 ERA, and 173 strikeouts. A run support average of 2.38 ranked tenth worst in MLB history.

=== Arizona Diamondbacks ===
On December 9, 2015, the Braves traded Miller and Gabe Speier to the Arizona Diamondbacks in exchange for Dansby Swanson, Ender Inciarte, and Aaron Blair. Following the trade, Miller agreed to a contract worth $4.35 million. Before the 2016 season began, Miller was projected to follow ace Zack Greinke in the rotation. He struggled once the season began, and was placed on the disabled list on May 24 due to a sprained index finger, making his return on June 20. Miller pitched to a 2–9 record and a 7.14 ERA through the MLB All-Star break, when the Diamondbacks optioned him to the Reno Aces of the PCL. Miller was recalled to start against the San Francisco Giants on August 31. He pitched five innings, yielding two runs on six hits. Miller finished the season with a 3–12 record and a 6.15 ERA, pitching 101 innings in 20 starts.

In February 2017, Miller was granted a contract worth $4.7 million via arbitration. On April 23, 2017, he was taken out of the game after being diagnosed with an apparent elbow injury. The next day, on April 24, Miller was put on the 10-day disabled list. After MRI tests, it was revealed that Miller's right elbow was diagnosed with a strained flexor strain and a partially torn UCL. On April 29, Miller announced that he would have Tommy John surgery, thereby ending his 2017 season. He officially underwent the surgery on May 10. Miller started four games, with a 2–2 record and 4.09 ERA in 22 innings. Due to Swanson's top prospect status, Inciarte's All-Star nod, Miller's extremely underwhelming 2016 season and Miller's season-ending injury in 2017, the trade has been panned as one of the worst in recent memory.

Prior to the start of the 2018 season, Miller's salary was decided by arbitration again. He received a $4.9 million deal. He was activated off the disabled list towards the end of June, but after four starts landed back on the disabled list with right elbow inflammation. On November 30, 2018, the Diamondbacks non-tendered Miller, making him a free agent.

=== Texas Rangers ===
On January 9, 2019, Miller joined the Texas Rangers on a one-year contract. On July 1, he was designated for assignment after posting a 1–3 record with an 8.59 ERA in 44 innings. Miller was released by the Rangers on July 4, 2019.

=== Milwaukee Brewers ===
On July 11, 2019, Miller signed a minor league contract with the Milwaukee Brewers. In 8 starts split between the rookie–level Arizona League Brewers and Triple–A San Antonio Missions, he compiled a 1–3 record and 4.13 ERA with 36 strikeouts across 32 2/3 innings pitched. On August 27, Miller opted out of his contract and was released by Milwaukee.

On January 27, 2020, Miller re-signed with the Brewers on a minor league deal. On August 3, Miller announced he would be opting out of the season due to the COVID-19 pandemic. He became a free agent on November 2.

=== Chicago Cubs ===
On January 17, 2021, Miller signed a minor league deal with the Chicago Cubs. He was added to the major league roster on April 14. After making three appearances in which he surrendered seven earned runs and recorded six outs, he was placed on the 10-day injured list with a lower back strain. He was sent to the Triple-A Iowa Cubs on rehab assignment on May 9. That night, Miller pitched the first three innings of a no-hitter against the Indianapolis Indians at Principal Park in Des Moines, Iowa. He struck out five batters and walked one before being relieved by Tommy Nance, Brad Wieck, and Ryan Meisinger who completed the combined no-hit game. On May 26, Miller was designated for assignment by Chicago after posting a 31.50 ERA in three appearances. On May 31, Miller was released by the Cubs.

=== Pittsburgh Pirates ===
On June 26, 2021, Miller signed a minor league contract with the Pittsburgh Pirates organization. Miller made 10 appearances for the Triple-A Indianapolis Indians, going 2–1 with a 3.86 ERA and 22 strikeouts. On September 1, 2021, Miller's contract was selected by the Pirates when the rosters expanded.

=== New York Yankees ===
On March 27, 2022, the New York Yankees signed Miller to a minor-league deal with an invite to the team's major-league spring training camp. Pitching for the Triple–A Scranton/Wilkes-Barre RailRiders, in 2022 he was 2–2 with four saves (the first saves of his professional career) and a 1.71 ERA in 21 innings over 16 relief appearances. On May 31, he was released by the organization.

=== San Francisco Giants ===
On June 8, 2022, the San Francisco Giants signed Miller to a minor league contract. He was assigned to the Triple-A Sacramento River Cats. On September 22, Miller had his contract selected to the major league roster. On September 29, Miller became the first pitcher in the modern era to have back–to–back outings with five or more strikeouts in less than three innings with no walks or runs allowed.

In 2022 with Sacramento, he was 0–2 with eight saves and a 3.62 ERA, in 32.1 innings over 27 games (one start) in which he struck out 44 batters. With the Giants, he was 0–1 with a 6.43 ERA, in 7 innings over four relief appearances in which he struck out 14 batters.

=== Los Angeles Dodgers ===
On December 1, 2022, Miller signed a $1.5 million contract with the Los Angeles Dodgers. On April 25, 2023, Miller recorded his first career save against the Pittsburgh Pirates. He was placed on the injured list with neck pain on June 21 and not activated until August 31. Overall, he pitched in 36 games, posting a 3–0 record to go with a 1.71 ERA. He became a free agent following the season.

=== Detroit Tigers ===
On December 22, 2023, Miller signed a one-year, $3 million contract with the Detroit Tigers that also included a $4.25 million club option for the following season. He made 51 appearances for Detroit in 2024, compiling a 6–8 record and 4.53 ERA with 49 strikeouts and two saves across 55 2/3 innings pitched. Miller was designated for assignment by the Tigers on September 24, 2024, in order to make room for their young star pitching prospect, Jackson Jobe. On September 29, Miller was placed on release waivers by the Tigers, making him a free agent.

=== Arizona Diamondbacks (second stint) ===
On February 16, 2025, Miller signed a minor league contract with the Arizona Diamondbacks organization. On March 26, the Diamondbacks selected Miller's contract after he made the team's Opening Day roster. He compiled a 3-3 record and a 1.98 ERA in 37 games with 40 strikeouts and 10 saves.

=== Milwaukee Brewers (second stint) ===
On July 31, 2025, the Diamondbacks traded Miller and Jordan Montgomery to the Milwaukee Brewers in exchange for a player to be named later. In 11 appearances for Milwaukee, he recorded a 5.59 ERA with 14 strikeouts across 9 2/3 innings pitched. Miller was removed from a game against the Philadelphia Phillies on September 1, and placed on the 60-day injured list with a sprained ulnar collateral ligament two days later. On October 20, it was announced that Miller would likely miss the 2026 season after undergoing surgery to repair his UCL and flexor tendon.

=== Chicago Cubs (second stint) ===
On February 15, 2026, Miller signed a two-year, $2.5 million contract with the Chicago Cubs. On September 15, Chicago officially shut down Miller for the remainder of the season.

== Pitching style ==
Whereas most starting pitchers utilize a fastball, a changeup, and a breaking ball, such as a slider or a curveball, Miller throws a fastball and curveball over 98% of the time. His fastball averages 94 miles per hour (151 km/h), while his curveball averages 79 mph.

== Awards ==
Major leagues

- Baseball America All-Rookie team, Starting pitcher (2013)
- Major League Baseball All-Star Game (2015)
- MLB.com Pitching Performance of the Month (May 2013)

Minor leagues

- Cardinals Minor League Pitcher of the Year (2010, 2011)
- Baseball America Minor League All-Star team (2011)
- MLB.com Top 50 prospects (2012, #5), (2013, #25)
- Baseball America Top 100 Minor League Prospects (2009, #50), (2010, #13), (2011, #8), (2012, #6)
- Baseball America Top Cardinals prospects (2009, #1), (2010, #1), (2011, #1), (2012, #2)
- Baseball America Cardinals' system Best Fastball (2009–11)

== Personal life ==
Miller has three sisters. His father, Mitch, is a member of the Brownwood Fire Department in Miller's hometown. His grandfather, Charles "Chuck" Pruett, was a decorated Army veteran who nurtured Miller's talent. Miller is married to Michigan native Erika Romans, who played volleyball at Milford High School. The two were wed on November 11, 2022, in Cabo. In 2021, Miller's son Kyler was diagnosed with STXBP1 encephalopathy, a rare genetic disorder.
