= J. L. Hunter "Red" Rountree =

American bank robber (1911–2004)

J. L. Hunter "Red" Rountree (December 16, 1911, in Brownwood, Texas – October 12, 2004, in Springfield, Missouri) was an American folk hero who was believed to have been the world's oldest active bank robber. On August 12, 2003, Rountree walked into the First American Bank (now Citibank N.A.) in Abilene, Texas, to hand a large envelope to the teller marked "robbery." Moments later, Rountree sped off in a 1996 Buick Regal with $2,000.00 in small bills. He was arrested shortly thereafter when a witness wrote down his car license plate number.

The robbery at First American Bank was his third in five years. Rountree's first robbery took place in 1998 when at the age of 86, he held up SouthTrust Bank in Biloxi, Mississippi. He was arrested shortly afterward and was later convicted. Rountree was sentenced to three years probation. His second robbery was at Nations Bank in Pensacola, Florida. He was again caught and convicted, this time receiving a sentence of three years in prison. Rountree's third and final heist earned the then 91-year-old man 12 years in federal prison. He died at US Medical Center for Federal Prisoners in Springfield, Missouri on October 12, 2004.

Rountree claimed the loss of a considerable fortune, including the Rountree Machinery Company, was the motivation for his crimes. He believed a Corpus Christi, Texas bank was responsible for his personal bankruptcy.

A documentary based on the story of Rountree, This Is Not A Robbery was an official selection for the 2008 Tribeca Film Festival in New York City. The film was directed by Lucas Jansen and Adam Kurland.
