= Brownwood Regional Airport =

Airport in Texas, United States

Brownwood Regional Airport Brownwood Army Airfield
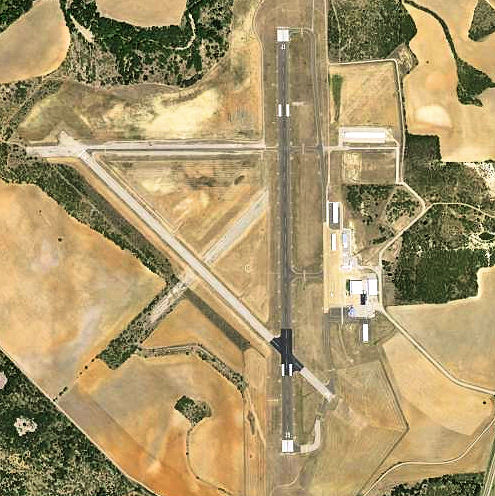
- USGS 2006 orthophoto
- IATA: BWD; ICAO: KBWD; FAA LID: BWD

Summary
- Airport type: Public
- Owner: City of Brownwood
- Serves: Brownwood, Texas
- Elevation AMSL: 1,387 ft (423 m)
- Coordinates: 31°47′37″N 098°57′23″W

Map
- Location in Texas

Runways
Direction	Length		Surface
Direction	ft	m	Surface
17/35	5,599	1,707	Asphalt
13/31	4,608	1,405	Asphalt

Statistics (2020)
- Aircraft operations (year ending 5/15/2020): 7,600
- Based aircraft: 34
- Source: Federal Aviation Administration

Brownwood Regional Airport (IATA: BWD, ICAO: KBWD, FAA LID: BWD) is in Brownwood, six miles north of downtown. The National Plan of Integrated Airport Systems for 2011–2015 categorized it as a general aviation facility. The 21st Cavalry Brigade of the III Corps, U.S. Army uses the airport for training in Apache and Blackhawk helicopters.

The airport has been served by several airlines in the past including Trans Texas/Texas International, Lone Star Airlines, and Big Sky Airlines. Service was subsidized by the Essential Air Service program until March 13, 2005, when it ended due to federal law not allowing a subsidy over $200 per passenger for communities within 210 miles of the nearest large or medium hub airport (Brownwood is 145 miles from Austin-Bergstrom International Airport, a medium hub.) Federal Aviation Administration records say Brownwood Regional Airport had 1,764 passenger boardings (enplanements) in calendar year 2003, 1,417 in 2004 and 232 in 2005.

== History ==
The airport opened during World War II as Brownwood Army Airfield and was used by the United States Army Air Forces as a training base.

The 68th and 77th Reconnaissance Groups trained at Brownwood during 1942 with a variety of aircraft, including B-17 Flying Fortress, B-24 Liberators, P-40 Warhawks and A-20 Havocs. In addition to the training performed at the airfield, patrols were flown over the Gulf of Mexico and along the Mexican border. The role of the Brownwood Army Airfield from November, 1943, to September, 1944 was to operate as a refresher school and replacement training unit for liaison pilots within the Third Air Force. One of the primary aircraft used in this role was the Stinson L-5. In October, 1944, the airfield became the new combat crew training center. From January, 1945, until the end of World War II, the primary mission of the Brownwood Army Airfield was the training and preparation of combat crews for overseas replacement.

The U.S. Government deeded the airport to the City of Brownwood after World War II. An F-4 Phantom and an F-111 are on display.

=== Historical airline service ===
Trans-Texas Airways (TTA) began serving Brownwood in 1947 on a route between El Paso and Dallas which contained several other stops. The airline began flying Douglas DC-3's and upgraded to Convair 240 and Convair 600 turboprops in the 1960's. TTA changed its name to Texas International Airlines in 1969 and direct flights to Albuquerque were operated periodically. All service ended in 1976.

Eagle Commuter Airlines served BWD from 1976 through 1986 with flights to DFW, San Angelo, Austin, San Antonio, and Houston using Piper Navajo aircraft.

Wise Airlines briefly served BWD in 1985 using Beechcraft 99 aircraft to DFW.

Lone Star Airlines served BWD from 1987 through 1998 with flights to DFW using Piper Navajo and Swearingen Metroliner aircraft.

Big Sky Airlines served BWD from 1999 through 2002 using Swearingen Metroliners to DFW.

Air Midwest, operating as Mesa Airlines served BWD from 2002 until 2005 when EAS funding had ended. The carrier used Beechcraft 1900D aircraft.

== Facilities ==
The airport covers 1,497 acres (606 ha) at an elevation of 1,387 feet (423 m). It has two asphalt runways: 17/35 is 5,599 by 100 feet (1,707 x 30 m) and 13/31 is 4,608 by 101 feet (1,405 x 31 m).

== Cargo airlines ==
Airlines	Destinations
FedEx Express	Austin

In the year ending May 15, 2020, the airport had 7,600 aircraft operations, average 21 per day: 83% general aviation, 16% air taxi, and 1% military. 34 aircraft were then based at the airport: 29 single-engine, 4 multi-engine, and 1 helicopter.

== See also ==
- Texas World War II Army Airfields
- List of airports in Texas

== Other sources ==
- This article incorporates public domain material from the Air Force Historical Research Agency
- Essential Air Service documents (Docket OST-1997-2402) from the U.S. Department of Transportation:
  - Order 97-4-29 (April 28, 1997): tentatively reselecting Lone Star Airlines to provide subsidized essential air service (EAS) at Enid and Ponca City, Oklahoma, and Brownwood, Texas, for the two-year period beginning March l, 1997.
  - Order 99-12-28 (December 29, 1999): reselects Big Sky Transportation, d/b/a Big Sky Airlines (Big Sky), to provide subsidized essential air service (EAS) at El Dorado/Camden, Jonesboro, Harrison, and Hot Springs, Arkansas, Enid and Ponca City, Oklahoma, and Brownwood, Texas, for a new two-year term at a combined subsidy rate of $6,712,448 annually effective December 1, 1999, through November 30, 2001.
  - Order 2001-11-14 (November 28, 2011): extending the final subsidy rates of Mesa Airlines at Oil City/Franklin, Pennsylvania and Gallup, New Mexico; Great Lakes Aviation at North Platte, Nebraska; and Big Sky Airlines at Enid and Ponca City, Oklahoma, Brownwood, Texas, and Hot Springs, Harrison, Eldorado/Camden and Jonesboro, Arkansas.
  - Order 2002-7-2 (July 1, 2002): selecting Air Midwest, Inc., to provide essential air service at seven communities (El Dorado/Camden, AR; Jonesboro, AR; Harrison, AR; Hot Springs, AR; Enid, OK; Ponca City, OK; Brownwood, TX) for a two-year period at subsidy rates totaling $6,693,881 annually.
  - Order 2004-6-12 (June 14, 2004): requests interested persons to show cause why it should not terminate the essential air service subsidy eligibility of Jonesboro, Arkansas, Enid and Ponca City, Oklahoma, and Brownwood, Texas, and allow Air Midwest to suspend its subsidized services at those communities as of October 1, 2004, when the current rate term expires.
  - Order 2005-1-14 (January 19, 2005): selecting Air Midwest, Inc., to provide essential air service at El Dorado/Camden, Jonesboro, Harrison and Hot Springs, Arkansas, at a subsidy rate of $4,155,550 annually for a two-year rate term; selecting Great Lakes Aviation, Ltd., to provide essential air service at Enid and Ponca City, Oklahoma, at a subsidy rate of $1,272,557 annually for a two-year rate term; terminating the subsidy eligibility of Brownwood, Texas, and allowing Air Midwest to discontinue its service there, if it chooses to do so.
