= Early, Texas =

- City
- Motto: "A Wonderful Place to Spend the Rest of Your Life"
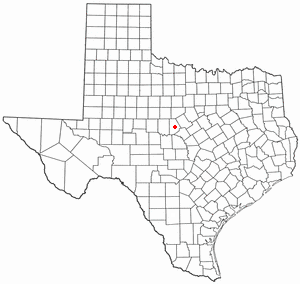
- Location of Early, Texas

- Coordinates: 31°44′41″N 98°56′28″W
- Country: United States
- State: Texas
- County: Brown

Area
  - Total: 3.73 sq mi (9.65 km^{2})
  - Land: 3.73 sq mi (9.65 km^{2})
  - Water: 0 sq mi (0.00 km^{2})
- Elevation: 1,411 ft (430 m)

Population (2020)
  - Total: 3,087
  - Density: 829/sq mi (320/km^{2})
- Time zone: UTC-6 (Central (CST))
  - Summer (DST): UTC-5 (CDT)
- ZIP code: 76802
- Area code: 325
- FIPS code: 48-21904
- GNIS feature ID: 2410383
- Website: www.earlytx.net

Early is a city located in Brown County in west-central Texas, United States. It is a suburb of Brownwood, and the population was 3,087 at the 2020 census. It is named for Walter U. Early, who donated land for the local schools. It is home to the Early Independent School District and the Heartland Mall.

== Geography ==
Early is located near the center of Brown County at 31°44′41″N 98°56′28″W (31.744601, –98.941171). The Pecan Bayou, a tributary of the Colorado River, runs past the western end of the city, with the city of Brownwood on the opposite side of the river. According to the United States Census Bureau, Early has a total area of 3.73 square miles (9.65 km^{2}), all land.

=== Climate ===
The climate in this area is characterized by hot, humid summers and generally mild to cool winters. According to the Köppen climate classification, Early has a humid subtropical climate, Cfa on climate maps.

== Demographics ==
Historical population
| Census | Pop. | Note | %± |
|---|---|---|---|
| 1960 | 819 | | — |
| 1970 | 1,097 | | 33.9% |
| 1980 | 2,313 | | 110.8% |
| 1990 | 2,380 | | 2.9% |
| 2000 | 2,588 | | 8.7% |
| 2010 | 2,762 | | 6.7% |
| 2020 | 3,087 | | 11.8% |
U.S. Decennial Census

=== 2020 census ===
As of the 2020 census, Early had a population of 3,087 in 1,217 households and 765 families, with a median age of 40.1 years. 23.8% of residents were under the age of 18 and 19.2% of residents were 65 years of age or older; for every 100 females there were 92.6 males and for every 100 females age 18 and over there were 91.5 males age 18 and over.

Racial composition as of the 2020 census
| Race | Number | Percent |
|---|---|---|
| White | 2,520 | 81.6% |
| Black or African American | 42 | 1.4% |
| American Indian and Alaska Native | 39 | 1.3% |
| Asian | 64 | 2.1% |
| Native Hawaiian and Other Pacific Islander | 0 | 0.0% |
| Some other race | 123 | 4.0% |
| Two or more races | 299 | 9.7% |
| Hispanic or Latino (of any race) | 522 | 16.9% |

There were 1,217 households in Early, of which 33.4% had children under the age of 18 living in them. Of all households, 53.0% were married-couple households, 15.9% were households with a male householder and no spouse or partner present, and 26.9% were households with a female householder and no spouse or partner present. About 24.3% of all households were made up of individuals and 9.9% had someone living alone who was 65 years of age or older.

There were 1,361 housing units, of which 10.6% were vacant. The homeowner vacancy rate was 2.0% and the rental vacancy rate was 13.1%.

90.9% of residents lived in urban areas, while 9.1% lived in rural areas.

=== 2000 census ===
As of the census of 2000, 2,588 people, 980 households, and 752 families resided in the city. The population density was 1,008.2 inhabitants per square mile (389.3/km^{2}). There were 1,080 housing units at an average density of 420.7 per square mile (162.4/km^{2}). The racial makeup of the city was 94.17% White, 1.00% African American, 0.35% Native American, 0.58% Asian, 0.04% Pacific Islander, 3.25% from other races, and 0.62% from two or more races. Hispanics or Latinos of any race were 9.12% of the population.

Of the 980 households, 39.0% had children under the age of 18 living with them, 62.0% were married couples living together, 11.7% had a female householder with no husband present, and 23.2% were not families. About 20.5% of all households were made up of individuals, and 10.5% had someone living alone who was 65 years of age or older. The average household size was 2.64 and the average family size was 3.01.

In the city, the population was distributed as 29.3% under the age of 18, 7.3% from 18 to 24, 27.3% from 25 to 44, 21.9% from 45 to 64, and 14.2% who were 65 years of age or older. The median age was 36 years. For every 100 females, there were 92.6 males. For every 100 females age 18 and over, there were 87.5 males.

The median income for a household in the city was $36,150, and for a family was $44,861. Males had a median income of $31,902 versus $20,694 for females. The per capita income for the city was $18,755. About 11.0% of families and 13.5% of the population were below the poverty line, including 16.7% of those under age 18 and 3.5% of those age 65 or over.
