= Brownwood, Texas =

- City
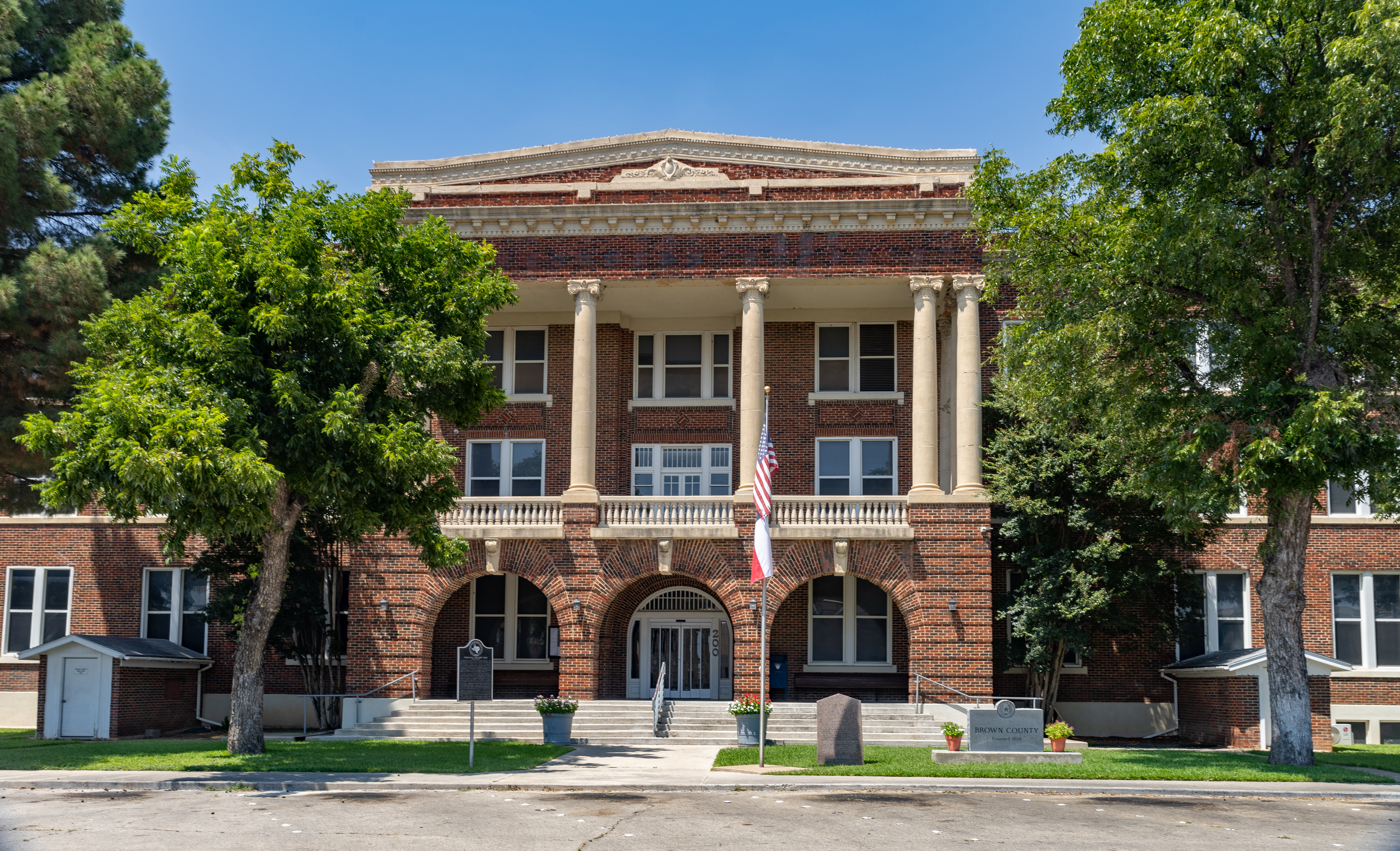
- Brown County Courthouse
- Interactive map of Brownwood, Texas
- Coordinates: 31°42′46″N 98°58′48″W
- Country: United States
- State: Texas
- County: Brown

Government
  - Type: Council-Manager

Area
  - Total: 14.99 sq mi (38.83 km^{2})
  - Land: 14.97 sq mi (38.76 km^{2})
  - Water: 0.027 sq mi (0.07 km^{2})
- Elevation: 1,339 ft (408 m)

Population (2020)
  - Total: 18,862
  - Density: 1,233.1/sq mi (476.11/km^{2})
- Time zone: UTC-6 (CST)
  - Summer (DST): UTC-6 (CDT)
- ZIP Codes: 76801-76804
- Area code: 325
- FIPS code: 48-10780
- GNIS feature ID: 2409925
- Website: brownwoodtexas.gov

Brownwood is a city in and the county seat of Brown County, Texas, United States. The population was 18,862 as of the 2020 census. Brownwood is in the Texas Hill Country and is home to Howard Payne University, which was founded in 1889.

== History ==
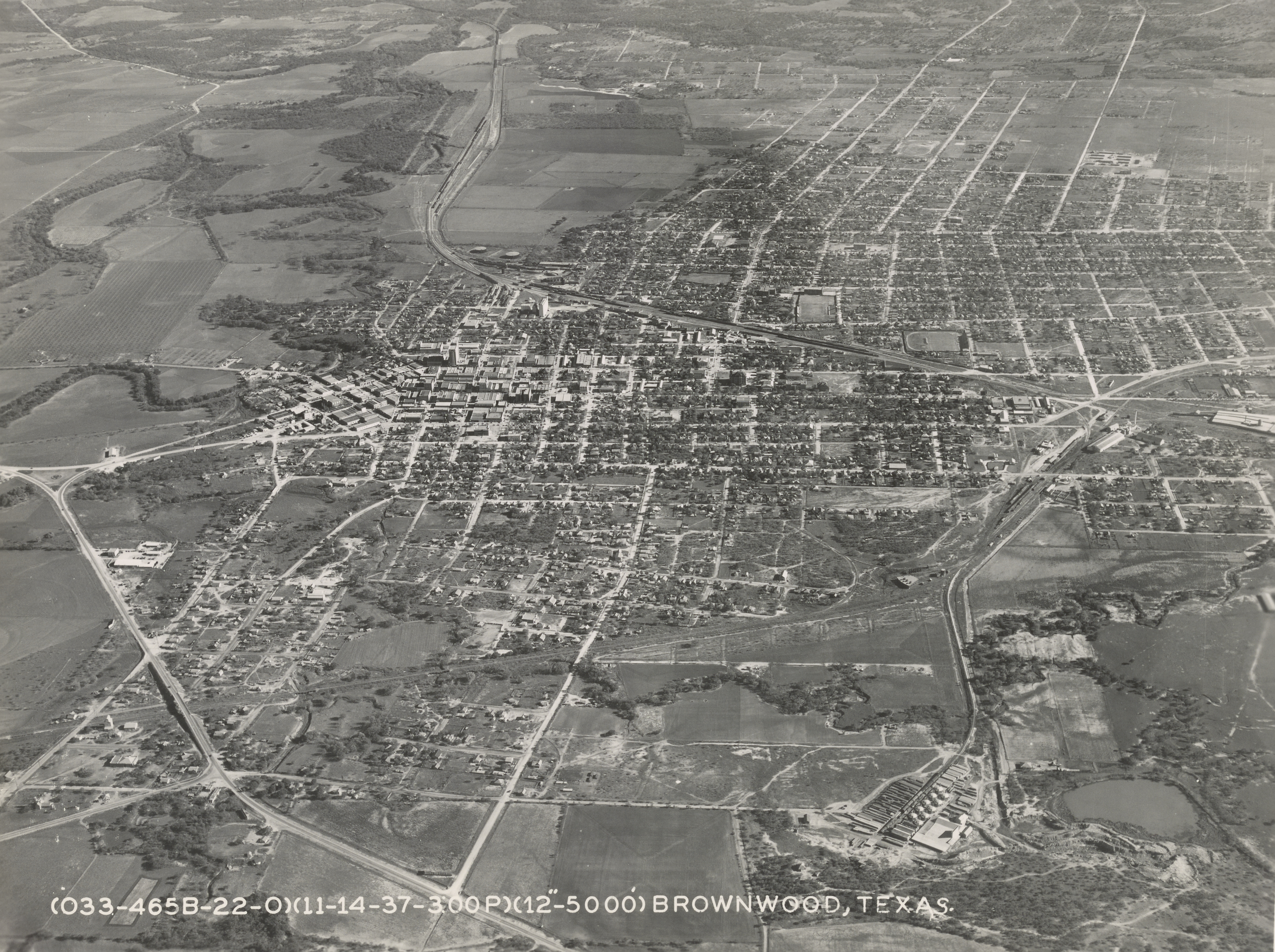
Brownwood in 1937

The original site of the Brown County seat of Brownwood was east of Pecan Bayou. A dispute arose over land and water rights, and the settlers were forced to find a new location. Greenleaf Fisk donated 60 acres (24 ha) to relocate the county seat to the west side of the bayou, on what is now the current site of Brownwood, and 100 additional acres for county use. The town was incorporated in 1884.

During the Second World War, Brownwood was the location of U.S. Army Camp Bowie, which had a peak complement of over 80,000 soldiers. Camp Bowie serves as a training camp today at the intersection Farm-to-Market Roads 45 and 2126.

On April 19, 1976, an F5 tornado struck near Brownwood, causing extensive damage, with 11 reported injuries, but no fatalities.

Brownwood's census figures were re-evaluated after the 2000 census from 18,813 to reflect more accurate figures of 20,407. The city was categorized in 2003 as a micropolitan statistical area. The federal Office of Management and Budget has issued a definition of micropolitan statistical areas as "an urban cluster of at least 10,000, but less than 50,000 population, plus adjacent territory that has a high degree of social and economic integration with the core, as measured by commuting ties."

A dispute over water rights created the adjacent city of Early. The two cities are separated by the Pecan Bayou, one of five major tributaries of the Colorado River of Texas.

== Geography ==
Brownwood is south of the center of Brown County, west of the Pecan Bayou. It is bordered to the east by the city of Early. Several U.S. Highways pass through the city. Routes 84 and 67 lead west toward Bangs and Santa Anna. U.S. Route 377 leads southwest toward Brady. All three highways head east into Early, where 67 and 377 continue northeast toward Comanche, while 84 leads southeast toward Goldthwaite. Just over the city line in Early, U.S. Route 183 leads north 46 miles (74 km) to Cisco and Interstate 20, the closest Interstate highway.

According to the United States Census Bureau, Brownwood has an area of 14.9 square miles (38.5 km^{2}), of which 14.8 square miles (38.4 km^{2}) is land and 0.04 sq mi (0.1 km^{2}), or 0.17%, is water.

=== Climate ===
The climate in this area is characterized by hot, humid summers and generally mild to cool winters. According to the Köppen climate classification, Brownwood has a humid subtropical climate, Cfa on climate maps.

Climate data for Brownwood, Texas, 1991–2020 normals, extremes 1893–present
Month	Jan	Feb	Mar	Apr	May	Jun	Jul	Aug	Sep	Oct	Nov	Dec	Year
Record high °F (°C)	91 (33)	100 (38)	99 (37)	104 (40)	108 (42)	111 (44)	113 (45)	111 (44)	109 (43)	103 (39)	94 (34)	92 (33)	113 (45)
Mean maximum °F (°C)	80.6 (27.0)	83.9 (28.8)	88.8 (31.6)	94.1 (34.5)	97.5 (36.4)	100.8 (38.2)	103.4 (39.7)	104.1 (40.1)	99.5 (37.5)	94.2 (34.6)	85.6 (29.8)	79.9 (26.6)	105.7 (40.9)
Mean daily maximum °F (°C)	59.5 (15.3)	63.5 (17.5)	70.9 (21.6)	78.8 (26.0)	85.3 (29.6)	92.7 (33.7)	96.5 (35.8)	96.9 (36.1)	89.6 (32.0)	80.3 (26.8)	68.7 (20.4)	60.8 (16.0)	78.6 (25.9)
Daily mean °F (°C)	45.6 (7.6)	49.8 (9.9)	57.3 (14.1)	65.1 (18.4)	73.5 (23.1)	80.9 (27.2)	84.3 (29.1)	84.3 (29.1)	77.0 (25.0)	66.7 (19.3)	55.4 (13.0)	47.4 (8.6)	65.6 (18.7)
Mean daily minimum °F (°C)	31.7 (−0.2)	36.0 (2.2)	43.7 (6.5)	51.4 (10.8)	61.6 (16.4)	69.1 (20.6)	72.2 (22.3)	71.7 (22.1)	64.5 (18.1)	53.1 (11.7)	42.2 (5.7)	34.0 (1.1)	52.6 (11.4)
Mean minimum °F (°C)	17.9 (−7.8)	21.0 (−6.1)	25.9 (−3.4)	35.0 (1.7)	45.8 (7.7)	60.1 (15.6)	66.0 (18.9)	64.0 (17.8)	50.4 (10.2)	35.4 (1.9)	25.3 (−3.7)	19.8 (−6.8)	14.9 (−9.5)
Record low °F (°C)	−2 (−19)	0 (−18)	10 (−12)	26 (−3)	34 (1)	46 (8)	53 (12)	48 (9)	37 (3)	19 (−7)	12 (−11)	−6 (−21)	−6 (−21)
Average precipitation inches (mm)	1.60 (41)	2.20 (56)	2.39 (61)	2.38 (60)	4.25 (108)	3.75 (95)	2.04 (52)	2.63 (67)	2.88 (73)	3.43 (87)	1.72 (44)	1.37 (35)	30.64 (779)
Average snowfall inches (cm)	0.2 (0.51)	0.3 (0.76)	0.0 (0.0)	0.2 (0.51)	0.0 (0.0)	0.0 (0.0)	0.0 (0.0)	0.0 (0.0)	0.0 (0.0)	0.0 (0.0)	0.2 (0.51)	0.4 (1.0)	1.3 (3.29)
Average precipitation days (≥ 0.01 in)	4.3	4.6	5.0	4.5	7.2	6.0	3.8	4.6	4.7	4.7	4.4	4.1	57.9
Average snowy days (≥ 0.1 in)	0.1	0.2	0.0	0.0	0.0	0.0	0.0	0.0	0.0	0.0	0.1	0.2	0.6
Source 1: NOAA
Source 2: National Weather Service

== Water bodies ==
Lake Brownwood is 7 miles (11 km) north of the city. The lake is a 7,300-acre (30 km^{2}) reservoir created by damming the Pecan Bayou. There are a wide variety of fish in the lake: largemouth bass, smallmouth bass, white bass, striped bass, white crappie, yellow and flathead catfish, sunfish (perch), and alligator gar. Camping, waterskiing, jet skiing, and boating are available. It is home of Lake Brownwood State Park, a 538-acre (2.18 km^{2}) area that opened in 1938.

Pecan Bayou is a major tributary of the Colorado River. Due to the damming of the area to form Lake Brownwood, the bayou has a shallow depth and little flow downstream from Brownwood. During heavy rains, the bayou often floods. It runs northwest to southeast and serves as a boundary between Brownwood and Early.

== Demographics ==
Historical population
Census	Pop.	Note	%±
1880	725		—
1890	2,176		200.1%
1900	3,965		82.2%
1910	6,967		75.7%
1920	8,223		18.0%
1930	12,789		55.5%
1940	13,398		4.8%
1950	20,181		50.6%
1960	16,974		−15.9%
1970	17,368		2.3%
1980	19,396		11.7%
1990	18,387		−5.2%
2000	18,813		2.3%
2010	19,288		2.5%
2020	18,862		−2.2%
U.S. Decennial Census

=== 2020 census ===
As of the 2020 census, there were 18,862 people, 7,428 households, and 4,367 families residing in the city.

The median age was 36.3 years; 24.6% of residents were under the age of 18 and 17.2% of residents were 65 years of age or older, and there were 91.6 males for every 100 females overall and 87.9 males for every 100 females age 18 and over.

98.7% of residents lived in urban areas, while 1.3% lived in rural areas.

There were 7,428 households in Brownwood, of which 31.2% had children under the age of 18 living in them. Of all households, 39.9% were married-couple households, 20.9% were households with a male householder and no spouse or partner present, and 32.6% were households with a female householder and no spouse or partner present. About 32.8% of all households were made up of individuals and 14.0% had someone living alone who was 65 years of age or older.

There were 8,539 housing units, of which 13.0% were vacant. Among occupied housing units, 55.1% were owner-occupied and 44.9% were renter-occupied. The homeowner vacancy rate was 2.4% and the rental vacancy rate was 11.3%.

Racial composition as of the 2020 census
Race	Percent
White	70.4%
Black or African American	5.4%
American Indian and Alaska Native	0.5%
Asian	0.8%
Native Hawaiian and Other Pacific Islander	0.1%
Some other race	9.8%
Two or more races	12.9%
Hispanic or Latino (of any race)	28.6%

Brownwood racial composition (NH = Non-Hispanic) (Note: Note: the US Census treats Hispanic/Latino as an ethnic category. This table excludes Latinos from the racial categories and assigns them to a separate category. Hispanics/Latinos can be of any race.)
Race	Number	Percentage
White (NH)	11,611	61.56%
Black or African American (NH)	948	5.03%
Native American or Alaska Native (NH)	35	0.19%
Asian (NH)	146	0.77%
Pacific Islander (NH)	27	0.14%
Some Other Race (NH)	66	0.35%
Mixed/Multi-Racial (NH)	628	3.33%
Hispanic or Latino	5,401	28.63%
Total	18,862	

=== 2000 census ===
As of the census of 2000, 18,813 people, 7,110 households, and 4,664 families resided in the city. The population density was 1,493.2 inhabitants per square mile (576.5/km^{2}). The 8,169 housing units averaged 648.4 per square mile (250.3/km^{2}). The racial makeup of the city was 82.74% White, 5.51% African American, 0.61% Native American, 0.60% Asian, 8.47% from other races, and 2.07% from two or more races. Hispanics or Latinos of any race were 21.34% of the population.

Of the 7,110 households, 32.2% had children under the age of 18 living with them, 48.5% were married couples living together, 13.7% had a female householder with no husband present, and 34.4% were not families. About 30.1% of all households were made up of individuals, and 13.8% had someone living alone who was 65 years of age or older. The average household size was 2.46 and the average family size was 3.05.

In the city, the population was distributed as 27.5% under the age of 18, 12.8% from 18 to 24, 24.3% from 25 to 44, 19.2% from 45 to 64, and 16.2% who were 65 years of age or older. The median age was 33 years. For every 100 females, there were 90.6 males. For every 100 females age 18 and over, there were 84.1 males.

The median income for a household in the city was $27,325, and for a family was $33,991. Males had a median income of $29,090 versus $18,905 for females. The per capita income for the city was $14,158. About 18.2% of families and 21.4% of the population were below the poverty line, including 28.9% of those under age 18 and 12.8% of those age 65 or over.

== Government and infrastructure ==
The Texas Juvenile Justice Department operates the Ron Jackson State Juvenile Correctional Complex in Brownwood.

The Texas Department of Criminal Justice operates the Brownwood District Parole Office in the city.

The United States Postal Service operates the Brownwood Post Office.

== Education ==
Almost all of the city is in the Brownwood Independent School District. The portion around Brownwood Regional Airport is in the Early Independent School District.

Brownwood High School has a strong tradition of nonsports UIL participation, including academic competitions and drama (one-act plays). Other opportunities for student participation include band, DECA, FFA, drill team (the Lionettes), Key Club, student council, Students Against Destructive Decisions, and National Honor Society.

The BHS mascot is the lion, with school colors of maroon and white. The school was tied for most state championships in high school football, with seven, the last coming in 1981, until Celina won its eighth state championship in 2007. Gordon Wood, who coached at Brownwood High for a quarter-century, retired in 1985 as one of the greatest coaches in Texas history, with 396 wins. He was recently surpassed by former Celina and Pilot Point coach G. A. Moore. Many athletes from surrounding communities move to Brownwood to play for the maroon and white.

Brownwood is home to Howard Payne University. The university's teams achieved national championship status in 1957 and 1964 in NAIA Cross Country, and in 2008 with NCAA Division III Women's Basketball. The Douglas MacArthur Academy of Freedom, a museum with recreations of famous rooms in American history, such as Independence Hall, and a 32-foot-high (9.8 m) mural depicting Biblical history, is on the Howard Payne campus.

Brownwood is also the home of a West Texas campus of the Texas State Technical College System. Computer-aided drafting and design, digital imaging and design, software and business accounting, associate degree nursing, chemical dependency counseling, health information technology, computer network systems and administration, computer science database and web programming technology, emergency medical technology (paramedics), mechatronics, and welding technology are some of the courses offered at the TSTC campus.

== Transportation ==
Brownwood is served by the following highways: US 67, US 84, US 183, US 377, and Texas State Highway 279. The Burlington Northern Santa Fe Railroad, Fort Worth and Western Railroad, and Texas Rock Crusher Railway also serve the Brownwood area.

Brownwood is served by Brownwood Regional Airport. The airport has two runways: 17/35, a 5599 × 150-ft (1707 × 46-m) asphalt runway (30,000 lb per wheel), and 13/31, a 4596 × 100-ft (1401 × 30-m) asphalt runway (25,000 lb per wheel). Mostly cargo and private air operations take place at the airport, although Mesa Airlines formerly offered regional connections.

== Notable people ==
- Cofféy Anderson, American country singer-songwriter
- Candy Barr, stripper, burlesque dancer, actress
- Bob Denver, actor
- Larry Elkins - former American football player.
- Jerry Don Gleaton, Major League Baseball pitcher
- Graham Harrell, Texas Tech Red Raiders quarterback (2006–2008)
- Tam Hollingshead, former Texas A&M football coach
- Shawn Hollingsworth, American football player
- Robert E. Howard, creator of Conan the Barbarian
- Case Keenum, NFL quarterback
- Joe M. Kilgore, former U.S. representative from Texas
- Tom Lovell, Scottish-American builder
- Matthew McCrane, kicker
- Shelby Miller, pitcher for the Texas Rangers
- Jim Morris, pitcher and coach
- Casey Pachall, quarterback for Texas Christian University
- Paul & Paula, or Ray Hildebrand and Jill Jackson, singers
- Josh Rosenthal, singer-songwriter
- J. L. Hunter "Red" Rountree, the oldest bank robber in history
- George M. Shelton, Medal of Honor recipient
- John Paul Stapp, United States Air Force colonel
- Glenn Strange, played Sam the Bartender on CBS's Gunsmoke
- Madylin, Sullivan, and Sawyer Sweeten the Barone children on Everybody Loves Raymond
- Jack Taylor, mayor of Mesa, Arizona
- Jim Thomason, football halfback for Texas A&M University
- Kenny Vaccaro, former NFL safety
- Clint Walker, star of the 1955–1963 television series Cheyenne
- Walt Williams, Major League Baseball player
- Drew Womack, country music singer-songwriter
- Gordon Wood head Texas high school football coach at Brownwood
- Bob Young, football offensive guard and World's Strongest Man contestant
- Doug Young, champion powerlifter (1975, 1976 and 1977)
