= Layland Museum of History =

Local history museum in Johnson county, Texas

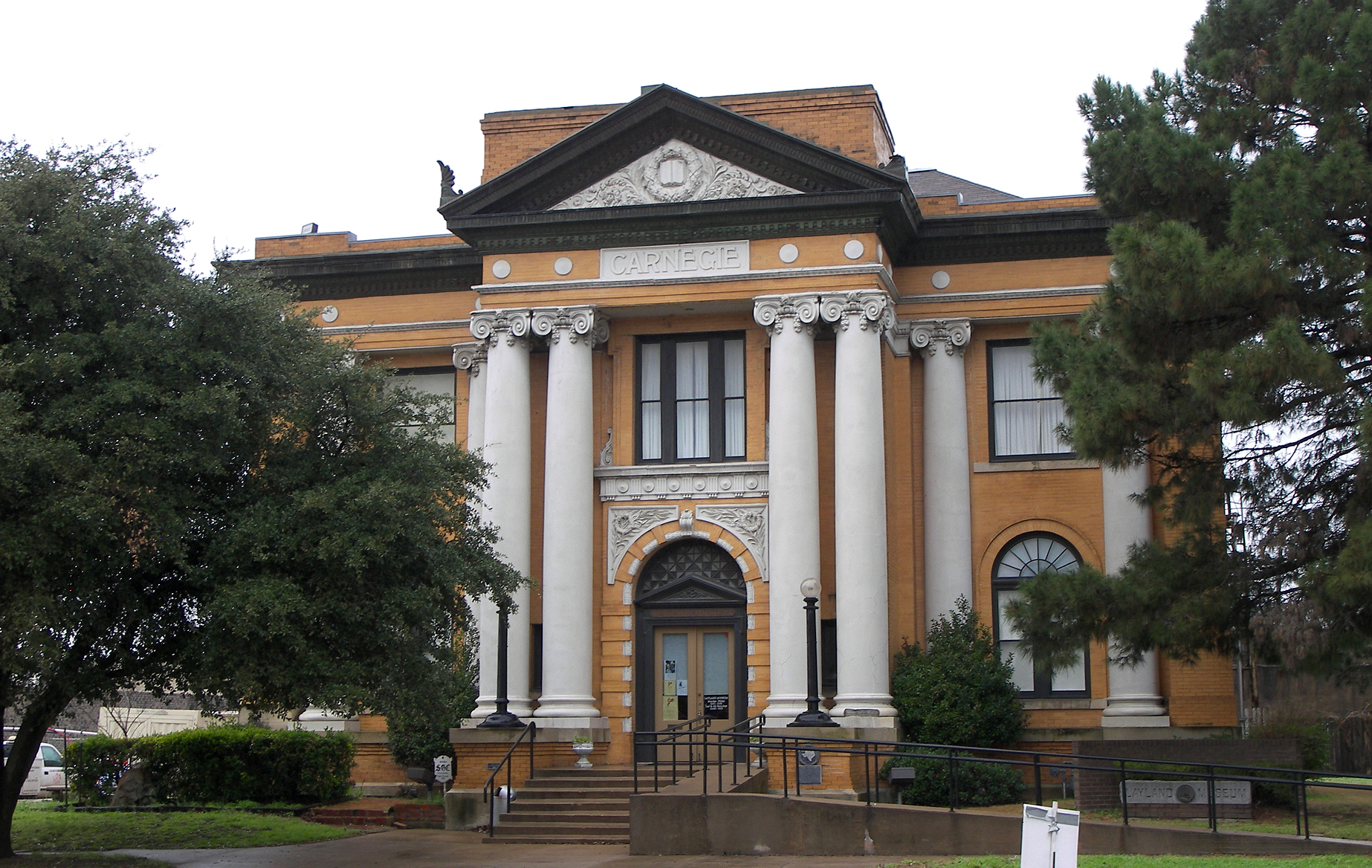
- View of the east facade
- Established: 1963
- Location: 201 N. Caddo St. Cleburne, TX
- Coordinates: 32°20′54.93″N 97°23′11.13″W
- Type: History
- Website: Official website
- Cleburne Carnegie Building
- U.S. Historic district – Contributing property
- Recorded Texas Historic Landmark
- Built: 1905
- Architect: Smith and Moore
- Part of: Cleburne Downtown Historic District (ID100002844)
- RTHL No.: 731

Significant dates
- Designated CP: August 31, 2018
- Designated RTHL: 1981

The Layland Museum of History is a city run museum located in the Downtown Historic District of Cleburne. The museum specializes in local prehistoric, first peoples, 19th and 20th century history. The Cleburne Parks and Recreation Department runs the museum, and contains over 50,000 artifacts and 100,000 photos that preserve local history. It operated on the top floor of the building until 1978, when it gained full access after the library moved to a new facility. The museum operates out two buildings, the Clebunre Carnegie Building and the Smith History Center. The collection began with the museums namesake, William J. Layland's heirs gifting the collection to the city. Other local contributions would continue to expand the collection to its current size.

The museums building began life as the Cleburne Carnegie Library. In 1902, the Women's Club of Cleburne would contact the Carnegie Foundation to secure funding for a new library. A $20,000 grant, along with a matching fund by the locals, led to the completion of the Library in 1905. Designed by Smith and Moore, The library was built in the Classical Revival style. The neighboring building would eventually become the Smith History Center, whose purpose is to store the rest of the collection currently not on display. The research library is also located within the history center.

== History ==
In 1901, The Women's Club of Cleburne was formed, whose specific goal was to create a public library for Cleburne. Under the leadership of Mrs. J.D. Osborne, they collected 800 donated books before plans for the library were even made. In 1902 and 1903, Mrs. D.E. Waggoner was appointed to represent Cleburne in New York to secure a grant from the Carnegie Foundation for the library. After many months, a grant of $20,000 was granted to build and furnish the library. The city was required to secure the land, match the fund, and levy a tax to maintain the library. A library board would be formed soon after. The architectural firm Smith and Moore was chosen to design the library. The library is considered the citie's first attempt at formal architectural expression.

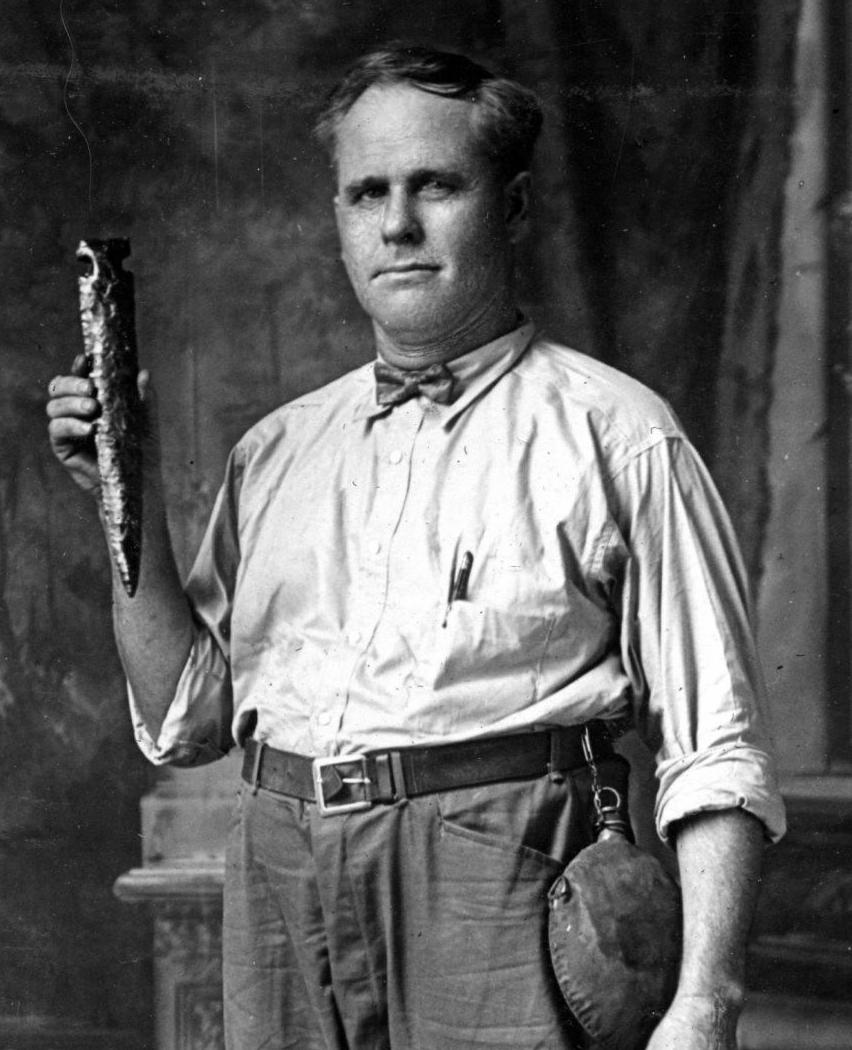
William J. Layland

The library opened in 1905 with 2,608 volumes, including a bookshelf full of works from contemporary authors donated by the Carnegie Foundation. A large collection of Shakespearean works and over 400 stereopticon slides were also added over time. The second floor housed an auditorium, where the Little Theatre Group, and Cleburne Shakespearean Club performed. In 1952, the library board was dissolved and the City of Cleburne assumed ownership. The Layland Museum would make its start on the second floor in 1963, with a donation of artifacts from William J. Layland. In 1978, the library would relocate to a new building to accommodate for growth. The museum would move downstairs while The Greater Cleburne Carnegie Players used the top floor for their shows. The collection would grow to include thousands of objects from hundreds of donors. In 2016, The Cleburne Railroad Museum, a sister museum, would open on the same block.

== Galleries ==
The museum offers several permanent exhibits with changing exhibits lasting one to three months. Some come from other institutions, while some are from private collectors and the museums own collection.

=== First peoples ===
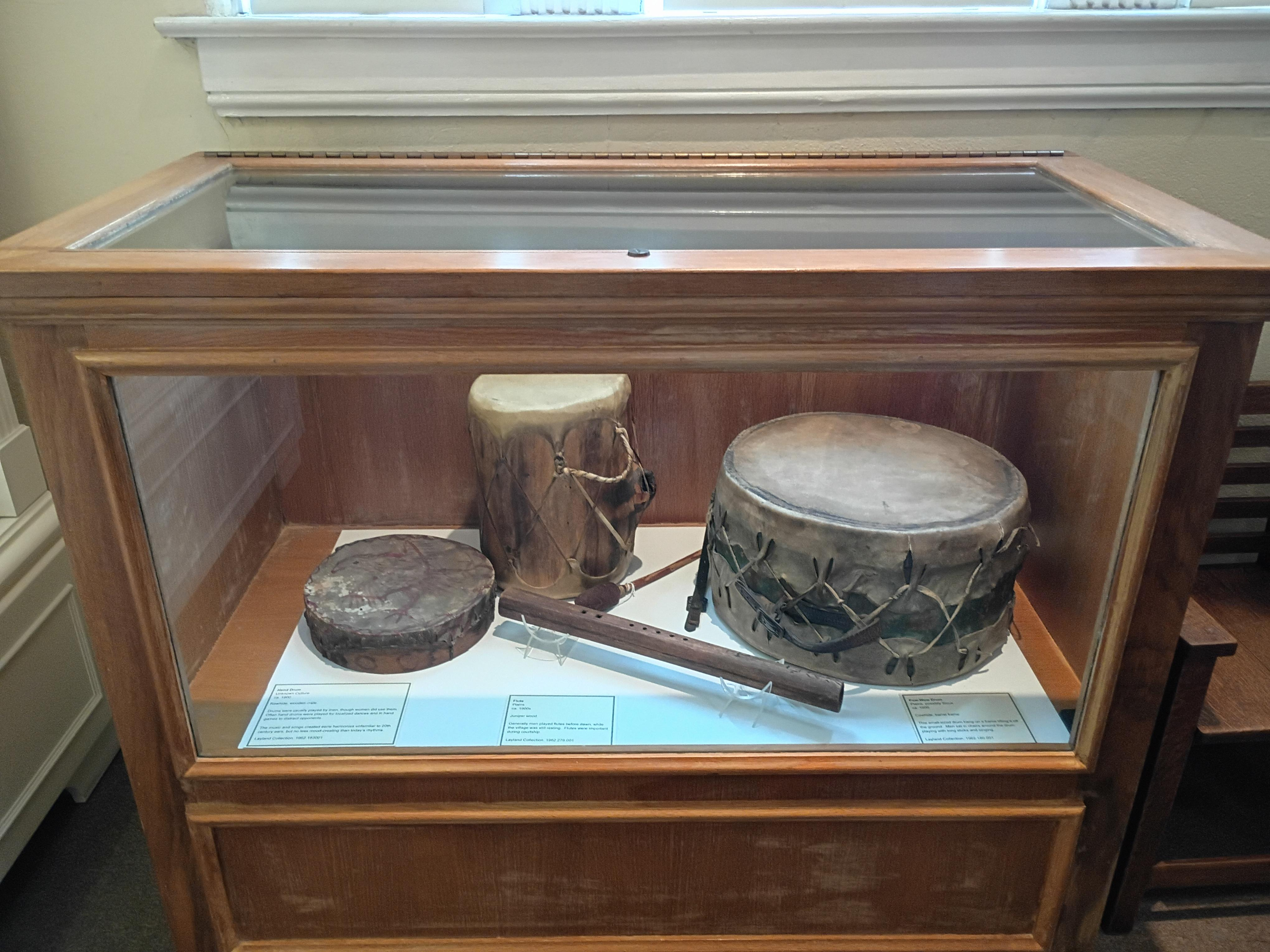
Native instruments

Native American culture features prominently, exploring 300 years of their livelihood in the region. Many of the artifacts on display are from William J. Layland's personal collection. Tribes that frequented the area include the Wichita, Comanche, Kiowa, Cherokee, and Alabama-Coushatta. The broader region was part of the "horse-and-gun" frontier, with French and English traders from the east providing guns for peltry, and Spanish traders providing horses.

=== Settlers ===
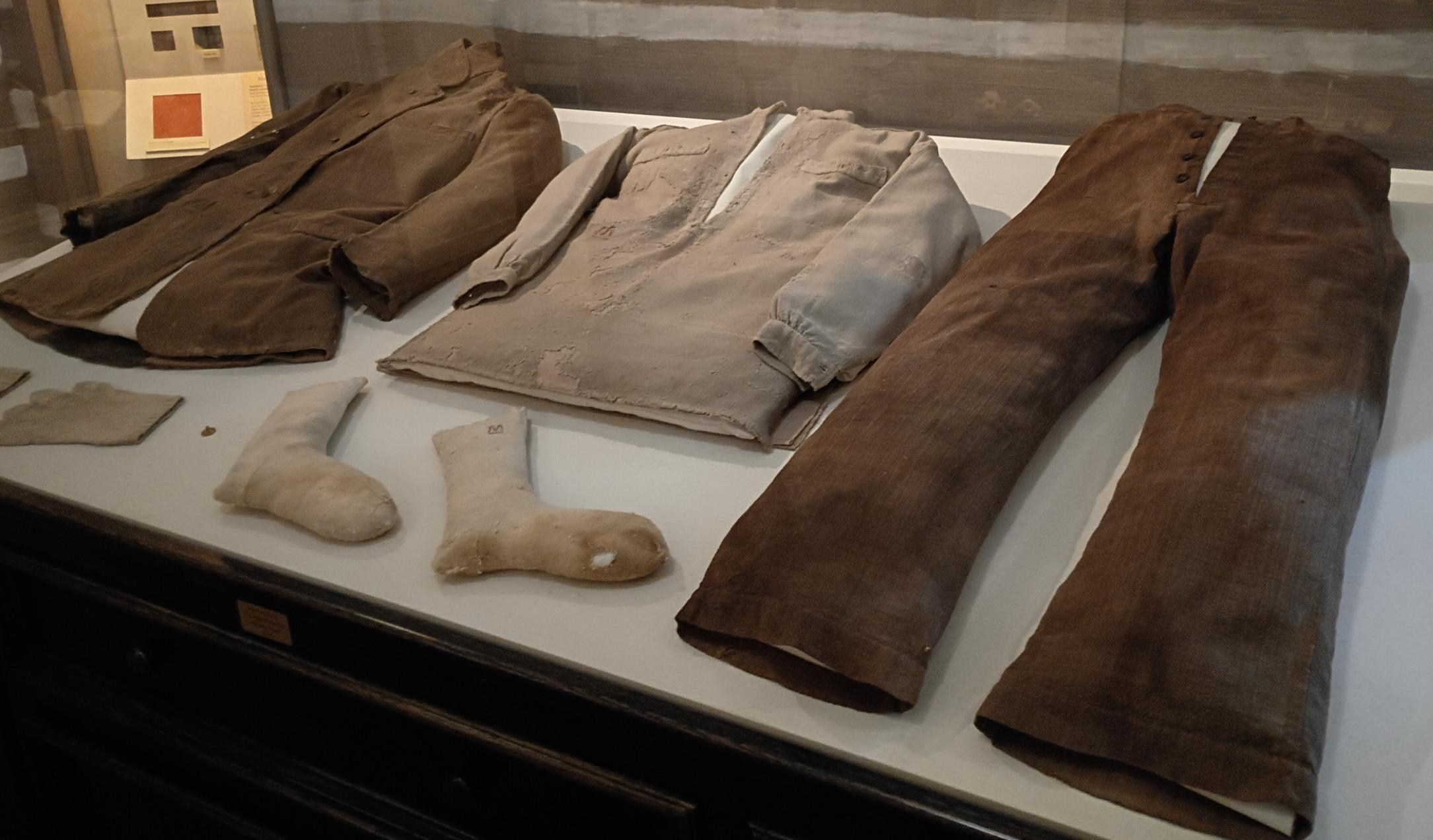
Confederate uniform

Life of those on the frontier between 1840 and 1900 are explored in several displays showcasing the setting up of a homestead and frontier farms. The library was built on the site of Camp Henderson, a military outpost around which the area's settlers would meet. one of the first settlers that moved to Cleburne proper was N.H. Cook, who opened a mercantile business that would soon be joined by people moving from Buchanan after its removal as county seat of Johnson County.

=== 20th century ===
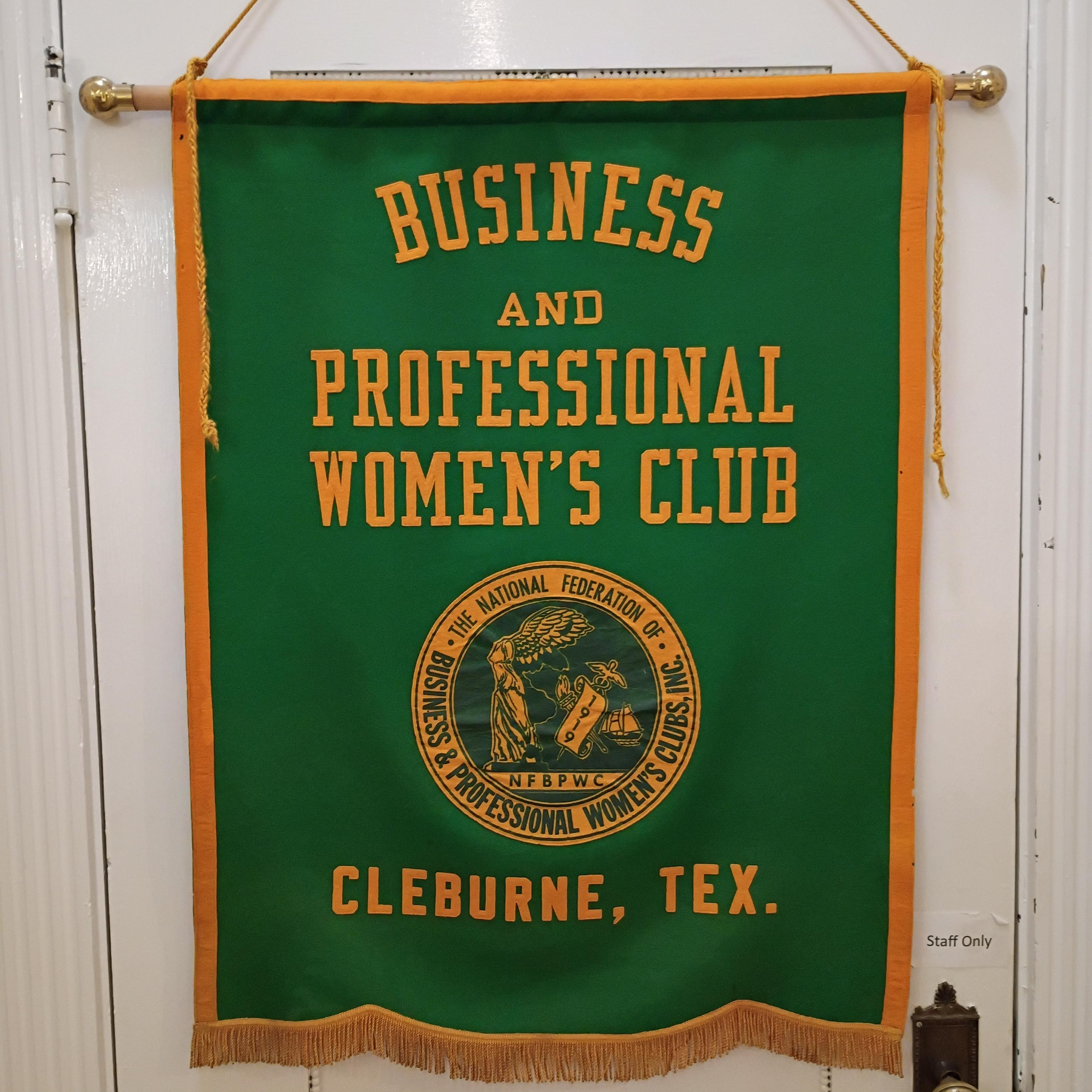
Women's Club banner

With many changes occurring during the turn of the century, aspects of furnishing, transportation, and global events are put into context of the urban lifestyle that developed in the 1900s. At the local level, the influence of the railroads would turn Cleburne into an industrial center. The labor movements of the time would culminate in a strike at the Santa Fe Shops. Programs to counter the Great Depression would see local projects be built in the area as well. Cleburne had a German prisoner of war camp during the later years of World War II. The library housed a war information center for the U.S. Information Service during World War II.

== Exterior and interior ==
=== Exterior ===
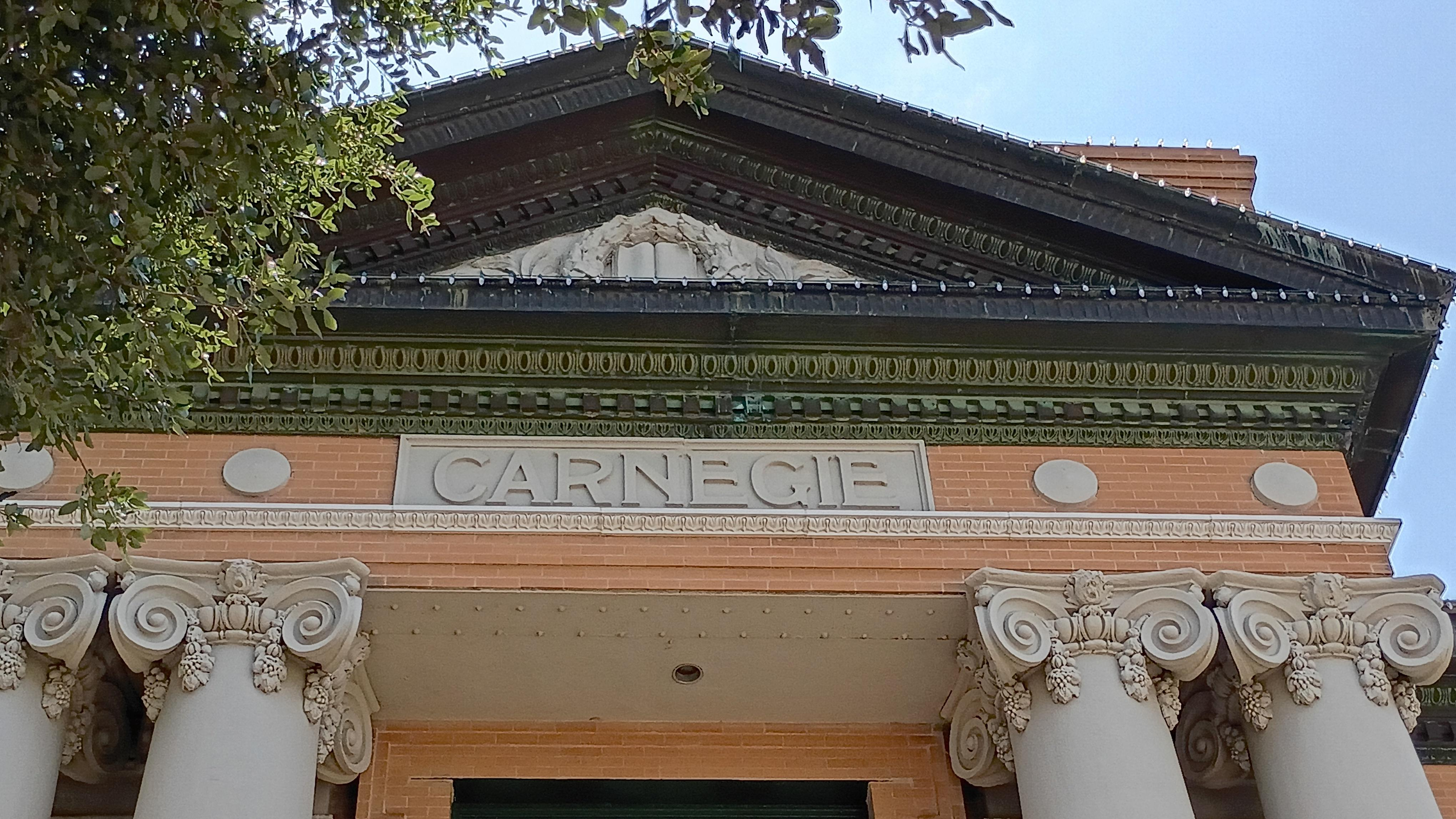
Pediment of the Carnegie Building

Built in the Classical Revival style, the building is a square two-story structure with a centrally placed entrance foyer on its eastern facade. The western facade consist of a broad but shallow apse. The entablature, pilasters, and columns contribute to the monumental visual effect of the building. The three-bay main facade consists of the centrally placed projecting entrance bay and flanking bays on each side. The entrance bay consists of a pedimented double doorway. The doorway is crowned by a multiple triangular pane lunette and is framed by a triumphal arch. The second floor level is articulated by a Doric entablature with tryglyphs and metopes ornamented with pateras.

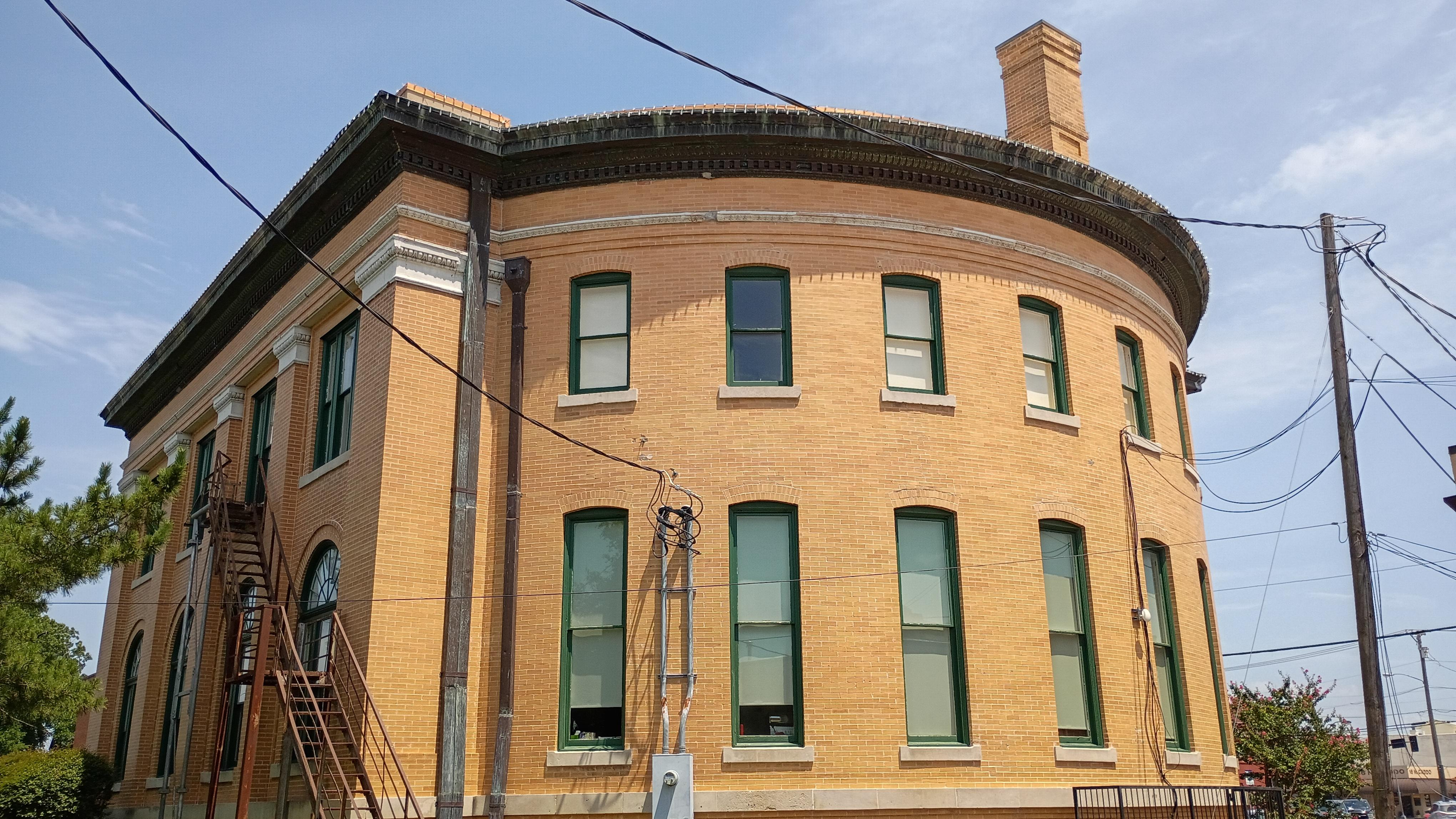
Apse of the Carnegie Building

The entrance is flanked by massive two-story paired columns, which are smooth and slightly tapered. They have composite capitals and are supported pedestals which project outward, beyond the columns. The two flanking bays, along with the sides and back apse, have windows on both floors separated by brick pilasters. The entrance bay is terminated with an elaborately ornamented pediment, formed of a pressed copper cornice. The entire structure rests on a brick plinth which is articulated by a stone water table which encircles and visually binds the structure on all four sides.

=== Interior ===
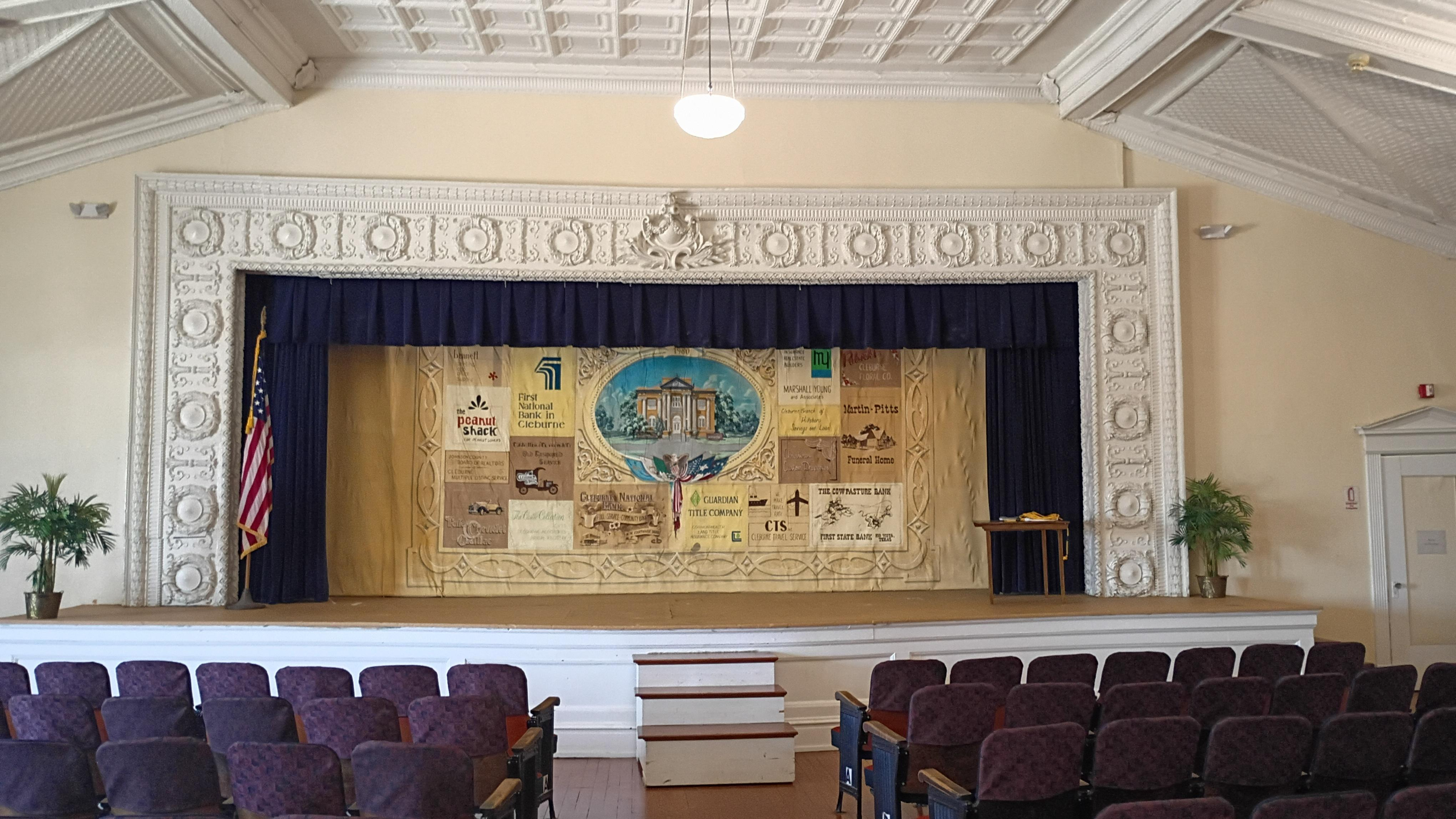
Second floor auditorium

The floor plan of the building is a single large space on each floor. On the ground floor, the centrally placed projecting foyer encroaches, slightly, on the interior main space. The foyer contains a half turn stair-case on its south side, and rest rooms on its north side. The interior space is richly ornamented with cast metal composite columns which support a grid of structural beams, concealed by Neo-Classical entablature. The second floor, with the centrally placed entrance foyer, was originally an auditorium, with a raised stage placed in the western apse. The stage has an elaborate rectangular proscenium arch with molded stucco ornament.

== Governance ==
The Museum Advisory Board is composed of volunteers who donate their time to advise and raise funds, museum exhibits, programs, and more. Museum staff include a manager, educator, and technician. Volunteer work includes research, education programs, working the reception desk, and collection projects. Internships are also offered on a semester basis, as well as annual memberships to help fund the museum.

== Objects from the collection ==
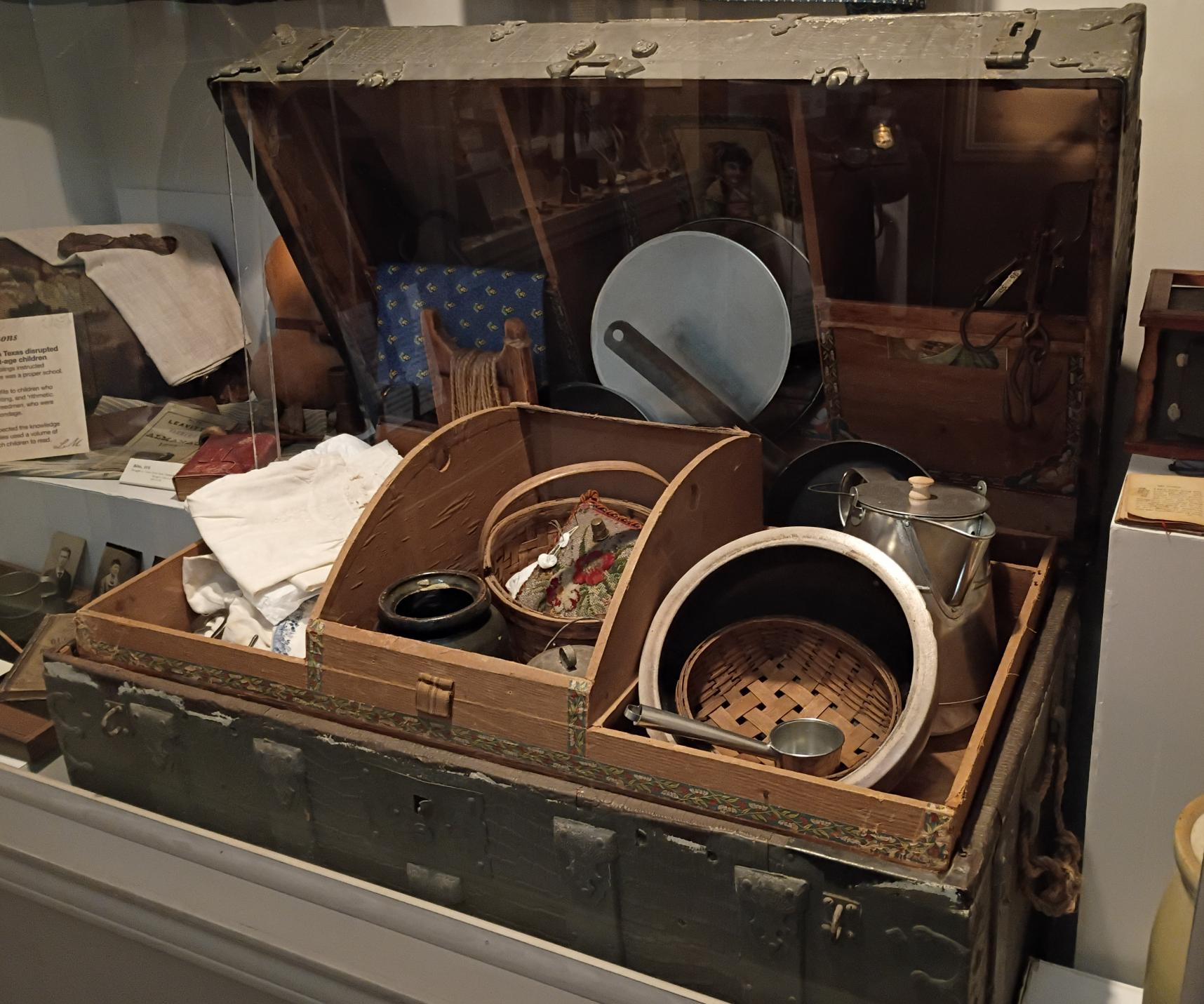
An example of a mothers travel pack from the mid-1800s

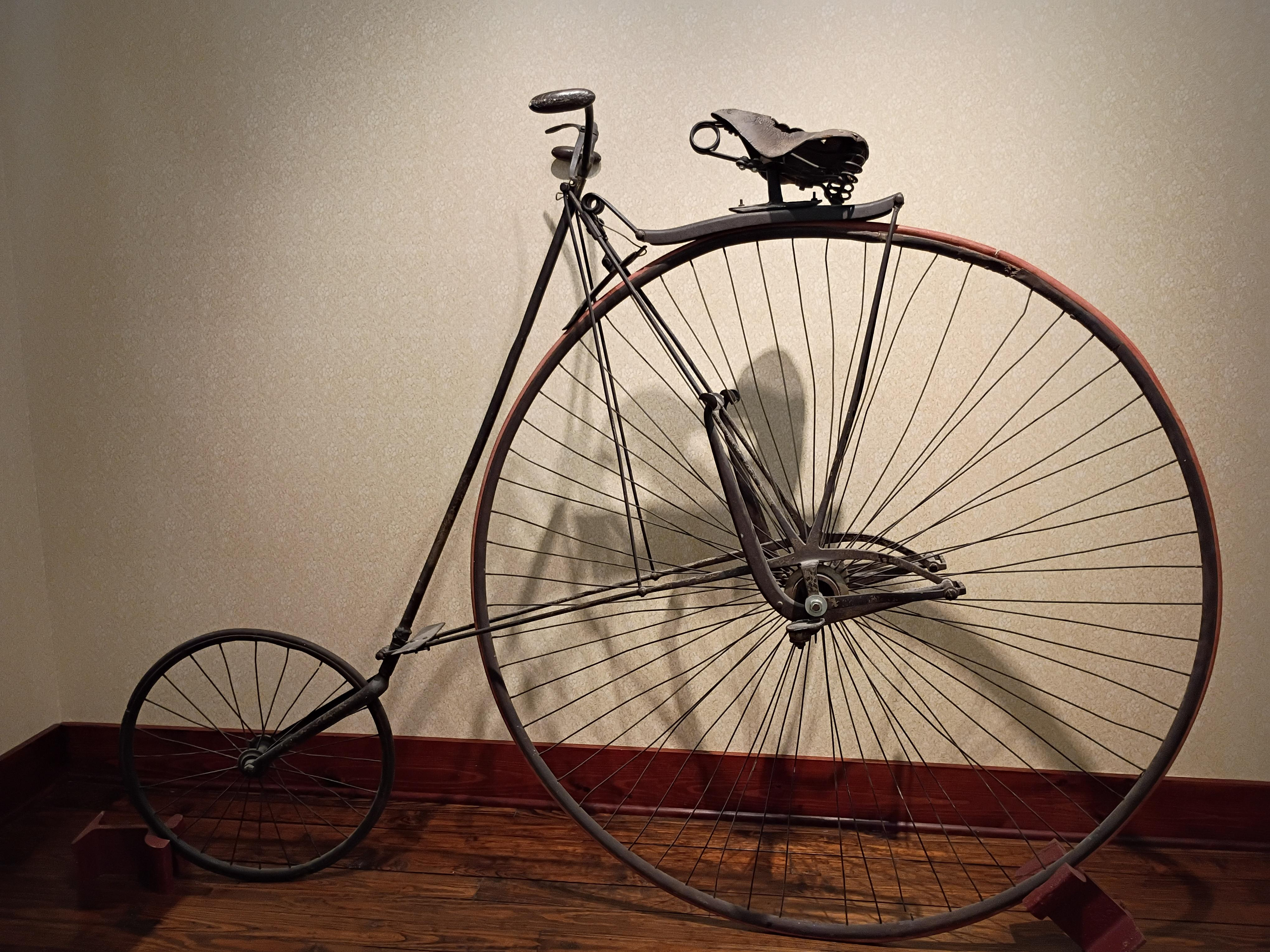
A Penny-Farthing Bicycle

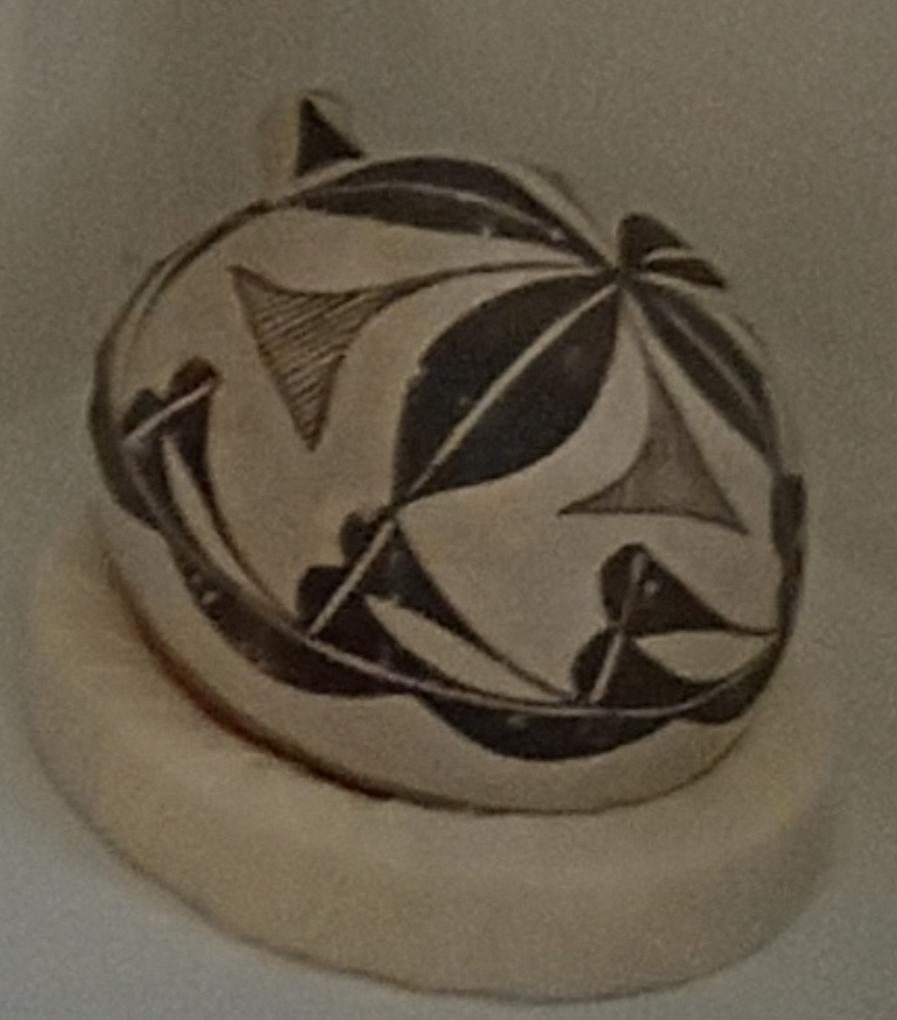
Black and white native pottery

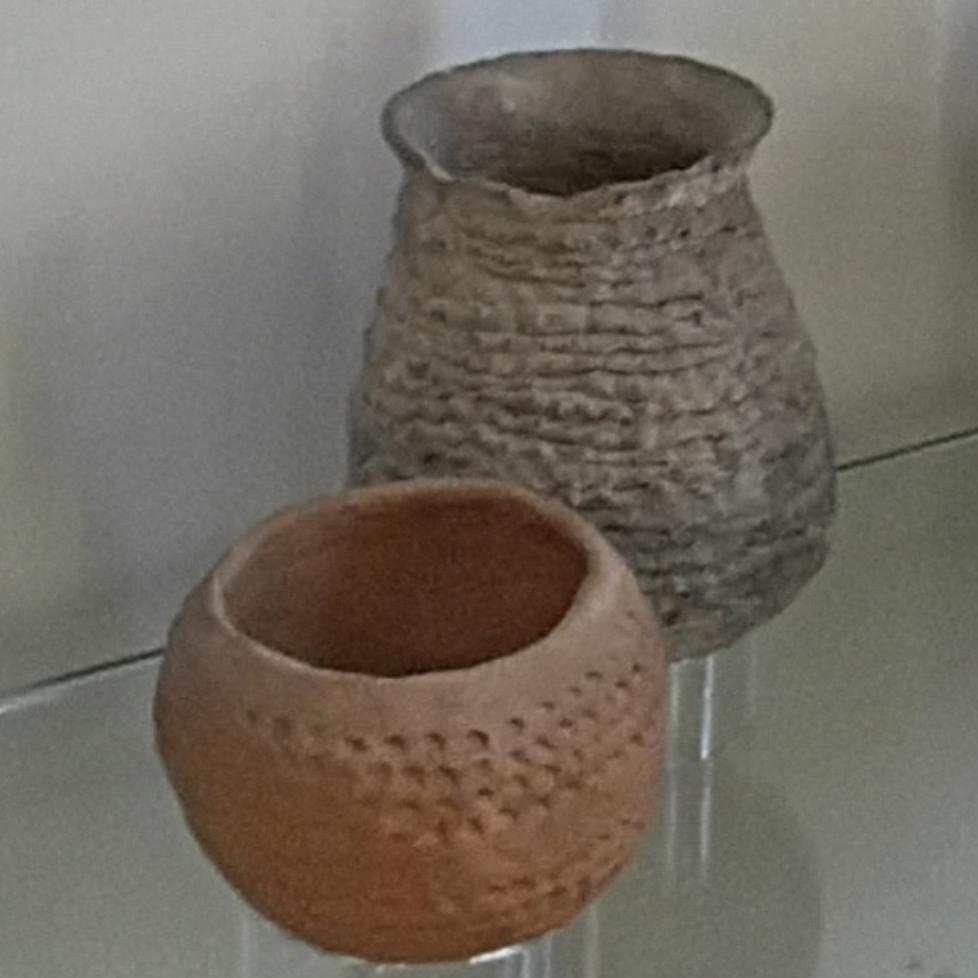
Native pottery

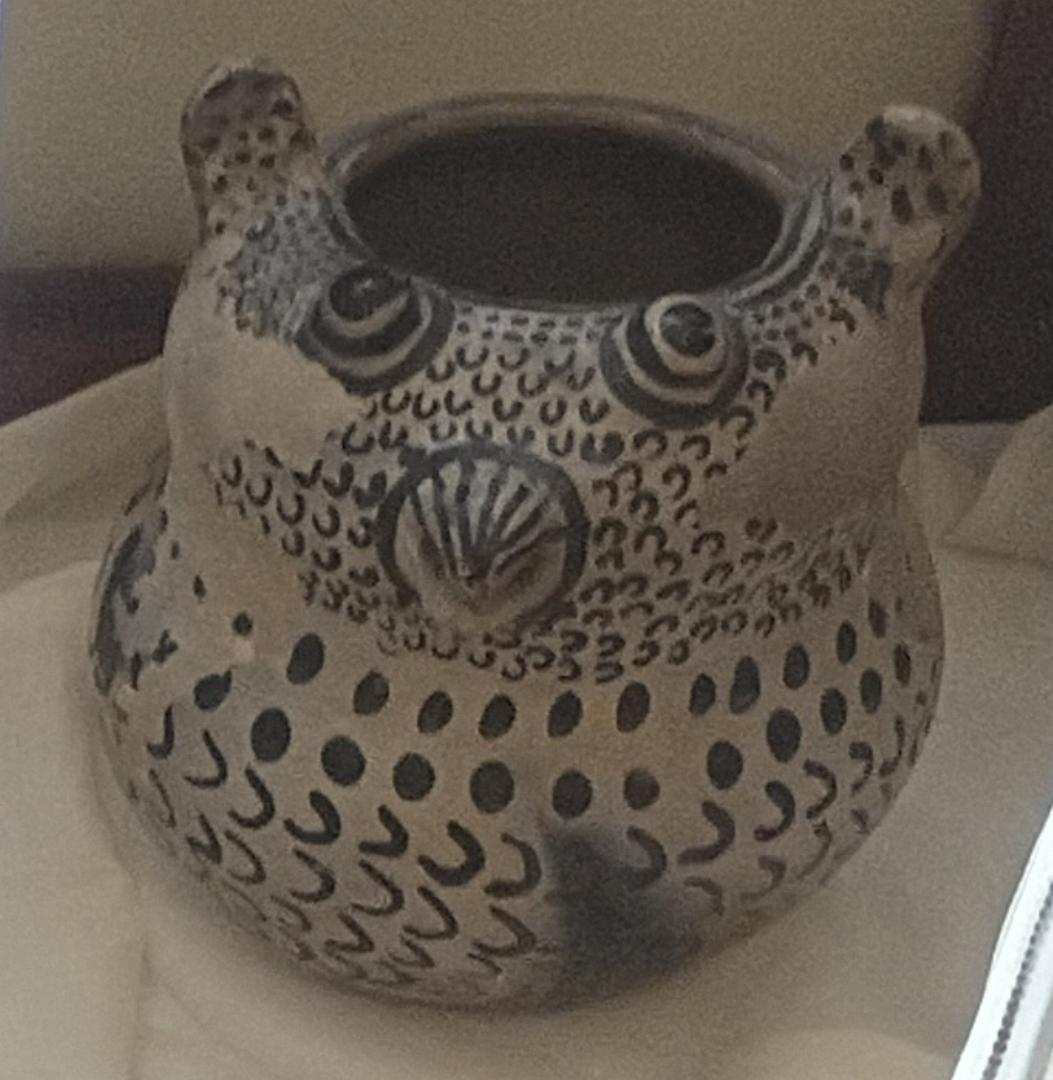
Ornate native pottery

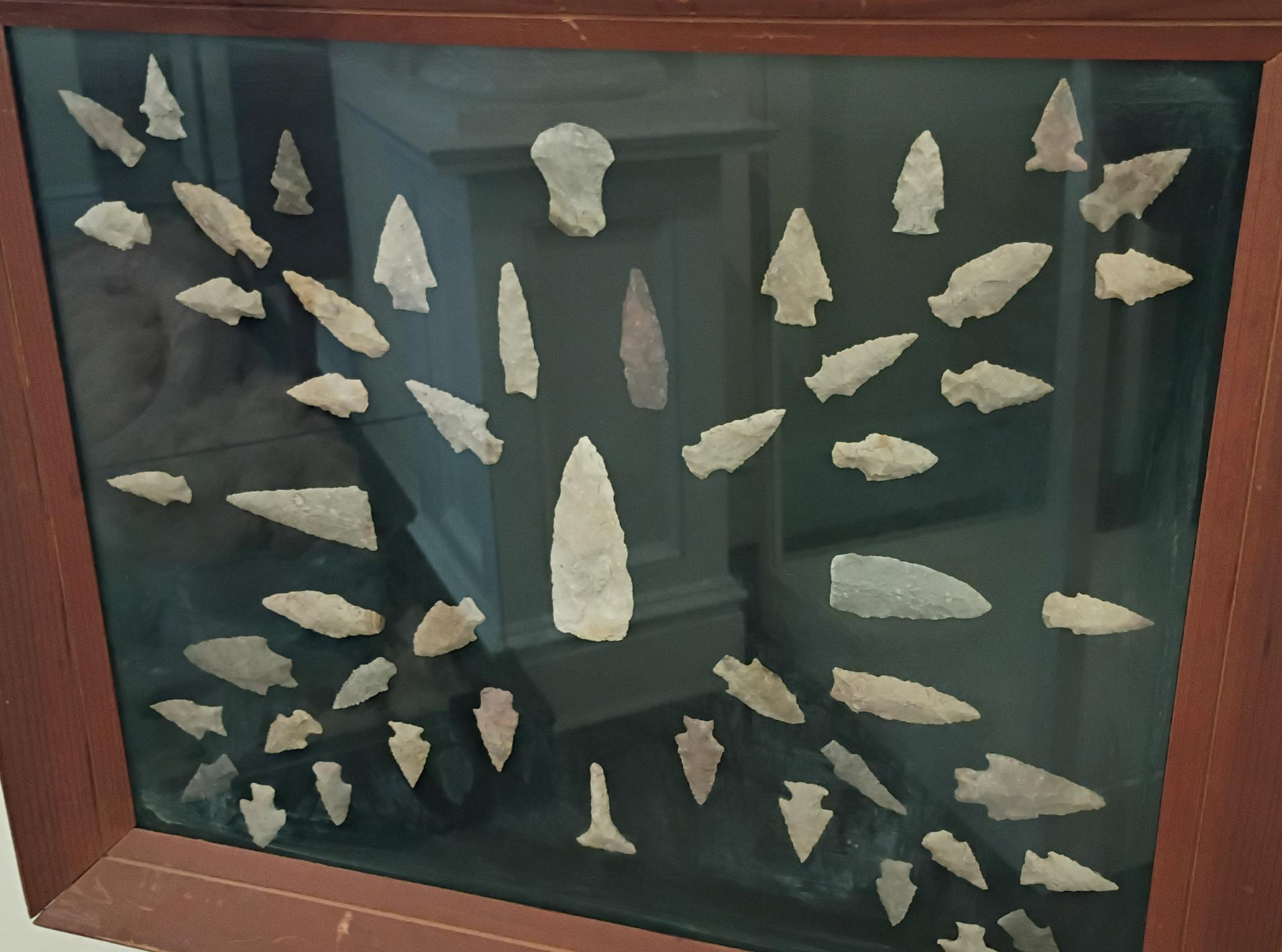
Arrowheads from Mustang Foundation

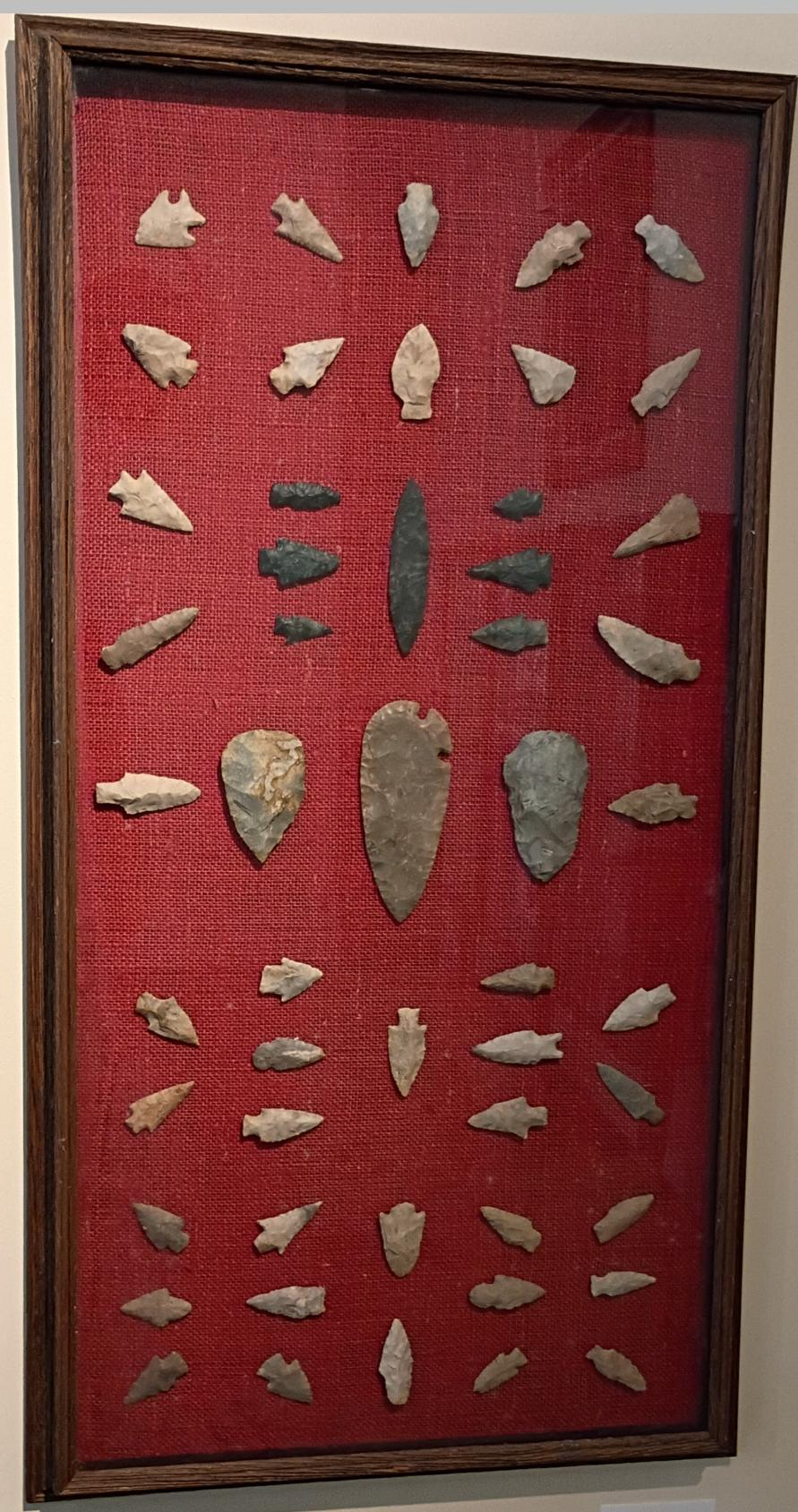
Arrowheads from Mustang Foundation

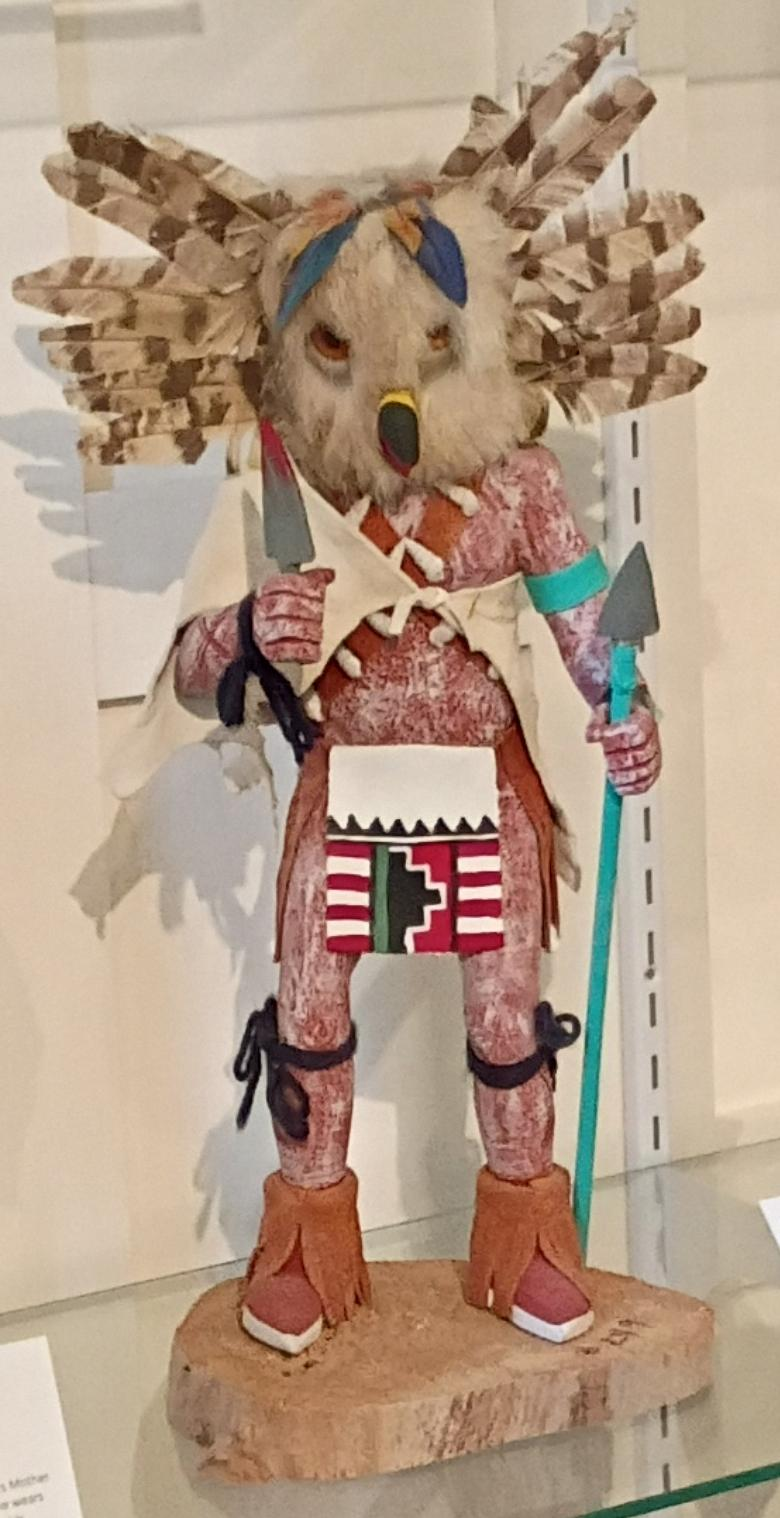
Great Horned Owl Kachina

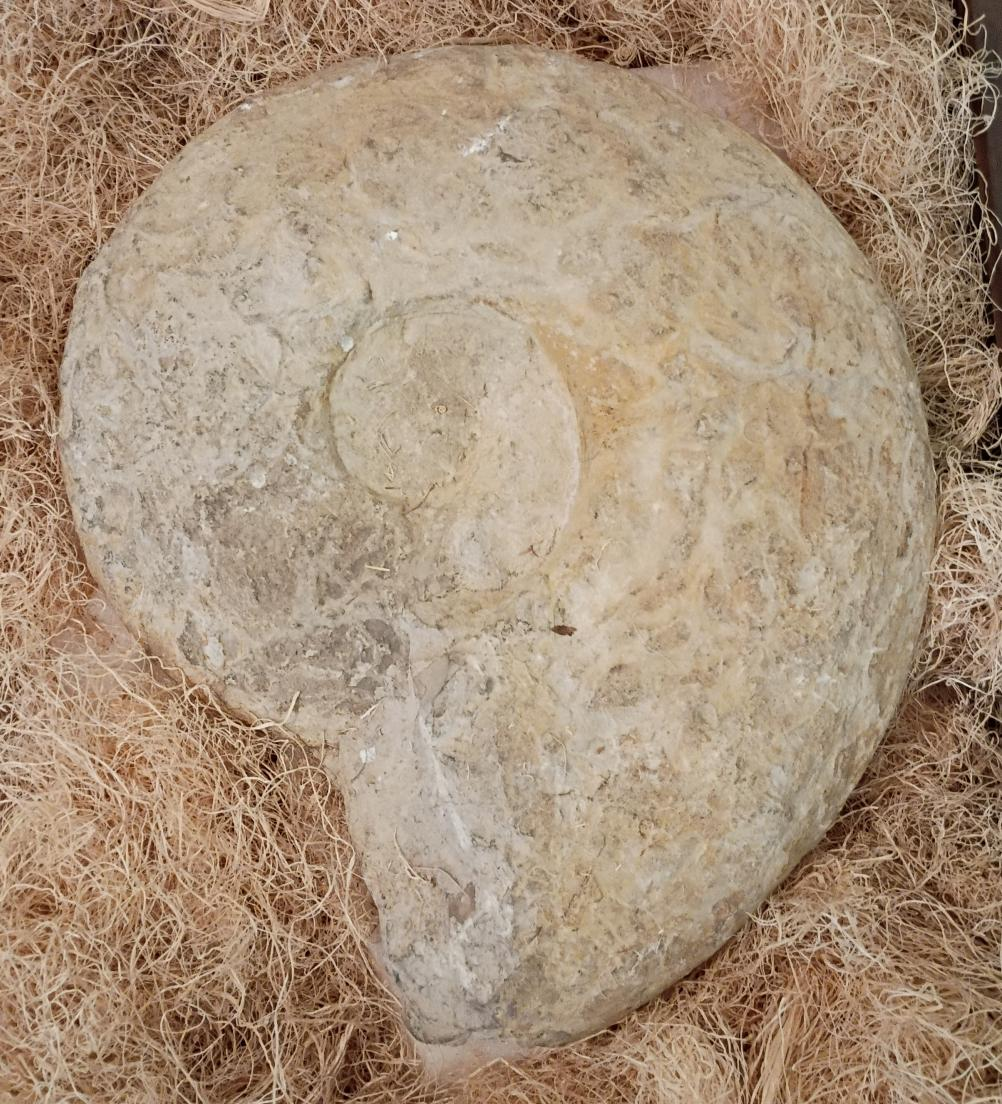
Large Ammonite

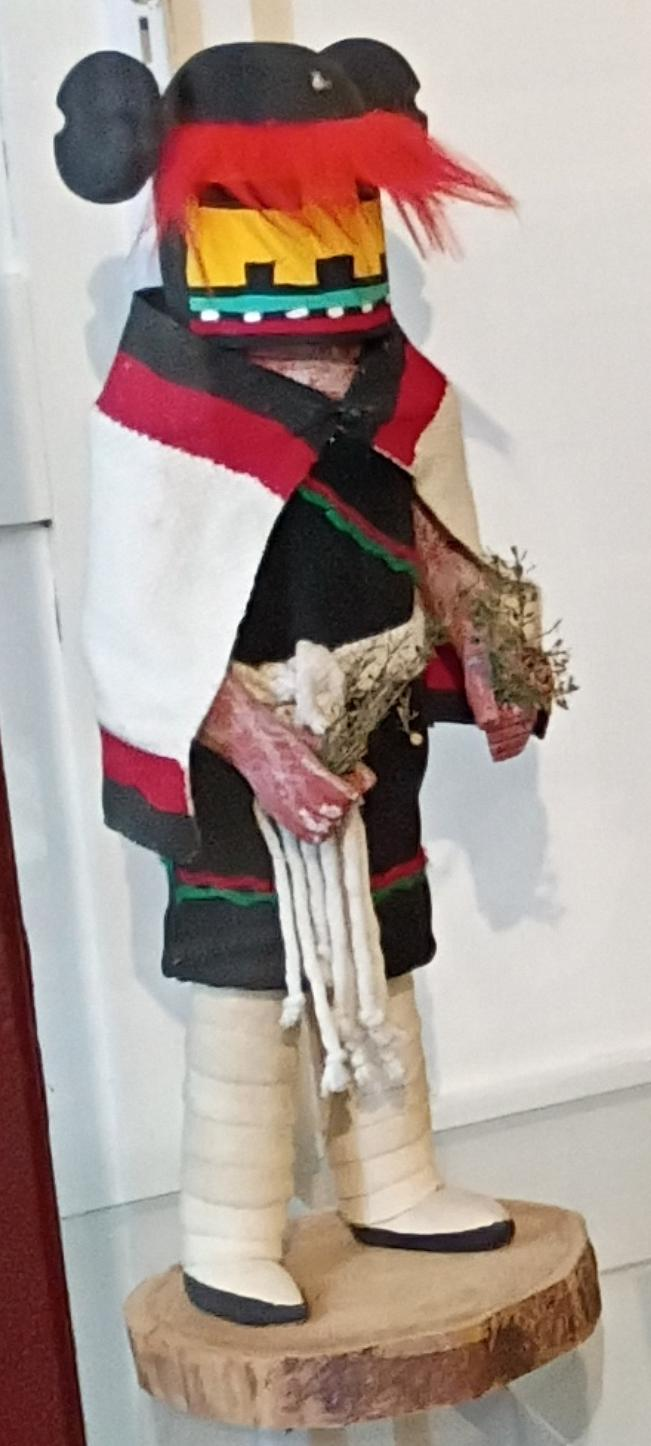
Kachin-Mana Corn Maiden Kachina

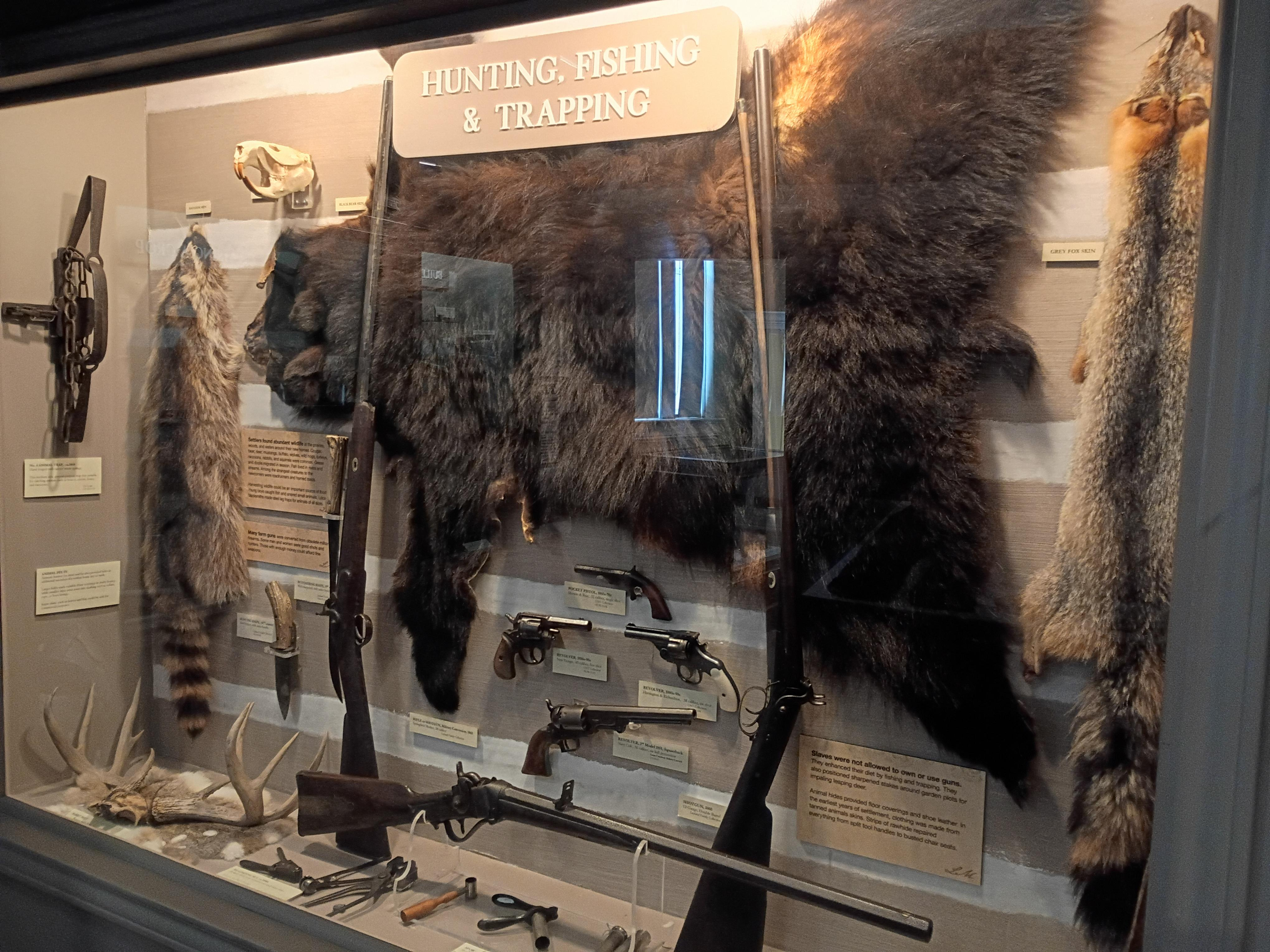
Hunting Display

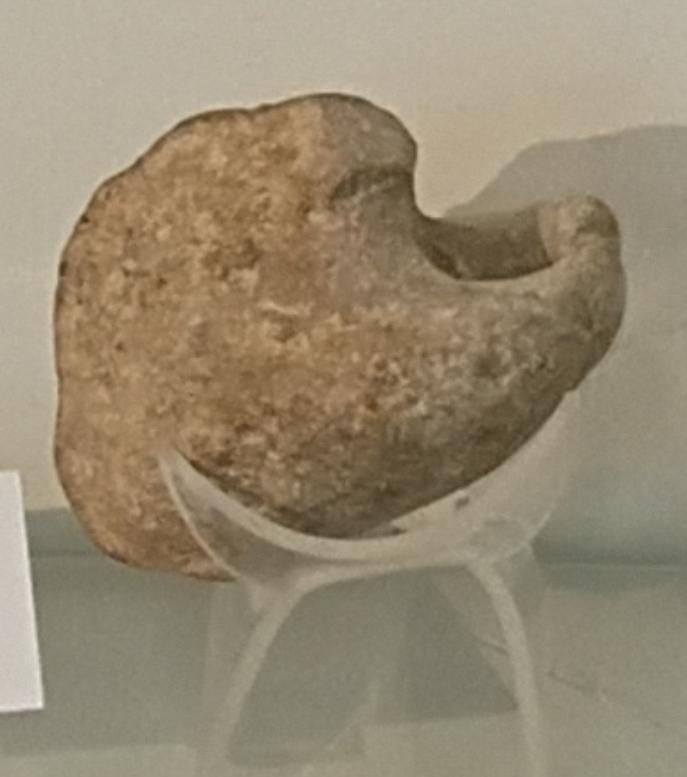
Hivalve Fossil

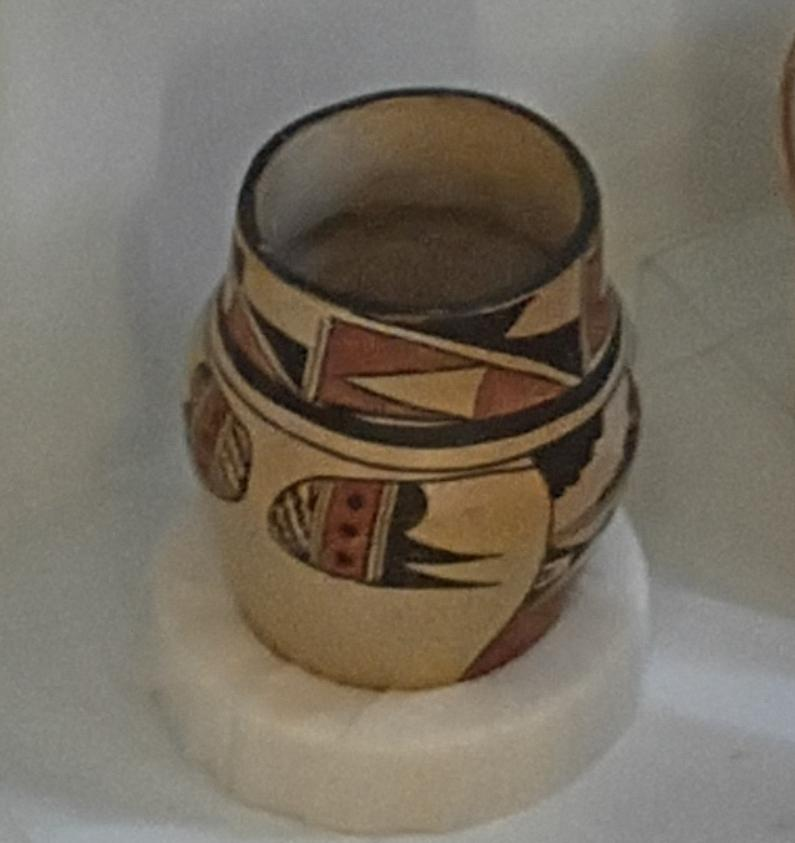
Native pottery

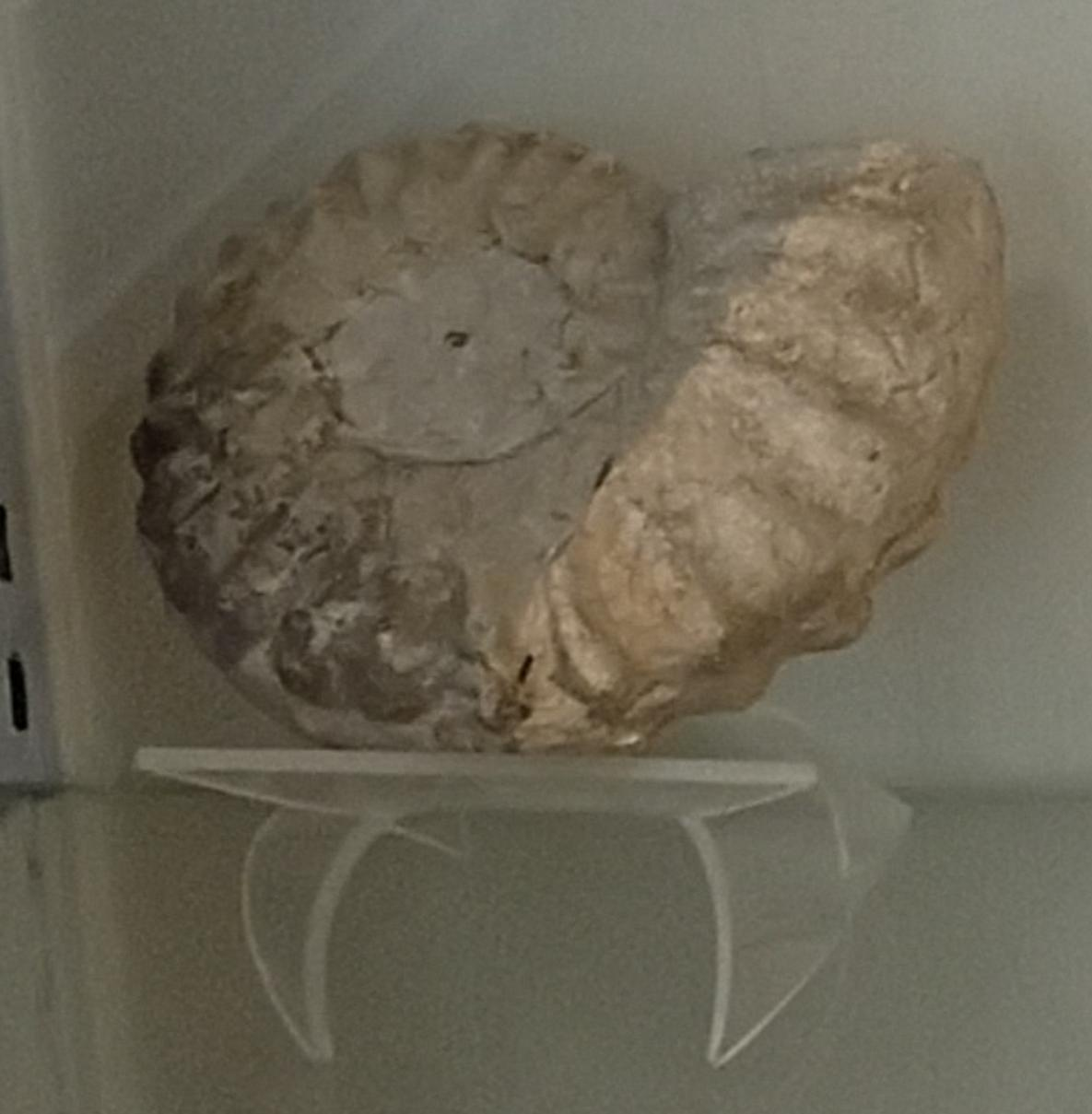
Small Ammonite

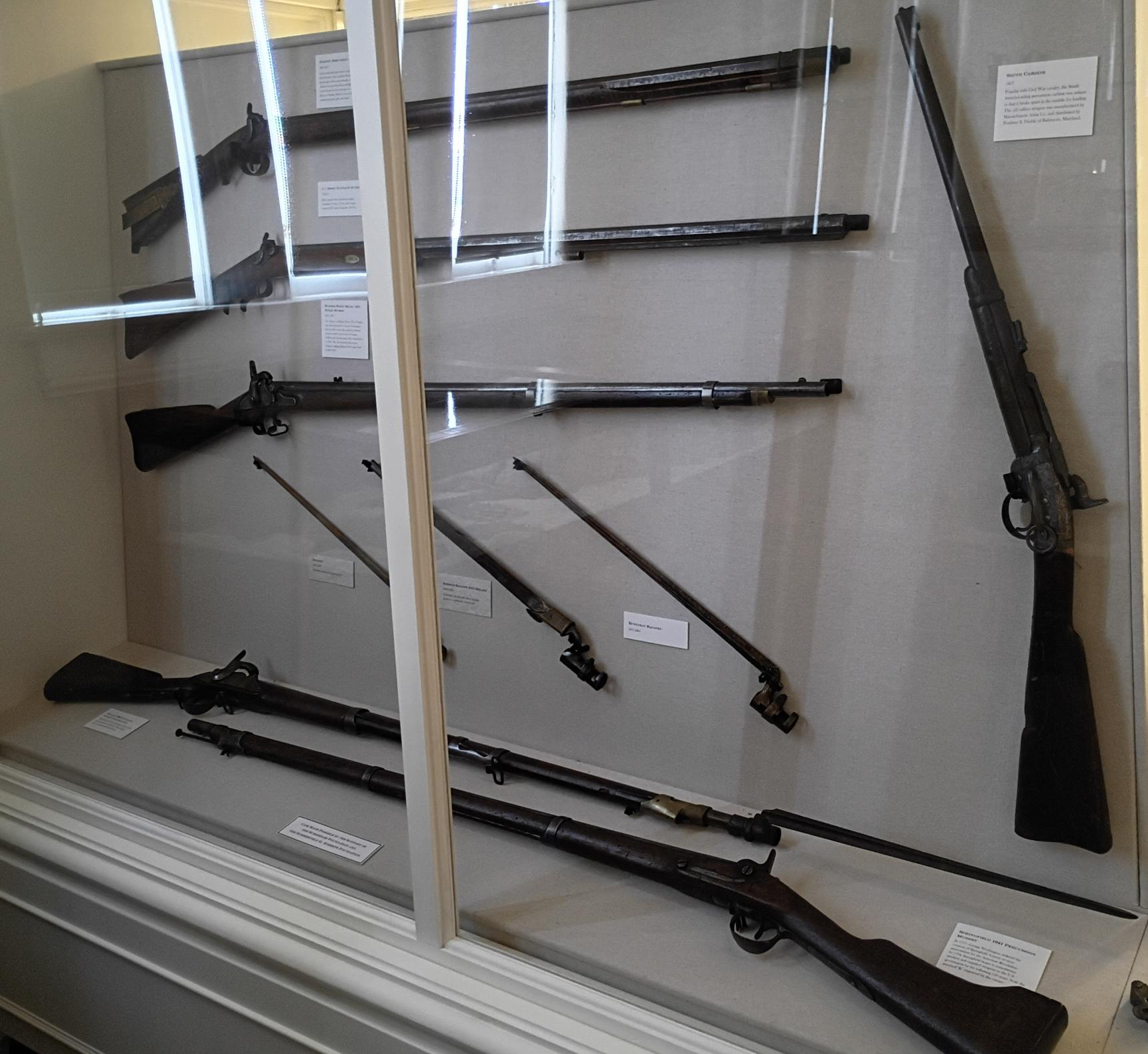
19th century muskets
