= The Greater Cleburne Carnegie Players =

The Greater Cleburne Carnegie Players, named for Andrew Carnegie, is a non-profit thespian group that has been bringing live theatre to Cleburne, Texas and the surrounding areas since 1980.

Starting with the first season, which included two shows, and continuing to the present with four shows performed annually, the Carnegie Players encourage participation both on the stage and off by anyone in the Johnson County area.

The theatre has produced many talented actors and actresses in its time, and is still continuing to remain a great theatre force in Cleburne, Texas.

== History ==
In 1978, the City of Cleburne moved their storage-house from the top floor theatre of the Carnegie Library building, which had been built by a grant to the city from the Andrew Carnegie Foundation in 1904.

This move opened the door for renovation of the theatre and the founding of a theatre troupe for the city. Thus, The Greater Cleburne Carnegie Players was founded. The renovation project involved many local citizens along with the city and took two years to completion.

Since 1980, all Fall, Winter, and Spring productions have been performed on The Layland Museum Theatre stage (located at 201 N. Caddo), whereas the summer musicals have been performed at Cleburne High School.

Beginning in the summer of 2010, the Carnegie Players moved into the Community Performing Arts Center located in the newly remodeled Cleburne Conference Center. The Carnegie Players' last production in the old Carnegie Theater was the musical 1776 in March 2010, while the first show in the new theatre was The Wizard of Oz in June 2010.

== Past productions ==
2020's

2022
12 Angry Jurors
Cheaper by the Dozen
And Then There Were None

2021
Christmas Belles
Dearly Beloved
Farce of Habit
Farce of Nature

2020
Come Blow Your Horn
Bright Star

2010's

2019
All I Really Need to Know I Learned in Kindergarten
Mamma Mia
A Piece of My Heart
Over the River and Through the Woods

2018
Rumor's
All Shook Up
The Foreigner
The Homecoming

2017
Agatha Christie's-And Then There Were None
Oklahoma
Arsenic And Old Lace
The Lion The Witch And The Wardrobe

2016
Greater Tuna
Into The Woods
Steel Magnolias
It's A Wonderful Life

2015
Lés Miserable
The Odd Couple
The Best Christmas Pageant Ever

2014
The Fantasticks
Titanic: The Musical
Pump Boys and Dinettes
T'was the Night before Christmas

2013
Over the River and through the Woods
Fiddler on the Roof
The Wedding from Hell
The Best Christmas Pageant Ever

2012
The Musical Comedy Murders of 1940
State Fair
Anne of Green Gables
Babes in Toyland

2011
Godspell
Father of the Bride
Miracle on 34th Street
To Kill a Mockingbird

2010
The Wizard of Oz
Romeo and Juliet
Dracula
It's a Wonderful Life

2000's

2009
Disney's Beauty and the Beast
A Midsummer Nights Dream
The Best Christmas Pageant Ever
1776

2008
Oliver
Agatha Christi's The Mousetrap
CS Lewis' The Lion the Witch and the Wardrobe
The Man Who Came to Dinner

2007
Man of La Mancha
A Christmas Story
Sunshine Boys
Joseph and the Amazing Technicolor Dreamcoat

2006
The Diviners
It's a Wonderful Life
The Music Man
The Foreigner

2005
The Miracle Worker
The Best Little Christmas Pageant Ever
Arsenic and Old Lace
South Pacific

2004
Little Women
The Lion, the Witch and the Wardrobe
All I Really Need to Know I Learned in Kindergarten
The Sound of Music

2003
Steel Magnolias
Miracle on 34th Street
Sylvia
Cinderella

2002
Fiddler on the Roof
Moon Over Buffalo
A Christmas Carol
Bus Stop

2001
Oliver
The Odd Couple (Female Version)
A Christmas Story
Cat On a Hot Tin Roof

2000
Guys and Dolls
Frosty the Snowman
The Rainmaker

1990's

1999
Joseph and the Amazing Technicolor Dreamcoat
It's A Wonderful Life
Nunsense II: the Second Coming

1998
The Unsinkable Molly Brown
Cheaper By The Dozen
To Gillian, On Her 37th Birthday

1997
The Wizard of Oz
The Best Christmas Pageant Ever
Wait Until Dark

1996
Paint Your Wagon
The Glass Menagerie
Driving Miss Daisy

1995
Li'l Abner
The Oldest Living Graduate (production canceled)
The Odd Couple

1994
Nunsense
Blithe Spirit
The Nerd

1993
Camelot
You're A Good Man Charlie Brown
1776

1992
Fiddler on the Roof
Rumors
Bexar

1991
The Foreigner
Oliver!
Steel Magnolias
Lend Me A Tenor

1990
My Fair Lady
The Sound of Music
The Fourposter
The Clock Shop

1980's

1989
On Borrowed Time
Annie
Harvey

1988
Cinderella
House of Blue Leaves
Carnival
Arsenic and Old Lace

1987
The Odd Couple (female version)
The Music Man
You Can't Take It With You

1986
Carnegie Players 10th Anniversary Gala
The King and I
Murder for the Asking
Alice in Wonderland

1985
Deathtrap
Annie Get Your Gun
Lu Ann Hampton Laverty Oberlander

1984
Plaza Suite
South Pacific
The Diviners
My Three Angels

1983
The Rainmaker
Oklahoma
Bus Stop
The Homecoming

1982
Barefoot in the Park
The Nutcracker
Inherent Legacy

1981
The Sound of Music
A Christmas Carol

1980
Come Blow Your Horn
The Little Angel Who Was Always Late
