= Gordon Wood (American football) =

American football player and coach (1914–2003)

Biographical details
- Born: May 25, 1914; Abilene, Texas, US
- Died: December 17, 2003 (aged 89); Abilene, Texas, US

Playing career
- 1935–1937: Hardin–Simmons

Coaching career (HC unless noted)
- 1938–1939: Spur HS (TX) (assistant)
- 1940–1941: Rule HS (TX)
- 1945–1946: Roscoe HS (TX)
- 1947–1949: Seminole HS (TX)
- 1950: Winters HS (TX)
- 1951–1957: Stamford HS (TX)
- 1958–1959: Victoria HS (TX)
- 1960–1985: Brownwood HS (TX)

Head coaching record
- Overall: 396–91–15

Gordon Lenear Wood (May 25, 1914 – December 17, 2003) was an American high school football coach in Texas. He was a head football coach for forty-three seasons, winning or sharing twenty-five district championships and nine state championships.

Wood mainly ran a variant of the single wing formation, called "Warren Woodson Wing T", named after the former Hardin–Simmons coach whom Wood admired. Though it was primarily a running offense, Wood was ahead of his time because his teams could also pass effectively from it.

== Early life ==
Wood was the fourth son and the youngest of eight children. He grew up in West Texas, mostly in and around Abilene spending most of his childhood picking cotton to help support his family. He decided not to be a cotton farmer at the age of twelve when his family's crops failed and his father moved him to other farms in West Texas and New Mexico to pick and pull cotton. Wood stayed on those farms from late summer until November and didn't start school until December. His father never appreciated education, so Wood didn't start school until he was seven years old. Because his family moved around so much, Wood attended several different schools in and around Abilene before he graduated from Wylie High School in 1934.

Wood was active in sports throughout his education and got his first taste of competition when he played basketball in the sixth grade. In seventh grade, Wood played in the first football game he had ever seen. He misinterpreted the "fight" chants at the pep rally, and during the game, he spent most of his time beating up the opponent he was supposed to block. In tenth grade, Wood transferred to Abilene High School because the Wylie school did not suit out a football team. He played football for eight weeks before he succumbed to pressure from his father, who didn't think his son should be wasting time on sports and school, and transferred back to Wylie High School. At Wylie, Wood continued to play basketball and run track. He was an excellent athlete and a starter in both sports.

In 1934, Wood was the third fastest runner in Taylor County and was scouted by coach Leslie "Fats" Cranfill from Hardin–Simmons University, who offered Wood a partial athletic scholarship to Hardin–Simmons. After some convincing, Wood's father gave him his blessing and set his son up living with a friend in Abilene. Eventually, Wood earned a full scholarship, and the University provided him with room and board. At Hardin–Simmons, Wood played football and basketball, ran track, and boxed in order to maintain his scholarship. Despite nearly flunking out his first semester, Wood did well in college. He was never a star athlete at the university, but he did learn a lot about sports and coaching. It was at Hardin–Simmons that Wood decided he wanted to be a coach.

== Spur and Rule high schools ==
After he graduated from Hardin–Simmons in 1938, Wood received his first coaching job as an assistant at Spur High School. He was the assistant coach for football and head coach for track and basketball under head coach, Blackie Wadzeck. Coach Wood coached at Spur for two years when Coach Wadzeck, was promoted to high school principal. Originally the school board offered Wood the head coaching position, but rescinded their offer when they thought a better candidate came into the picture.

Coach Wood found his first head coaching position at Rule High School in 1940. Rule was already in the midst of a nineteen-game losing streak when Wood took over, and he had a hard time improving their record. He lost the three opening games of the season extending the streak to twenty-two before he earned his first win as a head coach. Rule ended the season with only two wins and eight losses. The next year Wood won the opening game over his old coaching grounds at Spur, but finished the season with only three wins, three losses, and two ties. After two years, Coach Wood finished his first head-coaching job at Rule with a record of five wins, eleven losses, and two ties. Wood was looking forward to a better third season at Rule, but after the attack on Pearl Harbor in December 1941, he resigned from his position at Rule and enlisted in the Navy.

== Navy ==
Wood initially washed out of the Navy Officer's Candidacy School, but the Navy realized he had training skills, and Wood was made into a chief petty officer. He trained new recruits and traveled around the nation escorting men to training facilities. Wood was able to coach while in the Navy. In 1942, while he was waiting to be called up for duty, the Abilene school district hired Coach Wood on a day-to-day basis, and he was able to coach spring training for seventh and eighth graders. The following fall, while on furlough for a few weeks, Wood was asked to fill in as head football coach at Haskell High School where he is credited with one win. Wood also coached basketball in the Navy using new recruits to form teams. He would often convince men to play for him as they rolled in for training.

It was in the Navy that Wood met his wife Katharine. He was spending a night out in San Diego when the two met. Gordon and Katharine courted for two months before they married in January 1945. A few weeks later they were expecting their first child. Their daughter, Patricia Wood, was born in September 1945, just days before Gordon Wood received his discharge.

== Roscoe, Seminole, and Winters ==
Because he was a schoolteacher before the war, the Navy allowed Wood to discharge early when he found a job as the principal at Roscoe, Texas High School. At Roscoe, Wood taught three math courses, drove the school bus, and coached football, basketball, and track. While coaching at Roscoe, Coach Wood started using his legendary winged-T offensive formation for the football team. In his first year coaching at Roscoe, Wood took his team through an undefeated season and won the district championship only to lose the first game in the state playoffs. The next year, Roscoe lost the opening game of the season, but it was two ties in district play that cost them the district title and kept them out of the 1946 playoffs. Coach Wood ended his career at Roscoe with sixteen wins, two losses, and two ties.

In 1947, Coach Wood followed Roscoe's superintendent to become Seminole, Texas High School's head coach. Seminole offered better pay, a larger high school, and a less stressful job. Coach Wood was no longer a principal, had no math courses to teach, and was helped by three assistants. It was at Seminole that Coach Wood first hired Morris Southall to be his assistant coach. The two became lifelong friends and coached together for thirty-one years. In 1947, Seminole won the district championship with nine wins and one loss but lost the first game of the state playoffs. The next season the football team went 6–3–1, followed by a 4–4–2 season in 1949. After the 1949 season, Coach Wood resigned as head coach, leaving Seminole with nineteen wins, nine losses, and three ties. Coach Southall took over as head coach at Seminole, while Coach Wood moved on to Winters High School. At Winters, Coach Wood's football team went 6–4 in 1950, but the poor condition of the gym and neglect from the school board caused him to resign after only one season.

== Stamford ==
Coach Wood found his next coaching job at Stamford, Texas High School. His first season in 1951, the Stamford Bulldogs won nine games, but one loss to district rival Anson kept them out of the district championship and the state playoffs. The next year, Stamford went undefeated in the regular season followed by Coach Wood's first ever playoff win. Stamford won two playoff games before losing to Terrell in the state semifinals. Coach Wood ended the 1952 season with thirteen wins and one loss. In 1953, Coach Wood took Stamford through another undefeated season, this time losing to Phillips in the state quarterfinals, and ending the 1953 season with eleven wins and one loss. In 1954, Wood had another winning season when Stamford won nine games, but a loss to Colorado City kept them out of the district championship and the state playoffs. That loss would be the last Coach Wood or Stamford would see for the next couple of years.

In 1955, Coach Wood brought Stamford to yet another undefeated season followed by playoff victories. This time Stamford went undefeated in the playoffs ending their season with a 34 to 7 victory over Hillsboro to claim the state championship. The Stamford Bulldogs went undefeated again in 1956, earning Coach Wood back-to-back state championships and extending the team's winning streak to 32 games. The 1957 season started well when three opening victories brought the streak up to 35, but Sweetwater ended Stamford's long years of success with a 24 to 7 victory over the Bulldogs. A second loss to the Seymour Panthers shut out Stamford's hopes for another district title and another shot at the state crown. The next year Coach Wood moved on to Victoria, while Stamford claimed another set of back-to-back championships in 1958 and 1959. Wood ended his career at Stamford with eighty wins and six losses, a 93% winning record.

== Victoria ==
In 1958, a much better paying job enticed Wood to leave West Texas for the first time as a head coach. He landed in Victoria, Texas, where he reunited with Assistant Coach Morris Southall. That year, Wood also hired Kenneth West as an assistant coach. West had played for Wood at Stamford in 1951. The two grew to be longtime friends and coached together for twenty years. Their first season at Victoria, Wood, Southall, and West shocked many Victoria fans and brought the team a 6–4 winning season. Then Coach Wood brought Victoria another winning season in 1959 with six wins, three losses, and one tie. Wood was getting paid well in Victoria, making about $10,000, but a lack of fan support and homesickness for West Texas convinced him to move back west. He left Victoria with twelve wins, seven losses, and one tie.

The job he really wanted was San Angelo Central, which had just opened after Bob Harrell resigned. However, it eventually went to Emory Bellard, so Wood had to settle for Brownwood.

Before they left Victoria, the Wood family decided to add another member. In 1959, Gordon and Katharine decided to adopt a baby. They had been trying for years to have a second child, and while in Victoria, a friend convinced them to adopt. They adopted a newborn baby boy into their family in 1959 and named him Jim Wood.

== Brownwood ==
Coach Wood found his last head coaching position at Brownwood, Texas High School in 1960. Coach Southall followed Wood to Brownwood, and the two finished their careers together with the Lions. A few years later, Coach West would also reunite with Coaches Wood and Southall. West coached for Coach Wood until being promoted to an assistant principal in 1984.

The Brownwood Lions had long been on the losing side of the football field, only winning one district championship between 1920 and 1959. 1960 was Coach Wood's first year in Brownwood and he brought the team a 13–1 season. Temple was the only loss the Lions received that year and Brownwood easily claimed the district title for the first time in many years. The Lions went undefeated in the playoffs and won their first state championship, beating Port Lavaca Calhoun 26 to 6 for the state crown.

In 1961, Terry Southall, the first of Coach Southall's three sons, suited out for the Brownwood varsity squad. Coach Wood's team won eight games that season with one loss in non-district play, but a tie with Breckenridge also meant a tie for the district title. Breckenridge advanced to the state playoffs on penetrations, while the Lions turned in their gear. In 1962, Brownwood went undefeated in the regular season with Terry Southall leading the way at quarterback. The Lions scored one playoff victory before losing to Dumas 36–18 in the state quarterfinals and ending the season with eleven wins and one loss. 1963 produced a winning season for Brownwood, but two losses to Stephenville and Wichita Falls Rider kept them out of the state finals. The Lions ended the season with eight wins and two losses. 1964 was also a winning season, but seven wins wasn't enough that year. A tie with Graham and two losses to Cleburne and Wichita Falls Hirschi left Brownwood players sitting at home for another playoff series.

In 1965, Coach Wood picked up a tip from Coach Pete Elliot and converted his Lions' defense to Elliot's "Illinois Defense". The change paid off well, and Brownwood was six games into the season before another team scored. Coach Wood's team won fourteen games to claim the district title and their second state championship without a loss on their record. Si Southall, Coach Southall's second son, joined the Lions' varsity squad the following season in 1966. Southall led the team at quarterback to eight victories, but losses to Abilene Cooper and Vernon cost Brownwood another shot at the playoffs. 1967 proved to be a better year. Brownwood suffered their first loss to Abilene Cooper and tied Wichita Falls Hirschi 21 to 21, but with Si Southall and thirteen returning lettermen leading the way, Brownwood captured twelve more wins and their third state championship before they turned in their gear in December.

The 1968 Brownwood Lions opened the season with a loss to Abilene Cooper followed by a win over Fort Worth Trimble Tech and a second loss to Wichita Falls Washington. Brownwood went undefeated in district play and faced Washington again in the district championship game. This time Coach Wood's Lions defeated the Leopards to secure another district title, but Brownwood lost the first game of the playoffs to Lubbock Estacado 49–0, ending their season with nine wins and three losses. 1969 was Coach Wood's tenth season at Brownwood, and he brought the Lions another winning season. Early losses to Abilene Cooper, Woodrow Wilson, and Abilene nearly stopped the Lions, but Coach Wood led the team to an undefeated district season and another district title. Brownwood capped off the season with a 21 to 12 victory over Bonham for Brownwood's fourth state title in Coach Wood's ten-year tenure.

The third Southall son, Shae, joined the squad in 1970, and Coach Wood was able to bring him and the other Lions to another winning season. After losing the opening game to Abilene Cooper, Brownwood claimed victories over twelve opponents and won another district title. A tie to Monahans nearly cut Brownwood's playoff tour short, but Brownwood advanced on penetrations and defeated Cuero 14 to 0 to claim the Lions' fifth state crown. This was Coach Wood's second set of back-to-back state championships. After the season ended, the city of Brownwood decided to set aside a special day for Coach Wood. On 1971-05-14, he was honored at a ceremony where he was accompanied by former players, coaches, senators, representatives, the Lieutenant Governor of Texas, University of Texas Head Coach Darrell Royal, and even former President Lyndon Johnson, who was the key speaker at the ceremony.

The 1971 season opened with two losses to Abilene Cooper and Abilene High, but Coach Wood left no disappointment the rest of the season, and the Lions claimed their fifth straight district title. Coach Wood was able to get his team as far as the state semifinals, where they were defeated 10 to 8 by Plano. In 1972, Brownwood opened their season in the newly built Cen-Tex Stadium. Abilene Cooper upset the stadium's christening with a 27 to 13 victory over the Lions. The next week Sweetwater cost Brownwood another loss. Iowa Park and Burkburnett also defeated the Lions before the season finally ended. Even though Brownwood had a winning season with six wins, those four losses cost them their long held district title and their shot at the state playoffs. In 1973, Brownwood defeated Abilene Cooper for the first time in seven years. The Lions would go on to take nine more victories, but a loss to Wichita Falls Hirschi cost them the state playoffs. The district championship was declared a tie, but because they had defeated Brownwood, Hirschi advanced to the state playoffs.

In 1974, Brownwood lost their season opener to Abilene Cooper, but went undefeated the rest of the season to claim the district championship. They won two playoff games before tying Gainesville at 20. Gainesville advanced to the finals on first downs, and the Lions turned in their equipment. In 1975, Coach Wood suited out his son, Jim Wood, at the end position. That year, Brownwood lost their opening game to Abilene Cooper, and a loss to Perryton in district play cost the Lions the district title. The 1977 season fared better. After an undefeated season, the Lions clinched the district title and advanced through the state playoffs only to lose the state championship game to Dickinson, 40 to 28. In 1978, Brownwood lost the opening game to Abilene Cooper, but that game was later forfeited and Brownwood went undefeated the rest of the season to reclaim the district title. Coach Wood led the team to their sixth state championship with an undefeated record of fifteen wins.

Wood opened up the 1979 season with a loss to Abilene Cooper. The Lions suffered a second loss to San Angelo Lake View, but Coach Wood was able to scratch nine more wins on his record to claim the district title. The Lions won their first playoff game only to lose, 15 to 11 to Beaumont Hebert in the state quarterfinals. The next season, Coach Wood lost the opening games to Abilene Cooper and Breckenridge. The Lions would tie another non-conference game to Weatherford at 0 before going undefeated the rest of the season and claiming another district title. 1980 also played another role in Brownwood's history, as Cen-Tex Stadium was renamed Gordon Wood stadium. The Lions inaugurated the stadium's new name with a 34 to 7 victory over Stephenville on October 24. After the regular season, Wood's Lions won the opening round of the playoffs against Wichita Falls Hirschi, but lost to Lubbock Estacado 14 to 0 in the quarterfinals. The Lions turned in their gear with eight wins, three losses, and one tie.

Wood started the 1981 season with a loss to Abilene Cooper, but that would be the only loss the Lions would see that season. Brownwood went on to win thirteen victories to claim another district title and their seventh state championship. The Lions opened up the next season with their first win over Abilene Cooper since 1977. That game was also historical because it was Wood's 366th win, which tied Red Franklin's record set back in 1958. When Brownwood won their next game over Weatherford, Coach Wood became the winningest high school football coach in the United States with 367 wins. Although his team lost to San Angelo Central and another loss to Cleburne (9–3 at TCU's Amon G. Carter Stadium, est attendance of 38,000 fans) cost the Lions their district crown the UIL passed a new rule in 1982, which allowed two teams from each district to advance to the state playoffs. Brownwood took the second place spot, but lost their first game in the playoffs to Gainesville, 14 to 12. Wood's team put away their cleats with nine wins and three losses.

In 1983, Coach Wood suffered non-conference losses to Abilene Cooper and San Angelo Central, and a 30–3 home, district loss to the Cleburne Yellow Jackets cost Brownwood's Lions the district title. Wood won the rest of the regular season games that year finishing with eight wins, but Brownwood lost a nail-biter to Vernon 11 to 6 in the first playoff game. Wood took the Lions to six more wins in 1984, but losses to Cleburne, Abilene Cooper, and Everman, and a tie with the Killeen Kangaroos left Brownwood in third place in their conference. The Lions had to sit out the 1984 playoff season. Wood lost three regular season games in 1985 to Killeen, Joshua, and the Cleburne Yellow Jackets. But the Lions tied for second place in their district and made it into the state playoffs. Brownwood defeated Mineral Wells in the first playoff game, but lost to Lubbock Estacado 29 to 28 in the quarterfinals. That was Wood's last game and he ended the season with eight wins and four losses. Wood spent twenty-six seasons at Brownwood before he retired at the age of 71. Altogether at Brownwood, Coach Wood won 15 district championships, 2 co-district championships, seven state championships, and gained a record of 257 wins, 52 losses, and 7 ties, an 82% winning record.

== Legacy ==
Coach Paul "Bear" Bryant of Alabama was once asked why he left Texas A&M for the University of Alabama. Bryant said, "I left Texas A&M because my school called me. Mama called, and when Mama calls, then you just have to come running." Bryant had played at Alabama from 1931–1934. Later, Bryant was again asked why he left A&M, and he replied, "I had to leave Texas. As long as Gordon Wood was there, I could never be the best coach in the state."

Wood is remembered throughout the coaching realms as always being a student of football. Former Dallas Cowboys' head coach, Bill Parcells, once told the story of how Wood drove five hours each day for weeks just to watch his Texas Tech linebackers practice. Baylor's former head coach, Grant Teaff, said that Wood once spent the night in his film room just to ask how a particular play had been run. He had also been a major opponent to the "no pass, no play" laws of the early 1980s. Wood hardly lost any players after the laws had been passed.

After his retirement, Wood stayed very active in the coaches associations he had become involved with over the years. He gave an abundant number of speeches and is notable for being one of Grant Teaff's Master Coaches in 2002. Over the years, Wood developed several medical conditions including skin tumors, artificial hips, a stroke, and having triple bypass surgery in 1990. He attempted to keep up with his hobbies, but over the years his conditions would no longer allow him to do so. The only hobby Wood would never give up is football. Even after retirement, he would travel across the state to watch high school teams compete on the gridiron. He watched many high school games vigorously until he died in December 2003. Coach Wood suffered from a heart attack and died at the age of 89.

== Record ==
Wood set a state and national record with a total of 396 wins, 91 losses, and 15 ties in 43 seasons as a head Texas high school football coach, an 80% winning record. Over those 502 games, Wood made stops at eight schools and won eleven state championships, nine in football. His first state title came from his 1948 Seminole track team, and his second was his 1954 Stamford golf team. The first two of his nine football state championships came from his 1955 and 1956 Stamford teams. He won seven more at Brownwood in 1960, 1965, 1967, 1969, 1970, 1978, and 1981. On top of that he either won or shared 25 district titles.

Wood's original record had been believed to be 405–88–12 (81%). He was awarded for that record at the Texas Sports Hall of Fame, which had inducted him in 1983. Coach Wood was believed to be the only coach to ever achieve four hundred wins, however, the 405 wins record came under scrutiny when researchers found discrepancies in 2001. After corrections were made, the Dallas Morning News reported that his record had been modified and officially stood at 396–91–15. Since his retirement, four other high school coaches in the US, including Coach G.A. Moore from Sherman, Texas, have broken Coach Wood's 396 wins record.

== Awards and accomplishments ==
On top of setting the record for most wins in the twentieth century, Coach Wood has received numerous other awards and accomplishments. He coached four Texas All Star Teams: two in 1957 and 1958, and two at the Oil Bowl Classic in 1977 and 1985. His teams won in 1958 and 1977. Coach Wood also gained experience with professional football when he coached the summer camp for the Canadian League's Winnipeg Blue Bombers from 1972 to 1974.

The Texas Sportswriters Association named Wood Coach of the Year three times: 1956, 1970, and 1978. The Texas High School Coaches Association named him their president in 1959 and inducted him into their Hall of Honor in 1967. Hardin–Simmons University presented Wood with the Distinguished Alumni Award in 1979 and inducted him into the Hall of Fame in 1996. In 1979, the National High School Athletic Coaches Association named him the National High School Football Coach of the Year and, in 1996, inducted him into their Hall of Fame . The American Football Coaches Association decided to honor Wood in 1983; the same year he was inducted into the Texas High School Coaches Hall of Fame and the Texas Sports Hall of Fame. In 1984, Wood was inducted into the National High School Hall of Fame.

The Touchdown Club of Houston presented Wood with the Touchdowner of the Year Award in 1986. In 1999, the NCAA presented Wood with the Football Coaches of America Lifetime Achievement Award (Grant Teaff Award). In 1993, Martin Communications Publications named Coach Wood Co-Coach of the Century along with Coach Paul Tyson in their Tops in Texas. In 1999, the Dallas Morning News named Wood Coach of the Century. Wood liked the name so much, it became the title of his 2001 autobiography, Coach of the Century: an Autobiography by Gordon Wood. Of all the honors Coach Wood has received, his personal favorite was having Brownwood's football stadium named for him in 1980. Wood had been deeply involved in building the stadium. He was also the best coach of Texas high school football ever.
