= San Angelo Stadium =

Stadium in San Angelo, Texas

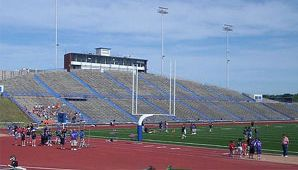
- Interactive map of San Angelo Stadium
- Location: 1919 Knickerbocker; San Angelo, Tx 76904
- Coordinates: 31°25′50″N 100°27′37″W
- Owner: San Angelo ISD
- Operator: San Angelo ISD
- Capacity: 17,500
- Surface: Safe Play Plus Artificial Turf

Construction
- Groundbreaking: 1956
- Opened: Sept. 28, 1956
- Cost: $12 million

Tenants
- San Angelo Central High Bobcats (UIL); San Angelo Lake View High Chiefs (UIL)

San Angelo Stadium is a stadium in San Angelo, Texas. Built in 1956, it holds 17,500 people, and is primarily used for football. It is home to the Central High School Bobcats and the Lake View High School Chiefs. It is the fourth-largest stadium used for high school football in Texas. From its construction in 1956 through 2014, it was also the home field for Angelo State University. In March 2014, the university announced it would be upgrading its existing on-campus stadium and moving all home games to that location.

== History ==
The stadium was built in 1956, expanded in 1963, and underwent major renovations in 2005. Photographs of the stadium were featured in an exhibition at the Museum of Modern Art in New York City as an outstanding example of modern engineering.

In December 2008, the school board approved a new $7 million field house to replace the original deteriorated facility. The new field house will include five locker rooms. One for Central High School and two more for Lakeview High School and visitors. The new addition will also provide space for a new weight room, training room, and multiple coaches offices.
