= Tankersley, Texas =

Tankersley
- Unincorporated community
- Location within Texas Location within the United States
- Coordinates: 31°20′59″N 100°38′36″W
- Country: United States
- State: Texas
- County: Tom Green
- Elevation: 2,011 ft (613 m)
- Time zone: UTC-6 (Central (CST))
  - Summer (DST): UTC-5 (CDT)
- Area code: Area code 325
- GNIS feature ID: 1369595

Tankersley, also known as Tankersly and MacGrath, is an unincorporated community in west-central Tom Green County, Texas, United States. Tankersley is located on U.S. Route 67, Farm to Market Road 2335 and a BNSF Railway line.

== History ==
Tankersley was named for Richard Franklin Tankersly, who donated the land for the community. A post office opened in Tankersley in 1910 and closed in 1963. The community's population reached 75 in 1946, but fell to 20 by 1953; its population remained at 20 in 1990. By 1980, the community still contained a school, a cemetery, and the West Texas Boys Ranch. In 2003, a FedEx Cessna Caravan crashed on a plot of land belonging to the West Texas Boys Ranch.

== Education ==
Residents are within the San Angelo Independent School District. Residents are zoned to Lamar Elementary School, Glenn Middle School, and Central High School.

In 1933, a school in Tankersley had 83 students and three teachers. The school was indicated in the 1936 county highway map. In the 1980s, the Tankersly–Twin Mountain School remained in the area.

Residents of the West Texas Boys Ranch are enrolled in the Irion County Independent School District.

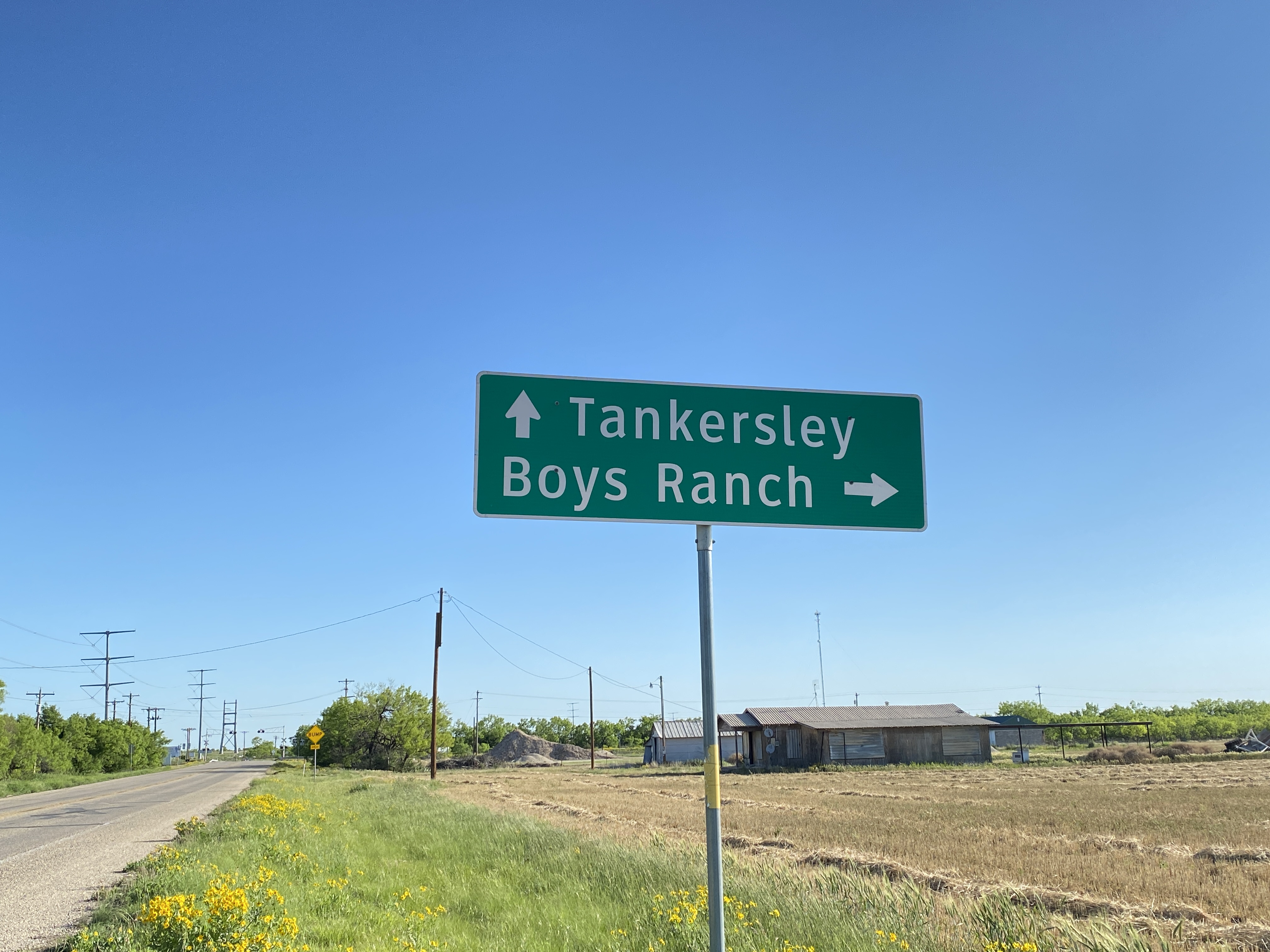
Tankersley, Texas road sign
