= SAISD =

SAISD may refer to:

- San Angelo Independent School District
- San Antonio Independent School District
