= Emory Bellard =

American College Football Coach

Biographical details
- Born: December 17, 1927; Luling, Texas, U.S.
- Died: February 10, 2011 (aged 83); Georgetown, Texas, U.S.

Playing career
- 1946–1947: Texas
- 1948–1949: Southwest Texas State

Coaching career (HC unless noted)
- 1952–1954: Ingleside HS (TX)
- 1955–1959: Breckenridge HS (TX)
- 1960–1966: San Angelo Central HS (TX)
- 1967–1971: Texas (OC)
- 1972–1978: Texas A&M
- 1979–1985: Mississippi State
- 1988–1993: Spring Westfield HS (TX)

Head coaching record
- Overall: 85–69 (college); 177–58–10 (high school)
- Bowls: 2–3

Accomplishments and honors

Championships
- 1 SWC (1975); 6 Texas state championships (1951, 1952, 1954, 1958, 1959, 1966)

Awards
- Sporting News Coach of the Year (1975); SWC Coach of the Year (1975)

Emory Dilworth Bellard (December 17, 1927 – February 10, 2011) was an American college and high school football coach and the inventor of the Wishbone formation. He was the head football coach at Texas A&M University from 1972 to 1978 and at Mississippi State University from 1979 until 1985.

Bellard died on February 10, 2011, after battling amyotrophic lateral sclerosis (Lou Gehrig's disease) since the fall of 2010.

Bellard is a member of the Texas Sports Hall of Fame and the Texas High School Sports Hall Of Fame. He also won two National Championships at Texas as the offensive coordinator.

== Early life ==
A native of Luling, Texas, Bellard was one of 12 children. His father was a geologist and driller who arrived in Central Texas in the late 1920s to take part in the emerging oil boom.

When he was 12 years old his family moved to Aransas Pass, Texas to facilitate his father’s recuperation after an accident, but his father succumbed to the injuries and died when Bellard was young. His mother managed a fishing bungalow, where he helped clean fish and made beds. As a junior he transferred to Aransas Pass High School so that he could play football. He graduated from the school in 1945.

He went on to attend the University of Texas at Austin, where he played running back during his freshman year under coach Dana X. Bible. Bellard broke his leg during his sophomore season and transferred to Southwest Texas State University (now Texas State University) from which he graduated in 1949.

== Coaching career ==
=== High school ===
Bellard was a high school head coach for 21 seasons, where he achieved a record of 177–59–9 and won three state titles. During his time as a high school coach, he explored the idea of running an offense out of a three-back formation.

Bellard started coaching in 1949 and became the head coach at Ingleside High School, a Class B school in Ingleside, Texas in 1952. He guided the school to two consecutive regional wins (as far as Class B football went) in 1953 and 1954, and a street near Ingleside High School is named after him. He was then hired to succeed Joe Kerbel at Breckenridge High School, then a state powerhouse in the second-highest UIL classification. Under coach Kerbel and his predecessor Cooper Robbins, Breckenridge won three 3A state championships in 1951, 1952, and 1954. Bellard continued that winning tradition with state titles in 1958 and 1959.

In 1960, Bellard was selected over Gordon Wood to replace Bob Harrell as head coach at Central High School in San Angelo, Texas. San Angelo Central was playing in the highly competitive District 2-4A, nicknamed the "Little Southwest Conference", against perennial state champions such as Abilene and Odessa Permian. Bellard amassed a 59–19–2 record at San Angelo Central, winning a 4A state championship in 1966. He then left the high school ranks for the University of Texas at Austin.

During this time he coached at the 1960 Texas High School All-Star football game and was named the 1962 West Texas Coach of the Year.

In 1988, Bellard returned to the high school level, coaching Spring Westfield High School near Houston, Texas, to a 41–22–5 record over six seasons.

At Spring Westfield he won the 1993 Distinguished Coach Award from the National Football Foundation.

=== College ===
==== Texas ====
In 1967, Bellard was hired as the linebackers coach at the University of Texas at Austin and was moved to offensive coordinator in 1968. At this time, he developed and implemented the wishbone formation, a system inspired by the variations of the veer developed by Homer Rice and run by Bill Yeoman at the University of Houston. He helped Texas to win 4 straight Southwest Conference Championships, 2 National Championships and 2 Cotton Bowls.

==== Texas A&M ====
Bellard became head coach at Texas A&M in 1972, taking over head-coaching duties from Gene Stallings. In his seven years at Texas A&M, he finished with a record of 48–27 and three top-15 finishes.

Acting as his own offensive coordinator, Bellard hired former high school football coaches to assist him as backfield coaches, including Gil Bartosh (1973) and Chuck Moser (1974–1978). Both Bartosh and Moser had won Texas state championships. In 1975, however, Bellard hired Tom Wilson away from Jim Carlen's Texas Tech coaching staff to serve as the Aggies' offensive coordinator. For the defensive department, Bellard hired Melvin Robertson, one of the top defensive coaches, away from Bill Yeoman's coaching staff at the University of Houston. Robertson became defensive coordinator, and among his assistants were R. C. Slocum and Dan LaGrasta.

Bellard's first two seasons at Texas A&M were difficult, as his Aggies finished 3–8 and 5–6, respectively. In 1974, with a pair of his own recruiting classes suited to run the wishbone formation, the Aggies went 8–3, then followed it up with two 10–2 seasons, including a pair of wins over Royal and the Longhorns and three consecutive bowl games. After starting the 1978 season 4–0, Bellard resigned mid-season after two consecutive losses: 33–0 to Houston and 24–6 to Baylor.

Bellard helped to desegregate college football by recruiting African-American athletes to Texas A&M. He is also helped to implement women’s athletic programs at the university. While at A&M he was named the 1975 AFC College Coach of the Year and received the 1975 Academy of American Football Gold Cup.

He was named to the Texas A&M University’s Athletic Hall of Fame in 1994.

==== Mississippi State ====
After A&M, Bellard spent seven seasons as head coach at Mississippi State University. His best years as the Bulldogs head coach were in 1980 and 1981, when his team finished 9–3 and 8–4, respectively. Also, Bellard was the coach when Mississippi State defeated number 1, undefeated Alabama 6-3 in Jackson, Mississippi in 1980.

However, the Bulldogs significantly regressed after 1981. In the next four seasons, he only won a total of four games in SEC play. Before the 1985 season, Bellard boldly predicted that the Bulldogs would rebound and win their first SEC title since 1941. They not only failed to do so, but went winless in SEC play. Bellard was fired after the season.

== Head coaching record ==
=== College ===
Year	Team	Overall	Conference	Standing	Bowl/playoffs	Coaches^{#}	AP^{°}
Texas A&M Aggies (Southwest Conference) (1972–1978)
1972	Texas A&M	3–8	2–5	T–7th			
1973	Texas A&M	5–6	3–4	6th			
1974	Texas A&M	8–3	5–2	T–2nd		15	16
1975	Texas A&M	10–2	6–1	T–1st	L Liberty	12	11
1976	Texas A&M	10–2	6–2	3rd	W Sun	8	7
1977	Texas A&M	8–4	4–4	5th	L Astro-Bluebonnet		
1978	Texas A&M	4–2*	1–2*				
Texas A&M:		48–27	27–20	*Bellard resigned after 6 games			
Mississippi State Bulldogs (Southeastern Conference) (1979–1985)
1979	Mississippi State	3–8	2–4	8th			
1980	Mississippi State	9–3	5–1	3rd	L Sun		19
1981	Mississippi State	8–4	4–2	3rd	W Hall of Fame	17	
1982	Mississippi State	5–6	2–4	8th			
1983	Mississippi State	3–8	1–5	8th			
1984	Mississippi State	4–7	1–5	T–9th			
1985	Mississippi State	5–6	0–6	10th			
Mississippi State:		37–42	15–27				
Total:		85–69					
National championship Conference title Conference division title or championship game berth
^{#}Rankings from final Coaches Poll.; ^{°}Rankings from final AP Poll.

=== High school ===
Year	Team	Overall	Conference	Standing	Bowl/playoffs
Ingleside Mustangs () (1952–1954)
1952	Ingleside	8–3		1st	
1953	Ingleside	12–0		1st	
1954	Ingleside	12–0		1st	
Ingleside:		32–3			
Breckenridge Buckaroos () (1955–1959)
1955	Breckenridge	10–3		1st	
1956	Breckenridge	4–6			
1957	Breckenridge	7–3–1		1st	
1958	Breckenridge	13–1		1st	
1959	Breckenridge	11–1–2		1st	
Breckenridge:		45–14–3			
San Angelo Central Bobcats () (1960–1966)
1960	San Angelo Central	5–5			
1961	San Angelo Central	10–2		1st	
1962	San Angelo Central	8–4			
1963	San Angelo Central	9–2–1		1st	
1964	San Angelo Central	5–4–1			
1965	San Angelo Central	9–1			
1966	San Angelo Central	13–1		1st	
San Angelo Central:		59–19–2			
Spring Westfield Mustangs () (1988–1993)
1988	Spring Westfield	5–4–1			
1989	Spring Westfield	6–4–1			
1990	Spring Westfield	5–5			
1991	Spring Westfield	8–3		2nd	
1992	Spring Westfield	10–1–2		1st	
1993	Spring Westfield	7–5–1		2nd	
Spring Westfield:		41–22–5			
Total:		177–58–10			
National championship Conference title Conference division title or championship game berth
