= Jimmie Keeling =

American football coach (born 1935)

Biographical details
- Born: August 10, 1935 (age 91); San Angelo, Texas, U.S.

Coaching career (HC unless noted)
- 1966: Elgin HS (TX)
- 1968–1969: Lubbock Estacado HS (TX)
- 1970–1971: Andrews HS (TX)
- 1975–1978: Lamar Consol. HS (TX)
- 1979–1988: San Angelo Central HS (TX)
- 1989: John Tyler HS (TX)
- 1990–2010: Hardin–Simmons

Head coaching record
- Overall: 172–53 (college); 182–125–12 (high school)
- Tournaments: 5–5 (NAIA D-II playoffs); 4–6 (NCAA D-III playoffs)

Accomplishments and honors

Championships
- 3 TIAA (1993–1995); 7 ASC (1996, 1998–2001, 2003–2004)

Jimmie Keeling (born August 10, 1935) is an American former football coach. He served as the head football coach at Hardin–Simmons University in Abilene, Texas from 1990 to 2010. After a highly successful coaching career in Texas high school football, Keeling was chosen to revive the Hardin–Simmons Cowboys football program, which hadn't played a football game since 1963. Keeling became the winningest coach in Hardin–Simmons football history in 1997, surpassing Warren B. Woodson.

Keeling graduated from Evant High School in 1953. He started his collegiate career at Tarleton State University, then a junior college, and finished his undergraduate work at Howard Payne University in 1958. Jimmie Keeling's first coaching job was as assistant football coach at Hico High School, Hico, Texas, from September 1956 to June 1957. His first head coaching job came soon after, taking the reins as head coach and athletic director at Dublin in 1959.

Keeling had several stops in his early coaching career, namely at Tulia, Elgin, Lubbock Estacado, Andrews and Lamar Consolidated. His 1968 Lubbock Estacado squad went 14–0 and claimed the Class 3A state championship, beating Refugio High School, 14–0. He also guided Lamar Consolidated to a regional championship in 1978.

In 1979 he overtook a storied football program at San Angelo Central, and remained there for 10 seasons. He guided the Bobcats all the way to the Class 5A regional championships in 1982 and in 1988, reached the state quarterfinals. Keeling's last high school stop was at John Tyler High School in Tyler, Texas for one year.

Hardin-Simmons chose Keeling to revive their football program in 1990, after a 37-year absence. Keeling's Hardin-Simmons Cowboys had 19 consecutive winning seasons. His teams won 10 conference titles and played in 19 playoff games, and Keeling was named conference coach of the year six times.

In 1995, Keeling was inducted into the Texas High School Coaches Association Hall of Honor. Keeling posted a career high school record of 182–125–12.

== Head coaching record ==
=== College ===
Year	Team	Overall	Conference	Standing	Bowl/playoffs
Hardin–Simmons Cowboys (Texas Intercollegiate Athletic Association) (1990–1995)
1990	Hardin–Simmons	3–6	2–4	T–5th	
1991	Hardin–Simmons	5–5	3–2	T–2nd	
1992	Hardin–Simmons	10–2	4–1	2nd	L NAIA Division II Quarterfinal
1993	Hardin–Simmons	10–3	5–0	1st	L NAIA Division II Semifinal
1994	Hardin–Simmons	8–3	4–1	T–1st	L NAIA Division II Quarterfinal
1995	Hardin–Simmons	9–2	7–1	T–1st	L NAIA Division II Quarterfinal
Hardin–Simmons Cowboys (American Southwest Conference) (1990–1995)
1996	Hardin–Simmons	8–3	3–1	T–1st	L NAIA Division II First Round
1997	Hardin–Simmons	7–3	2–3	T–3rd	
1998	Hardin–Simmons	9–1	7–0	1st	
1999	Hardin–Simmons	12–1	7–0	1st	L NCAA Division III Quarterfinal
2000	Hardin–Simmons	12–1	9–0	1st	L NCAA Division III Semifinal
2001	Hardin–Simmons	8–2	8–0	1st	L NCAA Division III First Round
2002	Hardin–Simmons	8–2	7–2	3rd	
2003	Hardin–Simmons	8–2	8–1	T–1st	
2004	Hardin–Simmons	10–1	9–0	1st	L NCAA Division III Second Round
2005	Hardin–Simmons	8–2	7–2	T–2nd	
2006	Hardin–Simmons	8–2	6–1	2nd	L NCAA Division III First Round
2007	Hardin–Simmons	6–4	6–2	T–2nd	
2008	Hardin–Simmons	9–2	7–1	1st	L NCAA Division III First Round
2009	Hardin–Simmons	6–4	5–3	4th	
2010	Hardin–Simmons	8–2	6–2	3rd	
Hardin–Simmons:		172–53	122–27		
Total:		172–53			
National championship Conference title Conference division title or championship game berth
