= WTBR =

WTBR may refer to:

- WTBR-FM, a radio station broadcasting in Pittsfield, Massachusetts, United States
- West Texas Boys Ranch, a Christian private residential community for boys located in Tankersley, Tom Green County, Texas
