= Preston Davis (American football) =

American football player (born 1962)

No. 27
- Position: Cornerback

Personal information
- Born: March 10, 1962 (age 64); Lubbock, Texas, U.S.
- Listed height: 5 ft 11 in (1.80 m)
- Listed weight: 180 lb (82 kg)

Career information
- High school: Estacado (Lubbock)
- College: Baylor (1980–1983)
- NFL draft: 1984: undrafted

Career history
- New England Patriots (1984)*; Indianapolis Colts (1984–1986); New Orleans Saints (1987)*
- * Offseason or practice squad member only
- Stats at Pro Football Reference

Preston Davis (born March 10, 1962) is an American former professional football cornerback who played three seasons with the Indianapolis Colts of the National Football League (NFL). He played college football at Baylor University.

== Early life and college ==
Preston Davis was born on March 10, 1962, in Lubbock, Texas. He attended Estacado High School in Lubbock.

Davis was a member of the Baylor Bears of Baylor University from 1980 to 1983 and a three-year letterman from 1981 to 1983. He recorded three interceptions in 1982.

== Professional career ==
After going undrafted in the 1984 NFL draft, Davis signed with the New England Patriots on July 6. He was released on August 27, 1984.

Davis was signed by the Indianapolis Colts on September 18, 1984. He played in 12 games, starting eight, for the Colts during his rookie year in 1984 and recorded one interception. He started all 16 games during the 1985 season, totaling two interceptions and two fumble recoveries. The Colts finished the year with a 5–11 record. Davis played in eight games in 1986 before being released on October 29, 1986.

Davis signed with the New Orleans Saints on April 1, 1987. He was released on August 17, 1987.
