= Evant, Texas =

- Town
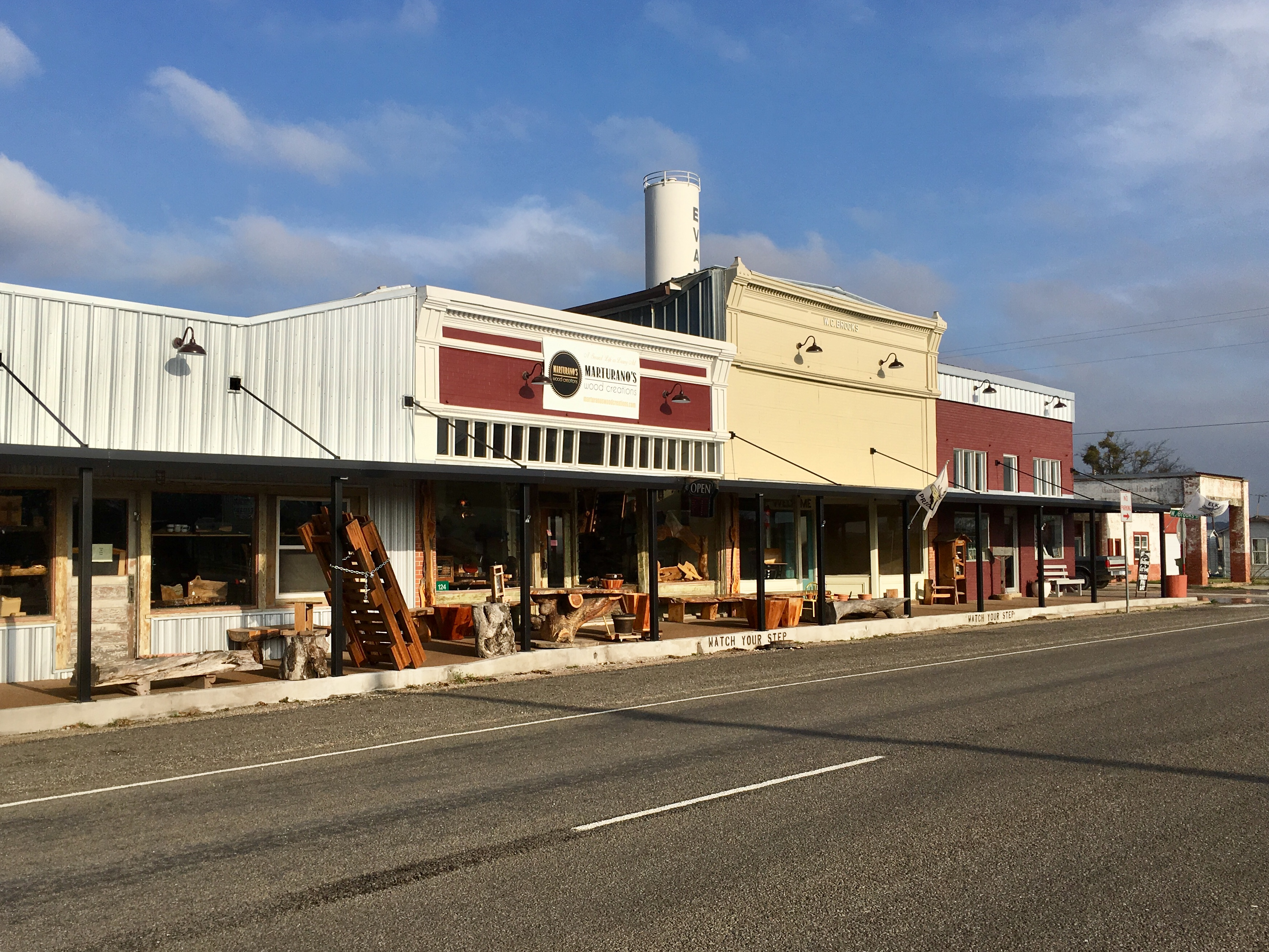
- Downtown Evant, Texas

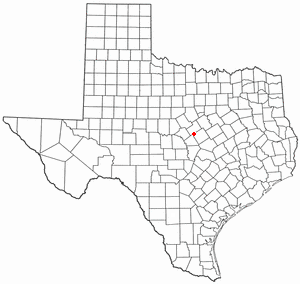
- Location of Evant, Texas

- Coordinates: 31°28′34″N 98°09′01″W
- Country: United States
- State: Texas
- Counties: Coryell, Hamilton

Area
  - Total: 0.61 sq mi (1.58 km^{2})
  - Land: 0.61 sq mi (1.58 km^{2})
  - Water: 0 sq mi (0.00 km^{2})
- Elevation: 1,250 ft (380 m)

Population (2020)
  - Total: 455
  - Estimate (2022): 461
  - Density: 672.7/sq mi (259.74/km^{2})
- Time zone: UTC-6 (Central (CST))
  - Summer (DST): UTC-5 (CDT)
- ZIP code: 76525
- Area code: 254
- FIPS code: 48-24864
- GNIS feature ID: 2412607
- Website: City website

Evant (/ˈiːvænt/ EE-vant) is a town in Coryell and Hamilton counties in central Texas, United States. As of the 2020 census, Evant had a population of 455. The Coryell County portion of Evant is part of the Killeen–Temple–Fort Hood Metropolitan Statistical Area.

== History ==
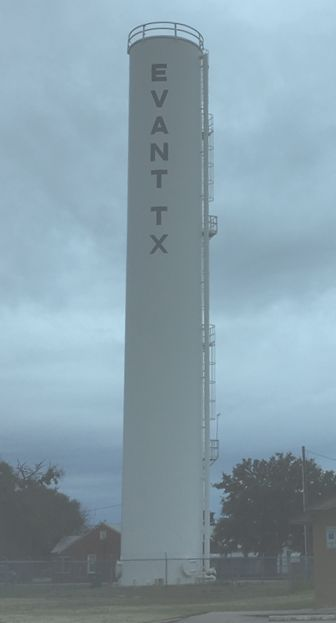
Water tower of Evant

The town of Evant was first a settlement called "Langford Cove", settled by Asa Langford and his family in 1855. Langford served as postmaster in the first post office, named "Cove", established in February 1876. By the late 1850s, Langford had built a general store, a blacksmith shop, and a sawmill near the current site of the town.

An Alabama man named Evan T. Brooks purchased some 160 acres (0.65 km^{2}) of land from Langford in the late 1870s. In 1881, Brooks donated 60 acres (240,000 m^{2}) of land "for sale and settlement as a town", and by 1884 the growing community changed its name to "Evant" in Brooks' honor. In the 1890s, the community had a cotton gin, three general stores, a gristmill, and a hotel. Its population was around 10 residents.

Evant continued to grow, reporting a peak population of 550 sometime in the 1950s. The town was formally incorporated in the mid-1970s. Its population at the time was 540 and has continued to shrink. According to the 1990 census, the town's population was 444, and by 2000 it had dropped to 393.

== Geography ==
Evant is located on the border of Coryell and Hamilton counties. U.S. Routes 84 and 281 intersect on the north side of town; US 84 leads east 24 miles (39 km) to Gatesville and west 25 miles (40 km) to Goldthwaite, while US 281 leads north 16 miles (26 km) to Hamilton and south 29 miles (47 km) to Lampasas.

According to the United States Census Bureau, Evant has a total area of 0.62 square miles (1.6 km^{2}), all land.

=== Climate ===
The climate in this area is characterized by hot, humid summers and generally mild to cool winters. According to the Köppen Climate Classification system, Evant has a humid subtropical climate, abbreviated "Cfa" on climate maps.

== Demographics ==
Historical population
Census	Pop.	Note	%±
1980	425		—
1990	444		4.5%
2000	393		−11.5%
2010	426		8.4%
2020	455		6.8%
2022 (est.)	461	▲	1.3%
U.S. Decennial Census

As of the census of 2000, there were 393 people, 159 households, and 100 families residing in the town. The population density was 645.0 inhabitants per square mile (249.0/km^{2}). There were 189 housing units at an average density of 310.2 per square mile (119.8/km^{2}). The racial makeup of the town was 87.28% White, 1.53% Native American, 0.76% Asian, 0.25% Pacific Islander, 7.89% from other races, and 2.29% from two or more races. Hispanic or Latino of any race were 15.52% of the population.

There were 159 households, out of which 33.3% had children under the age of 18 living with them, 49.7% were married couples living together, 11.3% had a female householder with no husband present, and 36.5% were non-families. 34.0% of all households were made up of individuals, and 20.8% had someone living alone who was 65 years of age or older. The average household size was 2.47 and the average family size was 3.25.

In the town, the population was spread out, with 31.6% under the age of 18, 4.6% from 18 to 24, 27.2% from 25 to 44, 17.3% from 45 to 64, and 19.3% who were 65 years of age or older. The median age was 36 years. For every 100 females, there were 95.5 males. For every 100 females age 18 and over, there were 83.0 males.

The median income for a household in the town was $22,500, and the median income for a family was $30,227. Males had a median income of $23,333 versus $21,250 for females. The per capita income for the town was $12,589. About 14.7% of families and 25.4% of the population were below the poverty line, including 35.7% of those under age 18 and 11.8% of those age 65 or over.

== Education ==
The town is served by the Evant Independent School District, and is home to the Evant High School Elks.

Both Coryell and Hamilton counties are in the service area, defined by the Texas Education Code, of Central Texas College.
