= Evant High School =

Location
- 101 Memory Lane; Evant, Texas 76525-0339; United States; 31.475092°N 98.151813°W

Information
- School type: Public high school
- School district: Evant Independent School District
- Principal: Craig Taylor
- Teaching staff: 10.39 (FTE)
- Grades: 7-12
- Enrollment: 98 (2023-2024)
- Student to teacher ratio: 9.43
- Colors: Black & Gold
- Athletics conference: UIL Class A
- Mascot: Elk
- Yearbook: The Elk
- Website: Evant School

Evant High School is a public high school located in Evant, Texas (USA) and classified as a 1A school by the UIL. It is part of the Evant Independent School District located in northwest Coryell County. In 2015, the school was rated "Met Standard" by the Texas Education Agency.

== Athletics ==
The Evant Elks compete in these sports -

- Basketball
- Cross Country
- 6-Man Football
- Track and Field
- Volleyball

== Notable alumnus ==
Jimmie Keeling - Former head football coach at Hardin–Simmons University in Abilene, Texas.
