= Lubbock Independent School District =

School district in Texas, United States

- 1628 19th St. Lubbock, Texas, 79401

District information
- Grades: Pre-K through 12
- Established: 1907
- Superintendent: Kathy Rollo, Ed.D.
- NCES District ID: 4828500

Students and staff
- Students: 27,759
- Teachers: 1,969.70 (FTE)

Other information
- Website: www.lubbockisd.org

Lubbock Independent School District was established in 1907. Accredited by the Texas Education Agency, Lubbock ISD is the largest school district that serves the city of Lubbock, Texas (USA). The Lubbock Independent School District covers 85.5 square miles (220 km^{2}) and contains nearly 900 acres (3.6 km^{2}) of school properties that are owned by the local taxpayers. Those properties include 61 campuses including 37 elementary schools (Grades Pre-K - 5), 4 early childhood schools, 11 middle schools (Grades 6–8), 4 high schools (Grades 9–12), 2 special purpose, and three alternative campuses.

Lubbock ISD facilities include an Advanced Technology Center for the teaching of computer operations and programming. The ATC also instructs students in Iron and Wood construction, and automobile technology.

The district also features an Aquatic Center. Schools use this Olympic indoor facility across west Texas for swimming and diving competitions. It also trains all third-grade students about water safety during a class time at their school. The Aquatic Center also offers special water fitness instruction for the staff of Lubbock ISD.

In 2009, the school district was rated "academically acceptable" by the Texas Education Agency.

== Schools ==
=== 5 High Schools (Grades 9–12) ===
- Estacado High School
- Coronado High School
- Lubbock High School
- Margaret Talkington School for Young Women Leaders
- Monterey High School

=== 9 Middle Schools (Grades 6–8) ===
- Atkins Middle School
- Cavazos Middle School
- Dunbar College Preparatory Academy
- Evans Middle School
- Hutchinson Middle School
- Irons Middle School
- Mackenzie Middle School
- McCool Academy
- Talkington School for Young Women Leaders

=== 37 Elementary Schools (Grades Pre-K - 5) ===
- Alderson Elementary School
- Bayless Elementary School
- Bean Elementary School
- Brown Elementary School
- Carmona-Harrison Elementary School
- Centennial Elementary School
- Ervin Elementary School
- Hardwick Elementary School
- Harwell Elementary School
- Honey Elementary School
- Maedgen Elementary School
- McWhorter Elementary School
- Miller Elementary School
- Parsons Elementary School
- Ramirez Charter School
- Roberts Elementary School
- Rush Elementary School
- Smith Elementary School
- Stewart Elementary School
- Waters Elementary School
- Wester Elementary School
- Wheelock Elementary School
- Whiteside Elementary School
- Williams Elementary School
- Wilson (Roscoe Wilson) Elementary School
- Wolffarth Elementary School
