= West Texas Boys Ranch =

Christian private residential community for boys in Texas

Coordinates: 31.332569°N 100.615393°W

West Texas Boys Ranch (WTBR) is a Christian private residential community for boys located near Tankersley, unincorporated Tom Green County, Texas, about 14 miles outside of San Angelo. The 963-acre (390 ha) facility is a 501(c)(3) nonprofit organization, and it is open to any qualified boy, regardless of his or his family's ability to pay the tuition. The ranch is not funded by the state and uses donations to fund its services. The ranch can accommodate up to 32 boys, and is licensed to accept ages 8 through 17 years old. The ranch is licensed to accept boys from Texas and the four bordering states of New Mexico, Oklahoma, Arkansas, and Louisiana. The ranch does not take custody of its boys, and it is not a boot camp, detention center, drug rehabilitation center, or a "last resort" for hardcore juvenile offenders. It is also not a boarding school or a summer camp, but a residential treatment facility for troubled boys.

== History ==
The ranch has provided a community for boys since 1947.

In December 1999, former counselor Larry Wisenbaker pleaded guilty to multiple sexual crimes involving minors at St. Jude's Ranch for Children in Boulder City, Nevada. He had previously been accused of sexual misconduct involving 8 boys at West Texas Boys Ranch which had not been investigated by Texas police before he left the state. He was fired from West Texas Boys Ranch after complaints of sexual abuse early in his employment in 1998. Wisenbaker was sentenced to four life terms in prison in February 2000 after District Judge Kathy Hardcastle became aware that he was previously convicted of assaulting a child at Hephzibah Home for Children in Macon, Georgia.

In 2003 a FedEx Cessna Caravan crashed on a plot of land belonging to the ranch.

== Operations ==
The facility consists of 5 residential cottages (4 currently), each with max capacity of 8 boys. Each boy is assigned to a particular cottage, which is overseen by a husband and wife team. If a team has children, those children are also a part of the cottage household. Every boy participates in chores, such as cleaning his room, cleaning his shared bathroom, and cleaning his laundry. Several chores, such as mopping the kitchen, vacuuming the living room, and taking out the trash, are rotated among the boys. Each boy has a rank, depending on his behavior. The lowest rank with the fewest privileges is the Greenhorn, while the highest rank, Trail Boss, has the most privileges.There was also a former rank of Top hand even higher than Trail Bass (formerly Wrangler), but due to issues with boys who misused the level, it was removed from the system. Each level shows the depth to which each boy is trying to work the program, and the higher the level the more responsibility each boy has. Each boy can see his progress on a chart so he knows what he needs to do to attain a certain rank. Each resident works with livestock, such as cattle, show pigs, and horses. During the summer, boys work from morning until noon each weekday doing ranching jobs like cleaning out the arena, pig barn, or horse barn, or things needed like mending fence, cleaning up the grounds, painting, building, spraying cactus, etc. They are paid for their work during this time and it goes straight to their savings or "blue check" accounts. Boys also receive allowances every Friday which is dictated by their level and behavior for that week. They can also earn an extra money in their allowance for having the cleanest room out of everyone in their cottage that week.

Each boy is assigned a caseworker and has plans of service with goals from the boys, the ranch, and their parents or probation officers. They check in and build rapport with their caseworkers to improve and track their progress. They are also partnered with a counselor from West Texas Counseling and Guidance for their specific needs while attending WTBR. WTBR also works with the parents/guardians/probations officers for home visits and weekly communication with their child after the 30 day orientation period.

One of the biggest programs on ranch is the Horsebarn Program. Each boy gets the opportunity to learn how to properly take care of and ride a horse of their choice. From grooming and clean out to how to saddle and riding, they boys learn it all. As they improve they are taught to rope and work with livestock as well. The boys get the chance to show of their skills every year in October when the ranch holds its own WTBR Ranch Rodeo. The boys compete individually and in teams for various events and top contenders in each event receive belt buckles. One boy will be named Top Hand and receive a buckle as well. That boy is one who not only is doing well at the rodeo, but is documented as being well behaved, helpful, and a good sport during all horsebarn sessions and rodeo prep. Usually occurring on a Friday or Saturday, the rodeo is held at the arena on campus and staff and parents are encouraged to attend. The rodeo is open to the public as well.

WTBR is a Christian organization and parents and boys are made aware of this during admissions meetings and tours. Church is held Sunday evenings at the Chapel on campus. Cottages and their boys are also encouraged to attend youth groups with their own local churches as well. There are weekly devotionals at the horsebarn and the chapel rotates with visits from various churches in the Concho Valley and beyond. WTBR usually has boys volunteer during the summer to attend the Chrysalis weekend where they explore their faith with leaders and other boys their age at the Circle Six Ranch. Boys are expected to adhere to good manners and good moral behavior. This includes while they are living on the ranch and also while they are in town or off ranch on trips like Chrysalis and other volunteer opportunities with WTBR events, Fort Concho, Meals for the Elderly, and more. WTBR expects the boys to model good, Christian behavior for all opportunities including hunting and fishing trips (with safety courses), as well as fun things like going out to eat, going to the movies, trampoline park, escape rooms, San Angelo rodeo performances, and anything San Angelo has to offer and more.

== Composition ==
The cottages are Brown Cottage, Doss Cottage, Minear Cottage, and Stevens Cottage. Mabee Cottage is not currently in use, but is one of the older cottages built with river rock from Spring Creek, which serves as part of the perimeter of the ranch. Minear, named after Roy and Evelyn Minear, was built in 1983. Brown, funded by a donation from Wilbur Carr Brown of San Angelo, Texas, was built in 1984. Doss, funded by a donation from the M.S. Doss Foundation in Seminole, Texas, was built in 1985. Stevens, funded by a donation from Perry and Ruby Stevens of Fredericksburg, Texas, was built in 1985. In May of 2019, a tornado hit the ranch and damaged the gym, facilities offices, vocational building, and part of a cottage. Everyone was safe, but the ranch has had to remove buildings and go through the process of rebuilding and updating the campus when buildings could not be salvaged. Currently, the ranch offers an updated chapel, a Child Development Center for school and other classes, a pool, tennis/basketball courts, along with an updated gym that has a weight room, basketball court, volleyball nets, and ping pong games along with a full equipped kitchen and serving line for gatherings. There is also the Horsebarn and pens, arena, pig barn with pens, a vocational building with welding supplies, and space along Spring Creek with picnic tables, a fire pit built by the Boy Scouts, and fishing supplies.

== Education ==
Currently the ranch is partnering with a charter school to provide limited space for online schooling spots on campus in the Learning Center/Child Development Center for boys struggling with behaviors primarily in public school settings. Otherwise, they are enrolled in San Angelo ISD at either Central High School, Lonestar Middle School, or Bonham Elementary. If a boy has an issue at school, the school staff will notify the West Texas Boys Ranch staff, including their assigned caseworker. Irion County High School and San Angelo Texas Leadership Charter Academy are schools boys formerly attended. Education is very important and there are incentives for being named to the A Honor Roll and A/B Honor Roll as well as having tutors provided by the ranch. Boys are encouraged to participate in extracurriculars through the school and the ranch has seen everything including multiple sports, chess, debate, choir, band, orchestra, JROTC, and more. Boys of age can also attend driving school and receive their licenses while living at the ranch to prepare them for entering adult society. The ranch also has a scholarship through an endowment with the West Texas Boys Ranch Foundation where they can apply to receive help with their higher education upon leaving the ranch. Good grades will get them scholarship money for books, materials, food, supplies, housing, etc. During the summer, the ranch will partner with various organizations in San Angelo to provide classes and presentations for growth for boys to attend on campus. This can include financial literacy/bank tours, auto care/mechanics, teen health and healthy relationships/families, Texas Wildlife Association presentations, military recruiters, job readiness classes, health fairs, West Texas Counseling & Guidance (who the ranch partners with for boys to receive counseling sessions throughout their stay) presentations, Alcohol and Drug Awareness Center (ADAC) presentations, and even admissions recruiters from TSTC, etc.
