= Evant Independent School District =

School district in Texas

Coordinates: 31.4743°N 98.1520°W

Evant Independent School District is a public school district based in Evant, Texas (USA). It is located in western Coryell County and extends into a southern Hamilton and northern Lampasas counties. The district operates one school, Evant School serving grades PK-12. Of note, Evants ISD's rock gym is the largest man made rock wall in the area.

== Academic achievement ==
In 2009, the school district was rated "academically acceptable" by the Texas Education Agency.

== Special programs ==
=== Athletics ===
Evant High School plays six-man football.

== See also ==
- List of school districts in Texas
