= Bob Harrell =

American football player and coach (1915–2002)

Biographical details
- Born: September 25, 1915
- Died: December 2, 2002 (aged 87)

Playing career
- 1935–1938: TCU
- Position: Halfback

Coaching career (HC unless noted)
- 1953–1959: San Angelo Central HS (TX)
- 1961–1964: Irving HS (TX)

Accomplishments and honors

Championships
- National (1938)

Robert Harrell (September 25, 1915 – December 2, 2002) was an American football coach. He coached at the high school and collegiate level in Texas and Oklahoma.

== Playing career ==
Harrell grew up in Fort Worth, Texas. When he was a teenager, his father became too ill to work and left his wife and son and moved in with his own mother in Arlington. In spite of his desperate situation, Harrell stayed focused on his promising football career, and when his coach at Polytechnic High School, Wes Bradshaw, heard about the boy's predicament, he invited Harrell to stay with him.

Bradshaw encouraged Harrell to try out for a football scholarship at Texas Christian University in 1934, and Harrell successfully drew the attention of Dutch Meyer. On the first day of practice at TCU, Harrell – a high school quarterback – watched Sammy Baugh work out, and immediately chose to compete for the halfback position instead. He was a three-time letterman in 1935, 1937 and 1938.

== Coaching career ==
He was tougher than Bear Bryant.

— O. W. Follis, who served as Harrell's assistant at Lamesa.

Just after graduation, Harrell began his coaching career at the Central Texas town of DeLeon. However, World War II interrupted his career in 1941. Serving in the rank of a sergeant, Harrell was stationed on Camp Wolters near Mineral Wells, Texas, where he was in charge of sixty men.

After the war, Harrell restarted his coaching career, with stops at Odessa, Denison, Greenville, Lamesa, and Corpus Christi Miller. In 1953, he became head coach at San Angelo Central, before leaving in 1959.

In 1961, Harrell took over at Irving. In 1962, Irving went undefeated through the season, only to lose 27–7 to Borger in the bi-district game. Harrell ended his career in 1964.

He died in 2002.
