= Central High School (San Angelo, Texas) =

San Angelo Central High School

Location
- 655 Caddo Street; San Angelo, Texas 76901; United States; 31°27′50″N 100°27′01″W

Information
- Type: Public high school
- Established: 1958; 68 years ago
- School district: San Angelo Independent School District
- Principal: Jill Ross
- Teaching staff: 172.53 (FTE)
- Grades: 9–12
- Gender: Co-educational
- Enrollment: 3,029 (2023–2024)
- Student to teacher ratio: 17.56
- Campus size: 23-building campus on 40 acres
- Colors: Blue and Orange
- Athletics conference: District 2-6A
- Mascot: Bobcat (Dynamo, Dynamite and Dyna-Mini the Bobcats)
- Website: central.saisd.org

Central High School is a public high school in San Angelo, Texas. It is part of the San Angelo Independent School District. The school served grades 10–12, with a secondary campus for 9th grade until the 2024-2025 school year when the secondary "On Oakes" campus shut down, moving freshmen to the main campus on Caddo Street. Its mascot is the Bobcat. The school serves much of San Angelo and the unincorporated community of Tankersley.

== Athletics ==
With a reported enrollment of 2,993 (which combines the freshman campus and high school enrollments), the Bobcats of San Angelo Central compete with some of Texas' largest high schools as a member of Conference 6A of the University Interscholastic League, the state's governing body for public-school competition.

=== Soccer ===
The men's soccer team won the regional soccer tournament and went on to the state tournament in 2001. The Lady Cat Soccer team made the playoffs each year from 2002 to 2005 and reached the round of 16 in 2002. The Lady Cat soccer team, led by head coach Ben Henry, also made the playoffs four years running from 2008 to 2011, three times being knocked out in the bi-district round (2009, 2010, 2011) and once in the area championship game (2008).

=== Gymnastics ===
The Lady Cats gymnastics team won back-to-back state championships four years. Members from both the women's and men's teams were selected for the Texas National Team, with the women (led by Central coach Tony Walker) winning the national championship. The Bobcats won the Texas State Championship in 1974, 1976, 1978, 1983, 1987, 2001, and 2015. The Lady Cats won the Texas State Championship in 1989, 2006, 2007, 2008, 2009, 2013, 2014, 2015 and 2019.

=== Tennis ===
The Bobcats' tennis team finished the 2009 season ranked 15th by the Texas Tennis Coaches Association.

=== Volleyball ===
The Lady Cats volleyball team finished its 2007 season ranked 22nd by the Texas Girls Coaches Association. After 22 years of coaching, Central High School girls volleyball coach Connie Bozarth reached a milestone 500 wins on September 16, 2008. Central's overall record is 32-10 (13-5 for 2008 season) and has been a regional qualifier for past three years.

=== Cheerleading ===
The Central High School cheerleaders were crowned national champions at the 2008–2009, 2010, and 2011National Association of Cheerleaders Nationals competition. The cheerleaders are coached by Central High School math teacher, and former Bobcat gymnast, Matt Escue (teacher of the year).

=== Baseball ===
The baseball program at Central won the district title in 2017 (1st in over 30 years). The first district championship was won in 1976 coached by Harvey Reeves.

=== Football ===
Central High School Bobcats football had its heyday from the 1940s through the 1970s under head coaches Jewell Wallace, Bob Harrell, Emory Bellard, Dan Lagrasta, and Smitty Hill, winning state championships in 1943 (open class) and 1966 (Conference 4A, the largest classification at the time). Traditionally, Central competed with Odessa High, Odessa Permian, Midland High, Midland Lee, Abilene, and Abilene Cooper in UIL District 4-5A (District 3-4A until 1979), a grouping popularly known as the 'Little Southwest Conference' due to the extremely high standard of football exhibited by the district's schools. After the 1997 season, the Bobcats were moved away from the LSC into District 2-5A with teams from Lubbock and Amarillo.

Beginning with the 2008–2009 academic year, the Bobcats, along with five of its newer Panhandle rivals, were to rejoin the four Odessa and Midland schools in an enlarged 10-team District 2-5A. Central's first season in the new district garnered them an 0–10 record for the season. On January 20, 2009, SAISD formally approved Brent Davis, from Alice in South Texas, as the new head football coach. Davis' offensive and defensive coordinators from Alice were expected to be hired as Central assistant coaches. Davis finished his first season with a 2–8 record, obtaining the two wins in the last two weeks of the season against Lubbock Coronado and Amarillo Tascosa. The two wins ended a 21-game losing streak that extended into the end of the 2007 season. The Bobcats, in 2010, reached the playoffs. They entered with a 4–6 record, winning their first game against El Paso Franklin before falling at home to Martin High School. In 2011, the Bobcats won their first undisputed district title for the first time since 1963. They finished the regular season with a record of 8–2.

==== Coaching history ====
Years	Coach	Record	Percentage	Notes
2024–Present	Mark Smith	12-10	.545	
2021-2023	Kevin Crane	10-22	.454	Coach Kevin Crane's final season ended with a record of 1-9.
2009–2020	Brent Davis	55-29	.655	
2006–2008	Steve Heryford	11-22	.333	
2003–2005	Bob Bellard	19-17	.528	
2000–2002	Kyle Gandy	9-22	.290	
1996–1999	Gary Gaines	14-28	.333	
1989–1995	Dan Gandy	36-37-5	.494	
1979–1988	Jimmie Keeling	59-44-3	.573	
1972–1978	Smitty Hill	49-20-1	.707	
1967–1971	Dan Lagrasta	33-16-1	.670	
1960–1966	Emory Bellard	59-19-2	.750	
1953–1959	Bob Harrell	41-24-5	.621	
1946–1952	Pete Sikes	1-19*	.050*	
1943–1945	Jewell Wallace	?-?	.000	
		338-277-17	.535	

*record only 1951 and '52.
Source: ""Little SWC" composite football coaching records 1951-present". FridayNightHistory.com. Archived from the original on October 11, 2007.

=== Marching Band ===
Central has an important history of band program. Central has a marching band larger than most other 6A sized schools, with Permian being one of the few schools with a bigger band.

=== Indoor Percussion ===
Central High Indoor Percussion (CHIP) is an indoor marching percussion ensemble competing in Percussion Scholastic A Class across Winter Guard International (WGI) and the North Texas Colorguard Association circuits.

In 2026, CHIP won the WGI Dallas Regional+ Competition in Percussion Scholastic A Class. They also won the NTCA State Championships for Percussion Scholastic A. They competed in WGI World Championships in Dayton, Ohio and returned as a finalist in 15th place in Percussion Scholastic A.

== Fine arts ==
=== Theatre ===
The Central High School theatre department presents two mainstages a year and a presentation of their UIL One Act Competition piece in the late spring.

The students involved in the department attend a yearly state thespian festival where the department had earned many honors such as "All-Star Troupe" and has had students compete at the international level in Monologues, Solo Musical, and Theatrical Marketing.

== Notable alumni ==
- Kristopher Carter, composer, won an Emmy award for his work on the animated series Batman Beyond.
- Ashley Edwards, flag football player
- David Hulse played for the Texas Rangers and Milwaukee Brewers from 1992 to 1996.
- Trey Lunsford, catcher for the San Francisco Giants, played five total games from 2002 to 2003.
- Davis Martin is a professional baseball pitcher for the Chicago White Sox, and played for the Texas Tech Red Raiders baseball team from 2015-2018.
- Maverick McIvor, quarterback for the Western Kentucky Hilltoppers
- Marc Menchaca, actor, appeared in Ozark and The Outsider.
- Shea Morenz was a quarterback for the Texas Longhorns.
- Fess Parker, actor, portrayed Davy Crockett and Daniel Boone in the respective TV shows.
- August Pfluger is the U.S. representative for Texas's 11th congressional district (2021–)
- Lucy A. Snyder is a science-fiction author.
- Joe Williams was a pro football player
