= Estacado High School =

Estacado Early College High School

Location
- 1504 East Itasca Ave. Lubbock, Texas 79401; United States; 33.60859°N 101.81991°W

Information
- Type: Public magnet
- Motto: Inspire Hope, Build Character, Instill Pride.
- Established: 1967
- School district: Lubbock Independent School District
- Principal: Angelica Wilbanks
- Staff: 66.25 (FTE)
- Grades: 9-12
- Student to teacher ratio: 13.06
- Campus type: Urban
- Colors: Blue and silver
- Athletics: Football, Wrestling (Boys and Girls), Baseball, Basketball (Boys and Girls), Cross Country, Track, Golf, Swimming, Softball
- Mascot: Matador
- Website: www.lubbockisd.org/o/ehs/

Estacado Early College High School is a 4A public high school serving grades 9 through 12 in Lubbock, Texas, (USA). It is part of the Lubbock Independent School District. Estacado is a magnet school, with programs in JROTC. As of August 2016, Estacado High School became Estacado Early College High School, due to the partnership with Texas Tech University. Students, starting in the ninth grade, will be able to earn up to 60 hours of college dual credit hours.

The school was founded in 1967. Estacado's colors are blue and silver and its mascot is the Matador. The school is located in the northeast part of the city, between Mackenzie Park and Lubbock City Park.

== History ==
The school, named after the primarily Quaker settlement Estacado near Lubbock, Texas, opened late in 1967. The first principal was Olan Rice in 1969. The school was designed to accommodate 1,600 students, and was one of the first high schools in Lubbock to serve ninth graders. A $3.8 million facility, it originally included a vocational wing made up of metalworking, woodworking, and automobile body workshops, as well as agriculture and electronics labs. To allow other Lubbock Independent School District students to take advantage of these vocational classes, they were eventually moved to the Advanced Technology Center in central Lubbock. The school implemented several magnet programs unique to its campus, beginning in the late 1990s. These included a medical program, an engineering program, and a criminal justice program which started in 2007.

== Academics ==
Estacado has been named a persistently low-performing school by the United States Department of Education. The school began a Campus Improvement Plan in 2010 with three goals: increasing the daily attendance of the students, meeting state and national educational standards, and better preparing students for college.

== Extracurricular activities ==
Estacado High School offers various extracurricular activities including cheerleading, athletics, National Honor Society, United States Academic Decathlon, Fellowship of Christian Athletes, and Junior Reserve Officers' Training Corps. The school's Academic Decathlon team made it to the state competition every year from 1997 to 2012. In 2009, Estacado was one of three high schools in the city to start a women's wrestling team.

== Jerry Gray Go Center ==
In 2008, the Texas Higher Education Coordinating Board awarded the school a $99,000 grant, along with South Plains College and Texas Tech University, to encourage Estacado High students to go to college. Part of this money was used to create the Estacado High School Jerry Gray Go Center. Jerry Gray is an Estacado alumni and the current defensive back coach of the Minnesota Vikings. The Jerry Gray Foundation now works with Texas Tech University to provide "matching corporate scholarships" to graduating Estacado students planning to attend Texas Tech. The foundation’s mission is to "motivate and empower young men and women with knowledge, financial resources, and the tools needed for achieving a higher education and for being successful in life." It provides guidance to students in different college-related areas including taking standardized testing, applying to schools, and completing financial aid paperwork.

== Notable alumni ==
- A. J. Ramos (2005), baseball pitcher
