= San Angelo Independent School District =

Public school in San Angelo, USA

Address
- 1621 University Ave. San Angelo, Texas, 76904; United States

District information
- Type: Public
- Motto: In Pursuit of Excellence
- Grades: Pre-K through 12
- Established: 1903
- Superintendent: Dr. Christopher Moran
- Deputy superintendent(s): Farrah Gomez
- School board: District 1: Bill Dendle, Treasurer District 2: Karla Cardenas District 3: Taylor Kingman, President District 4: Ami Mizell-Flint, Vice President District 5: Kyle Mills District 6: Gerard Gallegos, Secretary Member At-Large: Pam Duncan
- Schools: Elementary 15, Middle 3, High 2

Students and staff
- Students: 14,400
- Teachers: 1000

Other information
- Website: www.saisd.org

San Angelo Independent School District is a public school district based in San Angelo, Texas, United States.

As of 2025, San Angelo ISD has received a rating of "C" by the Texas Education Agency.

== Schools ==
San Angelo ISD has 22 schools serving students Pre-K through 12th grade including one 5A (4A beginning in fall 2018) and one 6A high school, three middle schools, 15 elementary schools, and two alternative campuses. SAISD also serves children birth through age five at three Head Start/Early Head Start centers.

=== High schools ===
- Central High School (Grades 9–12) (Website)
  - Purple Star Designation Campus
- Lake View High School (Grades 9–12) (Website)

=== Middle schools ===
- Lincoln Middle School (grades 6–8) (Website)
- Glenn Middle School (grades 6–8) (Website)
  - Purple Star Designation Campus
- Lone Star Middle School (grades 6–8) (Website)

=== Elementary schools ===
- Grades PK-5
  - Bradford Elementary School (Website)
  - Fannin Elementary School (Website)
  - Glenmore Elementary School (Website)
    - Purple Star Designation Campus
  - McGill Elementary School (Website)
  - Reagan Elementary School (Website)
- Grades K-5
  - Belaire Elementary School (Website)
    - Purple Star Designation Campus
  - Bonham Elementary School (Website)
  - Bowie Elementary School (Website)
  - Crockett Elementary School (Website)
  - Fort Concho Elementary School (Website)
  - Goliad Elementary School (Website)
  - Holiman Elementary School (Website)
  - Lamar Elementary School (Website)
  - Santa Rita Elementary School (Website)

=== Alternative schools ===
- Carver Learning Center (Grades 1–12) - Carver Learning Center is a disciplinary alternative education program for students who have been withdrawn from his/her home campus for infractions to school code of conduct. Teachers work to help the students get caught up with or maintain his/her grade level and build foundation skills to enable the student to succeed academically when he/she returns to his/her home campus. (Website)
- PAYS - PAYS is an academic alternative school for non-traditional students motivated to complete their high school diploma but are enduring extenuating circumstances that pose as obstacles to their academic success. PAYS is a self-paced, web-based program providing students the opportunity to accrue credits to progress to graduation. (Website)
