= List of Texas Tech Red Raiders basketball seasons =

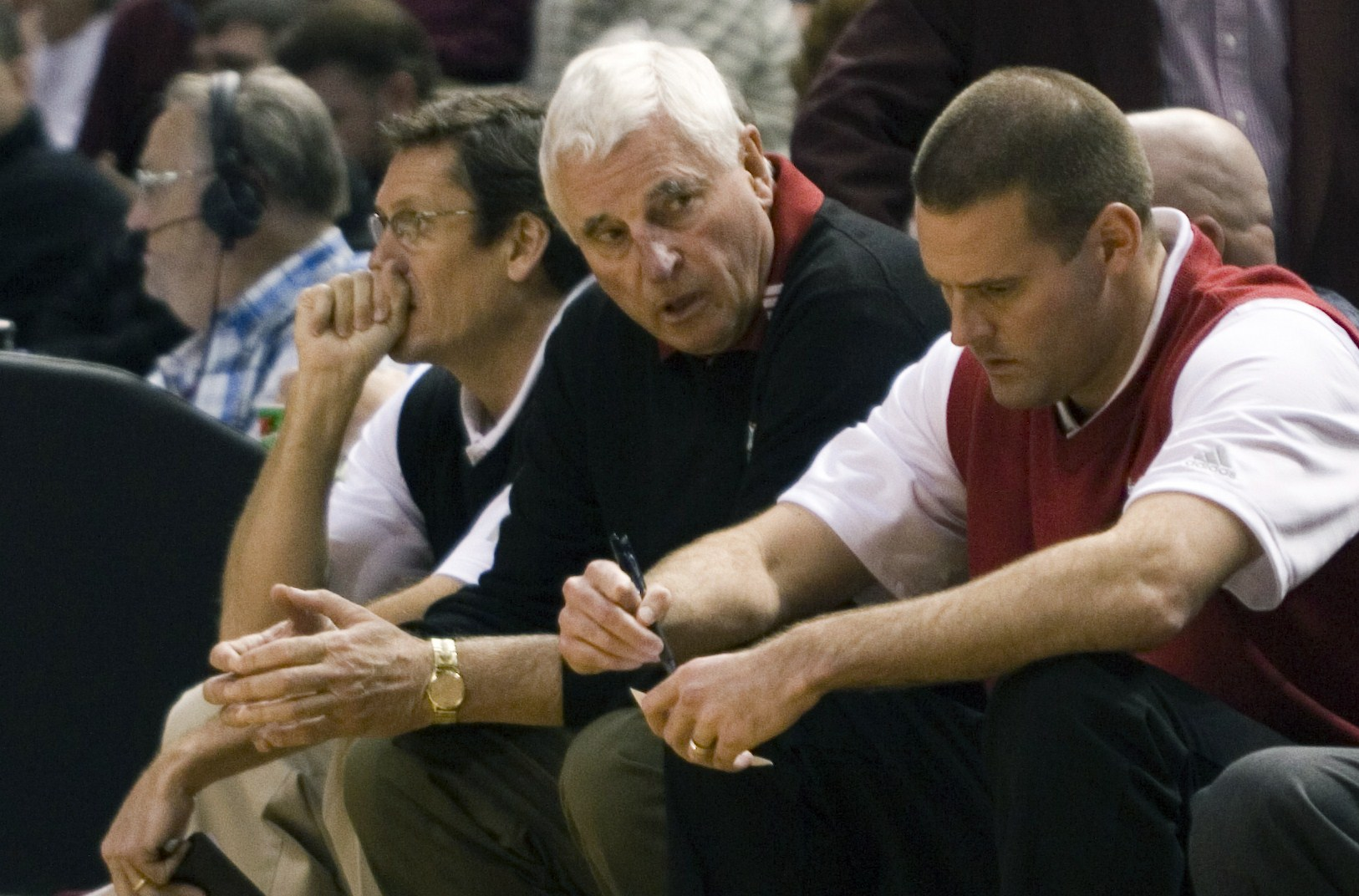
Former Red Raiders head coaches Bob Knight (center right) and Pat Knight (far right)

The Texas Tech Red Raiders college basketball team competes in the National Collegiate Athletic Association's (NCAA) Division I, representing Texas Tech University in the South Division of the Big 12 Conference. Texas Tech has played its home games at United Spirit Arena in Lubbock, Texas since its opening in 1999.

Texas Tech (then known as Texas Technological College) fielded its first intercollegiate men's basketball team during the 1925–26 season. The school's athletics teams were known as the "Matadors" from 1925 to 1936, to reflect the influence of the Spanish Renaissance architecture on campus. In 1932, Texas Tech was admitted to the Border Intercollegiate Athletic Association, also known as the Border Conference. In the team's first season of conference play, Texas Tech went undefeated, winning the first of three consecutive Border Conference championships. At the beginning of the 1937–38 season, Texas Tech's short-lived Matadors moniker was replaced officially with "Red Raiders", the nickname the team has today. Texas Tech received their first postseason bid in 1942 to the National Association of Intercollegiate Basketball (NAIB) tournament. Before withdrawing from the Border Conference in 1956, the Red Raiders won five conference championships and one co-championship.

In 1957, Texas Tech was admitted to the Southwest Conference (SWC), in which it experienced similar success as it had in the Border Conference. In the regular season, the Red Raiders won four conference championships and three conference co-championships. At the end of the 1976 regular season, the Southwest Conference began an annual conference tournament known as the SWC Classic. Texas Tech won five SWC Classic titles in their six appearances in the conference tournament championship game. The university remained in the SWC until the conference ceased operations in 1996, when the Red Raiders ended the 1995–96 season ranked #8 in both the AP (Associated Press) Poll and Coaches' Poll. Following the dissolution of the SWC, the university became a charter member in the South Division of the Big 12 Conference. Since joining the Big 12 Conference, the Red Raiders did not receive a bid to postseason play until 2002, when Hall of Fame coach Bob Knight was hired. During Knight's six-year tenure, Texas Tech received five postseason bids, participating in four NCAA tournaments and one National Invitation Tournament (NIT). The Red Raiders won the third place playoff in the 2003 NIT tournament, the farthest a Red Raiders basketball team has advanced in postseason play before Chris Beard lead the team to 2019 NCAA Division I Men's Basketball Championship Game.

== Seasons ==
Statistics overview
Season	Coach	Overall	Conference	Standing	Postseason
Grady Higginbotham (Independent) (1925–1927)
1925–26	Grady Higginbotham	6–8			
1926–27	Grady Higginbotham	8–10			
Victor Payne (Independent) (1927–1930)
1927–28	Victor Payne	9–7			
1928–29	Victor Payne	9–8			
1929–30	Victor Payne	13–6			
W. L. Golightly (Independent) (1930–1931)
1930–31	W. L. Golightly	11–9			
Dell Morgan (Independent) (1931–1932)
1931–32	Dell Morgan	9–14			
Dell Morgan (Border Conference) (1932–1934)
1932–33	Dell Morgan	13–9	4–0	1st	
1933–34	Dell Morgan	18–5	7–1	1st	
Virgil Ballard (Border Conference) (1934–1935)
1934–35	Virgil Ballard	15–9	9–1	1st	
Berl Huffman (Border Conference) (1935–1939)
1935–36	Berl Huffman	14–6	8–6	3rd	
1936–37	Berl Huffman	18–7	11–5	2nd	
1937–38	Berl Huffman	9–13	7–7	T–3rd	
1938–39	Berl Huffman	13–6	13–5	2nd	
Berl Huffman (Independent) (1939–1941)
1939–40	Berl Huffman	21–7			
1940–41	Berl Huffman	19–6			
Berl Huffman (Border Conference) (1941–1942)
1941–42	Berl Huffman	16–11	12–4	2nd	
Polk Robison (Border Conference) (1942–1946)
1942–43	Polk Robison	13–11	4–5	3rd	
1943–44	Polk Robison	5–18	0–3	2nd	
1944–45	Polk Robison	10-14	7–6	5th	
1945–46	Polk Robison	15–10	7–4	3rd	
Berl Huffman (Border Conference) (1946–1947)
1946–47	Berl Huffman	10–12	8–8	T–5th	
Polk Robison (Border Conference) (1947–1956)
1947–48	Polk Robison	16–12	10–6	2nd	
1948–49	Polk Robison	21–9	11–5		
1949–50	Polk Robison	14–12	8–8		
1950–51	Polk Robison	14–14	10–6	3rd	
1951–52	Polk Robison	14–10	9–5	3rd	
1952–53	Polk Robison	12–10	9–5	4th	
1953–54	Polk Robison	20–5	11–1	1st	NCAA first round
1954–55	Polk Robison	18–7	9–3	T–1st	
1955–56	Polk Robison	13–12	8–4	1st	NCAA first round
Polk Robison (Independent) (1956–1957)
1956–57	Polk Robison	12–11			
Polk Robison (Southwest Conference) (1957–1961)
1957–58	Polk Robison	15–8	8–6	T—3rd	
1958–59	Polk Robison	15–9	8–6	3rd	
1959–60	Polk Robison	10–14	7–7	T–4th	
1960–61	Polk Robison	15–10	11–3	1st	NCAA University Division Sweet Sixteen
Gene Gibson (Southwest Conference) (1961–1969)
1961–62	Gene Gibson	19–8	11–3	T–1st	NCAA University Division Sweet Sixteen
1962–63	Gene Gibson	6–17	6–8	T–5th	
1963–64	Gene Gibson	16–7	11–3	2nd	
1964–65	Gene Gibson	17–6	12–2	T–1st	
1965–66	Gene Gibson	13–11	8–6	3rd	
1966–67	Gene Gibson	9–15	7–7	5th	
1967–68	Gene Gibson	9–15	5–9	T–7th	
1968–69	Gene Gibson	11–13	6–8	T–4th	
Bob Bass (Southwest Conference) (1969–1971)
1969–70	Bob Bass	14–10	8–6	T–3rd	
1970–71	Bob Bass; Gerald Myers	16–10^{[Note A]}	9–5^{[Note A]}	T–3rd	
Gerald Myers (Southwest Conference) (1971–1991)
1971–72	Gerald Myers	14–12	8–6	5th	
1972–73	Gerald Myers	19–8	12–2	1st	NCAA University Division first round
1973–74	Gerald Myers	17–9	10–4	2nd	
1974–75	Gerald Myers	18–8	11–3	T–2nd	
1975–76	Gerald Myers	25–6	13–3	2nd	NCAA Division I Sweet Sixteen
1976–77	Gerald Myers	20–9	12–4	3rd	
1977–78	Gerald Myers	19–10	10–6	4th	
1978–79	Gerald Myers	19–11	9–7	T–4th	NIT first round
1979–80	Gerald Myers	16–13	8–8	T–4th	
1980–81	Gerald Myers	15–13	8–8	T–4th	
1981–82	Gerald Myers	17–11	8–8	6th	
1982–83	Gerald Myers	12–19	7–9	6th	
1983–84	Gerald Myers	17–12	10–6	4th	
1984–85	Gerald Myers	23–8	12–4	1st	NCAA Division I first round
1985–86	Gerald Myers	17–14	9–7	5th	NCAA Division I first round
1986–87	Gerald Myers	15–14	9–7	T–3rd	
1987–88	Gerald Myers	9–19	4–12	T–7th	
1988–89	Gerald Myers	13–15	8–8	T–4th	
1989–90	Gerald Myers	5–22	0–16	9th	
1990–91	Gerald Myers	8–23	4–12	T–7th	
James Dickey (Southwest Conference) (1991–1996)
1991–92	James Dickey	15–14	6–8	5th	
1992–93	James Dickey	18–12	6–8	5th	NCAA Division I first round
1993–94	James Dickey	17–11	10–4	T–2nd	
1994–95	James Dickey	20–10	11–3	T–1st	NIT first round
1995–96	James Dickey	30–2^{[Note B]}	14–0	1st	NCAA Division I Sweet Sixteen
James Dickey (Big 12 Conference) (1996–2001)
1996–97	James Dickey	19–9^{[Note C]}	10–6^{[Note C]}	T–3rd	
1997–98	James Dickey	13–14	7–9	T–7th	
1998–99	James Dickey	13–17	5–11	11th	
1999–00	James Dickey	12–16	3–13	12th	
2000–01	James Dickey	9–19	3–13	12th	
Bob Knight (Big 12 Conference) (2001–2008)
2001–02	Bob Knight	23–9	10–6	T–3rd	NCAA Division I first round
2002–03	Bob Knight	22–13	6–10	T–7th	NIT Third Place
2003–04	Bob Knight	23–11	9–7	T–5th	NCAA Division I second round
2004–05	Bob Knight	22–11	10–6	4th	NCAA Division I Sweet Sixteen
2005–06	Bob Knight	15–17	6–10	T–7th	
2006–07	Bob Knight	21–13	9–7	5th	NCAA Division I first round
2007–08	Bob Knight	16–15^{[Note D]}	7–9^{[Note D]}	T–7th	
Pat Knight (Big 12 Conference) (2008–2011)
2008–09	Pat Knight	14–19	3–13	11th	
2009–10	Pat Knight	19–16	4–12	T–9th	NIT Quarterfinal
2010–11	Pat Knight	13–19	5–11	T–10th	
Billy Gillispie (Big 12 Conference) (2011–2012)
2011–12	Billy Gillispie	8–23	1–17	10th	
Chris Walker (Big 12 Conference) (2012–2013)
2012–13	Chris Walker	11–20	3–15	9th	
Tubby Smith (Big 12 Conference) (2013–2016)
2013–14	Tubby Smith	14–18	6–12	9th	
2014–15	Tubby Smith	13–19	3–15	10th	
2015–16	Tubby Smith	19–13	9–9	7th	NCAA Division I first round
Chris Beard (Big 12 Conference) (2016–2021)
2016–17	Chris Beard	18–14	6–12	T–7th	
2017–18	Chris Beard	27–10	11–7	T–2nd	NCAA Division I Elite Eight
2018–19	Chris Beard	31–7	14–4	T–1st	NCAA Division I Runner-up
2019–20	Chris Beard	18–13	9–9	T–3rd	No postseason held
2020–21	Chris Beard	18–11	9–8	T–6th	NCAA Division I second round
Mark Adams (Big 12 Conference) (2021–2023)
2021–22	Mark Adams	23–8	12–6	3rd	NCAA Division I Sweet Sixteen
2022–23	Mark Adams	16–16	5–13	9th	
Grant McCasland (Big 12 Conference) (2023–present)
2023–24	Grant McCasland	23–11	11–7	T–3rd	NCAA Division I first round
2024–25	Grant McCasland	28–9	15–5	2nd	NCAA Division I Elite Eight
2025–26	Grant McCasland	23–11	12–6	T–3rd	NCAA Division I second round
Total:		1,559–1,182			
National champion Postseason invitational champion Conference regular season champion Conference regular season and conference tournament champion Division regular season champion Division regular season and conference tournament champion Conference tournament champion

^A. Bass resigned after the first 13 games of the 1970–71 season, going 8–5 and 1–0 in conference. Gerald Myers was named interim head coach for final 13 games, going 8–5 and 8–5 in conference.
^B. Texas Tech vacated its 1996 NCAA tournament appearance due to ineligible players; official record is 28–1.
^C. Texas Tech forfeited its entire 1996–97 conference slate due to ineligible players, but Dickey was ruled not to have been affected.
^D. Bob Knight resigned after 20 games, going 12–8 and 3–3 in conference. Pat Knight took over, going 4–7 and 4–6 in conference.
