= List of sportspeople educated at Texas Tech University =

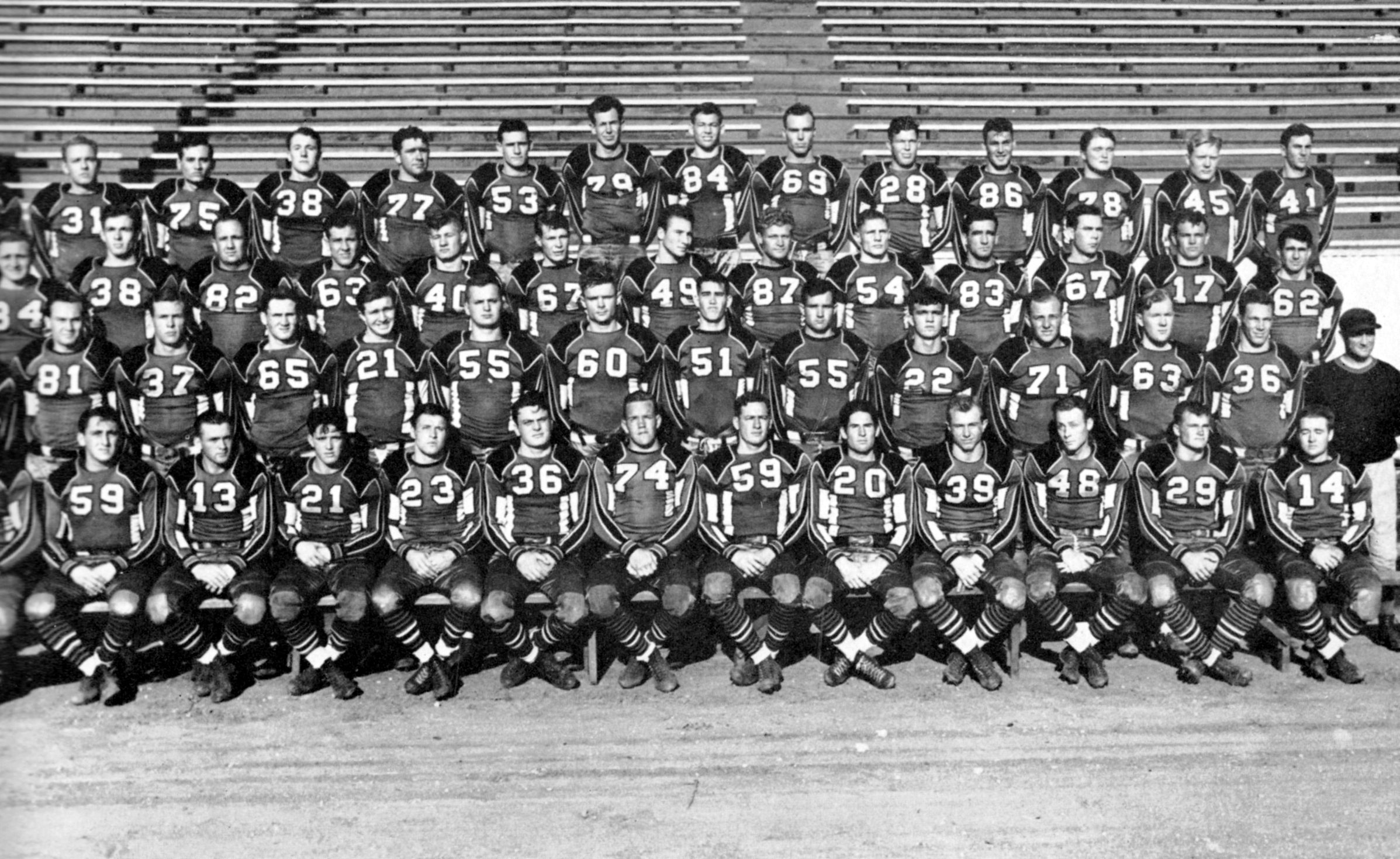
The 1939 Texas Tech Red Raiders football team

Texas Tech University, often referred to as Texas Tech or TTU, is a public, coeducational, research university located in Lubbock, Texas. Established on February 10, 1923, and originally known as Texas Technological College, the university is the leading institution of the Texas Tech University System and has the seventh largest student body in the state of Texas. It is the only school in Texas to house an undergraduate institution, law school, and medical school at the same location. Initial enrollment in 1925 was 910 students; as of fall 2010, the university had 31,637 students from more than 110 countries, all 50 U.S. states and the District of Columbia. Since the university's first graduating class in 1927 of 26 students, it has awarded more than 220,000 degrees, including 47,000 graduate and professional degrees. The Texas Tech Alumni Association, with over 27,000 members, operates more than 120 chapters in cities throughout the United States and the world.

Since 1996, Texas Tech University has sponsored fifteen varsity teams that compete in nine sports: American football, baseball, basketball, cross country running, golf, soccer, softball, tennis, track and field, and volleyball. When the university opened for the 1925–26 academic year, three varsity teams, baseball, men's basketball, and football, were fielded during that season. Gene Alford, who began playing for the Portsmouth Spartans in 1931, was the first Texas Tech alumnus to play in a professional league. Many more Texas Tech alumni have become professional athletes and coaches in sports leagues, including Major League Baseball (MLB), the National Basketball Association (NBA), the National Football League (NFL), and the Women's National Basketball Association (WNBA).

Several Texas Tech Red Raiders have been honored for both their collegiate and professional achievements. Collegially, six position awards have been awarded to seven Red Raiders. The Doak Walker Award, honoring the top college football running back, was presented to Bam Morris in 1993 and to Byron Hanspard in 1996. The Sammy Baugh Trophy, honoring the top college football passer, was presented to Kliff Kingsbury in 2002, B. J. Symons in 2003, and Graham Harrell in 2007. Harrell also received the Johnny Unitas Golden Arm Award, honoring the most outstanding senior quarterback in college football, in 2008. Wes Welker received the Mosi Tatupu Award, presented to the special teams player of the year from 1997 to 2006, in 2003. In 2007, Michael Crabtree received the Fred Biletnikoff Award and Paul Warfield Award, honoring the top college football receiver. The following season, Crabtree received both awards again, becoming the only player to win either award more than once. Four Red Raiders, Donny Anderson, Hub Bechtol, E. J. Holub, and Dave Parks, have been named to the College Football Hall of Fame. (Note: Hub Bechtol was inducted into the College Football Hall of Fame as both a member of the Texas Tech Red Raiders and the Texas Longhorns.) Three-time Olympic gold medalist and three-time WNBA Most Valuable Player Sheryl Swoopes was the first player signed by the WNBA. Professionally, football coaches Carl Madison and John Parchman were named High School Football Coach of the Year by USA Today in 1988 and 1999 respectively.

== Alumni ==
- "—" indicates that class year is unknown.
- To sort these tables by alumni or class year, click on the icon next to the column title.

=== Athletics ===
List of Texas Tech University athletics alumni
Alumnus	Class year	Notability	Refs
Leigh Daniel	—	National Collegiate Athletic Association championship track athlete; Ashland University women's cross country head coach	
Sally Kipyego	—	National Collegiate Athletic Association championship cross country and track athlete; World Championships silver medalist; Olympic silver medalist	
Jason Young	2004	2012 USA Olympian, 2011 World Championships, 2010 World Cup competitor	

=== Baseball ===
List of Texas Tech University baseball alumni
Alumnus	Class year	Notability	Refs
Gary Ashby	1977	Texas Tech Red Raiders head coach (1984–1986)	
Doug Ault	1972	Major League Baseball player (1976–1978, 1980)	
Josh Bard	1999	Major League Baseball player (2002–present)	
Dallas Braden	2004	Major League Baseball player (2007–present)	
Mark Brandenburg	1992	Major League Baseball player (1995–1997)	
Stubby Clapp	1996	Major League Baseball player (2001); Tri-City ValleyCats manager (2011–present)	
Joe Dillon	1997	Major League Baseball player (2005, 2007–2009)	
Travis Driskill	1993	Major League Baseball player (2002–2005, 2007)	
Keith Ginter	1998	Major League Baseball player (2000–2005)	
Donald Harris	1989	Major League Baseball player (1991–1993)	
Chuck Harrison	1962	Major League Baseball player (1965–1967, 1969, 1971)	
Mike Humphreys	1988	Major League Baseball player (1991–1993)	
Colt Hynes	2007	Minor League Baseball player (2007–present)	
Nathan Karns	2009	Major League Baseball player (2013–present)	
Jeff Karstens	2003	Major League Baseball player (2006–present)	
Brandon Kolb	1995	Major League Baseball player (2000–2001)	
Trey Lunsford	2000	Major League Baseball player (2002–2003)	
Matt Miller	1996	Major League Baseball player (2001–2002)	
Ryan Nye	1995	Major League Baseball player (1997–1998)	
Dustin Richardson	2006	Major League Baseball player (2009–2010)	
Chris Sampson	1999	Major League Baseball player (2006–2010)	
Travis Smith	1995	Major League Baseball player (1998, 2002, 2004–2006)	
Dan Spencer	1987	Green River Gators head coach (1992–1996); Texas Tech Red Raiders head coach (2009–2012)	
Zachary Stewart	2008	Minor League Baseball player (2008–present)	
Josh Tomlin	2006	Major League Baseball player (2010–present)	
Steve Watkins	1998	Major League Baseball player (2004)	

=== Basketball ===
List of Texas Tech University basketball alumni
Alumnus	Class year	Notability	Refs
Tony Battie	1997	National Basketball Association player (1997/98–2011/12)	
Tony Benford	1986	North Texas Mean Green men's basketball head coach (2012/13–2016/17)	
Gary Blair	1972 (BPE), 1974 (M.Ed.)	Stephen F. Austin Ladyjacks head coach (1985/86–1992/93); Arkansas Lady Razorbacks head coach (1993/94–2002/03); Texas A&M Aggies women's basketball head coach (2003/04–present)	
Angie Braziel	1999	Women's National Basketball Association player (1999–2001)	
Rick Bullock	1976	National Basketball Association player (1976)	
Cory Carr	1998	American-Israeli National Basketball Association player (1998/99–2000/01)	
Mark Davis	1995	National Basketball Association player (1995/96)	
Keitha Dickerson	2000	Women's National Basketball Association player (2001–2002)	
Andre Emmett	2003	National Basketball Association player (2004/05)	
Gene Gibson	1950	Texas Tech Red Raiders head coach (1961–1969)	
Darvin Ham	1996	National Basketball Association player (1996/97–2004/05)	
Dusty Hannahs	2014	Israeli Basketball Premier League player (2024–present)	
Geoff Huston	1979	National Basketball Association player (1979/80–1986/87)	
Gerald Myers	1959 (B.Ed.), 1965 (M.S.)	Texas Tech Red Raiders head coach (1971/72–1990/91); Texas Tech University director of athletics (1996–2011)	
Paul Nolen	1953	National Basketball Association player (1953/54)	
Jia Perkins	2004	Women's National Basketball Association player (2004–2017)	
Plenette Pierson	2003	Women's National Basketball Association player (2003–2017)	
Kasib Powell	2002	National Basketball Association player (2007/08)	
Polk Robison	1934	Texas Tech Red Raiders head coach (1942/43–1945/46, 1947/48–1960/61); Texas Tech University Director of Athletics (1960–1970)	
Jason Sasser	1996	National Basketball Association player (1996/97, 1998/99)	
Sam Sibert	1970	National Basketball Association player (1972/73)	
Sheryl Swoopes	1993	Olympic Games Women's Basketball gold medalist (1996, 2000, 2004); Women's National Basketball Association player (1997–2000, 2002–2008, 2011–present)	
Jeff Taylor	1982	National Basketball Association player (1982/83, 1986/87)	
Alicia Thompson	1998	Women's National Basketball Association player (1998, 2000–2002, 2004–2005)	
Robert Turner (basketball)	2015	Israeli Basketball Premier League player (2026-present)	

- Kyler Edwards (born 1999), basketball player in the Israeli Basketball Premier League
- Keenan Evans (born 1996), basketball player in the Israel Basketball Premier League
- Terran Petteway (born 1992), basketball player in the Israeli Basketball Premier League

=== Football ===
List of Texas Tech University football alumni
Alumnus	Class year	Notability	Refs
Gene Alford	1925	National Football League player (1931–1934)	
Rodney Allison	1977	Chattanooga Mocs head coach (2003–2008)	
Danny Amendola	2007	National Football League player (2009–present)	
Glen Amerson	1960	National Football League player (1961)	
Donny Anderson	1965	National Football League player (1966–1974); College Football Hall of Fame inductee (1989)	
Hasson Arbubakrr	1982	National Football League player (1983–1984)	
Elmer Arterburn	1951	National Football League player (1954)	
Dek Bake	2006	Canadian Football League player (2008)	
Tim Baker	2000	National Football League player (2001, 2003)	
Joe Barnes	1973	National Football League player (1974)	
Baron Batch	2010	National Football League player (2011–present)	
Winford Baze	1935	National Football League player (1937)	
Hub Bechtol	1943	All-America Football Conference player (1947–1949); College Football Hall of Fame inductee (1991)	
Bront Bird	2010	National Football League player (2011)	
Rodney Blackshear	1991	CenTex Barracudas head coach (2006); Lubbock Renegades head coach (2007–2008); South Georgia Wildcats head coach (2009); Abilene Ruff Riders head coach (2010); Amarillo Venom head coach (2011)	
Art Briles	1979	Houston Cougars head coach (2003–2007); Baylor Bears head coach (2008–2015)	
Buddy Brothers	1930	Tulsa Golden Hurricane head coach (1946–1952)	
Jamall Broussard	2000	National Football League player (2004), Canadian Football League player (2007), and Arena Football League player (2008)	
Bob Bryant	—	All-America Football Conference player (1946–1949)	
Maury Buford	1981	National Football League player (1982–1991)	
Jim Callahan	1942	National Football League player (1946)	
Brandon Carter	2009	National Football League player (2010–present)	
Carl Carter	1985	National Football League player (1986–1992)	
Marcus Coleman	1995	National Football League player (1996–2006)	
Michael Crabtree	2008	Fred Biletnikoff Award recipient (2007, 2008); Paul Warfield Award recipient (2007, 2008); National Football League player (2009–present)	
Sonny Cumbie	2004	Arena Football League player (2006–2008); San Angelo Stampede Express head coach (2009); Texas Tech Red Raiders assistant coach (2010–2013)	
Raymond A. Curfman	1937	New Mexico State Aggies head coach (1946–1947); Idaho Vandals head coach (1951–1953)	
Kevin Curtis	2001	NFL Europa player (2006–2007); Louisiana Tech Bulldogs assistant coach (2010–present)	
Stan David	1983	National Football League player (1984)	
Gaines Davis	—	National Football League player (1936)	
Keyunta Dawson	2006	National Football League player (2007–present)	
Derek Dorris	2000	National Football League Player (2002)	
Tommy Duniven	1976	National Football League Player (1977)	
Sonny Dykes	1993	Louisiana Tech Bulldogs head coach (2010–present)	
Ralph Earhart	1948	National Football League player (1948–1949)	
Samuel Eguavoen	—	Canadian Football League player (2016–present)	
Lin Elliott	1991	National Football League player (1992–1995)	
Eric Everett	1987	National Football League player (1988–1992)	
Eric Felton	1977	National Football League player (1978–1980)	
Joel Filani	2006	United Football League player (2009); Arena Football League player (2010–present)	
Bob Flowers	—	National Football League player (1942–1949)	
Larry Flowers	1979	National Football League player (1981–1985)	
Carlos Francis	2003	National Football League player (2004)	
Dylan Gandy	2004	National Football League player (2005–present)	
Roger Gill	1963	National Football League player (1964–1965)	
James Hadnot	1979	National Football League player (1980–1983); United States Football League player (1985)	
Joselio Hanson	2002	National Football League player (2004, 2006–present); NFL Europe player (2005)	
Byron Hanspard	1996	Doak Walker Award recipient (1996); National Football League player (1997, 1999)	
Graham Harrell	2008	Johnny Unitas Golden Arm Award recipient (2008); Sammy Baugh Trophy recipient (2008); National Football League player (2010–present)	
Leonard Harris	1983	National Football League player (1986–1994)	
Bill Herchman	1955	National Football League player (1956–1962)	
Cody Hodges	2005	AF2 player (2006–2007)	
Pat Holmes	1961	Canadian Football League player (1962–1965); American Football League player (1966–1969); National Football League player (1970–1973)	
E. J. Holub	1960	American Football League player (1961–1970); College Football Hall of Fame inductee (1986)	
Thomas Howard	1976	National Football League player (1977–1985)	
Aaron Hunt	2002	Canadian Football League player (2006–present)	
Anthony Hutchison	1982	National Football League player (1983–1985)	
Charles Jackson	1985	National Football League player (1987)	
Glenn January	2006	Canadian Football League player (2007–present)	
Dwayne Jiles	1984	National Football League player (1985–1989)	
Curtis Jordan	1975	National Football League player (1976–1986)	
Bill Kelley	1948	National Football League player (1949)	
Bob Kilcullen	1956	National Football League player (1957–1958, 1960–1966)	
Kliff Kingsbury	2002	Sammy Baugh Trophy recipient (2002); National Football League player (2005); Canadian Football League player (2006–2007); Houston Cougars assistant coach (2010–2011); Texas A&M Aggies offensive coordinator (2012); Texas Tech Red Raiders head coach (2013–2018); Arizona Cardinals head coach (2019–present)	
Kris Kocurek	2000	National Football League player (2002); Detroit Lions assistant coach (2009–present)	
Devin Lemons	2000	National Football League player (2004)	
Zebbie Lethridge	1997	National Football League player (2001)	
Daniel Loper	2004	National Football League player (2006–present)	
Anthony Lynn	1991	National Football League player (1993, 1995–1999); National Football League assistant coach (2000–2017); Los Angeles Chargers head coach (2017–present)	
Carl Madison	—	USA Today High School Football Coach of the Year (1988)	
Patrick Mahomes	2016	3x Super Bowl champion (LIV, LVII, LVIII), 3x Super Bowl MVP (LIV, LVII, LVIII), 2x NFL MVP (2018, 2022), NFL Offensive Player of the Year (2018), 2x First-team All-Pro (2018, 2022), 5x Pro Bowler (2018, 2019, 2020, 2021, 2022)	
Anthony Malbrough	1999	National Football League player (2000); NFL Europe player (2001); Canadian Football League player (2002–2009)	
Darcel McBath	2008	National Football League player (2009–present)	
Anthony McDowell	1991	National Football League player (1992–1994)	
Edward McKeever	1934	Notre Dame Fighting Irish head coach (1944); Cornell Big Red head coach (1945–1946); San Francisco Dons head coach (1947); Chicago Rockets head coach (1948)	
Derrell Mitchell	1993	National Football League player (1994); World League player (1995); Canadian Football League player (1997–2007)	
Roland Mitchell	1986	National Football League player (1987–1994)	
Mike Mock	1977	National Football League player (1978)	
Ed Mooney	1967	National Football League player (1968–1971, 1973)	
Bam Morris	1993	Doak Walker Award recipient (1993); National Football League player (1994–1999); National Indoor Football League player (2006)	
Eric Morris	2008	Canadian Football League player (2009)	
Sammy Morris	1999	National Football League player (2000–present)	
Roland Nabors	1947	All-America Football Conference player (1948)	
John Parchman	—	USA Today High School Football Coach of the Year (1999)	
Dave Parks	1963	National Football League player (1964–1973); College Football Hall of Fame inductee (2008)	
Mac Percival	—	National Football League player (1967–1974)	
Manny Ramirez	2006	National Football League player (2007–present)	
Herschel Ramsey	1937	National Football League player (1938–1940, 1945)	
Tate Randle	1981	National Football League player (1982–1987)	
Walt Rankin	1938	National Football League player (1941, 1943–1947)	
Montae Reagor	1998	National Football League player (1999–2007)	
Lincoln Riley	2002	USC Trojans head coach (2022–present)	
Gabriel Rivera	1982	National Football League player (1983)	
Don Rives	1972	National Football League player (1973–1978)	
Ed Robnett	1946	All-America Football Conference player (1947)	
Frank Sachse	—	National Football League player (1973–1978)	
Walt Schlinkman	1945	National Football League player (1946–1949)	
Prince Scott	1940	All-America Football Conference player (1946)	
Mike Smith	2004	National Football League player (2005–2006)	
Timmy Smith	1986	National Football League player (1987–1988, 1990)	
Lemuel Stinson	1987	National Football League player (1988–1993)	
B. J. Symons	2003	Sammy Baugh Trophy recipient (2003)	
Billy Taylor	1977	National Football League player (1978–1982)	
Zach Thomas	1995	National Football League player (1996–2008); College Football Hall of Fame inductee (2015), 7x Pro Bowler, 5x First Team All-Pro, 2x Second Team All-Pro, NFL 2000s All-Decade Team, Class of 2023 Pro Football Hall of Fame Inductee	
Andre Tillman	1973	National Football League player (1975–1978)	
Billy Joe Tolliver	1988	National Football League player (1989–1994, 1997–1999)	
Alex Trlica	2007	National Collegiate Athletic Association Division I record holder for most points after touchdowns	
Bake Turner	1961	National Football League player (1962, 1970); American Football League player (1963–1969)	
Louis Vasquez	2008	National Football League player (2009–present)	
Ken Vinyard	1968	National Football League player (1970)	
Sammy Walker	1990	National Football League player (1991–1993)	
Jamar Wall	2009	National Football League player (2010–present)	
Joe Walter	1984	National Football League player (1985–1993, 1995–1997)	
Ted Watts	1980	National Football League player (1981–1985, 1987)	
Wes Welker	2003	Mosi Tatupu Award recipient (2003); National Football League player (2004–present)	
Dixie B. White	1939	Midwestern State Mustangs head coach (1951–1952); Northeast Louisiana Indians head coach (1964–1971)	
Todd Whitten	1990	Tarleton State Texans head coach (1996, 2000–2004); Sam Houston State Bearkats head coach (2005–2009)	
Brandon Williams	2008	National Football League player (2010–present)	
Rex Williams	1939	National Football League player (1940, 1945)	
Ricky Williams	2001	National Football League player (2002–2003)	
Shaud Williams	2000	National Football League player (2004–2006)	
Tom Wilson	1966	Texas A&M Aggies head coach (1978–1981)	
Bernie Winkler	1947	All-America Football Conference player (1948)	

=== Golf ===
List of Texas Tech University golf alumni
Alumnus	Class year	Notability	Refs
Ludvig Aberg	2023	Professional golfer on the PGA Tour	
John Paul Cain	1959	1989 Greater Grand Rapids Open winner; 1992 Ameritech Senior Open winner	
Oscar Florén	2007	Professional golfer on the European Tour	
Jeff Mitchell	1976	Professional golfer; Texas Tech Red Raiders golf head coach (1990–2000); Stanford Cardinal men's golf head coach (2000–2004); North Texas Mean Green women's golf head coach (2008–present)	

=== Volleyball ===
List of Texas Tech University volleyball alumni
Alumnus	Class year	Notability	Refs
Lisa Love	1978	Texas–Arlington Mavericks head coach (1982–1988); USC Trojans head coach (1989–1998); American Volleyball Coaches Association Hall of Fame inductee (2005); Arizona State University athletic director (2005–present)	
