= List of Texas Tech Red Raiders head basketball coaches =

The Texas Tech Red Raiders basketball program competes in the National Collegiate Athletic Association's (NCAA) Division I, representing Texas Tech University in the Big 12 Conference. The program has had 17 head coaches since it began play during the 1925–26 NCAA men's basketball season.

Texas Tech (then known as Texas Technological College) basketball team was formerly named the "Matadors" from 1925 to 1936, to reflect the influence of the Spanish Renaissance architecture on campus. The Matadors' first head coach, Grady Higginbotham, started and led the program until Victor Payne replaced him after two seasons. In 1932, Texas Tech was admitted to the Border Intercollegiate Athletic Association, also known as the Border Conference. In the team's first season of conference play, Texas Tech's fourth head coach, Dell Morgan, went undefeated, winning the first of three consecutive Border Conference championships. At the beginning of the 1937–38 season, Texas Tech's short-lived Matadors moniker was replaced officially with "Red Raiders", the nickname the team has today. Texas Tech received their first postseason bid in 1942 to the National Association of Intercollegiate Basketball (NAIA) tournament during Berl Huffman's final season with the team in his first term as head coach. Huffman's successor, Polk Robison, led Texas Tech to their first NCAA tournament appearance in 1956, the same year Robison began a three-year conference championship winning streak. Before withdrawing from the Border Conference in 1956, the Red Raiders won five conference championships and one co-championship.

In 1957, Texas Tech was admitted to the Southwest Conference (SWC), in which it experienced similar success as it had in the Border Conference. In the regular season, the Red Raiders won four conference championships and three conference co-championships. At the end of the 1976 regular season, the SWC began an annual conference tournament known as the SWC Classic. Texas Tech won five SWC Classic titles in their six appearances in the conference tournament championship game; three under Gerald Myers and two under James Dickey. The university remained in the SWC until the conference ceased operations in 1996, when Dickey's 1995–96 team ended the season ranked eighth in both the Associated Press Poll and Coaches' Poll and won the conference's final regular season and SWC Classic titles. Following the dissolution of the SWC, the university became a charter member in the South Division of the Big 12 Conference. Since joining the Big 12 Conference, the Red Raiders did not receive a bid to postseason play until 2002, when Hall of Fame coach Bob Knight was hired. During Knight's six-year tenure, Texas Tech received five postseason bids, participating in four NCAA tournaments and one National Invitation Tournament (NIT). The Red Raiders won the third place playoff in the 2003 NIT tournament, the farthest a Red Raiders men's basketball team has advanced in postseason play. During the 2007–08 season, Bob Knight resigned as head coach and his son, then assistant head coach, Pat Knight became Texas Tech's 13th head coach. In the 2009–10 season, Pat Knight led the Red Raiders to the (NIT) where they were defeated in the quarterfinals. After failing to make the NCAA tournament, and compiling a 16-42 Big 12 Conference record over his three and a half seasons as head coach, Texas Tech terminated Pat Knight's position has head coach. On March 20, 2011, Texas Tech hired Billy Clyde Gillispie, former head coach of the Kentucky Wildcats, Texas A&M Aggies, and UTEP Miners, as the 14th head coach of the Texas Tech men's basketball program.

== Key ==
General
#	Number of coaches (Note: A running total of the number of head coaches, thus, any coach who have two or more separate terms as head coach is only counted once.)
GC	Games coached
^{†}	Elected to the Basketball Hall of Fame
BT	Basketball Times Coaches of the Year
NCHOF	National Collegiate Basketball Hall of Fame
Border	Border Conference Coach of the Year
SWC	Southwest Conference Coach of the Year
Big 12	Big 12 Conference Coach of the Year

Overall
OW	Wins
OL	Losses
O%	Winning percentage

Conference
CW	Wins
CL	Losses
C%	Winning percentage
RCs	Regular Season Championships (Note: Texas Tech was not in an athletic conference from the 1925 through 1931, 1939 through 1941, the 1943–44 season, and the 1956–57 season.)
TCs	Tournament Championships (Note: The Border Conference did not hold a conference tournament. The Southwest Conference did not hold their conference tournament until the 1975–76 season.)

Postseason (Note: Postseason wins and losses include tournament games played in the National Association of Intercollegiate Basketball (now National Association of Intercollegiate Athletics), National Collegiate Athletic Association (NCAA), and National Invitation Tournament (NIT).)
PW	Wins
PL	Losses

== Coaches ==
Statistics correct as of the end of the 2022–23 NCAA Division I men's basketball season

#	Name	Season(s)	GC	OW	OL	O%	CW	CL	C%	PW	PL	RCs	TCs	Awards
1	Grady Higginbotham	1925–1927	32	14	18	.438	—	—	—	—	—	—	—	—
2	Victor Payne	1927–1930	52	31	21	.596	—	—	—	—	—	—	—	—
3	W. L. Golightly	1930–1931	20	11	9	.550	—	—	—	—	—	—	—	—
4	Dell Morgan	1931–1934	69	42	27	.550	15	1	.938	—	—	2	—	—
5	Virgil Ballard	1934–1935	24	14	10	.583	9	1	.900	—	—	1	—	—
6	Berl Huffman	1935–1942, 1946–1947	188	116	72	.617	56	34	.622	1	1	0	—	—
7	Polk Robison	1943–1946, 1947–1961	443	248	195	.560	141	82	.632	2	4	4	—	Border (1954)
8	Gene Gibson	1961–1969	192	101	91	.526	66	46	.589	1	1	2	—	—
9	Bob Bass	1969–1970	24	14	10	.583	8	6	.571	—	—	0	—	—
10	Gerald Myers	1970–1991	587	326	261	.555	180	142	.559	1	5	2	3	SWC (5x)
11	James Dickey	1991–2001	287	164	123	.571	75	75	.500	2	3	2	2	SWC (1992 & 1996)
12	Bob Knight^{†}	2001–2008	220	138	82	.627	53	49	.520	7	5	0	0	NCHOF (2006)
13	Pat Knight	2008–2011	111	50	61	.450	16	42	.276	2	1	0	0	—
14	Billy Gillispie	2011–2012	31	8	23	.258	1	17	.056	0	0	0	0	—
15	Chris Walker	2012–2013	31	11	20	.355	3	15	.167	0	0	0	0	—
16	Tubby Smith	2013–2016	96	46	50	.479	18	36	.333	0	1	0	0	Big 12 (2016)
17	Chris Beard	2016–2021	167	112	55	.671	49	40	.551	9	3	1	0	Big 12 (2018 & 2019)
18	Mark Adams	2021–2023	68	43	25	.632	17	19	.472	2	1	0	0	—
19	Grant McCasland	2023–Present	71	51	20	.718	26	12	.684	3	2	0	0	—
