= List of Texas Tech Red Raiders head baseball coaches =

The Texas Tech Red Raiders baseball program is a collegiate baseball team representing Texas Tech University. The team competes in the Big 12 Conference, a National Collegiate Athletic Association (NCAA) Division I athletic conference. The program has had 9 head coaches since it began play during the 1926 season.

In 1929, after only four seasons, the program was cut due to a lack of interest in college baseball. In 1953, Texas Tech head football coach and athletic director DeWitt Weaver suggested the program be revived to strengthen the athletic department as part of a push for Southwest Conference (SWC) membership. The following year, Beattie Feathers was hired to field the first Texas Tech baseball team in 26 years. Since the 2013 season, Texas Tech alumnus Tim Tadlock has served as the Red Raiders' head coach.

Freeland, the first head coach, has the highest winning percentage of any Texas Tech baseball head coach with a 15–11–2 record (.673).

Hays is the all-time leader in games coached (1295), total wins (479), total losses (479), total ties (3), conference wins (278), conference losses (271), and conference winning percentage (.506%).

== Key ==
General
#	Number of coaches (Note: A running total of the number of head coaches.)
GC	Games coached
†	Elected to the National College Baseball Hall of Fame

Overall
OW	Wins
OL	Losses
OT	Ties
O%	Winning percentage

Conference (Note: Texas Tech was a member of the Border Conference, formally known as the Border Intercollegiate Athletic Association (BIAA), when the program was revived in 1954, but the Border Conference declared no baseball championship, although each year it acknowledged the team with the best record. Although Texas Tech was admitted to the SWC in 1956, the baseball team did not begin SWC play until 1968.)
CW	Wins
CL	Losses
CT	Ties
C%	Winning percentage

Postseason (Note: Postseason play involving the NCAA Division I Baseball Championship.)
PA	Total Appearances (Note: Postseason appearances include seasons with NCAA Division I Baseball Championship bids since the tournament began in 1947.)
PW	Total Wins
PL	Total Losses
WA	College World Series appearances (Note: College World Series appearances include seasons with CWS bids since the tournament began in 1947.)
WW	College World Series wins
WL	College World Series losses

Championships
DC	Division regular season
CC	Conference regular season (Note: Texas Tech was not in an athletic conference from 1926 through 1929 and 1954 through 1967.)
CT	Conference tournament (Note: The Border Intercollegiate Athletic Association did not hold a conference tournament. The Southwest Conference held a conference tournament from 1977-1991 and 1993-1996. The Big 12 Conference has held a conference tournament since 1997.)

== Coaches ==
List of head baseball coaches showing season(s) coached, overall records, conference records, postseason records, championships and selected awards*Statistics correct as of the end of the 2024 NCAA Division I baseball season
#	Name	Term (Note: Texas Tech did not sponsor a baseball team from 1930–1953.)	GC	OW	OL	OT	O%	CW	CL	CT	C%	PA	PW	PL	WA	WW	WL	DCs	CCs	CTs	NCs	Awards (Note: National, regional and conference coach of the year awards.)
1	Ewing Y. Freeland	1926–1927	32	15	11	2	.673	—	—	—	—	—	—	—	—	—	—	—	—	—	—	—
2	Grady Higginbotham	1928–1929	27	10	17	0	.370	—	—	—	—	—	—	—	—	—	—	—	—	—	—	—
3	Beattie Feathers	1954–1960	98	40	57	1	.413	—	—	—	—	0	—	—	—	—	—	—	—	—	—	—
4	Berl Huffman	1961–1967	167	80	87	0	.479	—	—	—	—	0	—	—	—	—	—	—	—	—	—	—
5	Kal Segrist	1968–1983	643	317	324	2	.495	135	192	0	.413	0	—	—	—	—	—	—	0	0	—	—
6	Gary Ashby	1984–1986	165	85	80	0	.515	18	45	0	.286	0	—	—	—	—	—	—	0	0	—	—
7	Larry Hays	1987–2008	1295	813	479	3	.629	278	271	2	.506	9	15	18	—	—	—	—	2	2	—	SWC (1995); Big 12 (1997)
8	Dan Spencer	2009–2012	227	115	112	0	.507	44	61	0	.419	0	—	—	—	—	—	—	0	0	—	—
9	Tim Tadlock	2013–present	694	453	241	0	.645	155	114	0	.576	9	33	21	4	4	8	—	3	0	—	SBA (2014); ABCA Midwest Region (2014); College Baseball Hall of Fame National (2014); Big 12 (2016); D1Baseball.com (2018)
