= Texas Tech Matadors basketball (1925 to 1935) =

The Texas Tech Matadors basketball teams represented Texas Technological College (now Texas Tech University) in the college basketball seasons of 1925–26 to 1934–35.

== 1925–26 ==
1925–26 Texas Tech Matadors men's basketball
- Conference: Independent
- Record: 6–8
- Head coach: Grady Higginbotham (1st season)

== 1926–27 ==
1926–27 Texas Tech Matadors men's basketball
- Conference: Independent
- Record: 8–10
- Head coach: Grady Higginbotham (2nd season)

== 1927–28 ==
1927–28 Texas Tech Matadors men's basketball
- Conference: Independent
- Record: 9–7
- Head coach: Victor Payne (1st season)

== 1928–29 ==
1928–29 Texas Tech Matadors men's basketball
- Conference: Independent
- Record: 9–8
- Head coach: Victor Payne (2nd season)

== 1929–30 ==
1929–30 Texas Tech Matadors men's basketball
- Conference: Independent
- Record: 13–6
- Head coach: Victor Payne (3rd season)

== 1930–31 ==
1930–31 Texas Tech Matadors men's basketball
- Conference: Independent
- Record: 11–9
- Head coach: W. L. Golightly (1st season)

== 1931–32 ==
1931–32 Texas Tech Matadors men's basketball
- Conference: Independent
- Record: 9–14
- Head coach: Dell Morgan (1st season)

== 1932–33 ==
1932–33 Texas Tech Matadors men's basketball

Border Conference regular season champion
- Conference: Border Intercollegiate Athletic Association
- Record: 9–14 (8–0 Border)
- Head coach: Dell Morgan (2nd season)

== 1933–34 ==
1933–34 Texas Tech Matadors men's basketball

Border Conference regular season champion
- Conference: Border Intercollegiate Athletic Association
- Record: 18–5 (7–1 Border)
- Head coach: Dell Morgan (3rd season)

== 1934–35 ==
1934–35 Texas Tech Matadors men's basketball

Border Conference regular season champion
- Conference: Border Intercollegiate Athletic Association
- Record: 14–10 (9–1 Border)
- Head coach: Virgil Ballard (1st season)
