= Sparks, Texas =

- Census-designated place
- Coordinates: 31°40′22″N 106°14′23″W
- Country: United States
- State: Texas
- County: El Paso

Government
  - Mayor: Gabriel Chester

Area
  - Total: 1.4 sq mi (3.5 km^{2})
  - Land: 1.4 sq mi (3.5 km^{2})
  - Water: 0 sq mi (0.0 km^{2})
- Elevation: 3,816 ft (1,163 m)

Population (2020)
  - Total: 4,760
  - Density: 3,500/sq mi (1,400/km^{2})
- Time zone: UTC-7 (Mountain (MST))
  - Summer (DST): UTC-6 (MDT)
- ZIP Code: 79928
- FIPS code: 48-69432
- GNIS feature ID: 2408787

Sparks is a census-designated place (CDP) in El Paso County, Texas, United States. As of the 2020 census, Sparks had a population of 4,760. It is part of the El Paso Metropolitan Statistical Area.

== Geography ==
According to the United States Census Bureau, the CDP has a total area of 1.3 square miles (3.4 km^{2}), all land.

== Demographics ==
Historical population
Census	Pop.	Note	%±
1990	1,276		—
2000	2,974		133.1%
2010	4,529		52.3%
2020	4,760		5.1%
U.S. Decennial Census; 1850–1900 1910; 1920 1930 1940; 1950 1960 1970; 1980 1990 2000; 2010

Sparks first appeared as a census designated place in the 2000 U.S. census.

=== Racial and ethnic composition ===
Sparks CDP, Texas – Racial and ethnic composition Note: the US Census treats Hispanic/Latino as an ethnic category. This table excludes Latinos from the racial categories and assigns them to a separate category. Hispanics/Latinos may be of any race.
Race / Ethnicity (NH = Non-Hispanic)	Pop 2000	Pop 2010	Pop 2020	% 2000	% 2010	% 2020
White alone (NH)	14	13	51	0.47%	0.29%	1.07%
Black or African American alone (NH)	0	6	15	0.00%	0.13%	0.32%
Native American or Alaska Native alone (NH)	2	19	12	0.07%	0.42%	0.25%
Asian alone (NH)	0	3	7	0.00%	0.07%	0.15%
Native Hawaiian or Pacific Islander alone (NH)	0	0	3	0.00%	0.00%	0.06%
Other race alone (NH)	0	0	2	0.00%	0.00%	0.04%
Mixed race or Multiracial (NH)	0	0	11	0.00%	0.00%	0.23%
Hispanic or Latino (any race)	2,958	4,488	4,659	99.46%	99.09%	97.88%
Total	2,974	4,529	4,760	100.00%	100.00%	100.00%

=== 2020 census ===
As of the 2020 census, Sparks had a population of 4,760. The median age was 30.3 years. 30.5% of residents were under the age of 18 and 10.8% of residents were 65 years of age or older. For every 100 females there were 94.5 males, and for every 100 females age 18 and over there were 94.4 males age 18 and over.

99.1% of residents lived in urban areas, while 0.9% lived in rural areas.

There were 1,434 households in Sparks, of which 46.7% had children under the age of 18 living in them. Of all households, 49.7% were married-couple households, 17.0% were households with a male householder and no spouse or partner present, and 28.3% were households with a female householder and no spouse or partner present. About 18.2% of all households were made up of individuals and 7.1% had someone living alone who was 65 years of age or older.

There were 808 families residing in the CDP.

There were 1,576 housing units, of which 9.0% were vacant. The homeowner vacancy rate was 0.9% and the rental vacancy rate was 5.4%.

=== 2000 census ===
As of the census of 2000, there were 2,974 people, 718 households, and 654 families residing in the CDP. The population density was 2,214.0 inhabitants per square mile (854.8/km^{2}). There were 793 housing units at an average density of 590.3 per square mile (227.9/km^{2}). The racial makeup of the CDP was 70.75% White, 0.17% Native American, 0.17% Asian, 28.11% from other races, and 0.81% from two or more races. Hispanic or Latino of any race were 99.46% of the population.

There were 718 households, out of which 67.7% had children under the age of 18 living with them, 69.1% were married couples living together, 15.9% had a female householder with no husband present, and 8.8% were non-families. 7.4% of all households were made up of individuals, and 2.2% had someone living alone who was 65 years of age or older. The average household size was 4.14 and the average family size was 4.37.

In the CDP, the population was spread out, with 42.8% under the age of 18, 11.9% from 18 to 24, 27.6% from 25 to 44, 13.5% from 45 to 64, and 4.2% who were 65 years of age or older. The median age was 22 years. For every 100 females, there were 95.4 males. For every 100 females age 18 and over, there were 92.1 males.

The median income for a household in the CDP was $21,964, and the median income for a family was $24,286. Males had a median income of $15,897 versus $14,395 for females. The per capita income for the CDP was $6,068. About 34.1% of families and 38.0% of the population were below the poverty line, including 42.3% of those under age 18 and 60.2% of those age 65 or over.

== Education ==
Sparks is in the Socorro Independent School District.

The zoned schools are: Mission Ridge Elementary School, Desert Wind Middle School, and Eastlake High School.
