= 1975–76 Houston Cougars men's basketball team =

American college basketball season

1975–76 Houston Cougars men's basketball
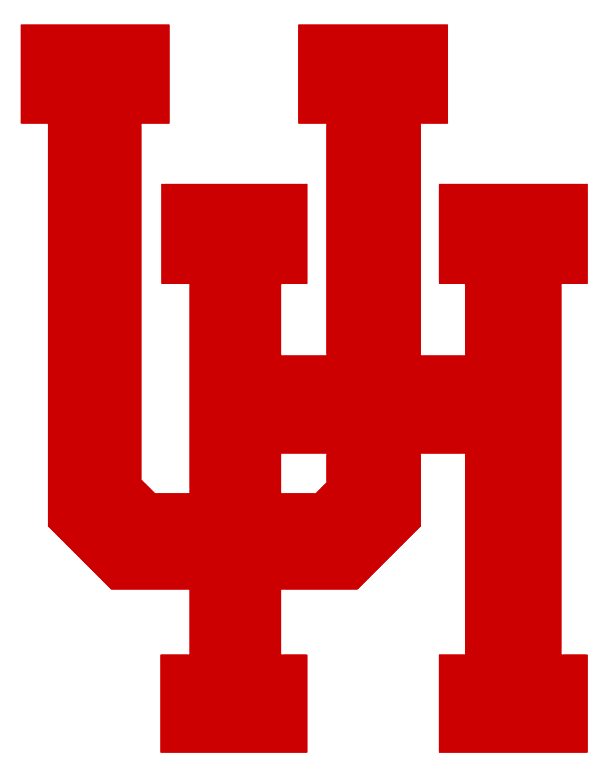
- Conference: Southwest Conference
- Record: 17–11 (7–9 SWC)
- Head coach: Guy Lewis (20th season)
- Assistant coaches: Harvey Pate; Don Schverak
- Home arena: Hofheinz Pavilion

1975–76 Southwest Conference men's basketball standings
	Conf.				Overall
Team	W		L	PCT	W		L	PCT
Texas A&M	14	–	2	.875	21	–	6	.778
No. 16 Texas Tech†	13	–	3	.813	25	–	6	.806
SMU	10	–	6	.625	16	–	12	.571
Arkansas	9	–	7	.563	19	–	9	.679
Baylor	8	–	8	.500	12	–	15	.444
Houston	7	–	9	.438	17	–	11	.607
TCU	6	–	10	.375	11	–	16	.407
Texas	4	–	12	.250	9	–	17	.346
Rice	1	–	15	.063	3	–	24	.111
† 1976 SWC tournament winner Rankings from AP Poll

The 1975–76 Houston Cougars men's basketball team represented the University of Houston in NCAA Division I competition in the 1975–76 season.

Houston, coached by Guy Lewis, played its home games in the Hofheinz Pavilion in Houston, Texas, and was in their first season as a member of the Southwest Conference.

== Roster ==
1975–76 Houston Cougars men's basketball team
Players
Coaches

Pos.	#	Name	Height	Weight	Year	Previous school	Hometown
G	00	Cecile Rose	6 ft 6 in (1.98 m)	189 lb (86 kg)	So		Nassau, The Bahamas
G	10	Otis Birdsong	6 ft 3 in (1.91 m)	190 lb (86 kg)	Jr	Winter Haven HS	Winter Haven, Florida
G	14	Ken Ciolli	6 ft 0 in (1.83 m)	—	Fr
F	44	Charles Thompson	6 ft 7 in (2.01 m)	230 lb (104 kg)	So
F	50	David Marrs	6 ft 8 in (2.03 m)	—	Sr

Head coach

- Guy Lewis (Houston)

Assistant coach(es)

- Harvey Pate (Oklahoma State)
- Don Schverak (Houston)

Legend

- (C) Team captain
- (S) Suspended
- (I) Ineligible
- (W) Walk-on
- Injured
- Current redshirt

Roster

== Schedule and results ==
Date time, TV	Rank^{#}	Opponent^{#}	Result	Record	Site city, state
Regular season
Dec 6, 1975*		Cal Poly	W 74–63	1–0	Hofheinz Pavilion; Houston, Texas
Dec 9, 1975*		Texas A&I	W 120–86	2–0	Hofheinz Pavilion; Houston, Texas
Dec 13, 1975*		St. Mary's	W 87–78	3–0	Hofheinz Pavilion; Houston, Texas
Dec 20, 1975*		Louisiana Tech	W 96–72	4–0	Hofheinz Pavilion; Houston, Texas
Dec 27, 1975*		at Dayton	W 72–68	5–0	UD Arena; Dayton, Ohio
Dec 29, 1975*		at No. 10 UNLV; Holiday Classic	L 92–116	5–1	Las Vegas Convention Center; Las Vegas, Nevada
Dec 30, 1975*		vs. No. 20 La Salle; Holiday Classic	W 90–87	6–1	Las Vegas Convention Center; Las Vegas, Nevada
Jan 2, 1976*		Houston Baptist; Bluebonnet Classic	W 78–59	7–1	Hofheinz Pavilion; Houston, Texas
Jan 3, 1976*		No. 19 San Francisco; Bluebonnet Classic	W 94–73	8–1	Hofheinz Pavilion; Houston, Texas
Jan 5, 1976		at Arkansas	L 47–92	8–2 (0–1)	Barnhill Arena; Fayetteville, Arkansas
Jan 10, 1976		Rice	W 87–59	9–2 (1–1)	Hofheinz Pavilion; Houston, Texas
Jan 12, 1976		Arkansas	W 72–71	10–2 (2–1)	Hofheinz Pavilion; Houston, Texas
Jan 14, 1976		at TCU	L 70–88	10–3 (2–2)	Daniel-Meyer Coliseum; Fort Worth, Texas
Jan 17, 1976		Texas	W 63–58	11–3 (3–2)	Hofheinz Pavilion; Houston, Texas
Jan 20, 1976		at Texas A&M	L 67–74	11–4 (3–3)	G. Rollie White Coliseum; College Station, Texas
Jan 24, 1976		Baylor	W 79–73	12–4 (4–3)	Hofheinz Pavilion; Houston, Texas
Jan 26, 1976		at SMU	L 75–87	12–5 (4–4)	Moody Coliseum; University Park, Texas
Jan 31, 1976		Texas Tech	L 54–57	12–6 (4–5)	Hofheinz Pavilion; Houston, Texas
Feb 3, 1976*		Houston Baptist	W 91–71	13–6	Hofheinz Pavilion; Houston, Texas
Feb 7, 1976		at Rice	W 99–79	14–6 (5–5)	Rice Gymnasium; Houston, Texas
Feb 10, 1976		TCU	W 103–95	15–6 (6–5)	Hofheinz Pavilion; Houston, Texas
Feb 14, 1976		at Texas	L 86–95	15–7 (6–6)	Gregory Gymnasium; Austin, Texas
Feb 17, 1976		Texas A&M	L 80–94	15–8 (6–7)	Hofheinz Pavilion; Houston, Texas
Feb 21, 1976		at Baylor	L 72–79	15–9 (6–8)	Heart O' Texas Coliseum; Waco, Texas
Feb 24, 1976		SMU	W 100–98	16–9 (7–8)	Hofheinz Pavilion; Houston, Texas
Feb 26, 1976		at Texas Tech	L 85–93	16–10 (7–9)	Lubbock Municipal Coliseum; Lubbock, Texas
SWC tournament
Feb 28, 1976*	(6)	at (5) Baylor; First round	W 88–86	17–10	Heart O' Texas Coliseum; Waco, Texas
Mar 4, 1976*	(6)	vs. (2) Texas Tech; Quarterfinals	L 69–80	17–11	Moody Coliseum; University Park, Texas
*Non-conference game. ^{#}Rankings from AP Poll. (#) Tournament seedings in parentheses. All times are in Central Time.
