= John Parchman =

American football player and coach

John Ed Parchman
Biographical details
- Born: c. 1949 (age 76–77)

Playing career
- ?: Cisco

Coaching career (HC unless noted)
- 1977–1979: Frenship HS (TX)
- 1980–1982: Coronado HS (TX) (assistant)
- 1983–1984: Cisco HS (TX)
- 1985–1988: Socorro HS (TX)
- 1989–1992: Lee HS (TX) (assistant)
- 1993–1994: Llano HS (TX)
- 1995–2003: Midland Lee HS (TX)
- 2006–2008: Cisco

Head coaching record
- Overall: 152–73–1 (high school)

Accomplishments and honors

Championships
- 3 Texas 5A state (1998–2000)

Awards
- USA Today HS coach of the year (1999)

John Ed Parchman (born c. 1949) is an American former football coach.

== High school coaching career ==
Parchman coached highly successfully for 20 years in West Texas high school football. As head coach at Frenship High School in Wolfforth, Socorro High School in El Paso, Llano High School in Llano and Lee High School in Midland he amassed a 152–73–1 coaching record.

While at Midland Lee, he compiled an 88–23–1 record in nine years, and led the Rebels with Cedric Benson to three consecutive state championships (1998–2000) in the largest classification. They were the only 5A team in Texas high school football history to “three-peat” until Southlake Carroll High School match this feat in 2006.

In 1999 Parchman was named National High School Coach of the Year by USA Today.

== College coaching career ==
After head coaching the Midland Lee Rebels he went to head coach Cisco Junior College football.
