= 1976 Southwest Conference men's basketball tournament =

- Classification: Division I
- Season: 1975–76
- Teams: 9
- Site: Moody Coliseum; Dallas, TX
- Champions: Texas Tech (1st title)
- Winning coach: Gerald Myers (1st title)
- MVP: Rick Bullock (Texas Tech)

1975–76 Southwest Conference men's basketball standings
	Conf.				Overall
Team	W		L	PCT	W		L	PCT
Texas A&M	14	–	2	.875	21	–	6	.778
No. 16 Texas Tech†	13	–	3	.813	25	–	6	.806
SMU	10	–	6	.625	16	–	12	.571
Arkansas	9	–	7	.563	19	–	9	.679
Baylor	8	–	8	.500	12	–	15	.444
Houston	7	–	9	.438	17	–	11	.607
TCU	6	–	10	.375	11	–	16	.407
Texas	4	–	12	.250	9	–	17	.346
Rice	1	–	15	.063	3	–	24	.111
† 1976 SWC tournament winner Rankings from AP Poll

The 1976 Southwest Conference men's basketball tournament was held March 4–6, 1976, at Moody Coliseum in Dallas, TX. The first round took place February 28 at the higher seeded campus sites.

Number 2 seed Texas Tech defeated 1 seed Texas A&M 74–72 to win their 1st championship and receive the conference's automatic bid to the 1976 NCAA tournament.

== Format and Seeding ==
The tournament consisted of 9 teams, seeds 2-8 played in an 8 team single-elimination tournament with the winner playing the top seeded team in the tournament final.

Place	Seed	Team	Conference			Overall		
Place	Seed	Team	W	L	%	W	L	%
1	1	Texas A&M	14	2	.875	21	6	.778
2	2	Texas Tech	13	3	.813	25	6	.806
3	3	SMU	10	6	.625	16	12	.571
4	4	Arkansas	9	7	.563	19	9	.679
5	5	Baylor	8	8	.500	12	15	.444
6	6	Houston	7	9	.438	17	11	.607
7	7	TCU	6	10	.375	11	16	.407
8	8	Texas	4	12	.250	9	17	.346
9	9	Rice	1	15	.063	3	24	.111

== Tournament ==
First round Saturday, February 28
2	Texas Tech	101
9	Rice	84
5	Baylor	86
6	Houston	88
4	Arkansas	81
7	TCU	65
3	SMU	103
8	Texas	90

Quarterfinals; Thursday, March 4
2	Texas Tech	80
6	Houston	69
4	Arkansas	74
3	SMU	70

Semifinals; Friday, March 5
2	Texas Tech	70
4	Arkansas	63

=== Final ===
Finals; Saturday, March 6
1	#19 Texas A&M	72
2	Texas Tech	74
