= Texas Tech Red Raiders basketball under Polk Robison =

College head coaching tenure

Polk Robison coached the Texas Tech Red Raiders basketball teams from 1942 through 1946 and 1947 through 1961, before stepping down to become the athletic director for the Texas Tech Red Raiders. Robison became the second head coach to coach the Red Raiders in nonconsecutive terms. Robison compiled a 254–195 record. Under Robison, the Red Raiders won two conference championships, one co-championship and earned their first bid to the NCAA tournament.

== 1942–43 ==
1942–43 Texas Tech Red Raiders basketball
- Conference: Border Intercollegiate Athletic Association
- Record: 16–7 (11–3 Border)
- Head coach: Polk Robison (1st season)

== 1943–44 ==
1943–44 Texas Tech Red Raiders basketball
- Conference: Independent
- Record: 5–18
- Head coach: Polk Robison (2nd season)

== 1944–45 ==
1944–45 Texas Tech Red Raiders basketball
- Conference: Border Intercollegiate Athletic Association
- Record: 10–14 (7–6 Border)
- Head coach: Polk Robison (3rd season)

== 1945–46 ==
1945–46 Texas Tech Red Raiders basketball
- Conference: Border Intercollegiate Athletic Association
- Record: 10–14 (7–6 Border)
- Head coach: Polk Robison (3rd season)

== 1947–48 ==
1947–48 Texas Tech Red Raiders basketball
- Conference: Border Intercollegiate Athletic Association
- Record: 16–12 (10–6 Border)
- Head coach: Polk Robison (4th season)

== 1949–50 ==
1949–50 Texas Tech Red Raiders basketball
- Conference: Border Intercollegiate Athletic Association
- Record: 14–12 (8–8 Border)
- Head coach: Polk Robison (5th season)

== 1950–51 ==
1950–51 Texas Tech Red Raiders basketball
- Conference: Border Intercollegiate Athletic Association
- Record: 14–14 (10–6 Border)
- Head coach: Polk Robison (6th season)

== 1951–52 ==
1951–52 Texas Tech Red Raiders basketball
- Conference: Border Intercollegiate Athletic Association
- Record: 14–10 (9–5 Border)
- Head coach: Polk Robison (7th season)

== 1952–53 ==
1952–53 Texas Tech Red Raiders basketball
- Conference: Border Intercollegiate Athletic Association
- Record: 12–10 (9–5 Border)
- Head coach: Polk Robison (8th season)

== 1956–57 ==
1956–57 Texas Tech Red Raiders basketball
- Conference: Independent
- Record: 12–11
- Head coach: Polk Robison (12th season)
- Home arena: Lubbock Municipal Coliseum

The 1956–57 was the first season the Red Raiders played in Lubbock Municipal Coliseum. Source:

== 1957–58 ==
1957–58 Texas Tech Red Raiders basketball
- Conference: Southwest Conference
- Record: 15–8 (8–6 SWC)
- Head coach: Polk Robison (13th season)
- Home arena: Lubbock Municipal Coliseum

1957–58 Southwest Conference men's basketball standings
	Conf.				Overall
Team	W		L	PCT	W		L	PCT
Arkansas	9	–	5	.643	17	–	10	.630
SMU	9	–	5	.643	15	–	10	.600
TCU	8	–	6	.571	17	–	7	.708
Texas Tech	8	–	6	.571	15	–	8	.652
Rice	7	–	7	.500	13	–	11	.542
Texas A&M	7	–	7	.500	11	–	13	.458
Texas	5	–	9	.357	10	–	13	.435
Baylor	3	–	11	.214	5	–	19	.208
Rankings from AP Poll

== 1958–59 ==
1958–59 Texas Tech Red Raiders basketball
- Conference: Southwest Conference
- Record: 15–9 (8–6 SWC)
- Head coach: Polk Robison (14th season)
- Home arena: Lubbock Municipal Coliseum

== 1959–60 ==
1959–60 Texas Tech Red Raiders basketball
- Conference: Southwest Conference
- Record: 10–14 (7–7 SWC)
- Head coach: Polk Robison (15th season)
- Home arena: Lubbock Municipal Coliseum
