= Mission Early College High School =

Location
- 10700 Gateway Boulevard East; El Paso, Texas 79927; United States; 31.679019°N 106.265289°W

Information
- Type: Early College High School
- Established: 2006
- NCES District ID: 4840710
- Educational authority: Texas Education Agency
- CEEB code: 442270
- NCES School ID: 484071011217
- Principal: Benjamin Ortega
- Teaching staff: 18.85 (FTE)
- Gender: Coeducational
- Enrollment: 410 (2024-2025)
  - Grade 9: 97
  - Grade 10: 100
  - Grade 11: 111
  - Grade 12: 102
- Student to teacher ratio: 16.53
- Campus: Mission Del Paso
- Colors: Teal and Blue
- Mascot: Phoenix
- Affiliations: El Paso Community College / Socorro Independent School District
- Website: www.sisd.net/o/missionearlycollege/

Mission Early College High School is a high school located in the Socorro Independent School District in El Paso, Texas.

The school combines the normal Texas Education Agency curriculum with that of El Paso Community College. Students at Mission Early College High School are concurrently enrolled in high school and college courses. Like other early college high schools in the nation, students exit the program with both an associate’s degree and a high school diploma. Most graduating students earn sufficient college credit to enter a four-year Texas university as a senior.

== Background ==
Mission Early College High School is a collaboration between El Paso Community College, Socorro Independent School District and the Texas High School Project of the Communities Foundation of Texas. Mission Early College High School opened in 2006 to prepare for the 2006–2007 school year. This unique school is founded on the belief that many young people are ready and eager to do serious college work. It enables highly motivated students to move in four years from the ninth grade through the first two years of college, earning the Associate of Arts (A.A.) degree.

Mission Early College High School has only 125 slots per grade level and thus is very selective. Every year, only 125 students are admitted into the freshman class. Transfers are only allowed if the student is coming from another school that offers an early college high school program.

== History ==
In its first year, Mission Early College High School welcomed its Inaugural class of 2010. Starting in the 2009–2010 school year, MECHS had students enrolled in all four grade levels.

On the Texas Assessment of Knowledge and Skills, MECHS has earned the title of Exemplary Campus every year.

Mission is a 2012 & 2018 recipient of the U.S. Department of Education's Blue Ribbon School of Excellence award.

== Requirements ==
Due to the nature and academic rigor of an early college high school program, students in the Socorro Independent School District must meet certain requirements to be admitted into the freshman class.

1. Potential students must possess a good discipline record
2. Students should exhibit a sincere interest in academics and be prepared to fit into an adult environment
3. Student should exhibit a sincere willingness to work hard to meet the high standards of Mission Early College High School
4. All students must reside in the Socorro Independent School District to apply
5. Applying students must be in compliance with the state attendance policy.

Those students interested in the program must fill out the common application provided by their middle-school counselor, and go through a lottery selection process. Due to the limited number of slots (125-140), students are urged to attend the school only if they truly have a desire to.

== IAE ==
IAE, or Initiative for the Advancement of Education, is a program started at Mission Early College High School with a philosophy of "[expanding] the abilities of Mission Early College High School to have the best quality education through technology, student-teacher interaction, community interaction, innovative programs, and professional-student interactions." The mission of this group is to better prepare the school to impart a better education on current and future students.
