= Socorro High School (Socorro, Texas) =

Public school in Texas, United States

Location
- 10150 Alameda Ave; El Paso, Texas; United States; 31.65887°N 106.29311°W

Information
- Type: Public
- Motto: Home of the Bulldogs
- Established: 1965
- Locale: Suburban, Large
- School district: Socorro Independent School District
- Principal: Ignacio Estorga
- Teaching staff: 152.93 (FTE)
- Grades: 9-12
- Enrollment: 2,579 (2024–2025)
- Student to teacher ratio: 16.86
- Colors: Red, Columbia blue
- Mascot: Chato and Chata
- Yearbook: El Chato
- Website: Socorro High School

Socorro High School is a four-year public high school located in Socorro, Texas, United States. It is part of the Socorro Independent School District.

The School was established in 1965, and serves grades 9-12. Socorro High School offers many academic and student organizations such as Advanced Placement, Dual Credit Courses, Socorro High School Fire Tech Program, Health Professions Academy (HPA), Socorro Early College (SEC), and the Bulldog P-TECH Program (Pathways in Technology Early College High School). Socorro was recognized as a National Blue Ribbon School from 1994–1996.

== History ==
In 1961, voters of Socorro held an election to determine the future of education in the area. That vote, by a tally of 63–0, resulted in the formation of the Socorro Independent School District. The district consisted of one school, Escontrias, that enrolled students through the eighth grade. It was not until March 1964 that a $500,000 bond was passed, enabling students of the area to attend high school in the Socorro area. Until then, students who wanted to attend high school went to either Clint High School or Ysleta High School. The eighth grade class of 1965 would be the first freshman class at the new high school, and one grade would be added each year until it became a four-year school.

Socorro graduated its first class in May 1968. Rafael (Ralph) Olivas was the highest ranking male student, and Mary Solis was the highest ranking female student from this first class. Both received college scholarships for their accomplishments.

Socorro High School opened in the fall of 1965, with A.D. Weir named as its first principal. Columbia blue, red, and white were chosen as the official school colors, and the bulldog was adopted as their mascot. A family who lived in the area actually donated their bulldog, "Homer", to the school to be used at special functions.

As early as 1970, population growth began to create problems for Socorro High School. In 1971, it could not accommodate the increasing enrollment, and a split session was adopted. Half of the student body attended from 7 am until noon, and the other half from noon until 5 pm. By 1972, expansion of the school temporarily alleviated those problems, but the issue would continue for years. By 1977, enrollment grew to the point that a separate junior high school was required. This too, was a temporary solution to the burgeoning population in the area, and Socorro Junior High School would last only until the mid-1980s. Socorro Junior High would eventually be converted into a part of Socorro High School.

In 1982, Bill Sybert was hired as superintendent of Socorro ISD. His major focus was to give the district an identity. His leadership created a "new face" for SISD. One of his big changes was the implementation of the K-8 concept. Junior high schools would no longer be built, but rather local schools would enroll students from kindergarten through eighth grade. This allowed the district to combine Socorro Junior High School with Socorro High, giving the high school the space it needed to become a state-of-the art school. Sybert embarked on a major remodeling program for SHS that not only included numerous academic facilities, but facilities for extracurricular activities as well. The result was a high school facility that took a back seat to none. Included in the expansion was a theater that could seat 1234 people, second only to the El Paso Civic Center in capacity, The Pit was the largest high school gymnasium in the city and second only to the Haskins Center, and the Socorro High School Library was the largest high school library in the state of Texas at the time.

== Extracurricular activities ==
=== Athletics ===
The Socorro High School Bulldogs compete in the following sports:

- Baseball
- Basketball
- Cross Country
- Football
- Golf
- Soccer
- Softball
- Swimming
- Tennis
- Track & Field
- Volleyball
- Wrestling

The school has a continuing rivalry with Montwood High School in football, where both teams play for "The Helmet", which has a side representing each school. This rivalry has produced some exciting games, usually occurring near the end of the sport's season.

The Socorro football team made the playoffs in 1990, 1991, 1995, 1996, 1997, 1998 and 2002. They won district championships in 1995, 1996, 1997, and 1998. The current head football coach and Socorro High School Athletic Coordinator is Edward Cano. Past head coaches of Socorro include Ricky Barraza, Glen Myers, Craig Ritchie, Jim Carson and John Parchman.

In 2009, the Socorro Baseball team led by head coach Chris Forbes won the 5A state championship against the Lufkin Panthers winning 12-7. They are one of only two baseball teams that have won a high school championship in the El Paso Area, with the Bowie High School Bears winning in 1949.

Socorro High School opened a new weight room on July 27, 2014.

=== Fine Arts ===
- Band
- Choir
- Dance
- Guitar
- Jazz Band
- Marching Band
- Mariachi
- Orchestra
- Piano
- Theatre Arts
- Visual Arts

Socorro High School is known for its mariachi program, named Los Gavilanes, which have competed in multiple UIL State Mariachi Festivals. In 2024 the Socorro High School theatre troupe "The Teatristas" along with other district troupes were one of 14 school districts awarded The Texas Thespians Premier Communities for Theatre Education Award.

=== Career & Technical Education ===
- Architecture
- Automotive Technology
- Business Information Management
- Communications
- Computer Maintenance
- Cosmetology/Barbering
- Criminal Justice
- Culinary Arts
- Digital and Interactive Media
- Electrical Technologies
- Engineering
- Family and Consumer Sciences (FCS)
- Fire Tech
- Graphic Design/Web Technology
- Marketing

== Notable alumni ==
- Atzimba Casas, soccer player
