= 1964–65 Texas Tech Red Raiders basketball team =

American college basketball season

1964–65 Texas Tech Red Raiders basketball

SWC regular season co-champion
- Conference: Southwest Conference
- Record: 17–6 (12–2 SWC)
- Head coach: Gene Gibson (4th season)
- Home arena: Lubbock Municipal Coliseum

The 1964–65 Texas Tech Red Raiders men's basketball team represented Texas Tech University in the Southwest Conference during the 1964–65 NCAA University Division men's basketball season. The head coach was Gene Gibson, who was in his fourth season with the team. The Red Raiders played their home games in the Lubbock Municipal Coliseum in Lubbock, Texas.
