= Socorro Independent School District =

School district in Texas, United States

The Socorro Independent School District (SISD) serves more than 47,000 students in 49 schools and is the second largest school district in El Paso, Texas. The district covers 135 square miles serving East El Paso, Horizon City and the City of Socorro. SISD is well known as a destination district for its high-quality instruction, innovative programs, and a supportive and united community. The district operates on a year-round calendar from July to May with a fall and spring intersession.

== History ==
In 1961, the residents of Socorro voted 63-0 for the formation of the Socorro Independent School District. At the time, Escontrias Elementary School was the only campus in the area for students. High school students attended Clint High School or Ysleta High School.

It wasn't until 1964 that the district built its first high school, Socorro High School. Socorro High School would house about 2,800 students for 40 years. The district's board of trustees decided that they needed another high school. In 1990, Montwood High School was built. The district built its football stadium, the SISD Student Activities Complex, in 1991. These two schools would begin an annual rivalry in football, in which the winner takes home the "Helmet"; a football helmet with a red side to represent Socorro, and a green side to represent Montwood. Montwood would serve about 3,000 students, when again, the board decided they needed a new school. Americas High School was built in 1996 and serves about 3,000 students.

The next addition to SISD was El Dorado High School. The first senior class graduated in 2007. Eastlake High School joined the district in August 2010, in unincorporated El Paso County adjoining Horizon City. The newest additions to the Socorro Independent School District for the 2015-2016 school year were Purple Heart Elementary School and Pebble Hills High School.

In 2022 the district opened magnet programs, with one specializing in fine arts at Paso Del Norte Elementary School, and one at Escontrias Elementary School specializing in STEAM fields.

In 2022 Nate Carman became the superintendent.

== Service area ==
It includes: Most of Socorro, all of Sparks, portions of El Paso, a portion of Horizon City, and a small section of Homestead Meadows North.

== Curriculum ==
In 1995 Socorro ISD was to open the Inter-American Magnet High School which was to offer Japanese as a subject.

== List of schools ==
All schools are in El Paso except when otherwise indicated.

=== High schools ===
- Americas High School
- Eastlake High School
- El Dorado High School
- Montwood High School
- Options High School (continuation high school)
- Pebble Hills High School
- Socorro High School (in Socorro)
  - 1994–96 National Blue Ribbon School

=== Early College Programs ===
- Mission Early College High School
- Socorro Early College
- Rams Early College
- Trailblazers Early College
- Falcon Early College opened in 2019-2020
- Pebble Hills Early College opened in 2019-2020
- Empire Early College to opened 2019-2020

Synergi4 available in middle schools and high schools

=== Middle schools ===
- Grades 6 to 8
  - Capt. Walter E. Clarke Middle School
  - Eastlake Middle School
  - SPC. Rafael Hernando III Middle School
    - 1997–98 National Blue Ribbon School
  - Montwood Middle School
  - SSG. Manuel R. Puentes Middle School
  - William D. Slider Middle School
  - Sun Ridge Middle School
  - Col. John O. Ensor Middle School (in Horizon City)
  - Salvador H. Sanchez Middle School (in Socorro)
  - Socorro Middle School (in Socorro)

=== K-8 Schools ===
- Grades kindergarten through eighth-grade
  - Bill Sybert School
  - Desert Wind School (in the El Paso Hills colonia north of Socorro)
  - Jane A. Hambric School
  - John Drugan School
  - Ernesto Serna School (in Socorro)

=== Elementary schools ===
  - Benito Martinez Elementary School
  - Cactus Trails Elementary School
  - Campestre Elementary School (in Socorro)
  - Chester E. Jordan Elementary School
  - Col. Ben Narbuth Elementary School
  - Dr. Sue Shook Elementary School (in Horizon City)
  - Elfida P. Chavez Elementary School
  - Escontrias Elementary School (in Socorro)
  - H.D. Hilley Elementary School (in Socorro)
  - Helen Ball Elementary School
  - Horizon Heights Elementary School (in Horizon City)
  - Hueco Elementary School (in Socorro)
  - Hurshel Antwine Elementary School
  - James P. Butler Elementary School
  - Loma Verde Elementary School
  - Lujan-Chavez Elementary School
  - Mission Ridge Elementary School (in Sparks)
  - Myrtle Cooper Elementary School
  - O'Shea Keleher Elementary School
  - Purple Heart Elementary School
  - Robert R. Rojas Elementary School (in Socorro)
  - Sgt. Jose F. Carrasco Elementary School
  - Sgt. Roberto Ituarte Elementary School
  - Sierra Vista Elementary School
  - Vista del Sol Elementary School
  - paso del norte fine arts academy

=== Alternative schools ===
- KEYS Academy (grades 1 through 5) (alternative school in Socorro)
- KEYS Academy (grades 6 through 12) (alternative school in Socorro)
- Options High School
