= Americas High School =

Public school in Texas, United States

Location
- 12101 Pellicano Drive; El Paso, Texas; United States; 31.729601°N 106.277359°W

Information
- Type: Public High School
- Established: 1996
- School district: Socorro Independent School District
- Superintendent: James P. Vasquez
- Principal: Nancy Torres
- Faculty: 175.5
- Teaching staff: 124.48 (FTE)
- Grades: 9th - 12th
- Enrollment: 2,049 (2024–2025)
- Student to teacher ratio: 16.46
- Campus: Urban
- Colors: Red, blue, white, and gold
- Slogan: Education is the key to your future
- Mascot: Travis the Trailblazer
- Nickname: Trailblazers
- TEA Rating: Academically Acceptable
- Website: www.sisd.net/o/americas

Americas High School is a high school in El Paso, Texas, United States.

== History ==
Americas High School first opened its doors in September 1996. In order to cause minimal disruption to area high school students, the school's first classes consisted of 7th, 8th, and 9th graders. The second year, 7th grade was dropped and 10th grade was added. The 3rd year, the 8th grade was dropped and Americas was considered a standard Texas high school. The school's first graduating class was in 2000. The school gained magnet school status with the addition of Libertas, an academy for government, law and public administration.

== Students ==
Americas High School is mostly composed of Hispanic students, with a mixed minority of Caucasians and African Americans.

== Campus ==
The Americas High School campus is on a 35-acre site and includes 132 classrooms, a library, computer lab, cafeteria, theater, athletic fields, and two gymnasiums.

The school's main building is arranged in an "L" shape consisting of 3 main hallway pods and 2 smaller hallways at either end. Each of the three main pods have two floors with classrooms on either end of a diamond shaped hallway. The second floor of each pod opens in the center to reveal the first floor. Additional classrooms have been added to the main building by filling in the space in the center on the first floor of each pod.

Like the other high schools in the Socorro Independent School District, there is not a stadium located on campus. Due to the Texas UIL realignment announced in 2013, as of 2014 Americas is a 6A school. Track/swim meets and football/soccer games are played at the SISD Student Activities Complex. A grass field is located on campus for freshmen football games and as a parade field for the NJROTC. A second grass field is used primarily for the placekickers. A concrete band practice field is in the middle of the "L". This field is also used as a marching pad for the NJROTC.

== Academics ==
The Americas High School Libertas Academy is one of the Advanced Academic Programs offered by Socorro ISD and is geared towards students who wish to pursue a career in government and public administration or law. Along with the high school's newest edition of the Trailblazers Early College (TEC), which helps students earn an associate degree while still attending regular high school. TEC provides student with a distinct educational experience, encouraging students to become resourceful, problem-solving members of society. Applicants selected based on completed TEC application.

=== Student Programs ===
- Academic Decathlon
- Book Club
- Destination Imagination
- DNA 1:1 Laptop Initiative
- Gifted & Talented
- Key Club
- Literary Anthology: The Spark
- National Honor Society
- National Technical Honor Society
- NJROTC
- Spanish National Honor Society
- Sports Medicine
- Theater
- Somos
- Yearbook

== Robotics ==
The Americas High School Robotics Team became one of the most popular student organizations during the 2023–2024 school year, the first year it reopened to the public after COVID-19. That year, the team competed in the FIRST Tech Challenge and placed 15th at the Regional Championship. In the 2024–2025 school year, the team entered the BEST Robotics competition in the New Mexico Hub. They advanced to the State Best of Texas Robotics Competition in the Rookie Bowl, where they were eliminated in the second round. In the 2025–2026 school year, competing again in the New Mexico Hub, the team won the UIL Large Division and qualified for the UIL Large Best of Texas Robotics Competition, ultimately earning second place in the Robot Game and becoming the first El Paso team to receive a UIL award at that event.

== Notable alumni ==
- Orlando Garcia (class of 2014), professional baseball player for the SF Giants Organization
- Elia Esparza (class of 2010), contestant on NBC's The Voice and ABC's American Idol
- Darell Hernáiz (class of 2019), major league baseball player for the Oakland Athletics
- Khalid (class of 2016), singer-songwriter
