= Kirby Hocutt =

American football player and coach, college athletics administrator

Current position
- Title: Athletic director
- Team: Texas Tech
- Conference: Big 12

Biographical details
- Born: 1971 (age 54–55); Sherman, Texas, U.S.

Playing career
- 1991–1994: Kansas State
- Position: Linebacker

Administrative career (AD unless noted)
- 2005–2008: Ohio
- 2008–2011: Miami (FL)
- 2011–present: Texas Tech

Kirby Hocutt (born 1971) is the athletic director at Texas Tech University in Lubbock, Texas. Additionally, Hocutt is the chairman of the NCAA Division I Football Recruiting Subcommittee. Hocutt formerly held the same position at Ohio University in Athens, Ohio from 2005 to 2008 and the University of Miami in Coral Gables, Florida from 2008 to 2011.

== Early years ==
Kirby Hocutt earned a bachelor's degree from Kansas State University in 1995, where he was a four-year letterman at the linebacker position. While playing for the Kansas State Wildcats, Hocutt earned all-conference team honors as a junior, and served as a team captain in his senior season. In 1993, The Sporting News selected him as one of the top 20 underrated players in the nation. Hocutt earned his Master of Education degree from the University of Oklahoma in 2001.

== Career ==
From 1999 to 2005, Hocutt was at the University of Oklahoma and served as associate athletics director for external operations and sports administration. Prior to joining the Oklahoma staff, Hocutt served as the coordinator of licensing at the National Collegiate Athletic Association (NCAA). He began his career in sports administration as the assistant director of marketing and promotions at his alma mater, Kansas State University.

At Oklahoma, he led the athletics fundraising to all-time high with both the Capital and Annual Giving campaigns. Oklahoma's annual giving went from $3.4 million to more than $17 million, making it the highest percent increase in intercollegiate athletics history.

A $100 million capital campaign for Oklahoma Athletics was led by the leadership of Hocutt. The campaign focused on facility construction and improvements to Oklahoma's 20 intercollegiate sport programs.

=== Ohio ===
In 2005, at the age of 33, Hocutt was hired as athletic director at Ohio University in Athens, Ohio. Hocutt increased fundraising by more than 75 percent and also secured the second largest gift to athletics in school history. During his three-year tenure, the athletics department won 11 team championships and four head coaches were honored as coaches of the year. The football team played in its first bowl game in 38 years and season ticket sales increased by 112 percent. Additionally, basketball season ticket sales increased by 50 percent.

On January 25, 2007, Hocutt announced the elimination of four varsity sports at Ohio University. Those sports include: men's swimming and diving, men's indoor track, men's outdoor track and women's lacrosse. The decision, made for budget reasons, was announced without any advance warning to the student athletes involved, causing major tension between the student body and the administration. The Athletic Department later revealed that the money saved would be used to strategically reinvest in revenue sports. The projected savings totaled $500,000. The cuts also brought Ohio University from 20 varsity sports to the Football Bowl Subdivision minimum of 16.

Less than 13 months later, in 2008, Hocutt left Ohio University for the same position at the University of Miami in Coral Gables, Florida.

=== Miami (FL) ===
Hocutt was introduced as the University of Miami's 11th Director of Athletics on Feb. 8, 2008 and began his tenure on June 1, 2008. While Director of Athletics for the Miami Hurricanes, Hocutt oversaw $26 million in new projects, including:

- the construction of a basketball practice facility;

- an upgrade to Alex Rodriguez Park at Mark Light Field;

- an upgrade to the Neil Schiff Tennis Center, and;

- an upgrade to Cobb Stadium, home to the Hurricanes women's soccer and track and field teams.

Hocutt was succeeded by former Wisconsin Assistant Athletic Director Shawn Eichorst. In 2009, Hurricane Football was co-recipient of the American Football Coaches Association Academic Achievement award for graduating 100 percent of the football athletes.

In 2010, all 18 Hurricane teams excelled in the NCAA's Academic Progress Rate Report (APR) and the athletic program recorded the best Graduation Success Rate of 86 percent. Miami finished sixth in the APR and is the only school Bowl Championship team among the 26 schools recognized that finished ranked in the final USA Today Coaches Poll and Associated Press poll following the 2009 athletic season.

A few months after Hocutt left Miami for Texas Tech, NCAA officials visited Miami to investigate allegations made by a former booster, Nevin Shapiro, a felon who is incarcerated for his role in a $900 million Ponzi Scheme. Shapiro said he gave hundreds of thousands of dollars in cash to Miami players and the service of prostitutes and entertainment at his million dollar homes and yachts from 2002 to 2010.

=== Texas Tech ===
On February 26, 2011, Hocutt resigned as director of athletics from the University of Miami for the same position at Texas Tech University. Hocutt replaced the retiring Gerald Myers, who served as athletic director for the Texas Tech Red Raiders since 1996. In his first month as athletic director, Hocutt hired Billy Gillispie to be the men's basketball coach. Former coach Pat Knight was fired before Hocutt took over as AD. On December 12, 2012, Hocutt hired former Texas Tech player Kliff Kingsbury to fill the football head coaching vacancy left by the resignation of Tommy Tuberville. Hocutt is the current chairman of the NCAA Division I Football Recruiting Subcommittee.

In February 2015, Hocutt was selected to replace West Virginia athletic director Oliver Luck as the Big 12 Conference's representative to the College Football Playoff committee.

== Personal life ==
He and his wife, Diane, have two sons, Drew and Brooks. In March 2010, Hocutt was selected as a "Forty Under 40" recipient by Street & Smith's SportsBusiness Journal; the publication's program identifies and honors young executives in the sports business under the age of 40.
