= Texas Tech Red Raiders basketball under Gene Gibson =

College head coaching tenure

Gene Gibson coached the Texas Tech Red Raiders basketball teams from 1961 to 1969 and the third-most conference victories in Tech's history. In Gibson's eight seasons at Texas Tech, he compiled a 101–91 record won two conference co-championships and earned one NCAA tournament bid.

== 1962–63 ==
1962–63 Texas Tech Red Raiders basketball
- Conference: Southwest Conference
- Record: 6–17 (6–8 SWC)
- Head coach: Gene Gibson (2nd season)
- Home arena: Lubbock Municipal Coliseum

== 1963–64 ==
1963–64 Texas Tech Red Raiders basketball
- Conference: Southwest Conference
- Record: 16–7 (11–3 SWC)
- Head coach: Gene Gibson (3rd season)
- Home arena: Lubbock Municipal Coliseum

== 1965–66 ==
1965–66 Texas Tech Red Raiders basketball
- Conference: Southwest Conference
- Record: 13–11 (8–6 SWC)
- Head coach: Gene Gibson (5th season)
- Home arena: Lubbock Municipal Coliseum

== 1966–67 ==
1966–67 Texas Tech Red Raiders basketball
- Conference: Southwest Conference
- Record: 9–15 (7–7 SWC)
- Head coach: Gene Gibson (6th season)
- Home arena: Lubbock Municipal Coliseum

== 1967–68 ==
1967–68 Texas Tech Red Raiders basketball
- Conference: Southwest Conference
- Record: 10–14 (5–9 SWC)
- Head coach: Gene Gibson (7th season)
- Home arena: Lubbock Municipal Coliseum

== 1968–69 ==
1968–69 Texas Tech Red Raiders basketball
- Conference: Southwest Conference
- Record: 11–13 (6–8 SWC)
- Head coach: Gene Gibson (8th season)
- Home arena: Lubbock Municipal Coliseum
