= Atzimba Casas =

American-born Mexican footballer (born 1994)

Personal information
- Full name: Atzimba Casas Escudero
- Date of birth: 14 September 1994 (age 32)
- Place of birth: El Paso, Texas, U.S.
- Position: Forward

Youth career
- Socorro Bulldogs

College career
Years	Team	Apps	(Gls)
2013–2014	UTEP Miners	3	(0)

Senior career*
Years	Team	Apps	(Gls)
2020–2021	Juárez	37	(13)
2021–2022	Guadalajara	14	(1)

International career
2020	Mexico	1	(0)
- * Club domestic league appearances and goals

Atzimba Casas Escudero (born 14 September 1994) is a retired footballer who played as a forward. Born in the United States, she represented the Mexico national team in several tournaments between 2017 and 2020. Casas played professionally in Liga MX Femenil teams FC Juárez and C.D. Guadalajara. At youth level, she played for Socorro High School, and went on to play for the University of Texas at El Paso (UETP) and the Universidad Autónoma de Ciudad Juárez, competing at the collegiate level in both the United States and Mexico. She is currently a PhD student in material science and engineering at UTEP.

== Early life ==
Atzimba Casas Escudero was born in El Paso, Texas, United States, on 14 September 1994 to José Casas and María Escudero, whom were born in Mexico. Casas has dual Mexican and American citizenship. She also has two siblings. Athletics were a common pursuit in her family; her grandfather played baseball, and her father played baseball, football, and track. Though she was raised across the international border in Mexico, her family permanently relocated to El Paso when she was four.

Casas said she drew her inspiration for playing the sport by watching the Japanese anime show Captain Tsubasa (Spanish: Supercampeones), recalling that it kept her entertained as a child with little else to do. Casas practiced other sports as a child, including track and field, basketball, swimming, volleyball, and flag football, but nothing called her attention like association football (soccer) did. Casas played several positions growing up. She started as a goalkeeper in first grade, before moving as defender and midfielder. As she grew older she moved to play as a forward. Growing up, Casas recalled that several of her friends' parents regarded football as a men's sport, citing the machismo prevalent in her surroundings.

== Youth career ==
Casas attended Socorro High School in El Paso, where she played forward on their soccer team, the Socorro Bulldogs. Her father was her coach for more than ten years. In her first year, she scored 24 goals. In her 2010 school year, Casas scored 19 goals, but the main forward at the school was Alejandra Carpio, who scored 82 goals in the 2010 and 2009 seasons.

Upon Carpio's graduation in 2011, Casas became the team's leading forward in her second year. In a February 2011 match, she scored four goals, drawing attention from local media. Her coach commented, "Tonight she scored four goals and she's only a sophomore." During penalty shoot-outs, Casas also played as the assigned goalkeeper. In addition to football, Casas also competed in track and field, where she recorded a state qualifying time for the 100-meter sprint. Throughout high school, Casas excelled academically, maintaining a 99.97 grade point average and finishing fourth in her graduating class.

In her first years of high school, Casas suffered several injuries that halted her development, though she remained injury-free in her senior year and turned in a strong performance. Casas scored 149 goals over four years in high school, 62 of which came in her senior year, when her team claimed the District 1-5A title with a 13–1 record. In her senior year, she was named the district's Most Valuable Player and an El Paso Times all-city first-team selection. In high school she was noted for her scoring ability, fast pace, ball control, and precise technique.

After graduating high school in 2013, she signed a National Letter of Intent and joined the University of Texas at El Paso (UTEP) to play for the UTEP Miners as a forward. Although several schools offered Casas a full athletic scholarship, she opted to attend UTEP to remain closer to her family in El Paso. School obligations and research work during school pushed her away from football for about two years, which made her think that her sports career was over after this long of a hiatus. She did her last semester at the Universidad Autónoma de Ciudad Juárez (UACJ) in Ciudad Juárez, Mexico, to play football for their team, the Indias de la UACJ. She completed her degree in biochemistry.

== Club career ==
Casas debuted in the Liga MX Femenil, the highest division of women's football in Mexico, with FC Juárez (Bravas de Juárez) on 6 January 2020 in a game against Club América. According to her player profile, she was 25 years old at the time of her debut, weight 65 kg (143 lb) and was 1.63 m (5 ft 4 in) tall. She was registered as a forward.

Early in her professional career, Casas was noted for her offensive versatility, prolific scoring, and ability to provide assists. She played for FC Juárez for three seasons: Clausura 2020, and Guardianes 2020 and 2021. During her time at FC Juárez, Casas became the club's all-time top scorer with 13 goals in 37 appearances (34 in which she was a starter). Her best individual performance was in the Guardianes 2020, where she scored five goals in 13 appearances.

In June 2021, Casas transferred to C.D. Guadalajara (Chivas), which had just finished as runners-up in the previous tournament. The club intended to pair Casas with their forwards Alicia Cervantes and Rubí Soto for a stronger offense. In an interview, she stated that she had been a fan of the club in her youth and that her favorite player was Omar Bravo, one of the top goalscorers for the men's team. "Being at the club is like a dream; it exceeds my expectations," she said.

Casas played her first match against Club León. She scored her first goal in the final 6–0 landslide win against Club Necaxa; she played for 37 minutes. Casas suffered a muscular injury that season that prevented her from playing. She left the team in June 2022, at the start of Apertura 2022, after not performing to the club's expectations.

== International career ==
During her amateur career, Casas represented the Mexico national team at the 2017 Summer Universiade in Taipei, Taiwan, and the 2019 Summer Universiade in Naples, Italy. In the 2019 edition, she scored a goal against Brazil in a 2–0 victory. The Mexican team placed 10th in the tournament. In February 2020, she was named to the senior Mexico women's national team roster for the Cyprus Women's Cup. At the time of her call-up, she had accumulated approximately 700 minutes of playing time with FC Juárez and had started eight consecutive matches in the Clausura 2020, scoring goals against Querétaro, Cruz Azul, Atlas, and Pumas.

Casas made her senior debut for the Mexico national football team on 8 March 2020 in a 2–2 draw against Slovakia in the 2020 Cyprus Women's Cup. She entered as a substitute in the 75th minute.

== Academia ==
As of 2026, she is a Doctor of Philosophy (PhD) student at UTEP, pursuing a degree in materials science and engineering.
