= El Dorado High School (El Paso, Texas) =

Public school in Texas, United States

Location
- 12401 Edgemere Blvd; El Paso, Texas 79938; United States; 31.793°N 106.259°W

Information
- Type: Public
- Established: 2003
- School district: Socorro Independent School District
- Principal: Patricia Pedrosa
- Teaching staff: 130.79 (FTE)
- Grades: 9 to 12
- Enrollment: 2,109 (2024–2025)
- Student to teacher ratio: 16.13
- Colors: Cardinal, gold, and black
- Slogan: Home of Champions and Scholars
- Athletics conference: 1 AAAAA
- Mascot: Montezuma the Aztec
- Nickname: Home of the Aztecs
- Website: www.sisd.net/o/eldorado

El Dorado High School is a public high school located in El Paso, Texas, United States.

== Academics ==
The school offers International Baccalaureate, Advanced Placement program, dual credit, and Advancement Via Individual Determination (AVID) programs.

== Athletics ==
El Dorado athletics offers baseball, men's and women's basketball, cheerleading, men's and women's cross country, football, men's and women's soccer, softball, swimming, golf, tennis, track, women's volleyball, and wrestling.

== Extra-curricular activities ==
=== Clubs ===
- Architecture
- Aztec Speech and Debate
- Book Club
- Business Professionals of America
- Chess Team
- Crimestoppers
- Cycling & Running Club
- D.E.C.A.
- Environmental Club
- F.A.C.T.S
- Feminism Club
- The F.O.G.
- French Club
- Gifted and Talented Club
- High Q
- IB Creativity Action & Service Club
- IB Newsletter Committee
- Library Book Club
- Mock Trial
- National Honor Society
- National Technical Honor Society
- PALS
- Pep Squad
- Principal Advisory Committee
- Robotics
- Skills USA
- Student Council
- SWAT Team
- Student Ambassador
- T.A.F.E.
- Theater
- United States Academic Decathlon (U.S.A.D.)

=== Fine arts ===
- Art & Anime Club
- Aztec Sundancers
- Choir
- IB
- Mahuitzli Flags
- Marching Band/Concert Band/Jazz Band
- Mariachi
- Musical Theatre
- Orchestra
- Theater Society
- Guitar
- Piano
