= Pebble Hills High School =

School in Texas, United States

Coordinates: 31.7800°N 106.2186°W

Location
- 14400 Pebble Hills Boulevard; El Paso, (El Paso County), Texas 79938; United States

Information
- Type: Public high school
- Established: 2015; 11 years ago
- School district: Socorro Independent School District
- Principal: Greta Brasgalla
- Staff: 124.06 (FTE)
- Grades: 9-12
- Enrollment: 2,912 (2023-24)
- Student to teacher ratio: 23.47
- Colors: Teal and desert orange
- Nickname: Spartans
- Website: Pebble Hills High School

Pebble Hills High School is a school in El Paso, Texas, United States, in the Socorro Independent School District. The campus officially opened its doors on July 1, 2015 serving 9th, 10th, 11th, and 12th grade students. The school mascot is the Spartan. The school colors are teal and desert orange.

== Academics ==
The Sparta Business Academy will offer students a four-year program in business and finance with an opportunity to earn an associate degree in collaboration with El Paso Community College, internships and other real-world experiences. Although this Early College Program is not just reserved for Spartan Business Academy members, it is open for any student deciding on the school in 8th grade. And its recipients are chosen by a lottery system for the purpose of creating an equal field for all entering the raffle. Pebble Hill's Early College first graduating class was 2023.
