= Texas Tech Red Raiders basketball under Berl Huffman =

College head coaching tenure

Berl Huffman coached the Texas Tech Red Raiders basketball teams from 1935 through 1942 and the 1946–47 season. Huffman was the first head coach to coach the Red Raiders in nonconsecutive terms. Huffman compiled a 121–67 record. Under Huffman, the Red Raiders received their first postseason bid to the NAIB tournament.

== 1935–36 ==
1935–36 Texas Tech Matadors men's basketball
- Conference: Border Intercollegiate Athletic Association
- Record: 10–10 (8–6 Border)
- Head coach: Berl Huffman (1st season)

== 1936–37 ==
1936–37 Texas Tech Matadors men's basketball
- Conference: Border Intercollegiate Athletic Association
- Record: 18–7 (8–6 Border)
- Head coach: Berl Huffman (2nd season)

== 1937–38 ==
1937–38 Texas Tech Red Raiders basketball
- Conference: Border Intercollegiate Athletic Association
- Record: 9–13 (7–7 Border)
- Head coach: Berl Huffman (3rd season)

== 1938–39 ==
1938–39 Texas Tech Red Raiders basketball
- Conference: Border Intercollegiate Athletic Association
- Record: 13–6 (13–3 Border)
- Head coach: Berl Huffman (4th season)

== 1939–40 ==
1939–40 Texas Tech Red Raiders basketball
- Conference: Independent
- Record: 21–7
- Head coach: Berl Huffman (5th season)

== 1940–41 ==
1940–41 Texas Tech Red Raiders basketball
- Conference: Independent
- Record: 19–6
- Head coach: Berl Huffman (6th season)

== 1941–42 ==
1941–42 Texas Tech Red Raiders basketball
- Conference: Border Intercollegiate Athletic Association
- Record: 16–11 (12–4 Border)
- Head coach: Berl Huffman (7th season)

== 1946–47 ==
1946–47 Texas Tech Red Raiders basketball
- Conference: Border Intercollegiate Athletic Association
- Record: 16–11 (12–4 Border)
- Head coach: Berl Huffman (8th season)
