= Eastlake High School (Texas) =

Public high school in Texas, United States

Coordinates: 31.6962°N 106.2383°W

Location
- 13000 Emerald Pass Ave; El Paso, Texas, (El Paso County) 79928; United States

Information
- School type: Public, high school
- Founded: 2010
- Status: Enrolling
- School district: Socorro Independent School District
- Teaching staff: 124.47 (FTE)
- Grades: 9-12
- Age: 14 to 19
- Enrollment: 2,947 (2023–2024)
- Student to teacher ratio: 23.68
- Colors: Purple, orange, and silver
- Team name: The Falcons
- Rival: Pebble Hills High School
- Website: www.sisd.net/o/eastlakehs

Eastlake High School is a school in unincorporated El Paso County, Texas, near Horizon City, Texas, United States, on the edge of El Paso. The school is in the Socorro Independent School District, and opened in 2010.
