= List of Louisiana Tech Bulldogs head football coaches =

The Louisiana Tech Bulldogs football program is a college football team that represents Louisiana Tech University in Conference USA in the National Collegiate Athletic Association. The team has had 33 head coaches and one interim head coach since it started playing organized football in 1901. The current head coach of the Bulldogs is Sonny Cumbie, who was hired on November 30, 2021. Cumbie previously served as the interim head coach, offensive coordinator and quarterbacks coach at Texas Tech University.

== Key ==
Key to symbols in coaches list
General		Overall		Conference		Postseason (Note: Although the first Rose Bowl Game was played in 1902, it has been continuously played since the 1916 game, and is recognized as the oldest bowl game by the NCAA. "—" indicates any season prior to 1916 when postseason games were not played.)	
No.	Order of coaches (Note: A running total of the number of head coaches, with coaches who served separate tenures being counted only once. Interim head coaches are represented with "Int" and are not counted in the running total. "—" indicates the team played but either without a coach or no coach is on record. "X" indicates an interim year without play.)	GC	Games coached	CW	Conference wins	PW	Postseason wins
DC	Division championships	OW	Overall wins	CL	Conference losses	PL	Postseason losses
CC	Conference championships	OL	Overall losses	CT	Conference ties	PT	Postseason ties
NC	National championships	OT	Overall ties (Note: Overtime rules in college football were introduced in 1996, making ties impossible in the period since.)	C%	Conference winning percentage		
†	Elected to the College Football Hall of Fame	O%	Overall winning percentage (Note: When computing the win–loss percentage, a tie counts as half a win and half a loss.)				

== Coaches ==
List of head football coaches showing season(s) coached, overall records, conference records, postseason records, championships and selected awards (Note: Statistics correct as of the end of the 2025 NCAA Division I FCS football season.)
No.	Name	Year(s) (Note: Louisiana Tech did not field a team for their 1918 and 1943 seasons.)	Seasons	GC	OW	OL	OT	O%	CW	CL	CT	C%	PW	PL	PT	CC	NC	Awards
1	Edwin Barber	1901	1	2	0	2	0	.000	—	—	—	—	—	—	—	—	0	—
2	Frank Singleton	1902	1	3	1	1	1	0.500	—	—	—	—	—	—	—	—	0	—
3	W. M. Robb	1903	1	2	1	1	0	0.500	—	—	—	—	—	—	—	—	0	—
4	E. G. Pierce	1904	1	4	1	3	0	0.250	—	—	—	—	—	—	—	—	0	—
5	J. U. Bragg	1905	1	1	0	1	0	.000	—	—	—	—	—	—	—	—	0	—
6	Zack T. Young	1906	1	6	2	1	3	0.583	—	—	—	—	—	—	—	—	0	—
7	George L. Watkins	1907	1	10	9	1	0	0.900	—	—	—	—	—	—	—	—	0	—
8	Albert L. Cornell	1908	1	8	4	3	1	0.563	—	—	—	—	—	—	—	—	0	—
9	Percy S. Prince	1909–1915, 1919	7, 1	46	24	16	5	0.589	2	1	1	.625	—	—	—	1	0	—
10	A. Flack	1916	1	6	2	4	0	.333	1	1	0	.500	—	—	—	0	0	—
11	Villis S. Pugh	1917	1	5	2	3	0	.400	0	2	0	.000	—	—	—	0	0	—
12	R. Foster Clark	1920–1921	2	12	11	1	0	.917	4	1	0	.800	—	—	—	0	0	—
13	William Henry Dietz^{†}	1922–1923	2	15	11	3	1	.767	3	2	1	.583	—	—	—	0	0	—
14	Philip Arbuckle	1924	1	8	1	6	1	.188	0	1	0	.000	—	—	—	0	0	—
15	Ralph C. Kenney	1925	1	9	1	6	2	.222	1	2	1	.375	—	—	—	0	0	—
16	Hugh E. Wilson	1926–1927	2	17	8	7	2	.529	4	4	0	.500	—	—	—	0	0	—
17	Tod Rockwell	1928–1929	2	19	5	11	3	.333	2	9	2	.231	—	—	—	0	0	—
18	George Bohler	1930–1933	4	32	15	17	0	.469	12	11	0	.522	—	—	—	0	0	—
19	Eddie McLane	1934–1938	5	50	27	19	4	.580	16	12	3	.565	—	—	—	0	0	—
20	Ray E. Davis	1939	1	11	5	6	0	.455	3	4	0	.429	—	—	—	0	0	—
21	Joe Aillet^{†}	1940-1942, 1944–1966	26	245	151	86	8	.633	92	34	54	.723	—	—	—	12	0	4-time Gulf States Conference Coach of the Year; Louisiana Tech Athletic Hall of Fame (1984); Louisiana Sports Hall of Fame; Holy Cross School Sports Hall of Fame (2018)
22	Maxie Lambright	1967–1978	12	133	95	36	2	.722	41	18	1	.692	8	3	0	7	3	Louisiana Sports Hall of Fame; Louisiana Tech Athletic Hall of Fame (1984); University of Southern Mississippi Sports Hall of Fame (1974)
23	Larry Beightol	1979	1	10	2	8	0	.200	1	4	0	.200	0	0	0	0	0	—
Int	Pat Patterson	1979	1	1	1	0	0	1.000	0	0	0	–	0	0	0	0	0	—
24	Billy Brewer	1980–1982	3	35	19	15	1	.557	9	5	1	.633	1	1	0	1	0	—
25	A. L. Williams	1983–1986	4	48	28	19	1	.594	14	9	0	.609	3	1	0	1	0	1984 Louisiana Coach of the Year
26	Carl Torbush	1987	1	11	3	8	0	.273	—	—	—	—	0	0	0	—	0	—
27	Joe Raymond Peace	1988–1995	8	88	41	43	4	.489	5	13	0	.278	0	0	1	0	0	1990 Louisiana Coach of the Year
28	Gary Crowton	1996–1998	3	34	21	13	—	.618	—	—	—	—	0	0	0	—	0	—
29	Jack Bicknell, Jr.	1999–2006	8	95	43	52	—	.453	24	23	—	.511	0	1	—	1	0	2001 WAC Coach of the Year
30	Derek Dooley	2007–2009	3	37	17	20	—	.459	12	12	—	.500	1	0	—	0	0	2008 Louisiana Coach of the Year
31	Sonny Dykes	2010–2012	3	37	22	15	—	.595	14	7	—	.667	0	1	—	1	0	2011 WAC Coach of the Year
32	Skip Holtz	2013–2021	9	118	65	53	—	.551	43	27	—	.614	6	1	—	0	0	2016 C-USA Coach of the Year
33	Sonny Cumbie	2022–present	5	50	19	31	—	.380	13	19	—	.406	1	1	—	0	0	—
