= 1975–76 Texas Tech Red Raiders basketball team =

American college basketball season

1975–76 Texas Tech Red Raiders basketball

SWC Classic tournament

NCAA Men's Division I Basketball Tournament Sweet 16, L, 86–75 v. Missouri
- Conference: Southwest Conference

Ranking
- AP: No. 16
- Record: 25–6 (13–3 SWC)
- Head coach: Gerald Myers (6th season)
- Home arena: Lubbock Municipal Coliseum

1975–76 Southwest Conference men's basketball standings
	Conf.				Overall
Team	W		L	PCT	W		L	PCT
Texas A&M	14	–	2	.875	21	–	6	.778
No. 16 Texas Tech†	13	–	3	.813	25	–	6	.806
SMU	10	–	6	.625	16	–	12	.571
Arkansas	9	–	7	.563	19	–	9	.679
Baylor	8	–	8	.500	12	–	15	.444
Houston	7	–	9	.438	17	–	11	.607
TCU	6	–	10	.375	11	–	16	.407
Texas	4	–	12	.250	9	–	17	.346
Rice	1	–	15	.063	3	–	24	.111
† 1976 SWC tournament winner Rankings from AP Poll

The 1975–76 Texas Tech Red Raiders men's basketball team represented Texas Tech University in the Southwest Conference during the 1975–76 NCAA Division I men's basketball season. The head coach was Gerald Myers, his 6th year with the team. The Red Raiders played their home games in the Lubbock Municipal Coliseum in Lubbock, Texas.
