= Montwood High School =

Location
- 12000 Montwood Drive; El Paso, Texas; United States; 31.76245°N 106.27653°W

Information
- Type: Public
- Motto: Where Excellence Abounds
- Established: 1989
- School district: Socorro Independent School District.
- Faculty: 148.17 (FTE)
- Grades: 9-12
- Enrollment: 2,722 (2018–19)
- Student to teacher ratio: 18.37
- Campus: Urban
- Colors: Kelly green and Royal blue
- Mascot: Rocky the Ram
- Yearbook: Aries
- Website: MHS Official Website

Montwood High School is a four-year public high school located in the East El Paso area of El Paso, Texas, United States. It is a part of the Socorro Independent School District.

The school was completed in 1989, just in time for the 1990/1991 school year. The school was opened serving grades 7, 8, 9, 10 and would gain a grade/lose a grade until the first graduating class of 1993. Montwood has many academic programs such as Advanced Placement, Dual Credit, MASI (Montwood Advanced Studies Institute), REC (Rams Early College), AVID (Advancement Via Individual Determination) and Synergy. Montwood was named a 1997-98 National Blue Ribbon School.

== History ==
In August 1990, Montwood High School opened with Art Shaw serving as principal. Faculty and staff began teaching in 1990. Montwood High School first opened with grades 7,8,9,10 the first school senior did not graduate until 1993. Montwood High School was built to hold a total of 2,200 student’s. In 1993, Montwood implements their first year-round program, not many Texas school offer this program. Montwood administration, faculty, and staff students have been accredited with the southern association of college and schools. In August 1991, Montwood took a big technological step by implementing televisions in every classroom for morning and afternoon announcements. From 1994 to 1997 Montwood High School was labeled as a Mentor school. In 1994, Montwood High School reached an enrollment of 2,690 students. To accommodate the new students, the school built five portables and 26 teachers were hired on to the education staff. Montwood also received a new principal David Del Toro, in August 1995. Ken Bailey and Ralph were also added to the Montwood High School administration as assistant principals. In 1997, Montwood High School department of education was recognized at a national level. They were labeled a National Blue ribbon school. From that day on, Montwood High School received the title "Montwood High School where excellence abounds". In 2004, Juni Mathews became the new principal of Montwood High School. She also brought in two new assistant principals, Bobbi Abdo and Kim Baxter. In August 2005, Derrick Brown became a Montwood High School assistant principal. The following year Patricia Cuevas also became a Montwood High School assistant principal." In November 2014, the Montwood High School Speech and Debate team won its first ever Sweepstakes award at the Eastwood High school TFA Qualifier tournament

=== Riot ===
In January 2003, over 1,000 students walked out of class in protest of the district-wide change from a traditional eight-period schedule to a block schedule. The then-peaceful protest turned into what was later called a riot when the El Paso Police and SWAT teams demanded that the students return to class. When the students were slow to mobilize, the officers began to push the students towards the building, causing some students to retaliate with rocks and water bottles. Ultimately, several students and some teachers were arrested. The school was placed under lockdown for the remainder of the school day, though many students had left it within minutes of the riot's beginning. The riot made its way to The New York Times due to police brutality controversies. The school district still uses traditional 8th period scheduling.

== Campus ==
Montwood consists of three main buildings and one separate career and technology building. The "A" Building, which is shaped like two joined lower-case "t's" is the primary academic building where the majority of classes are held. It consists of three floors, with the first floor housing the theatre, library, administrative offices, cafeteria and the Commons. The second floor contains more classrooms and a mezzanine which surrounds and overlooks the commons below. The third floor only contains classrooms.

The "B" building houses the campus's two gyms: the main Tony Harper Gymnasium (formerly the Green Gym), and the auxiliary Blue Gym. The majority of classes held here are in the fine Arts, such as choir, band, dance, and orchestra, as well as health and physical education classes and most of the sports locker rooms. The building is two floors, with two areas adjacent to each gym overlooking the basketball courts.

The "C" Hall, or Sky-Walk, is the second-floor hallway with eight classrooms that joins the A and B buildings together.

The new Career and Technology building houses the school's cosmetology class, along with a fully functional kitchen and dining area for culinary arts, a new athletic training room, weight room, electrical trades, and a girls' locker room.

Like the other high schools in the Socorro Independent School District, there is no stadium located on campus. Track and swim Meets and soccer and football games are played at the SISD Student Activities Complex.

== NJROTC ==
In August 1995, the MHS NJROTC (Naval Junior Reserve Officer Training Corps) was labeled by the chief of Naval Education and Training for being one of the top 10% out of the 85 western US schools.

== Sports ==
In December 1994, Montwood's varsity cross country team won its first district 2-5A Championship. Montwood Cheer is the only team in El Paso to have ever won a National Cheerleading Association title (2007). In March 2009, Montwood’s cheer squad participated in the American Showcase National Cheer-Off. Cheer received second place in the varsity large squad division. Cheer also participated in Jamfest in 2009 placing first in their division in San Antonio. In January 2010, cheer participated in the Battle of the Sun City placing first, with the best use of tumbling. This was Montwood's third consecutive win in the Battle of the Sun City Cheer competition. In 2013, Montwood had its first girls UIL State Champion in the sport of wrestling, accomplished by Natalia Hinojo.

== Robotics ==
Montwood High School's Robotics Team is consistently one of the highest ranked within the State of Texas. In previous years, the Robotics Team has advanced to the State and World competitions for the FIRST Tech Challenge. The Robotics Team was expected to compete in the World's competition in 2020, but was unable due to the COVID-19 pandemic. 2021 and 2022 saw the Montwood High School Robotics Team place 2nd in the State of Texas. As of 2023, Montwood is again expected to compete once again at the State FIRST Robotics Competition, as well as the World's Competition in Houston, Texas.

== Test scores ==
In 2009-2010 the Texas Assessment of Knowledge and Skills (TAKS) was used to test Montwood student in Math, Science, English and Social Studies. In 2010 9th graders had an 85% pass rate in Math and a 90% pass rate for English. Grade 10 had a 70% pass rate for Math a 75% pass rate for science and a 95% pass rate for Social Studies. For grade 11 there was a 95% pass rate for English, a 90% a 90% pass rate in Math and a 95% pass rate in Social Studies

== Enrollment ==
In 2011 Montwood had an enrollment of 90 freshmen,20 sophomores, 6 juniors and 100 seniors.

== Teaching rate ==
Total number of teachers- 114 Average teacher rating – 3.7 Schools Rating- 445

== Student ethnicity ==
- Caucasian- -10%
- Hispanic -90%
- African American-0%
- Asian American-0%
- Native American-0%

== Notable alumni ==
- Natasha Lacy, WNBA player
- Román Martínez, professional basketball player
- Claudia Ordaz Perez, a Democratic member of the Texas House of Representatives from District 76 (2021–Present)
- Gabe Vasquez, member of the United States House of Representatives
