= List of Houston Cougars head football coaches =

This List of Houston Cougars head football coaches includes those coaches who have led the Houston Cougars football team that represents the University of Houston in the sport of American football. The Houston Cougars currently compete in the Division I Football Bowl Subdivision (FBS) of the National Collegiate Athletic Association (NCAA) and have been members of the Big 12 Conference since the 2023 season. Eighteen men have served as the Cougars' head coach, including two who served as interim head coaches, since the Cougars began play in the fall of 1946. Willie Fritz was named head coach on December 3, 2023.

== Key ==
Key to symbols in coaches list
General		Overall		Conference		Postseason (Note: Although the first Rose Bowl Game was played in 1902, it has been continuously played since the 1916 game, and is recognized as the oldest bowl game by the NCAA. "—" indicates any season prior to 1916 when postseason games were not played.)	
No.	Order of coaches (Note: A running total of the number of head coaches, with coaches who served separate tenures being counted only once. Interim head coaches are represented with "Int" and are not counted in the running total. "—" indicates the team played but either without a coach or no coach is on record. "X" indicates an interim year without play.)	GC	Games coached	CW	Conference wins	PW	Postseason wins
DC	Division championships	OW	Overall wins	CL	Conference losses	PL	Postseason losses
CC	Conference championships	OL	Overall losses	CT	Conference ties	PT	Postseason ties
NC	National championships	OT	Overall ties (Note: Overtime rules in college football were introduced in 1996, making ties impossible in the period since.)	C%	Conference winning percentage		
†	Elected to the College Football Hall of Fame	O%	Overall winning percentage (Note: When computing the win–loss percentage, a tie counts as half a win and half a loss.)				

== Coaches ==
List of head football coaches showing season(s) coached, overall records, conference records, postseason records and championships (Note: Statistics updated through December 2025.)
No.	Name	Term	GC	OW	OL	OT	O%	CW	CL	CT	C%	PW	PL	PT	DCs (Note: Conference USA reorganized itself into two divisions in 2005. Under the C-USA format, the two divisional champions advance to the Conference USA Championship Game to determine the conference champion.)	CCs	NCs
1	Jewell Wallace	1946–1947	21	7	14	0	0.333	1	10	0	0.091	—	—	—	—	0	0
2	Clyde Lee	1948–1954	71	37	32	2	0.535	13	10	0	0.565	1	0	0	—	1	0
3	Bill Meek	1955–1956	20	13	6	1	0.675	6	2	0	0.750	—	—	—	—	1	0
4	Hal Lahar	1957–1961	49	24	23	2	0.510	8	3	0	0.727	—	—	—	—	2	0
5	Bill Yeoman^{†}	1962–1986	276	160	108	8	0.594	51	35	2	0.591	6	4	1	—	4	0
6	Jack Pardee^{†}	1987–1989	34	22	11	1	0.662	13	8	1	0.614	0	1	0	—	0	0
7	John Jenkins	1990–1992	33	18	15	0	0.545	12	11	0	0.522	—	—	—	—	0	0
8	Kim Helton	1993–1999	78	24	53	1	0.314	15	28	1	0.352	0	1	—	—	1	0
9	Dana Dimel	2000–2002	34	8	26	—	0.235	5	17	—	0.227	—	—	—	—	0	0
10	Art Briles	2003–2007	62	34	28	—	0.548	24	16	—	0.600	0	3	—	2	1	0
Int.	Chris Thurmond (Note: Chris Thurmond served as interim head coach for the 2007 Texas Bowl after Art Briles resigned his position to take the head coach position with the Baylor Bears.)	2007	1	0	1	—	.000	—	—	—	—	0	1	—	0	0	0
11	Kevin Sumlin	2008–2011	52	35	17	—	0.673	24	8	—	0.750	1	1	—	2	0	0
12	Tony Levine (Note: Tony Levine served as interim head coach for the 2012 TicketCity Bowl after Kevin Sumlin resigned his position to take the head coach position with the Texas A&M Aggies.)	2011–2014	38	21	17	—	0.553	14	10	—	0.583	1	1	—	0	0	0
Int.	David Gibbs	2014	1	1	0	—	1.000	—	—	—	—	1	0	—	0	0	0
13	Tom Herman	2015–2016	26	22	4	—	0.846	12	4	—	0.750	1	0	—	1	1	0
14	Major Applewhite (Note: Major Applewhite served as head coach for the 2016 Las Vegas Bowl after Tom Herman resigned his position to take the head coach position with the Texas Longhorns.)	2016–2018	26	15	11	—	0.577	10	6	—	0.625	0	3	—	1	0	0
15	Dana Holgorsen	2019–2023	59	31	28	—	0.525	20	19	—	0.513	2	1	—	0	0	0
16	Willie Fritz	2024–present	25	14	11	—	0.560	9	9	—	0.500	1	0	—	0	0	0
Totals			906	486	405	15	0.545					14	16	1	6	11	0

Remark: Not included in the above listing is Todd Orlando, who was designated interim head coach for a brief period in 2016 but did not coach any games.

== See also ==
- List of College Football Hall of Fame inductees (coaches)
