= Virgil Ballard =

American basketball coach

Biographical details
- Born: December 18, 1903; De Leon, Texas, U.S.
- Died: August 23, 1990 (aged 86); Fort Davis, Texas, U.S.
- Education: Austin College

Coaching career (HC unless noted)

Football
- 1934: Texas Tech (assistant)

Basketball
- 1934–1935: Texas Tech

Charles Virgil Ballard (December 18, 1903 – August 23, 1990) was the fifth head coach of the Texas Tech Red Raiders basketball team during the Matador's 1934–35 season. He garnered a 15–9 record, including the team's 100th win, a one-point victory over House of David. Ballard also served as an assistant football coach under Texas Tech head coach Pete Cawthon during the Matador's 1934 season.
