= Chris Walker (basketball, born 1969) =

American basketball player and coach

Biographical details
- Born: December 25, 1969 (age 56)

Playing career
- 1988–1992: Villanova
- Position: Point guard

Coaching career (HC unless noted)
- 1992–1996: Loyola Marymount (asst.)
- 1996–1999: Vanderbilt (assoc. HC)
- 1999–2000: Pepperdine (assoc. HC)
- 2000–2001: Villanova (asst.)
- 2001–2005: UMass (asst.)
- 2007–2009: New Mexico (asst.)
- 2009–2011: Villanova (asst.)
- 2011–2012: Texas Tech (assoc. HC)
- 2012–2013: Texas Tech (interim HC)
- 2017–2019: California (asst.)

Head coaching record
- Overall: 11–20 (.355)

Chris Walker (born December 25, 1969) is an American college basketball coach and former player. He served as interim head coach of the Texas Tech Red Raiders during the 2012–13 season following the forced resignation of Billy Gillispie. After Tubby Smith was named Gillispie's permanent successor in 2013, Walker returned to his previous post as associate head coach. Walker is now an analyst at CBSSN, a position he took in 2019 after having served as an assistant coach at California under Wyking Jones.

== Head coaching record ==
Record table
Season	Team	Overall	Conference	Standing	Postseason
Texas Tech Red Raiders (Big 12 Conference) (2012–2013)
2012–13	Texas Tech	11–20	3–15	9th	
Texas Tech:		11–20 (.355)	3–15 (.167)		
Total:		11–20 (.355)			
National champion Postseason invitational champion Conference regular season champion Conference regular season and conference tournament champion Division regular season champion Division regular season and conference tournament champion Conference tournament champion
