= Gary Ashby =

American baseball coach

Biographical details
- Born: 1955 (age 70–71); Lubbock, Texas, U.S.

Playing career
- 1976–77: Texas Tech University
- 1977: San Diego Padres

Coaching career (HC unless noted)
- 1982–83: Texas Tech (AC)
- 1984–86: Texas Tech

Gary W. Ashby (born 1955) was the head coach of the Texas Tech Red Raiders baseball team from 1984 to 1986.

Ashby's ties with Texas Tech were made long before becoming the head coach. Ashby had a dominant high school career under the highly touted high school baseball coach Bobby Moegle who has been inducted into the Texas Sports Hall of Fame. In 1972, Ashby hit .429 as a starter and helped them secure the first of Moegle's four state championships.

Once Ashby graduated, he continued his playing days at Texas Tech. He started every year in his four-year career with the Red Raiders and now holds single season records in home runs, rbis and doubles to go along with earning NCAA All-American honors in his senior year. After being drafted by the Padres he played five years in the minor leagues before retiring.

Ashby then returned to Red Raiders as an assistant coach in 1982 and 1983. He would then take over as head coach from 1984 to 1986. This would be his final coaching gig at the collegiate level.

== Biography ==
Ashby was born in Lubbock, Texas and graduated from Monterey High School. He played college baseball at Texas Tech University and was All-Region in 1976 and All-American in 1977. He was drafted by the San Diego Padres in the 22nd round of the 1977 Major League Baseball Amateur Draft.

Ashby served as assistant coach at Texas Tech from 1982 to 1983, before serving as head coach. He was elected into the Texas Tech Athletic Hall of Honor in 1999.
