= Berl Huffman =

American college sports coach (1907–1990)

- Huffman in 1939

Biographical details
- Born: August 27, 1907; Texas, U.S.
- Died: October 16, 1990 (aged 83); Lubbock, Texas, U.S.

Coaching career (HC unless noted)

Football
- 1936–1942: Texas Tech (assistant)
- 1943–1944: Keesler Field
- 1945: AAF Training Command (backfield)
- 1947–1949: New Mexico

Basketball
- 1935–1942: Texas Tech
- 1946–1947: Texas Tech
- 1951–1952: New Mexico

Baseball
- 1961–1967: Texas Tech

Head coaching record
- Overall: 19–24–3 (football); 126–87 (basketball); 80–88 (baseball)

George Berl Huffman (August 27, 1907 – October 16, 1990) was an American college football, college basketball, and college baseball, coach. He coached at Texas Tech University and the University of New Mexico.

== Coaching career ==
=== Baseball ===
Huffman was the fourth head coach of the Texas Tech Red Raiders baseball program. From the 1961 through the 1967 seasons, Huffman coached 167 games with an 80–87 record.

=== Basketball ===
In eight seasons as the head basketball coach at Texas Tech, Huffman garnered a record of 121–67. The record for his one season coaching basketball at New Mexico stands at 6–19.

=== Football ===
From 1936 to 1942, Huffman was an assistant coach with Texas Tech.

== Head coaching record ==
=== Football ===
Year	Team	Overall	Conference	Standing	Bowl/playoffs
Keesler Field Commandos/Fliers (Independent) (1943–1944)
1943	Keesler Field	3–1			
1944	Keesler Field	8–1–2			
Keesler Field:		11–2–2			
New Mexico Lobos (Border Conference) (1947–1949)
1947	New Mexico	4–5–1	1–5–1	7th	
1948	New Mexico	2–9	1–6	8th	
1949	New Mexico	2–8	1–6	8th	
New Mexico:		8–22–1	3–17–1		
Total:		19–24–3			
