= Victor Payne =

American basketball and football coach (1899–1981)

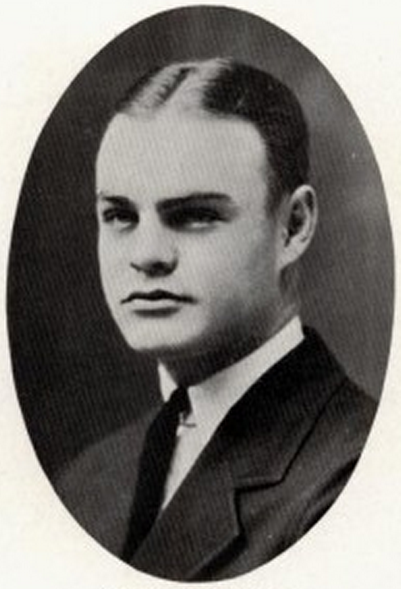
- Payne pictured in Prickly Pear 1923, Abilene Christian yearbook

Biographical details
- Born: July 3, 1899; Texas, U.S.
- Died: October 26, 1981 (aged 82); Abilene, Texas, U.S.

Playing career

Football
- 1919: Simmons (TX)
- 1920: Abilene Christian
- 1921: Bethany (WV)
- Position: Halfback

Coaching career (HC unless noted)

Football
- 1922–1923: Abilene Christian
- 1926: Simmons (TX)
- 1927–1928: Texas Tech (assistant)

Basketball
- 1922–1924: Abilene Christian
- 1927–1930: Texas Tech

Head coaching record
- Overall: 18–4–3 (football); 32–20 (basketball)

Accomplishments and honors

Championships
- Football; 1 Texas Conference (1926)

Victor Duane Payne Jr. (July 3, 1899 – October 26, 1981) was an American college basketball and college football coach. He was the head football coach at Abilene Christian College and Simmons University. Payne was also the basketball head coach at Texas Technological College—now known as Texas Tech University.

== Coaching career ==
=== Football ===
==== Abilene Christian ====
Payne was the fourth head college football coach at Abilene Christian University in Abilene, Texas, and he held that position for two seasons, from 1922 until 1923. During his time at Abilene Christian, Sam Cox of Ozona, Texas, sent him a young wildcat named Bob Thomas to serve as a live athletics mascot for the college.

Payne's coaching record at Abilene Christian was 12–3.

==== Simmons ====
Payne coached the Simmons Cowboys football team to 6–1–3 in 1926.

==== Texas Tech ====
Payne served as an assistant coach during the 1927 and 1928 seasons under Texas Tech head coach Ewing Y. Freeland.

=== Basketball ===
==== Texas Tech ====
Payne coached the Texas Tech Matadors (now known as the Red Raiders) from 1927 to 1930. During the first season, the team won ten games and lost six. The following season, the record was slightly worse at 9–8. During his final season, the team improved to 13–6. Payne's overall record at Texas Tech stands at 32 wins and 20 losses.

== Later life ==
In 1949, he was working for the Abilene Savings and Loan Company.

== Head coaching record ==
=== Football ===
Year	Team	Overall	Conference	Standing	Bowl/playoffs
Abilene Christian Wildcats (Independent) (1922–1923)
1922	Abilene Christian	6–2			
1923	Abilene Christian	6–1			
Abilene Christian:		12–3			
Simmons Cowboys (Texas Conference) (1926)
1926	Simmons	6–1–3	2–0–1	1st	
Simmons:		6–1–3	2–0–1		
Total:		18–4–3			
National championship Conference title Conference division title or championship game berth
