= Dell Morgan =

American sports player and coach (1900–1962)

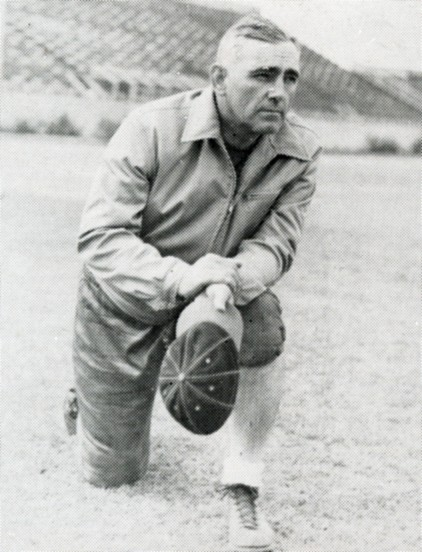
- Morgan in 1945

Biographical details
- Born: February 14, 1900; Weatherford, Texas, U.S.
- Died: March 3, 1962 (aged 62) near Bay City, Texas, U.S.

Playing career
- c. 1925: Austin
- Position: Tackle

Coaching career (HC unless noted)

Football
- 1925: Austin (assistant)
- 1930–1933: Texas Tech (assistant)
- 1934–1939: Auburn (line)
- 1940: Rice (line)
- 1941–1950: Texas Tech

Basketball
- 1931–1934: Texas Tech

Baseball
- 1926: Austin
- 1934–1939: Auburn
- 1953–1961: Rice

Head coaching record
- Overall: 55–49–3 (football); 42–29 (basketball); 146–143–2 (baseball, excluding Austin)
- Bowls: 0–3

Accomplishments and honors

Championships
- Football; 4 Border (1942, 1947–1949)

John O'Dell Morgan (February 14, 1900 – March 3, 1962) was an American football player and coach of football, basketball and baseball. He served as the head football coach at Texas Tech University from 1941 to 1950, compiling a record of 55–49–3. Morgan was also the head basketball coach at Texas Tech from 1931 to 1934, tallying a mark of 42–29. In addition, he was the head baseball coach at Auburn University from 1934 to 1939 and at Rice University from 1953 to 1961, amassing a career college baseball coaching record of 146–143–2.

== Coaching career ==
Morgan was the head coach of the Texas Tech Red Raiders basketball from 1931 to 1934. During the same time, Morgan also served as an assistant coach to the football team. His record during that time was 42–29. Morgan was later the head coach of the Texas Tech Red Raiders football team from 1941 to 1950. During his tenure, he compiled a 55–49–3 record. In four of his last five seasons, he posted a winning record. His best season came in 1941, when his team went 9–2.

== Death ==
Morgan was killed in car accident near Bay City, Texas on March 3, 1962.

== Head coaching record ==
=== Football ===
Year	Team	Overall	Conference	Standing	Bowl/playoffs
Texas Tech Red Raiders (Border Conference) (1941–1950)
1941	Texas Tech	9–2	2–0	2nd	L Sun
1942	Texas Tech	4–5–1	3–0–1	T–1st	
1943	Texas Tech	4–6			
1944	Texas Tech	4–7	2–0		
1945	Texas Tech	3–5–2	1–0–1		
1946	Texas Tech	8–3	3–1	2nd	
1947	Texas Tech	6–5	4–0	1st	L Sun
1948	Texas Tech	7–3	5–0	1st	
1949	Texas Tech	7–5	5–0	1st	L Raisin
1950	Texas Tech	3–8	3–2	4th	
Washington:		55–49–3	28–3–2		
Total:		55–49–3			
National championship Conference title Conference division title or championship game berth
