= Gerald Myers =

American former college basketball coach (born 1936)

Biographical details
- Born: August 5, 1936; Borger, Texas, U.S.

Playing career
- 1956–1959: Texas Tech
- Position: Guard

Coaching career (HC unless noted)
- 1959–1966: Monterey HS (TX)
- 1967–1970: Houston Baptist
- 1970–1971: Texas Tech (assistant)
- 1971–1991: Texas Tech

Administrative career (AD unless noted)
- 1991–1996: Texas Tech (asst. AD)
- 1996–2011: Texas Tech

Head coaching record
- Overall: 358–304 (college); 150–48 (high school)
- Tournaments: 1–4 (NCAA Division I); 0–1 (NIT)

Accomplishments and honors

Championships
- 3 SWC tournament (1976, 1985, 1986); 2 SWC regular season (1973, 1985)

Awards
- 5× SWC Coach of the Year (1973, 1979, 1983, 1985, 1986)

Gerald Myers (born August 5, 1936) was an American former college basketball coach. He was the head coach of the Texas Tech Red Raiders men's basketball team and the Houston Baptist Huskies men's basketball team and athletic director at Texas Tech University.

== Early years ==
Originally from Borger, Texas, Myers played basketball for Texas Tech from 1956–1959. As a player, he had an 86.9 percent free throw shooting average for the 1957-58 season. He received a bachelor's degree in education from Texas Tech in 1959 and later earned a master's degree in 1965.

== Career ==
Myers coached basketball for Monterey High School in Lubbock, Texas from 1959 through 1966, posting an impressive 150-48 record at the high school.

=== Houston Baptist ===
In 1967, Myers became the second head coach of the Houston Baptist Huskies men's basketball program. Beginning with Myers' first season as head coach, the Huskies competed in the NCAA Division II after 4 seasons in the National Association of Intercollegiate Athletics. At the end of the 1969–70 season, Myers resigned to accept the position of assistant coach with the Texas Tech Red Raiders basketball program, where he played collegiality. In three seasons, Myers posted an overall record of 32–43.

=== Texas Tech ===
In 1970, Myers became an assistant coach for the Red Raiders before being named interim head coach following the resignation of Bob Bass only 13 games into the season.

He became head coach of the team during the 1970–71 basketball season and held this position for twenty years. Under Myers, the Red Raiders won two conference championships, five conference tournaments, and earned four trips to the NCAA Men's Division I Basketball Championship. Myers was named SWC Coach of the Year five times, winning the award more times than any other coach.

After resigning as head coach of the Red Raider basketball team, Myers became assistant athletic director at Texas Tech. In June 1996, Myers was named interim Athletic Director following the resignation of Bob Bockrath to take the same position at the University of Alabama. On February 17, 1997, Myers was announced as the university's permanent athletic director after being named sole finalist for the position. On August 26, 2010, Myers announced his retirement and was replaced by Kirby Hocutt on May 31, 2011.

== Head coaching record ==
Record table
Season	Team	Overall	Conference	Standing	Postseason
Houston Baptist Huskies (NCAA Division II Independent) (1967–1970)
1967–68	Houston Baptist	6–20			
1968–69	Houston Baptist	16–12			
1969–70	Houston Baptist	10–11			
Houston Baptist:		32–43			
Texas Tech Red Raiders (Southwest Conference) (1971–1991)
1970–71	Texas Tech	8–5 (Note: Bob Bass resigned after the first 13 games of the 1970–71 season. Myers was named interim head coach for final 13 games.)	8–5	T–3rd	
1971–72	Texas Tech	14–12	8–6	5th	
1972–73	Texas Tech	19–8	12–2	1st	NCAA University Division first round
1973–74	Texas Tech	17–9	10–4	2nd	
1974–75	Texas Tech	18–8	11–3	T–2nd	
1975–76	Texas Tech	25–6	13–3	2nd	NCAA Division I Sweet 16
1976–77	Texas Tech	20–9	12–4	3rd	
1977–78	Texas Tech	19–10	10–6	4th	
1978–79	Texas Tech	19–11	9–7	T–4th	NIT first round
1979–80	Texas Tech	16–13	8–8	T–4th	
1980–81	Texas Tech	15–13	8–8	T–4th	
1981–82	Texas Tech	17–11	8–8	6th	
1982–83	Texas Tech	12–19	7–9	6th	
1983–84	Texas Tech	17–12	10–6	4th	
1984–85	Texas Tech	23–8	12–4	1st	NCAA Division I first round
1985–86	Texas Tech	17–14	9–7	5th	NCAA Division I first round
1986–87	Texas Tech	15–14	9–7	T–3rd	
1987–88	Texas Tech	9–19	4–12	T–7th	
1988–89	Texas Tech	13–15	8–8	T–4th	
1989–90	Texas Tech	5–22	0–16	9th	
1990–91	Texas Tech	8–23	4–12	T–7th	
Texas Tech:		326–261	180–145		
Total:		358–304			
National champion Postseason invitational champion Conference regular season champion Conference regular season and conference tournament champion Division regular season champion Division regular season and conference tournament champion Conference tournament champion
