= W. L. Golightly =

American basketball coach

- W. L. Golightly during his time at Texas Tech

Biographical details
- Born: February 19, 1900; Crowley, Texas, U.S.
- Died: September 3, 1974 (aged 74); Atlanta, Georgia, U.S.

Coaching career (HC unless noted)

Football
- 1930: Texas Tech (assistant)

Basketball
- 1930–1931: Texas Tech

Head coaching record
- Overall: 11–9

William Leslie "Crip" Golightly (February 19, 1900 – September 3, 1974) was a college basketball head coach.

== Texas Tech ==
Golightly coached the Texas Tech Matadors basketball team (now known as the Red Raiders) during the 1930–31 season. His record with the team is 11–9. Golightly also served as an assistant football coach at Texas Tech under Pete Cawthon during the 1930 season.
