= Polk Robison =

American basketball player and coach (1912–2008)

- Robison in 1945

Biographical details
- Born: May 24, 1912; Tennessee, U.S.
- Died: June 27, 2008 (aged 96)

Playing career

Basketball
- 1933–1935: Texas Tech

Coaching career (HC unless noted)

Basketball
- 1942–1946: Texas Tech
- 1947–1961: Texas Tech

Football
- 1943–1948: Texas Tech (assistant)

Administrative career (AD unless noted)
- 1960–1970: Texas Tech

Head coaching record
- Overall: 254–195

Polk Robison (May 24, 1912 – June 27, 2008) was an American collegiate basketball and football coach and college athletics administrator who served as the head coach of the Texas Tech Red Raiders basketball team from 1942 to 1946 and again from 1947 to 1961. He served as the university's athletic director from 1961 to 1971.

== Student ==
As a student at Texas Tech, Robison tried out for the football team but did not make the cut. However, he did letter in basketball and tennis. After graduating in 1934, he helped coach football and tennis in the 1940s.

== Head basketball coach ==
Robison coached the Red Raiders basketball teams to their first NCAA tournament appearances—in 1954, 1956, and 1961. His overall record at the school was 254–195.

== Athletic director ==
After stepping down from his coaching position in 1961, Robison served as the athletic director at Texas Tech until 1971. He served six more years on the athletics staff as the Athletic Administrator of Finance and Development before finally retiring in 1977.

To honor Robison's years of service, the Polk Robison Men's Basketball Hall of Honor was created in 2003. It is located on the north side of the main lobby of United Supermarkets Arena.

== Death ==
Robison died of natural causes on Friday, June 27, 2008 at the age of 96.

== Head coaching record ==
Record table
Season	Team	Overall	Conference	Standing	Postseason
Texas Tech Red Raiders (Border Intercollegiate Athletic Association) (1942–1946)
1942–43	Texas Tech	13–11	4–5	3rd	
1943–44	Texas Tech	5–18	0–3	2nd	
1944–45	Texas Tech	10–14	7–6	5th	
1945–46	Texas Tech	15–10	7–4	3rd	
Texas Tech Red Raiders (Border Intercollegiate Athletic Association) (1947–1956)
1947–48	Texas Tech	16–12	10–6	2nd	
1948–49	Texas Tech	21–9			
1949–50	Texas Tech	14–12			
1950–51	Texas Tech	14–14	10–6	3rd	
1951–52	Texas Tech	14–10	9–5	3rd	
1952–53	Texas Tech	12–10	9–5	4th	
1953–54	Texas Tech	20–5	11–1	1st	NCAA First Round
1954–55	Texas Tech	18–7	9–3	T–1st	
1955–56	Texas Tech	13–12	8–4	1st	NCAA First Round
Texas Tech Red Raiders (Independent) (1956–1957)
1956–57	Texas Tech	12–11			
Texas Tech Red Raiders (Southwest Conference) (1957–1961)
1957–58	Texas Tech	15–8	8–6	T–3rd	
1958–59	Texas Tech	15–9	8–6	3rd	
1959–60	Texas Tech	10–14	7–7	T–4th	
1960–61	Texas Tech	15–10	11–3	1st	NCAA Sweet Sixteen
Texas Tech:		252–196 (.563)			
Total:		252–196 (.563)			
National champion Postseason invitational champion Conference regular season champion Conference regular season and conference tournament champion Division regular season champion Division regular season and conference tournament champion Conference tournament champion
