= Gene Gibson =

American basketball player and coach (1924–2007)

Current position
- Title: Head coach

Biographical details
- Born: September 24, 1924
- Died: May 26, 2007 (aged 82); Plano, Texas

Coaching career (HC unless noted)
- 1961–1969: Texas Tech

Head coaching record
- Overall: 101–91

Eugene F. Gibson (1924–2007) coached the Texas Tech Red Raiders men's basketball team from 1961 to 1969. A former all-conference player for Texas Tech, during his first year as coach, he led the team to the second round of the NCAA tournament. He completed his coaching career with a record of 101–91 and the third-most conference victories in Tech's history.

Gibson died on May 26, 2007, in Plano, Texas.
