= Texas Tech Red Raiders basketball statistical leaders =

The Texas Tech Red Raiders basketball statistical leaders are individual statistical leaders of the Texas Tech Red Raiders basketball program in various categories, including points, three-pointers, assists, blocks, rebounds, and steals. Within those areas, the lists identify single-game, single-season, and career leaders. The Red Raiders represent Texas Tech University in the NCAA's Big 12 Conference.

Texas Tech began competing in intercollegiate basketball in 1925. However, the school's record book does not generally list records from before the 1950s, as records from before this period are often incomplete and inconsistent. Since scoring was much lower in this era, and teams played much fewer games during a typical season, it is likely that few or no players from this era would appear on these lists anyway.

The NCAA did not officially record assists as a stat until the 1983–84 season, and blocks and steals until the 1985–86 season, but Texas Tech's record books includes players in these stats before these seasons. These lists are updated through the end of the 2020–21 season.

== Scoring ==
Career
Rk	Player	Points	Seasons
1	Andre Emmett	2256	2000–01 2001–02 2002–03 2003–04
2	Jarrius Jackson	2221	2003–04 2004–05 2005–06 2006–07
3	Rick Bullock	2118	1972–73 1973–74 1974–75 1975–76
4	Jason Sasser	2102	1992–93 1993–94 1994–95 1995–96
5	Martin Zeno	1913	2004–05 2005–06 2006–07 2007–08
6	Cory Carr	1904	1994–95 1995–96 1996–97 1997–98
7	John Roberson	1772	2007–08 2008–09 2009–10 2010–11
8	Lance Hughes	1762	1991–92 1992–93 1993–94 1994–95
9	Bubba Jennings	1760	1980–81 1981–82 1982–83 1983–84 1984–85
10	Jim Reed	1689	1952–53 1953–54 1954–55 1955–56

Season
Rk	Player	Points	Season
1	Andre Emmett	741	2002–03
2	Rick Bullock	708	1975–76
3	Jarrett Culver	704	2018–19
4	Andre Emmett	701	2003–04
5	Jarrius Jackson	677	2006–07
6	Jarrius Jackson	657	2005–06
7	Cory Carr	646	1996–97
8	Mike Russell	643	1976–77
9	Greg Lowery	636	1971–72
10	Keenan Evans	633	2017–18

Single game
Rk	Player	Points	Season	Opponent
1	Dub Malaise	50	1965–66	Texas
2	Will Flemons	47	1992–93	Oral Roberts
3	Rick Bullock	44	1975–76	Arkansas
4	Mike Singletary	43	2008–09	Texas A&M
	Dub Malaise	43	1965–66	TCU
6	Mike Russell	42	1976–77	Texas A&M
7	Jarrius Jackson	41	2005–06	Nebraska
	Rayford Young	41	1998–99	Kansas
	Rick Bullock	41	1973–74	TCU
	Jim Reed	41	1954–55	Furman
	JT Toppin	41	2024-25	Arizona State

== Rebounds ==
Career
Rk	Player	Rebounds	Seasons
1	Jim Reed	1333	1952–53 1953–54 1954–55 1955–56
2	Paul Nolen	1104	1950–51 1951–52 1952–53
3	Rick Bullock	1057	1972–73 1973–74 1974–75 1975–76
4	Will Flemons	934	1989–90 1990–91 1991–92 1992–93
5	Jason Sasser	895	1992–93 1993–94 1994–95 1995–96
6	Eugene Carpenter	840	1953–54 1954–55 1955–56
7	Andre Emmett	765	2000–01 2001–02 2002–03 2003–04
8	Mike Russell	744	1975–76 1976–77 1977–78
9	Tony Battie	724	1994–95 1995–96 1996–97
10	Mike Singletary	698	2007–08 2008–09 2009–10 2010–11

Season
Rk	Player	Rebounds	Season
1	Paul Nolen	492	1950–51
2	Jim Reed	407	1954–55
3	Tony Battie	329	1996–97
4	Will Flemons	324	1992–93
5	Jim Reed	323	1952–53
6	Rick Bullock	322	1975–76
7	Eugene Carpenter	321	1954–55
8	Paul Nolen	318	1951–52
9	JT Toppin	310	2024–25
10	Jim Reed	306	1953–54

Single game
Rk	Player	Rebounds	Season	Opponent
1	Jim Reed	27	1955–56	Texas
	Jim Reed	27	1955–56	Eastern New Mexico
3	Jim Reed	26	1954–55	Furman
4	Jim Reed	24	1954–55	Hardin-Simmons
5	Jim Reed	23	1952–53	New Mexico State
	Jim Reed	23	1952–53	Hardin-Simmons
	Eugene Carpenter	23	1955–56	Arizona State
	Will Flemons	23	1989–90	Houston
9	Rick Bullock	22	1974–75	Adams State
	Bob Glover	22	1965–66	Arizona
	Eugene Carpenter	22	1955–56	New Mexico State
	Eugene Carpenter	22	1955–56	Loyola-New Orleans
	Jim Reed	22	1953–54	McMurry

== Assists ==
Career
Rk	Player	Assists	Seasons
1	John Roberson	636	2007–08 2008–09 2009–10 2010–11
2	Stan Bonewitz	435	1995–96 1996–97 1997–98 1998–99
3	Sean Gay	432	1985–86 1986–87 1987–88 1988–89
4	Rayford Young	407	1996–97 1997–98 1998–99 1999–00
5	Martin Zeno	403	2004–05 2005–06 2006–07 2007–08
6	Bubba Jennings	378	1980–81 1981–82 1982–83 1983–84 1984–85
7	Jarrius Jackson	357	2003–04 2004–05 2005–06 2006–07
8	Keenan Evans	346	2014–15 2015–16 2016–17 2017–18
9	Tony Benford	341	1982–83 1983–84 1984–85 1985–86
10	Bryant Moore	335	1990–91 1991–92

Season
Rk	Player	Assists	Season
1	Christian Anderson Jr.	244	2025–26
2	Elijah Hawkins	226	2024–25
3	John Roberson	212	2008–09
4	John Roberson	190	2009–10
5	Jason Martin	182	1995–96
6	Bryant Moore	179	1991–92
7	Jamal Brown	175	2000–01
8	Bryant Moore	156	1990–91
9	Kasib Powell	151	2002–03
	Stan Bonewitz	151	1996–97

Single game
Rk	Player	Assists	Season	Opponent
1	Stan Bonewitz	14	1996–97	Fresno State
2	John Roberson	13	2008–09	Texas A&M
	Stan Bonewitz	13	1996–97	New Mexico State
	Mark Davis	13	1994–95	TCU
	Christian Anderson Jr.	13	2025–26	Oklahoma State
6	Christian Anderson Jr.	12	2025–26	Utah
	Elijah Hawkins	12	2024–25	Arizona
	Joe Toussaint	12	2023–24	Butler
	John Roberson	12	2010–11	Iowa State
	John Roberson	12	2009–10	Texas A&M
	Mark Davis	12	1993–94	Texas A&M
	Bryant Moore	12	1990–91	SMU

== Steals ==
Career
Rk	Player	Steals	Seasons
1	Ronald Ross	204	2001–02 2002–03 2003–04 2004–05
2	Jarrius Jackson	196	2003–04 2004–05 2005–06 2006–07
	Sean Gay	196	1985–86 1986–87 1987–88 1988–89
4	Rayford Young	173	1996–97 1997–98 1998–99 1999–00
5	Martin Zeno	168	2004–05 2005–06 2006–07 2007–08
6	Andre Emmett	164	2000–01 2001–02 2002–03 2003–04
7	Bubba Jennings	156	1980–81 1981–82 1982–83 1983–84 1984–85
8	Jason Sasser	144	1992–93 1993–94 1994–95 1995–96
9	John Roberson	135	2007–08 2008–09 2009–10 2010–11
10	Keenan Evans	128	2014–15 2015–16 2016–17 2017–18

Season
Rk	Player	Steals	Season
1	Ronald Ross	86	2004–05
2	Matt Mooney	70	2018–19
3	Andre Emmett	64	2002–03
4	Jarrius Jackson	62	2003–04
5	Josh Gray	61	2012–13
6	Jarrett Culver	57	2018–19
7	Ronald Ross	56	2002–03
8	Bryant Moore	55	1991–92
9	Sean Gay	54	1985–86
	Elijah Hawkins	54	2024–25

Single game
Rk	Player	Steals	Season	Opponent
1	Josh Gray	7	2012–13	Jackson State
	Ronald Ross	7	2004–05	UTEP
	Nick Valdez	7	2002–03	UTEP
4	Cruz Davis	6	2026–27	Jackson State
	De'Vion Harmon	6	2022–23	Eastern Washington
	Jarrett Culver	6	2018–19	Rice
	Jaye Crockett	6	2012–13	West Virginia
	Nick Okorie	6	2009–10	Kansas
	Martin Zeno	6	2006–07	Oklahoma State
	Jarrius Jackson	6	2005–06	Texas-Pan American
	Ronald Ross	6	2003–04	Baylor
	Ronald Ross	6	2002–03	San Diego State
	Andre Emmett	6	2002–03	Oklahoma State
	Will Chavis	6	2002–03	Iowa State
	Andre Emmett	6	2002–03	Nicholls State
	Jason Sasser	6	1993–94	BYU
	Lance Hughes	6	1993–94	Wisconsin
	Jeff Taylor	6	1978–79	Arkansas
	Mike Edwards	6	1977–78	Houston

== Blocks ==
Career
Rk	Player	Blocks	Seasons
1	Tony Battie	162	1994–95 1995–96 1996–97
2	Zach Smith	158	2014–15 2015–16 2016–17 2017–18
3	Rick Bullock	149	1972–73 1973–74 1974–75 1975–76
4	Will Flemons	109	1989–90 1990–91 1991–92 1992–93
5	Devonne Giles	107	2003–04 2004–05
6	Brodney Kennard	106	1998–99 1999–00
7	Robert Lewandowski	101	2008–09 2009–10 2010–11 2011–12
8	Andy Ellis	100	1998–99 1999–00 2000–01 2001–02
9	Vince Taylor	99	1981–82 1982–83 1983–84 1984–85
10	D’Walyn Roberts	97	2007–08 2008–09 2009–10 2010–11

Season
Rk	Player	Blocks	Season
1	Tariq Owens	92	2018–19
2	Tony Battie	71	1996–97
3	Brodney Kennard	69	1999–00
4	Tony Battie	68	1995–96
5	Devonne Giles	56	2004–05
6	Andy Ellis	55	2001–02
7	Devonne Giles	51	2003–04
8	JT Toppin	48	2024–25
9	Zach Smith	47	2015–16
10	Zach Smith	45	2014–15

Single game
Rk	Player	Blocks	Season	Opponent
1	Tariq Owens	8	2018–19	Memphis
2	Will Flemons	7	1989–90	Texas A&M
3	Nimari Burnett	6	2020–21	Grambling
	Tariq Owens	6	2018–19	Incarnate Word
	Jaye Crockett	6	2010–11	Texas A&M-Corpus Christi
	Dior Lowhorn	6	2005–06	UTEP
	Devonne Giles	6	2004–05	UTEP
	Tony Battie	6	1996–97	Texas
	Tony Battie	6	1995–96	Texas A&M
	Tony Battie	6	1995–96	TCU
	Rick Bullock	6	1973–74	New Mexico
	Rick Bullock	6	1972–73	Saint Louis
