= Flemons =

Flemons is a surname. Notable people with the surname include:

- Dom Flemons (born 1982), American multi-instrumentalist and singer-songwriter
- Ronald Flemons (born 1979), American football player
- Wade Flemons (1940–1993), American singer
- Will Flemons, American basketball player
