= Southwest Conference Men's Basketball Player of the Year =

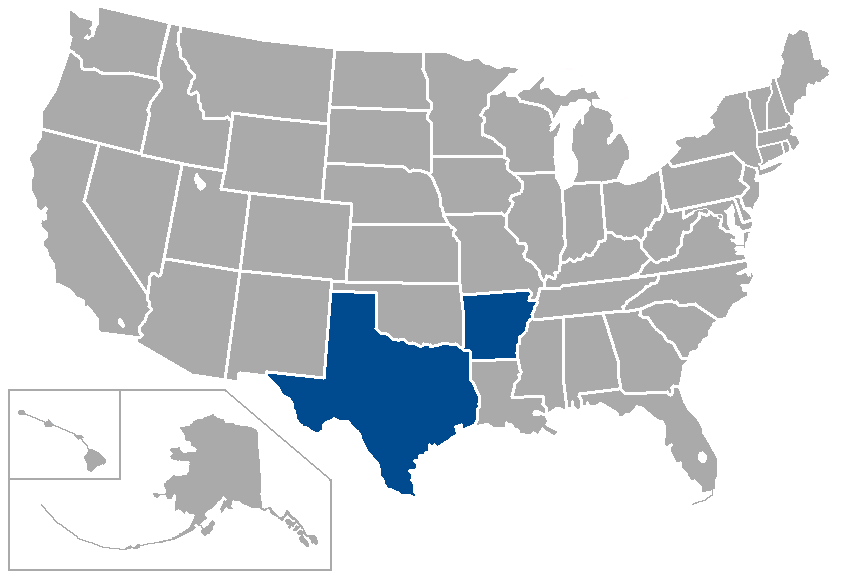
- Awarded for: the most outstanding basketball player in the Southwest Conference
- Country: United States

History
- First award: 1958
- Final award: 1996

The Southwest Conference Men's Basketball Player of the Year was an annual award given to the Southwest Conference (SWC)'s most outstanding player. The award was first given following the 1957–58 season and concluded after the 1995–96 season (the SWC disbanded with four members establishing the Big 12 Conference, three members joining the Western Athletic Conference, and one joining Conference USA).

== Key ==
†	Co-Players of the Year
*	Awarded a national player of the year award that same season: Helms Foundation College Basketball Player of the Year (1904–05 to 1978–79); UPI College Basketball Player of the Year (1954–55 to 1995–96); Oscar Robertson Trophy (1958–59 to present); Naismith College Player of the Year (1968–69 to present); John R. Wooden Award (1976–77 to present)
Player (X)	Denotes the number of times the player has been awarded the Southwest Player of the Year award at that point

== Winners ==
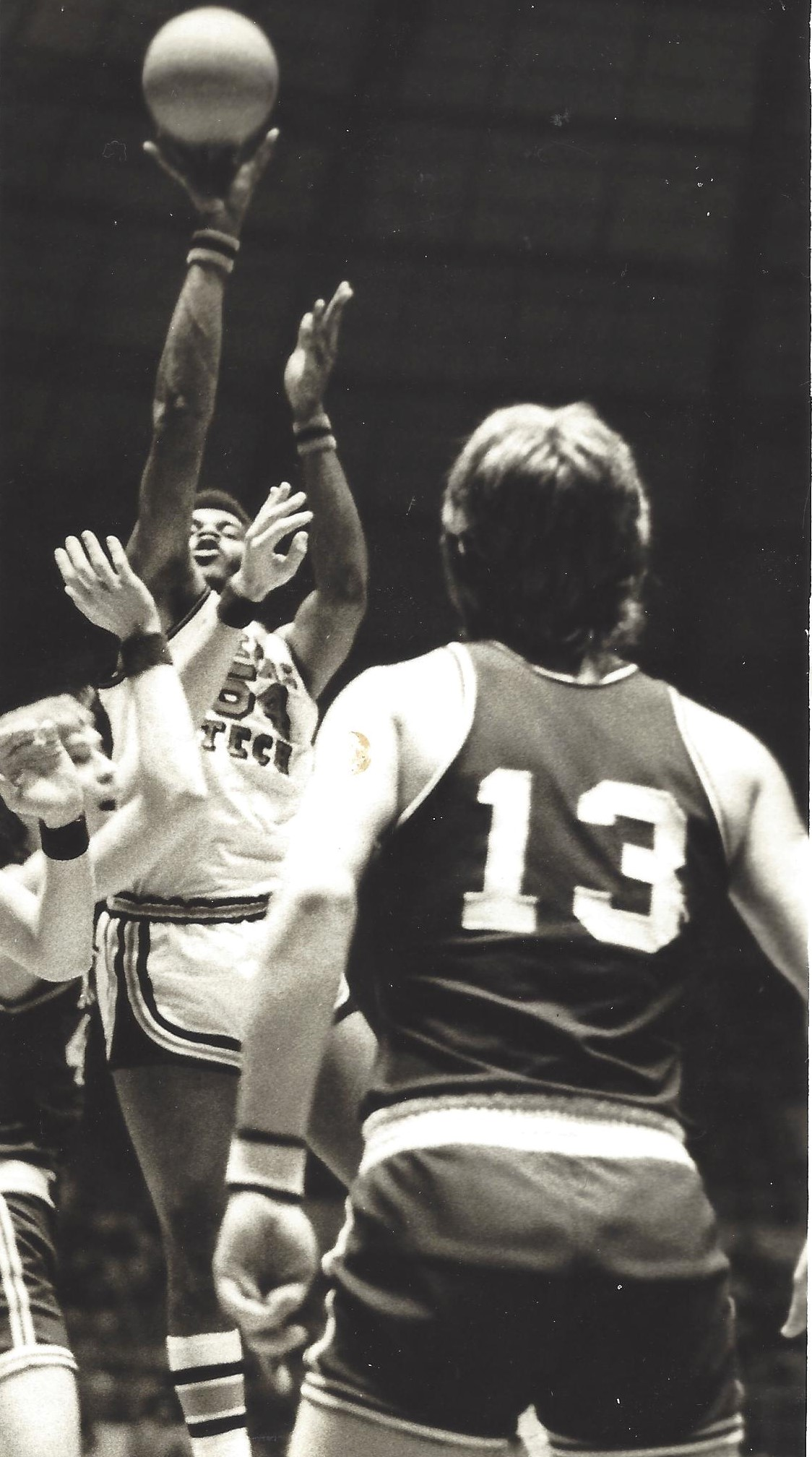
Rick Bullock of Texas Tech won in 1975.

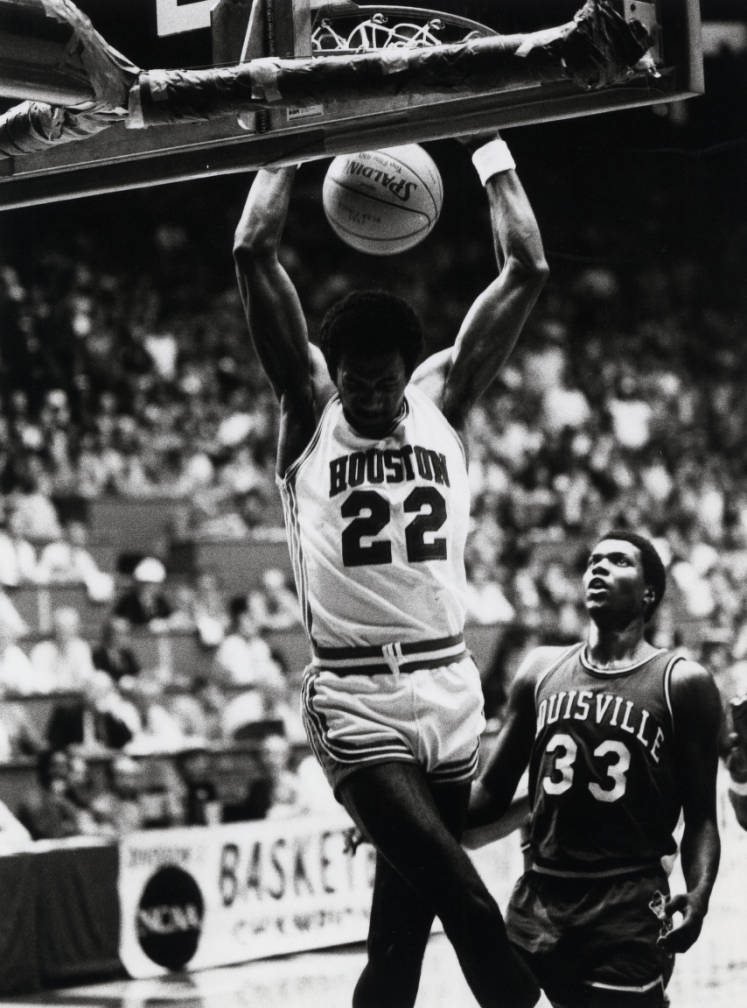
Clyde Drexler of Houston shared the 1983 award with Darrell Walker.

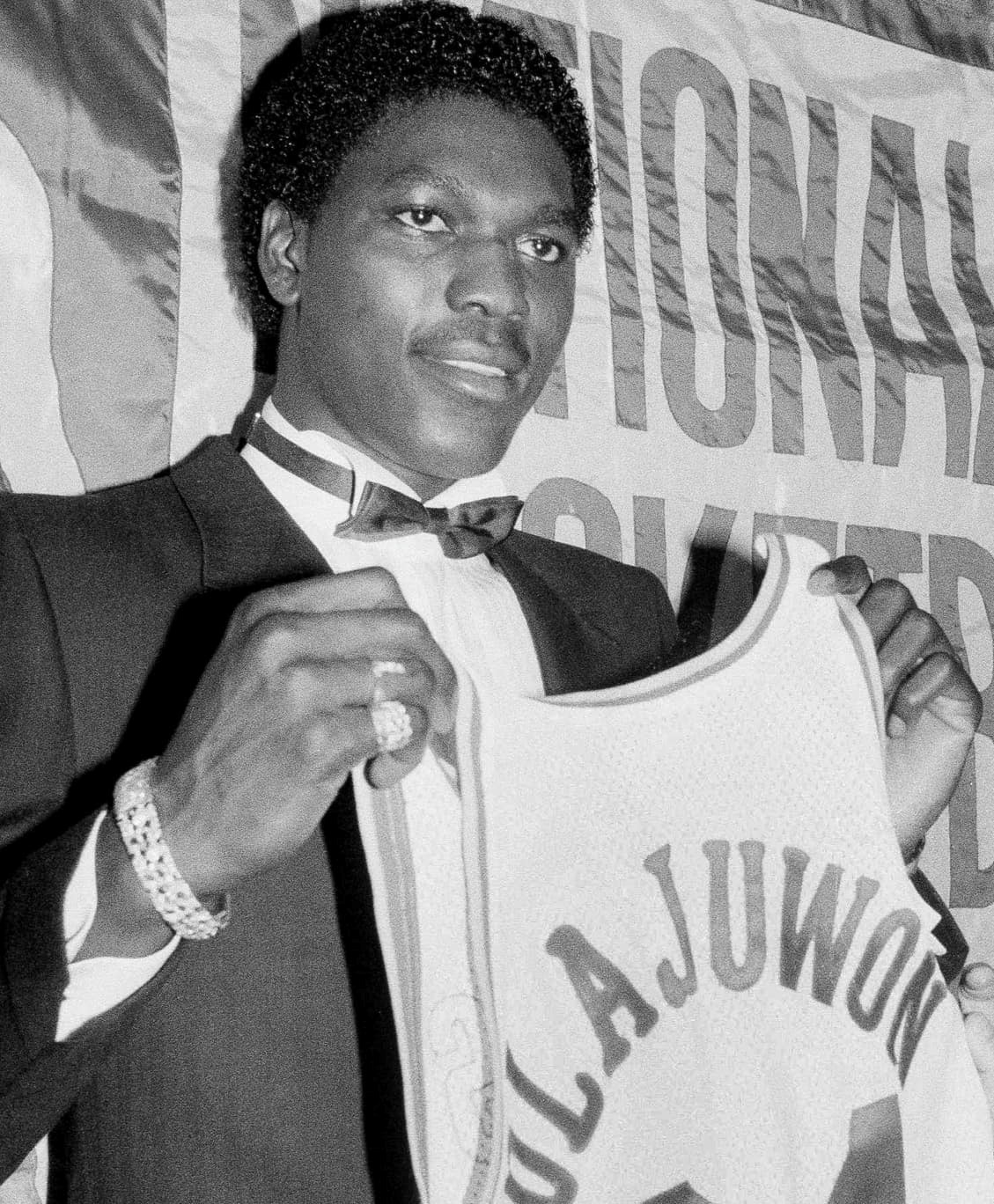
Future Hall of Fame inductee Hakeem Olajuwon (then known as Akeem) won in 1984.

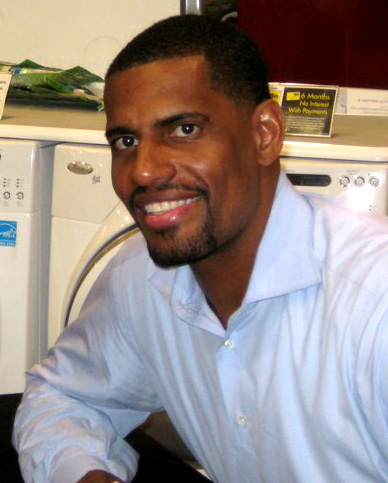
Kurt Thomas of TCU won in 1995 after leading the nation in scoring and rebounding.

Season	Player	Team	Position	Class	Reference
1957–58	Rick Herrscher	SMU	G / F	Senior	
1958–59	H. E. Kirchner	TCU	C	Senior	
1959–60	Jay Arnette	Texas	G	Senior	
1960–61	Carroll Broussard	Texas A&M	F	Junior	
1961–62	Carroll Broussard (2)	Texas A&M	F	Senior	
1962–63	Bennie Lenox	Texas A&M	G	Junior	
1963–64	Bennie Lenox (2)	Texas A&M	G	Senior	
1964–65	John Beasley	Texas A&M	C	Junior	
1965–66	John Beasley (2)	Texas A&M	C	Senior	
1966–67	Denny Holman	SMU	G	Senior	
1967–68	Billy Arnold	Texas	G	Senior	
1968–69^{†}	Ronnie Peret	Texas A&M	C	Senior	
1968–69^{†}	Greg Williams	Rice	G	Senior	
1969–70	Gene Phillips	SMU	F	Junior	
1970–71	Goo Kennedy	TCU	F	Junior	
1971–72	Larry Robinson	Texas	F	Sophomore	
1972–73	Martin Terry	Arkansas	G	Senior	
1973–74	Larry Robinson (2)	Texas	F	Senior	
1974–75	Rick Bullock	Texas Tech	F	Junior	
1975–76	Ira Terrell	SMU	C	Senior	
1976–77	Otis Birdsong	Houston	G	Senior	
1977–78	Ron Brewer	Arkansas	G	Senior	
1978–79	Sidney Moncrief	Arkansas	G	Senior	
1979–80	Terry Teagle	Baylor	G / F	Sophomore	
1980–81	Rob Williams	Houston	G	Sophomore	
1981–82	Ricky Pierce	Rice	F	Senior	
1982–83^{†}	Clyde Drexler	Houston	G / F	Junior	
1982–83^{†}	Darrell Walker	Arkansas	G	Senior	
1983–84	Akeem Olajuwon	Houston	C	Junior	
1984–85	Bubba Jennings	Texas Tech	G	Senior	
1985–86	John Brownlee	Texas	F / C	Senior	
1986–87	Carven Holcombe	TCU	G	Senior	
1987–88	Darryl Middleton	Baylor	C	Senior	
1988–89	Travis Mays	Texas	G	Junior	
1989–90	Travis Mays (2)	Texas	G	Senior	
1990–91	Oliver Miller	Arkansas	C	Junior	
1991–92	Will Flemons	Texas Tech	F	Junior	
1992–93	Mike Wilson	SMU	G	Senior	
1993–94	B. J. Tyler	Texas	G	Senior	
1994–95	Kurt Thomas	TCU	C	Senior	
1995–96	Jason Sasser	Texas Tech	F	Senior	

== Winners by school ==
School (year joined)	Winners	Years
Texas (1915)	8	1960, 1968, 1972, 1974, 1986, 1989, 1990, 1994
Texas A&M (1915)	7	1961, 1962, 1963, 1964, 1965, 1966, 1969^{†}
Arkansas (1915)	5	1973, 1978, 1979, 1983^{†}, 1991
SMU (1918)	5	1958, 1967, 1970, 1976, 1993
Houston (1971)	4	1977, 1981, 1983^{†}, 1984
TCU (1923)	4	1959, 1971, 1987, 1995
Texas Tech (1956)	4	1975, 1985, 1992, 1996
Baylor (1915)	2	1980, 1988
Rice (1918)	2	1969^{†}, 1982
