= Billy Arnold (basketball) =

American basketball player

Personal information
- Listed height: 6 ft 1 in (1.85 m)

Career information
- High school: Haltom (Haltom City, Texas)
- College: Texas (1965–1968)
- NBA draft: 1968: undrafted
- Position: Guard

Career history

Coaching
- 1968–19??: Elgin HS

Career highlights
- SWC Player of the Year (1968); First-team All-SWC (1968)

Billy Arnold (born 1940s) is an American former basketball player known for his college career at the University of Texas during the 1960s.

A native of Haltom City, Texas, Arnold was an all-state player for Haltom High School before enrolling at Texas in the fall of 1964. Due to NCAA player eligibility rules at the time, freshmen could not play varsity basketball, so Arnold did not begin his career for the Longhorns until his sophomore season in 1965–66. In his three seasons, Arnold appeared in 66 games and averaged 13.3 points and 2.3 rebounds per game. His best year came in 1967–68, his senior season, in which he averaged 19.9 points and 3.4 rebounds per game while leading Texas to a second-place finish in the Southwest Conference (SWC). Arnold led the conference in scoring and was named to the All-SWC First Team while also being honored as the SWC Player of the Year.

Arnold did not pursue a professional career. Shortly after graduating from Texas in 1968, he was tapped to be the newest head boys' basketball coach for Elgin High School in Elgin, Texas.
