= 1954–55 Texas Tech Red Raiders basketball team =

American college basketball season

1954–55 Texas Tech Red Raiders basketball

Border Conference regular season co-champion
- Conference: Border Intercollegiate Athletic Association
- Record: 18–7 (9–3 Border)
- Head coach: Polk Robison (8th season)

The 1954–55 Texas Tech Red Raiders men's basketball team represented Texas Tech University in the Border Intercollegiate Athletic Association during the 1954–55 NCAA men's basketball season. The head coach was Polk Robison, his 8th year with the team.
