= Ronald Ross (basketball) =

American basketball player and coach (born 1983)

Personal information
- Born: February 11, 1983 (age 43) Hobbs, New Mexico, U.S.
- Listed height: 6 ft 2 in (1.88 m)
- Listed weight: 185 lb (84 kg)

Career information
- High school: Hobbs (Hobbs, New Mexico)
- College: Texas Tech (2001–2005)
- NBA draft: 2005: undrafted
- Playing career: 2005–2018
- Position: Point guard
- Number: 10
- Coaching career: 2018–2020

Career history

Playing
- 2005–2006: Castelletto Ticino
- 2006–2007: Butte Daredevils
- 2007: Albany Patroons
- 2007–2008: MHP Riesen Ludwigsburg
- 2008: Artland Dragons
- 2009: Maccabi Givat Shmuel
- 2009: Maccabi Haifa
- 2009–2010: Artland Dragons
- 2010–2011: Syntainics
- 2011–2013: Jolly JBŠ
- 2013–2014: Apollon Patras
- 2014: Jolly JBŠ
- 2014: ESSM Le Portel
- 2014–2016: Pitești
- 2016–2017: Keravnos
- 2017: Trikala 2000
- 2017–2018: Keravnos

Coaching
- 2018–2020: Texas Tech (graduate assistant)

Career highlights
- A1 League All-Defensive Team (2014); A1 League All-Imports Team (2014); Second-team All-A1 League (2014); USBL Defensive Player of the Year (2007); First-team All-USBL (2007); Chip Hilton Player of the Year (2005); First-team All-Big 12 (2005); Big 12 All-Defensive Team (2005)

Ronald Ross (born February 11, 1983) is an American retired professional basketball player and coach. He played internationally for a number of years but he is best known for his collegiate career at Texas Tech University.

== Playing career ==
=== High school ===
A native of the Southwest, Ross starred at Hobbs High School in Hobbs, New Mexico. He was an integral part of three consecutive state championships from 1999 to 2001, including an undefeated campaign as a sophomore in 1998–99 (27–0). Hobbs High School won the 1999 and 2001 state championships at the University of New Mexico's famous home court, The Pit. And while Ross performed well throughout his prep career – having been named USA Today's New Mexico State Player of the Year as a senior – he found himself without any four-year college scholarship offers. In one game that season he recorded 38 points, 8 steals, 8 rebounds, 7 assists and 5 dunks.

=== College ===
Ross decided to walk on to the Texas Tech basketball team as a freshman in 2001–02, in spite of his mother's urging to attend one year of junior college instead. It was Bob Knight's first year at Tech and he needed talented walk-ons to begin building his roster. It took until Ross' junior year to earn a scholarship, however. Years later his mother said, "I had to support him. It was expensive and hard at first, but I'd have to say it's worked out." The year he earned his scholarship saw him more than double his scoring average from 4.5 as a sophomore to 10.1 as a junior. He started 31 of 34 games played, and rounded out his season averages with 3.1 assists and 1.5 steals.

Knight made Ross a team captain when he became a senior in 2004–05. Ross was known for his work ethic and later that season garnered praise from Knight, who said "He's an all-time example to kids as to what they can do with what they have." He again substantially increased his scoring average, netting 17.5 points per game to along with 5.5 rebounds, 3.0 assists, and 2.6 steals per game. The 6th-seeded Red Raiders advanced to the NCAA tournament's Sweet Sixteen behind Ross' great play. In the opening round win against 11th-seeded UCLA, Ross scored a then-school record for points in an NCAA Tournament game with 28 (later surpassed by Jarrett Culver in 2019). In the next round against 3rd-seeded Gonzaga, he scored 24 points, including a go-ahead three-pointer with 1:06 remaining as well as two free throws to clinch the Red Raiders' two-point win. Ross garnered several individual accolades. For Big 12 Conference honors he was named to the All-Big 12 first-team and the All-Defensive Team. Nationally, he was named the winner of the Chip Hilton Player of the Year Award, given by the NCAA to a Division I player who demonstrated outstanding character, leadership, integrity, humility, sportsmanship, and talent. Ross finished his collegiate career with 1,174 points.

==== Statistics ====
Texas Tech statistics
Year	G	GS	FG	FGA	PCT	FT	FTA	PCT	REB	AVG	A	AVG	TO	B	S	MIN	PTS	AVG
2001–02	30	5	38	78	.487	17	26	.654	32	1.1	29	1.0	24	1	12	317	93	3.1
2002–03	35	20	68	154	.442	16	26	.615	71	2.0	86	2.5	33	9	56	697	159	4.5
2003–04	34	31	132	268	.493	57	73	.781	117	3.4	106	3.1	57	7	50	981	344	10.1
2004–05	33	31	232	447	.519	74	97	.763	180	5.5	99	3.0	56	3	86	1,138	578	17.5
Totals	132	87	470	947	.496	164	222	.739	400	3.0	320	2.4	170	20	204	3,133	1,174	8.9

=== Professional ===
Following Texas Tech, Ross went undrafted in the 2005 NBA draft. He quickly found a spot playing for Castelletto Ticino in Serie A2 Basket, Italy's second-tier league. After one year he returned to the United States to play in the Continental Basketball Association (CBA) for the Butte Daredevils, and then in the USBL for the Albany Patroons. During his time with the Patroons he earned All-USBL first-team honors and was also named the league's defensive player of the year.

Overall, Ross' professional career spanned 13 years (2005–2018) and included stops in Italy, Germany, Israel, Croatia, Greece, France, Cyprus, and Romania.

== Coaching career ==
Texas Tech head coach Chris Beard offered Ronald Ross a position as a graduate assistant in 2018–19. Beard had been an assistant coach under Bob Knight during Ross' college playing career, and there was much mutual respect. Ross took the position, and in his first year the Red Raiders made it to the NCAA national championship game for the first time in school history, but lost 85–77 in overtime. He coached one more season, but upon the conclusion of 2019–20 he resigned, opting to leave the coaching profession to instead to pursue a career in business. He relayed his resignation to the public via Twitter, posting "Coaching has been a blessing and I’m confident in my capabilities to be great at it, but I’ve always been intrigued by business and I’m simply just motivated to conquer a new quest and pursue something different!"
