= 1985–86 Texas Tech Red Raiders basketball team =

American college basketball season

1985–86 Texas Tech Red Raiders basketball

SWC Classic tournament

NCAA Division I men's basketball tournament First round, L, 70–64 v. Georgetown
- Conference: Southwest Conference
- Record: 17–14 (9–7 SWC)
- Head coach: Gerald Myers (16th season)
- Home arena: Lubbock Municipal Coliseum

1985–86 Southwest Conference men's basketball standings
	Conf.				Overall
Team	W		L	PCT	W		L	PCT
TCU	12	–	4	.750	22	–	9	.710
Texas	12	–	4	.750	19	–	12	.613
Texas A&M	12	–	4	.750	20	–	12	.625
SMU	10	–	6	.625	18	–	11	.621
Texas Tech †	9	–	7	.563	18	–	13	.581
Houston	8	–	8	.500	14	–	14	.500
Arkansas	4	–	12	.250	12	–	16	.429
Baylor	3	–	13	.188	11	–	16	.407
Rice	2	–	14	.125	9	–	19	.321
† 1986 SWC tournament winner Rankings from AP Poll

The 1985–86 Texas Tech Red Raiders men's basketball team represented Texas Tech University in the Southwest Conference during the 1985–86 NCAA Division I men's basketball season. The head coach was Gerald Myers, his 16th year with the team. The Red Raiders played their home games in the Lubbock Municipal Coliseum in Lubbock, Texas.

Texas Tech lost to Georgetown in the first round of the NCAA tournament.
