= Rick Bullock =

American basketball player (born 1954)

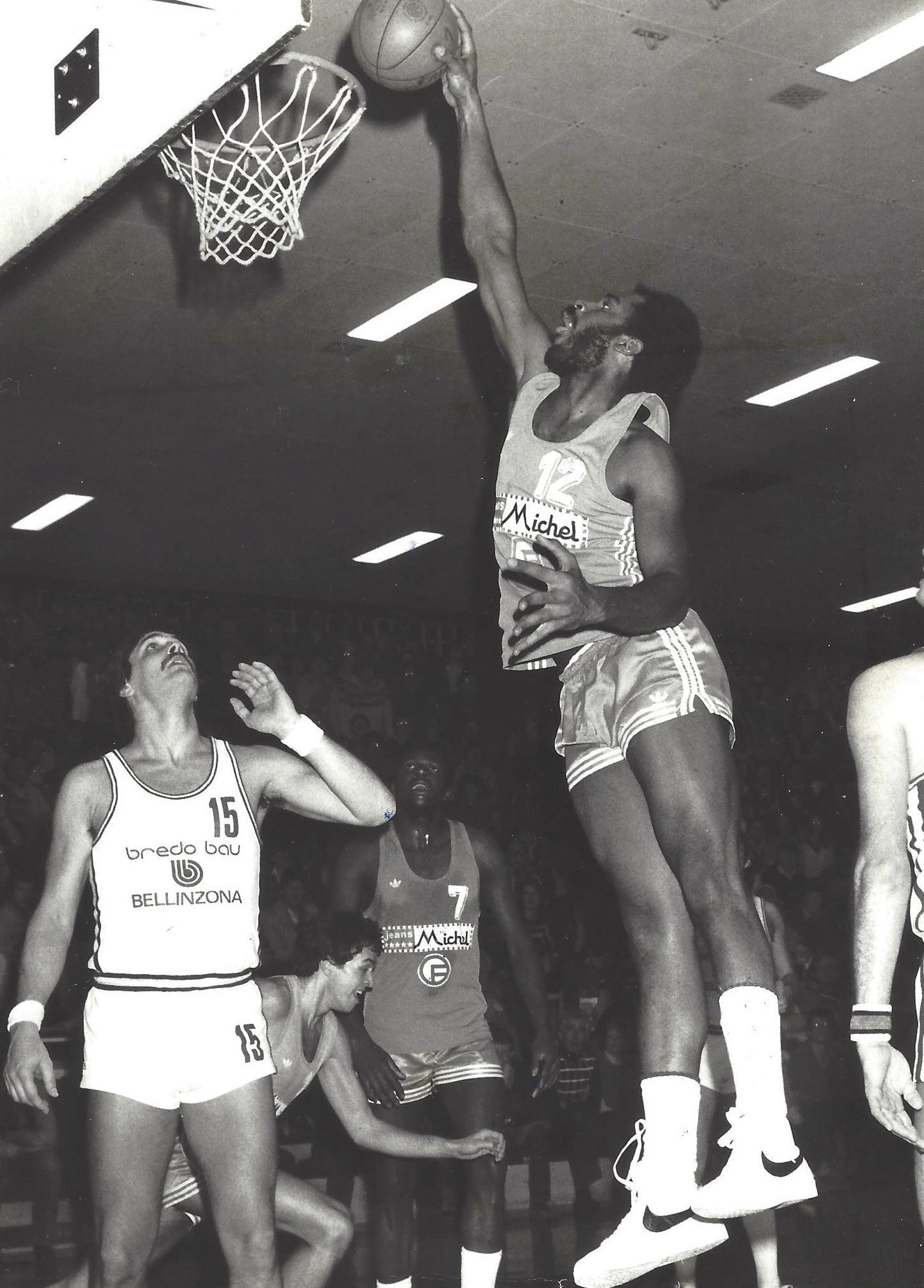
- Bullock playing professionally for Fribourg Olympic Basket in Switzerland

Personal information
- Born: August 9, 1954 (age 71) San Antonio, Texas, U.S.
- Listed height: 6 ft 9 in (2.06 m)
- Listed weight: 240 lb (109 kg)

Career information
- High school: Thomas Jefferson (San Antonio, Texas)
- College: Texas Tech (1972–1976)
- NBA draft: 1976: 4th round, 57th overall pick
- Drafted by: New York Knicks
- Position: Power forward

Career history
- 1978–1979: Lancaster Red Roses
- 1979: Pallacanestro Cantù
- 1980–1983: Fribourg Olympic Basket

Career highlights
- 2× Swiss Basketball League champion (1981, 1982); SWC Player of the Year (1975); 3× First-team All-SWC (1974–1976); Second-team All-SWC (1973); SWC Newcomer of the Year (1973); SWC Freshman of the Year (1973); SWC Tournament MVP (1976)
- Stats at Basketball Reference

Rick Bullock (born August 9, 1954) is an American former professional basketball player, who played collegiate basketball for the Texas Tech Red Raiders basketball team and was selected 57th by the New York Knicks in the 1976 NBA draft.

== High school career ==
A native of San Antonio, Texas, Bullock attended Thomas Jefferson High School. He scored 1,941 points in 104 games, with 893 of those points coming in 37 games during his senior year. During his three years at Jefferson, Bullock averaged 24.1 points a game and led the Mustangs to win 92 of the 104 games played over a three-year span with him in the line-up. Bullock also led the Mustangs to the 1972 Texas 5A State Championship before losing to Dallas' Roosevelt High School. In that game, Bullock scored 44 points against Dallas Roosevelt, a mark that still stands as a record in state championship games within the UIL University Interscholastic League (UIL). Bullock also held the San Antonio city scoring record for 25 years until South San Antonio West Campus High School's Devin Brown broke it in 1997.

== College career ==
=== Overview ===
Bullock was a highly recruited basketball player in high school and accepted a scholarship offer from Texas Tech University's head coach Gerald Myers to play for the Red Raiders. During his collegiate career, he helped lead Texas Tech to two Southwest Conference championships and two NCAA Tournament appearances.

As a freshman in 1972–73, Bullock helped guide the Red Raiders to a 19–8 record and the SWC title. He averaged 13.8 points and 7.5 rebounds per game as Texas Tech qualified for the 1973 NCAA tournament, but fell to South Carolina in the opening round, 78–70.

In 1973–74, Bullock increased his production to 21.4 points and 10.7 rebounds per game as a sophomore. As a junior in 1974–75, he averaged 20.9 points and 11.0 rebounds per game. During his senior season in 1975–76, Bullock led the Red Raiders 25–6 overall, 13–3 SWC to the 1976 NCAA tournament's Sweet 16 before losing to Missouri, 75–86.

=== Achievements ===
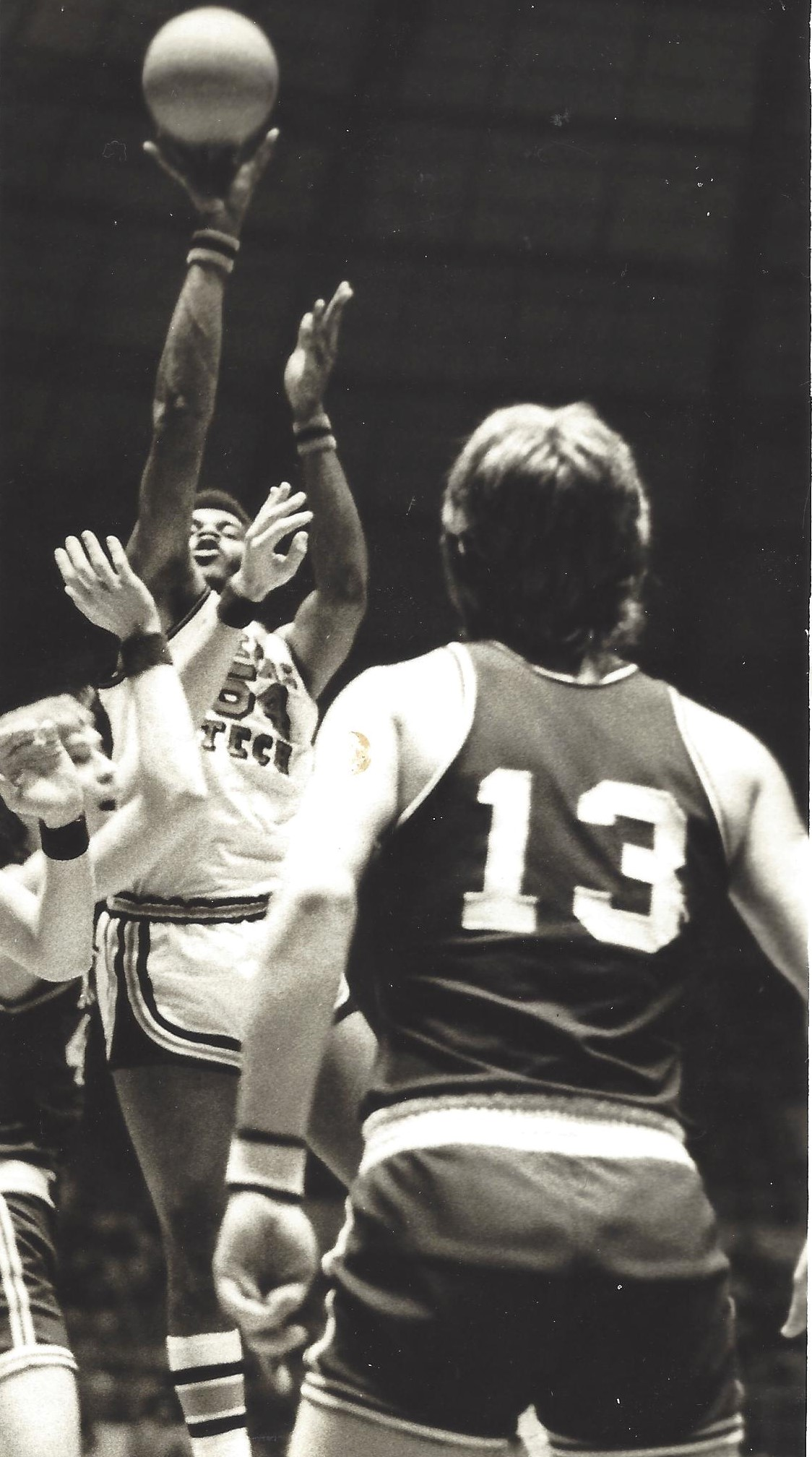
Bullock shoots a jump shot during a game in 1975.

Bullock remains among the most accomplished players in Texas Tech basketball history. Texas Tech school records. He is the only Red Raider to record both 2,000 career points and 1,000 career rebounds. At the conclusion of his career, his 2,118 points, 1,057 rebounds, and 842 field goals set school records, with the field-goal mark standing for 26 years. His 1,057 rebounds were previously a school record as well. He also recorded 50 career double-doubles and finished with a 57 percent career field-goal percentage. During his collegiate career, he compiled a streak of 10 consecutive games scoring at least 20 points.

Bullock received numerous individual honors during his time at Texas Tech. He was named Southwest Conference (SWC) Freshman of the Year and Newcomer of the Year in 1973, SWC Player of the Year (1975), and the SWC Tournament MVP (1976). He earned All-SWC Second Team honors in (1973) and three-time First Team selection (1974–1976). Nationally, Bullock was honored as a freshman All-America selection in 1973 and earned Associated Press All-America honorable mention as a sophomore, junior, and senior. Bullock was the twice the leading vote-getter for Universal Sports All-America and earned USBWA All-District in his junior and senior years.

Bullock ranked in the national top 20 in scoring and field goal percentage for three consecutive seasons. He finished ranked among the nation's scoring leaders in 1974 (37th) and 1976 (24th). He was also ranked among the nation's leaders in field-goal percentage in 1974 (14th) and 1975 (21st). Bullock averaged 20.3 points and 8.7 rebounds in three NCAA tournament games. Bullock also was selected as a starter for both the East/West All-Star Game and the Pizza Hut All-Star Classic following his senior season.

=== Legacy ===
Bullock was inducted as a member in the Texas Tech Hall of Fame and the Texas Association of Basketball Coaches in 1985, the Southwest Conference Hall Of Fame in 2013, the Texas Tech Ring of Honor in March 2019, the San Antonio Sports Hall of Fame in 2011, and was listed by the UIL as one of the top 100 Texas high school basketball players of all time in 2021.

== Professional career and later life ==
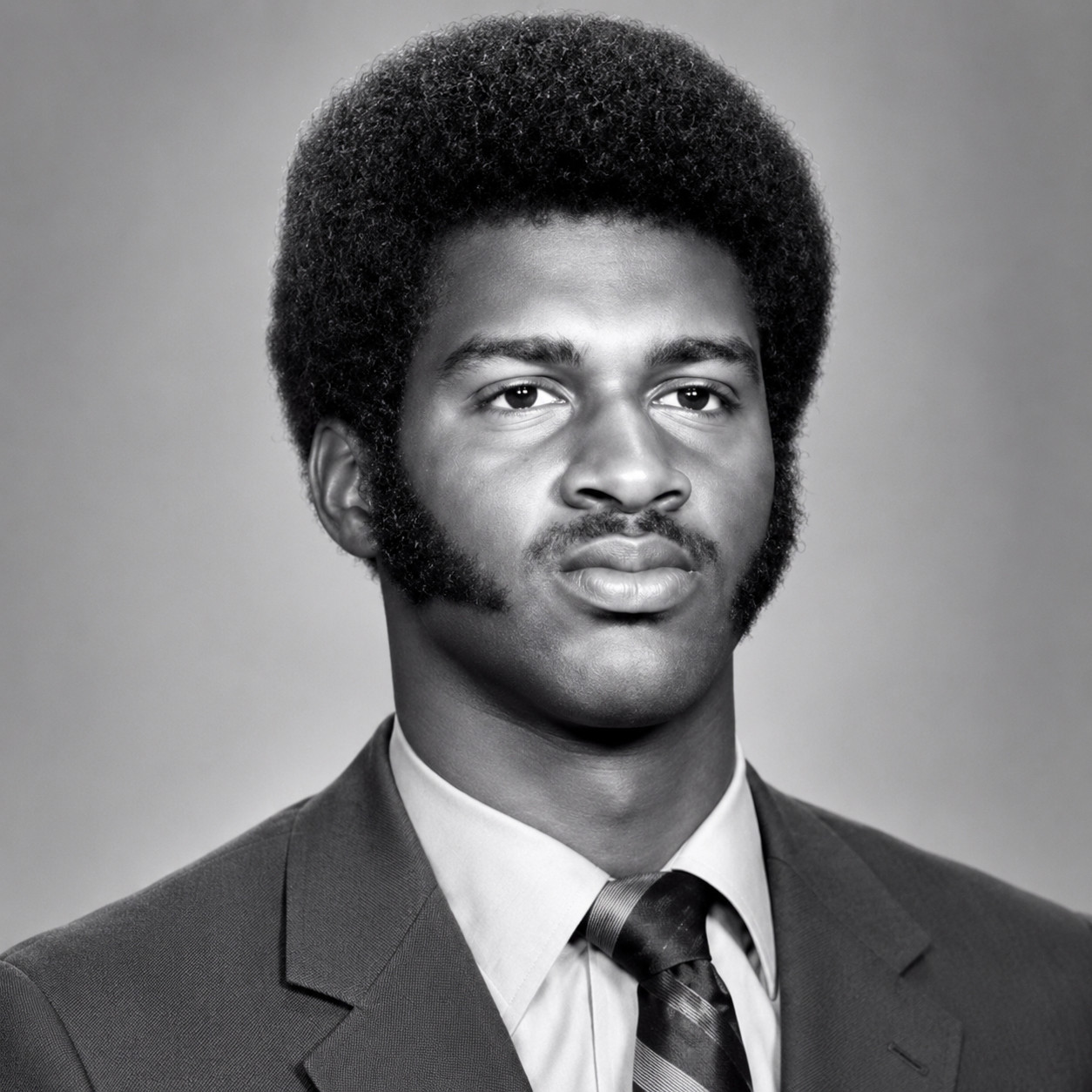
Rick Bullock NBA Draft Picture 1976

The New York Knicks selected Bullock with the 57th overall pick in the fourth round of the 1976 NBA draft. He participated with the Knicks during the preseason but was waived before the start of the regular season. In April 1977, Bullock signed with the San Antonio Spurs in April 1977. however, he was again waived prior to the start of the regular season.

He then transitioned from the NBA to play in the Continental Basketball Association (CBA) for the Lancaster Red Roses during the 1978–79 season. There he averaged 13.8 points, 10.8 rebounds and 1.2 assists per game in his 33-game career with the team, but found tremendous success furthering his professional career in Europe playing in the EuroLeague. Bullock played for Pallacanestro Cantù in Italy and Fribourg Olympic Basket in Switzerland, formerly known as Benetton Fribourg where he won two championships in 1981 and 1982. After the 1982–83 Euroleague season, Bullock left Fribourg Olympic and returned to the states in July 1983. Bullock reconnected with the New York Knicks again, this time under new head coach Hubie Brown, who has replaced Red Holzman, but both parties parted ways prior to the beginning of the 1983 season.

After his basketball career, Bullock returned home where he has worked for the city of San Antonio. He is married and has three children.

== See also ==
- List of NCAA Division I men's basketball players with 2,000 points and 1,000 rebounds
