= 1985–86 Houston Cougars men's basketball team =

American college basketball season

1985–86 Houston Cougars men's basketball
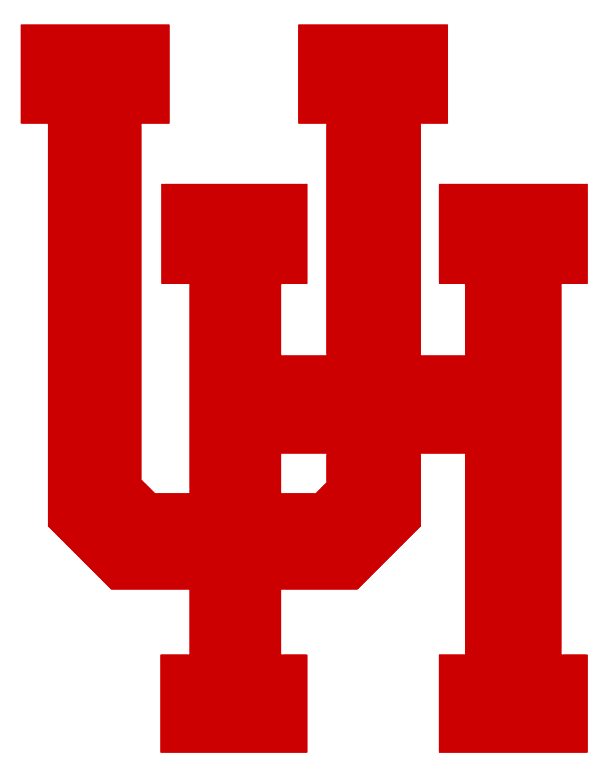
- Conference: Southwest Conference
- Record: 14–14 (8–8 SWC)
- Head coach: Guy Lewis (30th season)
- Assistant coaches: Terry Kirkpatrick; Don Schverak
- Home arena: Hofheinz Pavilion

1985–86 Southwest Conference men's basketball standings
	Conf.				Overall
Team	W		L	PCT	W		L	PCT
TCU	12	–	4	.750	22	–	9	.710
Texas	12	–	4	.750	19	–	12	.613
Texas A&M	12	–	4	.750	20	–	12	.625
SMU	10	–	6	.625	18	–	11	.621
Texas Tech †	9	–	7	.563	18	–	13	.581
Houston	8	–	8	.500	14	–	14	.500
Arkansas	4	–	12	.250	12	–	16	.429
Baylor	3	–	13	.188	11	–	16	.407
Rice	2	–	14	.125	9	–	19	.321
† 1986 SWC tournament winner Rankings from AP Poll

The 1985–86 Houston Cougars men's basketball team represented the University of Houston in NCAA Division I competition in the 1985–86 season.

Houston, coached by Guy Lewis, played its home games in the Hofheinz Pavilion in Houston, Texas, and was then a member of the Southwest Conference.

After the season, Lewis retired, and was replaced by Pat Foster.

== Roster ==
1985–86 Houston Cougars men's basketball team
Players
Coaches

Pos.	#	Name	Height	Weight	Year	Previous school	Hometown
F/C	54	Greg Anderson	6 ft 9 in (2.06 m)	220 lb (100 kg)	Jr	Worthing HS	Houston, TX
F	50	Stacey Belcher	6 ft 6 in (1.98 m)	210 lb (95 kg)	Jr	Yates HS	Houston, TX
G	20	Alvin Franklin	6 ft 2 in (1.88 m)	185 lb (84 kg)	Sr	La Marque HS	La Marque, TX
G	12	Renaldo Thomas	6 ft 4 in (1.93 m)	200 lb (91 kg)	Sr	Roosevelt HS	Gary, IN
F	40	Rickie Winslow	6 ft 8 in (2.03 m)	215 lb (98 kg)	Jr	Yates HS	Houston, TX

Head coach

- Guy Lewis (Houston)

Assistant coach(es)

- Terry Kirkpatrick
- Don Schverak

Legend

- (C) Team captain
- (S) Suspended
- (I) Ineligible
- (W) Walk-on
- Injured
- Current redshirt

Roster

== Schedule and results ==
Date time, TV	Rank^{#}	Opponent^{#}	Result	Record	Site city, state
Regular season
Nov 23, 1985*		vs. Virginia	L 77–92	0–1	Capital Centre; Landover, Maryland
Nov 29, 1985*		Texas Wesleyan	W 100–73	1–1	Hofheinz Pavilion; Houston, Texas
Dec 5, 1985*		at UTSA	W 104–59	2–1	Convocation Center; San Antonio, Texas
Dec 7, 1985*		St. Mary's	W 76–65	3–1	Hofheinz Pavilion; Houston, Texas
Dec 12, 1985*		No. 19 DePaul	L 78–84	3–2	Hofheinz Pavilion; Houston, Texas
Dec 14, 1985*		at No. 10 Illinois	L 92–102	3–3	Assembly Hall; Champaign, Illinois
Dec 18, 1985*		BYU–Hawaii	W 92–82	4–3	Hofheinz Pavilion; Houston, Texas
Dec 21, 1985*		Long Beach State	W 96–86	5–3	Hofheinz Pavilion; Houston, Texas
Dec 27, 1985*		at Toledo; Blade Classic	L 74–80	5–4	Centennial Hall; Toledo, Ohio
Dec 28, 1985*		vs. Detroit; Blade Classic	W 75–64	6–4	Centennial Hall; Toledo, Ohio
Jan 2, 1986		Texas	L 68–70	6–5 (0–1)	Hofheinz Pavilion; Houston, Texas
Jan 4, 1986		at Texas Tech	L 68–69 ^{OT}	6–6 (0–2)	Lubbock Municipal Coliseum; Lubbock, Texas
Jan 11, 1986		Rice	L 68–71	6–7 (0–3)	Hofheinz Pavilion; Houston, Texas
Jan 15, 1986		at Arkansas	W 87–85 ^{OT}	7–7 (1–3)	Barnhill Arena; Fayetteville, Arkansas
Jan 18, 1986		at Baylor	W 79–58	8–7 (2–3)	Heart O' Texas Coliseum; Waco, Texas
Jan 22, 1986		Texas A&M	W 76–69	9–7 (3–3)	Hofheinz Pavilion; Houston, Texas
Jan 25, 1986		SMU	W 71–66	10–7 (4–3)	Hofheinz Pavilion; Houston, Texas
Jan 29, 1986		at TCU	L 49–53	10–8 (4–4)	Daniel-Meyer Coliseum; Fort Worth, Texas
Feb 1, 1986		at Texas	L 53–79	10–9 (4–5)	Frank Erwin Center; Austin, Texas
Feb 5, 1986		Texas Tech	L 91–92 ^{2OT}	10–10 (4–6)	Hofheinz Pavilion; Houston, Texas
Feb 12, 1986		at Rice	W 71–69	11–10 (5–6)	Rice Gymnasium; Houston, Texas
Feb 15, 1986		Arkansas	W 93–83	12–10 (6–6)	Hofheinz Pavilion; Houston, Texas
Feb 20, 1986		Baylor	W 77–70	13–10 (7–6)	Hofheinz Pavilion; Houston, Texas
Feb 22, 1986*		No. 16 Louisville	L 59–76	13–11	Hofheinz Pavilion; Houston, Texas
Feb 24, 1986		at Texas A&M	L 75–82	13–12 (7–7)	G. Rollie White Coliseum; College Station, Texas
Feb 26, 1986		at SMU	L 71–78	13–13 (7–8)	Moody Coliseum; University Park, Texas
Mar 1, 1986		TCU	W 85–83 ^{OT}	14–13 (8–8)	Hofheinz Pavilion; Houston, Texas
SWC tournament
Mar 7, 1986*	(6)	vs. (3) Texas; First round	L 62–78	14–14	Reunion Arena; Dallas, Texas
*Non-conference game. ^{#}Rankings from AP Poll. (#) Tournament seedings in parentheses. All times are in Central Time.
