= 1985–86 Arkansas Razorbacks men's basketball team =

American college basketball season

1985–86 Arkansas Razorbacks men's basketball
- Conference: Southwest Conference
- Record: 12-16 (4-12 SwC)
- Head coach: Nolan Richardson (2nd season)
- Home arena: Barnhill Arena

1985–86 Southwest Conference men's basketball standings
	Conf.				Overall
Team	W		L	PCT	W		L	PCT
TCU	12	–	4	.750	22	–	9	.710
Texas	12	–	4	.750	19	–	12	.613
Texas A&M	12	–	4	.750	20	–	12	.625
SMU	10	–	6	.625	18	–	11	.621
Texas Tech †	9	–	7	.563	18	–	13	.581
Houston	8	–	8	.500	14	–	14	.500
Arkansas	4	–	12	.250	12	–	16	.429
Baylor	3	–	13	.188	11	–	16	.407
Rice	2	–	14	.125	9	–	19	.321
† 1986 SWC tournament winner Rankings from AP Poll

The 1985–86 Arkansas Razorbacks men's basketball team represented the University of Arkansas in the 1985-86 season. Led by head coach Nolan Richardson, the Razorbacks would achieve a 12-16 record, 4-12 7th place finish in the SWC. Their season ended on March 7, 1986 in an SWC tournament 1st round loss to Texas A&M 67-51.
