= 1953–54 Texas Tech Red Raiders basketball team =

American college basketball season

1953–54 Texas Tech Red Raiders basketball

Border Conference regular season champion

NCAA Division I men's basketball tournament First round, L, 73–64 v. Santa Clara
- Conference: Border Intercollegiate Athletic Association
- Record: 21–5 (11–1 Border)
- Head coach: Polk Robison (7th season)

The 1953–54 Texas Tech Red Raiders men's basketball team represented Texas Tech University in the Border Intercollegiate Athletic Association during the 1953–54 NCAA men's basketball season. The head coach was Polk Robison, his 7th year with the team.
