= 1986 Southwest Conference men's basketball tournament =

- Classification: Division I
- Season: 1985–86
- Teams: 8
- Site: Reunion Arena; Dallas, Texas
- Champions: Texas Tech (3rd title)
- Winning coach: Gerald Myers (3rd title)
- MVP: Tony Benford (Texas Tech)

1985–86 Southwest Conference men's basketball standings
	Conf.				Overall
Team	W		L	PCT	W		L	PCT
TCU	12	–	4	.750	22	–	9	.710
Texas	12	–	4	.750	19	–	12	.613
Texas A&M	12	–	4	.750	20	–	12	.625
SMU	10	–	6	.625	18	–	11	.621
Texas Tech †	9	–	7	.563	18	–	13	.581
Houston	8	–	8	.500	14	–	14	.500
Arkansas	4	–	12	.250	12	–	16	.429
Baylor	3	–	13	.188	11	–	16	.407
Rice	2	–	14	.125	9	–	19	.321
† 1986 SWC tournament winner Rankings from AP Poll

The 1986 Southwest Conference men's basketball tournament was held March 7–9, 1986, at Reunion Arena in Dallas, Texas.

Number 5 seed Texas Tech defeated 2 seed Texas A&M 67-63 to win their 3rd championship and receive the conference's automatic bid to the 1986 NCAA tournament.

== Format and seeding ==
The tournament consisted of the top 8 teams playing in a single-elimination tournament.

Place	Seed	Team	Conference			Overall		
Place	Seed	Team	W	L	%	W	L	%
1	1	TCU	12	4	.750	22	9	.710
1	2	Texas A&M	12	4	.750	20	12	.625
1	3	Texas	12	4	.750	19	12	.613
4	4	SMU	10	6	.625	18	11	.621
5	5	Texas Tech	9	7	.563	17	14	.548
6	6	Houston	8	8	.500	14	14	.500
7	7	Arkansas	4	12	.250	12	16	.429
9	8	Rice	2	14	.125	9	19	.321
8	-	Baylor	3	13	.188	11	16	.407

== Tournament ==
Quarterfinals; Friday, March 7
1	TCU	78
8	Rice	59
4	SMU	40
5	Texas Tech	45
3	Texas	78
6	Houston	62
2	Texas A&M	67
7	Arkansas	51

Semifinals; Saturday, March 8
1	TCU	67
5	Texas Tech	71
3	Texas	47
2	Texas A&M	55

Finals; Sunday, March 9
5	Texas Tech	67
2	Texas A&M	63
