= Bubba Jennings =

American basketball player and coach

Personal information
- Born: 1960s New Mexico, U.S.
- Listed height: 5 ft 10 in (1.78 m)
- Listed weight: 160 lb (73 kg)

Career information
- High school: Clovis (Clovis, New Mexico)
- College: Texas Tech (1980–1985)
- NBA draft: 1985: 4th round, 86th overall pick
- Drafted by: Dallas Mavericks
- Position: Point guard
- Number: 4

Career history

Coaching
- 1985–1986: Texas Tech (graduate assistant)
- 1986–1998: Artesia HS
- 1998?–2002: Coronado HS
- 2002–2008: Texas Tech (video operations manager)
- 2008–2013: Texas Tech (assistant)
- 2018–2021: Peaster HS
- 2021–present: Arlington Baptist

Career highlights
- As player: AP Honorable mention All-American (1985); Frances Pomeroy Naismith Award (1985); SWC Player of the Year (1985); First-team All-SWC (1985); As coach: ACCA tournament national champion
- Stats at Basketball Reference

Brooks "Bubba" Jennings (born 1960s) is an American college basketball coach at Arlington Baptist University. He is best known for his collegiate playing career when he suited up for Texas Tech University between 1980 and 1985. During his time as a Red Raider, Jennings recorded 1,727 points, 378 assists and 149 steals. As a senior in 1984–85 he was honored with the Frances Pomeroy Naismith Award, a national award given to the best college men's basketball player who is 6'0" or shorter. At the end of the 2012–13 season, after having served as an assistant coach at his alma mater, Jennings was fired as part of a wholesale change in direction of the men's basketball department at Texas Tech.

== Playing career ==
=== High school ===
Jennings attended Clovis High School in Clovis, New Mexico. He had a highly successful prep career, and in his final season in 1979–80 he set a state record for points in a game (75, December 1979, at Reese Air Force Base) and season. The NHSCAA named him to their All-America and Academic All-America teams; by another voting outlet, he was the New Mexico Player of the Year in 1980. Jennings also led Clovis to a New Mexico AAAA state championship in his junior season of 1978–79 and was named to the Class 4A all-state team. Upon high school graduation, he was inducted into the Panhandle Sports Hall of Fame.

=== College ===
Between 1980–81 and 1984–85, Jennings played four seasons at Texas Tech University (he redshirted his true sophomore season in 1981–82 when he broke his foot in the third game of the season). In each of his four years he was named an All-Southwest Conference (SWC) selection. During the 1982–83 season, the Red Raiders team consisted of only eight players. Jennings was the catalyst for an historic season during his senior year in 1984–85. His 19.5 points paced the Red Raiders to a 23–8 overall record (12–4 SWC) conference championship and a berth in the NCAA Tournament, Texas Tech's first appearance in nine years. He was named the SWC Player of the Year as well as the SWC Defensive Player of the Year, honored with the Frances Pomeroy Naismith Award, was an honorable mention All-American, and was the SWC Athlete of the Year (regardless of sport). He led the team in scoring in three of his seasons while he also paced them for two seasons in both steals and assists. Jennings started all 117 games he played as a Red Raider.

==== College statistics ====
Year	Team	GP	GS	MPG	FG%	3P%	FT%	RPG	APG	SPG	BPG	PPG
1980–81	Texas Tech	28	28	34.0	.461	—	.796	1.4	2.9	0.6	0.1	10.9
1981–82	Texas Tech	3	3	25.0	.542	—	1.000	0.3	4.7	2.3	0.0	11.0
1982–83	Texas Tech	26	26		.454	—	.854	2.0	4.3	1.7		16.0
1983–84	Texas Tech	29	29	31.4	.505	—	.848	1.7	3.1	1.6	0.2	13.8
1984–85	Texas Tech	31	31	34.6	.548	—	.868	2.3	3.1	1.4	0.2	19.5
Career		117	117		.498	—	.851	1.8	3.4	1.3		15.0

=== Professional ===
Following college, the Dallas Mavericks chose him in the fourth round (86th overall) in the 1985 NBA draft, although he never played in the league. He instead went to Europe to play for the London Docklands Crystal Palace, although his career was short-lived.

== Coaching career ==
Jennings began his basketball coaching career as a graduate assistant at Texas Tech. He then got a head coaching job at Artesia High School in Artesia, New Mexico, where in nine seasons the team won two state championships. He also served as the head golf coach at Artesia and led them to one state title in that time. Jennings' next stop was Coronado High School in Lubbock, Texas. He led the school to back-to-back district and bi-district championships and was named the city coach of the year and District 3–5A. Eventually he returned to Texas Tech, also located in Lubbock, and spent several years as the men's basketball team's video operations manager. He moved his way up the college coaching ranks and in 2008 was named a full-time assistant coach. In March 2013, the entire staff except for interim head coach Chris Walker were fired by Texas Tech officials.

In July 2018, after five years working as a loan officer at First Bank and Trust in Lubbock, Texas, Jennings returned to coaching. He became the head boys' basketball coach at Peaster High School, a school where he coached for three seasons and won 85 games before accepting the head coach position at Arlington Baptist University in 2021. In his very first season, Jennings led the Arlington Baptist Patriots to the Association of Christian College Athletics (ACCA) national championship.

Record table
Season	Team	Overall	Conference	Standing	Postseason
Arlington Baptist Patriots (NCCAA Southwest Division II / ACCA) (2021–present)
2021–22	Arlington Baptist	16–11			ACCA National Champions
2022–23	Arlington Baptist	6–16			
2023–24	Arlington Baptist	13–12			
2024–25	Arlington Baptist	10–13			
Arlington Baptist:		45–52 (.464)			
Total:		45–52 (.464)			
National champion Postseason invitational champion Conference regular season champion Conference regular season and conference tournament champion Division regular season champion Division regular season and conference tournament champion Conference tournament champion
