= Jarrius Jackson =

American basketball player (born 1985)

Personal information
- Born: June 18, 1985 (age 41) Monroe, Louisiana, U.S.
- Listed height: 6 ft 1 in (1.85 m)
- Listed weight: 176 lb (80 kg)

Career information
- High school: Ouachita Parish (Monroe, Louisiana)
- College: Texas Tech (2003–2007)
- NBA draft: 2007: undrafted
- Playing career: 2007–2016
- Position: Shooting guard

Career history
- 2007–2008: Palma Aqua Mágica
- 2008–2009: BC Khimik
- 2009: MBC Mykolaiv
- 2009–2010: Fastweb Junior Casale
- 2010–2012: Prima Veroli
- 2012–2014: Vanoli Cremona
- 2014–2015: Givova Napoli Basket
- 2015–2016: Umana Reyer Venezia

Career highlights
- Italian Legadue Cup MVP (2011); Italian Legadue Cup (2011); 2× First-team All-Big 12 (2006, 2007)

Jarrius Jackson (born June 18, 1985) is an American-born naturalised-Italian professional basketball player who last played for Umana Reyer Venezia of the Lega Basket Serie A.

== High school career ==
The Monroe, Louisiana native played for local Ouachita Parish High School until 2003, earning All-District honours for 4 years, including two MVP awards. He was named to the Louisiana 5A All-State First Team as a junior and a senior, averaging 27.2 points, 5 rebounds, and 5 assists per game during the latter year.

During that period he also played AAU basketball with the Shreveport Select at the National Under-16 tournament.

== College career ==
Jackson joined Texas Tech, playing in the Big 12 Conference of the NCAA Division I, in 2003. As a freshman, he started in 32 of the 34 games he played, averaging 11.3 points (team second-best), 2.6 assists and 1.8 steals (team-best) in more than 32 minutes per game. He was selected into the Big 12 All-Freshman Team for 2003–04.

During his sophomore season, he started all 33 games, posting 15.3 points, a team-leading 3.4 assists and 3.3 rebounds in 34 minutes per game as he received All-Big 12 Third Team honours.

He led the entire Big 12 Conference in scoring with 20.5 points per game during the 2005–06 season, ranking 21st nationally. The junior added team-leading 2.9 assists and 1.6 steals in more than 38 minutes (more than anyone else in the conference). He was selected in the USBWA All-District 7 Team and All-Big 12 First Team.

He was briefly suspended in November 2006 for academic reasons, but returned to the side before play started. In his senior year, he again started all games, leading the Raiders in scoring with 19.9 points per game, in addition, he had 3.3 rebounds and 1.3 steals. Jackson also added a heap of awards: NABC All-District 9 First Team, Senior CLASS Award Second Team, USBWA All-District 7 Team, and a second successive selection to the All-Big 12 First Team.

At the end of his collegiate career in 2007, Jackson was ranked second in the Red Raiders’ all-time scoring list with 2,221 points, his 133 games were a new record. He took part in the NABC All-Star Game and Three-Point Contest in March of that year.

== Professional career ==
Going undrafted in the 2007 NBA draft, Jackson played for the Atlanta Hawks in the NBA Summer League. The American then moved to Europe, signing a one-year deal with Palma Aqua Mágica of the Spanish second division LEB Oro in July 2007. He parted ways with the Spaniards in February 2008, moving to Ukrainian Basketball SuperLeague outfit Khimik a month later.

Jackson stayed with Khimik until January 2009, where he was part of a group of players released by the side after a heavy defeat. He then finished the season with rival Ukrainian side Mykolaiv.

In July 2009, he moved to Italian team Fastweb Junior Casale of the second division Legadue.

The next season, he moved to another Legadue club, Prima Veroli. He would stay two years with Veroli, averaging 19.4 points per game in his first season and 14.1 in his second. Jackson scored 22 points as Veroli won the 2011 Italian Legadue Cup, being designated game MVP on the same occasion.

In July 2012, Jackson moved to Vanoli Cremona, another Italian club but this time in the first division Serie A. After a first season in the top flight where he contributed 13.6 points per game (48.9% and 35.1% shooting percentage from two and three respectively), he extended his contract through 2013–14. He increased his personal statistics the next season, posting 16.9 points per game.

In August 2014, he returned to the second division, signing with Givova Napoli Basket. Though he became Napoli's best scorer, the team struggled, especially off the pitch where it was plagued by financial problems, fueling exit rumours about Jackson amidst interest from Serie A sides. That proved to be the case as he rescinded his contract on 21 January 2015, at the time he was the fourth best scorer in the league with 19.2 points in more than 37 minutes per game, adding 6.1 rebounds and 3.3 assists.

On the same day he left Napoli, he signed with Serie A side Umana Reyer Venezia. The guard contributed 7,7 points in more than 20 minutes per game during the 15 regular season games he played, adding 7,1 points in 17 minutes in 12 playoff games as Reyer reached the playoff semifinals. In July 2015, his contract with the Venice side was renewed for 2015–16.

== Personal ==
On 14 January 2013, Jackson became an Italian citizen, he received the passport thanks to the Italian origins of his wife Adriana. He declared at the time that his Italian was getting better but not as good as that of his wife and two children. Though he has an Italian passport, he is not considered an Italian player in the league as he does not answer the requirements, he plays with the status of an EU player.
