= Andre Emmett =

American basketball player (1982–2019)

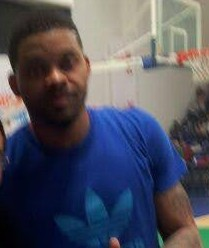

Personal information
- Born: August 27, 1982 Dallas, Texas, U.S.
- Died: September 23, 2019 (aged 37) Dallas, Texas, U.S.
- Listed height: 6 ft 5 in (1.96 m)
- Listed weight: 230 lb (104 kg)

Career information
- High school: Carter (Dallas, Texas)
- College: Texas Tech (2000–2004)
- NBA draft: 2004: 2nd round, 35th overall pick
- Drafted by: Seattle SuperSonics
- Playing career: 2004–2019
- Position: Shooting guard / small forward
- Number: 14

Career history
- 2004–2005: Memphis Grizzlies
- 2005–2006: Austin Toros
- 2006: Lietuvos rytas
- 2007: Los Angeles D-Fenders
- 2007–2008: Belgacom Liège
- 2008–2009: Élan Béarnais Pau-Orthez
- 2009: Marinos de Anzoátegui
- 2009–2010: Shandong Lions
- 2010: Mets de Guaynabo
- 2010–2011: Fujian Sturgeons
- 2011–2012: Reno Bighorns
- 2012: New Jersey Nets
- 2012: Sporting Al Riyadi Beirut
- 2012–2013: Amchit Club
- 2013–2014: Cocodrilos de Caracas
- 2014: Halcones Rojos Veracruz
- 2014: Cocodrilos de Caracas
- 2014: Piratas de Quebradillas
- 2014–2015: Fort Wayne Mad Ants
- 2015: Meralco Bolts
- 2015–2016: Jeonju KCC Egis
- 2016: Guaros de Lara
- 2016–2018: Jeonju KCC Egis
- 2019: Capitanes de Arecibo

Career highlights
- 2× NBA D-League All-Star (2012, 2015); NBA D-League All-Star Game MVP (2015); CBA Scoring champion (2010); Consensus first-team All-American (2004); 3× First-team All-Big 12 (2002–2004)
- Stats at NBA.com
- Stats at Basketball Reference

Andre Emmett (August 27, 1982 – September 23, 2019) was an American professional basketball player. He played college basketball for the Texas Tech Red Raiders, and was named a consensus All-American as a senior in 2004. He had brief stints in the National Basketball Association (NBA) with the Memphis Grizzlies and the New Jersey Nets after being selected in the second round of the 2004 NBA draft. Emmett was shot to death on September 23, 2019, in Dallas.

== College career ==
Emmett played college basketball for 4 years for Bob Knight at Texas Tech University. He is currently the Red Raiders' all-time leading scorer and the 3rd all-time leading scorer in the Big 12 behind Buddy Hield and LaceDarius Dunn with 2,256 points. During his freshman year and playing for Coach James Dickey, Emmett earned his way into the starting lineup averaging 7.7 points and 3.6 rebounds per game. When Bob Knight arrived at Texas Tech in 2001, Emmett saw his scoring average improve to 18.7 which was good enough for 3rd in the conference behind Drew Gooden and Kareem Rush and 1st team All-Big 12 honors. His junior and senior year, Emmett proved to be one of the best scorers in college basketball averaging 21.8 and 20.6 points per game, respectively. He also earned Unanimous 1st team All-Big 12 honors his junior and senior year and consensus All-American honors his senior year. Emmett capped off his college career by winning the 2004 NCAA Slam Dunk Contest.

== Professional career ==
=== 2004–05 season ===
Emmett was selected by the Seattle SuperSonics with the 35th overall pick in the 2004 NBA draft. He was later traded to the Memphis Grizzlies in a draft night trade. He joined the Grizzlies for 2004 NBA Summer League. On July 7, 2004, he signed his first professional contract with the Grizzlies. In the 2004–05 season, he played a total of 8 games for the Grizzlies.

=== 2005–06 season ===
Emmett re-joined the Grizzlies for the 2005 NBA Summer League. On August 3, 2005, Emmett was traded to the Miami Heat in a five-team trade involving the Memphis Grizzlies, Miami Heat, Boston Celtics, Utah Jazz, and New Orleans Hornets. On October 31, 2005, he was waived by the Heat. In November 2005, he was acquired by the Austin Toros of the NBA D-League.

=== 2006–07 season ===
In July 2006, Emmett joined the Dallas Mavericks for the Las Vegas Summer League and the Seattle SuperSonics for the Rocky Mountain Revue. Later that year, he signed with a Lithuanian club BC Lietuvos rytas for the 2006–07 season. In December 2006, he left Lietuvos rytas. On January 19, 2007, he was acquired by the Los Angeles D-Fenders.

=== 2007–08 season ===
Emmett joined the Houston Rockets for the 2007 NBA Summer League. In December 2007, he signed with the Liège Basket of Belgium for the rest of the 2007–08 season, subsequently finishing the best scorer (23.9 ppg) of the Belgian championship.

=== 2008–09 season ===
Emmett joined the Indiana Pacers for the 2008 NBA Summer League. On September 29, 2008, he signed with the Philadelphia 76ers. However, he was waived by the 76ers on October 6. Later that month, he joined Élan Béarnais Pau-Orthez of France for the 2008–09 season. In January 2009, he left Pau-Orthez after playing in only 5 games. He later joined Marinos de Anzoátegui for the 2009 LPB season.

=== 2009–10 season ===
In November 2009, he signed with the Shandong Lions of China for the 2009–10 season. In March 2010, he scored a (then) CBA-record 71 points in a game against the Jiangsu Dragons. Following the CBA season, he joined Mets de Guaynabo for the rest of the 2010 BSN season.

=== 2010–11 season ===
In December 2010, he signed with Fujian Xunxing of China for the rest of the 2010–11 season. On March 25, 2011, he was acquired by the Reno Bighorns.

=== 2011–12 season ===
On December 15, 2011, he was re-acquired by the Bighorns. On February 14, 2012, he signed a 10-day contract with the New Jersey Nets. On February 24, 2012, he returned to the Bighorns. In April 2012, he signed with Sporting Al Riyadi Beirut of Lebanon for the 2012 FLB League playoffs.

=== 2012–13 season ===
Emmett joined the NBA D-League Select Team for the 2012 NBA Summer League. On October 1, 2012, he signed with the Chicago Bulls. However, he was waived by the Bulls on October 15.

In December 2012, Emmett signed with Amchit Club of Lebanon for the rest of the 2012–13 season. Following the FLB League season, he joined Cocodrilos de Caracas for the 2013 LPB season, but left after 5 games.

=== 2013–14 season ===
In January 2014, Emmett joined Cocodrilos de Caracas for the 2014 FIBA Americas League. In April 2014, he joined Halcones Rojos Veracruz of Mexico before re-joining Cocodrilos de Caracas for the 2014 LPB season. On July 13, 2014, he signed with Piratas de Quebradillas of the BSN where he played one game.

=== 2014–15 season ===
On November 1, 2014, Emmett was selected by the Fort Wayne Mad Ants in the second round of the 2014 NBA D-League draft. On February 4, 2015, he was named to the Futures All-Star team for the 2015 NBA D-League All-Star Game, the second time in his career. He went on to record 28 points, 4 rebounds and 4 steals, and was subsequently named the All-Star Game MVP.

On March 5, 2015, Andre Emmett left the Mad Ants and signed with the Meralco Bolts of the Philippine Basketball Association for the 2015 Governor's Cup campaign.

=== 2015–16 season ===
On July 22, 2015, Emmett was selected by the KCC EGIS(전주 KCC 이지스) with the 5th overall pick in the 2015 KBL foreigner draft.

== NBA career statistics ==
Legend
GP	Games played	GS	Games started	MPG	Minutes per game
FG%	Field goal percentage	3P%	3-point field goal percentage	FT%	Free throw percentage
RPG	Rebounds per game	APG	Assists per game	SPG	Steals per game
BPG	Blocks per game	PPG	Points per game	**Bold**	Career high

=== Regular season ===
Year	Team	GP	GS	MPG	FG%	3P%	FT%	RPG	APG	SPG	BPG	PPG
2004–05	Memphis	**8**	0	3.5	.333	.000	.600	0.3	.0	.0	.0	0.9
2011–12	New Jersey	6	0	**7.5**	**.571**	.000	**.625**	**1.0**	**0.2**	**0.3**	**0.2**	**2.2**
Career		14	0	5.2	.462	.000	.615	0.6	0.1	0.1	0.1	1.4

== Death ==
Emmett died on September 23, 2019, after being shot during an armed robbery in Dallas, Texas. He was taken to a hospital where he was later pronounced dead. He was 37 years old.
