= Jason Sasser =

American basketball player (born 1974)

Personal information
- Born: January 13, 1974 (age 52) Denton, Texas, U.S.
- Listed height: 6 ft 7 in (2.01 m)
- Listed weight: 225 lb (102 kg)

Career information
- High school: Justin F. Kimball (Dallas, Texas)
- College: Texas Tech (1992–1996)
- NBA draft: 1996: 2nd round, 41st overall pick
- Drafted by: Sacramento Kings
- Playing career: 1996–2009
- Position: Small forward
- Number: 35, 33

Career history
- 1996–1997: Sioux Falls Skyforce
- 1998: San Antonio Spurs
- 1998: Dallas Mavericks
- 1997–1998: Sioux Falls Skyforce
- 1998: Caja San Fernando
- 1998–1999: Sioux Falls Skyforce
- 2000: Vancouver Grizzlies
- 1999–2000: New Mexico Slam
- 2000–2001: Kansas City Knights
- 2001: Pop Cola Panthers
- 2001–2002: Casademont Girona
- 2002: Gary Steelheads
- 2003–2004: TSK/GHP Bamberg
- 2004–2005: Overense Aerosoles Ovar
- 2007–2008: Yakama Sun Kings
- 2008: Al Arabi
- 2008–2009: Busan KTF Magic Wings

Career highlights
- 3x CBA All-Star (1998, 1999, 2008); All-CBA First Team (1999); All-CBA Second Team (1997); CBA Rookie of the Year (1997); CBA All-Rookie First Team (1997); CBA scoring champion (1998); Third-team All-American – AP, UPI (1996); SWC Player of the Year (1996); Texas Mr. Basketball (1992)
- Stats at NBA.com
- Stats at Basketball Reference
Medals
Representing United States
FIBA Americas Championship
Gold medal – first place	1997 Montevideo	National team
World Championships
Bronze medal – third place	1998 Greece	National team

Jason Jermane Sasser (born January 13, 1974) is an American former professional basketball player. Standing at 6-foot-7-inch (201 cm) and weighing 225 pounds (102 kg), Sasser played as small forward. He graduated from Justin F. Kimball High School in Dallas, Texas, and played college basketball for the Texas Tech Red Raiders. He competed in the NBA from 1997 to 1999.

Sasser represented the US national team at the 1998 FIBA World Championship, where the team won the bronze medal.

He was selected with the 12th pick of the second round in the 1996 NBA draft by the Sacramento Kings. Over two NBA seasons, he played for three different teams. Outside the NBA, Sasser played in the Continental Basketball Association (CBA) for the Gary Steelheads and Yakama Sun Kings. He was selected as the CBA Rookie of the Year in 1997 and named to the All-CBA First Team in 1999 and Second Team in 1997. He also played overseas in Spain, Germany, Portugal, Kuwait, the Philippines, and South Korea.

Sasser's younger brother, Jeryl, also played in the NBA, and his grandfather, John Barber, was a former NBA player.
