= 1972–73 Texas Tech Red Raiders basketball team =

American college basketball season

1972–73 Texas Tech Red Raiders basketball

NCAA Division I men's basketball tournament First round, L, 78–70 v. South Carolina
- Conference: Southwest Conference
- Record: 19–18 (12–2 SWC)
- Head coach: Gerald Myers (3rd season)
- Home arena: Lubbock Municipal Coliseum

The 1972–73 Texas Tech Red Raiders men's basketball team represented Texas Tech University in the Southwest Conference during the 1972–73 NCAA University Division men's basketball season. The head coach was Gerald Myers, his 3rd year with the team. The Red Raiders played their home games in the Lubbock Municipal Coliseum in Lubbock, Texas.
