= Jarrett Culver =

American basketball player (born 1999)

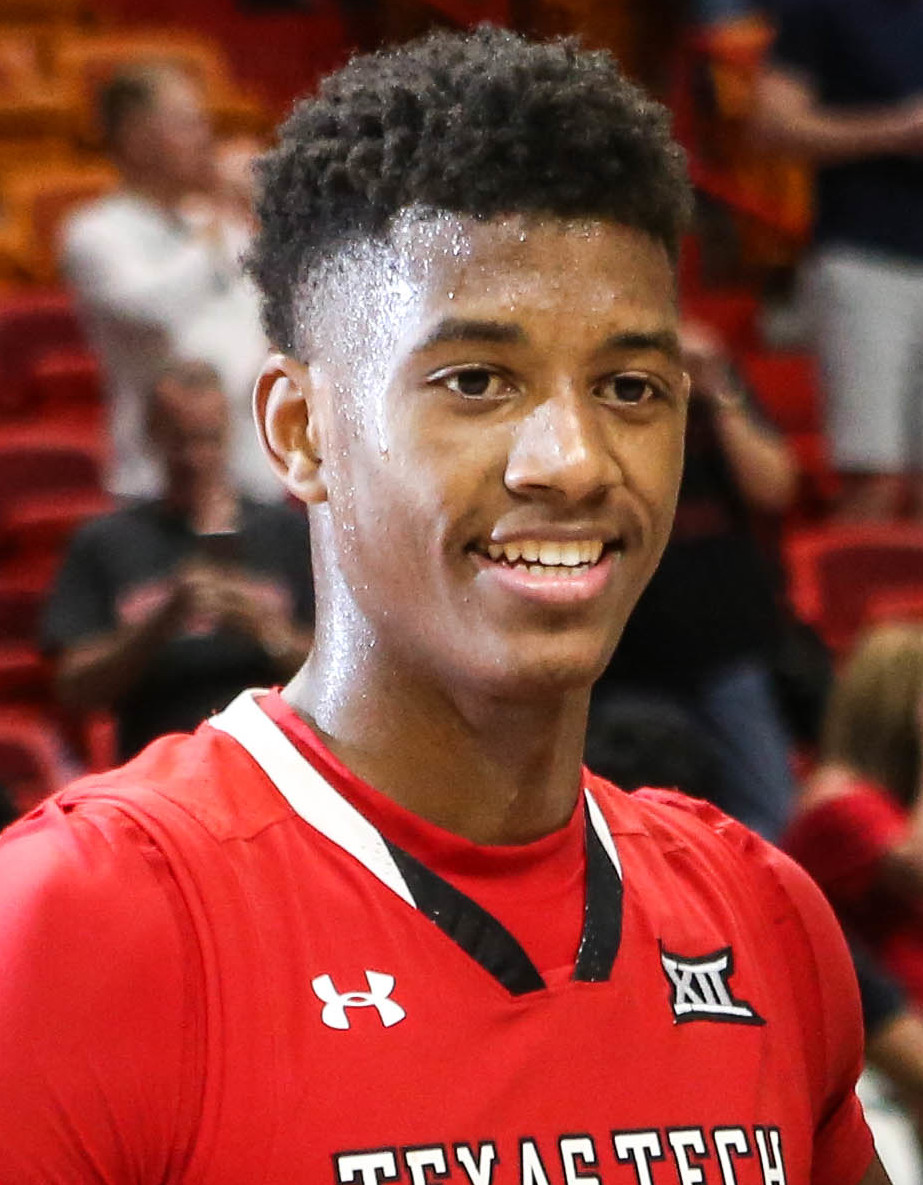
- Culver with Texas Tech in 2018

No. 8 – Sendai 89ers
- Position: Shooting guard / small forward
- League: B.League

Personal information
- Born: February 20, 1999 (age 27) Dallas, Texas, U.S.
- Listed height: 6 ft 6 in (1.98 m)
- Listed weight: 195 lb (88 kg)

Career information
- High school: Coronado (Lubbock, Texas)
- College: Texas Tech (2017–2019)
- NBA draft: 2019: 1st round, 6th overall pick
- Drafted by: Phoenix Suns
- Playing career: 2019–present

Career history
- 2019–2021: Minnesota Timberwolves
- 2021–2022: Memphis Grizzlies
- 2021: →Memphis Hustle
- 2022–2023: Atlanta Hawks
- 2022–2023: →College Park Skyhawks
- 2023–2024: Rio Grande Valley Vipers
- 2024–2025: Osceola Magic
- 2025–present: Sendai 89ers

Career highlights
- Consensus second-team All-American (2019); Big 12 Player of the Year (2019); First-team All-Big 12 (2019)
- Stats at NBA.com
- Stats at Basketball Reference

Jarrett Ryan Culver (born February 20, 1999) is an American professional basketball player for the Sendai 89ers of the B.League. He played college basketball for the Texas Tech Red Raiders, and was drafted by the Phoenix Suns with the sixth overall selection of the 2019 NBA draft.

== Early life ==
Culver was born to Regina and Hiawatha Culver Jr. in Dallas, Texas. At the age of three he moved to Lubbock, Texas, where he grew up. His father is a pastor at Rising Star Baptist Church, his mother a director of a local Head Start. Culver grew up playing football and soccer before focusing on basketball while at Irons Middle School. He often played NBA 2K and pickup basketball in his driveway with his older brothers, Trey and J.J.

== High school career ==
Culver attended Coronado High School in Lubbock, where he played basketball under head coach Randy Dean. He averaged 20 points per game as a junior, leading his team to the 6A regional semifinals. Culver was named Lone Star Varsity Player of the Year by Lubbock Avalanche-Journal. In his senior campaign, he averaged about 30 points per game and led his team in rebounds and assists. At the start of the season, Culver re-aggravated a shoulder injury he originally suffered as a junior, but he still led Coronado to the playoffs and repeated as Lone Star Varsity Player of the Year. Culver was a consensus three-star recruit and committed to Texas Tech on September 22, 2016. He had offers from several other NCAA Division I programs, including Baylor, Texas and Illinois.

College recruiting
Name	Hometown	School	Height	Weight	Commit date
Jarrett Culver; SG	Lubbock, TX	Coronado (TX)	6 ft 5 in (1.96 m)	175 lb (79 kg)	Sep 22, 2016
Jarrett Culver; SG	Recruit ratings: Rivals: 247Sports: ESPN:				
Overall recruit ranking: 247Sports: 312, 64 (SG), 24 (TX) ESPN: 43 (SG), 17 (TX)
Note: In many cases, Scout, Rivals, 247Sports, On3, and ESPN may conflict in their listings of height and weight.; In these cases, the average was taken. ESPN grades are on a 100-point scale.; Sources: "2017 Team Ranking". Rivals.

== College career ==
=== Freshman season ===
On November 10, 2017, Culver debuted for Texas Tech in a 75–50 win over South Alabama, scoring 2 points in 16 minutes. He recorded a season high in non-conference play against Wofford on November 22, scoring 21 points. In his next game, Culver recorded 18 points and a season-best 7 assists in a 103–69 win over Savannah State. Two days later, he was named Big 12 Conference Newcomer of the Week. On December 16, Culver chipped in 8 points and a season-high 6 steals against Rice. He recorded his first double-double on February 26, 2018, versus West Virginia, with season bests of 26 points and 12 rebounds. As a freshman, Culver averaged 11.2 points, 4.8 rebounds and 1.1 steals per game. He scored 229 points in conference play, breaking the Texas Tech freshman record set by Martin Zeno in 2005.

=== Sophomore season ===
Entering his sophomore season, Culver was named preseason All-Big 12 honorable mention. He was also one of 20 players to make the 2019 Jerry West Award watch list. Culver assumed a leading role in his second year, with the departures of key players Zhaire Smith and Keenan Evans. He made his debut on November 6, 2018, recording 16 points and 4 assists in an 87–37 win over Incarnate Word. On November 20, Culver scored 26 points against Nebraska to win most valuable player (MVP) honors at the Hall of Fame Classic. The next day, he became one of 20 players to be named to the Oscar Robertson Trophy midseason watch list. Culver erupted for 30 points, shooting 12-of-13 from the field, in a December 15 victory over Abilene Christian. Shortly after, he earned Big 12 Player of the Week honors. On March 9, 2019, Culver scored 31 points against Iowa State, which was not only a season high, but also a career high.

After leading the Red Raiders to a share of the Big 12 regular season title, he was named Big 12 Player of the Year at the end of conference play. In the quarterfinals of the 2019 Big 12 men's basketball tournament, despite him scoring 26 points and hauling in 10 rebounds, Culver and the Red Raiders were upset by #10 seed West Virginia. In the first round of the 2019 NCAA Division I men's basketball tournament, Culver nearly recorded a triple-double with 29 points, 8 rebounds and 7 assists against #14 seed Northern Kentucky. In the second round, Culver helped lead to another win against #6 seed Buffalo, recording a double-double of 16 points and 10 rebounds. He also recorded 5 assists, 3 steals and 2 blocks against #6 seed Buffalo. In the regional semifinals (the Sweet 16), he helped lead the Red Raiders to a historic upset over the #2 seed Michigan, scoring 22 points. In the Regional Finals (the Elite Eight), he again led Texas Tech with 19 points and another upset against #1 seed Gonzaga, resulting in the program's first-ever appearance in the national semifinals (the Final Four). Culver struggled in the Final Four game against Michigan State, scoring 10 points on 3-of-12 shooting, in a 61–51 Texas Tech win. In the championship game, Culver again struggled, scoring 15 points on 5-of-22 shooting in an 85–77 overtime loss to Virginia. After the season, Culver declared for the 2019 NBA draft.

== Professional career ==
=== Minnesota Timberwolves (2019–2021) ===
Culver was selected as the 6th pick of the 2019 NBA draft by the Phoenix Suns. His draft rights were immediately traded to the Minnesota Timberwolves in exchange for Dario Šarić and the eleventh pick of the draft. The trade was officially completed on July 6. Two days later, Culver signed his rookie-scale contract with the Wolves. On October 23, 2019, he made his NBA debut, coming off from bench in a 127–126 overtime win over the Brooklyn Nets with four points, two assists and one steal. On January 18, 2020, Culver scored a career-high 26 points, alongside four rebounds and two blocks, in a 112–122 loss to the Toronto Raptors.

On January 3, 2021, Culver recorded a season-high 20 points, alongside six rebounds and three steals, in a 109–124 loss to the Denver Nuggets. On April 29, the Timberwolves announced that Culver would undergo season-ending right ankle surgery on May 7. During the 2020–21 season, Culver saw his role reduced from his rookie year.

=== Memphis Grizzlies / Hustle (2021–2022) ===
On August 25, 2021, Culver was traded, alongside Juancho Hernangómez, to the Memphis Grizzlies in exchange for Patrick Beverley. In October, the Grizzlies declined Culver's fourth-year option. On April 10, 2022, he scored a season-high 14 points in a 110–139 loss to the Boston Celtics. On April 19, during the first round of the playoffs, Culver made his playoff debut, recording two points, three rebounds and two steals in a 124–96 game 2 win over the Minnesota Timberwolves. The Grizzlies ended up winning the series in six games and advanced to the second round to face the eventual champions, the Golden State Warriors. The Grizzlies lost to the Warriors in six games.

=== Atlanta Hawks / College Park Skyhawks (2022–2023) ===
On September 12, 2022, Culver signed a two-way contract with the Atlanta Hawks. On January 14, 2023, he was waived by the Hawks.

=== Rio Grande Valley Vipers (2023–2024) ===
On January 26, 2023, Culver was traded to the Rio Grande Valley Vipers.

=== Osceola Magic (2024–2025) ===
On September 11, 2024, Culver signed with the Orlando Magic, but was waived on October 19. Eight days later, he joined the Osceola Magic.

=== Sendai 89ers (2025–present) ===
On June 20, 2025, Culver signed with the Sendai 89ers of the B.League.

== Career statistics ==
Legend
GP	Games played	GS	Games started	MPG	Minutes per game
FG%	Field goal percentage	3P%	3-point field goal percentage	FT%	Free throw percentage
RPG	Rebounds per game	APG	Assists per game	SPG	Steals per game
BPG	Blocks per game	PPG	Points per game	**Bold**	Career high

=== NBA ===
==== Regular season ====
Year	Team	GP	GS	MPG	FG%	3P%	FT%	RPG	APG	SPG	BPG	PPG
2019–20	Minnesota	**63**	**35**	**23.9**	.404	**.299**	.462	3.4	**1.7**	**.9**	**.6**	**9.2**
2020–21	Minnesota	35	7	14.7	**.411**	.245	.604	3.1	.7	.5	.3	5.3
2021–22	Memphis	37	0	9.1	.378	.255	.471	1.3	.9	.5	.1	3.5
2022–23	Atlanta	10	1	13.7	.395	.083	**.692**	**3.8**	.6	.6	.2	4.4
Career		144	43	17.2	.401	.276	.509	2.8	1.2	.7	.4	6.5

==== Playoffs ====
Year	Team	GP	GS	MPG	FG%	3P%	FT%	RPG	APG	SPG	BPG	PPG
2022	Memphis	3	0	7.3	.300	.000	.500	2.3	.3	.7	.0	2.3
Career		3	0	7.3	.300	.000	.500	2.3	.3	.7	.0	2.3

=== College ===
Year	Team	GP	GS	MPG	FG%	3P%	FT%	RPG	APG	SPG	BPG	PPG
2017–18	Texas Tech	37	20	26.4	.455	**.382**	.648	4.8	1.8	1.1	**.7**	11.2
2018–19	Texas Tech	**38**	**38**	**32.5**	**.461**	.304	**.707**	**6.4**	**3.7**	**1.4**	.6	**18.5**
Career		75	58	29.5	.459	.341	.687	5.6	2.8	1.3	.6	14.9

== Personal life ==
Culver is a Christian. His father, Hiawatha Culver Jr. is the Texas Tech team chaplain and delivered the pre-game prayer for Texas Tech before each home basketball game. In high school, Jarrett played basketball with older brother J.J., who later joined the team at Wayland Baptist University. Trey Culver, his oldest brother, was a decorated athlete for the Texas Tech track and field team in the high jump, tying the fourth-best mark in collegiate indoor history in 2018.
