= Will Flemons =

American basketball player

Personal information
- Listed height: 6 ft 8 in (2.03 m)

Career information
- High school: Paducah (Paducah, Texas)
- College: Texas Tech (1989–1993)
- NBA draft: 1993: undrafted
- Position: Forward

Career history

Playing
- 1993–1994: (France)

Coaching
- 1994–1997: Texas Tech (men's asst.)
- 1997–1999: All Saints Episcopal School
- 1999–2001: Texas Tech (men's asst.)
- 2001–2002: Bucknell (women's asst.)
- 2002–2003: Texas State (women's asst.)
- 2003–2007: Wayland Baptist (women's HC)
- 2007–2014: Brazoswood HS (boys' HC)
- 2014–present: Paducah HS (boys' HC)

Career highlights
- SWC Player of the Year (1992); 2× First-team All-SWC (1992, 1993); SWC Freshman of the Year (1990)

Will Flemons is an American former college basketball player best known for his career at Texas Tech in the early 1990s. Between 1989–90 and 1992–93, Flemons scored 1,604 points (fourth all-time at his graduation) and was a two-time first-team all-Southwest Conference selection in 1992 and 1993. Flemons was also named the SWC Freshman of the Year in 1990, and was also named the SWC Player of the Year in 1992. As a senior in 1992–93 he led the Red Raiders to a SWC championship and an appearance in the NCAA Tournament. He then played professionally in France for one year after graduating before returning to the United States to pursue a coaching career. Since 1994, Flemons has served as both an assistant or head coach at the high school and college levels for men's and women's programs. As of February 2014 he serves as the head boys' basketball coach at Paducah High School in Paducah, Texas.
