= Texas Tech Red Raiders basketball =

College men's basketball team representing Texas Tech University

Texas Tech Red Raiders men's basketball
2026–27 Texas Tech Red Raiders basketball team
- University: Texas Tech University
- First season: 1925–26; 101 years ago
- Athletic director: Kirby Hocutt
- Head coach: Grant McCasland; 4th season, 74–31 (.705)
- Location: Lubbock, Texas
- Arena: United Supermarkets Arena (capacity: 15,300)
- NCAA division: Division I
- Conference: Big 12 Conference
- Nickname: Red Raiders
- Colors: Scarlet and black
- Student section: Raider Riot
- All-time record: 1,578–1,190 (.570)
- NCAA tournament record: 23–23 (.500)

NCAA Division I tournament runner-up
- 2019
Other NCAA Division I tournament results
Final Four	2019
Elite Eight	2018, 2019, 2025
Sweet Sixteen	1961, 1962, 1976, 1996, 2005, 2018, 2019, 2022, 2025
Appearances	1954, 1956, 1961, 1962, 1973, 1976, 1985, 1986, 1993, 1995, 1996, 2002, 2004, 2005, 2007, 2016, 2018, 2019, 2021, 2022, 2024, 2025, 2026

Conference tournament champions
- SWC: 1976, 1985, 1986, 1993, 1996

Conference regular-season champions
- Border: 1933, 1934, 1935, 1954, 1956 SWC: 1961, 1962, 1973, 1985, 1995, 1996 Big 12: 2019

Uniforms
Home	Away	Alternate

The Texas Tech Red Raiders basketball team represents Texas Tech University in basketball. Texas Tech competes in NCAA Division I and has been a charter member of the Big 12 Conference since its first season in 1996. The team previously competed in the Border Conference and Southwest Conference. The team was founded in 1925, having since won 13 regular season conference championship, and made 22 appearances in the NCAA tournament as of the 2025–2026 season. Since 1999, the Red Raiders have played their home games at the United Supermarkets Arena on the university's campus in Lubbock, Texas.

== History ==
=== 1925–1935 ===
Texas Tech's basketball program was founded the same year the school opened its doors in 1925. The inaugural game was a 37–25 loss to Daniel Baker College. Tech would lose two more games before finally clinching their first ever victory—35–21 at Sul Ross University.

Grady Higginbotham was the first coach, earning a 14–18 record over two seasons. Until Pat Knight, Higgenbotham was the only Tech basketball coach to garner an overall losing record (.438) during his stay. Following Higgenbotham's departure, Victor Payne led the Matadors (as the school's teams were known until 1936) from 1927 to 1930. His final tally stood at 32 wins and 20 losses. W. L. Golightly coached only one season, bringing in an 11–9 record. Dell Morgan held the head coaching job from 1931 to 1934, chalking up 42 wins to 29 losses. He was followed by Virgil Ballard. Though Ballard coached only a single season, it was during his time that the team won their milestone 100th game, a one-point victory over House of David. Ballard left with a 15–9 record.

Polk Robison

=== 1935–1971 ===
Berl Huffman was twice the head basketball coach at Texas Tech—first from 1935 to 1942 and then from 1946 to 1947. During his total of eight seasons, he garnered a record of 121–67. Polk Robison was the only other person to serve two different times as the head basketball coach at the school. When Huffman left in 1942, Robison took the job. And, when Huffman left a second time in 1947, it was Robison who again filled the position, this time remaining until 1961. At a total of 18 seasons, his stay is the second longest of any Red Raiders basketball coach, behind Gerald Myers. He departed after leading his teams to 254 wins, 195 losses, and the first two NCAA tournaments in school history.

Gene Gibson followed Robison into the position. In his eight seasons, he chalked up the second best conference record in Texas Tech history and led the Raiders to a Southwest Conference Championship in 1962. Bob Bass led the program to a 22–15 record over a season-and-a-half before returning to professional basketball coaching duties.

=== 1971–2001 ===
Gerald Myers became coach of the Red Raiders mid-year during the 1970/71 season and stayed until 1991. His stay was the longest of any head basketball coach at Tech, and several milestones were passed during his tenure, including wins #600 (TCU), #700 (SMU), #800 (at SMU), and #900 (Texas A&M). With a Texas Tech career record of 326–261, Myers has more wins with the Red Raiders than any other men's basketball coach in school history. Myers led Tech to 16 winning seasons, two Southwest Conference championships, three SWC tournament titles, and four NCAA tournament berths. Myers served as the school's athletic director from 1996 to 2011.

James Dickey replaced Myers as head coach prior to the 1991/92 season and would remain at Texas Tech until his dismissal at the end of the 2000/01 season. During his 10 seasons at Texas Tech, Dickey amassed a 166–124 win–loss record (164–123 with vacated games omitted). The program also won its 1,000th game under Dickey—a 71–62 victory at UALR.

Dickey took over a Texas Tech program that had finished with a 13–45 combined record over Myers' final two years and led his first team to a winning season and fifth-place finish in Southwest Conference play, after having been picked to finish last in the conference. In his second year as head coach, the Red Raiders won the Southwest Conference tournament championship, the school's fourth, to secure the league's automatic bid to the NCAA tournament. Texas Tech finished the 1994/95 season with a 20–10 record, sharing the SWC regular season championship with Texas and earning a berth in the 1995 National Invitation Tournament. In the SWC's final season, Dickey's 1995–96 Red Raiders produced one of the most successful seasons in school history and one of the more memorable seasons in the history of the conference, finishing 30–2 overall and undefeated in conference play, winning both the SWC regular season championship and the conference tournament title, advancing to the "Sweet Sixteen" in the NCAA Tournament, and finishing #8 in the AP poll and #10 in the Coaches' Poll.

The Raiders moved to the Big 12 for the 1996/97 season, and appeared to pick up right where they left off with a solid 19–9 season. For all intents and purposes, however, Dickey's tenure ended on the first day of the inaugural Big 12 basketball tournament. During the Raiders' first-round game, it was discovered that two players had played the entire season while academically ineligible. Hours after that game, Texas Tech announced that it was withdrawing from postseason consideration and forfeiting its entire conference schedule. The Raiders had lost that game, and would have had to forfeit it if they had won. A subsequent investigation revealed massive violations dating back to 1990 in men's basketball and nine other sports. As a result, the NCAA stripped Tech of its two NCAA tournament wins in 1996 and docked it nine scholarships over four years. Dickey was unable to recover from the lost scholarships, and his Red Raiders finished with four consecutive losing seasons, during which they only won a total of 18 games in Big 12 play. He was fired after his 2000/01 team produced a 9–19 overall record.

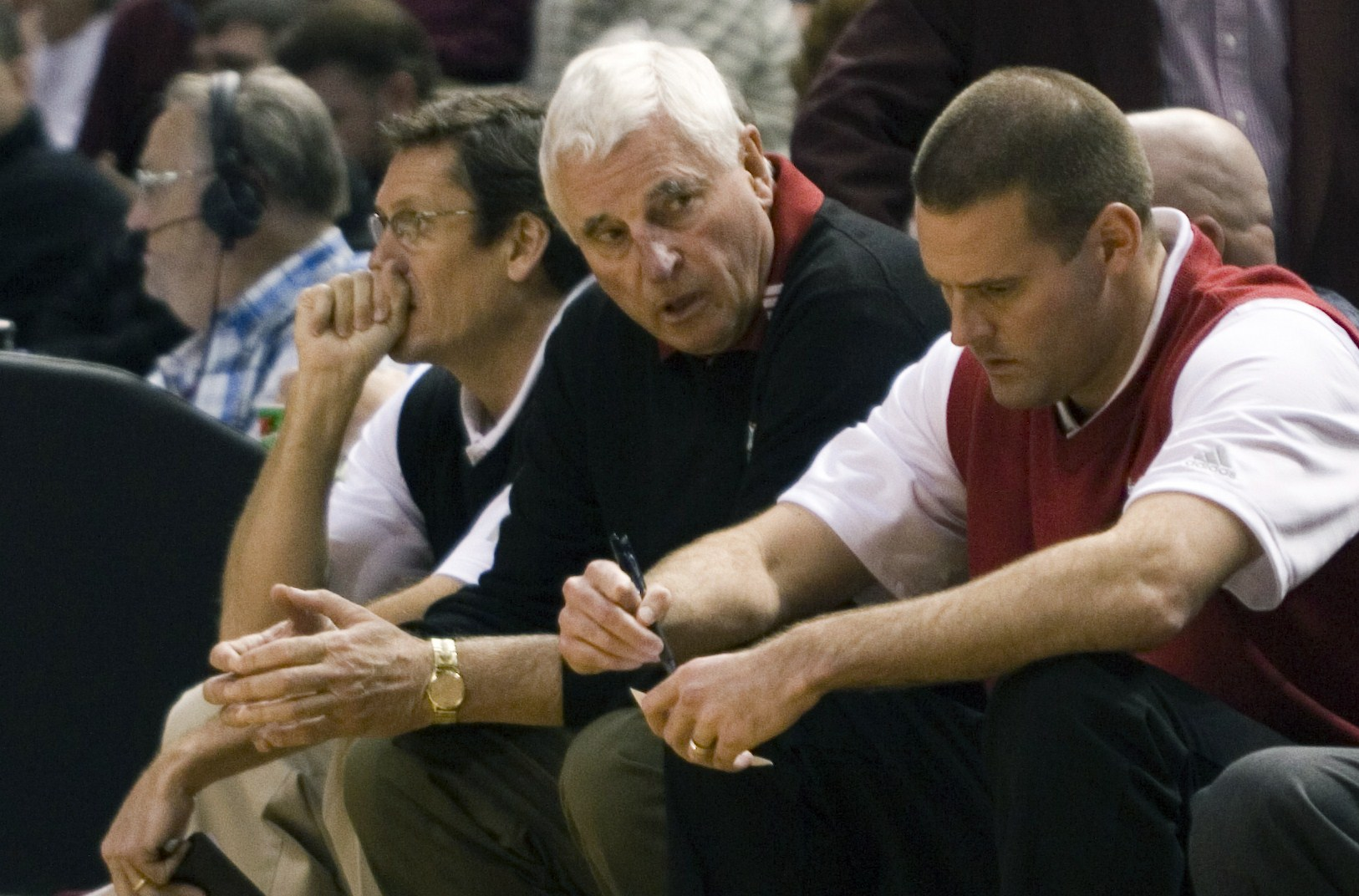
Bob Knight (middle) with Pat Knight (right)

=== Bob Knight era: 2001–2008 ===
Bob Knight served as the Texas Tech men's basketball head coach from 2001–2008.

Hired in March 2001 to replace James Dickey as head coach, Bob Knight quickly improved the program, which had not received a bid to the NCAA tournament nor achieved a winning record since 1996. Knight led the Red Raiders to three NCAA Tournament appearances and one NIT appearance in his first four years at Texas Tech, including an appearance in the Sweet Sixteen in 2005. Texas Tech finished the 2005/06 season with a 15–17 overall record, marking the only time that Knight finished a complete season at Tech with a losing record and fewer than 21 wins. During the 2005–06 season, the ESPN reality TV show centering on Knight and the Red Raiders, Knight School, was filmed. The Red Raiders recovered in 2006/07, finishing 21–13 and again earning a bid to the NCAA Tournament, where they would lose to Boston College in the first round. In both 2006 and 2007, Knight's Texas Tech teams defeated two top 10-ranked teams in consecutive weeks. During Knight's first six years at Texas Tech, the Red Raiders won 126 games, an average of 21 wins per season.

On New Year's Day 2007, Texas Tech recorded a 70–68 defeat of New Mexico to give Knight his 880th career victory, making him the highest winning coach in men's college basketball history.

On January 16, 2008, Knight registered his 900th career victory when the Red Raiders upset the ninth-ranked Texas A&M Aggies, 68–53. Knight won two more games as head coach—against Missouri and Oklahoma State—prior to announcing his retirement on February 4, 2008, after having led his 2007–08 team to a 12–8 mid-season record. His son Pat Knight, the head coach designate since 2005, was immediately named as his successor. The younger Knight stated that, after many years of coaching, his father was exhausted and ready to retire.

Bob Knight finished with an overall win–loss record of 138–82 at Texas Tech.

=== Pat Knight era: 2008–2011 ===
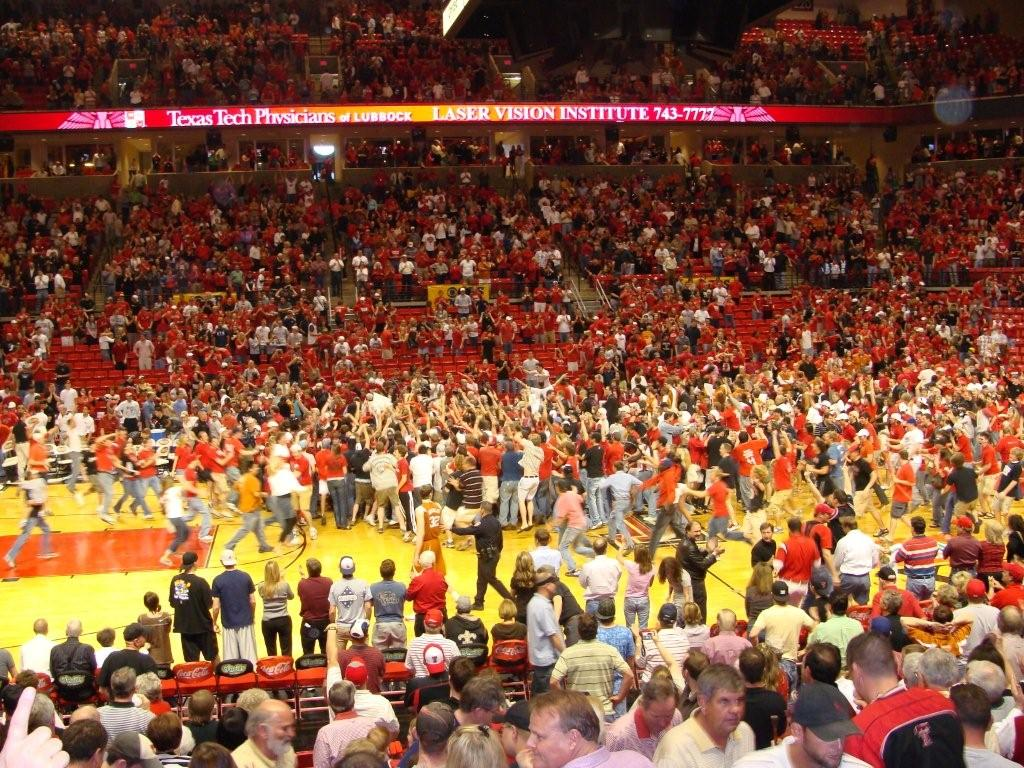
Students and fans rush the court after the unranked Red Raiders upset the #5 Texas Longhorns in 2008.

After assuming the head coaching role midseason, Pat Knight's initial two games were defeats on the road. The first was an 80–74 loss to Baylor on February 6, 2008. The second came three days later at Nebraska. Knight's first head coaching win came at home when the Red Raiders upset #18 Kansas State, 84–75, at United Spirit Arena. Going into the game, KSU was in sole possession of first place in the Big 12. On March 1, 2008, the Red Raiders again defeated the top team in the conference by beating #5 Texas, 83–80, ending a month-long, eight-game winning streak for the Longhorns.

The Red Raiders finished the regular season with back-to-back losses, first at Kansas and then to Baylor. At the 2008 Big 12 men's basketball tournament, they added another loss—to Oklahoma State—in the first round. The team did not receive an invitation to play at either the NCAA Division I Men's Basketball Championship or at the National Invitation Tournament. Texas Tech did get an invitation to the inaugural College Basketball Invitational, but declined the offer.

In the third game of the 2008–09 season, Tech defeated Division II opponent East Central 167–115, setting a new school record for most points scored in a game. The previous record of 128 was set in the double overtime victory over Texas on February 20, 1994. The combined total of 282 points also became a new record.

On March 7, 2011, Texas Tech terminated Knight's position as head coach. He left with an overall record of 50–61, becoming the second coach in the school's history to depart with more losses than wins.

=== Billy Gillispie era: 2011–2012 ===
Billy Gillispie became the head coach of the team on March 20, 2011. He only stayed for one season before resigning on September 21, 2012, in the wake of a school investigation into his treatment of his players.

=== Tubby Smith era: 2013–2016 ===
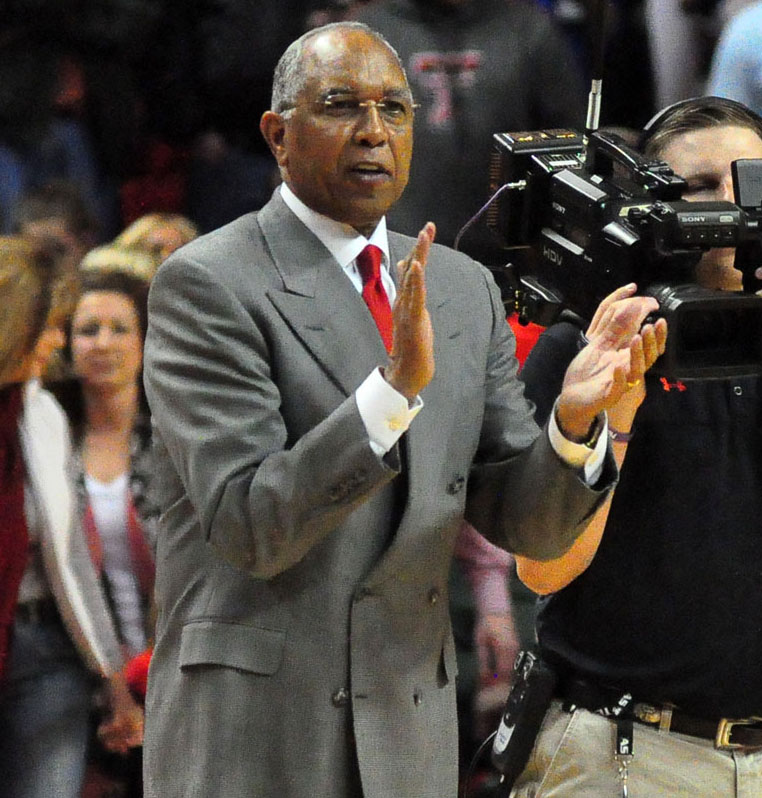
Texas Tech University head basketball coach Tubby Smith during the 2013–14 season

Tubby Smith was hired to replace interim head coach Chris Walker on April 1, 2013, after 6 seasons as head coach of Minnesota. Smith's first season showed some signs of progress, with Texas Tech picking up its first victory over a top-25 team since 2009. Texas Tech's victory over the then #12 Baylor Bears was the first win over a ranked opponent since December 2009, when the team defeated #10 Washington. Smith would later earn another top 25 upset with a victory over #19 Oklahoma State on February 8, 2014. Following outreach by Smith and the athletic department, Texas Tech students broke both school and Big 12 Conference records for student attendance at the United Spirit Arena during a February 25, 2014, loss to Kansas State. The record of 6,086 students fell less than 2,000 short of the national record.

The Red Raiders ended Smith's first season with a home victory over the Texas Longhorns, but the Raiders fell to Oklahoma State in the first round of the Big 12 tournament in March. They ended the season with a 14–18 overall record, Smith's first losing season as a head coach.

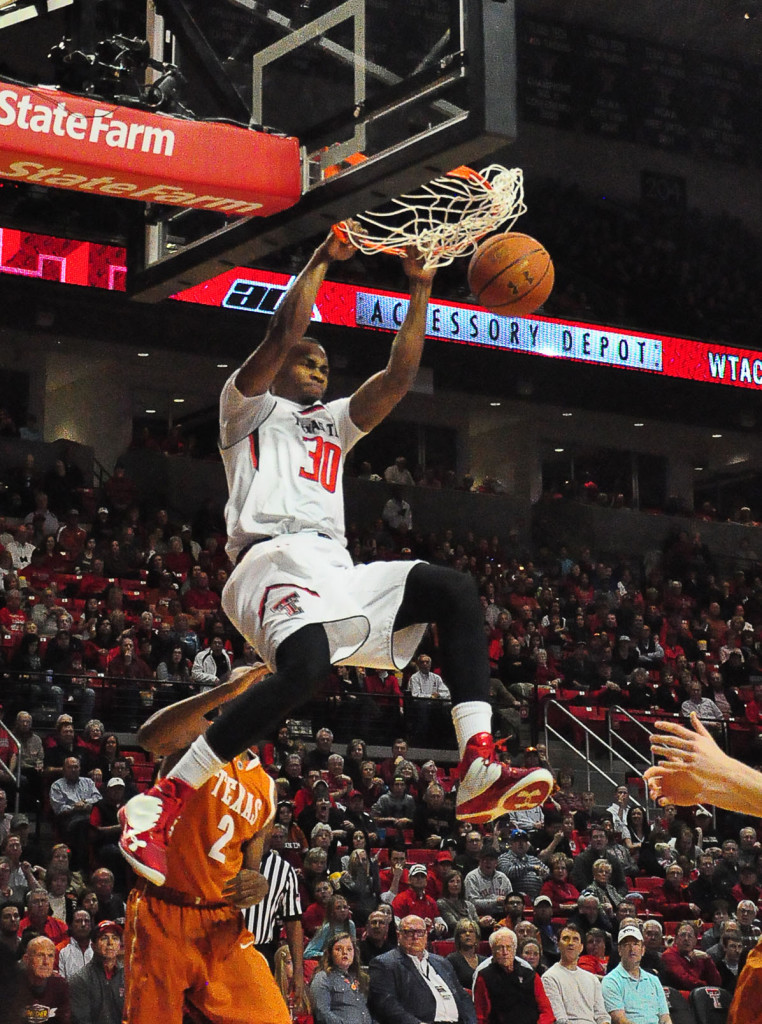
Texas Tech forward Jaye Crockett slams the ball home during the Red Raiders' win against the University of Texas Longhorns on March 8, 2014.

Under Smith, the 2015–2016 Red Raiders finished 9–9 in Big 12 play and advanced to their first NCAA Tournament in nine years, earning an 8-seed in the East Regional. Their season ended in the Round of 64 with a loss to the 9-seed Butler Bulldogs.

Following the season, the Smith era came to an end as Smith resigned on April 14 to coach the Memphis Tigers.

=== Chris Beard era: 2016–2021 ===
Texas Tech hired former Arkansas-Little Rock coach Chris Beard on April 15, 2016, a week after he was appointed to the same position at UNLV. In his second season at the helm, Texas Tech reached the Elite Eight for the first time in school history, with a 78–65 win over the Purdue Boilermakers, where they lost to the eventual national champions, the Villanova Wildcats, 71–59.

With a share of the Big 12 regular season title, the Red Raiders returned to the NCAA Tournament in 2019 as a #3 seed. Their second trip to the Elite Eight in as many years saw them defeat the #1 seed Gonzaga Bulldogs 75–69, clinching their first ever Final Four appearance. They proceeded to defeat the Michigan State Spartans 61–51, reaching their first-ever national title game, where they ultimately lost to another #1 seed, the Virginia Cavaliers, 85–77 in overtime, ending the most successful season in school history.

Beard departed the program after the 2020–21 season, to take the head coaching job at his alma mater, the University of Texas. Given the rivalry between the two schools, Texas Tech athletic director Kirby Hocutt later remarked, "Had he gone to any other university, he'd be celebrated. But there's just certain things you cannot do, and one of them is you can't leave Texas Tech for Texas."

=== Mark Adams era: 2021–2023 ===
Mark Adams, a Texas Tech alumnus and longtime coach around West Texas who had served as Beard's assistant for the last six seasons, was elevated to head coach on April 5, 2021. The Dustin R. Womble Basketball Center, a new 58,000-square foot, $32.2 million practice facility for the men and women's basketball teams, was inaugurated a month later. Coach Adams swept former coach Chris Beard and the University of Texas in his first season at the helm.

On March 5, 2023, Texas Tech University announced that they suspended Coach Adams for using "racially insensitive" terms and possibly spitting on a player; Corey Williams led the team in the Big 12 tournament. On March 8, Adams resigned his position.

=== Grant McCasland era: 2023–Present ===
On March 31, 2023, Grant McCasland was hired as the 19th head coach of the Red Raiders. He had previously been the head coach of North Texas. Previously, he worked as the Director of Basketball Operations at Texas Tech from 1999-2001. He also earned his master's degree from Texas Tech in 2001. In Coach McCasland's first season, he notched a 23-11 record including a berth to the NCAA Tournament. The Red Raiders were upset in the first round by NC State.

In 2024–25, McCasland guided the Red Raiders to a top-10 AP ranking and a No. 3 seed in the NCAA tournament. The Red Raiders advanced to their third Elite Eight as a program and their first under a coach not named Chris Beard.

== Postseason ==
=== NCAA tournament results ===
The Red Raiders have appeared in the NCAA tournament 22 times, with the 1996 appearance subsequently being vacated. Their combined record is 23–22.

On April 6, 2019, Texas Tech earned their first trip to the NCAA tournament championship game with a Final Four win over Michigan State. Two days later, the Red Raiders lost the NCAA tournament championship game in overtime 85–77 to Virginia.

Year	Seed	Round	Opponent	Result
1954		First Round	Santa Clara	L 64–73
1956		First Round	SMU	L 67–68
1961		Sweet Sixteen; Regional 3rd Place Game	Cincinnati; Houston	L 55–78; W 69–67
1962		First Round; Sweet Sixteen; Regional 3rd Place Game	Air Force; Colorado; Creighton	W 68–66; L 60–67; L 61–63
1973		First Round	South Carolina	L 70–78
1976		First Round; Sweet Sixteen	Syracuse; Missouri	W 69–56; L 75–86
1985	#6	First Round	#11 Boston College	L 53–55
1986	#13	First Round	#4 Georgetown	L 64–70
1993	#12	First Round	#5 St. John's	L 67–85
1996	#3	First Round; Second Round; Sweet Sixteen	#14 Northern Illinois #6 North Carolina #2 Georgetown	W 74–73; W 92–73; L 90–98
2002	#6	First Round	#11 Southern Illinois	L 68–76
2004	#8	First Round; Second Round	#9 Charlotte #1 Saint Joseph's	W 76–73; L 65–70
2005	#6	First Round; Second Round; Sweet Sixteen	#11 UCLA #3 Gonzaga #7 West Virginia	W 78–66; W 71–69; L 60–65
2007	#10	First Round	#7 Boston College	L 75–84
2016	#8	First Round	#9 Butler	L 61–71
2018	#3	First Round; Second Round; Sweet Sixteen; Elite Eight	#14 Stephen F. Austin #6 Florida #2 Purdue #1 Villanova	W 70–60; W 69–66; W 78–65; L 59–71
2019	#3	First Round; Second Round; Sweet Sixteen; Elite Eight; Final Four; National Championship	#14 Northern Kentucky #6 Buffalo #2 Michigan #1 Gonzaga #2 (E) Michigan State #1 (S) Virginia	W 72–57; W 78–58; W 63–44; W 75–69; W 61–51; L 77–85^{OT}
2021	#6	First Round; Second Round	#11 Utah State #3 Arkansas	W 65–53; L 66–68
2022	#3	First Round; Second Round; Sweet Sixteen	#14 Montana State #11 Notre Dame #2 Duke	W 97–62; W 59–53; L 73–78
2024	#6	First Round	#11 NC State	L 67–80
2025	#3	First Round; Second Round; Sweet Sixteen; Elite Eight	#14 UNC Wilmington #11 Drake #10 Arkansas #1 Florida	W 82–72; W 77–64; W 85–83^{OT} L 79–84
2026	#5	First Round	#12 Akron #4 Alabama	W 91–71; L 65-90

=== NIT results ===
The Red Raiders have appeared in the National Invitation Tournament (NIT) four times. Their combined record is 6–4.

Year	Round	Opponent	Result
1979	First Round	Indiana	L 59–78
1995	First Round	Washington State	L 82–94
2003	First Round; Second Round; Quarterfinals; Semifinals; 3rd Place Game	Nevada; San Diego State; Georgia Tech; St. John's; Minnesota	W 66–54; W 57–48; W 80–72; L 63–64; W 71–61
2010	First Round; Second Round; Quarterfinals	Seton Hall; Jacksonville; Ole Miss	W 87–69; W 69–64; L 87–90^{2OT}

=== NAIA tournament results ===
The Red Raiders have appeared in the NAIA tournament two times. Their combined record is 3–2.

Year	Round	Opponent	Result
1942	First Round; Second Round	Louisiana Tech; Southeastern Oklahoma State	W 59–47; L 36–37
1949	First Round; Second Round; Quarterfinals	Western Montana; North Dakota; Hamline	W 79–43; W 62–57; L 56–80

== Home arenas ==
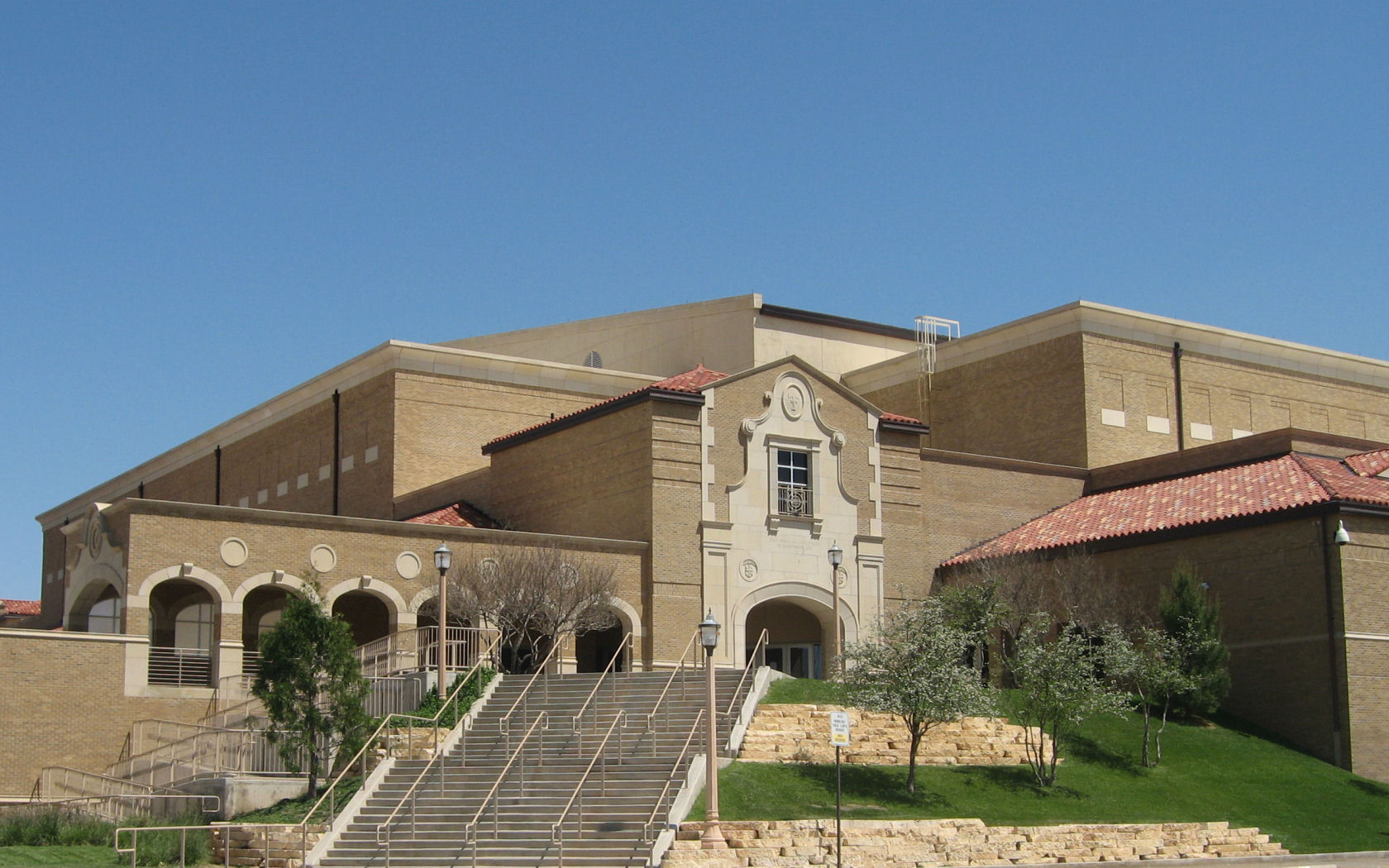
United Supermarkets Arena

The Red Raiders play their home games at United Supermarkets Arena located on the university campus. The Red Raiders previously played at Lubbock Municipal Coliseum until United Supermarkets Arena opened in 1999. The university's first team, then known as the Matadors, did not have a home court but instead played at the Livestock Judging Pavilion until a wood and stucco barn was constructed the following season.

Texas Tech students broke both school and Big 12 Conference records for student attendance at the United Supermarkets Arena during a February 25, 2014, loss to Kansas State. The record of 6,086 students fell less than 2,000 short of the national record.

== Players ==
=== AP All Americans ===
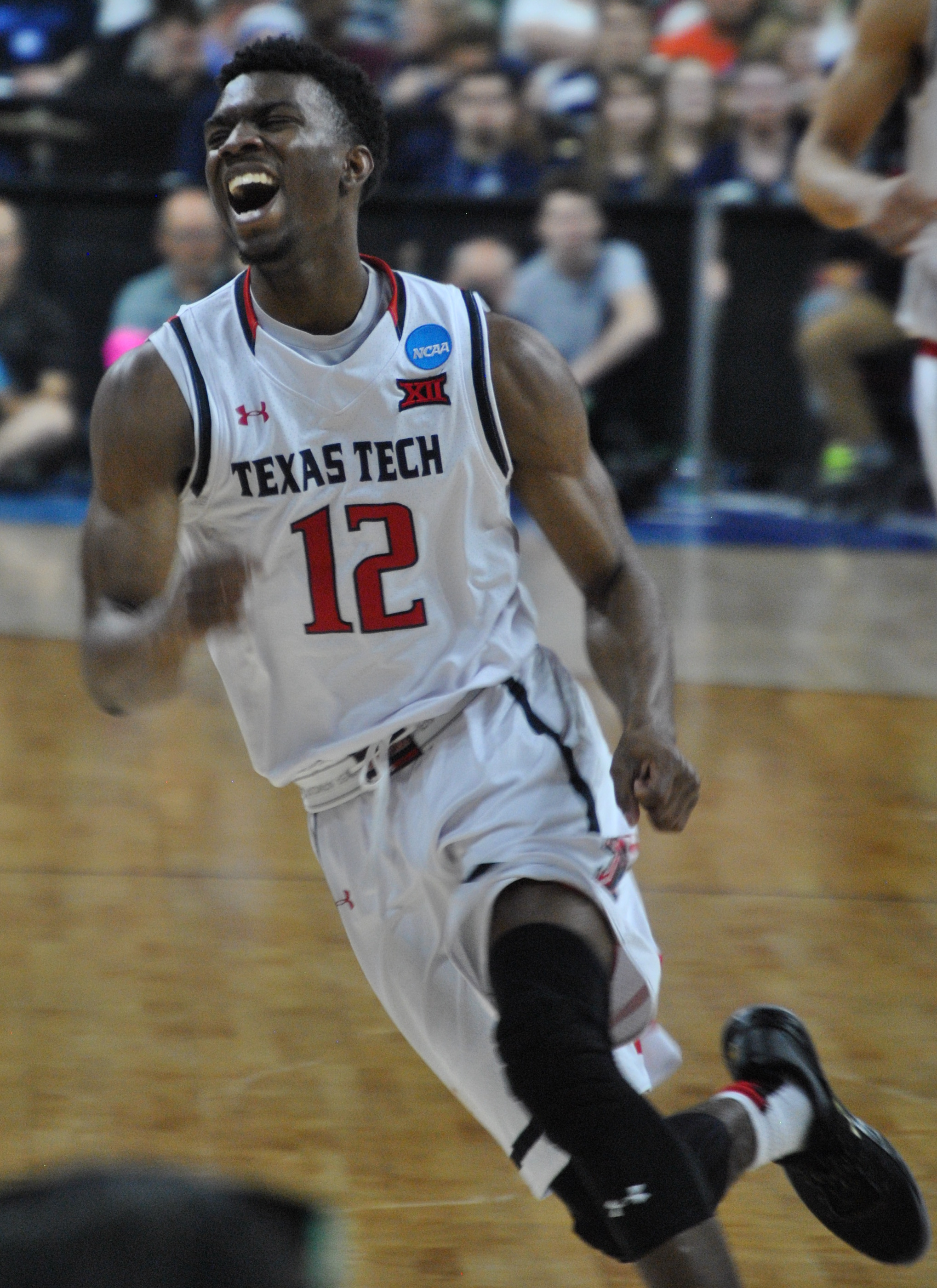
Keenan Evans

First team
Number	Player	Season
15	JT Toppin	2025-2026

Second team
Number	Player	Season
15	JT Toppin	2024-2025
23	Jarrett Culver	2018-2019
14	Andre Emmett	2003-2004

Third team
Number	Player	Season
4	Christian Anderson Jr.	2025-2026
12	Keenan Evans	2017–2018
33	Jason Sasser	1995–1996

Honorable Mention
Number	Player	Season
0	Mac McClung	2020–2021
22	Jarrius Jackson	2006–2007
22	Jarrius Jackson	2005–2006
24	Ronald Ross	2004–2005
4	Tony Battie	1996–1997
21	Cory Carr	1996–1997
33	Jason Sasser	1994–1995
44	Will Flemons	1992–1993
44	Will Flemons	1991–1992
4	Bubba Jennings	1984–1985
30	Mike Russell	1977–1978
54	Rick Bullock	1975–1976
54	Rick Bullock	1974–1975
22	Dub Malaise	1965–1966
22	Dub Malaise	1964–1965
20	Harold Hudgens	1960–1961
50	Jim Reed	1954–1955

=== Conference Player of the Year ===
Big 12 Conference
Number	Player	Seasons
15	JT Toppin	2024-2025
23	Jarrett Culver	2018–2019

Southwest Conference
Number	Player	Seasons
33	Jason Sasser	1995–1996
44	Will Flemons	1992–1993
44	Will Flemons	1991–1992
4	Bubba Jennings	1984–1985
54	Rick Bullock	1975–1976
54	Rick Bullock	1974–1975
22	Dub Malaise	1964–1965

=== All Conference first team ===
Big 12 Conference
Number	Player	Seasons
4	Christian Anderson Jr.	2025-2026
15	JT Toppin	2025-2026
15	JT Toppin	2024-2025
5	Darrion Williams	2024-2025
11	Bryson Williams	2021–2022
23	Jarrett Culver	2018–2019
12	Keenan Evans	2017–2018
22	Jarrius Jackson	2006-2007
22	Jarrius Jackson	2005–2006
24	Ronald Ross	2004–2005
14	Andre Emmett	2003–2004
14	Andre Emmett	2002–2003
14	Andre Emmett	2001–2002
21	Cory Carr	1997–1998
24	Tony Battie	1996–1997

Southwest Conference
Number	Player	Seasons
33	Jason Sasser	1995–1996
42	Mark Davis	1994–1995
33	Jason Sasser	1994–1995
33	Jason Sasser	1993–1994
44	Will Flemons	1992–1993
44	Will Flemons	1991–1992
13	Sean Gay	1988–1989
4	Bubba Jennings	1984–1985
1	Mike Russell	1977–1978
1	Mike Russell	1976–1977
54	Rick Bullock	1975–1976
1	William Johnson	1974–1975
54	Rick Bullock	1974–1975
54	Rick Bullock	1973–1974
1	Richard Little	1973–1974
1	Richard Little	1972–1973
1	Ron Richardson	1972–1973
15	Greg Lowery	1971–1972
25	Gene Knolle	1970–1971
15	Greg Lowery	1969–1970
25	Gene Knolle	1969–1970
1	Vernon Paul	1966–1967
22	Dub Malaise	1965–1966
22	Dub Malaise	1964–1965
22	Dub Malaise	1963–1964
1	Harold Denney	1964–1965
1	Harold Denney	1963–1964
22	Del Ray Mounts	1961–1962
22	Del Ray Mounts	1960–1961
1	Harold Hudgens	1961–1962
1	Harold Hudgens	1960–1961
1	Leon Hill	1958–1959
22	Gerald Myers	1957–1958

=== All tournament team ===
NCAA Tournament
Number	Player	Seasons
23	Jarrett Culver	2018–2019
13	Matt Mooney	2018–2019

Big 12 Tournament
Number	Player	Seasons
15	JT Toppin	2024–2025
1	Terrence Shannon Jr.	2021–2022
11	Bryson Williams	2021–2022
32	Mike Singletary	2008–2009
24	Ronald Ross	2004–2005
14	Andre Emmett	2002–2003

=== Ring of Honor ===
Texas Tech does not retire jersey numbers, but they do honor players with a Ring of Honor.

Texas Tech Red Raiders Ring of Honor
No.	Player	Career
14	Andre Emmett	2000–2004
33	Jason Sasser	1992-1996
4	Bubba Jennings	1980-1985
54	Rick Bullock	1972–1976
22	Dub Malaise	1963–1966
50	Jim Reed	1952–1956

=== Individual awards ===
- Chip Hilton Player of the Year Award

Ronald Ross, 2004–05

- Frances Pomeroy Naismith Award

Bubba Jennings, 1984–85

== Red Raiders playing in international leagues ==
- Adonis Arms (born1998), in the Greek Basketball League
- Jarrett Culver (born 1999), in the B.League
- Kyler Edwards (born 1999), in the Chinese Basketball Association
- Keenan Evans (born 1996), in the Lithuanian Basketball League
- Dusty Hannahs (born 1993), in the Israeli Basketball Premier League
- T. J. Holyfield (born 1995), in the Israeli Basketball Premier League
- Tariq Owens (born 1995), in the National League
- Terran Petteway (born 1992), in The League
- Robert Turner (born 1993), in the Israeli Basketball Premier League
- Bryson Williams (born 1998), in the Lega Basket Serie A
