= List of Texas Tech University faculty =

This is a partial list of notable past and present faculty members at Texas Tech University.

== Architecture ==
Name	Department	Notability	Joined TTU	Left/retired	Alumnus/na?	Refs
Dora Epstein-Jones	Architecture	Recognized for her scholarship on Architecture discipline and gender	2019	(active)	no	
Upe Flueckiger	Architecture	Internationally recognized because of the design of his house	1998	(active)	no	

== Arts and Sciences ==
Name	Department	Notability	Joined TTU	Left/retired	Alumnus/na?	Refs
Burwell B. Bell III		US Army general, former ROTC instructor at Texas Tech				
Sankar Chatterjee		Paleontologist				
Dan Flores		Historian of the American West, formerly at Texas Tech, later with the University of Montana				
Alberto Gonzales		Former United States attorney general, political science professor and diversity recruiter				
William Curry Holden		Archaeologist and historian				
Stephen Graham Jones		Blackfeet author, former associate professor at Texas Tech				
Allan J. Kuethe		Historian				
Daniel O. Nathan	Philosophy	Paradox of Intentionalism				
F. Alton Wade		Scientist, leader of the Texas Tech Shackleton Glacier Expedition and namesake of Mount Wade in Antarctica				

== Business ==
Name	Department	Notability	Joined TTU	Left/retired	Alumnus/na?	Refs
David A. Bednar	Management	Assistant professor of Management (1984–1986); president of Brigham Young University–Idaho (1997–2004)	1984	1986	no	
Kent Hance	Business Law	Professor of Business Law (1968–1973); Texas state senator (1975–1979); U.S. House representative (1979–1985); Texas Tech University System chancellor (2006–2014)	1968	1973	yes	
Shelby D. Hunt	Marketing	Highly cited marketing professor	1980	(active)	no	

== Education ==
Name	Department	Notability	Joined TTU	Left/retired	Alumnus/na?	Refs
Michael Shonrock	Educational Psychology	Educational psychologist, former Texas Tech University administrator, and Emporia State University president	1990	2011	no	

== Engineering ==
Name	Department	Notability	Joined TTU	Left/retired	Alumnus/na?	Refs
M. M. Ayoub	Ergonomics	Pioneer in the field of ergonomics	—		no	
Chau-Chyun Chen	Molecular Thermodynamics	National Academy of Engineering member	2013	(active)	no	
Fazle Hussain	Fluid Dynamics	National Academy of Engineering member	2013	(active)	no	
Magne Kristiansen	Pulsed Power	Pulsed power expert and recipient of the IEEE Third Millennium Medal	—		no	
Kishor C. Mehta	Wind Engineering	National Academy of Engineering member, former director of the Wind Science and Engineering Research Center, and developed the Enhanced Fujita Scale	1965	(active)	no	
Danny Reible	Water Resources	National Academy of Engineering member	2013	(active)	no	

== Human Sciences ==
Name	Department	Notability	Joined TTU	Left/retired	Alumnus/na?	Refs
Thomas C. Butler		Former professor, credited with making oral hydration the standard treatment for diarrhea, lost samples of the bacteria that causes bubonic plague				
Carlos Manuel Chavez		Heart surgeon				
Sonya Lutter	Financial Planning	Director of Financial Health and Wellness	2022	(active)	2010	
Gabor B. Racz		Pioneer in the treatment of chronic pain				
Tom Shires		Chair of the Surgery department (1991–1995), trauma surgeon who pioneered administering saline to shock and surgical patients				

== Media & Communication ==
Name	Department	Notability	Joined TTU	Left/retired	Alumnus/na?	Refs
Pete Brewton	Journalism		—	(active)	no	
Wyman Meinzer	Photography	State Photographer of Texas	—	—	1974	

== Visual and Performing Arts ==
Name	Department	Notability	Joined TTU	Left/retired	Alumnus/na?	Refs
Julien Paul Blitz		Cellist, conductor, and teacher; first music director of the Houston Symphony				
Mary Jeanne van Appledorn		Composer				

== Athletics ==
Name	Department	Notability	Joined TTU	Left/retired	Alumnus/na?	Refs
Rodney Allison						
Robert Anae						
Frank Anderson						
Dee Andros						
Dave Aranda						
Gary Ashby						
Art Baker						
Virgil Ballard						
Bob Bass						
Jim Bates						
Richard Bell						
Bob Beyer						
Rodney Blackshear						
Art Briles						
Alvin Brooks						
Dave Brown						
Neal Brown						
Watson Brown						
Jim Carlen						
Pete Cawthon						
Darrin Chiaverini						
Sandy Collins						
Romeo Crennel		Defensive assistant, head coach of the Cleveland Browns	1975	1977		
Sonny Cumbie						
Kristy Curry						
Kevin Curtis						
J. William Davis	Government	Father of the National Letter of Intent system, former chairman of Texas Tech's Athletic Council	1938		no	
James Dickey						
Rex Dockery						
Sonny Dykes						
Spike Dykes		Former head football coach, second all-time winningest coach in Texas Tech football history				
Rob Evans						
Beattie Feathers						
Ruben Felix						
Rockey Felker						
Ewing Y. Freeland						
Gary Gaines						
Gene Gibson						
Billy Gillispie						
Chad Glasgow						
W. L. Golightly						
John Goodner						
Cari Groce						
Al Groh						
Trey Haverty						
Larry Hays		Former head baseball coach, one of the winningest coaches in college baseball				
Ray Hayward						
Grady Higginbotham						
Dana Holgorsen						
Victor Houston						
Berl Huffman						
Bubba Jennings						
Mike Jinks						
Art Kaufman						
Joe Kerbel						
J. T. King						
Kliff Kingsbury						
Jack Kiser						
Trish Kissiar-Knight						
Wes Kittley						
Bob Knight		Former head men's basketball coach, all-time winningest NCAA D-1 men's basketball coach; Basketball Hall of Fame inductee				
Pat Knight						
Kris Kocurek						
Mike Leach		Former head football coach, all-time winningest coach in Texas Tech football history				
John Lovett						
Manny Matsakis						
Sam McElroy						
Edward McKeever						
Greg McMackin						
Ruffin McNeill						
David McWilliams						
Jack Mitchell						
Jeff Mitchell						
Jerry Moore						
Dell Morgan						
Eric Morris						
Carl Mulleneaux						
Gerald Myers						
Brian Norwood						
Bill Parcells		Assistant football coach, went on to win two Super Bowls as head coach of the New York Giants	1975	1977		
Jim Parmer						
Victor Payne						
Todd Petty						
Susan Polgar		Four-time women’s classical world chess champion and five-time Olympic chess champion				
Robert Prunty						
Richard Ritchie						
Louise Ritter						
Sam Robertson						
Travaris Robinson						
Polk Robison						
Charlie Sadler						
Doc Sadler						
Greg Sands						
John Scott, Jr.						
Kal Segrist						
Lyle Setencich						
Marsha Sharp	Women's Basketball	1993 Women's Basketball Championship coach	1982		no	
Bud Sherrod						
Tim Siegel						
Dean Slayton						
Steve Sloan						
Mike Smith						
Tubby Smith						
Dan Spencer						
Tom Stone						
Amy Suiter						
Jerry Sullivan						
Tim Tadlock						
Grant Teaff						
Chris Thomsen						
Stacey Totman						
Tommy Tuberville						
Chris Walker						
Wade Walker						
DeWitt Weaver						
James Willis						
Teresa Wilson						
Tom Wilson						
Jim Wright						
Willie Zapalac						
