= Texas Tech Red Raiders =

Athletic teams that represent Texas Tech University

Texas Tech Red Raiders and Lady Raiders
- University: Texas Tech University
- Nickname: Red Raiders
- NCAA: Division I (FBS)
- Conference: Big 12 Conference
- Athletic director: Kirby Hocutt
- Location: Lubbock, Texas, United States
- Varsity teams: 17
- Football stadium: Galaxy Stadium
- Basketball arena: United Supermarkets Arena
- Baseball stadium: Dan Law Field at Rip Griffin Park
- Soccer stadium: John Walker Soccer Complex
- Colors: Scarlet and black
- Mascot: Raider Red
- Fight song: Fight Raiders, Fight
- Website: texastech.com

Big 12 logo in Texas Tech colors

The Texas Tech Red Raiders and Lady Raiders are the athletic teams that represent Texas Tech University, located in Lubbock, Texas, United States. The women's basketball team uses the name Lady Raiders, while the school's other women's teams use the "Red Raiders" name.

The university's athletic program fields 17 varsity teams in 11 sports all of whom have combined to win 77 conference championships as well as 4 national championships. The Masked Rider and Raider Red serve as the mascots representing the teams, and the school colors are scarlet red and black. Texas Tech athletics teams compete at the National Collegiate Athletic Association (NCAA) Division I level and is a founding member of the Big 12 Conference.

From 1932 until 1956, the university belonged to the Border Intercollegiate Athletic Association. Texas Tech was admitted to the Southwest Conference on May 12, 1956. When the Southwest Conference disbanded in 1995, Texas Tech, along with the University of Texas at Austin, Texas A&M University, and Baylor University, joined with all eight former members of the Big Eight Conference to form the Big 12 Conference.

The university's athletic director is College Football Playoff committee representative Kirby Hocutt. Bob Knight, the most notorious coach in men's Division I basketball history, coached the Red Raiders men's basketball team from 2001 to 2008. Following Bob Knight's retirement in 2008, his son Pat Knight assumed head coaching duties. The Red Raiders football team, which has been coached by Mike Leach from 2000 to 2009, is a member of the NCAA Football Bowl Subdivision and has appeared in the 19th-most bowl games of any team. Tommy Tuberville was named head coach in 2010 following the firing of Mike Leach and remained in the position until 2012 before resigning. He was replaced by former Texas Tech quarterback Kliff Kingsbury in 2013. In 1993, led by coach Marsha Sharp, the Lady Raiders basketball team won the NCAA Women's Basketball Championship. Following Sharp's retirement in 2006, Kristy Curry was named Lady Raiders head coach. Red Raiders baseball coach Larry Hays, who is one of only four coaches in NCAA baseball history to win 1,500 career games, retired in 2008. In 2019, Track and Field Director Wes Kittley won the NCAA Outdoor Track and Field Championships to secure the first men's NCAA national championship in the school's history.

== History ==
On February 24, 1925, an article published in the Fort Worth Star-Telegram suggested Tech's athletic teams be called the "Dogies" explaining that "a Dogie is a calf whose mother died and is forced to look out for itself" and "If ever anything had to rustle for itself, it was West Texas and Tech College."

== Varsity sports ==
Men's sports	Women's sports
Baseball	Basketball
Basketball	Cross country
Cross country	Golf
Football	Soccer
Golf	Softball
Tennis	Tennis
Track and field^{1}	Track and field^{1}
	Volleyball
^{1} – includes both indoor and outdoor

=== Baseball ===
Behind football and men's basketball, baseball is the third oldest sport at Texas Tech. The initial team organized in 1925 and the first game, an 18–9 victory over West Texas State Teachers College, was played in 1926. In the following game, the team suffered its first ever loss, 14–9 to the team it had previously defeated. The teams' 100th game came on April 20, 1963, defeating New Mexico Highlands 10–6 in Lubbock

E. Y. Freeland was the first coach of the Red Raiders, though the team was known as the Matadors at the time. He remained in the position for three years before R. Grady Higginbotham took the role. Higginbotham coached for only two years. From 1930 to 1953, Tech did not field an intercollegiate baseball team. When the program returned in 1954, Beattie Feathers became the head coach of the Red Raiders and remained until 1960. He was followed by Berl Huffman (1961–1967), Kal Segrist (1968–1983), and Gary Ashby (1984–1986). Upon Ashby's departure, Larry Hays became the head coach of the team. On April 2, 2008, Hays became just the fourth coach in NCAA baseball history to win 1,500 career games.

Larry Hays took over the Red Raiders baseball team in 1987. Under Hays, Texas Tech endured only two losing seasons, his first and last, and enjoyed their greatest success in baseball. Hays took Tech from having a losing tradition to being a national contender. When Hays started with the Red Raiders, the team's overall record stood at 550–576. By the time he left, he was the fourth-winningest coach is college baseball history and the team's record had improved to 1,365–1,054–9. The Red Raiders reached eight straight NCAA tournaments from 1995 to 2002 and again in 2004, three of which were held at Dan Law Field. They also won two conference championships, in 1995 (while still in the Southwest Conference) and 1997, and two conference tournament championships, in 1996 and 1998.

=== Cross Country and Track & Field ===
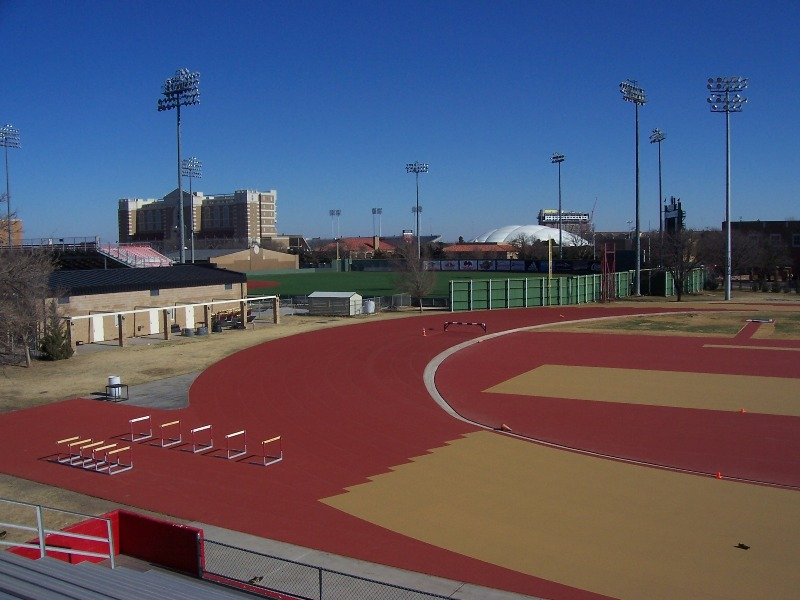
R.P. Fuller Track

Texas Tech's cross country and indoor/outdoor track & field teams are coached by Wes Kittley.

At the 2005 Outdoor National Championships, Tech qualified 31 men's and women's athletes, more than any other school in the country. Under Kittley's tutelage, Texas Tech has produced 16 national champions, seven Olympic Medalists, over 200 All-Americans and over 119 Big 12 Champions.

From 1990 to 2006, the men's team garnered 91 All-America awards, 20 Big 12 championships, and one individual national title. In the same time period, the women's team won 32 All-America awards, 29 Big 12 championships, and five individual national titles. During the 2007/08 season, the women had another strong showing behind Sally Kipyego, who won four individual national titles (cross country, indoor 3000 m and 5000 m, outdoor 10,000 m) and placed second in her bid for a fifth title in one academic year (outdoor 5000 m). Kipyego added three more national titles (cross country, indoor 5000 m, outdoor 5000 m) and one more second-place win (outdoor 1500 m) during the 2007/08 season. Under Kipyego's leadership, the women's team captured its first title in 2008. Their success was followed by another national championship appearance in 2009 and 2010.

Kennedy Kithuka followed up on the prior success of the program by winning the 2012 NCAA Cross Country Championship, being the first in the men's program to do so. For his accomplishments, Kithuka was named the 2012 National Male Athlete of the Year for cross country. In 2015 NCAA Division I Indoor Track and Field Championships, Jacorian Duffield and Bradley Adkins won 1st and 2nd place respectively in the high jump event. Other notable track and field athletes from Texas tech include Sam Hurley.

=== Football ===
The Red Raiders football team is a member of the NCAA Football Bowl Subdivision (formerly known as Division I-A). Texas Tech played its first intercollegiate football game on October 3, 1925. The contest, against McMurry University, ended in a controversial 0–0 tie. Tech's Elson Archibald seemed to have kicked a game-winning 20-yard field goal but the referee ruled that the clock had run out before the score. It was later reported that the referee made the call to get revenge because he wanted to be the team's first head coach but the job was instead given to Ewing Y. Freeland.

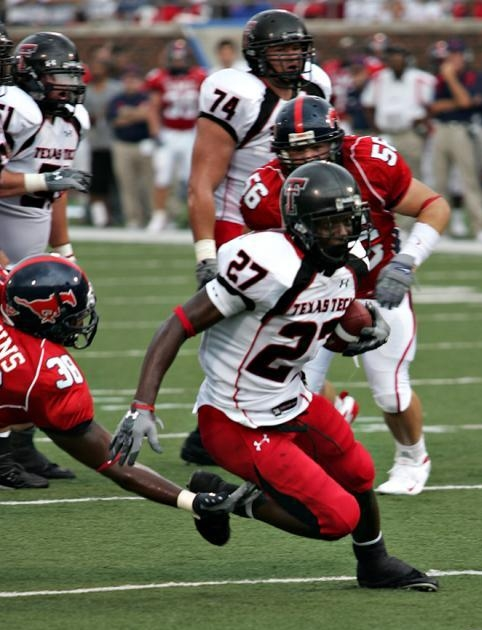
Tech in action in 2007

Through the 2019 season, the Texas Tech Red Raider football team has amassed a 571-458-32 record in 95 seasons (1925–2019).

In 1932, the program joined the Border Intercollegiate Athletic Association. Five years later, the team won its first conference championship and was invited to the Sun Bowl. The game was played on January 1, 1938, and resulted in a 6–7 loss to West Virginia. Texas Tech suffered four more bowl losses before getting their first postseason win in the 1952 Sun Bowl. Before withdrawing from the Border Intercollegiate Athletic Association in 1956, the Red Raiders won a total of eight conference championships and one co-championship, the most titles held by a Border Conference team.

In 1960, Texas Tech was admitted to the Southwest Conference (SWC). The Red Raiders won conference co-championships in 1976 and 1994. The team remained in the SWC until the conference ceased operations in 1996. Following the dissolution of the SWC, the university became a charter member of the Big 12 Conference.

In the Big 12 Conference, the Red Raiders competed in the South Division from the athletic conference's formation until the 2010 season when the divisions were eliminated.

The Red Raiders, coached by Mike Leach from 2000 to 2009, earned 56 wins from the 2000 through the 2006 season. During the same period, only three other Big 12 teams had more victories—Oklahoma, Texas, and Nebraska. In fourteen of its last fifteen seasons Tech finished with a winning record, before suffering a losing season in 2011 under then-head coach Tommy Tuberville. Tuberville resigned his position and was replaced by Kliff Kingsbury in 2013. After 6 seasons as the head football coach of his alma mater, Kingsbury was replaced by Matt Wells prior to the 2019 season, and then by Joey McGuire before the 2022 season. The Red Raiders have made 38 bowl appearances (14–23–1) which is 21st most of any university.

=== Golf ===
2007 saw the men's golf team compete in its first back-to-back National Championship tournaments since 1960. The team, coached by Greg Sands, qualified for the tournament after finishing 7th in NCAA Central Regional.

The Red Raider Men's golf team has made multiple appearances in the NCAA tournament since then. Head Coach Greg Sands has led the team to 19 consecutive NCAA regional and 10 NCAA championship berths. Sands has racked up 18 seasons as head coach of the Men's golf team at Texas Tech, in those 18 seasons Sands has led the team to 19 tournament titles and made a name for himself. The Red Raider Men's golf team is the most successful sport at Texas Tech as it has made the most appearances in the NCAA tournament.

On the other side is women's golf JoJo Robertson, has been the head coach of the Women's golf team for Texas Tech since 2009. Coach Robertson has been with the Red Raiders for 10 seasons, in those 10 seasons she has managed to reach the NCAA regional nine times, of those resulted in two trips to the NCAA championships. Robertson has led the Raiders to regional play nine of the ten seasons since she had been named the fourth head coach of the team. Under her guidance the Red Raiders have claimed 13 team titles.

=== Soccer ===
The Red Raiders played their first match against Hardin-Simmons in September 1994, defeating the Cowboys 5–0.

=== Men's basketball ===
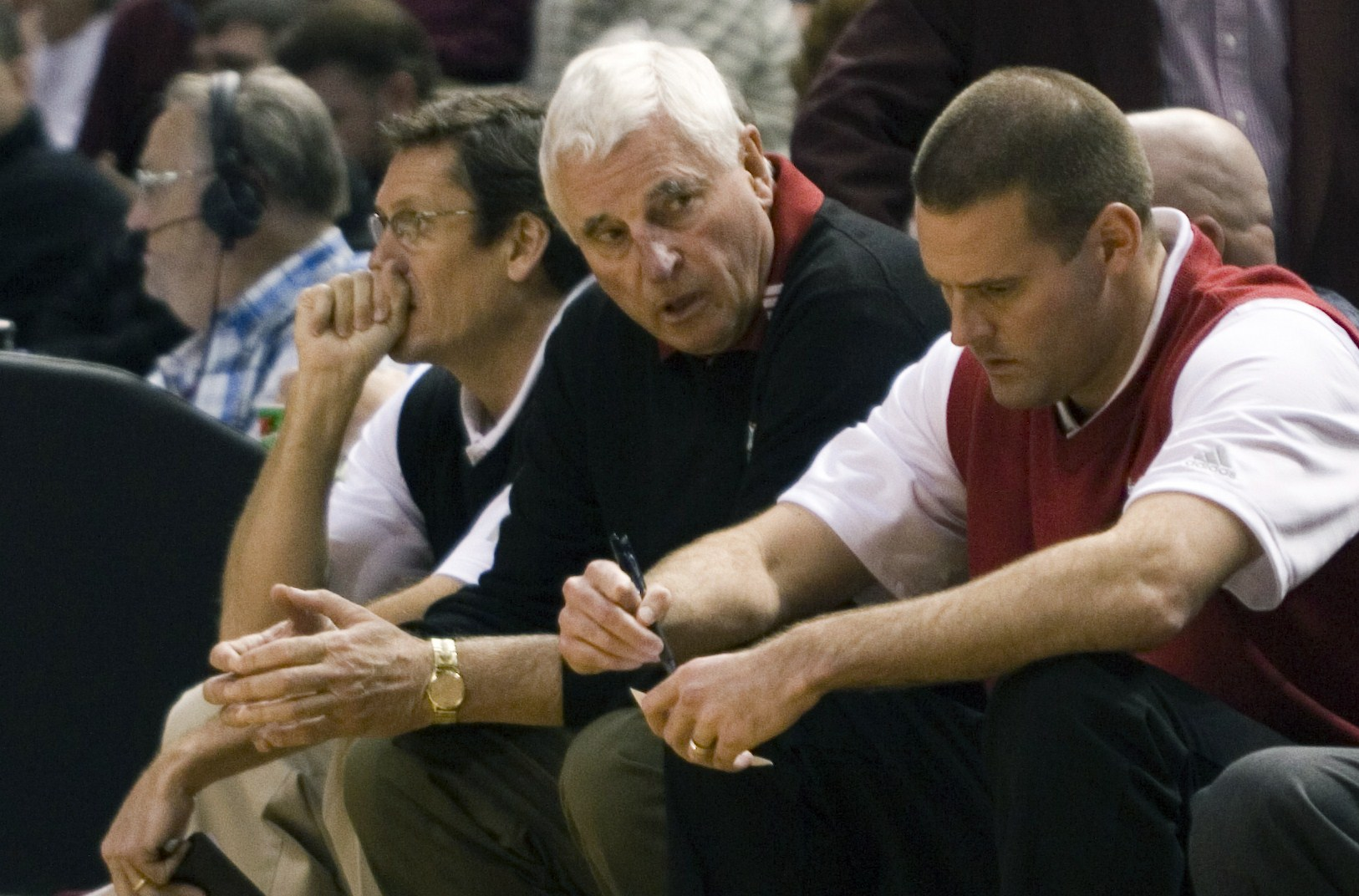
Bob Knight (middle) with Pat Knight (right)

Basketball came to Texas Tech only two years after the school was founded and the program has since won 18 conference titles, the last one being in 2019. Most of which have been won while the Red Raiders were in their Border Conference and Southwest Conference tenures, while the most recent was in the Big 12 Conference. The inaugural game was a 37–25 loss to Daniel Baker College. Tech would lose two more games before finally clinching their first ever victory—35–21 at Sul Ross University.

Grady Higginbotham was the first coach, earning a 14–18 record over two seasons. At .438, Higgenbotham was the only Tech basketball coach to garner an overall losing record during his stay. Following Higgenbotham's departure, Victor Payne led the Matadors (as the school's teams were known until 1936) from 1927 to 1930. His final tally stood at 32 wins and 20 losses. W. L. Golightly coached only one season, bringing in an 11–9 record. Dell Morgan held the head coaching job from 1931 to 1934, chalking up 42 wins to 29 losses. He was followed by Virgil Ballard. Though Ballard coached only a single season, it was during his time that the team won their milestone 100th game, a one-point victory over House of David. Ballard left with a 15–9 record.

Berl Huffman was twice the head basketball coach at Texas Tech—first from 1935 to 1942 and then from 1946 to 1947. During his total of eight seasons, he garnered a record of 121–67. Polk Robison was the only other person to serve two different times as the head basketball coach at the school. When Huffman left in 1942, Robison took the job. And, when Huffman left a second time in 1947, it was Robison who again filled the position, this time remaining until 1961. At a total of 18 seasons, his stay is the second longest of any Red Raiders basketball coach, behind Gerald Myers. He departed after leading his teams to 254 wins, 195 losses, and the first two NCAA tournaments in school history.

Gene Gibson followed Robison into the position. In his eight seasons, he chalked up the second worst record of any head basketball coach at Tech. Still, at 100–92, there were eight more wins than losses. Bob Bass led the program to a 22–15 record over a season-and-a-half before returning to professional basketball coaching duties.

Bob Knight became the men's basketball coach in 2001. He retired on February 4, 2008. On New Year's Day 2007, a 70–68 defeat of New Mexico by Tech marked the 880th total win for Knight, making him the winningest coach in men's college basketball history. Knight also has several other distinctions, including being the only coach to win the NCAA, the NIT, the Olympic Gold, and the Pan-Am Gold, and has been given several awards. Knight was succeeded by his son Pat Knight. After Pat Knight's termination, Billy Gillispie was named head coach on March 20, 2011, and subsequently resigned for health reasons after one season following while also being amidst allegations of mistreating players. Chris Walker took over on an interim basis for the 2012 season and led the red raiders to an 11–20 record.

In March 2013, Tubby Smith was named the new men's basketball coach and led the team to its first upset over a top 25 opponent since 2009. Texas Tech students broke both school and Big 12 Conference records for student attendance at the United Spirit Arena during a February 25, 2014 loss to Kansas State. The record of 6,086 students fell less than 2,000 short of the national record. The Red Raiders hired former Arkansas-Little Rock coach Chris Beard on April 15, 2016. Beard led the Red Raiders to almost immediate success, leading them to their first ever Elite Eight in 2018, and leading them to their first ever Final Four in 2019, along with a national championship berth. Beard won AP Coach of the Year in 2019.

=== Softball ===
The Red Raiders softball program began in 1981 but the program was dropped after only five seasons. When Texas Tech joined the Big 12 Conference as a charter member, the program was resurrected in time for the inaugural 1996 season. Shanon Hays, the first Lubbock Christian University head softball coach, turned the Red Raider softball team around from a 15–42 season under interim head coach Amy Suiter to 80–34 in just his first two seasons. Hays led the Red Raiders to three NCAA Regional appearances during his five seasons at the helm. Adrian Gregory was named the seventh head coach in Texas Tech history in June 2014. In 2019, the Red Raiders made their first NCAA Tournament appearance since 2012.

In the 2020s, with the legalization of direct payments to student athletes, Texas Tech softball emerged as a national power. Most notably, Tech's NIL collective, the Matador Club, spent slightly over $1 million to lure superstar pitcher NiJaree Canady from Stanford after the 2024 season. After Tech made the championship series of the 2025 Women's College World Series, losing to Texas, Canady signed a second million-dollar deal with the Matador Club to stay at Tech for 2026. The Red Raiders again reached the WCWS championship series, again losing to Texas.

=== Tennis ===
The men's tennis team had a very successful 2008 season being ranked as high as #17 in the nation. The Red Raiders faced 11 ranked teams and have only lost to two, #31 TCU and #11 Tulsa. Texas Tech ended the regular season ranked #17. Recently, the Red Raiders 2012 season resulted in a closing ITA ranking of 19.

The Texas Tech tennis team won the Border Conference tennis championship in 1936, 1937, and 1950. The woman's team, led by Todd Petty, won the Big 12 Conference in 2012.

=== Women's basketball ===
Of the varsity sports, Texas Tech has had its greatest success in women's basketball with 13 conference titles and 1 national championship. Led by its star player Sheryl Swoopes and head coach Marsha Sharp, the Lady Raiders won the NCAA Women's Basketball Championship in 1993. In early 2006, Lady Raiders coach Marsha Sharp retired and was replaced on March 30, 2006, by Kristy Curry, who had been the coach at Purdue. Curry accepted the same position at The University of Alabama on May 11, 2013, and was replaced by Candace Whitaker, a former player for Texas Tech in the 1990s, who was named head coach on May 22, 2013. Marlene Stollings, former head coach at the University of Minnesota, was named head coach at Texas Tech in 2018. On August 6, 2020, Stollings was fired after allegations of abuse. 12 days later, UT-Arlington coach and former Lady Raider Krista Gerlich was hired as the new coach.

=== Volleyball ===
The Texas Tech volleyball program began in 1974 with a 18–10 record under head coach Jeannine McHaney. The Red Raiders are currently coached by Tony Graystone, who joined the team in 2016.

== Club sports ==
In addition to varsity sports, the university's Sport Clubs Federation offers 30 recreational and competitive sport clubs, including polo, rugby union, lacrosse, fencing, soccer, and esports.

=== Ice hockey ===
The Texas Tech Ice Hockey Team was established in 1999. As a member of the American Collegiate Hockey Association, the Red Raiders compete with Big XII Conference Teams as well as with colleges throughout the United States and Canada. Players are recruited from the United States, Canada, and abroad.

=== Polo ===
Of the clubs sports, Texas Tech's Polo Club team, coached by Clyde Waddell, has had the greatest success. In spite of having no previous experience, at the invitation of students, Waddell took the job in 2000. Six years later, the team beat in-state rival Texas A&M to win the United States Polo Association National Intercollegiate Championship.

=== Rodeo ===
Texas Tech's rodeo club team competes in the National Intercollegiate Rodeo Association and won the 1955 championship at the College National Finals Rodeo.

=== Men’s Soccer ===
Texas Tech Men's soccer competes in the NIRSA championship series. They won the 2022 southern regional tournament with a 1–0 win against the University of Missouri, and were defeated in extra time by Michigan State University in the sweet 16 of the national tournament.

=== Rugby ===
Texas Tech rugby plays in Division 1-A in the Allied Rugby Conference, a conference composed primarily of schools from the Big 12 South, against its traditional rivals such as Texas and Texas A&M. For the 2011–12 year, Texas Tech had also fielded a side to play in Division 2, where they won the Texas championship and qualified for the national playoffs.

== Facilities ==
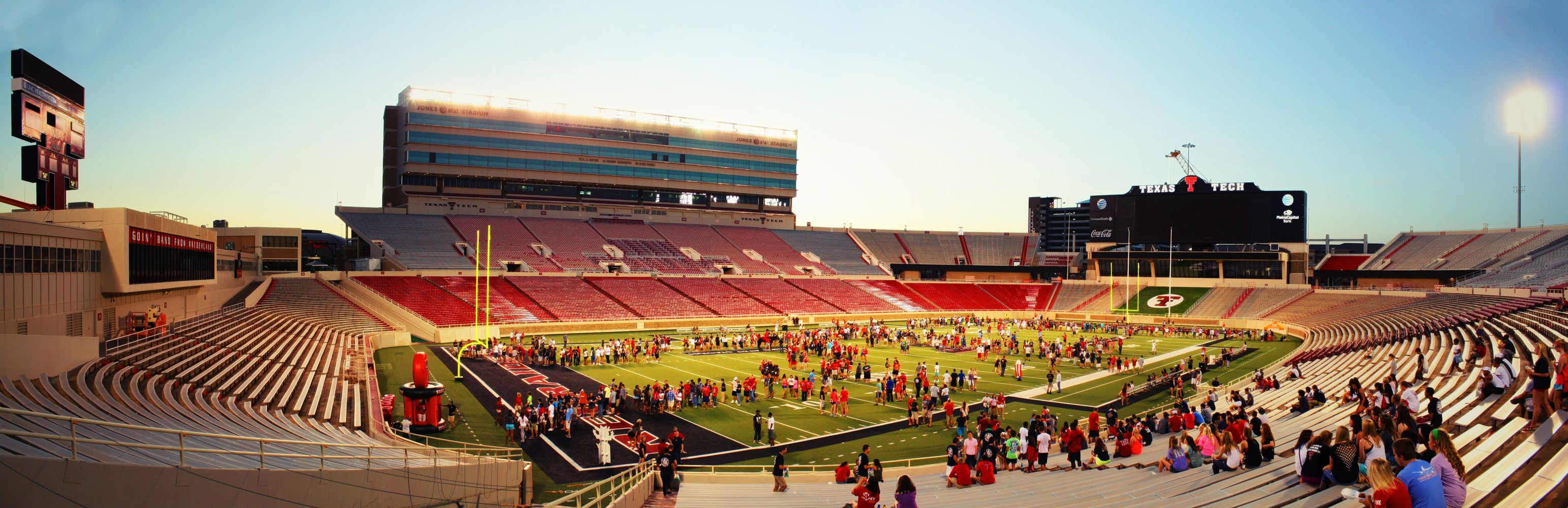
Galaxy Stadium

Galaxy Stadium serves as home to the Red Raiders football team. The stadium, named for Clifford B. and Audrey Jones, opened in 1947. In 2000, the stadium was renamed Jones SBC Stadium after SBC Communications made a $30 million contribution to the university. Following SBC Communications' acquisition of AT&T Corporation in 2006, the stadium was renamed Jones AT&T Stadium. The stadium's original seating capacity was 27,000, but it was expanded in 1959, 1972, 2003, 2005, 2009, 2010, 2013, and 2024 to the current capacity of 60,229. Overall, from 1999 to 2009 the school spent more than $84 million for ongoing renovation and expansion to the stadium and the football program.

In January 2013, construction began adding another 368 seats in the north endzone, in addition to an observation deck that will hold 40. The $11 million project also includes a significantly upgraded jumbotron with a new sound system, a Spanish Renaissance-themed colonnade, and a new north end zone concourse connecting the two stadium halves. Along with the other additions, 157 feet of ribbon board will be added on the north end zone, more than 160 linear feet in the northeast and northwest corners of the stadium, and 94 linear feet in the south end zone over the athletic offices. All of the new features of Jones AT&T Stadium were unveiled on September 7, 2013 . On July 17, 2026, the name was changed to Galaxy Stadium after a new 15-year deal was signed with Galaxy Digital, a tech infrastructure company whose Helios Data Center is located in Dickens County.

Since 1999, home basketball games have been played at United Supermarkets Arena (originally United Spirit Arena), a 15,020-seat multi-purpose facility which cost $62 million to build. In addition to serving as home to the men's and women's basketball teams, the arena is used by the Red Raiders volleyball team.

- Baseball – Dan Law Field at Rip Griffin Park
- Basketball – United Supermarkets Arena
- Equestrian – Texas Tech Equestrian Center
- Football – Galaxy Stadium
- Golf – The Rawls Course
- Rodeo – Texas Tech Equestrian Center/Dub Parks Memorial Arena
- Soccer – John Walker Soccer Complex
- Softball – Rocky Johnson Field
- Tennis – Don & Ethel McLeod Tennis Center
- Track and Field, Indoor – Athletic Training Center
- Track and Field, Outdoor – R.P. Fuller Track
- Volleyball – United Supermarkets Arena

== Championships ==
=== NCAA team championships ===
Texas Tech has won 3 NCAA team national championships.

- Men's (2)
  - Indoor Track and Field (1): 2024
  - Outdoor Track and Field (1): 2019
- Women's (1)
  - Basketball (1): 1993
- see also:
  - Big 12 Conference national team titles
  - List of NCAA schools with the most NCAA Division I championships

=== Other national team championships ===
National team titles that are not bestowed by the NCAA:

Texas Tech Spirit Squad (10):

- Texas Tech Pom Squad & Coed Cheer won NCA National Titles in 2017, 2019, 2024 & 2025.
- Texas Tech Pom Squad (Dance Team) has won 6 National Titles three in Jazz, and three in Pom.

- Men's:
  - Australian rules football (2): 2014, 2015
  - Polo (Note: Not a National Collegiate Athletic Association sanctioned sport, but competes at the varsity level) USPA National Intercollegiate Championship: 2006
  - Rodeo NIRA College National Finals Rodeo: 1955
- Women's:
  - Rodeo NIRA College National Finals Rodeo: 2012

=== Conference championships ===
Texas Tech has won 79 conference championships: 30 Big 12 Conference titles, 27 Southwest Conference (SWC) titles, and 22 Border Conference titles.

Texas Tech has also won one division championship in football winning in 2008 in a three-way tie with Oklahoma and Texas

=== Baseball (7) ===
Sport	Association	Division	Year	Type	Opponent/Runner Up	Score
Baseball (7)	NCAA					
Baseball (7)	NCAA		1995	SWC Regular Season	Rice University	N/A
Baseball (7)	NCAA		1995	SWC Tournament	Texas A&M University	8-6
Baseball (7)	NCAA		1997	Big 12 Regular Season	Oklahoma State	N/A
Baseball (7)	NCAA		1998	Big 12 Tournament	Texas A&M University	14-7
Baseball (7)	NCAA		2016	Big 12 Regular Season	Oklahoma State University	N/A
Baseball (7)	NCAA		2017	Big 12 Regular Season	Texas Christian University	N/A
Baseball (7)	NCAA		2019	Big 12 Regular Season	Baylor University	N/A

=== Men’s Basketball (19) ===
Sport	Association	Division	Year	Type	Opponent/Runner Up	Score
Men’s Basketball (19)	NCAA					
Men’s Basketball (19)	NCAA		1933	Border Conference Regular Season	N/A	N/A
Men’s Basketball (19)	NCAA		1934	Border Conference Regular Season	N/A	N/A
Men’s Basketball (19)	NCAA		1935	Border Conference Regular Season	N/A	N/A
Men’s Basketball (19)	NCAA		1954	Border Conference Regular Season	N/A	N/A
Men’s Basketball (19)	NCAA		1955	Border Conference Regular Season	N/A	N/A
Men’s Basketball (19)	NCAA		1956	Border Conference Regular Season	N/A	N/A
Men’s Basketball (19)	NCAA		1961	SWC Regular Season	Texas A&M University	N/A
Men’s Basketball (19)	NCAA		1962	SWC Regular Season	Southern Methodist University	N/A
Men’s Basketball (19)	NCAA		1965	SWC Regular Season	Southern Methodist University	N/A
Men’s Basketball (19)	NCAA		1973	SWC Regular Season	Texas A&M University	N/A
Men’s Basketball (19)	NCAA		1976	SWC men's tournament	Texas A&M University	74-72
Men’s Basketball (19)	NCAA		1985	SWC Regular Season	Southern Methodist University	N/A
Men’s Basketball (19)	NCAA		1985	SWC men's tournament	Arkansas	67-64
Men’s Basketball (19)	NCAA		1986	SWC men's tournament	Texas A&M University	67-63
Men’s Basketball (19)	NCAA		1993	SWC men's tournament	Houston	88-76
Men’s Basketball (19)	NCAA		1995	SWC Regular Season	Tied 1st with Texas	N/A
Men’s Basketball (19)	NCAA		1996	SWC Regular Season	Houston	N/A
Men’s Basketball (19)	NCAA		1996	SWC men's tournament	Texas	75-73
Men’s Basketball (19)	NCAA		2019	Big 12 Regular Season	Tied 1st with Kansas State	N/A

=== Women’s Basketball (13) ===
Sport	Association	Division	Year	Type	Opponent/Runner Up	Score
Women’s Basketball (13)	NCAA					
Women’s Basketball (13)	NCAA		1992	SWC Regular Season	Texas	N/A
Women’s Basketball (13)	NCAA		1992	SWC women's tournament	Texas	76-74
Women’s Basketball (13)	NCAA		1993	SWC Regular Season	Tied 1st with Texas	N/A
Women’s Basketball (13)	NCAA		1993	SWC women's tournament	Texas	78-71
Women’s Basketball (13)	NCAA		1994	SWC Regular Season	Texas A&M	N/A
Women’s Basketball (13)	NCAA		1995	SWC Regular Season	Southern Methodist University	N/A
Women’s Basketball (13)	NCAA		1995	SWC women's tournament	Southern Methodist University	84-62
Women’s Basketball (13)	NCAA		1996	SWC Regular Season	Tied 1st with Texas	N/A
Women’s Basketball (13)	NCAA		1998	Big 12 Regular Season	Iowa State	N/A
Women’s Basketball (13)	NCAA		1998	Big 12 women's tournament	Kansas	71-53
Women’s Basketball (13)	NCAA		1999	Big 12 Regular Season	Iowa State	N/A
Women’s Basketball (13)	NCAA		1999	Big 12 women's tournament	Iowa State	73-59
Women’s Basketball (13)	NCAA		2000	Big 12 Regular Season	Tied 1st with Iowa State and Oklahoma	N/A

=== Football (12) ===
Sport	Association	Division	Year	Type	Opponent/Runner Up	Score
Football (12)	NCAA					
Football (12)	NCAA		1937	Border Conference Regular Season	N/A	N/A
Football (12)	NCAA		1942	Border Conference Regular Season	N/A	N/A
Football (12)	NCAA		1947	Border Conference Regular Season	N/A	N/A
Football (12)	NCAA		1948	Border Conference Regular Season	N/A	N/A
Football (12)	NCAA		1949	Border Conference Regular Season	N/A	N/A
Football (12)	NCAA		1951	Border Conference Regular Season	N/A	N/A
Football (12)	NCAA		1953	Border Conference Regular Season	N/A	N/A
Football (12)	NCAA		1954	Border Conference Regular Season	N/A	N/A
Football (12)	NCAA		1955	Border Conference Regular Season	N/A	N/A
Football (12)	NCAA		1976	SWC Regular Season	Tied 1st with Houston	N/A
Football (12)	NCAA		1994	SWC Regular Season	Tied 1st with Texas, Baylor, TCU and Rice	N/A
Football (12)	NCAA		2025	Big 12 Championship Game	BYU	34–7

=== Football (Division) (1) ===
Sport	Association	Division	Year	Type	Opponent/Runner Up	Score
Football (1)	NCAA					
Football (1)	NCAA		2008	Big 12 South Division	Tied 1st with Oklahoma and Texas	N/A

=== Women's Cross Country (3) ===
Sport	Association	Division	Year	Type	Opponent/Runner Up	Score
Cross Country (3)	NCAA					
Cross Country (3)	NCAA		2008	Big 12 Conference Cross Country Championship	Baylor	44-71
Cross Country (3)	NCAA		2009	Big 12 Conference Cross Country Championship	Colorado	38-52
Cross Country (3)	NCAA		2010	Big 12 Conference Cross Country Championship	Colorado	44-53

=== Men's Golf (7) ===
Sport	Association	Division	Year	Type	Opponent/Runner Up	Score
Men's Golf (7)	NCAA					
Men's Golf (7)	NCAA		1936	Border Conference	N/A	N/A
Men's Golf (7)	NCAA		1937	Border Conference	N/A	N/A
Men's Golf (7)	NCAA		1939	Border Conference	N/A	N/A
Men's Golf (7)	NCAA		1955	Border Conference	N/A	N/A
Men's Golf (7)	NCAA		1959	SWC Conference	N/A	N/A
Men's Golf (7)	NCAA		1971	SWC Conference	N/A	N/A
Men's Golf (7)	NCAA		1996	SWC Conference	N/A	N/A

=== Men's Track and Field (9) ===
Sport	Association	Division	Year	Type	Opponent/Runner Up	Score
Men's Track and Field (9)	NCAA					
Men's Track and Field (9)	NCAA		2005	Big 12 Outdoor Championship	Texas	149.50-100.50
Men's Track and Field (9)	NCAA		2014	Big 12 Outdoor Championship	Texas	160.5-125
Men's Track and Field (9)	NCAA		2018	Big 12 Indoor Championship	Texas	143-129
Men's Track and Field (9)	NCAA		2018	Big 12 Outdoor Championship	Texas	165-117
Men's Track and Field (9)	NCAA		2019	Big 12 Indoor Championship	Iowa State	179-109
Men's Track and Field (9)	NCAA		2019	Big 12 Outdoor Championship	Texas	164-120.50
Men's Track and Field (9)	NCAA		2023	Big 12 Indoor Championship	Oklahoma State	159-111
Men's Track and Field (9)	NCAA		2023	Big 12 Outdoor Championship	Texas	179-125.50
Men's Track and Field (9)	NCAA		2024	Big 12 Indoor Championship	Oklahoma State	152-92

=== Women's Soccer (2) ===
Sport	Association	Division	Year	Type	Opponent/Runner Up	Score
Women's Soccer (2)	NCAA					
Women's Soccer (2)	NCAA		2015	Big 12 Conference Women's Soccer Tournament	Kansas	1-0
Women's Soccer (2)	NCAA		2023	Big 12 Regular Season	BYU	N/A

=== Softball (2) ===
Sport	Association	Division	Year	Type	Opponent/Runner Up	Score
Women's Softball (2)	NCAA					
Women's Softball (2)	NCAA		2025	Big 12 Conference Softball Tournament	Arizona	4-0
Women's Softball (2)	NCAA		2025	Big 12 Regular Season	Arizona	N/A

=== Men's Tennis (4) ===
Sport	Association	Division	Year	Type	Opponent/Runner Up	Score
Men's Tennis (4)	NCAA					
Men's Tennis (4)	NCAA		1936	Border Conference	N/A	N/A
Men's Tennis (4)	NCAA		1937	Border Conference	N/A	N/A
Men's Tennis (4)	NCAA		1950	Border Conference	N/A	N/A
Men's Tennis (4)	NCAA		2016	Big 12 Regular Season	Tied for 1st with TCU	N/A

=== Women's Tennis (5) ===
Sport	Association	Division	Year	Type	Opponent/Runner Up	Score
Women's Tennis (5)	NCAA					
Women's Tennis (5)	NCAA		2012	Big 12 Regular Season	Baylor	N/A
Women's Tennis (5)	NCAA		2013	Big 12 Regular Season	Tied 1st with Baylor	N/A
Women's Tennis (5)	NCAA		2017	Big 12 Regular Season	Tied 1st with Oklahoma State	N/A
Women's Tennis (5)	NCAA		2017	Big 12 Women's Tennis Championship	Oklahoma State	4–2
Women's Tennis (5)	NCAA		2025	Big 12 Regular Season	Tied 1st with Oklahoma State and UCF	N/A

== Culture ==
=== Nickname ===
The Red Raiders from Texas Tech, terror of the southwest this year, swooped into the New Mexico University camp today and wrested away a 39–6 football victory before the eyes of a homecoming crowd of 9,000.

— Collier Parris of the Lubbock Avalanche-Journal

The Red Raiders were originally known as the "Matadors" from 1925 to 1936. As the school was thinking of an appropriate nickname for its athletic teams in 1925, the wife of the first football coach suggested "Matadors" to reflect the influence of the campus' Spanish Renaissance architecture. The students followed the suggestion, and later chose red and black as the school colors to represent a matador's traditional garb. Coincidentally, the football team won its first game right after it had adopted the name. The nickname and school colors became official during a formal convocation on March 15, 1926.

There are two main stories as to how the name "Red Raiders" replaced its predecessor. In one story, football coach Pete Cawthon ordered attractive scarlet uniforms to help the team's identity. The football team, wearing its new outfit, defeated heavily favored Loyola in Los Angeles on October 26, 1934. A Los Angeles sports writer called the Matadors a "red raiding team". Other writers who covered Tech sports caught on with the term and successfully promoted the use of "Red Raiders". In the other tale, former Lubbock Avalanche-Journal sports columnist Collier Parris, reporting on a 1932 Tech football game, wrote: "The Red Raiders from Texas Tech, terror of the Southwest this year, swooped into the New Mexico University camp today." The name soon became popular afterward and by 1936, it officially replaced "Matadors" at the same time the Saddle Tramps came about.

=== Spirit ===
Red Raider spirit is led by such organizations as the Saddle Tramps, the High Riders, and the spirit squads (consisting of the cheer squad and the pom squad). In April 2010, the Texas Tech cheer squad finished third at the National Cheerleaders Association and National Dance Association.

=== Mascots ===
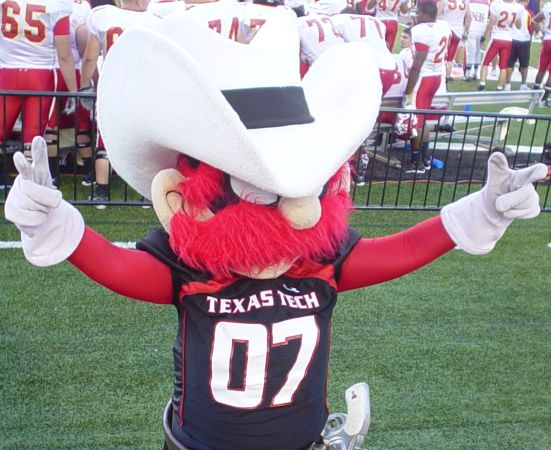
Raider Red displaying the Guns up hand gesture

The Masked Rider is Texas Tech University's oldest mascot. The tradition began in 1936, when "ghost riders" circled the field prior to home football games. The Masked Rider became an official mascot in 1954, when Joe Kirk Fulton led the team onto the field at the Gator Bowl. According to reports from those present at the game, the crowd sat in stunned silence as they watched Fulton and his horse, Blackie, rush onto the football field, followed by the team. After a few moments, the silent crowd burst into cheers. Ed Danforth, a writer for the Atlanta Journal who witnessed the event, later wrote, "No team in any bowl game ever made a more sensational entrance."

In 2000, The Masked Rider tradition was commemorated with the unveiling of a statue outside of the university's Frazier Alumni Pavilion. The sculpture, created by artist Grant Speed, is 25 percent larger than life. Today the Masked Rider, with guns up, leads the team onto the field for all home games. This mascot, adorned in a distinctive gaucho hat like the ones worn by members of the marching band, is one of the most visible figures at Texas Tech. Ashley Wenzel, a sophomore education major from Friendswood, Texas, will represent the university as the Masked Rider during 2012–13.

Texas Tech's other mascot, Raider Red, is a more recent creation. Beginning with the 1971 football season, the Southwest Conference forbade the inclusion of live animal mascots to away games unless the host school consented. For situations where the host school did not want to allow the Masked Rider's horse, an alternate mascot was needed. Jim Gaspard, a member of the Saddle Tramps student spirit organization, created the original design for the Raider Red costume, basing it on a character created by cartoonist Dirk West, a Texas Tech alumnus and former Lubbock mayor. Though the Masked Rider's identity is public knowledge, it has always been tradition that Raider Red's student alter ego is kept secret until the end of their tenure. The student serving as Raider Red is a member of the Saddle Tramps or High Riders.

=== Rivalries ===
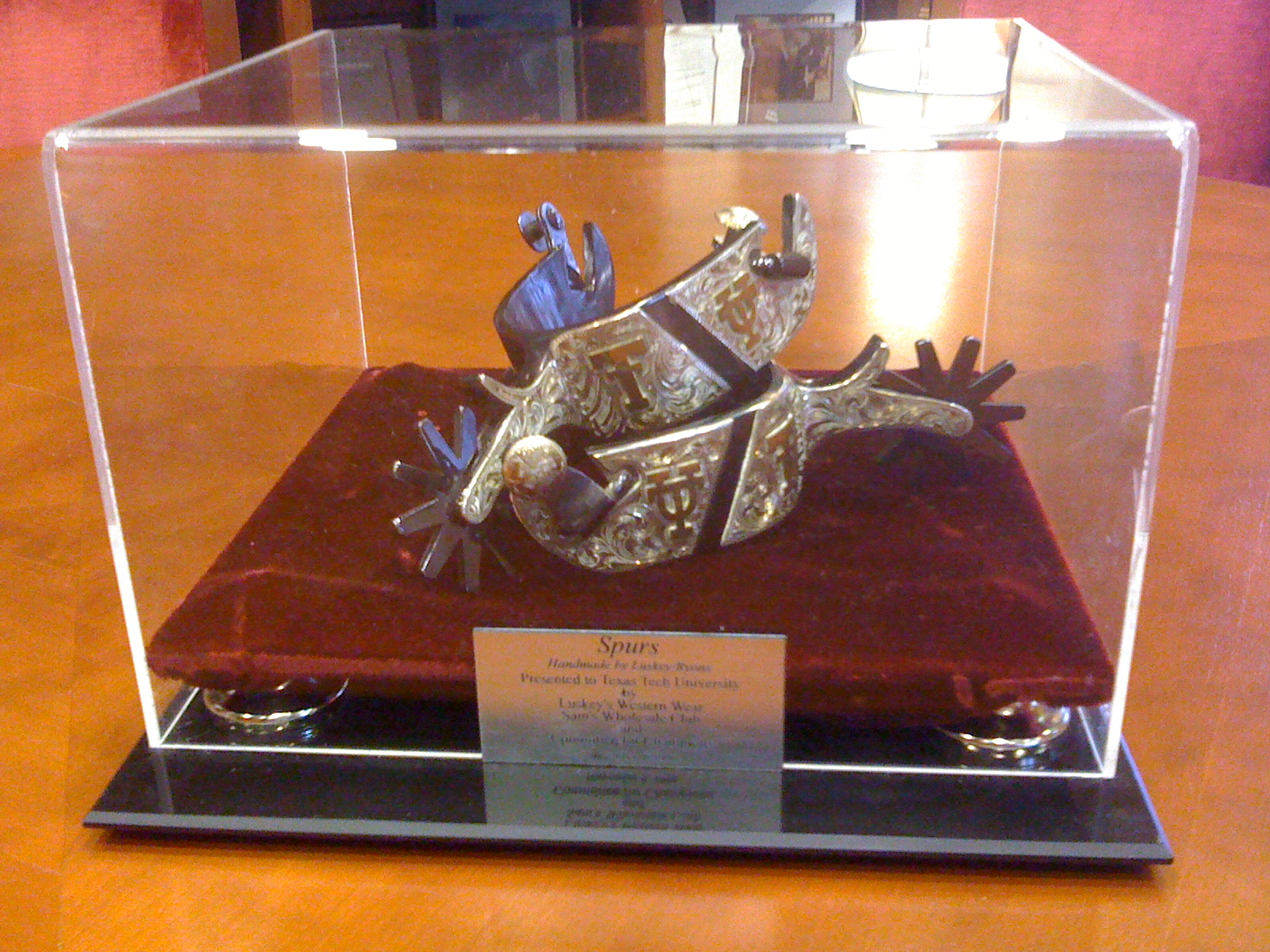
Since 1996, a traveling trophy called the Chancellor's Spurs is exchanged between the winner of the annual Longhorn–Red Raider football game.

Texas Tech's main athletic rivals are the Texas Longhorns and Texas A&M Aggies. It is common for people to camp out in front of Jones AT&T Stadium a few days prior to home football games against the Aggies, the Longhorns, and the Oklahoma Sooners.

In March 2009, Texas Tech and Baylor reached an agreement to move their next two football games to the Dallas metropolitan area. The schools played November 28, 2009, at Cowboys Stadium in Arlington with Tech claiming the victory. The next game was scheduled for October 9, 2010, at the Cotton Bowl Stadium during the State Fair of Texas, with Tech emerging victorious again. The arrangement was extended for an additional two years.

In sports other than football, Eastern New Mexico University are seen as a regional rival due to the close proximity of the two schools and frequency of match-ups between them. An example of this is Eastern New Mexico University's yearly attendance at the Texas Tech Open; an annual track and field event hosted by Texas Tech.

== People ==
=== Athletic directors ===
- E. Y. Freeland, 1925–1927
- Grady Higgenbotham, 1927–1929
- Pete Cawthon, 1930–1940
- Morley Jennings, 1941–1951
- DeWitt Weaver, 1952–1960
- Polk Robison, 1960–1970
- J. T. King, 1970–1978
- Dick Tamburo, 1978–1980
- John Conley, 1980–1985
- James "T" Jones, 1985–1993
- Bob Bockrath, 1993–1996
- Gerald Myers, 1996–2011
- Kirby Hocutt, 2011–present

=== Head coaches ===
Head coaches of Texas Tech teams include:

- Baseball – Tim Tadlock
- Basketball, Men's – Grant McCasland
- Basketball, Women's – Krista Gerlich
- Cross Country – Jon Murray
- Football – Joey McGuire
- Golf, Men's – Greg Sands
- Golf, Women's – JoJo Robertson
- Soccer – Tom Stone
- Softball – Gerry Glasco
- Tennis, Men's – Daniel Whitehead
- Tennis, Women's – Todd Petty
- Indoor/Outdoor Track & Field – Wes Kittley
- Volleyball – Tony Graystone

=== Alumni ===
Texas Tech Red Raiders alumni have gone on to play in the NFL, NBA, WNBA, Major League Baseball, and more. Current alumni standouts include Super Bowl Champion Patrick Mahomes of the Kansas City Chiefs, Wes Welker of the Denver Broncos, Super Bowl Champion Danny Amendola of the New England Patriots, and Michael Crabtree of the Oakland Raiders. Mahomes is widely viewed as the greatest of all Raider Alumni following his Super Bowl LIV and Super Bowl LVII wins and being named Super Bowl MVP in both games.
