= Kennedy Kithuka =

Kenyan long-distance runner

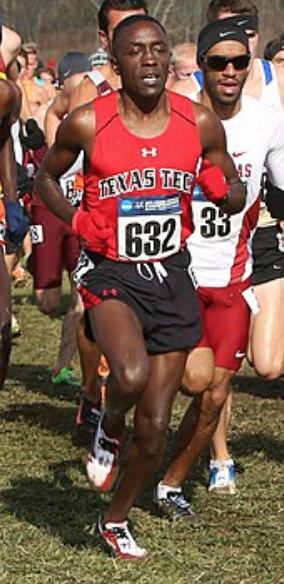

Personal information
- Nationality: Kenyan
- Born: June 4, 1989 (age 37) Thika, Kenya

Sport
- Sport: Cross country running, Track and Field
- University team: Texas Tech
- Club: Skechers performance Elite team
- Coached by: Wes Kittley

Achievements and titles
- National finals: NCAA Men's Cross Country Championship (2012)
- Updated on 4 / 2016

Kennedy Kithuka (born June 4, 1989) is a Kenyan former cross country and track runner for Texas Tech under head coach Wes Kittley.

== Career ==
=== High school ===
In 2007, Kennedy Kithuka ran
9:00 3000 metres
4:20 1500 metres
15:10 5000 metres
30:20 10,000 metres

=== 2010 ===
Kithuka won NAIA Outdoor Track & Field Championships titles for Wayland Baptist University in the 10 km in 29:31.99 and 5 km in 13:56.82. Kithuka also took titles in the Sooner Athletic Conference Championships 3 km Steeplechase and 5 km.

Kithuka competed for Wayland Baptist University in National Association of Intercollegiate Athletics Outdoor Track and Field Championships while winning the 3 km in 8:08.53, was runner-up in the mile in 4:08.89, 4th place in the DMR in 10:03.29.

=== 2011 ===
Kithuka finished the NAIA national men's outdoor track and field championship for Wayland Baptist University with 8th place in the 10 km in 30:29.69, and 3rd place in the 5 km in 14:17.20.

Kithuka's indoor season was highlighted with NAIA National Men's Indoor Track And Field Championship 5th-place finish in the 5 km in 14:30.95 and 10th-place finish in the DMR in 10:13.95.

=== 2012 ===
Kithuka won the 2012 NAIA Outdoor Track & Field Championships 10 km in 29:35.85, 5 km in 14:04.72, and finished 2nd in the 1500 m in 3:46.72. He notched a personal record at the Mt SAC Relays in 28:18.97 where he was the runner-up and World Standard time in the 5k in 13:28.61.

Kithuka's indoor season was capped off with NAIA Indoor Championships titles in the 3000 meters in 8:03.63, DMR in 9:51.31, while finishing 5th in the mile in 4:08.23.

In 2012, Kithuka won the individual Big 12 champion, the NCAA Men's Cross Country Championship, and was named the National Male Athlete of the Year for cross country.

=== 2013 ===
During the indoor, Kithuka won the Big 12 Conference 3,000 meters (7:53.72) and 5,000 meters (13:41.01) and NCAA Track and Field 5,000 meters championships (13:25.38).

In 2013, Kithuka went undefeated and won the individual Big 12 Conference 8k Championship for a second time and only losing to Edward Cheserek of University of Oregon at the NCAA Men's Division I Cross Country Championship.

=== 2014 ===
In 2014, Kithuka set personal best in both events:

5000 Metres	13:26.98	Walnut, CA	18 APR 2014
10,000 Metres	27:41.73	Palo Alto, CA	04 MAY 2014

Kithuka would win the Big 12 Conference titles for both the 10k and 5k run. His track record performance during his 5k clinched the team Big 12 Conference title for Texas Tech. Kithuka also lead the 10 km and 5 km at NCAA Outdoor Track and Field Championships and earned All-American in both events (8th - 13:34.91) & (4th - 28:46.21). Kennedy plans to finish his degree and remain in Lubbock, Texas training under his coach John Murray.

=== Coaching in 2014 & 2015 ===
Kennedy Kithuka served as volunteer assistant coach at Texas Tech; and guided men to (7th B12 and 14th NCAA Mtn) and women to (9th B12 and 12th NCAA Mtn) in 2014–15 as a 1st year assistant.

=== 2016 ===
Kennedy Kithuka is a part of Skechers performance Elite team. Kennedy is in the elite road -race April 3 at Carlsbad 5000 where Kithuka placed 12th in 14:12. Kithuka ran 14:26 at Boston Athletic Association 5 km on April 16 in Boston, Massachusetts.
