= 1981 NAIA World Series =

1981 NAIA baseball tournament
- 1981 NAIA World Series
- Teams: 10
- Format: Double elimination
- Finals site: Chaparral Stadium; Lubbock, Texas
- Champions: Grand Canyon (2nd title)
- Winning coach: Gil Stafford (Grand Canyon title)
- MVP: Pete Bethea (Grand Canyon)

The 1981 NAIA World Series was a double-elimination tournament to determine the baseball champion of the National Association of Intercollegiate Athletics (NAIA). The tournament was held at Chaparral Stadium (Note: Hays Field was named Chaparral Stadium 1978–1999.) on the campus of Lubbock Christian College (Note: Lubbock Christian University was named Lubbock Christian College 1956–1988.) in Lubbock, Texas, from June 2 through June 8. The Grand Canyon Antelopes won the tournament, the team's second consecutive NAIA baseball championship.

== Participants ==
1981 NAIA World Series participants
Team	Record	Head coach	Previous appearances
Azusa Pacific		Tom Hicks	None
Grand Canyon		Gil Stafford	4 (1969, 1971, 1973, 1980)
John Brown			None
Lipscomb		Ken Dugan	7 (1971, 1972, 1974, 1977, 1978, 1979, 1980)
Liberty		Al Worthington	None
Lubbock Christian	38–38	Larry Hays	2 (1977, 1980)
Southeastern Oklahoma State		Mike Metheny	3 (1978, 1979, 1980)
Spring Arbor		Hank Burbridge	None
William Jewell		Fred Flook	7 (1957, 1967, 1968, 1970, 1976, 1977, 1980)
Winthrop		Horace Turbeville	None

== Tournament ==
=== Bracket ===
To be added

=== Game results ===
1981 NAIA World Series game results
Date	Game	Winner	Score	Loser	Notes
June 2	Game 1	Grand Canyon	11–7	Lipscomb	
June 2	Game 2	William Jewell	10–6	John Brown	
June 2	Game 3	Winthrop	4–3	Spring Arbor	
June 2	Game 4	Liberty	8–5	Lubbock Christian	
June 3	Game 5	Lipscomb	6–3	John Brown	John Brown eliminated
June 3	Game 6	Spring Arbor	6–1	Lubbock Christian	Lubbock Christian eliminated
June 3	Game 7	Grand Canyon	8–5	Southeastern Oklahoma State	
June 3/4 (Note: Game 8 resumed on June 4 after rain delay.)	Game 8	Liberty	5–4	Azusa Pacific	
	Game 9	Southeastern Oklahoma State	7–5	Spring Arbor	Spring Arbor eliminated
	Game 10	Azusa Pacific	7–4	Lipscomb	Lipscomb eliminated
	Game 11	Grand Canyon	9–3	William Jewell	
	Game 12	Winthrop	4–1	Liberty	
	Game 13	Southeastern Oklahoma State	13–12	William Jewell	William Jewell eliminated
	Game 14	Azusa Pacific	11–1	Liberty	Liberty eliminated
	Game 15	Grand Canyon	9–2	Winthrop	
	Game 16	Winthrop	11–10	Southeastern Oklahoma State	Southeastern Oklahoma State eliminated
	Game 17	Grand Canyon	12–3	Azusa Pacific	Azusa Pacific eliminated
June 8	Final	Grand Canyon	12–4	Winthrop	Grand Canyon win NAIA World Series

== See also ==
- 1981 NCAA Division I baseball tournament
- 1981 NCAA Division II baseball tournament
- 1981 NCAA Division III baseball tournament
