= Texas Tech Red Raiders track and field =

Texas Tech Red Raiders
- University: Texas Tech University
- Head coach: Wes Kittley (24th season)
- Conference: Big 12
- Location: Lubbock, Texas, US
- Indoor track: Sports Performance Center
- Outdoor track: Fuller Track
- Colors: Scarlet and black

Conference Indoor Championships
- Men's: 2018, 2019, 2023, 2024, 2025, 2026; Women's: 2025, 2026

Conference Outdoor Championships
- Men's: 2005, 2014, 2018, 2019, 2023, 2025, 2026; Women's: 2025, 2026

Men Indoor National Championships
- 2024

Men Outdoor National Championships
- 2019

The Texas Tech Red Raiders track and field program represents Texas Tech University in the sport of track and field. The program includes separate men's and women's teams, both of which compete in Division I of the National Collegiate Athletic Association (NCAA). The Red Raiders have been charter members of the Big 12 Conference since the 1996–97 academic year. The Red Raiders host their home indoor meets in the Sports Performance Center and their home outdoor meets at Linda and Terry Fuller Track, both located on the Texas Tech University campus in Lubbock, Texas. Head coach Wes Kittley has led the Red Raiders teams since 2000.

== Notable people ==
- Sam Hurley
