= 1983 NAIA World Series =

1983 NAIA baseball tournament
- 1983 NAIA World Series
- Teams: 10
- Format: Double elimination
- Finals site: Chaparral Stadium; Lubbock, Texas
- Champions: Lubbock Christian (1st title)
- Winning coach: Larry Hays
- MVP: David Bulls (Lubbock Christian)

The 1983 NAIA World Series was a double-elimination tournament to determine the baseball champion of the National Association of Intercollegiate Athletics (NAIA). The tournament was held at Chaparral Stadium (Note: Hays Field was named Chaparral Stadium 1978–1999.) on the campus of Lubbock Christian College (Note: Lubbock Christian University was named Lubbock Christian College 1956–1988.) in Lubbock, Texas from May 30 through June 6. The Lubbock Christian Chaparrals won the tournament, the team's first NAIA baseball championship.

== Participants ==
1983 NAIA World Series participants
Team	Record	Head coach	Previous appearances
Coastal Carolina		Larry Carr	3 (1978, 1980, 1982)
Lewis-Clark State	65–4	Ed Cheff	5 (1976, 1978, 1979, 1980, 1982)
Liberty		Al Worthington	2 (1981, 1982)
Lubbock Christian	50–26	Larry Hays	4 (1977, 1980, 1981, 1982)
Newman		Paul Sanagorski	None
Southern Arkansas		Steve Goodheart	None
Southwestern		Jim Mallon	None
St. Francis (IL)		Gordie Gillespie	1 (1978)
Union		David Blackstock	None
William Jewell		Fred Flook	8 (1957, 1967, 1968, 1970, 1976, 1977, 1980, 1981)

== Tournament ==
=== Bracket ===
To be added

=== Game results ===
1983 NAIA World Series game results
Date	Game	Winner	Score	Loser	Notes
May 30	Game 1	Union	13–12	William Jewell	
May 30	Game 2	Lewis-Clark State	15–2	St. Francis (IL)	7 Innings
May 30	Game 3	Coastal Carolina	5–2	Liberty	
May 30	Game 4	Lubbock Christian	7–1	Southwestern	
May 31	Game 5	St. Francis (IL)	10–0	William Jewell	William Jewell eliminated
May 31	Game 6	Liberty	5–3	Southwestern	Southwestern eliminated
May 31	Game 7	Union	7–2	Southern Arkansas	
May 31	Game 8	Lubbock Christian	13–3	Newman	
June 1	Game 9	Liberty	4–3	Southern Arkansas	Southern Arkansas eliminated
June 1	Game 10	Newman	12–10	St. Francis	St. Francis eliminated
June 1	Game 11	Lewis-Clark	22–6	Union	
June 1	Game 12	Lubbock Christian	14–9	Coastal Carolina	
June 2	Game 13	Newman	23–12	Coastal Carolina	Coastal Carolina eliminated
June 2	Game 14	Union	21–17	Liberty	Liberty eliminated
June 2	Game 15	Lewis-Clark	18–17	Lubbock Christian	10 Innings
June 3	Game 16	Lewis-Clark	16–2	Newman	Newman eliminated
June 3	Game 17	Lubbock Christian	4–0	Union	Union eliminated
June 5 (Note: Originally scheduled for June 4, Game 18 was postponed to June 5 due to rain delay.)	Game 18	Lubbock Christian	4–3	Lewis-Clark	
June 6	Final	Lubbock Christian	12–4	Lewis-Clark	Lubbock Christian wins NAIA World Series

== See also ==
- 1983 NCAA Division I baseball tournament
- 1983 NCAA Division II baseball tournament
- 1983 NCAA Division III baseball tournament
