= Suiter =

Suiter is a surname. Notable people with the surname include:

- Amy Suiter (fl. early 21st century), American softball coach
- Gary Suiter (1945–1982), American basketball player
- Jane Suiter (fl. from 1996), Irish journalist and academic
- John Suiter (fl. from 2024), American politician
- Marilyn Suiter (fl. 1970–2018), American geologist
- Tom Suiter (fl. early 21st century), American sportscaster

== See also ==
- Sueter
