= 1982 NAIA World Series =

1982 NAIA baseball tournament
- 1982 NAIA World Series
- Teams: 10
- Format: Double elimination
- Finals site: Chaparral Stadium; Lubbock, Texas
- Champions: Grand Canyon (3rd title)
- Winning coach: Gil Stafford
- MVP: Pete Bethea (Grand Canyon)

The 1982 NAIA World Series was a double-elimination tournament to determine the baseball champion of the National Association of Intercollegiate Athletics (NAIA). The tournament was held at Chaparral Stadium (Note: Hays Field was named Chaparral Stadium 1978–1999.) on the campus of Lubbock Christian College (Note: Lubbock Christian University was named Lubbock Christian College 1956–1988.) in Lubbock, Texas from May 31 through June 5. The Grand Canyon Antelopes won the tournament, the team's third consecutive NAIA baseball championship.

== Participants ==
1982 NAIA World Series participants
Team	Record	Head coach	Previous appearances
Azusa Pacific		Tom Hicks	2 (1981, 1982)
Bemidji State		Bob Montebello	None
Birmingham–Southern		Bill Meyer	2 (1975, 1979)
Coastal Carolina		Larry Carr	2 (1978, 1980)
Grand Canyon		Gil Stafford	5 (1969, 1971, 1973, 1980, 1981)
Lewis-Clark State		Ed Cheff	4 (1976, 1978, 1979, 1980)
Liberty		Al Worthington	1 (1981)
Lubbock Christian	64–19	Larry Hays	3 (1977, 1980, 1981)
Saint Xavier		John Morrey	1 (1979)
Southeastern Oklahoma State		Mike Metheny	4 (1977, 1979, 1980, 1981)

== Tournament ==
=== Bracket ===
To be added

=== Game results ===
1982 NAIA World Series game results
Date	Game	Winner	Score	Loser	Notes
May 31	Game 1	Lewis-Clark State	2–0	Southeastern Oklahoma State	
May 31	Game 2	Coastal Carolina	5–4	Birmingham–Southern	
May 31	Game 3	Liberty	7–5	Saint Xavier	
May 31	Game 4	Azusa Pacific	9–8	Lubbock Christian	
June 1	Game 5	Southeastern Oklahoma State	13–9	Birmingham–Southern	Birmingham–Southern eliminated
June 1	Game 6	Saint Xavier	7–6	Lubbock Christian	Lubbock Christian eliminated
June 1	Game 7	Lewis-Clark State	11–5	Bemidji State	
June 1	Game 8	Grand Canyon	16–4	Azusa Pacific	
June 2	Game 9	Saint Xavier	21–12	Bemidji State	Bemidji State eliminated
June 2	Game 10	Azusa Pacific	2–1	Southeastern Oklahoma State	Southeastern Oklahoma State eliminated
June 2	Game 11	Lewis-Clark State	8–7	Coastal Carolina	
June 2	Game 12	Grand Canyon	5–3	Liberty	
June 3	Game 13	Azusa Pacific	9–2	Liberty	Liberty eliminated
June 3	Game 14	Saint Xavier	7–3	Coastal Carolina	Coastal Carolina eliminated
June 3	Game 15	Grand Canyon	3–1	Lewis-Clark State	
June 4	Game 16	Lewis-Clark State	2–1	Azusa Pacific	Azusa Pacific eliminated
June 4	Game 17	Grand Canyon	6–4	Saint Xavier	Saint Xavier eliminated
June 5	Final	Grand Canyon	10–6	Lewis-Clark State	Grand Canyon wins NAIA World Series

== See also ==
- 1982 NCAA Division I baseball tournament
- 1982 NCAA Division II baseball tournament
- 1982 NCAA Division III baseball tournament
