= Texas Tech Red Raiders cross country =

- Founded: 1925
- University: Texas Tech University
- Head coach: Jon Murray (5th season)
- Conference: Big 12
- Location: Lubbock, Texas, US
- Course: Linda and Terry Fuller Track
- Nickname: Red Raiders
- Colors: Scarlet and black

Women's NCAA appearances
- 2006, 2007, 2008, 2009

Women's conference champions
- 2008, 2009, 2010

The Texas Tech Red Raiders men's and women's cross country teams represent Texas Tech University, often referred to as Texas Tech. The teams compete as members of the Big 12 Conference in the National Collegiate Athletic Association (NCAA). The women's cross country team is only one of three teams to win the Big 12 Conference title since the conference was formed in 1996.

== Championships ==
=== Women's ===
The women's cross country team won its first conference championship in the 2008 Big 12 meet. Texas Tech went on to win the conference title in 2009 and 2010.
