= Lubbock Christian Chaparrals baseball =

Lubbock Christian Chaparrals
- Founded: 1962
- University: Lubbock Christian University
- Head coach: Nathan Blackwood (12th season)
- Conference: Lone Star
- Location: Lubbock, Texas
- Home stadium: Hays Field (Capacity: 3,000)
- Nickname: Chaparrals
- Colors: Blue and white

College World Series champions
- NAIA: 1983, 2009

College World Series runner-up
- NAIA: 2011

College World Series appearances
- NAIA: 1977, 1980, 1981, 1982, 1983, 1991, 2006, 2009, 2010, 2011

Conference tournament champions
- 2008, 2012

Conference regular season champions
- 1973, 1974, 1975, 1976, 1979, 1995, 1998, 2000, 2005, 2010

The Lubbock Christian Chaparrals represents Lubbock Christian University (LCU) in college baseball. The Chaparrals compete in the National Collegiate Athletic Association (NCAA) Division II as members of the Lone Star Conference. The Chaparrals won the NAIA World Series in 1983 and 2009, and placed runner-up in 2011. Since 1978, Lubbock Christian has played home games at Hays Field (formerly Chaparral Stadium). The Chaparrals are led by head coach Nathan Blackwood.

== History ==
Prior to joining the NCAA for the 2014 season, Lubbock Christian competed in the National Junior College Athletic Association (NJCAA) from 1962 to 1966, and National Association of Intercollegiate Athletics (NAIA) from 1971 to 2013.

== Conference affiliation ==
- Texoma Conference
- Sooner Athletic Conference (1995–2013)
- Heartland Conference (2014–2019)
- Lone Star Conference (2020–present)

== Ballpark ==
In 1978, Lubbock Christian began playing Chaparral Stadium. The Chaparrals were the host team for the NAIA World Series in 1981, 1982, and 1983, and Sooner Athletic Conference Baseball Tournament in 2006. The ballpark was renamed Hays Field, in 1999, to honor the Hays family, including former Chaparrals head baseball coach Larry Hays.

== Head coaches ==
№	Name	Seasons
1	Les Perrin	1962–1966
2	Larry Hays	1971–1986
3	Jimmy Shankle	1987–1991
4	Daren Hays	1992–1999
5	Bobby Sherrard	2002–2003
6	Nathan Blackwood	2004–present
