= Southwest Conference baseball tournament =

- Conference baseball championship
- Sport: Baseball
- Conference: Southwest Conference
- Played: 1977–1996
- Most championships: Texas (11)

Host stadiums
- Dan Law Field (1996); Olsen Field (1980, 1982, 1986, 1989, 1991, 1995); Disch–Falk Field (1977-79, 1981, 1983-84, 1987, 1990, 1993-94); George Cole Field (1985, 1988)

Host locations
- Lubbock, TX (1996); College Station, TX (1980, 1982, 1986, 1989, 1991, 1995); Austin, TX (1977-79, 1981, 1983-84, 1987, 1990, 1993-94); Fayetteville, AR (1985, 1988)

The Southwest Conference baseball tournament was the conference baseball championship of the NCAA Division I Southwest Conference from 1977 through 1996. The winner of the tournament received an automatic berth to the NCAA Division I Baseball Championship. Over the course of the event, Texas won 11 of 19 tournaments.

== Champions ==
The following is a list of conference champions and sites listed by year.

Year	Champion	Venue
1977	Baylor	Disch–Falk Field • Austin, TX
1978	Baylor	Disch–Falk Field • Austin, TX
1979	Texas	Disch–Falk Field • Austin, TX
1980	Texas	Olsen Field • College Station, TX
1981	Texas	Disch–Falk Field • Austin, TX
1982	Texas	Olsen Field • College Station, TX
1983	Texas	Disch–Falk Field • Austin, TX
1984	Texas	Disch–Falk Field • Austin, TX
1985	Arkansas	George Cole Field • Fayetteville, AR
1986	Texas A&M	Olsen Field • College Station, TX
1987	Texas	Disch–Falk Field • Austin, TX
1988	Texas	George Cole Field • Fayetteville, AR
1989	Texas A&M	Olsen Field • College Station, TX
1990	Texas	Disch–Falk Field • Austin, TX
1991	Texas	Olsen Field • College Station, TX
1992	No Tournament Held	
1993	Baylor	Disch–Falk Field • Austin, TX
1994	Texas	Disch–Falk Field • Austin, TX
1995	Texas Tech	Olsen Field • College Station, TX
1996	Rice	Dan Law Field • Lubbock, TX

== Most Valuable Player ==
Tournament	Player	Team
1995	Jason Totman	Texas Tech
1996	Jacques Landry	Rice

== See also ==
- Big 12 Conference baseball tournament
