= Sueter =

Sueter is a surname. Notable people with the surname include:

- Murray Sueter (1872–1960), British naval officer
- Tom Sueter (1750–1827), English cricketer

== See also ==
- Suéter, Argentinian music group
- Suiter, surname
