= 1995 Southwest Conference baseball tournament =

- Teams: 4
- Format: Double-elimination tournament
- Finals site: Olsen Field; College Station, Texas
- Champions: Texas Tech (1st title)
- Winning coach: Larry Hays (1st title)
- MVP: Jason Totman (Texas Tech)

1995 Southwest Conference baseball standings
	Conf.				Overall
Team	W		L	PCT	W		L	PCT
No. 10 Texas Tech ‍†‍‡‍^{y}	16	–	8	.667	51	–	14	.785
No. 15 Rice ‍‍‍^{y}	15	–	9	.625	43	–	19	.694
No. 12 Texas A&M ‍‍‍^{y}	15	–	9	.625	44	–	22	.667
No. 23 Texas ‍‍‍^{y}	14	–	10	.583	44	–	19	.698
Texas Christian ‍‍‍	11	–	13	.458	27	–	29	.482
Baylor ‍‍‍	7	–	17	.292	25	–	28	.472
Houston ‍‍‍	6	–	18	.250	26	–	29	.473
† – Conference champion ‡ – Tournament champion y – Invited to the NCAA tournament As of June 30, 1995; Rankings from Collegiate Baseball

The 1995 Southwest Conference baseball tournament was the league's annual postseason tournament used to determine the Southwest Conference's (SWC) automatic bid to the 1995 NCAA Division I baseball tournament. The tournament was held from May 18 through 21 at Olsen Field on the main campus of Texas A&M University in College Station, Texas.

The number one seed Texas Tech Red Raiders went 3–1 to win the team's first SWC tournament under head coach Larry Hays.

== Format and seeding ==
The tournament featured the top four finishers of the SWC's seven teams in a double-elimination tournament.

Regular season conference champion Texas Tech received the first seed while Rice claimed the second seed by tiebreaker over Texas A&M, and Texas received the fourth seed.

Place	Team	Conference				Overall			Seed
Place	Team	W	L	%	GB	W	L	%	Seed
1	Texas Tech	16	8	.667	-	51	14	.785	1
2	Rice	15	9	.625	1	43	19	.694	2
3	Texas A&M	15	9	.625	1	44	22	.667	3
4	Texas	14	10	.583	2	44	19	.698	4
5	TCU	11	13	.458	5	27	29	.482	-
6	Baylor	7	17	.292	9	25	28	.472	-
7	Houston	6	18	.250	10	26	29	.473	-

== Tournament ==
First round
1	Texas Tech	9
4	Texas	3
2	Rice	6
3	Texas A&M	8
Lower round 1
4	Texas	6
2	Rice	0

Semi-finals
1	Texas Tech	6
3	Texas A&M	5
Lower final
3	Texas A&M	11
4	Texas	3

Final
1	Texas Tech
3	Texas A&M
