= Sonya Lutter =

American financial planner and academic

- Born: Sonya Lynn Depenbusch
- Other names: Sonya Britt-Lutter; Sonya Britt
- Occupations: Financial planner; Family therapist; Professor

Academic background
- Education: Kansas State University (BS), 2003, (MS), 2005; Texas Tech University (PhD), 2010
- Thesis: Three Essays on Money Arguments Between Spouses (2010)
- Doctoral advisor: Sandra J. Huston; Dorothy B. Durband

Academic work
- Discipline: Personal financial planning
- Website: sonyalutter.com

Sonya Lutter is an American financial planner, academic, author, and professor. She is the director of Financial Health and Wellness in the School of Financial Planning at the Texas Tech University College of Human Sciences.

== Early life and education ==
Lutter grew up in the rural town of Kingman, Kansas, and graduated from Kingman High School in 2000.

She attended Kansas State University (KSU) and was awarded a Bachelor of Science degree in personal financial planning 2003. She then attained a Master of Science in 2003 in marriage and family therapy. Lutter earned a PhD in 2010 from Texas Tech University in personal financial planning.

Texas Tech University School of Financial Planning named her a Distinguished Alumni in 2023.

== Career and research ==
While working on her PhD, Lutter co-founded the Financial Therapy Association and served as the inaugural president in 2009. She became an assistant professor of family studies and human services in 2010 at KSU, a position she held until taking an associate professor position in 2014. She became a full professor in 2019. While a professor at KSU, she was the Program Director of the Personal Finance Planning department, the Director of the School of Family Studies and Human Services, and was a Mary L. Vanier endowed professor. While under her direction, the School of Family Studies and Human Services changed names to the Department of Applied Human Sciences.

In 2014 the Association for Financial Counseling and Planning Education gave her an outstanding journal article award. In 2017 the Financial Planning Association awarded her with the Best theoretical research paper award.

She was the director of research and education for Herbers & Company in 2021.

She has served as associate editor for the Journal of Family and Economic Issues, on the editorial board of the Journal of Financial Therapy and on the international scientific board of the Italian Journal of Sociology of Education.

In 2022, she was named the director Financial Health and Wellness in the School of Financial Planning at Texas Tech University. She also serves as the Executive Director of the Institute for Systemic Financial Professionals.

== Selected publications ==
- Dew, Jeffrey, Sonya Britt, and Sandra Huston. "Examining the relationship between financial issues and divorce." Family Relations 61, no. 4 (2012): 615-628.
- Britt, Sonya L., David Allen Ammerman, Sarah F. Barrett, and Scott Jones. "Student loans, financial stress, and college student retention." Journal of Student Financial Aid 47, no. 1 (2017): 3.
- Klontz, Bradley, Sonya L. Britt, Jennifer Mentzer, and Ted Klontz. "Money beliefs and financial behaviors: Development of the Klontz Money Script Inventory." Journal of Financial Therapy 2, no. 1 (2011): 1.
