= 1996 Southwest Conference baseball tournament =

- Teams: 7
- Format: Double-elimination tournament
- Finals site: Dan Law Field; Lubbock, Texas
- Champions: Rice (1st title)
- Winning coach: Wayne Graham (1st title)
- MVP: Jacques Landry (Rice)
- Attendance: 31,542 (Total); 2,628 (Average)

1996 Southwest Conference baseball standings
	Conf.				Overall
Team	W		L	PCT	W		L	PCT
No. 16 Texas ‍†‍‍^{y}	17	–	7	.708	39	–	24	.619
No. 17 Texas Tech ‍‍‍^{y}	15	–	9	.625	49	–	15	.766
Texas A&M ‍‍‍	12	–	12	.500	37	–	21	.638
Baylor ‍‍‍	11	–	13	.458	32	–	27	.542
Texas Christian ‍‍‍	11	–	13	.458	34	–	33	.507
Houston ‍‍‍	9	–	15	.375	29	–	28	.509
No. 25 Rice ‍‍‡‍^{y}	9	–	15	.375	42	–	23	.646
† – Conference champion ‡ – Tournament champion y – Invited to the NCAA tournament As of June 30, 1996; Rankings from Collegiate Baseball

The 1996 Southwest Conference baseball tournament was the league's annual postseason tournament used to determine the Southwest Conference's (SWC) automatic bid to the 1996 NCAA Division I baseball tournament. The tournament was held from May 15 through 18 at Dan Law Field on the campus of Texas Tech University in Lubbock, Texas, and drew a total attendance of 31,542. This was the first time the SWC tournament was held in Lubbock, and the final conference tournament before the conference disbanded.

The sixth-seeded Rice Owls went undefeated to win the team's first SWC tournament under fifth-season head coach Wayne Graham.

== Format and seeding ==
The 1996 SWC tournament was the first, and only, to feature all teams in a double-elimination tournament over four rounds.

The SWC regular season champion, Texas Longhorns, received the tournament's only first-round bye while the remaining six teams were seeded based on their regular season conference standings. TCU claimed the fourth seed by tiebreaker over Baylor, while Rice earned the sixth seed over Houston by tiebreaker.

Team	W	L	PCT	GB	Seed
Texas	17	7	.708	–	1
Texas Tech	15	9	.625	2	2
Texas A&M	12	12	.500	5	3
TCU	11	13	.458	6	4
Baylor	11	13	.458	6	5
Rice	9	15	.375	8	6
Houston	9	15	.375	8	7

== Tournament ==
First round	Second round	Third round	Finals
1	Texas	7
4	TCU	5
4	TCU	12
5	Baylor	5
1	Texas	6
6	Rice	9
3	Texas A&M	7
6	Rice	9
6	Rice	7
2	Texas Tech	3
2	Texas Tech	11
7	Houston	5
6	Rice	16	—
1	Texas	8	—
Lower round 1	Lower round 2	Lower round 3	Lower final
3	Texas A&M	1
3	Texas A&M	12	5	Baylor	8	1	Texas	8
7	Houston	10	5	Baylor	4	2	Texas Tech	7
2	Texas Tech	10
4	TCU	6
2	Texas Tech	10
