= National Intercollegiate Rodeo Association =

College rodeo organizer

NIRA logo

The National Intercollegiate Rodeo Association (NIRA), based in Walla Walla, Washington, was established in 1949. It sanctions more than 100 college rodeos every year in the United States, and represents over 3,500 student athletes attending more than 135 member colleges and universities. As well as regional rodeos, the NIRA sanctions the College National Finals Rodeo (CNFR) every June.

== Team Champions ==
=== Men ===
List of College National Finals Rodeo team champions
Year	School	Venue	Location
1949	Sul Ross State University	Cow Palace	Daly City, California
1950	Sul Ross State University	Cow Palace	Daly City, California
1951	Sul Ross State University	Will Rogers Coliseum	Fort Worth, Texas
1952	Colorado State University		
1953	Hardin-Simmons University	Hardin-Simmons University	Abilene, Texas
1954	Colorado State University	Cow Palace	Daly City, California
1955	Texas Tech University		Lake Charles, Louisiana
1956	Sam Houston State University		Colorado Springs, Colorado
1957	McNeese State University		Colorado Springs, Colorado
1958	McNeese State University		Colorado Springs, Colorado
1960	Cal Poly, San Luis Obispo		Clayton, New Mexico
1961	University of Wyoming		Sacramento, California
1962	Sul Ross State University		Littleton, Colorado
1963	Casper College		Littleton, Colorado
1964	Casper College	Wyoming State Fairgrounds	Douglas, Wyoming
1965	Casper College		Laramie, Wyoming
1966	Casper College		Vermillion, South Dakota
1967	Tarleton State University		St. George, Utah
1968	Sam Houston State University		Sacramento, California
1969	Eastern New Mexico University	Days of '76 Arena	Deadwood, South Dakota
1970	Cal Poly, San Luis Obispo	Brick Breeden Fieldhouse	Bozeman, Montana
1971	Cal Poly, San Luis Obispo	Brick Breeden Fieldhouse	Bozeman, Montana
1972	Montana State University	Brick Breeden Fieldhouse	Bozeman, Montana
1973	Cal Poly, San Luis Obispo	Brick Breeden Fieldhouse	Bozeman, Montana
1974	Eastern New Mexico State University	Brick Breeden Fieldhouse	Bozeman, Montana
1975	Montana State University	Brick Breeden Fieldhouse	Bozeman, Montana
1976	Southeastern Oklahoma State University	Brick Breeden Fieldhouse	Bozeman, Montana
1977	Southeastern Oklahoma State University	Brick Breeden Fieldhouse	Bozeman, Montana
1978	Southeastern Oklahoma State University	Brick Breeden Fieldhouse	Bozeman, Montana
1979	Southeastern Oklahoma State University	Brick Breeden Fieldhouse	Bozeman, Montana
1980	Southeastern Oklahoma State University	Brick Breeden Fieldhouse	Bozeman, Montana
1981	Dawson Community College	Brick Breeden Fieldhouse	Bozeman, Montana
1982	Sul Ross State University	Brick Breeden Fieldhouse	Bozeman, Montana
1983	Sul Ross State University	Brick Breeden Fieldhouse	Bozeman, Montana
1984	Texas State University	Brick Breeden Fieldhouse	Bozeman, Montana
1985	Southwestern Oklahoma State University	Brick Breeden Fieldhouse	Bozeman, Montana
1986	Western Texas College	Brick Breeden Fieldhouse	Bozeman, Montana
1987	Blue Mountain Community College	Brick Breeden Fieldhouse	Bozeman, Montana
1988	Montana State University	Brick Breeden Fieldhouse	Bozeman, Montana
1989	Odessa College	Brick Breeden Fieldhouse	Bozeman, Montana
1990	Montana State University	Brick Breeden Fieldhouse	Bozeman, Montana
1991	Montana State University	Brick Breeden Fieldhouse	Bozeman, Montana
1992	Southwestern Oklahoma State University	Brick Breeden Fieldhouse	Bozeman, Montana
1993	Southwestern Oklahoma State University	Brick Breeden Fieldhouse	Bozeman, Montana
1994	Vernon College	Brick Breeden Fieldhouse	Bozeman, Montana
1995	Montana State University	Brick Breeden Fieldhouse	Bozeman, Montana
1996	College of Southern Idaho	Brick Breeden Fieldhouse	Bozeman, Montana
1997	Panhandle State University	Don Barnett Arena	Rapid City, South Dakota
1998	Panhandle State University	Don Barnett Arena	Rapid City, South Dakota
1999	Southwestern Oklahoma State University	Casper Events Center	Casper, Wyoming
2000	Panhandle State University	Casper Events Center	Casper, Wyoming
2001	College of Southern Idaho	Casper Events Center	Casper, Wyoming
2002	College of Southern Idaho	Casper Events Center	Casper, Wyoming
2003	Vernon College	Casper Events Center	Casper, Wyoming
2004	Panhandle State University	Casper Events Center	Casper, Wyoming
2005	Tarleton State University	Casper Events Center	Casper, Wyoming
2006	West Texas A&M University	Casper Events Center	Casper, Wyoming
2007	Ranger College	Casper Events Center	Casper, Wyoming
2008	Walla Walla Community College	Casper Events Center	Casper, Wyoming
2009	Western Texas College	Casper Events Center	Casper, Wyoming
2010	Vernon College	Casper Events Center	Casper, Wyoming
2011	Sam Houston State University	Casper Events Center	Casper, Wyoming
2012	Walla Walla Community College	Casper Events Center	Casper, Wyoming
2013	Panhandle State University	Casper Events Center	Casper, Wyoming
2014	University of Tennessee at Martin	Casper Events Center	Casper, Wyoming
2015	Tarleton State University	Casper Events Center	Casper, Wyoming
2016	Feather River College	Casper Events Center	Casper, Wyoming
2017	Panhandle State University	Casper Events Center	Casper, Wyoming
2018	Panhandle State University	Casper Events Center	Casper, Wyoming
2019	Panola College	Casper Events Center	Casper, Wyoming
2020		No CNFR this year due to COVID-19 restrictions.	
2021	Clarendon College	Ford Wyoming Center	Casper, Wyoming
2022	Tarleton State University	Ford Wyoming Center	Casper, Wyoming
2023	Clarendon College	Ford Wyoming Center	Casper, Wyoming
2024	Tarleton State University	Ford Wyoming Center	Casper, Wyoming
2025	Tarleton State University	Ford Wyoming Center	Casper, Wyoming
2026	Clarendon College	Ford Wyoming Center	Casper, Wyoming

=== Women ===
Year and Champion	Year and Champion	Year and Champion	Year and Champion	Year and Champion	Year and Champion	Year and Champion	Year and Champion
1961 Sam Houston St. Teacher’s College (TX)	1970 Tarleton State College (TX)	1979 Central Arizona College	1988 Southwestern Oklahoma State	1997 Weber State (UT)	2006 Weber State	2015 Blue Mountain Community College (OR)	2024 University of West Alabama
1962 Sul Ross State College (TX)	1971 Tarleton State College	1980 Southeastern Oklahoma State	1989 Cal Poly, San Luis Obispo	1998 Lewis-Clark State College (ID)	2007 Wyoming	2016 Blue Mountain Community College	2025 Southwest Texas College
1963 Colorado State	1972 Eastern New Mexico	1981 Eastern New Mexico	1990 Wyoming	1999 Nevada-Las Vegas	2008 Nevada-Las Vegas	2017 Sam Houston State	2026 Texas A&M
1964 Colorado State	1973 Arizona	1982 Southeastern Oklahoma State	1991 Wyoming	2000 Western Texas College	2009 Wyoming	2018 McNeese State	2027
1965 Sam Houston State College	1974 Sam Houston State	1983 Eastern New Mexico	1992 Walla Walla Community College (WA)	2001 Oklahoma State	2010 Gillette College (WY)	2019 McNeese State	2028
1966 Arizona State	1975 New Mexico State	1984 Sam Houston State	1993 Wyoming	2002 Texas A&M	2011 Montana State	2020 No CNFR this year due to COVID-19 restrictions.	2029
1967 Eastern New Mexico	1976 New Mexico State	1985 Sul Ross State	1994 Southwestern Oklahoma State	2003 Vernon College (TX)	2012 Texas Tech - Lubbock	2021 Montana State	2030
1968 Sam Houston State College	1977 Utah State	1986 Montana State	1995 Southeastern Oklahoma State	2004 Oklahoma State	2013 Idaho State	2022 Weatherford College	2031
1969 Tarleton State College (TX)	1978 Central Arizona College	1987 Scottsdale Community College (AZ)	1996 Southeastern Oklahoma State	2005 Tarleton State	2014 Central Arizona	2023 University of West Alabama	2032

== See also ==
Intercollegiate sports team champions
