= Wes Kittley =

American track and field coach

Current position
- Title: Head coach
- Team: Texas Tech
- Conference: Big 12
- Annual salary: $542,000

Biographical details
- Born: c. 1959 (age 66–67); Rule, Texas, U.S.

Playing career
- 1981: Abilene Christian
- Position: 800M

Coaching career (HC unless noted)
- 1983–1993: Abilene Christian (women's)
- 1993–1999: Abilene Christian (men's/women's)
- 2000–present: Texas Tech

Administrative career (AD unless noted)
- 1997–1999: Abilene Christian (assoc. AD)

Accomplishments and honors

Championships
- 44

Awards
- Men's Regional Coach of the Year (2015, 2017, 2018); Women's Regional Coach of the Year (2009, 2012); Big 12 Conference Men's Coach of the Year (2014); Lone Star Conference Hall of Fame

Wes Kittley (born c. 1959) is the current head coach of the Texas Tech Red Raiders track and field team. He has produced several national champions and Olympians in Sally Kipyego and Kennedy Kithuka.

== Career ==
=== Abilene Christian, 1983–1999 ===
Kittley was the women's track and field head coach at Abilene Christian University (ACU) from 1985–99. In 1993, the Men's and Women's programs merged. While at ACU, Kittley won his first NCAA Women's Outdoor Track and Field Championship at the Division II level in 1985. He would go on to win the Championship in 1986, 1987, and 1988. Kittley's teams would also win many NCAA Women's Indoor Track and Field Championships during his tenure in 1988, 1989, 1990, 1991, 1993, 1994, 1995, 1996, 1997, 1998, and 1999. Kittley's program won 29 national track and field championships, the most in Division I and II combined, and three short of the all-time record held by Jim Steen of Kenyon College.

During his 15-year tenure at ACU, Kittley coached 12 Olympic qualifiers, 3 Pan-American Games athletes, five World University Games athletes, 16 athletes who qualified for the world championships, and one United States national champion.

=== Texas Tech, 2000–present ===
In 2000, Kittley departed Abilene Christian to accept the head coaching job at Texas Tech University. In 2019, the Red Raiders won the Division I men's outdoor national championship; in 2024, Kittley lead the Red Raiders to their first indoor national championship. During his tenure, Kittley has produced many national champions:

Athlete	Event	Season
Jacorian Duffield	Men's High Jump	2015 Outdoor
Jacorian Duffield	Men's High Jump	2015 Indoor
Sally Kipyego	Cross Country	2006
Sally Kipyego	Cross Country	2007
Sally Kipyego	3000M	2007 Indoor
Sally Kipyego	5000M	2007 Indoor
Sally Kipyego	10,000M	2007 Outdoor
Sally Kipyego	Cross Country	2008
Sally Kipyego	5000M	2008 Indoor
Sally Kipyego	5000M	2008 Outdoor
Sally Kipyego	5000M	2009 Indoor
D'Andra Carter	Discus	2009 Outdoor
Bryce Lamb	Triple Jump	2013 Indoor
Kennedy Kithuka	5000M	2013 Indoor
Kennedy Kithuka	Cross Country	2012
Julian Wruck	Discus	2011 Outdoor
Jonathan Johnson	800M	2006 Outdoor

In addition to national champions, Kittley is responsible for producing 205 All-Americans, and 111 Big 12 Conference champions. He guided Texas Tech to its first Big 12 team title in school history during the 2005 season. Kennedy Kithuka, one of Kittley's athletes, went undefeated during the 2012 season and was named the 2012 Male Athlete of the Year for Cross Country. The men's team would win the Big 12 Conference again in 2014 on their home track. Kittley was named the Big 12 Conference Men's Coach of the Year for the team's performance. The Red Raiders swept the Big 12 Championships in 2018, winning both the indoor and outdoor titles for the first time in program history.

Kittley was named the Women's Regional Coach of the Year in 2009 and 2012. He picked up the Men's Regional Coach of the Year award in 2015, 2017, and 2018. In 2006, he was also named to the Lone Star Conference's Hall of Honor.

Kittley's contract with Texas Tech received a 5-year extension in August 2014 to 2019 with a base salary of $265,000 increasing by $5,000 every year.

=== Olympic medalists ===
Athlete	Event	Medal	Season
Gil Roberts	Men's 4 x 400 metres relay	Gold	2016 Summer Olympics
Michael Mathieu	Men's 4 x 400 metres relay	Bronze	2016 Summer Olympics
Michael Mathieu	Men's 4 x 400 metres relay	Gold	2012 Summer Games
Shereefa Lloyd	Women's 4 × 400 metres relay	Bronze	2012 Summer Games
Sally Kipyego	Women's 10,000 metres	Silver	2012 Summer Games
Shereefa Lloyd	Women's 4 × 400 metres relay	Bronze	2008 Summer Games
Michael Mathieu	Men's 4 × 400 metres relay	Silver	2008 Summer Games
Andrae Williams	Men's 4 × 400 metres relay	Silver	2008 Summer Games

== Personal life ==
Kittley was born in Rule, Texas and is married to Linda Rhoads. They have three sons including Zach, who serves as head football coach at Florida Atlantic University.

Kittley is a graduate of Abilene Christian University, with a bachelor's degree in physical education, and a master's degree in school administration. He was a three-time NAIA All-American in the 800M while he attended.
