= National Letter of Intent =

US college athletic recruiting document

The National Letter of Intent (NLI) is a document used to indicate a student athlete's commitment to participating in National Collegiate Athletic Association (NCAA) colleges and universities in the United States. The NCAA Eligibility Center manages the daily operations of the NLI program while the Collegiate Commissioners Association (CCA) provides governance oversight of the program. Started in 1964 with seven conferences and eight independent institutions, the program included 676 Division I and II participating institutions through the 2023–24 school year. The NLI was eliminated in Division I in fall 2024, but remains in use in Division II. There are designated dates for different sports, and these dates are commonly referred to as "Signing Days".

Division III institutions are specifically banned from using the NLI, or any similar document that is not executed by non-athletes at those institutions.

NLIs are typically faxed by the recruited student to the university's athletic department on a National Signing Day. The NLI is a voluntary program with regard to both institutions and student-athletes. No prospective student-athlete or parent is required to sign the National Letter of Intent, and no institution is required to join the program.

== History ==
J. William Davis, Professor of Government and Faculty Athletics Representative at Texas Technological College (now Texas Tech University), created the National Letter of Intent program in 1964. He was assisted by Howard Grubbs, who was Commissioner of the Southwest Conference at the time. It was not directly affiliated with the NCAA at the time of its creation and was created to protect both the university and student from either party backing out. In October 2007, the NCAA became responsible for the administration of the program.

== NLIs and the recruiting process ==
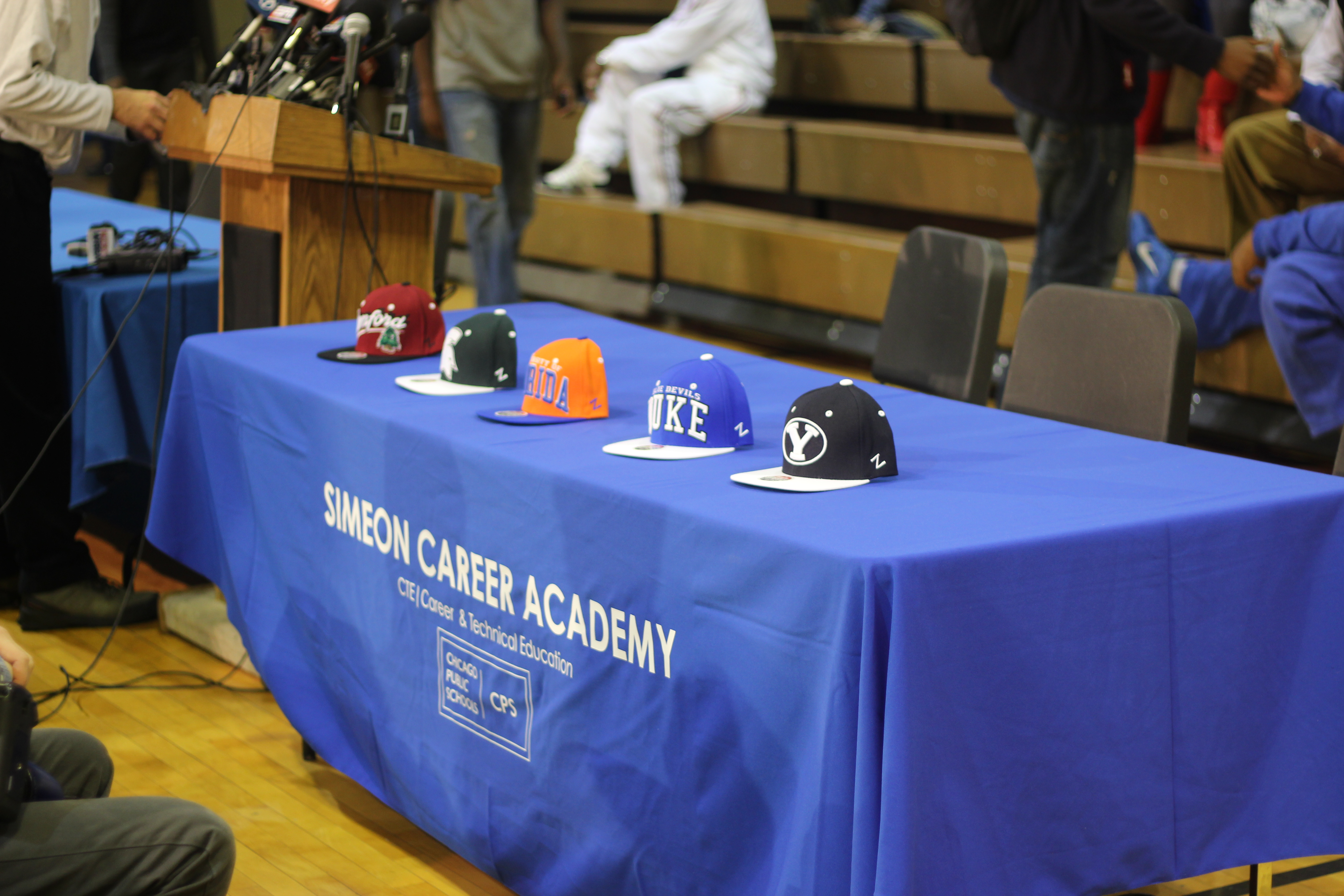
Blue chip athletes often end recruiting with a hat selection ceremony in which they make an oral commitment, which generally leads to the formal signing of a National Letter of Intent.

National Letters of Intent may only be signed by prospective student-athletes who will be entering a four-year institution for the first time in the academic year after they sign the NLI. Recruits who have signed NLIs must attend the schools they have signed with in order to receive financial aid, and NCAA rules forbid coaches from recruiting them further; these restrictions aim to add certainty to the recruiting process for players (who are certain to receive aid) and coaches (who are certain that a recruit will attend their school). By contrast, oral commitments are nonbinding; recruits may change or revoke an oral commitment at any time, and coaches may continue to recruit an orally committed player.

The restrictive nature of the NLI is designed to be advantageous to both prospective student-athletes and intercollegiate athletics programs. Intercollegiate athletics departments are not required to provide financial aid in cases where a student-athlete is not admitted for academic reasons. Seth Davis, a columnist for Sports Illustrated, has suggested that this arrangement is actually disadvantageous to student-athletes, as they have no recourse if an athletics department decides not to admit a player for non-academic reasons; for example, an athletics department could replace a signed recruit with another recruit by claiming that the first one was not admitted for academic reasons.

On October 9, 2024, the NCAA Division I Council abolished the NLI program for that division, effective immediately. The NLI was replaced by written offers of athletic financial aid that provide most of the NLI's core functions. The abolition of the NLI in Division I was reportedly tied to the settlement of the House v. NCAA legal case, expected to lead to a revenue-sharing model across college sports.

== Faxing of letters ==
Given the methods of transmitting NLIs that are available under NCAA rules, the letters are typically faxed by students to the university's athletic department.

Although NCAA rules allow for use of postal mail, courier, and electronic transmission, nearly all students opt for fax machines, because of the speed of transmission and the ease of verifying signatures sent that way.

== College football ==
In NCAA Division I and II college football recruiting, there are two main recruit signing periods — early and regular.

Added in 2017, college football has a short, three-day early signing period during the third week of December. Early signees have the opportunity to sign with their college team over a month before the regular signing period. The first day of the early period is considered college football's first National Signing Day.

The regular signing period opens during the first week of February. The first day of this period is considered college football's second National Signing Day. The regular signing period closes on April 1 for NCAA Division I and on August 1 for NCAA Division II.

== See also ==
- College recruiting
