= Dan Law Field at Rip Griffin Park =

Baseball stadium at Texas Tech University in Lubbock

Coordinates: 33°35′19″N 101°52′36″W

- "The Law"
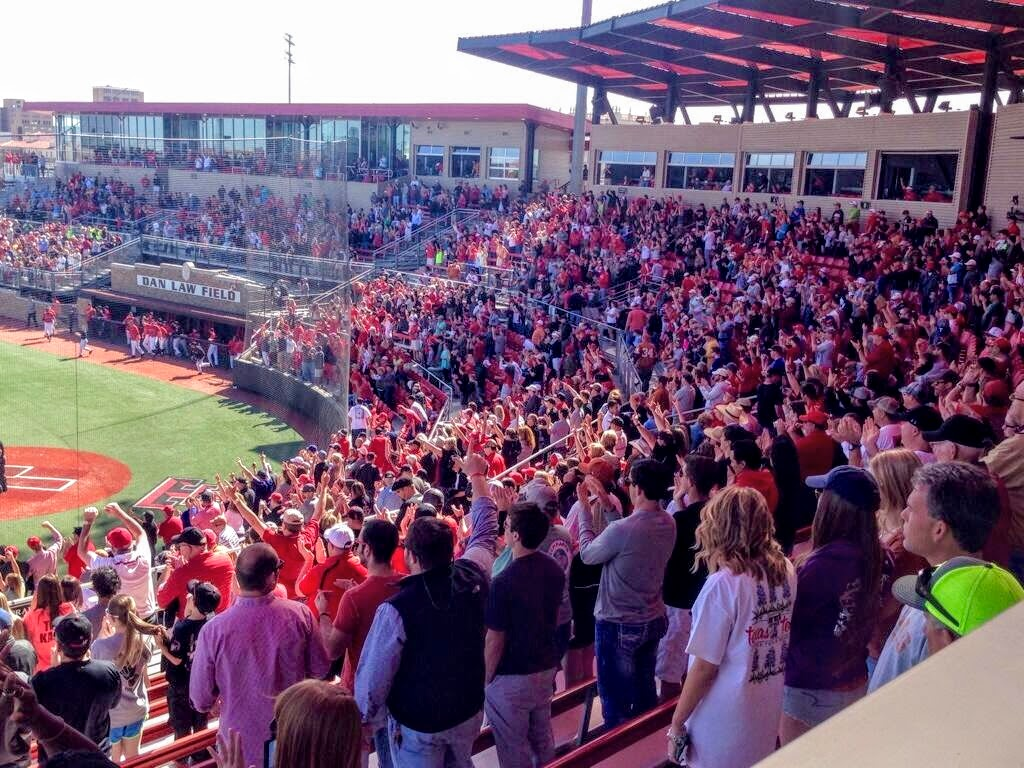
- Dan Law Field in 2014
- Interactive map of Dan Law Field at Rip Griffin Park
- Former names: Dan Law Field (1988–2011)
- Location: Lubbock, Texas, United States
- Owner: Texas Tech University
- Operator: Texas Tech University
- Capacity: 4,432
- Executive suites: 10
- Surface: FieldTurf
- Scoreboard: 22x48 LED
- Record attendance: (pre-renovation) 5,814 - May 26, 1996 (NCAA Central Regional); 4,898 - June 12, 2016 (NCAA Super Regional)
- Field size: Left Field: 330 ft Center Field: 404 ft Right Field: 330 ft

Construction
- Opened: 1988
- Renovated: 1994, 2001, 2009, 2012, 2016
- Expanded: 1996
- Architect: MWM Architects (renovation)
- Structural engineer: Henderson Rodgers (renovation)
- General contractor: Lee Lewis Construction (renovation)

Tenants
- Texas Tech Red Raiders baseball (NCAA) (1988–present); Lubbock Crickets (CBL) (1995–1998)

Dan Law Field at Rip Griffin Park, nicknamed "The Law", is the home stadium of the Texas Tech Red Raiders baseball team in Lubbock, Texas. It is located on the Texas Tech University campus, adjacent to Galaxy Stadium and Fuller Track. Dan Law Field was rated as one of the top three places to watch a college baseball game by Sports Illustrated On Campus.

== Name and capacity ==
From 1988 through 2011, the ballpark was named Dan Law Field after Alabama native, Lubbock businessman, and former Texas Tech baseball player Dan Law (1932–2019), who was instrumental in the renovation of the stadium. Law played for the Red Raider football team from 1955 to 1956 and baseball from 1956 to 1957. Since the 2012 season, the ballpark has been known as Dan Law Field at Rip Griffin Park. An anonymous donor to the 2012 renovation requested the field be named after Rip Griffin, a long-time supporter of Red Raider baseball and Texas Tech athletics. The ballpark has a permanent seating capacity of 4,432. Renovated in 1996 and 2001, the stadium underwent another upgrade in 2007 and its latest in 2012.

In 2015, the Red Raiders ranked 13th among Division I baseball programs in attendance, averaging 3,665 per home game. A record attendance of 4,898 was set on June 12, 2016, when Texas Tech hosted East Carolina University in the Lubbock Super Regional matchup.

== Usage ==
=== Tournaments ===
- NCAA Division I baseball tournament Regional: 1996, 1997, 1999, 2016, 2017, 2018
- NCAA Division I baseball tournament Super Regional: 2014, 2016, 2018
- NJCAA Division I Southwestern District baseball tournament: 2011, 2012, 2014–2017
- SWC tournament: 1996

== See also ==
- List of NCAA Division I baseball venues
