= Greg Sands =

American golf coach

Current position
- Title: Head coach
- Team: Texas Tech

Coaching career (HC unless noted)
- ?: Texas Tech

Greg Sands is the current head coach of the Texas Tech Red Raiders men's golf team.
