= Stacey Totman =

Coaching career (HC unless noted)
- 2000-2009: Texas Tech

Stacey Totman is the former head coach of the Texas Tech Red Raiders women's golf team.
