= Jon Murray (coach) =

Current position
- Title: Head coach
- Team: Texas Tech
- Conference: Big 12

Biographical details
- Education: Harding University (1986-1990)

Coaching career (HC unless noted)
- ?: Texas Tech

Jon Murray is the current head coach of the Texas Tech Red Raiders and Lady Raiders cross country teams. He was named Big 12 Women's Cross Country Coach of the Year in 2008, 2009, and 2010.
