= College National Finals Rodeo =

(CNFR Logo)

The College National Finals Rodeo (CNFR), sanctioned by the National Intercollegiate Rodeo Association (NIRA), is held every June. The inaugural event was hosted at the Cow Palace in Daly City, California, in 1949. Since 1999, the CNFR has been held at the Ford Wyoming Center in Casper, Wyoming. Both men and women rodeo athletes compete for the honor of becoming national champions in their events. Colleges also compete as teams for the chance of winning the men's and women's national college rodeo championship.

There was no CNFR in 2020 because of the COVID-19 pandemic.

In the 2024 event, Madalyn Richards from Texas A&M won the women's all-around title Wacey Schalla from Clarendon College won the men's all around title.

== CNFR events ==
- Bareback bronc riding
- Breakaway roping
- Steer wrestling
- Team roping
- Goat tying
- Saddle bronc riding
- Tie-down roping
- Barrel racing
- Bull riding
