= Thomas C. Butler =

American scientist

- Born: Thomas Campbell Butler; 1939 or 1940 (age 85–86)
- Education: Vanderbilt University; U.S. Naval Medical Research Unit
- Spouse: Elisabeth Butler
- Scientific career
- Workplaces: Texas Tech University

Thomas Campbell Butler (born 1939 or 1940) is an American scientist specializing in infectious diseases including cholera and bubonic plague at Texas Tech University since 1987. He is credited with making oral hydration the standard treatment for diarrhea.

Butler was arrested in 2003 and prosecuted by the United States Justice Department for, among many other charges, illegal transportation of plague samples, tax evasion, fraud, and embezzlement. He was convicted of 47 out of 69 charges and served a two-year jail term ending in December 2005, having rejected a plea bargain offer.

== Early life and education ==
Butler received his MD degree from Vanderbilt University in 1967 and served in the U.S. Naval Medical Research Unit studying infectious disease, attaining the rank of lieutenant commander.

== Arrest ==
In January 2003, Butler reported 30 vials of plague missing from his laboratory to safety officers at Texas Tech University. The missing vials apparently triggered a bioterrorism response plan. Sixty law enforcement officers were sent to investigate, and they arrested Butler after questioning him. The Justice Department accused Butler of illegal transportation of plague samples, tax evasion, fraud, and embezzlement, among other charges. Butler pleaded not guilty in September 2003, turning down a plea-bargain offer for a six-month sentence in exchange for a guilty plea.

== Conviction ==
He was convicted on December 1, 2003 of 47 of the 69 charges filed against him. Of the convictions, three were for improper shipment of plague samples to research collaborators in Tanzania and forty-four were related to what prosecutors called "shadow contracts" for his research at Texas Tech, whereby "part of the payment for clinical trials went directly to Dr. Butler instead of through university accounts."

== Prosecution ==
The prosecution of Butler was met with disapproval by many groups of scientists, including colleagues, the National Academy of Sciences, several Nobel Prize winners, and the Federation of American Scientists. Critics of the prosecution suggested that the aggressive prosecution of a prominent scientist would make other scientists reluctant to carry out research in dangerous diseases for fear of similar prosecutions.
