= J. William Davis =

- J. William Davis, American professor and academic administrator
- Occupation: Professor

J. William Davis was an American academic administrator who is known as the father of the National Letter of Intent for college athletics.

Davis was chairman of Texas Tech University's Athletic Council from 1948 to 1969. He created a form, the National Letter of Intent, to prevent coaches from pulling recruits from other schools. The form was adopted in 1964 by the College Commissioners Association.

== Education and career ==
Davis was educated at Tarleton State College, Texas A&M University, and the University of Texas. He came to Texas Technological College (now Texas Tech University) in 1938 as a professor of government. Davis was named head of the department in 1944 and served in that position for twenty years. Davis served as president of the Border Intercollegiate Athletic Association in 1953-1954. As chairman of the athletic council from 1948–1967, he was instrumental in getting Texas Tech into the Southwest Athletic Conference. As the schools representative to the SWC, he served as vice president and later president of that body. He was the SWC’s representative to the National Collegiate Athletic Association, where he served as vice president from 1967–1971. He was best known as the Father of the Letter of Intent, and he was founder and chairman of the steering committee for the Interconference Letter of Intent. Both the library in the Political Science Department at Texas Tech and the Athletic Dining Hall are named for him.

An expert on the Texas Constitution, Davis served from 1957-1961 on the Citizens Advisory Committee on Constitutional Revision. He wrote the definitive work on the Texas Lieutenant Governor, "And There Shall Also Be A Lieutenant Governor," 1967.

== Personal life ==
Davis was born in 1910, one of 3 children of Dean J. Thomas and Uta Davis. William married Edwena Barnes in 1933; the couple had three children: James Thomas, Carolyn Edwena, and Donald Bruce. He died in 1995.
