= Todd Petty =

American tennis coach

Coaching career (HC unless noted)
- 2008–2022: Texas Tech

Head coaching record
- Overall: 244–117

Todd Petty is an American tennis coach. He served as the head coach of Texas Tech Red Raiders women's tennis team. from 2008 to 2022. He replaced Cari Groce prior to the 2008–09 season. Petty finished his eleventh season in charge of the Texas Tech ladies' tennis program where he has guided the Lady Raiders to public unmistakable quality behind three Big 12 ordinary season titles, the program's first Big 12 competition title, five 20 or more win seasons, four NCAA Sweet 16 appearances and two NCAA Elite Eight offers. In 2019, he was raised to Director of Tennis at Texas Tech, instructing the ladies' group and regulating the men's tennis program too.

Petty is a three-time Big 12 Coach of the Year (2011, 2012, 2017) and three-time Wilson/ITA Texas Region Coach of the Year (2012, 2016, 2017). He has driven Texas Tech to program-long dash of eight-straight NCAA Tournament offers, and the Lady Raiders have scored an Oracle/ITA Top 25 last positioning during six of the last eight seasons.

Under his tutelage, the Lady Raiders completed the season in the Top 10 of every two of the last three seasons and came to as high as No. 5 in the nation.

Petty has 208 wins and a .695 prevailing upon rate his 11 seasons. Following the 2017 season, Petty outperformed Harrison "Mickey" Bowes vocation win all out of 156 wins (1980–89).

In July 2022, Petty resigned suddenly from the Texas Tech tennis program. It is unclear as to the circumstances surrounding his departure. Petty no longer coaches tennis professionally.
