= Sam Hurley =

American jumper and social media influencer

Personal information
- Born: September 1, 2003 (age 23) Fayetteville, Arkansas
- Education: University of Texas, Texas Tech
- Height: 6 ft 2 in (188 cm)

Sport
- Sport: High jump, pole vault
- University team: Texas Tech Red Raiders, formerly Texas Longhorns

Sam Hurley (born September 1, 2003) is an American social media influencer and jumper. He was a member of the Texas Tech Red Raiders from 2025 to 2026 and previously of the Texas Longhorns from 2021 to 2025. During his time as a college athlete, he was one of the highest-earning college athletes in the country. He began creating YouTube content at the age of 8.

== Biography ==
Hurley hails from Fayetteville, Arkansas to a mother who was a cheerleading team captain in college. His older brother, Hootie, is also a pole vaulter and social media influencer. He first began creating content on YouTube at the age of 8. For seven years, he did not receive much traction, but not long after his parents' divorce, he began creating content on TikTok, and in less than six months had a million followers. He also began competing in track and field at a young age: his first major win was at the Hershey Nationals in Chicago. He began using his content creation to fundraise for organizations like St. Jude Children's Research Hospital.

In March 2019, he posted that he would be at Times Square a few hours later, and was met by a crowd of hundreds of girls. According to his mother, the police subsequently told her that "he has started a riot". Later that summer, he went on a nationwide tour with Josh Richards, a fellow social media influencer.

Due to his social media content creation, he faced bullying in high school, and ultimately chose to complete the remainder of his schooling online. He continued to participate in the track and field team, though, and in the 2020–2021 cycle, as a junior, he received a Gatorade Player of the Year award for men's track and field in Arkansas. The same year, he won the state championships for high jump, pole vault, long jump, and decathlon and placed second in the hurdles.

He originally had not intended to attend college, instead becoming a full time influencer, but after National Collegiate Athletic Association v. Alston, he decided to attend college as he could also continue his social media. He became the only track-and-field athlete and one of only two non-football and non-basketball athletes to be in the top 100 of the NIL compensation. He was recruited by the University of Texas, and graduated a semester early to begin his first season doing track and field at Texas. During his time doing track and field at UT, he qualified for the NCAA National Track and Field Championship. During his junior year, however, he ripped his quadriceps multiple times and was unable to compete. He returned to it during his senior year.

In 2025, he transferred to Texas Tech University, where he spent his final year of college.

He is known for his success in both the high jump and the pole vault, an unusual combination. He says a prayer before every jump he performs.

He sells his own merch on social media, though he has alleged a popular shirt stating "Call Me Mrs. Hurley" is not his creation. He has stated one of his biggest motivations is to prove that he isn't just a TikToker. He has been dubbed the "face of college track".

He has also been dubbed "one of the most marketable college athletes in the world", and has promoted an assortment of brands, including Ralph Lauren, Jimmy Dean, TurboTax, Verizon, Amazon, Vuori, and Raising Cane's. He has also walked in New York Fashion Week.

He frequently posts videos and photos shirtless, which he has attributed to his Arkansas background, and has stated he doesn't usually feel objectified. However, he has stated he has been non-consensually groped by women in the past.

In February 2026, he posted an endorsement of James Talarico for U.S. senator. He had previously never posted any content that was politics-associated or political.

On July 13, 2026, Hurley announced on social media that he had graduated college and moved to Los Angeles, where he intended to work as a professional athlete. His intent is to go to the Olympics. He had previously qualified for the 2024 Olympic Trials.
