= Amy Suiter =

American softball player and coach

Current position
- Title: Head coach
- Team: Western Washington

Playing career
- 2000–2003: Washington

Coaching career (HC unless noted)
- 2004–2008: Texas Tech (assistant)
- 2008–2009: Texas Tech
- 2010–: Western Washington

Head coaching record
- Overall: 106–89

Amy Suiter (née Hanson) is an American softball coach. She is a former interim head coach of the Texas Tech Red Raiders softball team for the 2009 season. She formerly served as an assistant under head coach Teresa Wilson. She played college softball at the University of Washington. Suiter was relieved of her duties on May 18, 2009, and later replaced by Shanon Hays.

She is now currently the head coach of Western Washington University's softball team.
