= Chau-Chyun Chen =

Chau-Chyun Chen is an American engineer and a department of Chemical Engineering chairman at Texas Tech University.

== Education ==
In 1973, Chen received a B.S. degree in chemistry from National Taiwan University. In 1977, Chen received a M.S. degree in chemical engineering from Massachusetts Institute of Technology. In 1980, Chen received a Doctor of Science (D.Sc.) degree in chemical engineering from the Massachusetts Institute of Technology.

== Career ==
Chen is currently the Jack Maddox Distinguished Engineering Chair at Texas Tech University in Lubbock, Texas. Chen is also a published author of over 80 articles in technical journals. Chen is a member of the American Association for the Advancement of Science and American Chemical Society. Chen was also elected a member of the National Academy of Engineering in 2005 for contributions to molecular thermodynamics and process-modeling technology for designing industrial processes with complex chemical systems.
