= Linda and Terry Fuller Track =

Multi-use stadium in Lubbock, Texas

Coordinates: 33.587281°N 101.877524°W

Terry and Linda Fuller Track & Field Complex
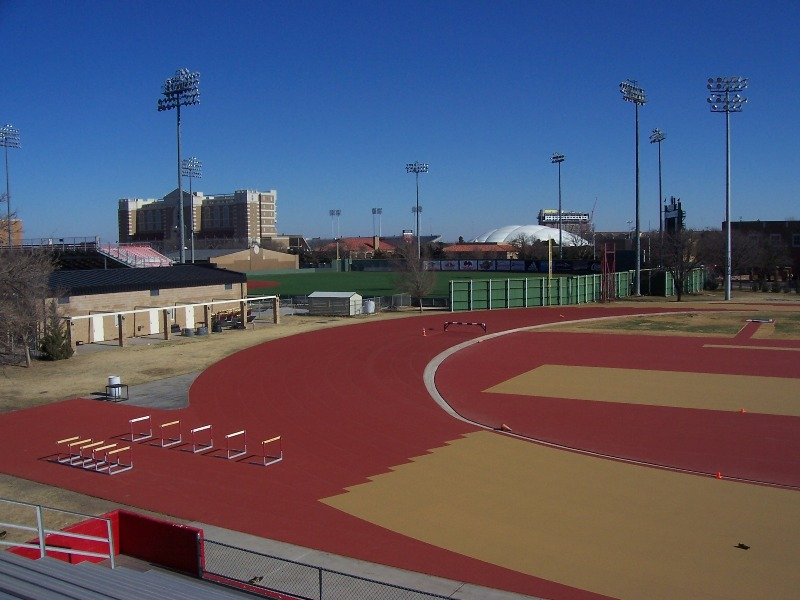
- Interactive map of Terry and Linda Fuller Track & Field Complex
- Location: Lubbock, Texas
- Owner: Texas Tech University
- Operator: Texas Tech University
- Capacity: 3,500

Tenant
- Texas Tech Red Raiders

Terry and Linda Fuller Track & Field Complex is a multi-use stadium in Lubbock, Texas on the campus of Texas Tech University where it serves as home to Red Raider track and field. Formerly, it was also the home of the women's soccer team before they moved to the John Walker Soccer Complex. The stadium seats 3,500.

== Usage ==
The 2013 Big 12 Conference Outdoor Track & Field Championship was hosted at the Terry and Linda Fuller Track & Field Complex on May 16–18, 2014.
