= Larry Hays =

American college sports coach

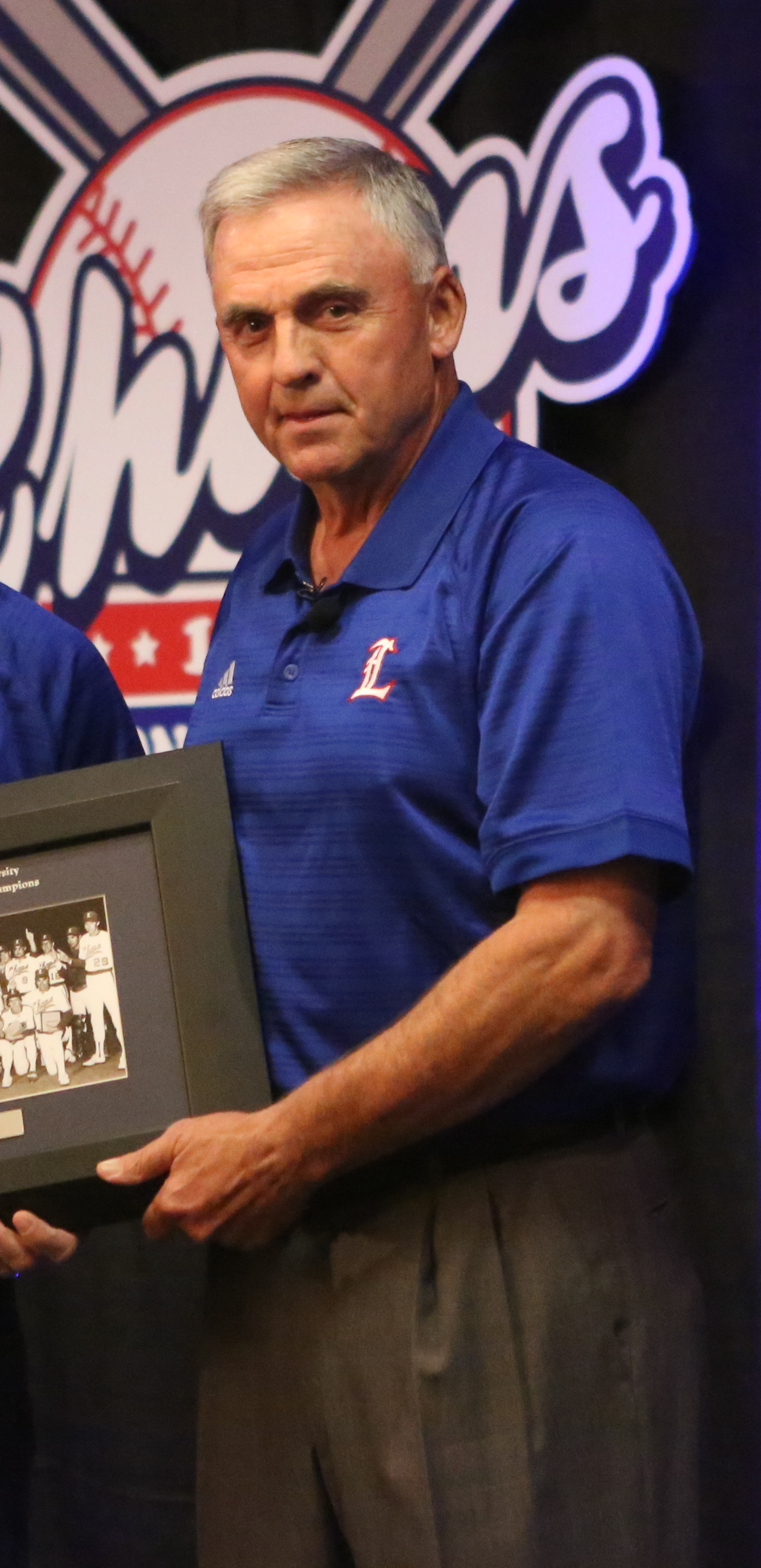
- Hays in 2013

Biographical details
- Born: Elida, New Mexico, U.S.

Coaching career (HC unless noted)

Baseball
- 1971–1986: Lubbock Christian
- 1987–2008: Texas Tech

Men's basketball
- 1969–1975: Lubbock Christian
- 1978–1980: Lubbock Christian

Women's basketball
- 1982–1983: Lubbock Christian

Softball
- 2010: Lubbock Christian

Administrative career (AD unless noted)
- 1979–1987: Lubbock Christian

Head coaching record
- Overall: 1,509–860 (Baseball); 113–137 (Men's basketball); 8–9 (Women's basketball); 54–7 (Softball)

Accomplishments and honors

Championships
- NAIA Baseball (1983); SWC Regular Season (1995); SWC Tournament (1995); Big 12 Regular Season (1997); Big 12 Tournament (1998); SAC Regular Season (2010)

Awards
- SWC Coach of the Year (1995); Big 12 Coach of the Year (1997); NAIA Hall of Fame inductee Texas Baseball Hall of Fame inductee
- College Baseball Hall of Fame; Inducted in 2015

Larry Hays is an American college baseball, basketball, and softball coach. He was the head baseball coach at Lubbock Christian University (LCU) (1971–1986) and Texas Tech University (1987–2008). He was also the head coach of the LCU Chaparrals basketball (1969–1975, 1978–1980), LCU Lady Chaps basketball (1982–83), LCU Lady Chaps softball (2010) teams and previously served as the LCU athletic director (1979–1987).

Under the leadership of Hays, the LCU Chaparrals baseball team won the National Association of Intercollegiate Athletics (NAIA) Baseball World Series in 1983.

== Early life ==
Hays was born in Elida, New Mexico, but went to school in Dora, where he played basketball and baseball in high school. He attended Lubbock Christian College and played for the men's basketball team while earning an Associates of Arts degree in 1964. He then attended Eastern New Mexico University (ENMU), in Portales, New Mexico, where he earned a Bachelors (1966) and master's degree (1969). As Hays put it, "I've always liked to say when I was at Eastern, that I averaged 30 a game. When I said that, people looked at me, and I would say '30 seconds, not 30 points."

== Coaching career ==
=== Lubbock Christian ===
Hays began his coaching career when he was hired as the assistant coach of the Lubbock Christian Chaparrals basketball team. He was promoted to head coach in 1969. When Lubbock Christian added baseball in 1971, Hays became the program's second head coach (he played on teams for LCC in the 1960s which were coached by Lester Perrin, the head basketball coach at the school at that time). He led the Chaparrals baseball team to an NAIA national championship in 1983. In the same season, he was, for a single season, the head women's basketball coach of the Lady Chaps. From 1979 until 1987, he was the university's athletic director.

Hays was the softball program's second head coach after his son, Shanon Hays, resigned to take the same position with the Texas Tech Red Raiders softball team. He was succeeded by his son Daren Hays, after a single season as the Lady Chaps' head coach in 2010.

=== Texas Tech ===
Hays became the head baseball coach of the Texas Tech Red Raiders in 1987. He led the Red Raiders to two SWC championships, two Big 12 championships and nine NCAA tournament appearances and posted a winning season in every year but his first and last. In 2005, he became the fourth coach ever to gain 1,400 wins. On April 2, 2008, Hays became just the fourth coach in NCAA baseball history to win 1,500 games, 805 with the Red Raiders, with a 10–5 win over Texas A&M-Corpus Christi in his 22nd year as Texas Tech's head coach. On June 2, 2008, Hays retired from coaching after 38 years, 22 of which were spent at Texas Tech. His final record stands at 1,509 wins and 860 losses, fourth all-time in NCAA history. He will remain on the Tech staff in a developmental role. Hays's No. 27 jersey was retired on March 23, 2009. Ceremonies were held at Dan Law Field before the Texas Tech Red Raiders game against the Lubbock Christian Chaparrals. Texas Tech won the game 4–3.

== Head coaching record ==
=== Baseball ===
Record table
Season	Team	Overall	Conference	Standing	Postseason
Lubbock Christian Chaparrals (1971–1986)
1971	Lubbock Christian	28–16			
1972	Lubbock Christian	31–14			
1973	Lubbock Christian	35–14			
1974	Lubbock Christian	41–17			
1975	Lubbock Christian	36–24			
1976	Lubbock Christian	49–17			
1977	Lubbock Christian	44–27			
1978	Lubbock Christian	47–24			
1979	Lubbock Christian	42–24			
1980	Lubbock Christian	54–34			
1981	Lubbock Christian	38–40			
1982	Lubbock Christian	64–21			
1983	Lubbock Christian	56–27			NAIA Champions
1984	Lubbock Christian	51–14			
1985	Lubbock Christian	38–29			
1986	Lubbock Christian	41–39			
Lubbock Christian:		695–381			
Texas Tech Red Raiders (Southwest Conference) (1987–1996)
1987	Texas Tech	21–28	7–14	6th	
1988	Texas Tech	34–25–1	7–14	6th	
1989	Texas Tech	32–22	9–12	T–4th	
1990	Texas Tech	31–29	6–16	7th	
1991	Texas Tech	42–18	9–12	7th	
1992	Texas Tech	29–25	15–19	4th	
1993	Texas Tech	43–15	11–7	T–2nd	
1994	Texas Tech	40–17	12–6	T–2nd	
1995	Texas Tech	51–14	16–8	1st	NCAA Regional
1996	Texas Tech	49–15	15–9	2nd	NCAA Regional
Texas Tech Red Raiders (Big 12 Conference) (1997–2008)
1997	Texas Tech	46–14	23–7	1st	NCAA Regional
1998	Texas Tech	44–20	18–11	3rd	NCAA Regional
1999	Texas Tech	42–17	18–8	3rd	NCAA Regional
2000	Texas Tech	36–26	18–12	5th	NCAA Regional
2001	Texas Tech	43–20–1	19–10–1	2nd	NCAA Regional
2002	Texas Tech	42–20	16–11	2nd	NCAA Regional
2003	Texas Tech	30–25	8–18	9th	
2004	Texas Tech	40–21	17–9	3rd	NCAA Regional
2005	Texas Tech	34–25	9–16	8th	
2006	Texas Tech	31–26–1	9–16–1	8th	
2007	Texas Tech	28–27	8–18	10th	
2008	Texas Tech	25–30	9–18	T–9th	
Texas Tech:		813–479–3	278–271–2		
Total:		1,508–860–3			
National champion Postseason invitational champion Conference regular season champion Conference regular season and conference tournament champion Division regular season champion Division regular season and conference tournament champion Conference tournament champion

=== Men's basketball ===
Record table
Season	Team	Overall	Conference	Standing	Postseason
Lubbock Christian Chaparrals (1969–1975)
1969–70	Lubbock Christian	26–11			NJCAA Regional
1970–71	Lubbock Christian	16–14			
1971–72	Lubbock Christian	8–20			
1972–73	Lubbock Christian	12–20			
1973–74	Lubbock Christian	10–21			
1974–75	Lubbock Christian	10–19			
Lubbock Christian Chaparrals (1978–1980)
1978–79	Lubbock Christian	14–16			
1979–80	Lubbock Christian	17–16			
Lubbock Christian:		113–137			
Total:		113–137			
National champion Postseason invitational champion Conference regular season champion Conference regular season and conference tournament champion Division regular season champion Division regular season and conference tournament champion Conference tournament champion

=== Women's basketball ===
Record table
Season	Team	Overall	Conference	Standing	Postseason
Lubbock Christian Lady Chaps (1982–83)
1982–83	Lubbock Christian	8–9			
Lubbock Christian:		8–9			
Total:		8–9			
National champion Postseason invitational champion Conference regular season champion Conference regular season and conference tournament champion Division regular season champion Division regular season and conference tournament champion Conference tournament champion

=== Softball ===
Record table
Season	Team	Overall	Conference	Standing	Postseason
Lubbock Christian Lady Chaps (2010)
2010	Lubbock Christian	54–7	29–3	1st	NAIA Tournament
Lubbock Christian:		54–7	29–3		
Total:		54–7			
National champion Postseason invitational champion Conference regular season champion Conference regular season and conference tournament champion Division regular season champion Division regular season and conference tournament champion Conference tournament champion

== See also ==
- List of college baseball career coaching wins leaders
