= List of law schools in Texas =

This is a list of law schools in Texas, with U.S. News & World Report rankings for 2021.

Law School	Affiliation	Location	Founded	Closed	Rank	References
Baylor Law School	Baylor University	Waco	1849	1883–1920	50	
Dedman School of Law	Southern Methodist University	Dallas	1925		56	(Note: Formerly known as Southern Methodist University School of Law (1925–2001))
University of Houston Law Center	University of Houston	Houston	1947		56	
Jefferson Law School		Dallas	1919	1937	N/A	
South Texas College of Law		Houston	1923		148-194	
St. Mary's University School of Law	St. Mary's University	San Antonio	1927		148-194	(Note: Formerly known as the San Antonio School of Law (1927–1934))
University of Texas School of Law	University of Texas at Austin	Austin	1883		16	
Texas A&M University School of Law	Texas A&M University	Fort Worth	1989		60	(Note: Formerly known as Dallas/Fort Worth School of Law (1989–1992), and Texas Wesleyan University School of Law (1992–2013)) (Note: Formerly affiliated with Texas Wesleyan University) (Note: Formerly located in Irving (1989–1992))
Texas Tech University School of Law	Texas Tech University	Lubbock	1967		111	
Thurgood Marshall School of Law	Texas Southern University	Houston	1946		148-194	
University of North Texas at Dallas College of Law	University of North Texas at Dallas	Dallas	2009		Unranked	(Note: Formerly affiliated with University of North Texas System (2014–15))
