= List of Phi Delta Phi chapters =

Phi Delta Phi is an international legal honor society and the oldest legal organization in continuous existence in the United States. Its chapters at law schools are called inns, derived from the English Inns of Court. Its pre-law undergraduate chapters are called halls.

== Inns ==
Each inn is named for a noted jurist or member of the bar. In the following list, active inns are indicated in bold and inactive inns are in italics.

Inn	Charter date and range	Institution	Location	Status	Ref.
**Kent**	1869	University of Michigan Law School	Ann Arbor, Michigan	Active	
Benjamin	1878–1928	Illinois Wesleyan University	Bloomington, Illinois	Inactive	
**Booth**	1880	Northwestern University School of Law	Evanston, Illinois	Active	
**Story**	1881–1913, 1922	Columbia Law School	New York City, New York	Active	
**Cooley**	1882	Washington University School of Law	St. Louis, Missouri	Active	
**Pomeroy**	1883	University of California College of the Law, San Francisco	San Francisco, California	Active	(Note: Chapter formed at the University of California, Hastings College of the Law (abbreviated as UC Hastings) which became the University of California College of the Law, San Francisco in 2023.)
**Jay**	1884–1912, xxxx ?	Albany Law School	Albany, New York	Active	
**John Marshall**	1884	George Washington University	Washington, D.C.	Active	
**Webster**	1885–1956, xxxx ?	Boston University School of Law	Boston, Massachusetts	Active	
**Hamilton**	1886–1925, 1927	University of Cincinnati College of Law	Cincinnati, Ohio	Active	
**Gibson-Alexander**	1886–1934, xxxx ?	University of Pennsylvania Law School	Philadelphia, Pennsylvania	Active	
**Choate**	1887–1909, xxxx ?	Harvard Law School	Cambridge, Massachusetts	Active	
**Waite**	1887	Yale University	New Haven, Connecticut	Active	
**Field**	1888	New York University School of Law	Manhattan, New York City, New York	Active	
**Conckling**	1888	Cornell Law School	Ithaca, New York	Active	
**Tiedeman**	1890	University of Missouri School of Law	Columbia, Missouri	Active	
Minor	1890	University of Virginia School of Law	Charlottesville, Virginia	Inactive	(Note: Chapter created and became synonymous with the University of Virginia Libel Show, a yearly live variety show which continues today.)
**Dillon**	1890	University of Minnesota Law School	Minneapolis, Minnesota	Active	
**Daniels**	1891–1942, xxxx ?	University at Buffalo Law School	Amherst, New York	Active	
**Chase**	1891	University of Oregon School of Law	Eugene, Oregon	Active	
**Harlan**	1891	University of Wisconsin Law School	Madison, Wisconsin	Active	
**Swan**	1893	Ohio State University Moritz College of Law	Columbus, Ohio	Active	
**McClain**	1893	University of Iowa College of Law	Iowa City, Iowa	Active	
**Lincoln**	1895	University of Nebraska College of Law	Lincoln, Nebraska	Active	
**Osgoode**	1896–1899, 1909	Osgoode Hall Law School	Toronto, Ontario	Active	
**Fuller**	1896	Chicago-Kent College of Law	Chicago, Illinois	Active	
**Miller**	1897	Stanford University	Stanford, California	Active	
**Green**	1897	University of Kansas School of Law	Lawrence, Kansas	Active	
**Comstock**	1898	Syracuse University College of Law	Syracuse, New York	Active	
**Dwight**	1899	New York Law School	New York City, New York	Active	
**Foster**	1900	Indiana University Maurer School of Law	Bloomington, Indiana	Active	
**Ranney**	1901	Case Western Reserve University School of Law	Cleveland, Ohio	Active	
**Langdell**	1901	University of Illinois College of Law	Champaign, Illinois	Active	
**Brewer**	1902	University of Denver Sturm College of Law	Denver, Colorado	Active	
**Douglas**	1903–1942, 1957	University of Chicago Law School	Chicago, Illinois	Active	
**Ballinger**	1907	University of Washington School of Law	Seattle, Washington	Active	
**Malone**	1907	Vanderbilt University Law School	Nashville, Tennessee	Active	
Evarts	1907	St. Lawrence University	Canton, New York	Inactive	
**Thomas**	1907	University of Colorado Law School	Boulder, Colorado	Active	
**Beatty**	1907	USC Gould School of Law	Los Angeles, California	Active	
**Reed**	1908–1919, xxxx ?	University of Maine School of Law	Portland, Maine	Active	
**Tucker**	1908	Washington and Lee University School of Law	Lexington, Virginia	Active	
**Shiras**	1909–1959, xxxx ?	University of Pittsburgh School of Law	Pittsburgh, Pennsylvania	Active	
**Roberts**	1909	University of Texas School of Law	Austin, Texas	Active	
**Holmes**	1912	University of Oklahoma College of Law	Norman, Oklahoma	Active	
**Bruce**	1912	University of North Dakota School of Law	Grand Forks, North Dakota	Active	
**Ames**	1912	University of South Dakota School of Law	Vermillion, South Dakota	Active	
**White**	1912	Tulane University Law School	New Orleans, Louisiana	Active	
**Jones**	1913	UC Berkeley School of Law	Berkeley, California	Active	
**Cockrell**	1920	University of Florida Levin College of Law	Gainesville, Florida	Active	
**Vance**	1920	University of North Carolina School of Law	Chapel Hill, North Carolina	Active	
**Roosevelt**	1920	University of Tennessee College of Law	Knoxville, Tennessee	Active	
**Brooke**	1922	West Virginia University College of Law	Morgantown, West Virginia	Active	
**Clayberg**	1922	University of Montana School of Law	Missoula, Montana	Active	
**Wilson**	1922	University of Georgia School of Law	Athens, Georgia	Active	
**deGraffenried**	1922	University of Alabama	Tuscaloosa, Alabama	Active	
**Lamar**	1924	Emory University School of Law	Atlanta, Georgia	Active	
**Breckinridge**	1925	University of Kentucky College of Law	Lexington, Kentucky	Active	
**Weldon**	1926–1940, xxxx ?	Schulich School of Law	Halifax, Nova Scotia, Canada	Active	
**Martin**	1927	Paul M. Hebert Law Center and Louisiana State University	Baton Rouge, Louisiana	Active	
**Mayes**	1927	University of Mississippi School of Law	Oxford, Mississippi	Active	
**Jean Galloway Bissell**	1927	University of South Carolina School of Law	Columbia, South Carolina	Active	(Note: Originally called the Calhoun Inn.)
**Pattee**	1929	University of Arizona	Tucson, Arizona	Active	
**Hughes**	1931	Duke University School of Law	Durham, North Carolina	Active	
**Taft**	1931	St. John's University School of Law	Jamaica, Queens, New York City, New York	Active	
**Aggeler**	1937	Loyola Law School	Los Angeles, California	Active	
**Conwell**	1937	Temple University Beasley School of Law	Philadelphia, Pennsylvania	Active	
**Powell**	1942	University of Missouri–Kansas City School of Law	Kansas City, Missouri	Active	
**McNary**	1947	Willamette University College of Law	Salem, Oregon	Active	
**Johnson**	1947	University of Utah College of Law	Salt Lake City, Utah	Active	
**Scott**	1947	Georgetown University	Washington, D.C.	Active	
**Bryan**	1947	University of Miami School of Law	Coral Gables, Florida	Active	
**Willkie**	1947	Indiana University Robert H. McKinney School of Law	Indianapolis, Indiana	Active	
**Ruffin**	1947	Wake Forest University School of Law	Winston-Salem, North Carolina	Active	
**Cardozo**	1947	Stetson University College of Law	Gulfport, Florida	Active	
**Murphy**	1949	Saint Louis University School of Law	St. Louis, Missouri	Active	
**Hemphill**	1949	Baylor Law School	Waco, Texas	Active	
**Tarlton**	1949	St. Mary's University School of Law	San Antonio, Texas	Active	
**Beasley**	1950	Rutgers Law School, Newark	Newark, New Jersey	Active	
**Pound**	1951	UCLA School of Law	Los Angeles, California	Active	
**Hutcheson**	1953	University of Houston Law Center	Houston, Texas	Active	
**Stone**	1957	Marquette University Law School	Milwaukee, Wisconsin	Active	
**Stephens**	1959	University of San Francisco School of Law	San Francisco, California	Active	
**Rogers**	1959	University of Tulsa College of Law	Tulsa, Oklahoma	Active	
**Monteith**	1959	Southern Methodist University Dedman School of Law	Dallas, Texas	Active	
**Learned Hand**	1961	Oklahoma City University School of Law	Oklahoma City, Oklahoma	Active	
**Wigmore**	1962	University of San Diego School of Law	San Diego, California	Active	
**George**	1964	Mercer University School of Law	Macon, Georgia	Active	
**Jefferson**	1965	William & Mary Law School	Williamsburg, Virginia	Active	
**Stevenson**	1968	University of Memphis School of Law	Memphis, Tennessee	Active	
**Shields**	1969	University of the Pacific, McGeorge School of Law	Sacramento, California	Active	
**McFarland**	1971	Arizona State University	Tempe, Arizona	Active	
**Black**	1972	Loyola University New Orleans College of Law	New Orleans, Louisiana	Active	
**Velasco**	1973	Escuela Libre de Derecho	Mexico City, Mexico	Active	
**Landon**	1974	Washburn University School of Law	Topeka, Kansas	Active	
**Santos Theriot**	1975	University of Monterrey	Nuevo Leon, Mexico	Active	
**Ford**	1976	Vermont Law and Graduate School	South Royalton, Vermont	Active	
**Rehnquist**	1976	Suffolk University Law School	Boston, Massachusetts	Active	
**Stevens**	1976	University of Illinois Chicago School of Law	Chicago, Illinois	Active	
**Earl Warren**	1976	Texas Tech University School of Law	Lubbock, Texas	Active	
**Bryant**	1977	Howard University School of Law	Washington, D.C.	Active	
**Moynihan**	1977	Boston College Law School	Newton, Massachusetts	Active	
**Cox**	1978	Western New England University School of Law	Springfield, Massachusetts	Active	
**Recasens Siches**	1978	Universidad Anáhuac México Norte	Huixquilucan de Degollado, State of Mexico, Mexico	Active	
**Sutherland**	1979	Brigham Young University Law School	Provo, Utah	Active	
**Rand**	1979	University of Western Ontario Faculty of Law	London, Ontario, Canada	Active	
**S. J. Field**	1979	Pepperdine University School of Law	Malibu, California	Active	
**Harrington**	1981	Widener University Delaware Law School	Wilmington, Delaware	Active	
**Wood**	1982	South Texas College of Law Houston	Houston, Texas	Active	
**Carroll**	1983	University of Baltimore School of Law	Baltimore, Maryland	Active	
**Martland**	1983	University of Ottawa Faculty of Law	Ottawa, Ontario, Canada	Active	
**Keady**	1985	Mississippi College School of Law	Jackson, Mississippi	Active	
**Deady**	1987	Lewis & Clark Law School	Portland, Oregon	Active	
Villoro Toronzo	1987	Universidad Iberoamericana	Santa Fe, Mexico City, Mexico	Inactive	
**Lesar**	1987	Southern Illinois University School of Law	Carbondale, Illinois	Active	
**Burns**	1988	Quinnipiac University School of Law	North Haven, Connecticut	Active	
**Palacios Macedo**	1988	Instituto Tecnológico Autónomo de México	Mexico City, Mexico	Active	
**Guerrero**	1988	Universidad La Salle México	Mexico	Active	
**Salinas-Martinez**	1989	Facultad Libre de Derecho de Monterrey	Santa Catarina, Nuevo León, Mexico	Active	
**García Rendón**	1989	Tecnológico de Monterrey, Campus Monterrey	Monterrey, Mexico	Active	
**Borja Soriano**	1989	Panamerican University	Mexico City, Mexico	Active	
**Mash**	1990	Golden Gate University School of Law	San Francisco, California	Active	
**Herrera y Lasso**	1991	Universidad Anáhuac México Campus Sur	Mexico City, Mexico	Active	
**Rojina-Villegas**	1991	Universidad Intercontinental	Mexico City, Mexico	Active	
**Paca**	1992	University of Maryland Francis King Carey School of Law	Baltimore, Maryland	Active	
**Maher**	1993	Western Michigan University Cooley Law School	Lansing, Michigan	Active	
Mitchell	1993	William Mitchell College of Law	Saint Paul, Minnesota	Inactive	
**Rosen**	1993	University of Akron School of Law	Akron, Ohio	Active	
**Lafragua**	1995	Universidad de las Américas Puebla	San Andrés Cholula, Puebla, Mexico	Active	
**Elliott**	1995	Texas A&M University School of Law	Fort Worth, Texas	Active	
**Cabrera**	1997	Universidad Iberoamericana Puebla	San Andrés Cholula, Puebla, Mexico	Active	
**Mazpulez Perez**	2000	Tecnológico de Monterrey, Campus Chihuahua	Chihuahua City, Mexico	Active	
**John McClellan Marshall**	2000	Maria Curie-Skłodowska University	Lublin, Poland	Active	
**McLachlin**	2001	University of British Columbia Peter A. Allard School of Law	Vancouver, British Columbia, Canada	Active	
**Bradlee**	2001	New England Law Boston	Boston, Massachusetts	Active	
**Mosk**	2002	Chapman University School of Law	Orange, California	Active	
**Blackwell**	2003	Appalachian School of Law	Grundy, Virginia	Active	
**Ayala Villarreal**	2003	Autonomous University of Nuevo León	Nuevo Leon, Mexico	Active	
Góngora Pimentel	2005	Universidad Contemporanea	Querétaro, Mexico	Inactive	
**Santamaría**	2005	Universidad Juarez Autonoma Tabasco	Villahermosa, Tabasco, Mexico	Active	
**Mariano Otero**	2006	Tecnológico de Monterrey, Campus Guadalajara	Guadalajara, Mexico	Active	
**Karsten Schmidt**	2006	Bucerius Law School	Hamburg, Germany	Active	
**Burgoa**	2007	Tecnológico de Monterrey, Campus Estado de México	State of Mexico, Mexico	Active	
**John Reed**	2007	Penn State Dickinson Law	Carlisle, Pennsylvania	Active	
**Richard von Weizsäcker**	2008	University of Tübingen	Tübingen, Germany	Active	
**Hauriou**	2010	Tecnológico de Monterrey, Campus Puebla	Puebla, Mexico	Active	
**Castor**	2013	Cooley Law School, Tampa Bay Campus	Riverview, Florida	Active	
**Rafael Villar Calvo**	2013	Tecnológico de Monterrey, Campus Toluca	Toluca, Mexico	Active	
**Michael Hoffmann-Becking**	2013	Goethe University Frankfurt	Frankfurt, Germany	Active	
**Cruz Miramontes**	2017	Autonomous University of Chihuahua	Chihuahua, Chihuahua, Mexico	Active	
**Alejandro Rivera Cano**		Universidad del Valle de México, Lomas Verdes	Lomas Verdes, Mexico	Active	
**Amaker**		Loyola University Chicago School of Law	Chicago, Illinois	Active	
**Anstead**		Florida International University College of Law	Miami, Florida	Active	
**Bauer**		DePaul University College of Law	Chicago, Illinois	Active	
**Blackstone**		Nova Southeastern University Shepard Broad College of Law	Davie, Florida	Active	
**Blanco Lugo**		University of Puerto Rico School of Law	Río Piedras, Puerto Rico	Active	
**Boyle**		Wayne State University Law School	Detroit, Michigan	Active	
**Brandeis**		California Western School of Law	San Diego, California	Active	
**Brennan**		Gonzaga University School of Law	Spokane, Washington	Active	
**Cajica Camacho**		Escuela Libre de Derecho of Puebla	Puebla, Mexico	Active	
**Carl H. Moultrie**		University of the District of Columbia School of Law	Washington, D.C.	Active	
**Campbell**		Michigan State University College of Law	East Lansing, Michigan	Active	
**Contemporanea**		Universidad Mondragón UCO, Campus Querétaro	Querétaro, Querétaro, Mexico	Active	
**Cossío Díaz**		Benemérita Universidad Autónoma de Puebla	Puebla, Mexico	Active	
**Creighton**		Creighton University School of Law	Omaha, Nebraska	Active	
**Dickson**		University of Manitoba, Faculty of Law	Winnipeg, Manitoba, Canada	Active	
**Ellsworth**		University of Connecticut School of Law	Hartford, Connecticut	Active	
**Evarts**		Brooklyn Law School	New York City, New York	Active	
**Freedman**		Maurice A. Deane School of Law Hofstra University	Hempstead, New York	Active	
**Friendly**		Fordham University School of Law	Manhattan, New York	Active	
**Fulbright**		University of Arkansas at Little Rock School of Law	Little Rock, Arkansas	Active	
**Galvez**		Universidad Mariano Gálvez	Guatemala City, Guatemala	Active	
**García Cárdenas**		Universidad Autónoma de Coahuila, Unidad Saltillo	Saltillo, Coahuila, Mexico	Active	
**George**		Georgia State University College of Law	Atlanta, Georgia	Active	
**Gibson**		UC Davis School of Law	Davis, California	Active	
**Hans-Jürgen Papier**		LMU Munich	Munich, Germany	Active	
**Hargest**		Widener University Commonwealth Law School	Harrisburg, Pennsylvania	Active	
**Holderman**		Northern Illinois University College of Law	Chicago, Illinois	Active	
**Idaho**		University of Idaho College of Law	Moscow, Idaho	Active	
**J. F. Kennedy**		American University Washington College of Law	Washington, D.C.	Active	
**Javits**		Benjamin N. Cardozo School of Law Yeshiva University	New York City, New York	Active	
**Jaworski**		Columbus School of Law, Catholic University of America	Washington, D.C.	Active	
**Kazimierz Wielki**		Kozminski University	Warsaw, Poland	Active	
**King**		Texas Southern University Thurgood Marshall School of Law	Houston, Texas	Active	
**L. F. Powell**		George Mason University Antonin Scalia Law School	Arlington, Virginia	Active	
**Ladd**		Florida State University College of Law	Tallahassee, Florida	Active	
**Lander**		Seattle University School of Law	Seattle, Washington	Active	
**Landivar**		Rafael Landívar University	Guatemala City, Guatemala	Active	
**Laskin**		University of Toronto Faculty of Law	Toronto, Ontario, Canada	Active	
**Latimer**		Mitchell Hamline School of Law	Saint Paul, Minnesota	Active	
**Laurier**		McGill University Faculty of Law	Montreal, Quebec, Canada	Active	
**Leflar**		University of Arkansas School of Law	Fayetteville, Arkansas	Active	
**Lukowsky**		Northern Kentucky University Salmon P. Chase College of Law	Highland Heights, Kentucky	Active	
**Luna Ramos**		Universidad Regiomontana	Monterrey, Nuevo León, Mexico	Active	
**Madison**		University of Richmond School of Law	Richmond, Virginia	Active	
**Marroquin**		Universidad Francisco Marroquín	Guatemala City, Guatemala	Active	
**McClintock**		University of Alberta Faculty of Law	Edmonton, Alberta, Canada	Active	
**McClintock**		University of Wyoming College of Law	Laramie, Wyoming	Active	
**More**		Notre Dame Law School	Notre Dame, Indiana	Active	
**O'Connor**		Villanova University School of Law	Villanova, Pennsylvania	Active	
**Pérez Dayán**		Universidad Anáhuac Puebla	San Andrés Cholula, Puebla, Mexico	Active	
**Paul Johann Anselm von Feuerbach**		Friedrich Schiller University of Jena	Jena, Germany	Active	
**Paul Kirchhof**		Heidelberg University	Heidelberg, Baden-Württemberg, Germany	Active	
**Paul Martin**		University of Windsor Faculty of Law	Windsor, Ontario, Canada	Active	
**Pinckney**		Charleston School of Law	Charleston, South Carolina	Active	
**Quetzaltenango**		Universidad Quetzaltenango	Quetzaltenango, Guatemala	Active	
**Richardson**		University of Hawaiʻi at Mānoa William S. Richardson School of Law	Honolulu, Hawaii	Active	
**Roberts**		University of North Texas at Dallas College of Law	Dallas, Texas	Active	
**Robinson**		Cumberland School of Law	Homewood, Alabama	Active	
**Rudolf Rengier**		University of Münster	Münster, North Rhine-Westphalia, Germany	Active	
**Scalia**		Ohio Northern University College of Law	Ada, Ohio	Active	
**Shenk**		Southwestern Law School	Los Angeles, California	Active	
**Sosa**		University of New Mexico School of Law	Albuquerque, New Mexico	Active	
**Stewart**		University of Dayton School of Law	Dayton, Ohio	Active	
**T. R. Brennan**		Thomas R. Kline School of Law of Duquesne University	Pittsburgh, Pennsylvania	Active	
**Thurgood Marshall**		Tuoro Law Center	Central Islip, New York	Active	
**Titone**		CUNY School of Law	New York City, New York	Active	
**Turner**		North Carolina Central University School of Law	Durham, North Carolina	Active	
**Udo Di Fabio**		University of Konstanz	Konstanz, Germany	Active	
**Villoro Toranzo**		Universidad Iberoamericana Santa Fe	Santa Fe, Mexico City, Mexico	Active	
**Whiteside**		Capital University Law School	Columbus, Ohio	Active	

== Halls ==
Following is a list of undergraduate pre-law chapters or halls.

Hall	Charter date and range	Institution	Locations	Status	Ref.
	2019	Andrews University	Berrien Springs, Michigan	Active	
		Azusa Pacific University	Azusa, California	Active	
		California State Polytechnic University, Pomona	Pomona, California	Active	
CSUF		California State University, Fullerton	Fullerton, California	Active	
		College of Charleston	Charleston, South Carolina	Active	
		College of William & Mary	Williamsburg, Virginia	Active	
Elmira	2018	Elmira College	Elmira, New York	Active	
FIU		Florida International University	University Park, Florida	Active	
		Gallaudet University	Washington, D.C.	Active	
		Hampton University	Hampton, Virginia	Active	
		Lamar University	Beaumont, Texas	Active	
		Lincoln University		Active	
LMU		Loyola Marymount University	Los Angeles, California	Active	
		Loyola University Chicago	Chicago, Illinois	Active	
Belva Lockwood	2016	Niagara University	Lewiston, New York	Active	
		Northern Illinois University	DeKalb, Illinois	Active	
		Pennsylvania State University	State College, Pennsylvania	Active	
		Pre-Law Society		Active	
		Soka University of America	Aliso Viejo, California	Active	
	2019	Texas A&M University–Texarkana	Texarkana, Texas	Active	
		Texas State University	San Marcos, Texas	Active	
		Thomas Jefferson University	Philadelphia, Pennsylvania	Active	
		University of British Columbia	Vancouver, British Columbia, Canada	Active	
		University of Central Florida	Orlando, Florida	Active	
Illini	2020	University of Illinois Urbana-Champaign	Urbana, Illinois	Active	
		University of Michigan	Ann Arbor, Michigan	Active	
		University of Mississippi	Oxford, Mississippi	Active	
		University of New Mexico	Albuquerque, New Mexico	Active	
		University of Richmond	Richmond, Virginia	Active	
		University of South Carolina	Columbia, South Carolina	Active	
		University of Texas at Austin	Austin, Texas	Active	
		Virginia Commonwealth University	Richmond, Virginia	Active	
		Virginia Military Institute	Lexington, Virginia	Active	
		Virginia Tech	Blacksburg, Virginia	Active	
		Washington State University	Pullman, Washington	Active	
		Washington University in St. Louis	St. Louis, Missouri	Active	
		Wellesley College	Wellesley, Massachusetts	Active	
