= List of Order of the Coif chapters =

American law honor society chapters

The Order of the Coif is an American honor society for law school graduates. The Order was founded in 1902 at the University of Illinois College of Law. Following is a list of chapters of Order of the Coif.

Charter date	Institution	Location	Status	Ref.
1902	University of Illinois College of Law	Champaign, Illinois	Active	
1904	University of Nebraska College of Law	Lincoln, Nebraska	Active	
1906	University of Missouri School of Law	Columbia, Missouri	Active	
1907	Northwestern University Pritzker School of Law	Chicago, Illinois	Active	
1908	University of Wisconsin Law School	Madison, Wisconsin	Active	
1909	University of Virginia School of Law	Charlottesville, Virginia	Active	
1911	University of Iowa College of Law	Iowa City, Iowa	Active	
1911	University of Michigan Law School	Ann Arbor, Michigan	Active	
1912	Case Western Reserve University School of Law	Cleveland, Ohio	Active	
1912	University of Chicago Law School	Chicago, Illinois	Active	
1912	University of Pennsylvania Law School	Philadelphia, Pennsylvania	Active	
1912	University of Pittsburgh School of Law	Pittsburgh, Pennsylvania	Active	
1912	Stanford Law School	Stanford, California	Active	
1915	Cornell Law School	Ithaca, New York	Active	
1915	University of Minnesota Law School	Minneapolis, Minnesota	Active	
1915	Ohio State University Moritz College of Law	Columbus, Ohio	Active	
1919	Yale Law School	New Haven, Connecticut	Active	
1924	University of Kansas School of Law	Lawrence, Kansas	Active	
1924	University of Washington School of Law	Seattle, Washington	Active	
1924	Washington University School of Law	St. Louis, Missouri.	Active	
1925	Indiana University Maurer School of Law	Bloomington, Indiana	Active	
1925	University of North Dakota School of Law	Grand Forks, North Dakota	Active	
1925	University of Oklahoma College of Law	Norman, Oklahoma	Active	
1925	West Virginia University College of Law	Morgantown, West Virginia	Active	
1926	George Washington University Law School	Washington, D.C.	Active	
1926	University of Texas School of Law	Austin, Texas	Active	
1927	University of California, Berkeley School of Law	Berkeley, California	Active	
1928	University of Cincinnati College of Law	Cincinnati, Ohio	Active	
1928	University of North Carolina School of Law	Chapel Hill, North Carolina	Active	
1929	University of Southern California Gould School of Law	Los Angeles, California	Active	
1931	University of Kentucky College of Law	Lexington, Kentucky	Active	
1931	Tulane University Law School	New Orleans, Louisiana	Active	
1933	Duke University School of Law	Durham, North Carolina	Active	
1934	University of Oregon School of Law	Eugene, Oregon	Active	
1938	University of Maryland Francis King Carey School of Law	Baltimore, Maryland	Active	
1942	University of Colorado Law School	Boulder, Colorado	Active	
1942	Paul M. Hebert Law Center	Baton Rouge, Louisiana	Active	
1948	Vanderbilt University Law School	Nashville, Tennessee	Active	
1950	Washington and Lee University School of Law	Lexington, Virginia	Active	
1951	University of Tennessee College of Law	Knoxville, Tennessee	Active	
1952	Drake University Law School	Des Moines, Iowa	Active	
1952	Syracuse University College of Law	Syracuse, New York	Active	
1953	S.J. Quinney College of Law	Salt Lake City, Utah	Active	
1954	University of California Hastings College of Law	San Francisco, California	Active	
1954	University of California, Los Angeles School of Law	Los Angeles, California	Active	
1955	University of Florida College of Law	Gainesville, Florida	Active	
1959	New York University School of Law	Manhattan, New York City, New York	Active	
1961	Villanova University School of Law	Villanova, Pennsylvania	Active	
1964	Boston College Law School	Newton, Massachusetts	Active	
1966	Southern Methodist University Dedman School of Law	Dallas, Texas	Active	
1969	University of Alabama School of Law	Tuscaloosa, Alabama	Active	
1969	James E. Rogers College of Law	Tucson, Arizona	Active	
1971	Emory University School of Law	Atlanta, Georgia	Active	
1971	University of New Mexico School of Law	Albuquerque, New Mexico	Active	
1972	University of California, Davis School of Law	Davis, California	Active	
1974	Texas Tech University School of Law	Lubbock, Texas	Active	
1977	University of Georgia School of Law	Athens, Georgia	Active	
1979	Florida State University College of Law	Tallahassee, Florida	Active	
1981	William & Mary Law School	Williamsburg, Virginia	Active	
1982	University of the Pacific, McGeorge School of Law	Sacramento, California	Active	
1982	University of South Carolina School of Law	Columbia, South Carolina	Active	
1983	University of Houston Law Center	Houston, Texas	Active	
1984	Sandra Day O'Connor College of Law	Phoenix, Arizona	Active	
1984	Brigham Young University Law School	Provo, Utah	Active	
1984	University of Toledo College of Law	Toledo, Ohio	Active	
1984	Wayne State University Law School	Detroit, Michigan	Active	
1985	University of Wyoming College of Law	Laramie, Wyoming	Active	
1988	Georgetown University Law Center	Washington, D.C.	Active	
1989	Chicago-Kent College of Law	Chicago, Illinois	Active	
1989	University of Miami School of Law	Coral Gables, Florida	Active	
1990	Loyola Law School	Los Angeles, California	Active	
1992	DePaul University College of Law	Chicago, Illinois	Active	
1994	American University Washington College of Law	Washington, D.C.	Active	
1994	Fordham University School of Law	Manhattan, New York City, New York	Active	
1996	University of San Diego School of Law	San Diego, California	Active	
1997	Wake Forest University School of Law	Winston-Salem, North Carolina	Active	
1999	Benjamin N. Cardozo School of Law	New York City, New York	Active	
2004	Santa Clara University School of Law	Santa Clara, California	Active	
2004	Seton Hall University School of Law	Newark, New Jersey	Active	
2008	Pepperdine University School of Law	Malibu, California	Active	
2012	University of Richmond School of Law	Richmond, Virginia	Active	
2014	University at Buffalo Law School	Amherst, New York	Active	
2014	Temple University Beasley School of Law	Philadelphia, Pennsylvania	Active	
2016	Sturm College of Law	Denver, Colorado	Active	
2016	Georgia State University College of Law	Atlanta, Georgia	Active	
2018	Rutgers Law School	Newark and Camden, New Jersey	Active	
2019	Texas A&M University School of Law	Fort Worth, Texas	Active	
2022	Penn State Law	University Park, Pennsylvania	Active	
2025	Michigan State University College of Law	East Lansing, Michigan	Active	
2025	Drexel University School of Law	Philadelphia, Pennsylvania	Active	
2026	University of California, Irvine School of Law	Irvine, California	Active	
