= Furgeson =

Furgeson is a surname. Notable people with the surname include:

- Colleen Furgeson (born 1998), Marshallese swimmer
- William Royal Furgeson Jr. (born 1941), American judge

== See also ==
- Ferguson (name)
