= Jefferson School of Law =

Jefferson School of Law may refer to:

- Thomas Jefferson School of Law in San Diego, California
- Jefferson School of Law (Louisville, Kentucky), a defunct school which merged into the University of Louisville School of Law in 1950
- Jefferson Law School, a defunct school in Dallas, Texas
