= Brad Rogers =

American football official

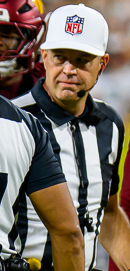
- Rogers in 2025
- Education: Lubbock Christian University
- Occupation: NFL official (2017–present)

Brad Rogers is an American professional football official in the National Football League (NFL) since the 2017 NFL season, wearing uniform number 126.

== Career ==
Rogers began officiating in 1991, working Texas high school football games. From there, Rogers became an official in the Southeastern Conference and Conference USA, where he worked at the center judge and referee positions. In 2015, Rogers worked NFL preseason games as part of the league's Officiating Development Program.

Rogers was hired by the NFL in 2017 as a field judge, and was promoted to referee with the start of the 2019 NFL season following the retirement of John Parry. He worked on the crews of Pete Morelli and Shawn Smith before being promoted to referee.

Outside of his NFL duties, Rogers is currently an assistant girls basketball coach at Lubbock Christian High School. He began in 1999 as an assistant coach with the boys program and stepped away after that season. He then resumed coaching as an assistant coach with the boys in 2006. His teams have played in 11 State Tournaments and won the state championship 6 times and 5 straight state championship with the girls (2021, 2022, 2023, 2024, and 2025).

=== 2024 Crew ===
- R: Brad Rogers
- U: Bryan Neale
- DJ: Kent Payne
- LJ: Kevin Codey
- FJ: Joe Blubaugh
- SJ: Anthony Jeffries
- BJ: Greg Yette
- RO: Roddy Ames
- RA: Artenzia Young-Seigler

== Personal life ==
Rogers resides in Lubbock, Texas. Outside of the NFL, Rogers was a professor in the business department at his alma mater, Lubbock Christian University. He is currently a professor in the Management department at Texas Tech University.
