= L. Ken Jones =

Chancellor of Lubbock Christian University

Chancellor of LCU
- In office February 2011 – Present

Personal details
- Spouse: Suzie Jones
- Children: Mitch; Jenny
- Education: Oklahoma State University BS MS & PhD in Agricultural Engineering

Dr. L. Ken Jones is the chancellor of Lubbock Christian University in Lubbock, Texas. Dr. Jones served as the fifth president of LCU from 1993 until 2011 when he was named chancellor. L. Timothy Perrin succeeded Dr. Jones as president of LCU. In addition to being chancellor, Dr. Jones also took on the interim role of President of the LCU Foundation in 2014.

== Early career ==
Jones began an engineering career in 1974 as a civil engineer in hydrology subsection for the U.S. Army Corps of Engineers in Tulsa, Oklahoma. A year later Jones moved to Perry, OK, to be an area engineer for the Soil Conservation Service from 1975 until 1978 when he accepted an assistant professor of agricultural engineering position at Oklahoma State University.

Jones switched his career goals from engineering to ministry in 1982 when he became the pulpit minister for North Garland Church of Christ in Enid, OK, for six years. In 1988 Jones moved to Lubbock, Texas, to serve as pulpit minister at Sunset Church of Christ. Jones then became president of Lubbock Christian University in 1993, where he served for eighteen years, making Jones the longest sitting president in LCU’s history. Jones stepped down from the presidency to pursue more public speaking opportunities as LCU’s first Chancellor in 2011.

== Publications ==
Dr. Jones authored The Ultimate Leader (2002) and Leadership after God’s Own Heart (Star Bible 1999).

== Education ==
Dr. Jones received his Agricultural Engineering bachelors (’73), masters (’74), and Ph.D. (’81) from Oklahoma State University in Stillwater, OK.

In 2013 Dr. Jones earned his Emotional Intelligence Certification, Leadership Coaching Certification, and Appreciative Inquiry Facilitator Training. He frequently speaks on leadership at churches, educational groups, businesses, and major corporations, and he often hosts leadership seminars.

== Personal life ==
Dr. Jones, born and raised in Oklahoma, has a particular interest in farming and ranching. His son continues to ranch for the family business near Cordell, Oklahoma. Other hobbies include reading, writing, and speaking.
