= University of North Texas at Dallas =

Public university in Dallas, Texas, U.S.

- Former names: University of North Texas System Center; University of North Texas Dallas Campus
- Type: Public university
- Established: 2000; 26 years ago
- Parent institution: University of North Texas System
- Accreditation: SACS
- Academic affiliations: CUMU
- President: Warren Von Eschenbach
- Students: 3,798
- Location: Dallas, Texas, U.S. 32°39′31″N 96°48′14″W
- Campus: Urban, 264 acres (1.07 km^{2})
- Colors: Blue and white
- Nickname: Trailblazers (formerly The Jaguars)
- Sporting affiliations: NAIA – Red River
- Mascot: Jax
- Website: untdallas.edu
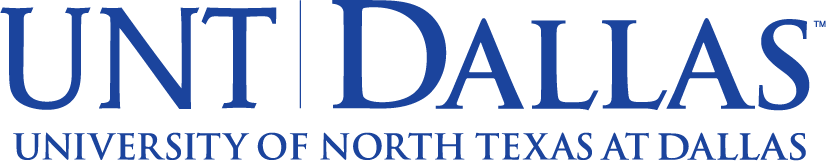

The University of North Texas at Dallas (UNT Dallas) is a public university in Dallas, Texas, United States. Part of the University of North Texas System, the university was founded in 2000 and became an independent institution in 2010. Serving approximately 4,000 students, the university offers undergraduate and graduate programs across several disciplines, including education, business, and law. The university's College of Law is located in downtown Dallas.

== History and development ==
=== Origins and founding (1997–2000) ===
In 1997, Texas state senator Royce West suggested a feasibility study for a state university in southern Dallas County, an area of Dallas County that is predominantly African American and was then served only by the private Paul Quinn College. The campus, which was to become the first public university within Dallas city limits, was launched at a temporary location in the spring 2000 semester with an enrollment of 204 part-time students, a full-time equivalent enrollment of 55 students.

=== Campus establishment and growth (2001–2010) ===
The Dallas City Council approved a resolution in June 2001 to provide up to $3 million by January 2002 to buy about 200 acres (0.81 km^{2}) in southern Dallas' I-20 corridor for the future UNT Dallas campus. Private donations raised the size of the property for the new university campus to 264 acres (1.07 km^{2}).

A 2001 bill passed by the Texas Legislature and signed into law by governor Rick Perry authorized the UNT System to establish UNT Dallas as an independent university once enrollment reached 2,500. A 2003 bill changed the requirement to the equivalent of 1,000 full-time students for one semester. A ground-breaking ceremony for the first building on the future campus took place in October 2005. The first permanent building on the UNT Dallas Campus site, a 76,000-square-foot (7,100 m^{2}) building, was occupied in January 2007. The building was made possible by a state tuition revenue bond initiative of $25.5 million. Further funding from the same source was used to construct the second building, and construction began in 2009.

Enrollment on the UNT Dallas Campus initially grew at an average annual rate of 14 percent per year and reached the necessary full-time equivalent of 1,000 students during the spring semester of 2007. In April 2009, the Texas Higher Education Coordinating Board certified this enrollment and granted UNT Dallas status as an independent general academic institution. Freshmen and sophomores were admitted for the first time in the Fall of 2010.

=== Leadership and institutional development (2010–present) ===
In 2010, the University of North Texas at Dallas admitted its first freshman and sophomore classes, marking its transition into a four-year institution. This same year, construction was completed on Founders Hall, the university’s second academic building.

In 2013, the UNT Dallas College of Law was established as part of the UNT System, with Senior U.S. District Judge William Royal Furgeson, Jr. serving as the founding dean. The law school is located downtown in the Dallas Municipal Building. It began accepting students in 2014 and was granted full accreditation by the American Bar Association in 2022.

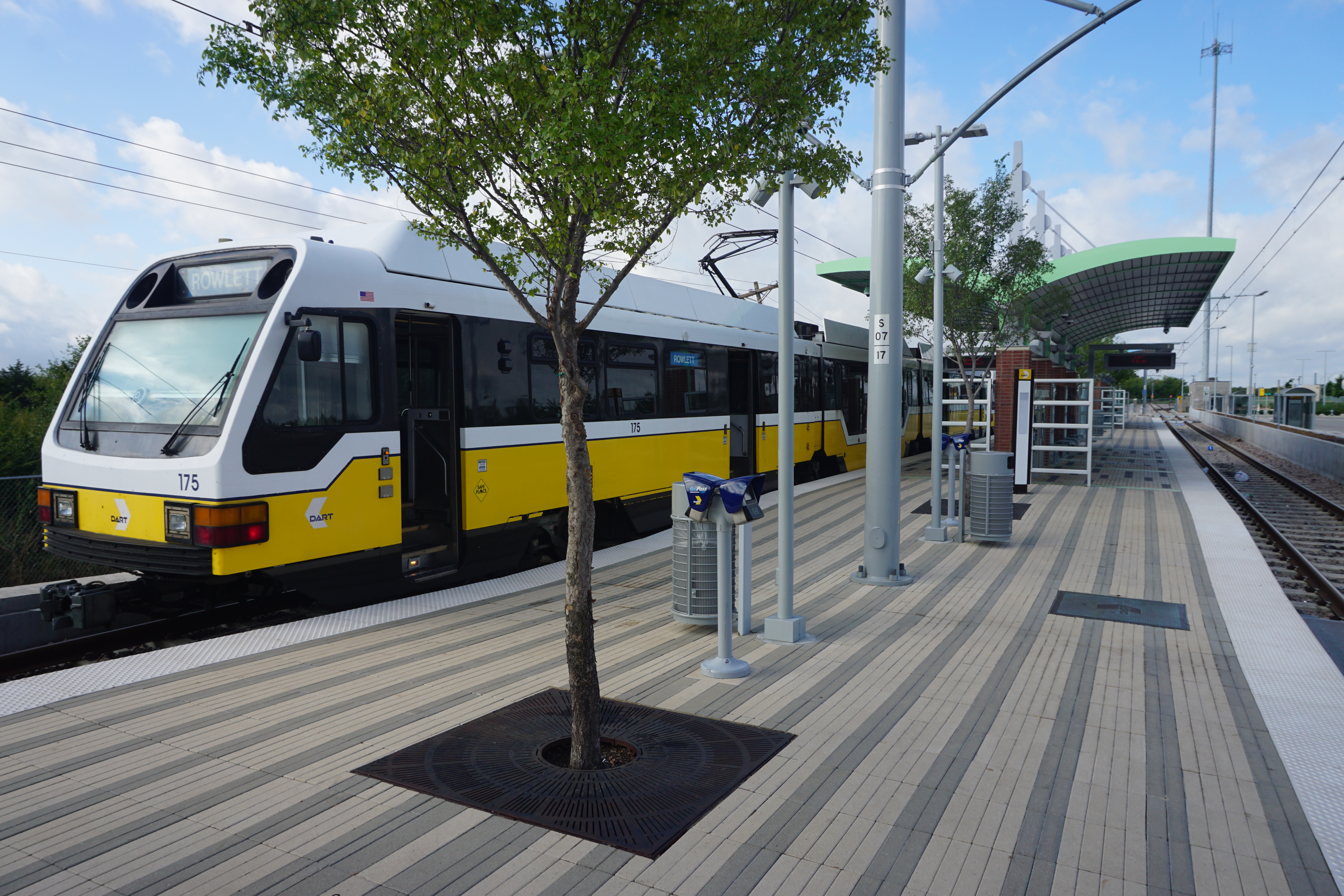
UNT Dallas DART station

In 2016, the Dallas Area Rapid Transit (DART) system opened the UNT Dallas Station on the Blue Line, improving public transportation access to the campus. That same year, university enrollment surpassed 3,000 students for the first time.

The university’s first residence hall, Wisdom Hall, opened in 2017, providing on-campus housing for students. In 2019, UNT Dallas opened a new Student Center, which includes dining facilities, student services, and event spaces. In 2020, the university launched the Trailblazer Elite Program to provide academic and social support for first-generation college students. In 2021, the Hart Amphitheater opened as an outdoor venue for academic and cultural programming.

In 2022, the university dedicated the Ryan Tower, a 180 feet (55 m) structure located at the center of campus, funded by a $2 million private gift. That same year, UNT Dallas established the Center for Socioeconomic Mobility Through Education to support research and community engagement on educational access and upward mobility.

In 2023, the university broke ground on a $100 million STEM facility, designed to expand instruction and research in science, technology, engineering, and mathematics. The building is scheduled for completion in 2025.

During this period, UNT Dallas expanded its academic offerings, student services, and physical campus, and added several support programs and facilities intended to serve a growing and diverse student population. As of 2025, the university offers 22 undergraduate program, 8 graduate programs, and one professional degree (Juris Doctor). In March 2026, the university announced that tuition would be free for students in families that earn less than $100,000 per year.

== Schools and College of Law ==
=== University of North Texas at Dallas College of Law ===
The UNT Dallas College of Law is the only public law school in Dallas and is fully accredited by the American Bar Association (ABA). Founded in 2014, the college initially operated in the historic Titche-Goettinger Building before relocating to its permanent home at 106 S. Harwood St. in downtown Dallas.

=== School of Behavioral Health and Human Services ===
The School of Behavioral Health and Human Services offers educational programs that focus on human development in social, counseling, mental health, and child and family services.

=== School of Business ===
UNTD's School of Business offers a variety of undergraduate and graduate programs that cater to the needs of the Dallas-Fort Worth business community.

=== School of Education ===
The UNT Dallas School of Education offers a wide range of programs that equip students for careers in education, including bachelor’s and graduate degrees.

=== School of Liberal Arts and Sciences ===
The School of Liberal Arts and Sciences at UNT Dallas offers a variety of interdisciplinary programs. There are fourteen undergraduate programs and two Master's programs. The school maintains small class sizes with a 17:1 student-to-professor ratio. There are several student service programs sponsored by the school, including the STEM Center and BAT-LSAMP Program, which support STEM majors. Additionally, the school partners with the SERCH Institute, a community organization that serves the citizens of South Dallas.

== Student life ==
As of the fall of 2024, the university enrolled 3,774 students. The campus demographics are shown in the graphs below.

Student body demographics by ethnicity, fall 2024
Ethnicity	Percentage
Hispanic	51
Black	26
Caucasian	15
Two or more ethnicities listed	3
Asian	3
Unknown	2
International	1
American Indian or Alaskan	0.1
Native Hawaiian or Pacific Islander	0.02

Student body demographics by gender, fall 2024
Gender	Percentage
Female	65
Male	35

Full-time faculty demographics by ethnicity, fall 2021
Ethnicity	Percentage
Caucasian	60
Black	16
Asian	13
Hispanic	10
American Indian or Alaskan	1

Student organizations, honor societies, and faith-based campus groups are each led by students under the advisement of a faculty member. These organizations exist to provide opportunities for personal and professional growth, as well as socialization on campus. There are approximately 30 student-led organizations currently listed at the university.

Among the student organizations listed, the social Greek community at the university is made up of 10 sororities and fraternities. Seven of these are already established with campus chapters, while the other three are currently awaiting chapter approval.

=== Campus events ===
UNTD also has activities for students to connect with one another on campus. Such campus events include monthly food distribution events with the North Texas Food Bank and workshops aimed at raising awareness for various groups which have been historically underrepresented.

=== Residential life ===
UNTD offers students the opportunity to live on campus in its residential hall. The university includes accommodations for students living on campus, as well as a list of resources for students interested in applying for off-campus housing. Students are not required to live on campus to maintain enrollment.

For transportation to and from campus, the university offers access via the Dallas Area Rapid Transit (DART) bus.

== Athletics ==
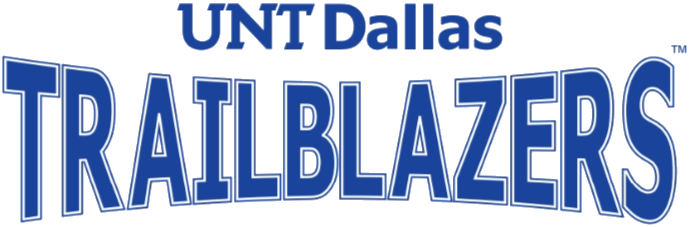
UNT Dallas athletics wordmark

The university's athletic teams are known as the Trailblazers and compete in the National Association of Intercollegiate Athletics (NAIA). The Trailblazers became official members of the Sooner Athletic Conference (SAC) in the 2021-2022 season, Joining 12 other university's in a conference that has won 109 NAIA championships since its inception in 1978. The Trailblazers left the Sooner to become a full member of the Red River Athletic Conference on July 1st, 2025.

UNT Dallas competes in six intercollegiate varsity sports. Men's sports include basketball, cross country and track & field; women's sports likewise include basketball, cross country and track & field. The university offers a co-ed Esports program, whose varsity division joins over 260 other universities as members of the National Association of Collegiate Esports (NACE).

=== Staff and facilities ===
The Trailblazers are led by athletic director and former Dallas Maverick All-Star Josh Howard. Howard, who doubles as the head men's basketball coach, became athletic director in the 2024-25 season. He is assisted by fellow North Carolina native Matthew Johnson. The women's basketball team is led by interim Head Coach Shelia Davis and Assistant Otis Nicksion, while the track and field programs are headed by interim Knashia Dawson. All athletic programs currently compete and practice at the Jesse Owens Memorial Athletic Complex, located about 2 miles from campus. This multi-sport complex, built in 2005 to support DISD middle and high school athletics, features the Ellis Davis Fieldhouse and John Kincade Stadium, with seating capacities of 7,500 and 12,000, respectively.
