= L. Timothy Perrin =

American Academic

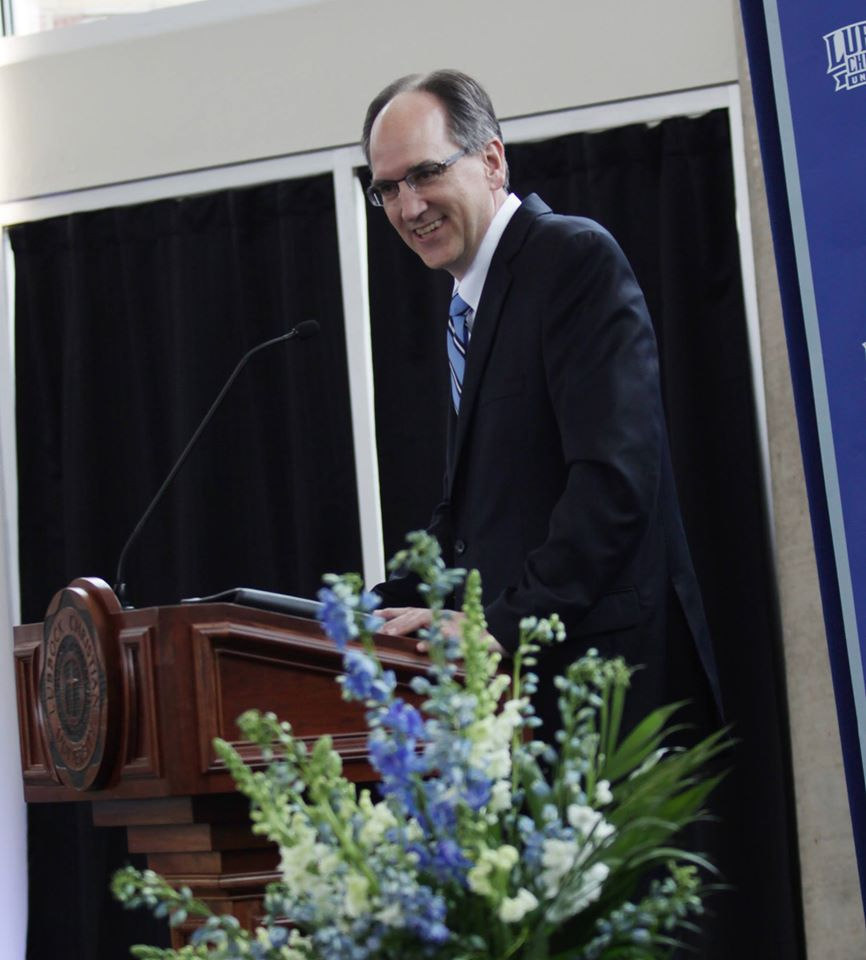

6th President of Lubbock Christian University
- In office June 2012 – July 2019
- Preceded by: L. Ken Jones

Personal details
- Education: Lubbock Christian University (BA) in History; Texas Tech University School of Law (JD)

Larry Timothy Perrin is an American legal scholar and academic administrator who was the sixth president of Lubbock Christian University from 2012 to 2019. He currently serves as senior vice president of Pepperdine University.

== Early career ==
Perrin was a trial attorney at Gary, Thomasson, Hall & Marks Professional Corporation in Corpus Christi, Texas from 1987 until 1992. He defended corporations in general civil litigation in state and federal courts.

In 1992, Perrin began teaching law at Pepperdine University. In 2003, he became Pepperdine's first Associate Provost, and in 2007 he became the first Vice Dean of Pepperdine University School of Law.

Between 2012 and 2019, Perrin served as the sixth president of Lubbock Christian University in Lubbock, Texas. During his tenure, the university opened its first study abroad program, built several academic buildings, launched several academic centers and institutes, and more than doubled its endowment.

In 2019, Perrin returned to Pepperdine in the role of senior vice president.

== Publications ==
Perrin is the co-author of The Art & Science of Trial Advocacy (LexisNexis 2009, Second Edition 2011), and co-author of a collection of case files: Case Files for Basic Trial Advocacy, also published by LexisNexis. He has also written more than 15 law review articles, with an emphasis in trial advocacy.

== Education ==
Perrin received his Bachelor of Arts in History from Lubbock Christian University in 1984. While at LCU, Perrin served as the student body president his senior year and played for the LCU Chaparrals basketball team all four years. He holds the LCU men's basketball record for highest free throw percentage in a season with 89.8%. He graduated summa cum laude.

Perrin graduated cum laude with his Juris Doctor from Texas Tech University School of Law in 1987. While in law school he served as associate editor of the law review, had two articles published in the Texas Tech Law Review, and received the Outstanding Written Comment award. He was elected for membership into the Order of the Coif and a member of the Phi Kappa Phi Honor Society.
