= Lubbock Christian University =

Private university in Lubbock, Texas, US

Coordinates: 33°34′25″N 101°56′1″W

- Former names: Lubbock Christian School (1954–1957); Lubbock Christian College (1957–1987)
- Motto: We Walk With You
- Type: Private university
- Established: 1957; 69 years ago
- Affiliations: Churches of Christ
- Endowment: $65.3 million (2026)
- President: Scott McDowell
- Provost: Kent Gallaher
- Faculty: 83 full-time faculty, 13 part-time faculty
- Students: 1,685 (Fall 2026)
- Location: Lubbock, Texas, United States
- Campus: 155 acres (63 ha)
- Colors: Blue & White
- Nickname: Chaparrals and Lady Chaps
- Sporting affiliations: NCAA Division II – Lone Star
- Mascot: Chaparral
- Website: www.lcu.edu

Lubbock Christian University (LCU) is a private, nonprofit Christian university in Lubbock, Texas, United States. Founded in 1957, the university offers undergraduate, master's, and doctoral degree programs and is affiliated with the Churches of Christ. LCU provides Christ-centered higher education and is in its 70th year of classes during the 2026-27 academic year.

== History ==
In 1954 the State of Texas approved the operation of a private educational institution for students from kindergarten through college. Lubbock Christian School was established that year, and Lubbock Christian College (LCC) was added in 1957 as a junior college. Lubbock Christian College opened its first classes on September 24, 1957, with 110 students and 16 faculty members. F.W. Mattox served as the founding president. LCC received accreditation as a senior college in 1972 and attained university status in the fall of 1987, becoming Lubbock Christian University.

Lubbock Christian School and Lubbock Christian University officially separated into two independent entities in 2009.

Presidents who have led Lubbock Christian University are F. W. Mattox (1957–1974), W. Joe Hacker (1974–1976), Harvie Pruitt (1976–1982), Steven S. Lemley (1982–1993), L. Ken Jones (1993–2012), L. Timothy Perrin (2012–2019), and Scott McDowell (2020–present).

== Academic Structure ==
Lubbock Christian University is organized into five academic colleges and an honors college:

- Alfred & Patricia Smith College of Biblical Studies
- B. Ward Lane College of Science and Health Professions
- College of Business
- J.E. & Eileen Hancock College of Liberal Arts and Social Sciences
- J.E. & L.E. Mabee Foundation Honors College
- Phil & Jean Wynn College of Education

The colleges offer undergraduate and graduate programs, including two doctoral programs. The Doctor of Education (Ed.D.) is offered in Educational Leadership, while the Doctor of Nursing Practice (DNP) is offered through an APRN Track and an Education and Leadership Track.

== Student Life ==
Lubbock Christian University has gender-based social clubs. The women's social clubs are Christliche Damen, Kappa Phi Kappa, and Zeta Gamma. The men's social clubs are Koinonia and Alpha Chi Delta. There is also one fraternity on campus, Sub T-16. The fraternity Sub T-16 has chapters at other churches of Christ-affiliated schools such as Abilene Christian University and Harding University.

LCU offers more than 25 student organizations and more than 13 intramural sports. The Rhodes-Perrin Recreation Center is a 70,000 square foot facility that includes four regulation basketball courts, volleyball courts, handball and racquetball courts, an indoor futsal court, the Ramona Perrin Fitness Center, a group fitness room, an indoor walking and running track, and a rock-climbing wall. The facility also houses the university's Department of Exercise and Sports Sciences.

Through its global campus programs, LCU students have the opportunities to study, participate in internships, and engage in educational and service experiences in the United States and abroad.The university's semester-abroad program is based in Ávila, Spain, and the other programs have included destinations such as Peru, Austria and Croatia, as well as U.S. cities including Boston, Philadelphia, and Washington, D.C. Through the LCU in Washington program, students may spend a semester or summer in Washington, D.C., while completing an internship.

== Athletics ==
The Lubbock Christian athletic teams are called the Chaparrals and Lady Chaps. The university is a member of the NCAA Division II ranks, primarily competing in the Lone Star Conference (LSC) since the 2019–20 academic year. The Chaparrals and Lady Chaps previously had competed in the D-II Heartland Conference from 2013–14 to 2018–19; in the Sooner Athletic Conference (SAC) of the National Association of Intercollegiate Athletics (NAIA) from 1994–95 to 2012–13; and in the Texas Intercollegiate Athletic Association (TIAA) of the NCAA Division III ranks from 1979–80 to 1981–82.

Lubbock Christian competes in 17 intercollegiate varsity sports: Men's sports include baseball, basketball, cross country, golf, soccer, tennis and track & field; while women's sports include basketball, cross country, golf, soccer, softball, tennis, track & field and volleyball; and co-ed sports include cheerleading and eSports.

Before transitioning to NCAA Division II, LCU competed in the National Association of Intercollegiate Athletics (NAIA) for more than 30 years. During its NAIA era, LCU won national championships in baseball in 1983 and 2009, softball in 2008, men's cross country, and men's track and field. The 2008 softball championship came during the program's inaugural season.

The Lady Chaps have won three NCAA Division II Women's Basketball National Championships. In their first year eligible for NCAA DII postseason play, LCU defeated the University of Alaska Anchorage 78 to 73 on April 4, 2016, in Indianapolis, Indiana, to complete an undefeated season and win the national championship. The Lady Chaps won their second NCAA DII championship in 2019, defeating Southwestern Oklahoma State University 95 to 85 in double overtime in Columbus, Ohio. On March 26, 2021, LCU defeated Drury University 69 to 59 in Columbus, Ohio, to win its third NCAA DII national championship.

== Notable alumni ==
- R. Gerald Turner, President of Southern Methodist University
- Larry Hays, retired Texas Tech Red Raiders baseball coach
- Matt Martin, baseball coach with the Detroit Tigers
- The Otwell Twins, singers on The Lawrence Welk Show, Amarillo businessmen
- Britt Bonneau, college baseball coach at Abilene Christian
- Randy Velarde, Retired Major League Baseball player
- Rob Evans, former head men's basketball coach, University of Mississippi, and Arizona State University
- Brad Rogers, Football Official with the National Football League
- Marvin Lee Aday, musician and actor – attended briefly in 1965 then transferred to North Texas State College
- L. Timothy Perrin, attorney and sixth LCU president, current SVP at Pepperdine University.
- Dr. John Delony, author, co-host of the nationally syndicated radio program The Ramsey Show, and host The Dr. John Delony Show podcast.
