= Texas A&M University School of Law =

Law school in Fort Worth, Texas, US

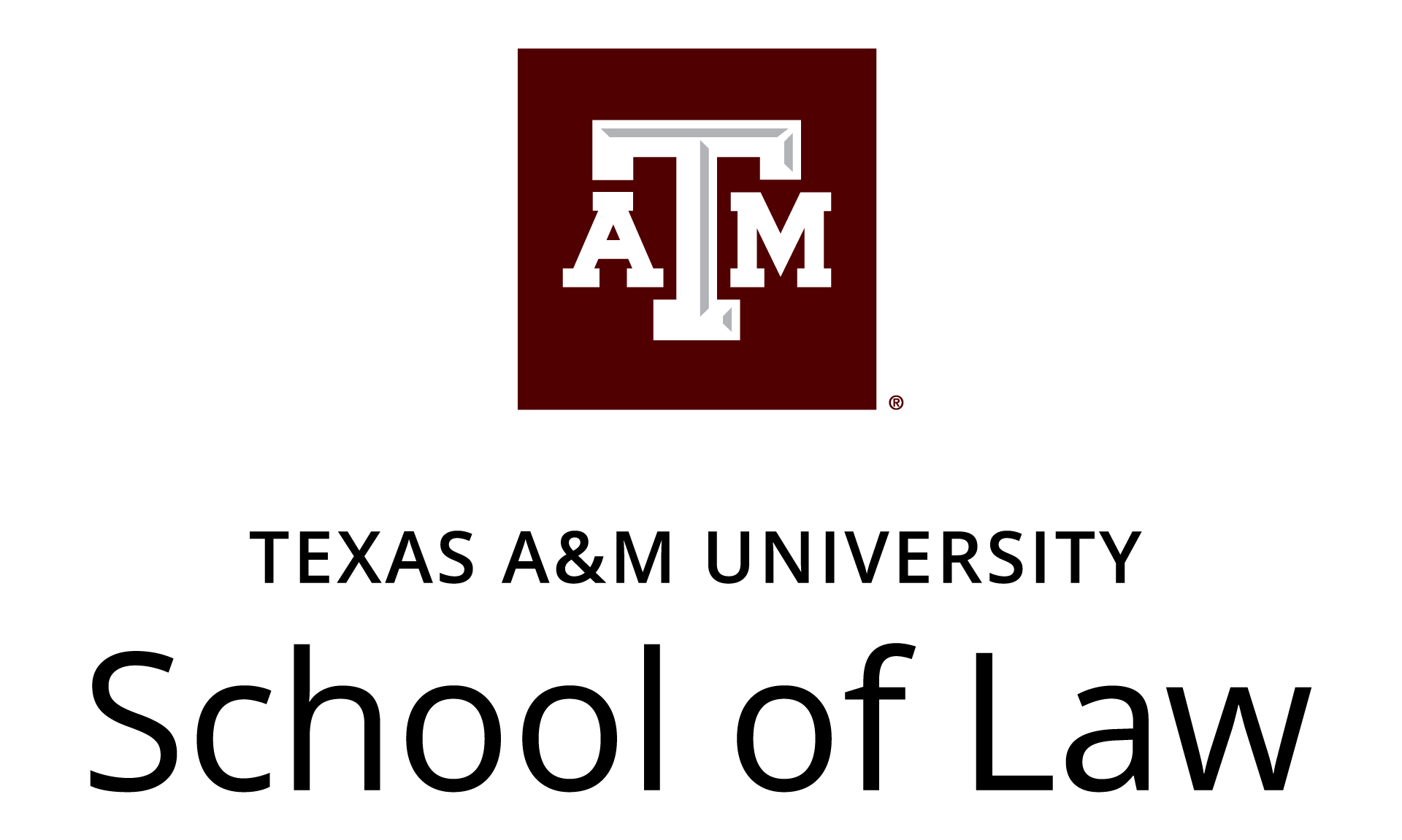
- Parent school: Texas A&M University
- Established: 1989; 37 years ago
- School type: Public law school
- Parent endowment: $22.2 billion (Texas A&M University System, FY2025)
- Dean: Robert B. Ahdieh
- Location: Fort Worth, Texas, United States; 32°44′55″N 97°19′33″W
- Enrollment: 522 (2021)
- Faculty: 70 (full-time), 78 (part-time) (2025)
- USNWR ranking: 22nd (tie) (2025)
- Bar pass rate: 95.28% (2025 first-time takers, all jurisdictions)
- Website: law.tamu.edu

Texas A&M University School of Law is the law school of Texas A&M University located in downtown Fort Worth, Texas. Established in 1989 as the Texas Wesleyan University School of Law, it was formerly the law school of Texas Wesleyan University until the law school was acquired by Texas A&M University on August 12, 2013. On August 13, 2013, fully accredited by the American Bar Association, it began operations at the same location. The law school is a member of the Association of American Law Schools (AALS).

== History ==
Founded in 1989, the law school began as the Dallas/Fort Worth School of Law in Irving, Texas, and then became the Texas Wesleyan University School of Law in 1992. On June 26, 2012, Texas A&M University reached an agreement with Texas Wesleyan University under which it would take over ownership and operational control of the law school, to be renamed the Texas A&M University School of Law. The agreement became final on August 12, 2013, with Texas A&M purchasing the school and all its physical and licensing assets for $73 million. After the sale, Texas A&M University declined to re-issue Texas A&M diplomas to law school alumni, stating that A&M lacked the necessary accreditation to do so.

== Programs ==
The School of Law at Texas A&M University offers the Juris Doctor (J.D.), Master of Laws (LL.M.) and Master of Legal Studies (M.L.S.).

The J.D. is a three-year, full-time program taught in person at the law school in Fort Worth, Texas. The program has 12-week fall and spring semesters and a seven-week summer session with a limited course schedule. To graduate, students must complete a minimum of 90 credit hours with a cumulative GPA of at least 2.33, an upper-level rigorous writing requirements, experiential requirements, and a 30-hour pro bono requirement, all within 72 months of starting the program.

The L.L.M. is a one-year, full-time or online 24-credit program for J.D. graduates or individuals with a first degree in law from a foreign university and want to specialize in a particular area of law. Students without a J.D. from an American Bar Association-approved law school must take a mandatory course Introduction to the U.S. Legal System. Specializations are offered in Intellectual Property, International Tax Law and Policy, Risk management, Wealth Management, and preparation for the Texas Bar Examination. Each specialization requires 3 hours of core courses and 21 hours of specialized electives.

The M.L.S. is a one to two years, online or hybrid 30-credit program for non-lawyer professionals with a bachelor's degree who do not intend to practice law. The program offers 12 emphases: General Legal Studies, Intellectual Property, International Tax Law and Policy, Risk Management and Compliance, Wealth Management, Business Law and Compliance, Environmental and Energy Law and Policy, Cybersecurity Law and Policy, Energy, Oil, and Gas Law and Policy, Health Law, Policy, and Management, Human Resources and Employment Law, Policy, and Management, Real Estate and Construction Law, Policy, and Management. Most emphases require 12 hours of core-courses and 18 hours of approved electives.

== Academics ==
Since its acquisition by Texas A&M University, the law school has increased the size of the faculty by 30% while reducing the size of incoming classes, with an 8.4:1 student-faculty ratio in the 2016–17 academic year. It also boosted the overall scholarship budget by 65%.

Through the Advocacy Program, students may compete in Moot Court (appellate advocacy), Mock Trial (trial advocacy) and Alternative Dispute Resolution (negotiation, mediation and arbitration).

The Texas A&M Law Fellowship is a student-run organization whose stated mission is to raise awareness of legal work in the public interest sector. It awards fellowships to students who work in public interest organizations during the summer with funds raised at the annual Law Fellowship Gala and Auction.

The legal clinics offered at the law school include the Community Development Clinic, Criminal Defense Clinic, Entrepreneurship Law Clinic, Family Law and Veterans Clinic, Immigrant Rights Clinic, Intellectual Property and Technology Law Clinic, Low Income Tax Clinic, and Wills and Estates Clinic. Students who are accepted into the clinic are supervised by practicing attorneys and a faculty supervisor. In 2014, the United States Patent and Trademark Office approved a clinic at the law school after the school had shown a strong intellectual property program. The school has expanded that program, doubling the faculty in 2015.

The law school also hosts honor societies including the Elliott Inn of Phi Delta Phi and the Order of the Coif.

== Admissions ==
Texas A&M was tracked as the moderately selective law schools in 2019, placing 37th nationally in a 24/7 Wall St. ranking. The institution has since climbed to No. 22 nationally in the U.S. News & World Report rankings, based on its competitive acceptance rate, a median LSAT, and a competitive median undergraduate GPA, cementing its status as one of the most difficult law programs to secure admission to in the United States.

Texas A&M accepted 12.1% of applicants in 2026. The median LSAT score is 170, and the median GPA is 4.00. Women make up 53.3% of the 2026 first-year class, minorities make up 32% of the class, and the average age is 24.

== Tuition ==
As part of the transition from a private to a public institution, in 2015 the law school announced that it would offer in-state tuition beginning in the 2016–17 academic year, resulting in a reduction in tuition and fees for Texas residents. It also guaranteed a locked tuition rate to all students for up to four academic years.

For the 2023–2024 academic year, full-time resident tuition and fees are $32,634; for non-residents, tuition and fees are $48,682. For the 2021–2022 academic year, full-time resident tuition and fees are $32,634; for non-residents, tuition and fees are $48,618. In the 2020–2021 academic year, 92% of Texas A&M law students received a grant or scholarship with a median total award of $27,000 for full-time students.

== Rankings ==
Texas A&M University is ranked tied for 22nd nationally in the 2025–2026 edition of the U.S. News Rankings of Best Law Schools. For 2025, the school is also ranked tied 6th for its intellectual property law program and tied 3rd for its dispute resolution program.

Texas A&M's overall U.S. News ranking has increased rapidly since 2015, when it was unranked. Between 1998 and 2020, the school experienced the largest increase of any law school to its academic reputation score rising from 1.5 to 2.6 (out of 5 points). This score, based on a survey of law school faculties, is the largest single factor in the U.S. News rankings methodology. U.S. News has previously ranked the law school 149th (2016), 111th (2017), 92nd (2018), 80th (2019), 83rd (2020), 60th (2021), 53rd (2022), 46th (2023), tied for 29th (2024), and tied for 22nd (2025).

== Bar exam ==
Passage Rates for Texas law schools by year:

First Time Bar Passage (2025)
School	Passage Rate
SMU Dedman School of Law	97.75%
University of Texas School of Law	96.39%
Texas Tech University School of Law	95.32%
Texas A&M School of Law	95.28%
Baylor Law School	93.69%
South Texas College of Law	85.56%
St. Mary's University School of Law	84.62%
University of Houston Law Center	84.45%
UNT Dallas College of Law	79.67%
Texas Southern University Thurgood Marshall School of Law	62.89%

First Time Bar Passage (2024)
School	Passage Rate
Texas A&M School of Law	95.98%
University of Texas School of Law	95.86%
Baylor Law School	94.92%
South Texas College of Law Houston	91.13%
SMU Dedman School of Law	90.20%
University of Houston Law Center	88.63%
Texas Tech University School of Law	86.30%
UNT Dallas College of Law	72.53%
Texas Southern University Thurgood Marshall School of Law	72.36%
St. Mary's University School of Law	65.84%

First Time Bar Passage (2023)
School	Passage Rate
Texas A&M School of Law	94.63%
University of Texas School of Law	92.72%
Baylor Law School	92.38%
Texas Tech University School of Law	91.80%
University of Houston Law Center	89.42%
SMU Dedman School of Law	87.18%
South Texas College of Law	81.02%
St. Mary’s University School of Law	77.51%
UNT Dallas College of Law	70.00%
Texas Southern University Thurgood Marshall School of Law	62.83%

First Time Bar Passage (2022)
School	Passage Rate
Baylor Law School	95.96%
Texas A&M School of Law	88.96%
University of Texas School of Law	87.44%
SMU Dedman School of Law	86.59%
University of Houston Law Center	84.66%
Texas Tech University School of Law	81.31%
South Texas College of Law	80.89%
St. Mary’s University School of Law	71.73%
UNT Dallas College of Law	61.05%
Texas Southern University Thurgood Marshall School of Law	50.93%

First Time Bar Passage (2021)
School	Passage Rate
University of Texas School of Law	94.6%
Texas A&M School of Law	93.33%
Texas Tech University School of Law	90.9%
University of Houston Law Center	87.08%
Baylor Law School	87.05%
SMU Dedman School of Law	85.94%
St. Mary’s University School of Law	71.67%
South Texas College of Law	71.57%
UNT Dallas College of Law	68.37%
Texas Southern University Thurgood Marshall School of Law	54.17%

First Time Bar Passage (2020)
School	Passage Rate
University of Texas School of Law	95.05%
Texas Tech University School of Law	93.81%
Texas A&M School of Law	92.13%
Baylor Law School	87.25%
University of Houston Law Center	86.06%
SMU Dedman School of Law	85.18%
South Texas College of Law	79.03%
St. Mary's University School of Law	70.41%
UNT Dallas College of Law	59.34%
Texas Southern University Thurgood Marshall School of Law	51.74%

First Time Bar Passage (2019)
School	Passage Rate
University of Texas School of Law	93.29%
Texas A&M School of Law	90.32%
Baylor Law School	90.32%
SMU Dedman School of Law	86.51%
University of Houston Law Center	85.14%
Texas Tech University School of Law	82.09%
South Texas College of Law	76.63%
St. Mary's University School of Law	69.65%
UNT Dallas College of Law	69.48%
Texas Southern University Thurgood Marshall School of Law	55.77%

Ultimate Bar Passage Within 2 Years of Graduation (2018)
School	Passage Rate
University of Texas School of Law	97.06%
Texas Tech University School of Law	95.92%
SMU Dedman School of Law	95.73%
Texas A&M School of Law	94.78%
Baylor Law School	94.74%
South Texas College of Law	94.38%
University of Houston Law Center	92.76%
St. Mary's University School of Law	84.91%
UNT Dallas College of Law	80.74%
Texas Southern University Thurgood Marshall School of Law	75.86%

Ultimate Bar Passage Within 2 Years of Graduation (2017)
School	Passage Rate
Baylor Law School	97.06%
University of Texas School of Law	96.78%
SMU Dedman School of Law	94.61%
Texas Tech University School of Law	92.55%
Texas A&M School of Law	89.47%
University of Houston Law Center	88.50%
UNT Dallas College of Law	87.18%
South Texas College of Law	85.50%
St. Mary's University School of Law	84.91%
Texas Southern University Thurgood Marshall School of Law	79.69%

== Employment ==
Class of 2025:

Out of 124 total graduates of the Class of 2025, 99.2% (or 123 graduates) obtained full-time, long-term employment for which bar passage was required or for which a J.D. was an advantage within 10 months of graduation. 94.4% (or 117 graduates) were employed in long-term, full-time, bar passage required jobs (i.e. as attorneys) excluding solo practice. 0.8% (or 1 graduate) were unemployed and seeking work, pursuing an additional degree, or working in a non-professional, short term, or part-time job within 10 months of graduation.

Of those graduates, 8.1% (or 10 graduates) obtained federal clerkships, and 23.4% (or 29 graduates) obtained jobs at large law firms with more than 100 lawyers. 23.4% (or 29 graduates) obtained full-time, long-term public service positions in government or public interest.

Class of 2024:

Out of 178 total graduates of the Class of 2024, 100.0% (or 178 graduates) obtained full-time, long-term employment for which bar passage was required or for which a J.D. was an advantage within 10 months of graduation. 92.7% (or 165 graduates) were employed in long-term, full-time, bar passage required jobs (i.e. as attorneys) excluding solo practice. 0.0% (or 0 graduates) were unemployed and seeking work, pursuing an additional degree, or working in a non-professional, short term, or part-time job within 10 months of graduation.

Of those graduates, 1.7% (or 3 graduates) obtained federal clerkships, and 25.3% (or 45 graduates) obtained jobs at large law firms with more than 100 lawyers. 23.0% (or 41 graduates) obtained full-time, long-term public service positions in government or public interest.

Class of 2023:

Out of 162 total graduates of the Class of 2023, 98.8% (or 160 graduates) obtained full-time, long-term employment for which bar passage was required or for which a J.D. was an advantage within 10 months of graduation. 86.4% (or 140 graduates) were employed in long-term, full-time, bar passage required jobs (i.e. as attorneys) excluding solo practice. 1.2% (or 2 graduates) were unemployed and seeking work, pursuing an additional degree, or working in a non-professional, short term, or part-time job within 10 months of graduation.

Of those graduates, 4.9% (or 8 graduates) obtained federal clerkships, and 13.0% (or 21 graduates) obtained jobs at large law firms with more than 100 lawyers. 25.3% (or 41 graduates) obtained full-time, long-term public service positions in government or public interest.

Class of 2022:

Out of 172 total graduates of the Class of 2022, 98.3% (or 169 graduates) obtained full-time, long-term employment for which bar passage was required or for which a J.D. was an advantage within 10 months of graduation. 85.5% (or 147 graduates) were employed in long-term, full-time, bar passage required jobs (i.e. as attorneys) excluding solo practice. 1.7% (or 3 graduates) were unemployed and seeking work, pursuing an additional degree, or working in a non-professional, short term, or part-time job within 10 months of graduation.

Of those graduates, 4.7% (or 8 graduates) obtained federal clerkships, and 11.6% (or 20 graduates) obtained jobs at large law firms with more than 100 lawyers. 22.7% (or 39 graduates) obtained full-time, long-term public service positions in government or public interest.

Class of 2021:

Out of 169 total graduates of the Class of 2021, 94.7% (or 160 graduates) obtained full-time, long-term employment for which bar passage was required or for which a J.D. was an advantage within 10 months of graduation. 83.4% (or 141 graduates) were employed in long-term, full-time, bar passage required jobs (i.e. as attorneys) excluding solo practice. 5.3% (or 9 graduates) were unemployed and seeking work, pursuing an additional degree, or working in a non-professional, short term, or part-time job within 10 months of graduation.

Of those graduates, 7.1% (or 12 graduates) obtained federal clerkships, and 12.4% (or 21 graduates) obtained jobs at large law firms with more than 100 lawyers. 17.2% (or 29 graduates) obtained full-time, long-term public service positions in government or public interest.

Class of 2020:

Out of 130 total graduates of the Class of 2020, 93.8% (or 122 graduates) obtained full-time, long-term employment for which bar passage was required or for which a J.D. was an advantage within 10 months of graduation. 80.8% (or 105 graduates) were employed in long-term, full-time, bar passage required jobs (i.e. as attorneys) excluding solo practice. 5.4% (or 7 graduates) were unemployed and seeking work, pursuing an additional degree, or working in a non-professional, short term, or part-time job within 10 months of graduation.

Of those graduates, 4.6% (or 6 graduates) obtained federal clerkships, and 10.0% (or 13 graduates) obtained jobs at large law firms with more than 100 lawyers. 14.6% (or 19 graduates) obtained full-time, long-term public service positions in government or public interest.

Class of 2019:

Out of 130 total graduates of the Class of 2019, 92.3% (or 120 graduates) obtained full-time, long-term employment for which bar passage was required or for which a J.D. was an advantage within 10 months of graduation. 80.8% (or 105 graduates) were employed in long-term, full-time, bar passage required jobs (i.e. as attorneys) excluding solo practice. 6.2% (or 8 graduates) were unemployed and seeking work, pursuing an additional degree, or working in a non-professional, short term, or part-time job within 10 months of graduation.

Of those graduates, 3.1% (or 4 graduates) obtained federal clerkships, and 7.7% (or 10 graduates) obtained jobs at large law firms with more than 100 lawyers. 19.2% (or 25 graduates) obtained full-time, long-term public service positions in government or public interest.

Class of 2018:

Out of 138 total graduates of the Class of 2018, 82.6% (or 114 graduates) obtained full-time, long-term employment for which bar passage was required or for which a J.D. was an advantage within 10 months of graduation. 65.9% (or 91 graduates) were employed in long-term, full-time, bar passage required jobs (i.e. as attorneys) excluding solo practice. 11.6% (or 16 graduates) were unemployed and seeking work, pursuing an additional degree, or working in a non-professional, short term, or part-time job within 10 months of graduation.

Of those graduates, 2.2% (or 3 graduates) obtained federal clerkships, and 4.3% (or 6 graduates) obtained jobs at large law firms with more than 100 lawyers. 20.3% (or 28 graduates) obtained full-time, long-term public service positions in government or public interest.

== Scholarly publications ==
- Texas A&M Law Review
- Texas A&M Journal of Property Law
- Journal of Law & Civil Governance
