= William Royal Furgeson Jr. =

American judge

Senior Judge of the United States District Court for the Western District of Texas
- In office November 30, 2008 – May 31, 2013

Judge of the United States District Court for the Western District of Texas
- In office March 11, 1994 – November 30, 2008
- Appointed by: Bill Clinton
- Preceded by: Seat established by 104 Stat. 5089
- Succeeded by: Robert L. Pitman

Personal details
- Born: William Royal Furgeson Jr. December 9, 1941 (age 84) Lubbock, Texas
- Education: Texas Technological College (BA); University of Texas School of Law (JD)

William Royal Furgeson Jr. (born December 9, 1941) is a retired United States district judge of the United States District Court for the Western District of Texas. After leaving the bench, he became the Founding Dean of University of North Texas at Dallas College of Law in June 2013, where he served for five years. He retired in June 2018 as Dean Emeritus and now practices with the law firm of Furgeson Malouf Law PLLC.

== Education and early career ==
Born in Lubbock, Texas, Furgeson received a Bachelor of Arts degree from Texas Technological College (now Texas Tech University) in 1964 and a Juris Doctor with honors from the University of Texas School of Law in 1967. While in law school, he was an associate editor of the Texas Law Review. He served in the United States Army from 1967 to 1969, attaining the rank of captain. Returning to Texas after his military service, he shortly served as an assistant county attorney of County Attorney's Office, Lubbock, Texas, before he was appointed a law clerk for Judge Halbert O. Woodward of the United States District Court for the Northern District of Texas from 1969 to 1970.

In 1970 he started private practice in El Paso, practicing law for twenty-four years until 1993 with the law firm Kemp Smith. He is a fellow of the American College of Trial Lawyers, a member of the American Law Institute, and Board Certified by the Texas Board of Legal Specialization in Civil Trial Law. While in private practice, he was general campaign chair and president of the El Paso United Way, president of the El Paso chapter of the American Board of Trial Advocates, and president of the El Paso Bar Association.

== Federal judicial service ==
On November 19, 1993, President Bill Clinton nominated Furgeson to a new seat on the United States District Court for the Western District of Texas created by 104 Stat. 5089. He was confirmed by the United States Senate on March 10, 1994, and received his commission on March 11, 1994. In 2008, after taking senior status, Furgeson was reassigned to the United States District Court for the Northern District of Texas. He assumed senior status on November 30, 2008, and retired on May 31, 2013, to become the founding dean of the University of North Texas at Dallas College of Law, which opened in the fall of 2014.

During his time on the bench, in addition to his ongoing district court obligations, he was a panel judge on the Judicial Panel on Multidistrict Litigation, President of the Federal Judges Association, and a member of the Judicial Branch Committee of the Judicial Conference of the United States. He has also served as chair of the Judicial Resources Committee of the Judicial Conference of the United States.

== Notable quotes ==
"Law school is not easy. We will require you to work hard. Law practice is not easy. Representing people in their most important affairs is hard work. But, being a lawyer is a unique and rewarding opportunity to help others structure their lives in accordance with the law. It is a high calling."

== Sources ==
- UNT Dallas College of Law

Legal offices
Preceded by Seat established by 104 Stat. 5089	Judge of the United States District Court for the Western District of Texas; 1994–2008	Succeeded by Robert L. Pitman
