= Texas Tech University School of Law =

Public law school in Lubbock, Texas, US

- Parent school: Texas Tech University
- Established: 1967; 59 years ago
- School type: Public law school
- Parent endowment: $1.78 billion (2023) (system-wide)
- Dean: Jack Wade Nowlin
- Location: Lubbock, Texas, United States; 33.578787°N 101.886703°W
- Enrollment: 438 (2023)
- Faculty: 68 (2023)
- USNWR ranking: 82nd (tie) (2024)
- Bar pass rate: 92.14% (2023)
- Website: depts.ttu.edu/law/
- ABA profile: Standard 509 Report

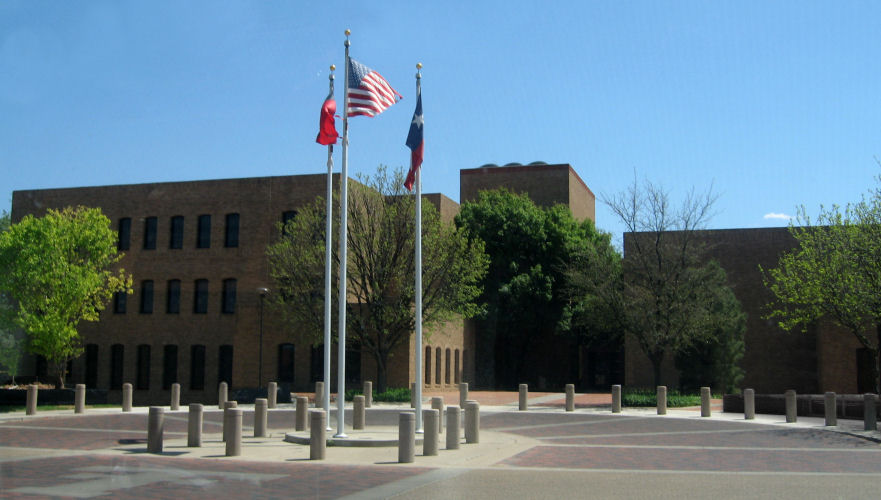
School of Law

The Texas Tech University School of Law is an ABA-accredited law school located on the campus of Texas Tech University in Lubbock, Texas. The school offers three academic centers, ten dual-degree programs, a nationally recognized legal writing program, and a competitive advocacy program that has earned 45 national and international championships. Additionally, third-year law students may participate in one of the school's eight clinical programs, which allow students to gain real-world experience while providing free legal representation to low-income individuals. The school focuses on forming practical lawyers who are ready to practice law upon graduation. The student population is approximately 60.4% male and 39.6% female.

== Academics & Programs ==
Texas Tech School of Law offers a standard Juris Doctor degree program, as well as ten dual-degree programs spanning areas of business, science and engineering, sports management, and government and public administration. Students may pursue academic concentrations in Business Law, Criminal Law and Innocence, and Law and Science. The school is also home to an awarded Advocacy Program and growing Energy Law Program.

The School of Law houses eight clinical programs in which students may participate:

- Capital Punishment Clinic
- Caprock Regional Public Defender Office
- Civil Practice Clinic
- Criminal Defense Clinic
- Family Law and Housing Clinic
- Tax Clinic
- Innocence Clinic
- Advanced Alternative Dispute Resolution Clinic

The School of Law also hosts three academic centers:

- Center for Biodefense, Law, and Public Policy
- Center for Military Law and Policy
- Center for Water Law and Policy

== Bar exam performance ==
In 2000, Texas Tech University School of Law had a 100% bar passage rate for first-time exam takers for the February 2000 Bar Examination. The school's bar passage rate for first-timers taking the July 2025 exam was 95.97%, placing Texas Tech School of Law in the top five law schools in Texas for 2025 bar passage rates.

== Employment ==
According to Texas Tech's 2016 ABA-required disclosures, 85.79% of the class of 2016 obtained full-time, long-term, JD-required employment 10 months after graduation.

== Costs ==
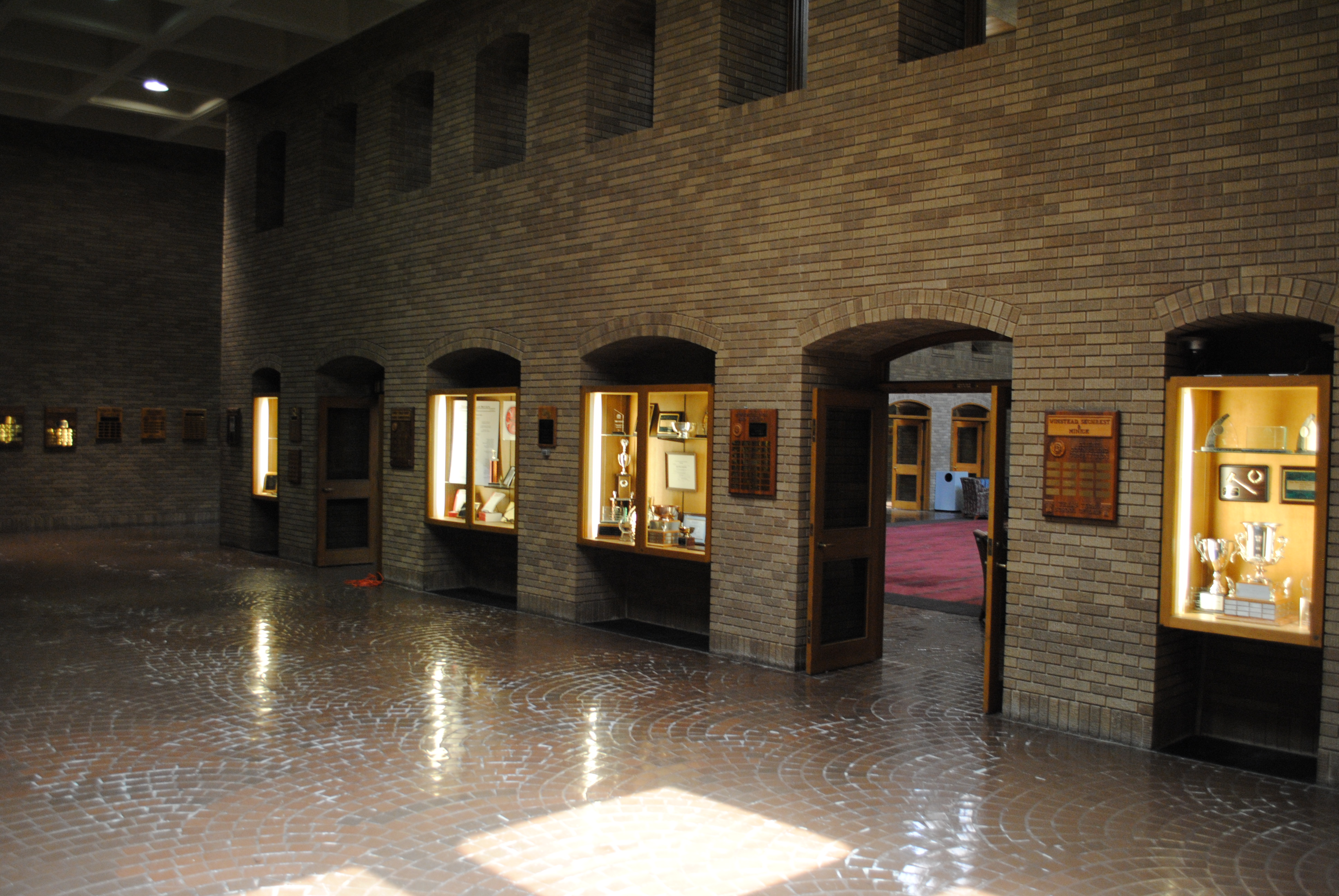
A view inside the law school

The total cost of attendance (indicating the cost of tuition, fees, and living expenses) at Texas Tech for the 2017-2018 academic year is $39,175 for Texas residents and $50,515 for nonresident students. The Law School Transparency estimated 100% debt-financed cost of attendance for three years is $139,550 for Texas residents.

== Notable people ==
=== Alumni ===
- Phil Johnson '75: Sitting member of the Texas Supreme Court and former chief justice of the 7th Court of Appeals.
- Karen Tandy '77: first female head of the Drug Enforcement Administration
- Walter Huffman '77: Judge Advocate General for the United States Army; dean for the law school
- Robert L. Duncan '81, fourth Chancellor of the Texas Tech University System
- Mark Lanier '84, trial lawyer and founder of Lanier law, philanthropist and board member of Texas Tech Law School Foundation. Lanier funded the Mark and Becky Lanier Professional Development Center expansion to the law school's facilities at $6 million.
- Timothy Perrin '87: former president of Lubbock Christian University
- Nathaniel Moran '02: U.S. Representative for Texas’s 1st Congressional District
