= University of North Texas at Dallas College of Law =

Public law school in Dallas, Texas, US

University of North Texas at Dallas College of Law (UNT Dallas College of Law)
- Parent school: University of North Texas at Dallas
- Established: 2014; 12 years ago
- School type: Public
- Dean: A. Felecia Epps
- Location: Dallas, Texas, U.S.
- Enrollment: 375
- USNWR ranking: 159 (tie) (2026)
- Bar pass rate: 72.5% (2026)
- Website: https://lawschool.untdallas.edu/
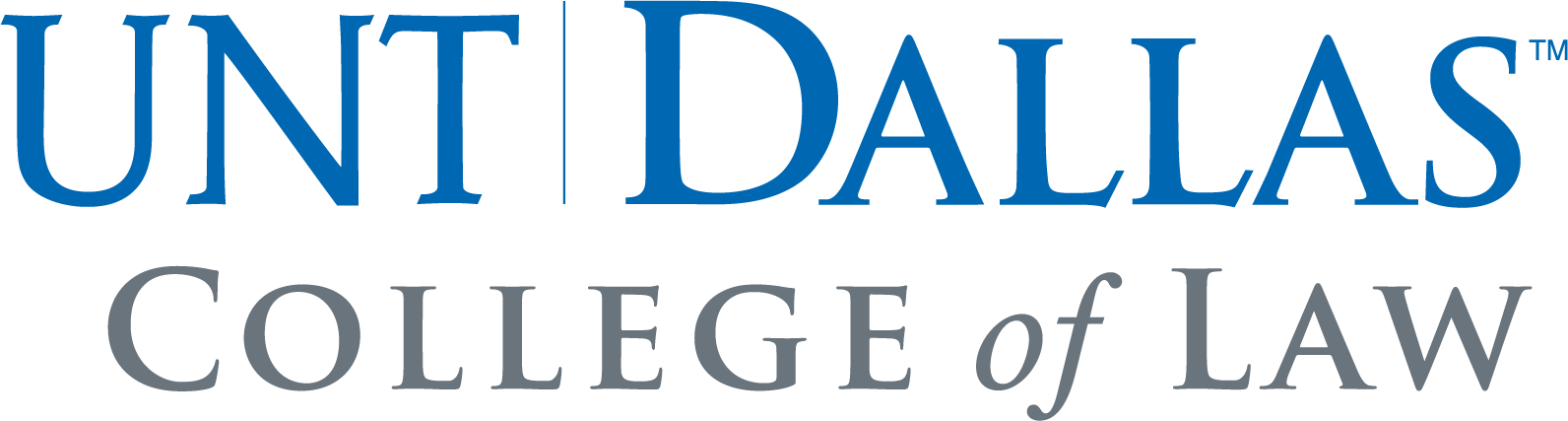

The University of North Texas at Dallas College of Law (UNT Dallas College of Law) is a law school institution accredited by the American Bar Association (ABA). It is located at 106 S. Harwood St. in the UNT Dallas Law Center. The parent institution is University of North Texas at Dallas (UNTD) and is the only public law school in Dallas. The first class entered in the fall of 2014. The school was originally housed in the historic Titche-Goettinger Building in downtown Dallas.

The school has been called "unconventional" in its goal of educating lawyers as public servants. The school places less emphasis on national rankings and LSAT scores in favor of students with life experiences. The school also hired faculty to focus entirely on teaching instead of legal scholarship. The school's low tuition fees have resulted in a lower acceptance rate than the national average.

As of February 2022, UNT Dallas College of Law is fully accredited by the ABA.

== History ==
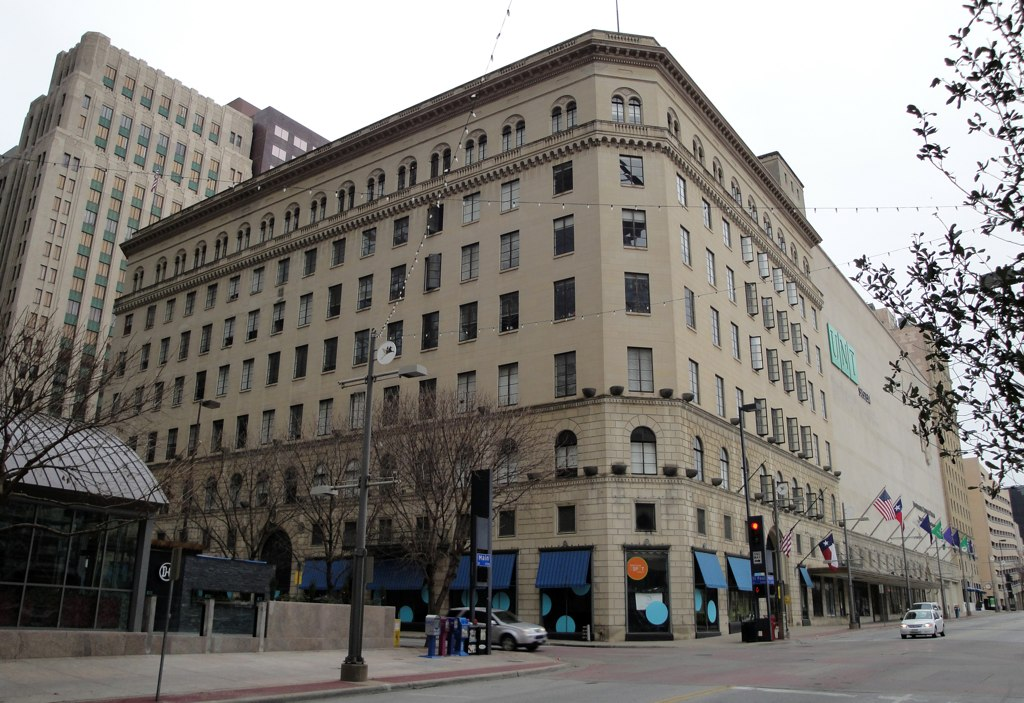
The Titche-Goettinger Building in downtown Dallas served as the initial campus of the University of North Texas at Dallas College of Law.

The University of North Texas at Dallas, the first public university in the city of Dallas, was first created in 2000. The university's law school accepted its first class in 2014. The school was denied accreditation by the American Bar Association in 2016, but received provisional accreditation in 2017. Provisional status allows graduating students to take the bar exam. On February 8, 2022, the school received full approval from the American Bar Association.

The school's founding dean was former federal district judge Royal Furgeson. The school's initial campus was in the UNT System Building, the former Titche-Goettinger Building, at 1901 Main St. and then expanded in 2019 to include the nearby Dallas Municipal Building at 106 South Harwood, which the school purchased for $1. In 2015, the Texas Legislature approved a $56 million bond to pay for a renovation of the school's future campus.

The class entering in 2023 had an average LSAT score of 153 and average GPA of 3.43 for full time students.

== Cost ==
Cost for the 2023-24 academic year was $19,127 for in-state students and $32,008 for out-of-state students. As of 2014, UNTD was the least expensive law school in Texas, and, in 2017, had an acceptance rate of 42.26%.

== Bar passage ==
The first graduating class had a 59.32% passage rate for the 2017 July Bar exam, the lowest in the state. The pass rates increased to 61.18% in July 2018 and 67.61% in July 2019. Due to the COVID-19 pandemic the Bar exam was administered in September 2020 and October 2020, with UNTD pass rates of 62.5% and 74.19% respectively. UNTD had a pass rate of 68.37% in July 2021 and 61.05% in July 2022.

== Notable faculty ==
- Thomas Perkins, Dallas City Attorney (2005–2013)

== Notable alumni ==
- Darryl Morris, NFL cornerback and free agent who signed with the San Francisco 49ers, New York Giants, and Houston Texans.
